= Klon language =

Language in Indonesia

Klon
- Kelon
- Native to: Indonesia
- Region: Alor Island, East Nusa Tenggara
- Native speakers: 5,000 (2008)
- Language family: Trans–New Guinea ?: West Bomberai ?; Timor–Alor–Pantar; Alor–Pantar; Alor; West; Klon

Language codes
- ISO 639-3: kyo
- Glottolog: kelo1247
- ELP: Kelon

Klon, or Kelon, (pronounced: [kəlon]) is a Papuan language of the western tip of Alor Island in the Alor archipelago of East Nusa Tenggara, Indonesia.

== Classification ==
Klon is a member of the Alor–Pantar languages, within the Timor–Alor–Pantar language family. Klon is part of the Alor subgroup along with Abui, Adang, Blagar, Kafoa, Kamang, Kui, Retta, Sawila, and Wersing.

Klon is closely related to the Adang language, spoken across Kalabahi Bay to the north.

== Phonology ==
All the information in this section is from Louise Baird's grammar. Klon has 17 consonant phonemes and 13 vowel phonemes.

=== Consonants ===
		Bilabial	Alveolar	Palatal	Velar	Glottal
Nasal		m	n		ŋ	
Plosive	voiceless	p	t		k	ʔ
Plosive	voiced	b	d	ɟ	g	ʔ
Fricative			s			h
Trill			r			
Approximant			l	j	w	

Aspiration is sometimes produced with voiceless stops. The voiced labio-velar approximant /w/ is infrequently produced as a voiced bilabial fricative [β] by some speakers.

Some of the consonants have a limited distribution. The voiced velar stop /g/ only occurs syllable initially. The voiced velar nasal /ŋ/ only occurs syllable finally. The voiced palatal stop /ɟ/, which only occurs word-finally, in a limited number of words. Some older speakers use the voiced alveolar stop [d] for /ɟ/. The rhotic trill /r/ and the voiceless alveolar fricative /s/ occur both syllable finally and syllable initially. They occur word initially in only a few lexical items each. Some of these lexical items are clearly borrowings. The voiced labio-velar approximant /w/ and the voiced palatal approximant /j/ do not occur syllable-finally.

=== Vowels ===
==== Monophthongs ====
Monophthong phonemes
	Front	Central	Back
Close	i • iː		u • uː
Close-mid	e		o • oː
Open-mid	ɛ • ɛː	ə	ɔ
Open		a • aː	

The mid-front unrounded vowel /e/ and the open mid back rounded vowel /ɔ/ occur infrequently. Schwa only occurs in unstressed syllables.

==== Diphthongs ====
Diphthong phonemes
	Closer component is front	Closer component is back
Opener component is unrounded	aɪ • ɛi	
Opener component is rounded		oɪ • ui

Diphthongs occur in both open and closed syllables.

== Grammar ==
=== Grammatical relations ===
Klon has split-S alignment. The alignment can be considered agentive. In Klon, the only argument of an intransitive clause (S) is sometimes treated the same as an agent-like argument of a transitive clause (S_{A}=A), and sometimes treated the same as a patient-like argument of a transitive clause (S_{O}=O).

Whether S patterns with A or with O depends on the properties of the S argument, as well as the lexical class of the verb. In one class of verbs, S is coded like A, in another class of verbs S is treated as O, and in the third class of verbs, S can align with A or O, depending on the agentive properties of the S argument. The first verb class, the one which invariably aligns S as A, is the largest class. Only the third class of verbs exhibits fluid S alignment.

For the third verb class, when S has characteristics of an Actor, it patterns like A. When it has characteristics of an Undergoer, (more specifically, when S is an affected participant, but not a volitional and controlling participant) it patterns like O.

The argument of an intransitive may be realized in several ways. A full NP can be used alone, a full NP can be used in combination with a pronoun, or only a pronoun can be used. In all cases the free pronoun is only used with S_{A} arguments, and the bound pronoun with S_{O} arguments. Grammatical relations are not morphologically indicated when arguments are full NPs. Klon has multiple pronominal paradigms. Free pronouns mark A and S_{A} arguments, while bound pronouns indicate O and S_{O} arguments.

In example 1 below, the A argument is indicated by the free pronoun ini, while the O argument instead has the bound pronoun g-.

Koh ini awa g- eh nang.
finish 3NSG again 3UND_{1}- feed NEG
After (that was finished) they didn't feed her any more.

In example 2, the S_{O} argument is indicated with the bound pronoun n-, and the A argument is represented by the free pronoun na.

Uruut béq ma, n- edan, na ete hil agai.
deer pig come 1SG.UND_{1}- scared 1SG.ACT tree climb go
Deer and pig came, I was scared, I climbed a tree.

In example 3, S_{A} is indicated by the free pronoun ini.

Nang, ini hok waa nang.
NEG 3NSG IRR go NEG
No, they didn't go.

Anaphoric co-reference

When co-referring A and S_{A} arguments occur in paratactically conjoined clauses, the argument in the second clause can be either reduced to a pronoun or deleted.

A ne- uur, koh bo ∅ u- agar.
2SG.ACT 1SG.UND_{4}- see finish SEQ ∅ VI- laugh
A O V {} {} ∅ {} V
You saw me then (you) laughed.

Similarly, co-referring O and S_{O} arguments which occur in paratactically conjoined clauses allow reduction or deletion of the argument in the second clause.

Joni Peter gin= tendang, koh ho Louise awa gin= kob.
Joni Peter 3UND_{3}= kick finish SIM Louise again 3UND_{3}= hit
A O O V {} {} A {} O V
Joni kicked Peter then Louise hit him (Peter) again.

Word order

The word order of intransitives is SV.

Transitive clauses can have AOV, OAV, or AVO word order. AOV word order disambiguates the A and O arguments when their animacy is equivalent and which argument is which is not otherwise inferrable from context.

=== Voice ===
Papuan languages generally lack active-passive voice distinctions. Due to the absence of mention of this topic in Baird's grammar, it is assumed that Klon is a typical Papuan language in this regard.

=== Valence ===
Most verbs can occur in intransitive and transitive constructions. Klon speakers seldom use ditransitive clauses. Only the verb en 'to give' is always ditransitive (trivalent). In en constructions, the Primary Undergoer, the recipient, is indicated by a pronominal prefix on the verb; the Secondary Undergoer, the theme, occurs as a full NP.

Bapak ak n- en na kde.
father part 1SG.UND_{1}- give 1SG.ACT eat
Dad give me some to eat (lit. I eat).

Valency-decreasing operations

The reciprocal marker t-/to-/tin-/te- indicates that the Actor and Undergoer within a clause are the same referent. Thus, it makes a divalent verb monovalent. The reciprocal marker can only occur with non-singular Actors.

Gi- man ong kantor mi kreyang,
3.POSS_{2}- father this office be.at work
The father worked in an office,

ini t- riyang t- muinpuin ma, ho g- ooi i ebeer.
3NSG RECP- take.care.of RECP- care.for come SIM 3.POSS_{1}- mother DUR die
they took care of each other, until their mother died.

Noun incorporation also decreases valency in Klon.

Valency-increasing operations

The verbal prefix u- increases valency by adding an Undergoer argument. The possible role of the Undergoer includes those of Patient, Theme, Recipient, or Goal.

In the following example, ebeer 'die' has a single Undergoer NP argument doqom 'grandfather'.

Karel aan di ma, de bo na o- tuub abang Karel ong di ge dat, aan qada hok yeh nang, bo i- doqom ebeer.
Karel 2SG.ACT also come CONJ SEQ 1SG.ACT 2SG.UND_{2}- show say Karel this also 3.POSS_{F} grandchild 2SG.ACT IPFV IRR CONT NEG SEQ 2SG.POSS_{2}- grandfather die
Karel you also come so that I show you saying Karel here is also his grandchild, you didn't exist yet when your grandfather died

In the next example, the Undergoer argument associated with the verb ebeer 'die' is indicated by a third person pronoun verbal prefix, as well as with a full NP Labgei ong 'this Labgei'.

Wed usong unu her, nok de, na wo o- tmein, de mde, de uiliik, de Labgei ong pi g- ebeer.
now seven market descend good CONJ 1SG.ACT that 2SG.UND_{2}- order CONJ ascend CONJ sell CONJ Labgei this 1NSG.INCL.ACT 3UND_{1}- die
Next week descend to the market and I'll order you to go up and sell so that we can kill this Labegai.

Example 3 is similar to example 2, except now only the pronominal prefix is used to indicate the Undergoer.

Nuk mde g- ebeer g- ebeer go- agai man leer g- en.
one ascend 3UND_{1}- die 3UND_{1}- die 3UND_{2}- go Mr ruler 3UND_{1}- give
One ascended killing them and killing them bringing them and giving them to the ruler.

Example 4 is in reference to a story about a grandfather beating his grandchildren if they did not get out of bed early in the morning. The speaker uses the inanimate Undergoer argument haib 'danger', as the reason for dying. Hok 'some', refers to the people who die. The u- prefix is used so that ebeer can take the additional argument haib.

Ho wed a ini gin= tolong ongo hok haib u- ebeer u- ihin =e nang?
SIM now 2SG.ACT 3NSG 3UND_{3}= help this some danger VI- die VI- lost =FOC NEG
So now you help them like this, do any die from danger or not?

The applicative verbal prefix mi- allows an added Undergoer argument as well, but this Undergoer can only be an Instrument.

Na lam.
1SG.ACT walk
I'm walking.

Na doob mi- lam.
1SG.ACT stick APPL- walk
I use a stick to walk.

These two valency-increasing prefixes cannot co-occur on the same verb.

== Writing system ==
The consonant phonemes are written as follows:

- /ʔ/ q
- /ɟ/ j
- /ŋ/ ng
- /j/ y

All other consonants use the same graphemes as IPA.

The short vowel phonemes are written as follows:

- /i/ i
- /e/ é
- /ɛ/ e
- /ə/ ∅ (not written)
- /o/ o
- /ɔ/ ò
- /a/ a

The long vowels are written as double graphemes such as "ee" for /ɛː/.
