= Abui language =

Alor language spoken in Indonesia

Abui
- Abui tanga
- Region: Alor Island
- Ethnicity: Abui
- Native speakers: (16,000? cited 1981)
- Language family: Trans–New Guinea ?: West Bomberai ?; Timor–Alor–Pantar; Alor–Pantar; Alor; Abui
- Writing system: Latin

Language codes
- ISO 639-3: abz
- Glottolog: abui1241
- ELP: Abui

Abui is a non-Austronesian language of the Alor Archipelago. It is spoken in the central part of Alor Island in Eastern Indonesia, East Nusa Tenggara (NTT) province by the Abui people. The native name in the Takalelang dialect is Abui tanga which literally translates as 'mountain language'.

== Classification ==
Abui is a member of the Alor–Pantar languages, within the Timor–Alor–Pantar language family. Based on shared phonological consonant innovations, Abui is part of the Alor subgroup along with Blagar, Adang, Klon, Kui, Kamang, Sawila, and Wersing. Contrary to earlier claims, there is still no conclusive evidence linking the Timor-Alor-Pantar languages to the Trans-New-Guinea family.

== History ==
The Alor-Pantar languages are, at the most, ~3,000 years old.

It appears as though Proto-AP speakers borrowed certain Austronesian words prior to the breakup of Proto-AP; these loan words underwent regular sound change and can therefore be reconstructed for Proto-AP.

== Geographic distribution ==
Abui is spoken by approximately 16,000 speakers in the central part of the Alor Island in Eastern Indonesia, East Nusa Tenggara (NTT) province.

=== Internal variation ===
Abui has a number of dialects: Northern, Southern and Western. Northern dialects spoken around villages of Mainang, Masape, Takalelang and Atimelang have been subject of linguistic study. Southern dialects are spoken around Kelaisi and Apui; western dialects are spoken around Mataru, Fanating and Moru. These dialects remain unstudied.

== Phonology ==
Abui has a relatively simple phonemic inventory with 16 native and 3 loan consonants. There are 5 short vowels each of them having a long counterpart. In a number of cases lexical tone is found. All information in this section is from Kratochvíl 2007.

=== Consonants ===
		Bilabial	Alveolar	Palatal	Velar	Glottal
Nasal		m	n		ŋ	
Plosive/ Affricate	voiceless	p	t	(cç)	k	ʔ
Plosive/ Affricate	voiced	b	d	(ɟʝ)	(g)	
Fricative		f	s			h
Approximant			l	j	w	
Trill			r			

The consonants /cç/, /ɟʝ/, and /g/ are non-native, having been borrowed from Malay in recent decades. As indicated by the chart above, Abui has /r/ and /l/ as separate phonemes.

=== Vowels ===
==== Monophthongs ====
Monophthongs
	Short		Long	
	Front	Back	Front	Back
Close	ɪ	u	iː	uː
Mid	ɛ	ɔ	eː	oː
Open	ɑ		aː	

==== Diphthongs ====
Diphthongs
	Ending with /ɪ/	Ending with /ɑ/	Ending with /ɛ/	Ending with /ɔ/
Starting with /u/	uɪ	uɑ		uɔ
Starting with /ɪ/		ɪɑ	ɪɛ	ɪɔ
Starting with /ɑ/	ɑɪ			
Starting with /ɛ/	ɛɪ	ɛɑ		
Starting with /ɔ/	ɔɪ			

== Grammar ==
Abui is a head-marking language; pronominal prefixes mark the possessors on nouns and undergoer arguments on verbs. Nominal morphology is restricted to possessor inflection; number, case and gender inflections do not appear. Verbal morphology is elaborate including person and aspect inflection. Verb compounding and serialization are common.

=== Lexical categories ===
All information in this section is from Kratochvíl 2007.

Open classes in Abui are nouns and verbs. Closed classes are adjectives, deictics, quantifiers, aspectual markers, linkers, adverbs, and question words.

Of these word classes, only verbs and nouns can combine with pronominal prefixes. Only verbs take one of the set of pronominal prefixes (type II REC), and only verbs combine with aspectual suffixes. Some stems can serve as both nouns and verbs, like tur 'spoon/scoop' below.

tur as a noun:

ah, na sei tur mi=se yo!
oh 1SG come.down.CNT spoon take=INCPI MDAD
'ah, I'm about to come down to pick up the spoon!'

tur as a verb:

fat ma tur ba di takei=se!
corn ripe spoon.up.CPL LNK 3A bite=INCPI
'dish up cooked corn so that he eats!'

Unlike other verbs, stative verbs do not require the intersective linker ba when they modify a noun.

Abui has a small class of adjectives. Adjectives can modify NPs but they can not head a VP. Stative verbs, on the other hand, can both modify NPs and serve as predicates. In order for an adjectival stem to be used predicatively, the addition of the generic verb -i is required. Compare the adjective akan 'black', with the stative verb fing 'be eldest', below.

akan as NP modifier:

kaai akan kaliet-a
dog black old-be.at
'the black dog is old'

akan-i as predicate:

kaai akan-i
dog black-put
'the dog is black' (not good for 'black dog')

fing as NP modifier:

moku fing do
kid be.eldest PRX
'this oldest child'

fing as predicate:

do-fing
3I.REC-be.eldest
'he is eldest'

=== Morphology ===
Abui is agglutinating and polysynthetic. Nouns are usually morphologically simple, while verbs can have affixes indicating person and aspect. Verb roots also combine with each other. Some words are monomorphemic, consisting of one free root, such as nee 'eat.' Others are more morphologically complex:

prefix-bound.root-bound.root-suffix
ha-bek-d-i
'got it broken'

prefix-free.root-bound.root-suffix
ha-bui-d-a
'get it shortened'

=== Possession ===
Abui has possessor-possessum word order. Different classes of prefixes on the possessum designate alienable and inalienable possession. Inalienably-possessed items consist of most body part terms, two kinship terms, and the words ne 'name' and mol 'enemy'. Alienably-possessed items consist of almost all common nouns, parts of wholes, and most kin terms.

ha- as pronominal prefix marking inalienable possessive:

ha-bikil
3II.INAL-navel
'his/her navel'

he- as pronominal prefix marking alienable possessive:

he-konrek
3II.AL-shirt
'his/her shirt'

The same series of prefixes on the possessum are used when possessors are expressed as nouns.

he- as prefix marking alienable possessive:

maama he-konrek
father 3II.AL-shirt
'father's shirt'

=== Morphosyntactic alignment ===
Abui has a semantic alignment driven by the semantic features of the participants. A language with such a 'fluid alignment' is often referred to as an active–stative language. In semantic alignment, instigating, controlling and volitional participants are realized as the A argument in both transitive and intransitive construction. In Abui, they are expressed with NPs and free pronouns. The affected participants are realized as the U argument. U arguments are expressed by NPs and pronominal prefixes on the verb. There are three types of pronominal prefixes distinguishing the following types of U arguments: patients (PAT), recipients or goals (REC), and benefactives or locations (LOC).

=== Noun phrase structure ===
Abui syntax is characterized by strict constituent order. In an NP, the modifiers follow the head noun with the exception of deictic demonstratives and possessors. The NP template is given in below:

NP template: DEM_{s}/NMC_{s} (POSS-) N N/ADJ/V/QUANT ba + NMC DEM_{a}

The deictic demonstrative indicates the spatial location of the referent and together with the possessor marking precede the head (N). Adjectives (A), stative verbs (V) and quantifiers (QUANT) follow the head. The final constituent of an NP is usually an anaphoric demonstrative (DEM_{a}) that indicates the 'discourse location' of the referent. Noun-modifying clauses (NMC) normally occur following the head linked with ba. However, a NMC elaborating on the location of the referent (NMC_{s}) occurs in the same position as the deictic demonstrative, preceding the head noun.

=== Clause structure ===
In a clause, the arguments always precede the predicate. The constituent order is strict; the clause template is given below.

Clause template: ADV NP PRO_{A} ADV/DEM_{s} NP_{U} VP NEG DEM_{t}

Note that the deictic demonstrative (DEM_{s}) indicating the spatial location of the event always precedes the predicate. The demonstrative (DEM_{t}) indicating the temporal location of an event is the final clause constituent. The constituent order in the clause is pragmatically motivated, and the prominent arguments that occur in the preceding discourse are omitted. The topical arguments can be left-dislocated. In a sentence, the main clause (MC) may contain marking of tense, aspect and mood. In subordinate clauses (SC), the marking of tense, aspect and mood is reduced and shared with the MC. The position of a SC with respect to the MC is determined by its semantic type. SCs specifying the temporal location or other settings of the event expressed in the MC must precede the MC. SCs expressing non-factive complements or purpose follow the MC. In discourse, there is a preference for clause chains, with the final fully inflected MC. In narratives, strategies such as tail-head linkage are relied on. More details can be found in Kratochvíl (2007).

=== Voice ===
Abui, like most Papuan languages, lacks an active-passive voice distinction.

=== Valence ===
Most verbs can occur in transitive or intransitive constructions. Abui has no ditransitive verbs.

== Writing system ==
Abui orthography is based on Indonesian. Long vowels are spelled as double vowels. High tone is marked with an acute accent on the vowel, and low tone is marked with a grave one.

== Example ==
Excerpt from moku mayol, a bride price negotiation text

moku mayol, he-ni-l yal he-fu
kid woman 3II.LOC-be.like.this.CPL-give now 3II.AL-betel.nut
'the daughter, it became so, now her betel nut'

he-meting siei he-ya he-maama
3II.AL-betel.vine come.down.ICP 3II.AL-mother 3II.AL-father
'and her betel vine was brought down, her mother and father'

moku mayol po-tafuda he-kang he-fanga
kid woman 1PL.I.REC-be.all 3II.LOC-be.good 3II.LOC-say.CNT
'the daughter, all of us agreed'

ma hare, neng he-fing he-kalieta naha=te
be.PRX so man 3II.LOC-oldest 3II.AL-old.person or
'being so, the parents and elder of the man, or'

he-ya he-maama+ ko pi yaa mit nate-a tanga
3II.AL-mother 3II.AL-father soon 1PL.I go sit stand.up-DUR speak
'his mother and father, we shall negotiate'

ananra he-lung ha-liel lung pe-i mit-i mangkaisara
tell.CNT 3II.AL-door 3II.PAT-lift door near-PFV sit-PFV macassarese.drum
'to open the door, for (those who) sit near the door, one makassarese (drum)'

nuku mayol he-bel yawa lohu ayoku mangkaisara nuku
one woman 3II.LOC-buy javanese.drum be.long two macassarese.drum one
'the bride price two long Javanese drums, one Macassarese drum'

ma hare neng he-ya naha=te he-maama
be.PRX so man 3II.AL-mother or 3II.AL-father
'being so, the mother of the man, or his father'

he-fing he-kalieta pi sama tanga sama ananra
3II.LOC-oldest 3II.AL-old.person 1PL.I be.with speak.CNT be.with tell.CNT
'(those) elder (to him), his grandparents, we negotiate together'

he-war he-tadeng mi ba awering ha-tàng
3II.AL-sun 3II.AL-day be.in LNK ladder 3II.PAT-release
'the day when the young woman will be delivered to her husband', lit. when the ladder will be released

== Linguistic situation ==
=== Documentation ===
The Abui ethnic group has attracted the attention of foreign researchers since the 1930s. American cultural anthropologist Cora Du Bois lived between 1937 and 1939 in the village of Atimelang. Her research is documented in her monograph 'The People of Alor'. Cora Du Bois was accompanied by the Dutch sociologist Martha Margaretha Nicolspeyer who conducted a study of the social structure of Abui people.

After World War II, W.A.L. Stokhof and H. Steinhauer conducted a linguistic survey of Alor and Pantar. Later, W.A.L. Stokhof published and analyzed one of the texts collected by Nicolspeyer. Linguistic documentation efforts have been undertaken recently by Leiden University. As one of the results of the Alor and Pantar Project, a description of Abui grammar appeared in 2007. More recently a tri-lingual Abui-Indonesian-English dictionary was published in Indonesia. The dictionary was accompanied by a tri-lingual collection of stories from Takalelang and Tifolafeng.

=== Endangerment and revitalization ===
Due to language shift among the young generation, Abui is considered "threatened" and it is being taught as a subject in local schools.
