= Tereweng language =

Language of Indonesia

Tereweng
- Native to: Indonesia
- Region: Tereweng Island
- Ethnicity: Tereweng
- Native speakers: 1,100
- Language family: Trans–New Guinea ?: West Bomberai ?; Timor–Alor–Pantar; Alor–Pantar; Alor; West; Straits; Blagaric; Tereweng

Language codes
- ISO 639-3: twg
- Glottolog: tere1277
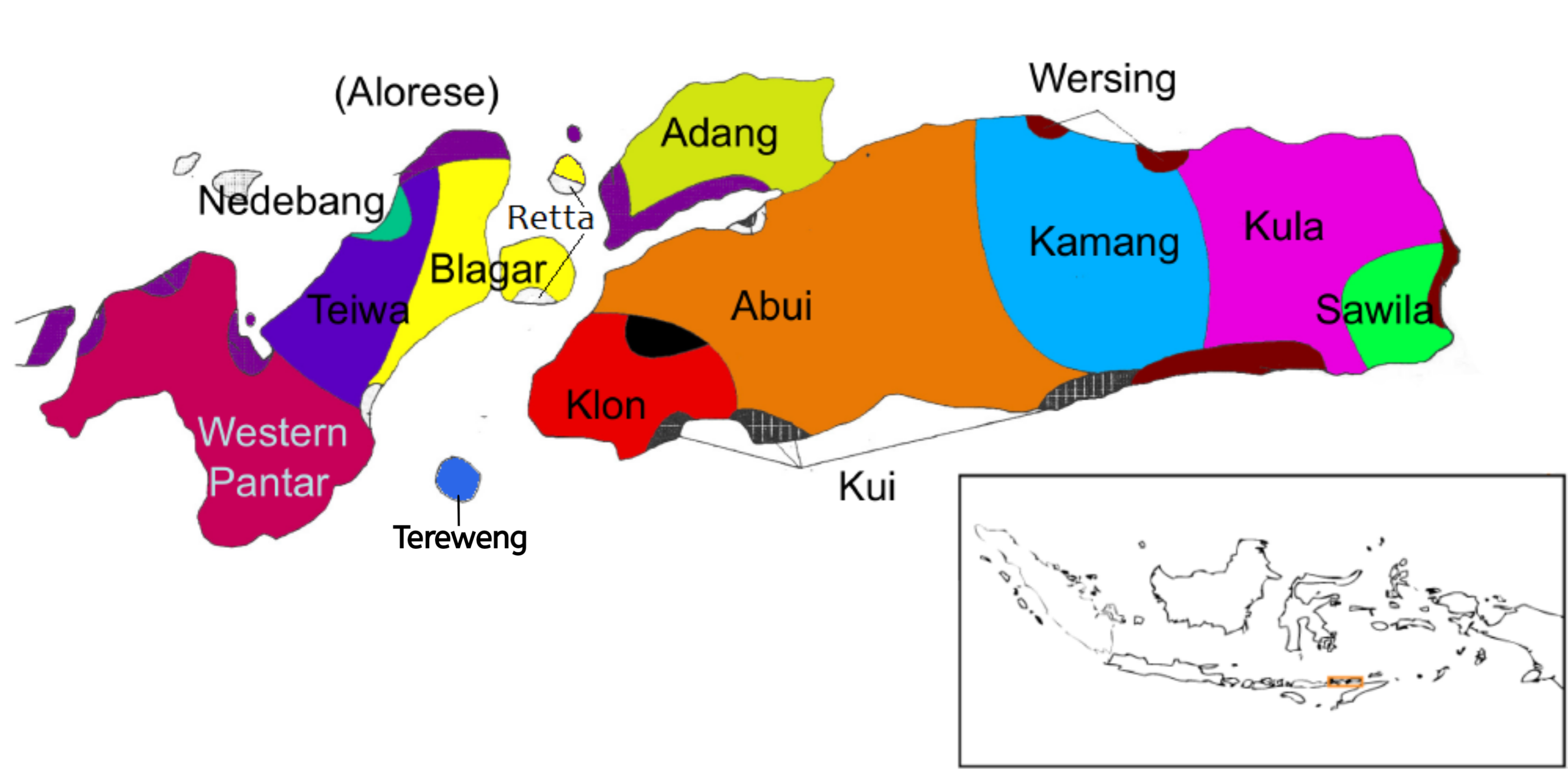
- Languages of the Alor Archipelago; Tereweng is shown in separate blue in the southern part.

Tereweng is an Alor–Pantar language spoken by the Tereweng people on Tereweng Island, southeast of Pantar. This language is especially closely related to Blagar, sometimes considered a dialect of it, or more distantly to Retta.

The speakers number around 1,100, most of whom are multilingual, able to speak Alor Malay and Indonesian. Its speakers are mostly Muslims, especially closely related to the Blagar people.
