= Nedebang language =

Language in Indonesia

Nedebang
- Klamu
- Native to: Indonesia
- Region: Pantar Island
- Native speakers: 200 (2004)
- Language family: Trans–New Guinea ?: West Bomberai ?; Timor–Alor–Pantar; Alor–Pantar; Nedebang

Language codes
- ISO 639-3: nec
- Glottolog: nede1245
- ELP: Nedebang

Nedebang is a Papuan language spoken in the villages of Balungada and Baulang in the eastern district of Pantar Island in the Alor Archipelago of Indonesia. There are also Nedebang speakers in Air Panas, administratively part of Balungada but located 1 km from the main village.

Nedebang is an extremely endangered language. It is no longer used as the language of daily communication, even within the home. Indonesian and Alor Malay is used widely. Some residents of Bolungada are also fluent in Teiwa language; and some residents of Air Panas speak the Baranusa dialect of the Alorese language (not to be confused with Alor Malay). Fieldwork in 2004 estimates that there are fewer than 200 speakers of Nedebang and the youngest speakers are in their 50s.

== Name ==
The name Nedebang is widely recognized by speakers, though some prefer the name Klamu. The former refers to an ancestral village located on a ridge above the area in which the speakers now reside. This area is reportedly still used for gardening and for traditional ceremonies. The term Klamu refers to a tribe (Indonesian suku). The Klamu people moved from Nedebang to the coast prior to Indonesian independence, probably in the 1930s. Religion plays a significant role in the social and linguistic dynamics of the region. With the exception of Air Panas, the people of Balungada are Christian, and most residents are of Klamu descent. In contrast, the villages of Baulang and Air Panas are Islamic and contain significant populations of Austronesian-speakers who have migrated from Baranusa. The language thus appears to be more viable in Balungada. There appears to be no strong dialect division within Nedebang.
