= Kafoa language =

Language in Indonesia

Kafoa
- Jafoo, Habollat
- Native to: Indonesia
- Region: Alor Island, East Nusa Tenggara
- Ethnicity: Kafoa
- Native speakers: 1,000 (2013)
- Language family: Trans–New Guinea ?: West Bomberai ?; Timor–Alor–Pantar; Alor–Pantar; Alor ?; Kafoa

Language codes
- ISO 639-3: kpu
- Glottolog: kafo1240

Kafoa, also known as Jafoo or Habollat, is a Papuan language of Alor Island in the Alor archipelago of Indonesia. Although Kafoa speakers refer to both themselves and their language with the name "Kafoa", this word is not well known in the area. Kafoa speakers are frequently multilingual, also speaking Alor Malay, Klon, and Abui, also Indonesian as the national language. Children are typically initially taught Alor Malay by their parents and later acquire Kafoa after having reached school age.

== Classification ==
Glottolog classifies the Kafoa language within the Nuclear Alor-Pantar subgroup of the Timor-Alor-Pantar language.

== Phonology ==
The data in this section are taken from Baird (2017).

=== Consonants ===
Consonant phonemes
		Bilabial	Alveolar	Palatal	Velar	Glottal
Nasal		m	n		ŋ ⟨ng⟩	
Plosive	voiceless	p	t		k	
Plosive	voiced	b	d		ɡ	
Fricative		f	s			h
Semivowel		w		j ⟨y⟩		
Liquid	lateral		l			
Liquid	rhotic		r			

=== Vowels ===
Vowel phonemes
	Front		Central		Back	
High	i	iː			u	uː
				ʊ	ʊː	
						o
Mid						
	ɛ	ɛː				ɔː
Low			a	aː		
