= Retta language =

Alor–Pantar language spoken in Indonesia

Retta
- Reta
- Native to: Indonesia
- Region: Alor Archipelago
- Native speakers: (undated figure of 2000-3000)
- Language family: Trans–New Guinea ?: West Bomberai ?; Timor–Alor–Pantar; Alor–Pantar; Pantar–Straits; Straits; Blagaric; Retta

Language codes
- ISO 639-3: ret
- Glottolog: rett1240
- Coordinates: 8°18′15″S 124°20′31″E

Retta (also called Reta) is a Papuan language spoken on Pura and Ternate islands, located between Pantar and Alor in the Alor archipelago of Indonesia. It is spoken by a few thousand people, and is considered an endangered language by Ethnologue.

It is not related to but not mutually intelligible with Blagar, which is spoken on the north side of Pura Island, and is unrelated to the Austronesian language Alorese, which is spoken on the north side of Ternate. One of its most distinctive features is a morphophonological process where some words can be intensified or made vulgar by replacing an /l/ sound with an [r] sound.

== Classification ==
Retta is a member of the Timor–Alor–Pantar languages, a group of approximately 30 languages at the western edge of the Papuan languages (the non-Austronesian languages of New Guinea and surrounding islands). It is part of the Alor–Pantar branch within the TAP languages. Bayesian analysis suggests that Retta is most closely related to the Blagar language, followed by the Pura language. These three languages, called the "Straits languages", form a group apart from the Pantar languages.

== Geographic distribution ==
Retta is spoken in the Lesser Sunda Islands of Indonesia. It is primarily spoken on two small islands, Pura and Ternate (Note: not to be confused with its more famous namesake, Ternate in the Maluku Islands), plus two recent settlements on the coast of the larger island of Alor, facing toward Pura and Ternate.

The language's namesake village, Retta, is on the southern coast of Pura. Pura is a small island (28 square kilometres (11 mi^{2})) but it is home to both the Reta and Blagar languages, which are related but not mutually intelligible. Inaccessibility and hostility between the villages on Pura allowed the two languages to coexist in close proximity. In modern times, cross-village communication has increased, but has been generally done in the local lingua francas: Bahasa Indonesia and Malay.

Three villages on Ternate speak Retta, as they were established by Retta-speakers from Pura in the early 20th century, possibly due to religious conflict. Ternate is smaller than Pura, but like Pura, it is multilingual. On the north shore of Ternate, villagers speak Alorese, an unrelated Austronesian language.

== Phonology ==
=== Consonants ===
Retta has 16 consonants, which is a larger consonant inventory than most Alor–Pantar languages:

Consonant phonemes
	Bilabial		Alveolar		Velar		Glottal
Plosive	p	b	t	d	k	ɡ	ʔ
Implosive		ɓ					
Affricate		bv		ʤ			
Fricative			s				h
Nasal		m		n			
Trill				r			
Lateral approximant				l			

The palatal approximant [j] also occurs in Retta (and Blagar) but is analyzed as an allophone of the vowel /i/ rather than a separate phoneme. /s/ occurs mostly in loanwords or other non-native words.

=== Vowels ===
Retta has eight single vowels (monophthongs), which differ in length, height, and backness. Three are always long vowels (eː oː aː), two are always short vowels (ɛ ɔ), and the remaining three are short in most contexts but can be made long via phonological processes.

Vowels
	Front	Central	Back
	unrounded		rounded
Close	i		u
Close-mid	eː		oː
Open-mid	ɛ		ɔ
Open		aː ɑ	

Retta has both diphthongs (two vowels within a single syllable) and vowel sequences (two adjacent vowels in separate syllables). All attested diphthongs move from low-to-high or back-to-front, and the high vowels /i/ and /u/ may manifest as the glides [j] and [w] in diphthongs.

=== Phonological processes ===
Like many other languages, Retta features nasal place assimilation, in which a nasal's place of articulation (optionally) moves to the place of a neighboring consonant. It does not require consonants at the start of a word, but if there is no word-initial consonant, the initial vowel is pre-aspirated. For instance, 'fruit' is underlyingly /aːhi/ but is pronounced as [ʰaːhi]. This pre-aspiration is distinct from a word-initial voiceless glottal fricative [h]; [ʰaːhi] 'fruit' forms a minimal pair with [haːhi] 'rough'.

== Morphology ==
=== Sound-symbolic contrast ===
Retta has a unique non-productive morphophonological process. In approximately 30 words, replacing an /l/ sound with an /r/ sound changes the meaning of the word, increasing its "vulgarity, severity, force of action, or size". Examples include:

L-to-R intensification in Retta
L gloss	L form	R form	R gloss
pull	bili	biri	pull hard, yank
not good	ɓɛlɑ	ɓɛrɑ	bad, terrible
break it	gɑlɑbvɑk	gɑrɑbvɑk	destroy it
penis	-oːl	-oːr	penis (vulgar)

=== Numbers ===
Retta's number words are somewhat complex. The numerals one through six are monomorphemic, meaning that they cannot be broken down into intelligible parts. Seven, eight, and nine are multimorphemic, consisting of multiple components (morphemes). This is similar to English numbers like "twenty-one"; however, the Retta numerals are formed by subtraction rather than addition. Eight, for instance, literally translates as "ten minus two". (Note: The numerals are further complicated by borrowings and language change; seven literally translates as "seven minus three" rather than "ten minus three". See Willemsen (2020) for full details.)

=== Reduplication ===
A common morphological process in Retta is reduplication. Both partial and full reduplication is observed in Retta. Reduplication has a variety of meanings depending on the word being reduplicated, and reduplication can occur on nouns, verbs, interrogatives, and numbers.

== Syntax ==
Retta sentences are generally verb-final, with Subject–object–verb word order if not otherwise morphologically marked.

== Revitalization ==
Retta is considered endangered, and is used primarily by older generations. The Indonesian government has piloted language revitalization programs include writing and teaching Retta songs. However, as of 2020, using Reta (or any other local languages) was not allowed in local schools.
