= West Trans–New Guinea languages =

Proposed language family

West Trans–New Guinea
- (proposed)
- Geographic distribution: Indonesia (Highlands of Western New Guinea); East Timor (in and around Timor)
- Linguistic classification: Trans–New Guinea: West Trans–New Guinea
- Subdivisions: West Timor – Alor–Pantar ?; East Timor – West Bomberai ?; Irian Highlands ?

Language codes
- Glottolog: None
- Map: The West Trans–New Guinea languages of New Guinea The West Trans–New Guinea languages Other Trans–New Guinea languages Other Papuan languages Austronesian languages Uninhabited

The West Trans–New Guinea languages are a suggested linguistic linkage of Papuan languages, not well established as a group, proposed by Malcolm Ross in his 2005 classification of the Trans–New Guinea languages. Ross suspects they are an old dialect continuum, because they share numerous features that have not been traced to a single ancestor using comparative historical linguistics. The internal divisions of the languages are also unclear. William A. Foley considers the TNG identity of the Irian Highlands languages at least to be established.

== Classification ==
The West Trans–New Guinea languages are a group of small families and isolates within Trans–New Guinea which are only tentatively connected. The Irian Highlands families (Dani and Paniai Lakes) appear to belong together, and the Timor and West Bomberai languages share two probable innovations in their pronouns, compared to the rest of TNG.

The following classification is from Ross (2005), Schapper et al. (2012), and Holton et al. (2012).

- West Trans–New Guinea linkage.
  - Irian Highlands?
    - Dani family
    - Paniai Lakes (Wissel Lakes) family
  - West Bomberai – Timor–Alor–Pantar?
    - West Bomberai family
    - Oirata–Makasai family
    - Bunak
    - Alor–Pantar family
    - Teiwa
    - Nedebang
    - Kaera
    - Western Pantar (Lamma)

Bunak and the Alor–Pantar languages are sometimes grouped together as "West Timor".

Pronouns are:

	sg	pl
1	*na	*ni
2	*ka	*ki

reflecting pTNG *na, *ni, *ga, *gi. The pTNG dual/inclusive *-pi- may be reflected in East Timor 1excl *ini, 1incl *api, in West Timor *ni, *pi, and reversed in West Bomberai *bi, *in, but are not attested from the Irian Highlands. The *k of the second person is only found on the mainland; in TAP the forms are *a and *i.

== History of the proposal ==
Despite their geographic proximity, the Papuan languages of Timor are not closely related, and demonstration of a relationship between any of them is difficult, apart from the clearly related Alor–Pantar languages on the islands neighboring Timor.

Arthur Capell first proposed that the Timor languages were a family in 1941, and Watuseke & Anceaux did the same for Timor–Alor–Pantar in 1973. Both units have been broken up in more recent classifications, though their ultimate relationship is generally accepted.

In 1957 HKL Cowan linked the Timor languages to the West Papuan family. However, when Stephen Wurm expanded Trans–New Guinea in 1975, he decided Timor–Alor–Pantar belonged there, and he linked it to the South Bird's Head languages in a South Bird's Head – Timor–Alor–Pantar branch of that phylum. Wurm noted similarities with West Papuan, a different family, but suggested this was due to substratum influence.

Of the Irian Highlands families, Capell linked the Dani languages to Kwerba in 1962. Wurm added Dani-Kwerba, the Wissel Lakes (Paniai Lakes) languages, and South Bomberai to TNG as separate branches of that family. Ross (2005) suggests a possible link between Dani and Paniai with his West TNG proposal, but excludes South Bird's Head as a separate branch of TNG, and Kwerba as belonging to a different family altogether. He did not note any connections to West Papuan.

== Vocabulary comparison ==
The following table includes Dani and Ekagi basic vocabulary from William A. Foley (1986).

The words cited constitute translation equivalents, whether they are cognate (e.g. na-, nai- for “eat”) or not (e.g. mo, tani for “sun”).

gloss	Dani	Ekagi
‘two’	bite	wiya
‘man’	ap	yame
‘water’	i	uwo
‘fire’	idu	bodiya
‘tree’	e	piya
‘leaf’	ega	iye
‘root’	omagen	mani
‘house’	o	owaa
‘breast’	eɗak	ama
‘tooth’	aik	ego
‘bone’	-oak	mitoo
‘ear’	-atuk	gapa
‘hair’	-eti	iyo
‘leg’	-esok	bo
‘blood’	mep	emo
‘hand’	-egi	gane
‘egg’	tewe-gen	napo
‘sun’	mo	tani
‘axe’	posiye	
‘netbag’	su	agiya
‘eat’	na-	nai-
‘die’	kagi-	bokai-
‘say’	i-	tii-
‘give’	et-	mai-
‘big’	gok	ebo
