= Teiwa language =

Language spoken in Indonesia

Teiwa
- Native to: Indonesia
- Region: Pantar Island
- Native speakers: 4,000 (2010)
- Language family: Trans–New Guinea ?: West Bomberai ?; Timor–Alor–Pantar; Alor–Pantar; Teiwa
- Dialects: Teiwa; Sar

Language codes
- ISO 639-3: twe
- Glottolog: teiw1236
- ELP: Teiwa
- Coordinates: 8.38°S 124.17°E

Teiwa (also referred to as Tewa) is a Papuan language spoken on the Pantar island in eastern Indonesia. The island is the second largest in the Alor archipelago, lying just west of the largest island Alor.

Teiwa is a morphosyntactically simple language with little inflection and is as such described as an isolating language, also known as an analytic language. It is pronounced by a complex pronoun system.

== Nomenclature ==
Teiwa is also known as Bahasa Teiwa (the Teiwa language) in Indonesia. Teiwa itself is a nominal compound and can be translated as tei wa, meaning "tree leaf". The term "Teiwa" derives from the name of the main clan that speaks it. Generally, when Teiwa speakers refer to their own language, especially to differentiate it from the national language Indonesian, they call it "pitarau" (our language).

== Classification ==
Teiwa is often classified as part of the Trans-New Guinea language family, but this is disputed. One reason is little lexical proof as well as the large geographical distance from the main island of New Guinea. An alternative classification is as part of the Timor-Alor-Pantar language family, which is approximately 3000 years old. Within this language family, Teiwa is further categorized within the sub-family of the Alor-Pantar languages, which are 20 in number. This classification bases on the high number of cognates as well as very similar pronoun systems.

== Background ==
Teiwa is spoken on the island of Pantar, which is part of the Alor Archipelago, located between Australia and Indonesia. The island is located approximately 1000 km from the main island of New Guinea. It stretches 50 km from north to south, and between 11 and 29 km from east to west. The island is split into two distinct geographic regions: the dry and less populated lowlands in the west, and the highlands in the east, which are mountainous, volcanic and densely populated.

There were 4000 documented native speakers of Teiwa in 2010. The speakers live primarily in the desas (administrative villages in Indonesia) Lebang, Boweli, Kalib, Nule, Kadir, and Madar, a village of 460 inhabitants (as of 2007). Lebang is the main village, where Teiwa was still spoken by most people, young and old. Nevertheless, the national language of Indonesian as well as the Chinese-influenced Alor Malay tend to be spoken by the younger generations and used for teaching in schools. As a result of this dwindling number of native speakers, Teiwa is listed as an endangered language.

The Grammar of Teiwa by Marian Klamer is the only linguistic documentation besides a short word list from Stokhof (1975). Klamer gathered most of her data in the village of Madar.

== Phonology ==
The following is a phonological description of Teiwa:

=== Consonants ===
Teiwa has an inventory of 20 consonants, a high amount relative to other Papuan languages. In the table below, the orthographic representation of the sound is given in brackets to the right. The contrast between the pharyngeal and glottal fricative shows itself as exceptional within the languages of Eastern Indonesia, as is the existence of both liquids /l/ and /r/.

	Bilabial	Labiodental	Alveolar	Palatal	Velar	Uvular	Pharyngeal	Glottal
Nasal	m		n		ŋ ⟨ng⟩			
Plosive	p b		t d		k ɡ	q		ʔ ⟨'⟩
Fricative	ɸ ⟨f⟩	v	s				ħ ⟨x⟩	h
Semivowel	w			j ⟨y⟩				
Trill			r					
Lateral			l					

The allophones of /ɸ/ are [ɸ] and [p]. The allophones of /v/ are [v] and [f].

=== Vowels ===
Teiwa has an inventory of 5 cardinal vowels. The two high vowels occur as short (/i/, /u/) and long (/uː/, /iː/). As in the consonant table, the orthographic representations are given in the brackets to the right.

	Front	Back
High	i iː ⟨ii⟩	u uː ⟨uu⟩
Mid	ɛ ⟨e⟩	ɔ ⟨o⟩
Low	a ⟨aa⟩	ɑ ⟨a⟩

The allophones of /a/ are the short [a] and the long [aː].

== Grammar ==
The grammar of Teiwa is as follows:

=== Grammatical relations ===
Grammatical relations are the relations between argument and predicate. In Teiwa, these are formally expressed through pronouns from the object and subject paradigms, as well as a strict constituent order.

The subject relation is the agent argument of a transitive verb, from hereon denoted with A, or the single argument of an intransitive predicate, from hereon denoted with S. Both are encoded similarly.

The object relation is the non-agent argument of a transitive verb, from hereon denoted with P.

=== Basic constituent order ===
Teiwa is syntactically head-final, with Object-Verb constituent order: preverbal subject and object, sentence final verbs, negations, and conjunctions.

With intransitive verbs, there is SV-order. With transitive verbs, there is APV-order.

S V A P V
{[...ki uwaad nuk]} yaa ø {[bif ga'an]} tu'u
{eagle big one} descend {} {child 3S} knock
'...a big eagle came down [and] picked that child...'

The A of the second (transitive) verb tu'uk coreferences with (shares the same reference as) the S of the first (intransitive) verb yaa in the example above.

A P V S V
{...qau ba a} {[a-sepatu qas]} {usan ga-luxun-luxun ta} a {xer-an pati.}
{good SEQ 3S} {3S-shoe(IND) split} {lift 3S-REDUP-high TOP} 3S {yell-REAL PROG}
'...so he lifts up one side of a shoe very high while he is yelling...'

In this example, the Subject (A) is the pronominal, and the object (P) is the lexical NP (noun phrase).

=== Personal pronouns ===
There are three pronoun paradigms in Teiwa: subject, object, and possessive. The 'theme vowel' for singular pronouns is ⟨a⟩, and for plural pronouns it is ⟨i⟩. The second syllable of the long pronoun is a copy of the theme vowel with the addition of an -n.

There is a contrast of inclusive-exclusive first person plural, one of the most prominent features to diffuse from the Austronesian languages into the Papuan languages.

==== Subject pronouns ====
Subject pronouns appear before the object and verb.

	Long subject pronoun	Short subject pronoun
1s	na'an	na
2s	ha'an	ha
3s	a'an	a
1p.exclusive	ni'in	ni
1p.inclusive	pi'in	pi
2p	yi'in	yi
3p	iman	i, a
3p.elsewhere	i'in	i, a
distributive	ta'an	ta

The long subject pronoun is used to set contrastive focus (me, not you), which can further be marked with la as the focus NP. They look nearly identical to the free object pronouns, save for the 3s and 3p.elsewhere pronouns.

Na'an hamar.
1S.long pray
'I pray [not you].'

Na'an la hamar.
1S.long FOC pray
'I am the one who prays.'

The short subject pronoun is a "reduced pronoun" which can stand alone in place of nominal constituents, and is separable from the verb. Its paradigm is nearly identical to that of the object prefixes, except for the 3s, 3p, and 3p.elsewhere pronouns.

Na hamar.
1S.short pray
'I pray.'

Na g-oqai ga-regan.
1S.short 3S.child 3S.ask
'I asked his child.'

Both the short and long object pronouns can express S and A.

==== Object pronouns ====
	(free) Object pronoun	Object prefix
1s	na'an	n(a)-
2s	ha'an	h(a)-
3s	ga'an	g(a)-, gə-
1p.exclusive	ni'in	n(i)-
1p.inclusive	pi'in	p(i)-
2p	yi'in	y(i),
3p	iman	g(i)-, ga-
3p.elsewhere	gi'in	g(i)-
distributive	ta'an	t(a)-

The underlined pronouns are a reminder of the differences to the long subject pronoun and short subject pronoun paradigms, respectively.

The object prefix has a consonantal and syllabic (in parentheses) form: the consonantal form appears before a verb beginning with a vowel, and the syllabic form appears before a verb beginning with a consonant.

The object pronoun is for both animate and inanimate referents, whereas the object prefix is exclusively for animate referents.

With the 3p (third person plural) object prefix, the differentiation of number is lost. In this case, number is specified through use of the additional pronoun ga'an (singular), iman (plural), or the plural word non in the object NP.

The 3s (third person singular) object pronoun maintains a further purpose as a demonstrative pronoun to introduce new participants into the discourse.

===== Possessive pronouns =====
	Long pronoun	Short pronoun	Prefix
1s	na'an	na	n(a)-
2s	ha'an	ha	h(a)-
3s	a'an	a	g(a)-, a-
1p.exclusive	ni'in	ni	n(i)-
1p.inclusive	pi'in	pi	p(i)-
2p	yi'in	yi	y(i),
3p	iman	-	g(i)-, a-, ga-
3p.elsewhere	gi'in	-	-
distributive	ta'an	ta	t(a)-

The final two pronouns, elsewhere and distributive, are unique. The 3p.elsewhere pronoun is used in a situation where the speaker cannot see the referent, because the referent is somewhere else.

I'in g-oqai ga-wei.
they.elsewhere 3S.child 3S.bathe
'They (elsewhere) bathe/have bathed his child.'

Contrast this with the standard, unmarked form (3p):

Iman g-oqai ga-wei.
they 3S.child 3S.bathe
'They bathe/have bathed his child.'

The distributive possessive pronoun (ta'an, ta, or ta-) refers to a (non-collective) plural number of human referents, often in reciprocal contexts.

Ta'an tara' mis!
DISTR be.in.a.row sit
'Let's sit in a row!' (lit. 'Each (one) sits in a row!')

One more special possessive pronoun is li'in, which marks plurality of the possessor NP, and only as an adnominal modifier.

Compare:

Uy ga-yaf
person 3S.house
'Someone's house, a person's house'

Uy li'in ga-yaf
person their 3S.house
'People's house(s)'

==== Nouns ====
In Teiwa, the noun typically appears as head of the NP. The noun, with a few exceptions, cannot be reduplicated, unlike verbs, adverbs, and adjectives. (See Reduplication below.)

There is no marking for number, gender, or case on nouns. Instead, person and number is marked via a possessor prefix on the noun.

==== Noun phrases ====
In possessed NP's, the possessor (the noun which possesses) precedes the possessee (the noun which is possessed), as in the examples below.

Rai ga-yaf
king 3S-house
'The king's house.'

Pi pi-krian i er a gula' sin.
1P.INCL 1P.INCL.work PROX make 3S finish first
'We first finish our work here.'

In non-possessed NP's, the noun comes first, followed by the modifying element, such as an adjective.

Xaf uwaad
fish big
'A big fish.'

Uy a
person PROX
'This person.'

==== Noun classes ====
The Teiwa nouns can be divided into two main classes: Proper nouns and common nouns.

===== Proper nouns =====
Proper nouns are not modifiable. Examples are listed below.

Male names: Edi, Goli, Lius, Mase, Nabas, Ribu
Female names: Bruang, Leti, Malai, Mani, Sam
Family names: Biri, Blegar, Bui, Lau, Qoli, Ribu, Unu
Clan names: Barawasi, Burilak, Loxoq, Perang Tubi, Qailipi

===== Common nouns =====
The common nouns can be further divided into subclasses:

====== Nouns with alienable possession ======
In this subclass the possessor prefix is optional. Focus can be placed with use of a long pronoun. Examples include: yaf 'house', kon 'shirt', qavif 'goat'.

====== Nouns with inalienable possession ======
Here the possessor prefix is obligatory, to the point that native speakers will not recognize the word without the prefix. Nouns with inalienable possession include body parts, and kinship terms (except for emaq 'wife' where the prefix is optional as with alienable possession).

====== Locational nouns ======
This last subclass of nouns denote location. Examples include: wanan 'side', fan 'front', siban 'behind', ragan 'outside', tag 'up(stairs); above speaker (relatively close)'.

Uy ragan me
people outside be.in
'Some people are outside' / 'Someone is outside'

==== Nominalization ====
There is no dedicated morphology for nominalization in Teiwa. Instead the third person (3p) possessor prefix -ga has a secondary function of attaching to the root form of adjectives, locational nouns, adverbs, and question words.

=== Verbs ===
Teiwa verbs carry no marking for case or gender. There is only one verbal suffix;

-(a)n for the marking of realis status. Only verbs take an object prefix. Inflected prefixes index person and number traits of animate objects on the verb. Subjects and inanimate objects are not indexed on the verb.

Teiwa has intransitive and transitive verbs. The transitive verbs are monotransitive, meaning they have a single grammatical object.

==== Verb classes ====
===== Transitive verbs =====
The transitive verbs in Teiwa can be divided into numerous sub classes, based on how they encode animate and inanimate objects differently. In this case, animate or inanimate refers explicitly to a third person referent, since first and second person referents are inherently animate.

Class (i)
Verbs with an object prefix, with an animate object ("sb-somebody")

This class expresses the object with an object-marking prefix on the verb. The prefix marks for person and number. The lexical NP is optional and may be used to clarify or disambiguate the referent.

Examples of verbs are: an ‘give sb’, ‘an ‘sell to sb’, ayas ‘throw at sb’, bun ‘answer sb’, fin ‘catch sb’, liin ‘invite sb’, regan ‘ask sb’, sas ‘feed sb’, walas ‘tell sb’, wei ‘bathe sb’

Examples of such verbs in sentence constructions:

A qavif ga-uyan gi si...
3S goat 3S.search go SIM
'He went searching for [a] goat...'

The prefix ga- on the verb -uyan marks for third person singular object, that is for qavif, 'goat'. Goat is an animate object.

A yivar ga-walas a wa...
3S dog 3S.tell 3S say
'He told [his] dog...'

Here similarly, the prefix ga- on the verb -walas marks for third person singular object, that is for yivar, 'dog'. Dog is an animate object.

Class (ii)
Verbs without an object prefix, with inanimate object ("sth-something")

Here the verb encodes the object as a separate nominal constituent. In this class the encoding with a prefix is disallowed.

Examples of such verbs are: bali ‘see sth’, ol ‘buy sth’, paai ‘cut sth in many small pieces’, put ‘cut off (grass)’ An example in a sentence construction:

...i'in i-xaf uwaad la boqai dau-an na.
they.elsewhere 3P.fish big FOC cut.up cook-REAL eat
'...they cut up their big fish, cooked and ate [it]'

The verbs in this sentence have no object prefix, and the object 'fish' is inanimate (because it is no longer living).

Class (iii)
Transitive verbs that take either animate or inanimate objects

iiia. Transitive verbs with prefixed animate object OR free (unfixed) inanimate object

With free inanimate object (object prefix not bound to verb).

Na ga'an mar.
1S 3S take
'I take/get it.'

With prefixed animate object

Na ga-mar.
1S 3S-take
'I follow him/her.'

Notice the important difference in meaning with the use a prefixed pronoun versus a free pronoun!

iiib. Verbs with an animate OR inanimate object, both as a prefix

Third person object prefixes marking animate or inanimate:

3sg inanimate object	3sg animate object
ga-	ga'-
ge-	
g-	

The contrasts are illustrated in the below translations:

wulul	'speak, talk, tell'
ga'-wulul	'talk with sb, tell sb'
ga-wulul	'talk about sth, tells sth'

A glottal stop is used for animate objects. The canonical form is used for inanimate objects.

===== Sound verbs =====
An interesting class of verbs constituting verbs for sounds made by animals or objects.

aga-aga	sound to call a dog
ago-ago	sound to call a dog (remote)
sika	sound to chase away a dog
sumax	sound to chase away a goat
burax	sound to chase away chickens
kuru-kuru	sound to call chickens
xo'	to bark (dog)
ox	to grunt (pig)
qau	to scream (pig)
hong	dog's sound ('woof')
kokoko	chicken's sound ('tock-tock')
quququ	'cock-a-doodle-doo'
me'eh	goat's sound
paq	sound of a rock that is crushing corn
qabunggat	splashing sound of rock in water
tadunggat	dry sound of rock falling on land
saxa'	flapping sound of something light falling (e.g. sandals on street)

==== Experiencer predicates ====
These are predicates formed with the bodypart noun -om 'inside'

n-om quun
1S-inside be.sure
'I am smart/clever.'

n-om qau
1S-inside good
'I am happy.'

n-om siis
1S-inside dry
'I am thirsty'

n-om par
1S-inside defeated
'I am annoyed (at s.b.)'

n-om qalixil
1S-inside itchy
'I am angry'

n-om mai
1S-inside store/keep
'I am planning/I plan'

n-om bangan
1S-inside see
'I want/like'

n-om ga-regan
1S-inside 3S-ask
'I think/say to myself'

n-om ga-i'
1S-inside 3S-sick
'I feel pity for him'

=== Reduplication ===
Reduplication is a morphological process to express greater intensity or the repeated/ongoing nature of an event. In Teiwa, the entire root is copied; there exists no productive process for syllable reduplication.

of verbs

tewar-tewar
REDUP-walk
'walk on and on'

tib-tib
REDUP-provide.for
'exactly enough'

haqax-haqax
REDUP-breathe
'take a few rests'

of verbs with the realis suffix

Reduplication of the entire stem including the realis suffix takes place. Only verbs can be inflected for realis mood.

tii'in-tii'in
REDUP-[sleep-REAL]
'being asleep', 'sleep on and on'

miran-mir-an
REDUP-[ascend-REAL]
'climb on and on', 'continue to climb'

moxodan-moxod-an
REDUP-[drop-REAL]
'let fall, drop down'

of adverbials

wek-wek
REDUP-behind
'behind'

bas-bas*
REDUP-tomorrow
'usually'

bes-bes
REDUP-morning
'good morning'

of adjectives

musaq-musaq
REDUP-shattered
'very much shattered'

[qa'an-qa'an]'an*
[REDUP-black-]v-REAL
'be black-REAL' > 'something black'

*The adjectival base is first turned into a verb through reduplication, in order to allow the realis suffix to be reduplicated (only verbs can be reduplicated with a realis suffix).

of numerals

Iman nuk-nuk / raq-raq / yerig-yerig aria-n.
they REDUP-one {} REDUP-two {} REDUP-three arrive-REAL
'They arrive one by one, two by two, three by three.'

of nouns

Reduplication of nouns is rarer, and does not serve to express plurality of distributivity.

mug-mug
REDUP-mountain.top
'be hilly' (something attributiv)

war-war
REDUP-day
'day after day' (something adverbial)

== Kinship ==
The Teiwa live in exogamous, patrilineal clans: the children belong to the clan of the father. The term "Teiwa" refers to a group of (sub) clans with the same ancestors. The Teiwa branch into two moieties (halves), which are separate genealogical supergroups, each of which includes multiple clans.

Teiwa
I.	II.
Baraqala	Lambar
La Builan	Kakalau
Salanggalu	Lau Wad
Maligi	Loxog
Hukung	Kaloman Goqar
Qailipi	

Children are named with 1) clan name, 2) given name 3) father's family name, for example Teiwa Jance Wa'ng.

=== Kinship system ===
The kinship system of the Teiwa is based on cross-cousins. This means that the children of same-sex siblings are considered to be siblings (brother, sister), and therefore not fit for marriage with one another. Children of non-same sex siblings of the parents are seen as cross-cousins and are the perfect candidates for marriage with each other. These children are also in a different clan than the children of the same-sex siblings of the parents.

=== Kinship terms ===
The main kinship terms are listed here:

emaq	wife
misi	husband
bif	child, 'younger sibling'
biar (kriman)	children
na-gas qai	my sister
n-ian qai	my brother
n-ian	(female) cousin of ego, in other clan
na-dias	(male) cousin of ego, in other clan
na-rat (emaq)	daughter of ego's brother, in other clan (potential daughter-in-law)
na'ii	son of ego's brother, in other clan (potential son-in-law)
na-rata'	my grandfather/mother
na-rat qai	my grandchild

From the point of view of female ego:

The "classificatory siblings" refer to the actual siblings, as well as the children of the mother's sister and the father's brother. As it is considered rude to call family members by their given name, these siblings are addressed as matu' when older and bif when younger, and ka'au when the same sex as the speaker.

The "classificatory parents" are the father's brother (n-oma 'my father'), as well as the mother's sister (na-xala 'my mother'). Each person therefore has two sets of parents.
