= Kaera language =

Trans–New Guinea language spoken in Indonesia

Kaera
- Native to: Indonesia
- Region: Pantar Island
- Native speakers: 5,500 (2014)
- Language family: Trans–New Guinea ?: West Bomberai ?; Timor–Alor–Pantar; Alor–Pantar; Kaera

Language codes
- ISO 639-3: jka
- Glottolog: kaer1234
- ELP: Kaera

Kaera is a Papuan language spoken on the northeastern coast of Pantar Island in the Alor Archipelago of Indonesia. It belongs to the Timor-Alor-Pantar language family. Kaera is used alongside Indonesian in religious contexts, but not used in education.

== Phonology ==
All the information in this section is from Klamer's sketch grammar.

=== Consonants ===
Consonant phonemes
	Labial		Alveolar		Palatal	Velar		Glottal
Plosive	p	b	t	d		k	g	
Fricative			s			x		(h)
Nasal		m		n			ŋ	
Trill				r				
Lateral approximant				l				
Approximant		w			j			

=== Vowels ===
Monophthong phonemes
	Front	Central	Back
Close	i • iː		u • uː
Mid	ɛ • ɛː		ɔ • ɔː
Open		a • aː	
