= Wersing language =

Language of Indonesia

Wersing
- Kolana
- Native to: Indonesia
- Region: Alor
- Native speakers: 3,700 (2014)
- Language family: Trans–New Guinea ?: West Bomberai ?; Timor–Alor–Pantar; Alor–Pantar; Alor; East; Wersing
- Dialects: Kolana; Langkuru; Maneta

Language codes
- ISO 639-3: kvw
- Glottolog: wers1238
- ELP: Wersing
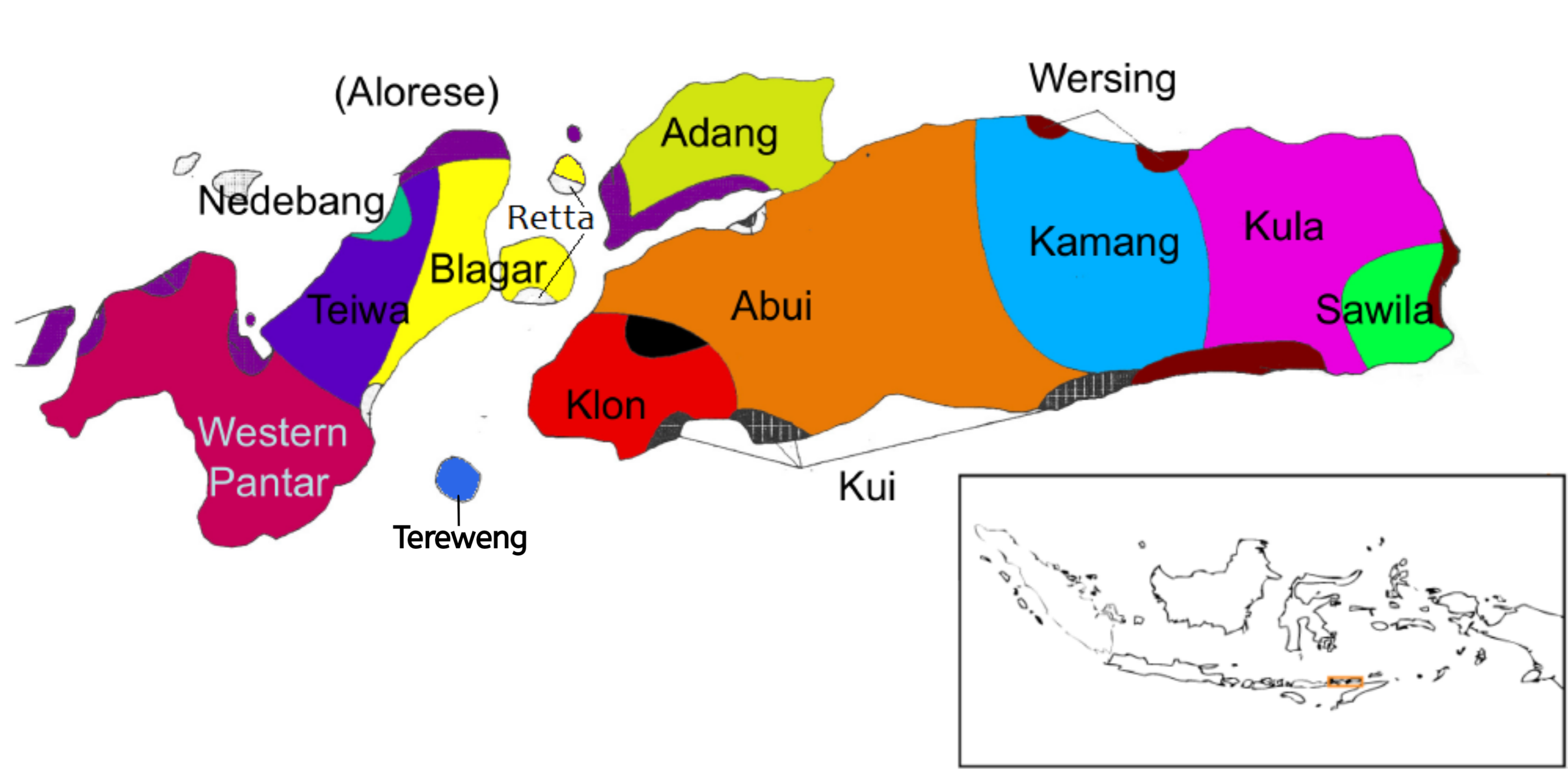
- Languages of the Alor Islands. Wersing is shown at four locations around the east coast.

The Wersing language, also known as Kolana after its primary dialect, is spoken in scattered settlements around the coast of Alor in Indonesia. Due to this settlement pattern, Wersing speakers are in contact with Abui and Kamang speakers and often have some competence in these languages. Though not closely related, it has cultural connections with Tukudede on the neighboring island of Timor.

== Phonology ==
Wersing consonant phonemes
		Bilabial	Alveolar	Palatal	Velar
Nasal		m	n	ɲ ⟨ny⟩	
Plosive	voiceless	p	t		k
Plosive	voiced	b	d		ɡ
Fricative			s		
Semivowel		w		j ⟨y⟩	
Lateral			l		
Trill			r		

Wersing vowel phonemes
	Front	Central	Back
Close	i		u
Mid	ɛ ⟨e⟩		ɔ ⟨o⟩
Open		a	
