= Afoa language =

The Afoa language may refer to:

- Kafoa language or Jafoo, a Papuan language of Alor Island in the Alor archipelago of Indonesia
- Tauade language, a Papuan language of New Guinea
