= Kui language (Indonesia) =

Language spoken in Indonesia

Kui
- Native to: Indonesia
- Region: Alor Island, East Nusa Tenggara
- Native speakers: 100 (2018)
- Language family: Trans–New Guinea ?: West Bomberai ?; Timor–Alor–Pantar; Alor–Pantar; Alor; Kui

Language codes
- ISO 639-3: kvd
- Glottolog: kuii1253
- ELP: Kui (Indonesia)

Kui is a Timor–Alor–Pantar language spoken in several enclaves on Alor Island, East Nusa Tenggara, Indonesia. The language is called masin lak in Kui. Although the exact number of speakers is unknown, Kui is an endangered language since speakers are shifting to Alor Malay.

Kui is mainly spoken in the towns of Moru, Bouraga and Lerabarang. Kirramung and Kui have some sort of dialect relationship, being considered by some as being the same language and some others as being two different languages. This is typical of Timor-Alor-Pantar (TAP) languages. It has verb-final word order which means that the verb comes last in a sentence, unlike in English where the verb usually comes in the middle.

== Phonology ==
=== Consonants ===
Consonant phonemes are shown in the chart below. Marginal phonemes are enclosed in parentheses.

Consonant phonemes
| | Bilabial | | Alveolar | | Palatal | Velar | | Glottal |
|---|---|---|---|---|---|---|---|---|
| Plosive | p | b | t | d | | k | g | (ʔ) |
| Fricative | | | s | | | | | |
| Nasal | | m | | n | (ɲ) | | ŋ | |
| Affricate | | | | | (d͡ʒ) | | | |
| Rhotic | | | | r | | | | |
| Lateral approximant | | | | l | (ʎ) | | | |
| Approximant | | w | | | j | | | |

=== Vowels ===
==== Monophthongs ====
Monophthong phonemes
| | Front | Central | Back |
|---|---|---|---|
| Close | i • iː | | u • uː |
| Close-mid | e | | o • oː |
| Open-mid | ɛ • ɛː | | |
| Open | | a • aː | |
