= Adang language =

Alor language spoken in Indonesia

Adang
- Native to: Indonesia
- Region: Alor Peninsula, Alor Island
- Native speakers: 12,200 (2013–2014)
- Language family: Trans–New Guinea ?: West Bomberai ?; Timor–Alor–Pantar; Alor–Pantar; Alor; West; Straits; Adang

Language codes
- ISO 639-3: Variously: adn – Adang hmu – Hamap klz – Kabola
- Glottolog: adan1252
- ELP: Adang

Adang is a Papuan language of the Timor–Alor–Pantar language family spoken on the island of Alor in Indonesia. The language is agglutinative. The Hamap dialect is sometimes treated as a separate language; on the other hand, Kabola, which is sociolinguistically distinct, is sometimes included. Adang, Hamap, and Kabola are considered a dialect chain. Adang is endangered as fewer speakers raise their children in Adang, instead opting for Indonesian.

== Phonology ==
=== Consonants ===
Consonants
		Labial	Alveolar	Postalveolar	Velar	Glottal
Nasal		m	n	(ɲ)	ŋ	
Plosive/ Affricate	voiceless	p	t	(t͡ʃ)	k	ʔ
Plosive/ Affricate	voiced	b	d	d͡ʒ	g	
Fricative		f	(s)			h
Lateral			l			
Trill			r			

Notes:

- Post-alveolar [t͡ʃ, d͡ʒ, ɲ] are palatalized versions of their alveolar counterparts [t, d, n] and occur when following a diphthong ending in high front vowel [i]. The [i] has been deleted in some cases, resulting in new minimal pairs contrasting alveolar and post-alveolar variants. The extent of this sound change differs between speakers and Robinson and Haan only consider [d͡ʒ] to have become a fully separate phoneme. Because it is the result of a process limited to the syllable coda, this new phoneme only occurs syllable-finally.
- In certain dialects /l/ is deleted following a diphthong ending in [i].
- /g/ occurs in syllable-initial position, but the only cases in which it does syllable-finally are onomatopoeic forms.
- /s/ only occurs syllable-finally in loanwords.
- /f/ never occurs in syllable-final position.

=== Vowels ===
Vowel phonemes of Adang
		Front	Central	Back
High		i		u
Mid	Tense	e		o
Mid	Lax	ɛ		ɔ
Low			a	

Diphthongs are /ai/, /oi/, /eu/, /au/ and /ou/. Vowel sequences that begin with a lax mid vowel (i.e. /ɔ/ or /ɛ/) cannot be diphthongs and are always disyllabic.

=== Phonotactics ===
Adang syllable structure is (C)V(C). V can either be a monophthong or a diphthong. C can be almost any consonant. Exceptions are /f/, which never occurs in syllable final position, and /d͡ʒ/, which only ever occurs in final position. /s/ and /g/ only occur syllable-finally in specific categories of words (i.e. loanwords and onomatopoeic words, resp.).

== Grammar ==
=== Syntax ===
Clauses in Adang are predicate-final: intransitive verbal predicates have Subject-Verb order and transitive predicates follow Agent-Patient-Verb order. In ditransitive constructions the theme precedes the recipient. Adang has accusative alignment. Some sentence examples:

Ni mop.
1PL.EXCL.SUBJ sleep
We sleep. (Robinson & Haan 2014:233)

Manu sɛi pataŋ.
Manu water boil
Manu boiled water. (Robinson & Haan 2014:233)

John sɛŋ Rudy ʔ-ɛn.
John money Rudy 3.OBJ-give
John gave Rudy money. (Robinson & Haan 2014:233)

A nominal predicate also follows the subject (note that Adang does not use a copula):

Ni-maŋ Lukas.
1.PL.EXCL.INAL-father Lukas
Our father is Lukas. (Robinson & Haan 2014:233)

=== Negation ===
A clause is negated by placing negator nanɛ or nɛnɛ after the predicate. Besides nanɛ there are two negative particles: ʔɛ and haʔai. ʔɛ is used to limit the scope of negator nanɛ by placing ʔɛ in front of the negated element. In this case nanɛ must still succeed the predicate:

Heni guru nɛnɛ.
Heni teacher NEG
Heni is not a teacher (Robinson & Haan 2014:238)

Fali ho ʔɛ u-baŋ nanɛ.
price DEF NEG APPL-say NEG
The price has not been mentioned. (Robinson & Haan 2014:239)

Nanɛ may also be used on its own for rules or general prohibitions. Alternatively, ʔɛ at the end of a clause expresses a negative imperative (without nanɛ). Compare:

Sam don nɛnɛ!
go shop NEG
No (going) shopping! (Robinson & Haan 2014:239)

Sam don ʔɛ!
go shop NEG.IMP
Don’t go shopping! (Robinson & Haan 2014:239)

To make a negative imperative more polite add haʔai to the beginning of the sentence. Lastly, the verb aʔai negates existence or possession.

Guru aʔai.
teacher NEG.EXIST
There is no teacher. (Robinson & Haan 2014:240)

=== Questions ===
Adang question words are anɔ ‘who’, naba ‘what’, tarɔ ‘where’, tarɔni ‘how/why’ and den ‘how many/when’. They remain in situ. Depending on whether they replace a subject or an object they can be followed by the subject focus marker so or the object focus marker fe.

Naba (so) a-nɔ?
what FOC.SBJ 2SG.OBJ-affect
What happened to you? (Robinson & Haan 2014:241)

Yes–no questions are distinguished from declarative sentences by rising intonation on the last syllable.

== Nouns ==
The structure of the Adang noun phrase:

(possessor + possessive.pronoun) N V CLF V numeral quantifier REL DEM/DEF (Robinson & Haan 2014:242)

=== Determiners and demonstratives ===
A demonstrative or the definite determiner ho is placed at the end of the noun phrase. The demonstrative paradigm shows a distinction between proximal (hɔʔɔ) and distal, and distal demonstratives further distinguish between location above the speaker (hɛtɔ), below the speaker (hɛpɔ) and level with the speaker (hɛmɔ).

=== Possession ===
Nouns are divided into three classes according to their behavior concerning possession: the first class must with occur possessive pronominal prefixes at all times (inalienable), the second never occurs with possessive pronominal prefixes and instead uses independent possessive pronouns (alienable), and the third only occurs with possessive pronominal prefixes when possessed. The prefix sets of the first and third classes are different. Next to the independent possessive pronouns of alienable nouns, Adang has a set of contrastive possessive pronouns. These may occur before or without alienable pronouns, and also together with possessive prefixes. They can also occur without a possessed noun.

Possessive prefixes and pronouns
	Inalienable poss. prefix	Alienable poss. pronouns	Optional poss. prefix	Contrastive poss. pronouns
1SG	n(a)-	nɔ	nɛ-	ne
1PL.INCL.DISTR	t(a)-	tɔ	tɛ-	ni(e)
1PL.EXCL	ni-	ni	niɛ-	pi(e)
1PL.INCL	pi-	pi	piɛ-	te
2SG	(a)-	ɔ	ɛ-	e
2PL	i-	i	iɛ-	i(e)
3	ʔ(a)-	ʔɔ	ʔɛ-	ʔ(e)
3.REFL	s(a)-	sɔ	sɛ-	s(e)

=== Attributes ===
Adang uses intransitive verbs to modify nouns, as it has no separate word class of adjectives. In the noun phrase they may occur before or after the classifier (CLF in noun phrase template above). Locative or directional verbs also occur in this position (see Location and direction).

[Supi]_{NP} [ab min]_{NP} taraʔ.
3PL fish die collect
They collected dead fish. (Robinson & Haan 2014:248)

=== Classifiers ===
Classifiers occur between a noun and a number larger than one. They classify nouns by their size, shape and flexibility, but some nouns may take different classifiers to gain different interpretations. Out of the many Adang classifiers, paʔ is the most common and is used for many different kinds of objects.

ʔaburiŋ paʔ ut.
arrow CLF four
four arrows (Robinson & Haan 2014:250)

Other examples include pir (used for small, round objects), beh (flat, flexible objects) and ʔafail (small, rigid objects).

== Pronouns ==
Adang has many independent pronouns, organized in six paradigms. Two of these paradigms are of independent possessive pronouns, one occurring with alienable nouns and another fulfilling a contrastive function in combination with alienable nouns (with or without regular possessive pronoun) or inalienable nouns (with a possessive prefix). Contrastive possessive pronouns are also used without a noun. Besides regular possessive pronouns and contrastive possessive pronouns (see Possession), the four other paradigms are: subject pronouns, object pronouns, numbered pronouns and alone pronouns.

	Subject pronouns	Object pronouns	Numbered pronouns	Alone pronouns
1SG	na	nari	-	nɔlɔ
1PL.EXCL	ni	niri	ninaŋ	nilɔ
1PL.INCL	pi	piri	pinaŋ	pilɔ
1PL.DISTR	-	tari	-	-
2SG	a	ari	-	ɔlɔ
2PL	i	iri	inaŋ	ilɔ
3SG	sa	ʔari	-	sɔlɔ
3SG.REFL	sa	sari	-	sɔlɔ
3PL	supi	(supi) ʔari	sanaŋ	sɔlɔ
3PL.REFL	supi	sari	sanaŋ	sɔlɔ

=== Subject pronouns ===
Subject pronouns are used for the subjects of transitive or intransitive verbs. They can be used to refer to any animate subject, human or non-human. Only in very limited circumstances can they refer to inanimate subjects.

=== Object pronouns ===
An object pronoun indicates the object of a transitive verb. Some verbs do not use object pronouns, but use prefixes instead (see Object prefixes). Object pronouns and object prefixes cannot co-occur. Supi can precede third person ʔari to make clear that it had plural meaning.

Sa [supi ʔari]_{NP} bɛh.
3SG.SBJ 3PL 3.OBJ hit
S/he hit them. (Robinson & Haan 2014:261)

=== Numbered pronouns ===
A numbered pronoun is used when a pronoun is modified by a number greater than one or the question word den (‘how many?’). It can be used for both subjects and objects, either on its own or following a regular subject pronoun or object pronoun.

Sanaŋ den John bɛh?
3PL.NMBR how.many John hit
How many of them hit John? (Robinson & Haan 2014:263)

=== Alone pronouns ===
Alone pronouns refer to a person or a group of people doing something on their own. They can refer to the subject or the object of a clause. If an alone pronoun refers to a subject it may co-index a preceding argument, but this is not necessary. If it indicates an object it has to occur together with an object pronoun.

(I) ilɔ sam don.
2PL.SUBJ 2PL.ALONE go shop
You go shopping by yourselves. (Robinson & Haan 2014:265)

== Verbs ==
Verbs in Adang may take pronominal and/or valency-increasing prefixes. Pronominal prefixes mostly serve to mark objects on (di)transitive verbs. For some verbs object-marking is obligatory, while for others it is optional, and some verbs are never marked for object. Verbs that do take object-prefixes are a closed class. Whether a verb selects a pronominal object prefix or an independent object pronoun is a lexical property of the verb, and the two cannot occur together. Even so object-marking is influenced somewhat by the animacy of the object. It is not necessary for a marked object to be animate, or for an animate object to be marked on the verb, but in the majority of cases object-marking goes together with an animate object.

The transitive verbs that always remain unprefixed include verbs that only appear with inanimate objects, verbs that only appear with animate objects, and verbs that may appear with either.

There are four series of pronominal prefixes (some of which also increase a verb’s valency), and two separate prefixes that increase valency.

	Object	Allative 1	Allative 2	Ablative
1SG	n(a)-	nɛ-	nɔ-	nel-
1PL.INCL.DISTR	t(a)-	tɛ-	tɔ-	tel-
1PL.EXCL	ni-	niɛ-	niɔ-	niel-
1PL.INCL	pi-	piɛ-	piɔ-	piel-
2SG	(a)-	ɛ-	ɔ-	el-
2PL	i-	iɛ-	iɔ-	iel-
3	ʔ(a)-	ʔɛ-	ʔɔ-	ʔel-
3.REFL	s(a)-	sɛ-	sɔ-	sel-

Adang makes use of serial verb constructions and also uses verbs to indicate direction and location.

=== Pronominal prefixes ===
==== Object prefixes ====
Some transitive verbs that select object prefixes instead of object pronouns, cannot occur without them. While the majority of these verbs have animate objects, a few verbs that always take inanimate objects belong to this class. Some verbs that may have objects of varying animacy are also included. Example of an object prefix:

Bel Bain_{i} ʔ_{i}-eh.
dog Bain 3.OBJ.bite
A dog bit Bain. (Robinson & Haan 2014:267)

It is possible for a verb to select an object prefix for an animate object, but remain unprefixed when it has an inanimate object. Compare: -puɲ ‘catch/hold someone’ and puɲ ‘hold something’.

==== Allative prefixes ====
With an allative prefix a verbs valency is increased by one argument. It indicates movement toward that argument. There are two sets of allative prefixes. Of the two allative paradigms the first set can turn verbs from intransitive to transitive, from transitive to ditransitive. The second set is only found on three verbs: lap ‘search’, lɔfɛ ‘call’ and tain ‘release’. An example from each set of prefixes:

Set 1:

Valdi bal nɛ-a-golaŋ.
Valdi ball 1SG.ALL-CAUS-roll
Valdi rolled a ball to me. (Robinson & Haan 2014:269)

Set 2:

Namɛ nu ʔai tumɔʔ ʔɔ-lɔfɛ.
person one person old 3.ALL.call
Someone calls to the old man. (Robinson & Haan 2014:269)

==== Ablative prefixes ====
Ablative prefixes also increase the valency of a verb to indicate movement away from its referent. This movement may be physical or metaphorical. The collection of verbs that can have an ablative prefix is very limited and consists of five verbs: papaɲ ‘imitate’, mala ‘shy’, baroc ‘afraid’, tafuniŋ ‘hide’ and tɛʔɛŋ ‘run’.

Supi John ʔel-tafuniŋ eh.
3PL John 3.ABL-hide PROG
They are hiding from John. (Robinson & Haan 2014:268)

=== Valency-increasing prefixes ===
==== Applicative prefix ====
Applicative prefix u- increases a verb’s valency by introducing a theme to a sentence. Other possible roles of an added argument are goals or beneficiaries. If it occurs together with a pronominal prefix, the applicative suffix precedes the pronominal suffix. Example:

Roni nari u-hɔʔ.
Roni 1SG.OBJ APPL-come
Roni came toward me (for a purpose). (Robinson & Haan 2014:270)

==== Causative prefix ====
The causative prefix adds a ‘causer’ to a proposition, thereby increasing a verb’s valency. There are only ten intransitive verbs that may carry a causative prefix. These include muj ‘fall down’, mih ‘sit’ and tɔh ‘stand’. The prefix almost always occurs together with a pronominal prefix, which precedes it. The only exception is ʔɔl ‘fall over’. An example:

John ʔɛdai n-a-muj.
John almost 1SG.OBJ-CAUS-fall
John almost made me fall down. (Robinson & Haan 2014:272)

=== Serial verb constructions ===
Serial verb constructions are very common in Adang. Serial verb constructions consist of multiple verbs combined into a single predicate, and share arguments and features such as aspect and negation. Symmetrical serial verb constructions consist solely of verbs from open classes, while an SVC is asymmetrical when it contains one verb from a closed class, which must precede the other verb(s). Symmetrical SVCs describe a sequence of events or the manner of an event.

Sa mih aɛr.
3SG.SBJ sit rest
He sat down and rested. (Robinson & Haan 2014:276)

Roni lamɛ hanɔʔaŋ.
Roni walk hurry
Roni walked hurriedly. (Robinson & Haan 2014:276)

Asymmetrical serial verb constructions have several different uses, which are detailed below.

==== Comitative SVCs ====
Comitative constructions use the verb -ra ‘be with’ before the main verb.

Adi ni-ra mih.
Adi 1PL.EXCL.OBJ-with sit/stay
Adi stayed with us. (Robinson & Haan 2014:277)

==== Causative SVCs ====
In causative constructions the causative verb also precedes the main verb. Three verbs can be used in a causative SVC. These are -nɔʔ ‘affect’, -hou ‘command’ and -ɛn ‘give’. -ɛn means ‘help’ in a causative SVC:

Ella kod n-ɛn maŋ.
Ella shirt 1SG.OBJ-give put.on
Ella helped me put on my shirt. (Robinson & Haan 2014:278)

==== Directional SVCs ====
In a directional serial verb construction an intransitive directional verb (e.g. sam ‘go (far)’, ma ‘come’) indicates the direction of an event. The directional verb precedes the main, open-class verb.

Rin sam don.
Rin go(far) shop
Rin went shopping. (Robinson & Haan 2014:278)

==== Instrumental SVCs ====
The instrumental serial verb construction is the only way in Adang to introduce an instrument argument. It uses the verb puin ‘hold’:

Namɛ duir puin napah tatɔʔ.
person knife hold cloth cut
Someone cuts a cloth with a knife. (Robinson & Haan 2014:279)

==== Theme SVCs ====
A theme may be introduced by adding med ‘take’ before the open-class verb. While this construction is common in everyday speech, the verb med is entirely optional.

Ince sɛŋ (med) dɛc mi.
Ince money (take) wallet put
Ince put some money into wallets. (Robinson & Haan 2014:280)

=== Location and direction ===
Verbs are also used to indicate direction or location, often in serial verb constructions. They cannot be intransitive, as they must have a subject and a location argument.

Anu banaŋ mi.
deer forest in
There are deer in the forest. (Robinson & Haan 2014:236)

Na ʔarabah mi mih.
1SG.SUBJ Kalabahi in sit/live
I live in Kalabahi. (Robinson & Haan 2014:235)

The verb lɛ ‘to, towards’ also forms a part of directional and locational compound verbs, for instance talɛ ‘up on’ and adaŋlɛ ‘away from the speaker toward the mountain’.

Locative deictics in Adang are considered to be verbs, because they can occur in serial verb constructions and modify nouns. Locative deictics distinguish between proximal (ʔɔŋ ‘here’), distal above the speaker (tɔŋ ‘there (above)’), distal level with the speaker (mɔŋ ‘there (level)’) and distal below the speaker (pɔŋ ‘there (below)’). Deictics may stand alone as predicates. Examples:

Aru nu tɔŋ.
deer one there.above
There is a deer up there. (Robinson & Haan 2014:237)

[Ti taʔat ho]_{NP} [mɔŋ bana mi tufeh.]_{PREDICATE}
tree dry DEF there.level forest in stand.PROG
The dry stick is standing over there in the forest. (Robinson & Haan 2014:237)

== Aspect ==
Adang expresses aspect with aspectual particles at the end of the predicate. Aspects that are grammatically marked in Adang are progressive, perfective and inceptive. The progressive particle is eh, the perfective particle is am, and the inceptive particle is eham. These particles do not have to be combined with a verbal predicate; they may also be used with a nominal predicate.

== Kinship terms ==
Adang kinship terminology features no obligatory distinction between siblings, parallel-cousins and cross-cousins. There is a distinction between younger and older siblings/cousins, respectively diʔ and matu, and a single term for the same group: -uding. These terms are all gender-neutral, but can be modified with ob ‘female’ or lote ‘male’ (e.g. no’uding lote ‘my sister’).

For biological siblings matu or diʔ is preferred, but -uding is also acceptable. Conversely, parallel-cousins are generally called -uding but may sometimes be called matu/diʔ. Cross-cousins are almost exclusively referred to as -uding.
