= Woisika language =

Language in Indonesia

Woisika
- Kamang
- Native to: Indonesia
- Region: Alor Island
- Native speakers: 6,000 (2014)
- Language family: Trans–New Guinea ?: West Bomberai ?; Timor–Alor–Pantar; Alor–Pantar; Alor; Woisika

Language codes
- ISO 639-3: woi
- Glottolog: kama1365
- ELP: Kamang

Woisika, also known as Kamang, is a Papuan language of Alor Island of Indonesia. The three main dialects are Western Kamang, Lowland Kamang, and Upland Kamang. Dialects also include Lembur, Sibo, Kamang, Tiayai, Watang, Kamana-Kamang. They may constitute more than one language. Kamang is an endangered language, since children usually only have passive competence of the language, and instead are shifting to Malay.

Speakers may prefer the term Kamang to refer to the speech community as a whole; Woisika is a village name.

== Phonology ==
=== Consonants ===
Woisika consonant phonemes
		Bilabial	Alveolar	Palatal	Velar	Glottal
Nasal		m	n		ŋ ⟨ng⟩	
Plosive	voiceless	p	t		k	(ʔ) ⟨'⟩
Plosive	voiced	b	d		ɡ	
Fricative		ɸ ⟨f⟩	s			(h)
Semivowel		w		j ⟨y⟩		
Lateral			l			

/h/ and /ʔ/ are marginal. /r/ is rare in initial and final position. Word-final /s/ is only in loan words.

The consonant /ŋ/ is not found word-initially, and /f/ is not found word-finally.

=== Vowels ===
Woisika vowel phonemes
	Front		Central		Back	
Close	i	iː ⟨ii⟩			u	uː ⟨uu⟩
Mid	e	eː ⟨ee⟩			o	oː ⟨oo⟩
Open			a	aː ⟨aa⟩		

== Grammar ==
=== Serial verb constructions ===
Kamang has serial verb constructions.

Mooi bong nok kok silang dii
banana tree one fall.down descend lie
'A banana tree came falling down.'

Afunaa yakii me noowaai.
a-funaa ga-kii me noo-waai.
3.PAT-face 3.PAT-turn come 3.AST-face
'Turn and face me.'

=== Valence ===
Examples with avalent, monovalent, bivalent, and trivalent verbs are shown below.

Avalent

Itunma
itun-ma
late.afternoon-PFV
'It's late afternoon.'

Monovalent

Markus gamanteima
Markus ga-mantei-ma
Markus 3.PAT-thirst-PFV
'Markus is thirsty already.'

Bivalent

Na Markus gatakma.
na Markus ga-tak-ma
1SG.AGT Markus 3.PAT-see-PFV
'I have seen Markus'

Trivalent

Markus patei me dumma wotulen.
Markus patei me dum=a go-tulen
Markus corn TAKE child=SPEC 3.LOC-divide
'Markus divides corn amongst the children.'

== Riddles ==
Woisika riddles relate to animals, the human body, human artifacts, natural phenomena, crops and other foods, among others.
