= Blagar language =

Language in Indonesia

Blagar
- pi abaŋ hur
- Native to: Indonesia
- Region: Pantar Island
- Ethnicity: Blagar
- Native speakers: 10,000 (2014)
- Language family: Trans–New Guinea ?: West Bomberai ?; Timor–Alor–Pantar; Alor–Pantar; Alor; West; Straits; Blagaric; Blagar
- Writing system: Latin script

Language codes
- ISO 639-3: beu
- Glottolog: blag1240
- ELP: Blagar
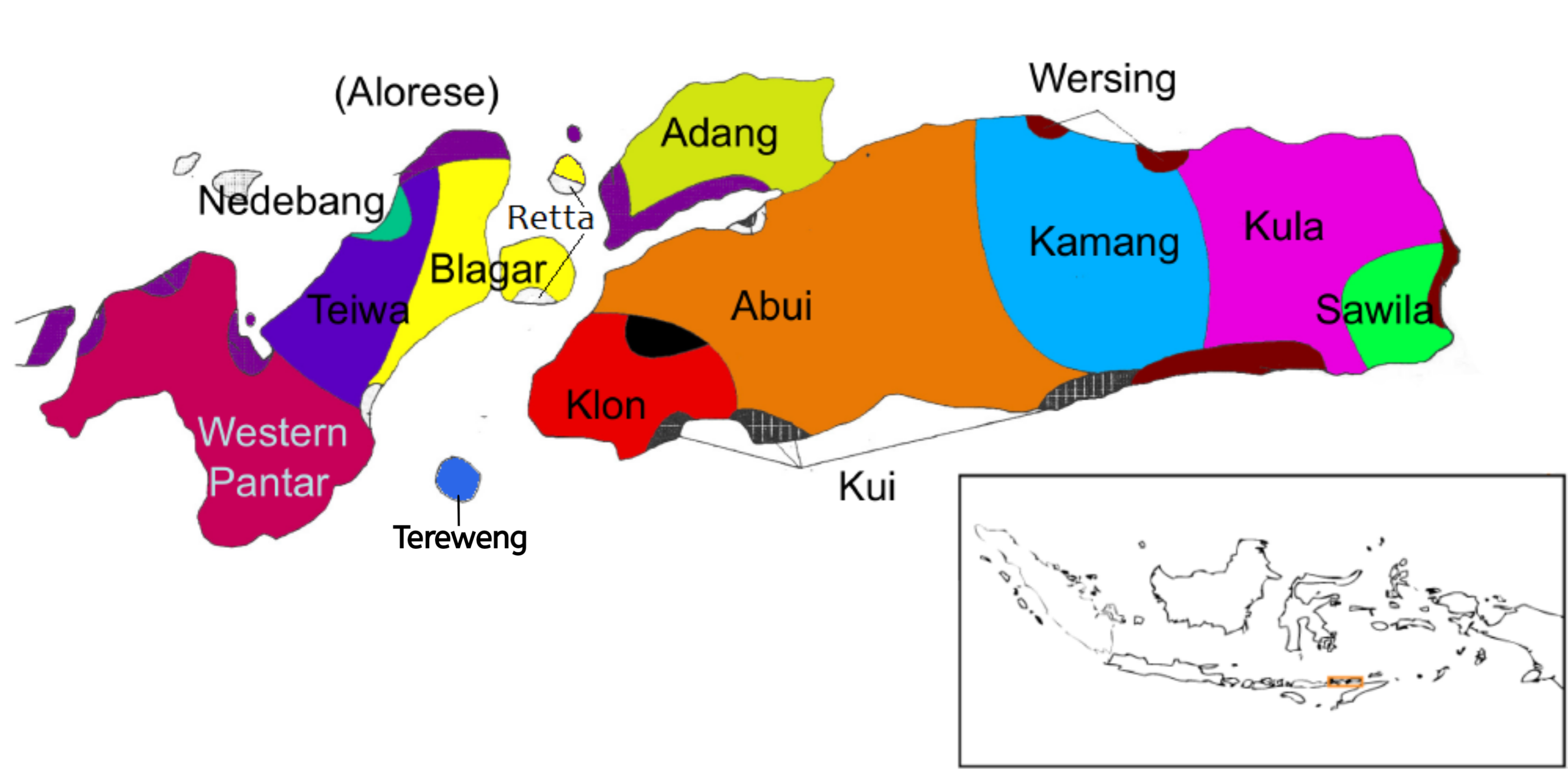
- Languages of the Alor Islands; Blagar is shown in yellow.

Blagar is a Papuan language of Pantar island in the Alor archipelago of Indonesia. The Tereweng dialect spoken on Tereweng Island off the southeast coast of Pantar is sometimes considered a separate language. The Blagar speakers themselves describe their language as pi abaŋ hur (lit. 'our village language').

The increasing prominence of Indonesian and Alor Malay has been putting pressure on the Blagar language although the language is still used by all age groups. By the 1970s, Indonesian and Alor Malay replaced Blagar as the language of churches and mosques, and in the early 2000s the spread of Indonesian and Alor Malay was furthered by the introduction of electricity on Pura Island.

== Phonology ==
=== Vowels ===
Blagar has five vowels, with a sharp contrast between short and long vowels.

	Front	Back
Close	/i/ /i:/	/u/ /u:/
Mid	/e/ /e:/	/o/ /o:/
Open	/a/ /a:/	

=== Consonants ===
	Bilabial	Alveolar	Palatal	Velar	Glottal
Plosive	p b	t̪ d		k g	ʔ
Implosive	ɓ				
Fricative		s z			h
Nasal	m	n		ŋ	
Trill		r			
Lateral		l			
Approximant			j		

== Grammar ==
The morphological typology of Blagar is categorized as isolating.

== Writing system ==
Blagar uses the 26 letters of the ISO basic Latin alphabet, and has two digraphs: ⟨ng⟩ and ⟨sy⟩.

Uppercase letters	A	B	C	D	E	F	G	H	I	J	K	L	M	N	O	P	Q	R	S	T	U	V	W	X	Y	Z
Lowercase letters	a	b	c	d	e	f	g	h	i	j	k	l	m	n	o	p	q	r	s	t	u	v	w	x	y	z
IPA	/a/	/b/	/t͡ʃ/	/d/	/e/	/f/	/g/	/h/	/i/	/d͡ʒ/	/k/	/l/	/m/	/n/	/o/	/p/	/k/, /q/	/r/~/ɾ/	/s/	/t/	/u/	/f/, /v/	/w/	/ks/	/j/	/s/, /z/

Digraphs	ng	sy
IPA	/ŋ/	/ʃ/

⟨c⟩, ⟨q⟩, ⟨x⟩, ⟨z⟩ and ⟨sy⟩ are only used in foreign place names and loanwords.

Another writing system is also used, which is phonemic and is similar to the writing system of Indonesian.

Letters	a	b	b’	d	e	g	h	i	j	k	l	m	n	ng	o	p	q	r	t	u	v	y
IPA	/a/	/b/	/ɓ/	/d/	/e/	/g/	/h/	/i/	/ɟ/, /ɟ͡ʝ/	/k/	/l/	/m/	/n/	/ŋ/	/o/	/p/	/ʔ/	/r/	/t/	/u/	/w/	/j/

== Bibliography ==
- Steinhauer, Hein (1977). ""Going" and "Coming" in the Blagar of Dolap (Pura--Alor--Indonesia) ^{1)}" (PDF). SEAlang.
- Steinhauer, Hein (2010). "Pura when we were younger than today". In Fiedorczuk, Artiem M.; Czlenowa, Swietłana F.; Biełowa, Olga W. (eds.). Studia Anthropologica: A collection of works by Professor M.A. Czlenowa. Moscow and Jerusalem: Mosty kultury/Gieszarim. pp. 261–283. ISBN 978-5-93273-319-5. OCLC 713785869.
- Steinhauer, Hein (2014). "Blagar". In Schapper, Antoinette (ed.). The Papuan Languages of Timor, Alor and Pantar: Volume 1: Sketch Grammars. Walter de Gruyter. pp. 147–219. ISBN 9781614515241.
- Steinhauer, Hein; Gomang, Hendrik D.R. (2016). Kamus Blagar-Indonesia-Inggris: Blagar-Indonesian-English Dictionary. Yayasan Pustaka Obor Indonesia. ISBN 978-602-433-356-0.
