= Alor–Pantar languages =

Papuan languages of Nusa Tenggara Timur, Indonesia

Alor–Pantar
- Geographic distribution: Alor Island, Pantar Island, Indonesia
- Linguistic classification: Trans–New Guinea ?: Berau Gulf ?; West Bomberai?; Timor–Alor–Pantar; Alor–Pantar

Language codes
- Glottolog: alor1249
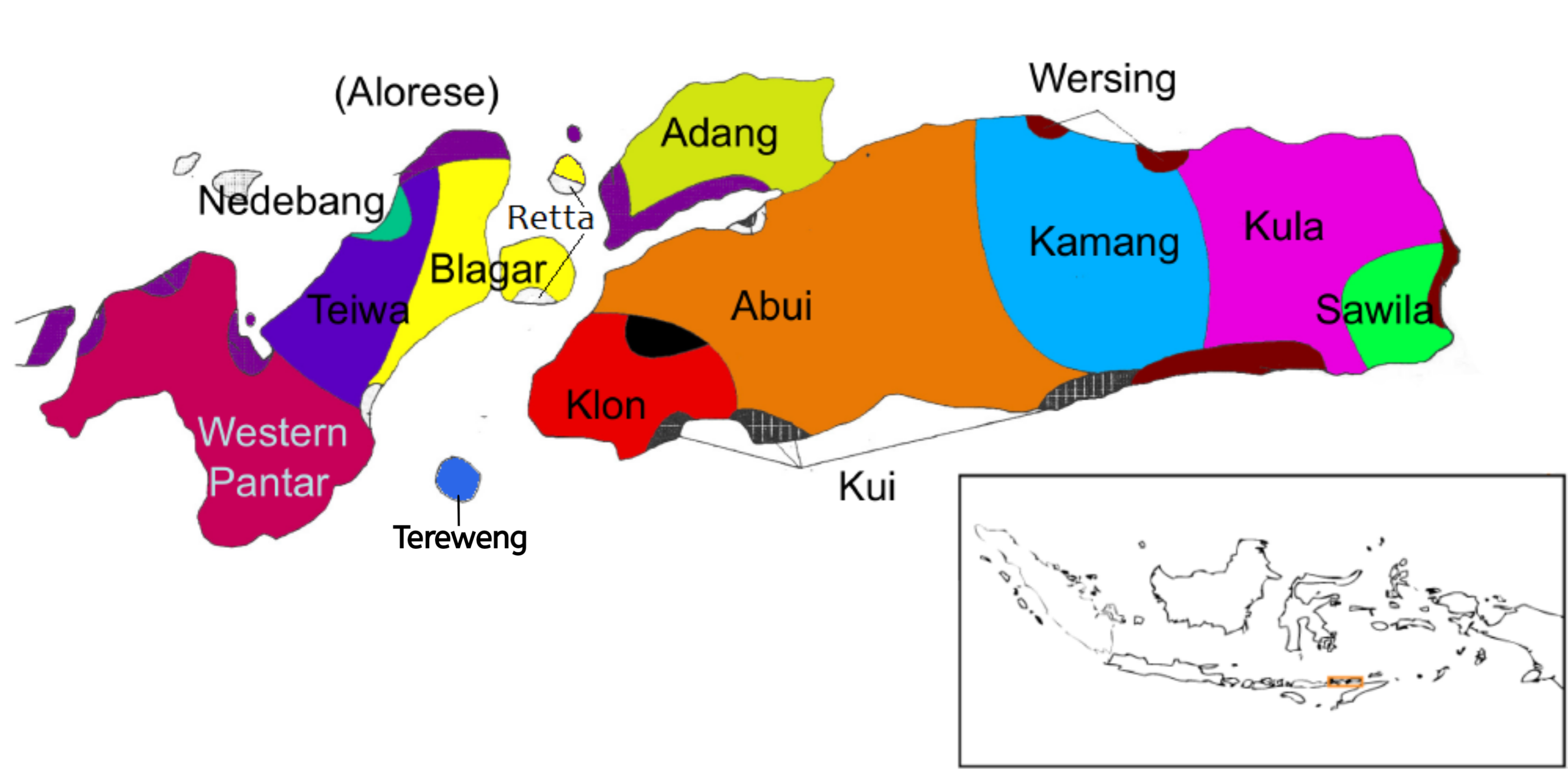
- The languages of Pantar (left) and Alor (right). The white enclaves near Blagar and Retta and Tereweng. "Western Pantar" is Lamma. Kafoa (Jafoo) is the black area between Kelon (Klon) and Abui. Kabola is merged with Adang. Alorese is an Austronesian language.

The Alor–Pantar languages are a family of clearly related Papuan languages spoken on islands of the Alor archipelago near Timor in southern Indonesia. They are most closely related to the Papuan languages of eastern Timor under the Timor–Alor–Pantar grouping. A more distant relationship with the Trans–New Guinea languages of the Bomberai peninsula of Western New Guinea has been proposed based on pronominal evidence, but though often cited has never been firmly established.

== Languages ==
The family is conventionally divided into two branches, centered on the islands of Alor and Pantar.

- Alor branch: Wosika, Abui, Adang–Kabola, Kafoa (Jafoo), Kui, Klon, Wersing, Sawila, Kula
- Pantar branch: Blagar, Teiwa, Tereweng, Kaera, Lamma, Nedebang, Retta

Tereweng is sometimes considered a separate language from Blagar, Hamap sometimes separate from Adang, and Sar sometimes from Teiwa. Abui, Kamang, and Kabola may also not be unitary languages. There is a total of 71,940 speakers.

Distribution of speakers of Alor-Pantar languages by language
1. Abui (20.7%)
2. Adang (14.8%)
3. Blagar (12.2%)
4. Western Pantar (12.2%)
5. Woisika (6.30%)
6. Klon (6.09%)
7. Kula (6.09%)
8. Kui (5.16%)
9. Teiwa (4.87%)
10. Others (11.6%)

== External classification ==
It has long been recognized that the Papuan languages of the Alor archipelago (including Alor and Pantar, as well as the four small islands of Buaya, Pura, Ternate, and Tereweng in the Pantar Strait) form a well-defined group. Apparent cognates among basic vocabulary are abundant, as demonstrated for example in Stokhof’s (1975) survey of basic vocabulary, and the shape of pronominal systems is almost identical across the group. The genetic relatedness of the Alor–Pantar languages has been confirmed through the reconstruction of the proto-Alor–Pantar language. Relationships between the Alor–Pantar languages and at least some (though perhaps not all) of the non-Austronesian languages of Timor Island may justify the positing of a Timor–Alor–Pantar language family, however, the relationship between the AP group and the Timor languages is of second order.

Wurm et al. (1975) classified the AP languages as members of the putative Trans-New Guinea Phylum. However, the authors offered little evidence for this classification and remained somewhat doubtful, noting, “whichever way they [the Timor–Alor–Pantar languages] are classified, they contain strong substratum elements of the other … phyla involved” (Wurm et al. 1975:318).

Most recently, based on an analysis of pronominal shapes Ross (2005) assigns AP to his West Trans-New Guinea linkage, a subgroup of Trans-New Guinea. Yet Ross’ proposal requires that AP pronouns be derived from pTNG via a flip-flop in which second-person pronouns trade places with the third person. Compare pTNG *ŋga ‘2pro’ and *(y)a ‘3pro’ with Nedebang aŋ and gaŋ, respectively. Bottom-up reconstruction based on regular sound correspondences may shed further light on these issues.

== Internal classification ==
=== Holton, et al. (2012) ===
Holton, et al. (2012) propose the following classificatory subgrouping for the Alor–Pantar languages, with individual languages marked by italics.

- Proto-Alor–Pantar
  - Nedebang
  - Kaera
  - Teiwa–Sar
    - Sar
    - Teiwa
  - Western Pantar (Mauta, Tubbe, Lamma)
  - Alor (*k, *q merge)
    - Kui
    - Abui
    - Kamang
    - ?Kafoa (Jafoo)
    - West Alor (*s > /h/)
      - Klon
      - Straits (*k > Ø, *g > /ʔ/)
        - Blagar–Retta
          - Blagar
          - Retta
          - Tereweng
        - Adang
    - East Alor (*b > /p/, *s > /t/)
      - Tanglapui
        - Sawila
        - Kula
      - Wersing (Kolana)

"Proto-Alor–Pantar" may be synonymous with Proto-Timor–Alor–Pantar, as the languages outside the Alor branch do not seem to form a valid node with it against the Oirata–Makasai languages of East Timor and Bunak language on the Timorese border. However, the relationship is distant.

=== Kaiping and Klamer (2019) ===
A 2019 phylogenetic study of Alor–Pantar by Kaiping and Klamer gives the following internal structure:

- Alor–Pantar
  - East Alor
    - Kamang
    - Wersing, Sawila–Kula
  - Nuclear Alor–Pantar
    - Alor
      - Central Alor
        - Klon
        - Abui–Kafoa, Kiriman–Kui
      - West Alor
        - Kabola, Adang–Lawahing
        - Hamap, Adang–Otvai
    - Pantar-Straits
      - Western Pantar
      - Pantar
        - Klamu, Teiwa
        - Kaera, Retta–Blagar

Kaiping and Klamer (2019b) have found that the four major Alor–Pantar subgroups, namely Pantar, Blagar, Central Alor, and East Alor, form different phylogenetic trees depending on the methodology that is applied.

== Pronouns ==
Ross (2005) postulates a "West Timor" group uniting Alor–Pantar with Bunak. He reconstructs the pronouns as:

West Timor pronouns
		singular	plural
1st person	exclusive	*na	*ni
1st person	inclusive	*na	*pi
2nd person		*[y]a	*i
3rd person		*ga	*gi

3PL *gi is not attested from Bunak, and the inclusive is just i.

== Language documentation ==
Language documentation efforts in the early 21st century have produced a range of published documentary materials.

- Grammatical descriptions
  - A Grammar of Adang (Haan 2001)
  - A Grammar of Abui (Kratochvíl 2007)
  - A Grammar of Klon (Baird 2008)
  - A Grammar of Teiwa (Klamer 2010)
- Dictionaries
  - Kamus Pengantar Bahasa Abui (Kratochvíl & Delpada 2008)
  - Kamus Pengantar Bahasa Pantar Barat (Holton & Lamma Koly 2008)

== Proto-language ==
Proto-Alor–Pantar
- Reconstruction of: Alor–Pantar languages
- Reconstructed ancestors: Proto-Trans–New Guinea: Proto-Timor–Alor–Pantar

A reconstruction of proto-Alor–Pantar has been proposed by Holton and Robinson (2017).

Proto-Alor–Pantar consonants are:

p	t		k	q
b	d		g	
m	n			
	s			
w		j		
	l (r)			

In contrast, proto-Timor-Alor-Pantar does not have the voiceless uvular stop /q/.

Lexical reconstructions by Holton and Robinson (2017) are:

proto-Alor–Pantar reconstructions (Holton and Robinson 2017)

gloss	proto-Alor-Pantar
‘bird’	*(a)dVl
‘name’	*en(i,u)
‘thatch’	*aman
‘black’	*aqana
‘vagina’	*-ar
‘two’	*araqu
‘bite’	*-asi
‘crocodile’	*bagai
‘yellow’	*bagori
‘pig’	*baj
‘leg’	*-bat
‘mat’	*bis
‘wave’	*bob
‘betel nut’	*bui
‘guard’	*bukan
‘smoke’	*bunaq
‘sing’	*dar(a)
‘slippery’	*dul(a)
‘thick’	*dumV
‘rat’	*dur
‘burn’	*ede
‘give’	*-ena
‘3sg’	*ga-
‘3gen’	*ge-
‘3pl’	*gi-
‘2sg’	*ha-
‘fish’	*habi
‘village’	*haban
‘fire, firewood’	*hada
‘yawn’	*hagur
‘breast’	*hami
‘excrement’	*has
‘empty’	*hasak
‘lime’	*hawar
‘dream’	*hipar
‘sugarcane’	*huːba
‘fruit’	*is(i)
‘laugh’	*jari
‘bad, broken’	*jasi
‘star’	*jibV
‘dog’	*jibar
‘water’	*jira
‘fly’ (v.)	*jira(n)
‘five’	*jiwesin
‘mosquito’	*kin
‘fingernail’	*kusin
‘flea’	*kVt
‘walk’	*lam(ar)
‘tongue’	*-lebur
‘far’	*lete
‘crouch’	*luk(V)
‘bark’ (v.)	*lVu
‘bat’	*madel
‘hear’	*magi
‘come’	*mai
‘betel vine’	*mait
‘father’	*-mam
‘bamboo’	*mari
‘(be) in/on’	*mi
‘climb’	*mid
‘nose’	*-mim
‘die’	*min(a)
‘sit’	*mis
‘banana’	*mogol
‘body hair’	*mudi
‘plant’ (v.)	*mudin
‘horn’	*-muk
‘rotten’	*mVn
‘1sg’	*na-
‘eat/drink’	*nai
‘sibling (older)’	*nan(a)
‘one’	*nuk
‘throw’	*oda
‘tail’	*-ora
‘dry in sun’	*por
‘hold’	*p{i,u}nV
‘1pl.incl’	*pi-
‘spit’	*purVn
‘scorpion’	*pVr
‘goanna’	*rVsi
‘spear’	*qaba(k)
‘tens’	*qar-
‘new’	*siba
‘shark’	*sib(a,i)r
‘six’	*talam
‘saltwater’	*tam
‘fat’	*tama
‘hand/arm’	*-tan
‘pierce’	*tapai
‘stand’	*tas
‘tree’	*tei
‘bedbug’	*temek
‘ripe’	*tena
‘wake s.o.’	*-ten
‘recline’	*tia
‘expel’	*tiara
‘close’ (v.)	*-tiari(n)
‘stomach’	*-tok
‘short’	*tukV
‘child’	*-uaqal
‘ear’	*-uari
‘tooth’	*uasin
‘knee’	*uku
‘mouth’	*-wa
‘sun’	*wadi
‘blood’	*wai
‘roof’	*wai
‘stone’	*war
‘coconut’	*wata
‘bathe’	*weli
‘moon’	*wur
