= Alorese language =

Austronesian language

Alorese
- Native to: Indonesia
- Region: Alor Archipelago
- Ethnicity: Alorese
- Native speakers: (25,000 cited 1997)
- Language family: Austronesian: Malayo-Polynesian; Central–Eastern; Flores–Lembata; Lamaholot; Alorese–Lamalera; Alorese
- Writing system: Latin

Language codes
- ISO 639-3: aol
- Glottolog: alor1247

Alorese is an Austronesian language spoken by the Alorese people on Alor and the neighboring islands of the Alor Archipelago in eastern Indonesia. It is not to be confused with non-Austronesian (Papuan) languages of the Alor–Pantar family which are also spoken in this region. It is also distinct from Alor Malay, a Malay-based creole variety which is currently supplanting Alorese as the language of wider communication in the region.

Alorese is the native language of several immigrant communities located along the coast of the Alor Archipelago, especially at Alor Kecil and Kalabahi in Alor, and at Baranusa and Marisa in Pantar. It has also been used extensively as a trade language in the region. One of the varieties is Dulolong.

Alorese is closely related to Lamaholot and is often classified as a dialect thereof. Researchers like Klamer (2011), who found that Alorese shares only half its basic vocabulary with Lamaholot, consider Alorese to be distinct enough to be considered its own language.

== Phonology ==
Vowels
	Front	Central	Back
Close	i		u
Open-mid	ɛ		ɔ
Open		a	

Consonants
		Labial	Alveolar	Palatal	Velar	Glottal
Nasal		m	n		ŋ	
Plosive/ Affricate	voiceless	p	t		k	ʔ
Plosive/ Affricate	voiced	b	d	dʒ	ɡ	
Fricative		f	s			h
Rhotic			r			
Approximant		w	l	j		
