= Pantar =

Island in Indonesia

Native name: Pulau Pantar
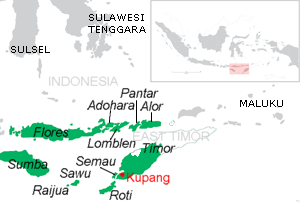
- Map of the islands of East Nusa Tenggara, including Pantar
- Interactive map of Pantar

Geography
- Coordinates: 8°21′29″S 124°04′28″E
- Archipelago: Alor archipelago, Lesser Sunda Islands
- Area: 771.98 km^{2} (298.06 sq mi)

Administration
- Indonesia
- Province: East Nusa Tenggara
- Regency: Alor
- Largest settlement: Baranusa

Demographics
- Population: 45,660 (mid 2025 estimate)
- Pop. density: 58.1/km^{2} (150.5/sq mi)
- Ethnic groups: Alorese and other indigenous people of Pantar

Pantar (Indonesian: Pulau Pantar; Indonesian pronunciation: [ˌpulau̯ ˈpan̪t̪ar]) is the second largest island in the Indonesian Alor Archipelago, after Alor. To the east is the island of Alor and other small islands in the archipelago; to the west is the Alor Strait, which separates it from the Solor Archipelago. To the south is the Ombai Strait, and 72 kilometres (45 mi) away, the island of Timor. To the north is the Banda Sea. Pantar is about 50 kilometres (31 mi) north-to-south, and varies from 11 to 29 kilometres (6.8 to 18.0 mi) in east–west width. It has a land area of 771.98 square kilometres (298.06 sq mi). The main towns on the island are Baranusa (which sits on a small peninsula in the middle of the north coast, projecting into Blangmerang Bay) and Kabir (a small port on the east coast facing Alor Island). Administratively, the island is part of the Alor Regency within East Nusa Tenggara Province.

== Geography ==
The island consists of two distinct geographic zones. The eastern zone is dominated by a range of verdant hills which drop steeply to the coast of the Alor Strait. The western zone is relatively flat, consisting of a plain which gently slopes to the west from Mount Sirung, an 862-metre-high (2,828-foot) active volcano. The western zone is characteristically drier and much less densely populated than the eastern zone. Owing to its relatively low elevation, the entire island is drier than neighboring Alor. The dry season is long, interspersed with heavy rainfall during the rainy season, which peaks during January and February.

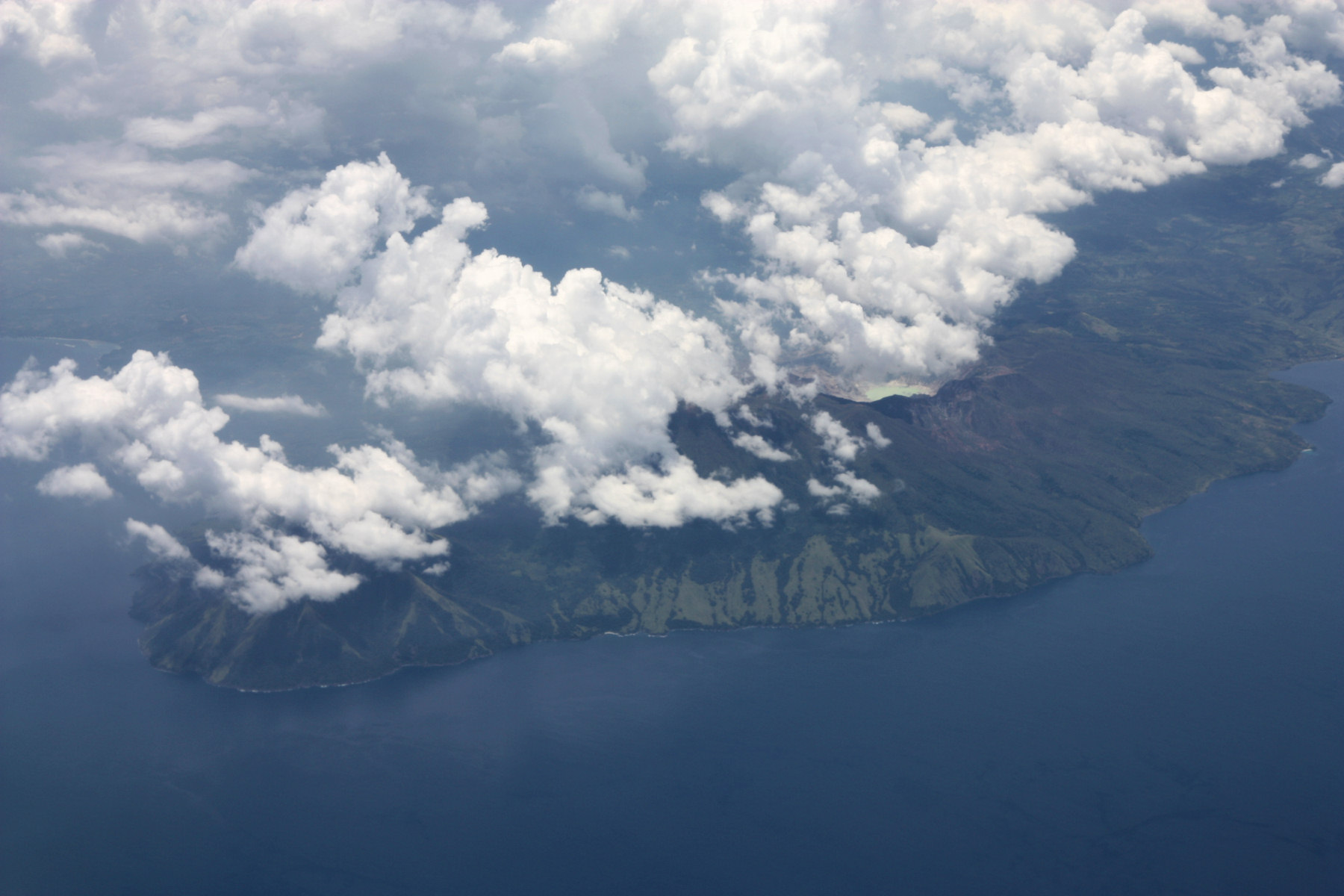
Aerial view of Mount Sirung

== History ==
The earliest written reference to Pantar is in the fourteenth-century Javanese poem Nagarakretagama, which describes the power and extent of the empire ruled by the fourth king of Majapahit, Hayam Wuruk. Pantar is referred to with the term 'Galiao', which is known in the Alor archipelago. The precise location of the Majapahit dependency within Pantar is a subject of discussion.

== Economy ==
The economy is dominated by subsistence agriculture and fishing. The most common crops are rice, corn, and cassava. Crops are harvested annually in April and stored for consumption throughout the dry season. Excess production is sometimes traded for fish or to help support school children studying in the district capital of Kalabahi. Recently, commercial production of seaweed has been promoted along the north coast. A limited craft industry focused on ikat weaving is centered in Baranusa. Tourism remains underdeveloped, though a small dive resort was recently established on the northeast coast.

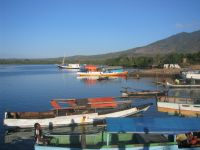
Baranusa harbor, Pantar

== Transportation ==
Until 2021, access to the island was by water only. Pantar Airport was opened in March 2021, near the village of Kabir. It has a single paved runway 2,950ft in length. Small wooden power boats ply the route between Alor and Pantar daily, serving numerous communities. The state-run ferry serves Baranusa weekly between Kalabahi (Alor) and Larantuka (Flores).

== Administrative districts ==
The island comprises five districts (kecamatan) of Alor Regency, tabulated below with their areas and their populations at the 2010 census and the 2020 census, together with the official estimates as at mid 2025. The table also includes the locations of the district administrative centres, the number of villages (rural desa and urban kelurahan) in each district, and its post code. Eight small offshore islands are included within these districts.

Kode Wilayah	Name of District (kecamatan)	English name	Area in km^{2}	Pop'n census 2010	Pop'n census 2020	Pop'n estimate mid 2025	Admin centre	No. of villages	Post codes
53.05.06	Pantar ^{(a)}		126.64	8,798	10,069	10,989	Kabir	11 ^{(b)}	85881
63.05.09	Pantar Barat ^{(c)}	West Pantar	71.38	6,729	6,878	7,107	Baranusa	7	85880
53.05.14	Pantar Timur ^{(d)}	East Pantar	161.32	10,740	11,368	11,946	Bakalang	11	85884
53.05.17	Pantar Barat Laut ^{(e)}	Northwest Pantar	145.68	4,276	4,946	5,426	Marisa	7	85882
53.05.16	Pantar Tengah	Central Pantar	266.96	9,313	9,750	10,192	Maliang	10	85883
	Pantar	Total Pantar Island	771.98	39,856	43,011	45,660		46	

Notes: (a) includes just the northern part of Pantar Island. (b) includes the kelurahan of Kabir. (c) includes offshore islands of Pulau Kura and uninhabited Pulau Batang and Pulau Lapang.
(d) includes offshore Pulau Treweng. (e) includes offshore islands of Pulau Kangge and uninhabited Pulau Kambing, Pulau Rusa and Pulau Tikus.

== Languages ==
At least eight different languages are spoken on Pantar. These include at least five (dependent on classification) Papuan languages belonging to the Alor–Pantar family (Western Pantar, Sar, Blagar, Nedebang, and Kaera) as well as the Austronesian language Alorese. A small community of Bajau speakers is located north of Kabir. Local varieties of Malay (Alor Malay) and more standardized Indonesian are used as languages of wider communication.

== See also ==
- List of islands of Indonesia
