= Alor Malay =

East Indonesian Malay Creole language

- Melayu Alor
- Native to: Indonesia
- Region: Alor Archipelago
- Ethnicity: Alorese and other indigenous people of Alor
- Native speakers: L1: 8,000; L2: 200,000
- Language family: Malay Creole: East Indonesia; Kupang Malay; Alor Malay

Language codes
- ISO 639-3: –
- Glottolog: alor1252

Alor Malay is a Malay-based creole language spoken in the Alor Archipelago of Indonesia. Speakers perceive Alor Malay to be a different register of standard Indonesian, but both of these are prestige varieties of the archipelago. Many people are able to understand standard Indonesian, but cannot speak it fluently and choose to use Alor Malay on a daily basis.

Alor Malay is based on Kupang Malay; however, Alor Malay differs significantly from Kupang Malay, especially in its pronouns. Before Alor Malay became lingua franca, Alorese language served as a lingua franca in the Alor-Pantar archipelago before Malay began to be widely used.

== Morphology ==
Alor Malay is an isolating language. Verbs are not morphologically marked for tense or aspect. The only productive nominal morphology is full reduplication. Nominal reduplication indicates plurality, collectivity, and diversity. Full reduplication of the verb can express intensity, iterativity, and casualness, among other concepts.

Nominal reduplication

ana~ana dong
child~child PL
'children'

daun~daun
leaf~leaf
'all sorts of leaves'

Verbal reduplication

Wa ada bergerak~bergerak la!
EXCL PROG move~move EMPH
'Wa...he keeps on moving!'

Dia ada sengaja foto~foto orang tu.
3SG PROG deliberately take.photo~take.photo person DEM
'He is deliberately taking many photos of them over and over again.'

== Syntax ==
The typical word order in Alor Malay is Agent Verb Patient. Alor Malay uses serial verb constructions such as bawa datang ‘bring (lit. bring come)’ and kasi jatu ‘drop (lit. give fall)’. There are also temporal and aspectual adverbs. The verbal negation marker precedes the verb, as in dia tida omong ‘he does not speak’. Possessed items are preceded by their possessors. Demonstratives typically precede their nouns.

Possession

George pung bahu
George POSS shoulder
'George's shoulder'

dia pung tangan
3.AGT POSS hand
'her hands'

Negation

Saya tida punya apa~apa untuk kamu.
1SG NEG have what~what for 2PL
'I don’t have anything for you (pl.).'

Laki-laki satu jalan datang ni-yang dia tidak lihat pisang.
man one walk come DEM-REL 3SG NEG visually.perceive banana
'As a man passes along, he does not see the banana.'

Serial Verb Construction

Simon kasi bangun Ata ko duduk.
Simon give get.up Ata LK sit
'Simon lifts Ata up and then sits.'
