= Timor–Alor–Pantar languages =

Language family of Maritime Southeast Asia

Timor–Alor–Pantar
- Geographic distribution: Indonesia, East Timor (Timor and neighboring islands)
- Linguistic classification: Trans–New Guinea or one of the world's primary language families: Berau Gulf; West Bomberai; Timor–Alor–Pantar
- Subdivisions: Alor–Pantar; East Timor; Bunak

Language codes
- Glottolog: timo1261

The Timor–Alor–Pantar (TAP) languages are a family of languages spoken in Timor, Kisar, and the Alor archipelago in Southern Indonesia. It is the westernmost Papuan language family that survives (see Tambora), and one of two such outlier families in east Nusantara (the other being the North Halmahera family).

The first classification attempts linked Timor–Alor–Pantar to North Halmahera, as well as other members of the proposed West Papuan phylum. The two families are arguably the only linguistic groups that can be linked to the Papuan families of Melanesia, none of which have demonstrable relatives outside of Oceania. More recent proposals have considered Timor–Alor–Pantar to be part of the Trans–New Guinea phylum. However, Holton and Klamer (2018) classify Timor–Alor–Pantar as an independent language family, as they did not find convincing links with Trans–New Guinea. Usher & Schapper (2022) find them to be one of three branches of the West Bomberai family within Trans–New Guinea, with regular sound correspondences.

== Languages ==
The languages are demonstrably related, with the Alor–Pantar languages forming a distinct subgroup. The following conservative classification is from Ross (2005), Schapper et al. (2012), and Holton et al. (2012).

- Alor–Pantar family
- East Timor (Oirata–Makasai) family
- Bunak

The list given above is conservative, without any undemonstrated groups.

Bunak and the Alor–Pantar languages are sometimes grouped together as "West Timor", while Bunak and East Timor have been grouped as "Timor–Kisar". Although the Alor–Pantar languages are clearly related, as are the Timor–Kisar languages and the two groups to each other, until comparative work is done on all languages simultaneously it will not be clear whether Bunak is closer to East Timor or to Alor–Pantar, or whether Alor–Pantar is a valid node. Kaiping and Klamer (2019), though, found Bunak to be the most divergent Timor-Alor-Pantar language, splitting off before East Timor and Alor-Pantar did.

Languages in Central and East Alor are generally more agglutinative than languages in Pantar and Timor, which are more isolating.

== Classification history ==
Despite their geographic proximity, the Papuan languages of Timor are not closely related, and demonstration of a relationship between any of them is difficult, apart from the clearly related Alor–Pantar languages on the islands neighboring Timor.

Arthur Capell first proposed that the Timor languages were a family in 1941, and Watuseke & Anceaux did the same for Timor–Alor–Pantar in 1973. Both units have been broken up in more recent classifications, though their ultimate relationship is generally accepted.

In 1957 HKL Cowan linked the Timor languages to the West Papuan family. However, when Stephen Wurm expanded Trans–New Guinea in 1975, he decided Timor–Alor–Pantar belonged there, and he linked it to the South Bird's Head languages in a South Bird's Head – Timor–Alor–Pantar branch of that phylum. Wurm noted similarities with West Papuan, a different family, but suggested this was due to substratum influence.

Ross (2005) classifies Timor–Alor–Pantar with the West Bomberai languages, the two groups forming a branch within West Trans–New Guinea. Based on a careful examination of new lexical data, Holton & Robinson (2014) find little evidence to support a connection between TAP and TNG. However, Holton & Robinson (2017) concedes that a relationship with Trans-New Guinea and West Bomberai in particular is the most likely hypothesis, though they prefer to leave it unclassified for now.

Usher (2020) finds that the Timor–Alor–Pantar fit within the West Bomberai languages, as a third branch of that family, and has begun to reconstruct the West Bomberai protolanguage as the ancestor of Timor–Alor–Pantar, as well as proto–Timor–Alor–Pantar itself.

According to Dryer (2022), based on a preliminary quantitative analysis of data from the ASJP database, Timor–Alor–Pantar is likely to be a subgroup of Trans–New Guinea.

== Language contact ==
The Timor–Alor–Pantar languages have been in considerable contact with these Austronesian languages:

- Kawaimina languages (Kairui, Waima’a, Midiki, Naueti)
- Kisar–Luangic languages (Kisar / Meher, Leti, Luang, possibly also Makuva)

== Proto-language ==
Proto-Timor–Alor–Pantar
- Reconstruction of: Timor–Alor–Pantar languages
- Reconstructed ancestor: Proto-Trans–New Guinea
- Lower-order reconstructions: Proto-Alor–Pantar

=== Phonology ===
Holton & Klamer (2018) reconstruct the Proto–Timor–Alor–Pantar consonant inventory as follows:

p	t		k	
b	d		g	
m	n			
f	s			h
w		j		
	l, r, ʀ			

Proto–Alor–Pantar developed a voiceless uvular stop *q but lost *f and some of the liquids.

Usher (2020) reconstructs a somewhat different inventory:

p	t	ts	k	kʷ
b	d	dz	g	gʷ
m	n			
	s			
w		j		
	l, r			

*l and *r do not occur initially in native words.

Usher reconstructs the vowels as *i *u [*e] [*o] *a *ɒ (where it's not clear that *e, *o were phonemically distinct) and the diphthong *ai.

Heston reconstructs the vowels *a, *e, *i, *o, *u, and *ə.

Heston also proposes that Proto–Timor–Alor–Pantar had penultimate stress when the penultimate and final syllables were both light, and final stress when the final syllable was heavy.

=== Pronouns ===
Proto-Timor–Alor–Pantar pronouns as reconstructed by Ross (2005) are:

	sg	pl
1excl	*ani~na	*ini
1incl	*ani~na	*api
2	*ai	*i
3	*ga	(*gi)

Usher (2020) reconstructs the free and bound forms of the pronouns as:

	sg	pl
1excl	*an, *na-	*in, *ni-
1incl	*an, *na-	*ap, *?
2	*a, *a-	*i, *i-
3	*ga, *ga-	*gi, *gi-

These have regular paradigms, with suffixes *-i and *-u on the bound forms, so for example 1sg is free *an, direct object and inalienable possessor *na-, locative, ergative and alienable possessor *nai, and dative *nau.

Ross (2005) suggest these pronouns reflect proto-Trans–New Guinea 1st person *na, *ni and 2nd person *ga, *gi, and possibly the pTNG dual/inclusive *-pi-. The objection has been raised that this requires positing a "flip-flop" in which proto-TNG second-person pronouns correspond to proto-TAP third-person pronouns. Usher however establishes that proto–West Bomberai initial *k was lost from proto–Timor–Alor–Pantar (for example, proto-WB *kina 'eye', *kira 'water' and *kena[t] 'see' correspond to proto-TAP *ina, *ira and *ena), and that the proto–West Bomberai pronouns 2sg *ka and 2pl *ki, inherited from proto–Trans–New Guinea, correspond regularly to proto–Timor–Alor–Pantar *a and *i, while the proto–Timor–Alor–Pantar third-person pronouns *ga and *gi do not correspond to the rest of West Bomberai (or Trans–New Guinea) and are only coincidentally similar to the reconstructed proto-TNG second-person pronouns.

=== Schapper et al. (2017) ===
Schapper et al. (2017: 141–143) reconstruct the following proto-Timor-Alor-Pantar, proto-Alor-Pantar, and proto-Timor forms, demonstrating the relatedness of the Timor and Alor-Pantar languages.

Proto-Timor-Alor-Pantar reconstructions (Schapper et al. 2017)
gloss	proto-Timor-Alor-Pantar	proto-Alor-Pantar	proto-Timor
bamboo	*mari	*mari	*mari
banana	*mugul	*mogol	*mugu
bark, call		*lVu	*le(k)u(l)
bat	*madel	*madel	*maTa
bathe	*weLi	*weli	*weru
bird	*(h)adul	*(a)dVl	*haDa
bite	*ki(l)	*(ta)ki	*(ga)gel
blood	*waj	*wai	*waj
bone	*se(r, R)	*ser	*(se)sa(r, R)
breast	*hami	*hami	*hami
child	*-uaQal	*-uaqal	*-al
clew	*ma(i)ta(r)	*maita	*matar
coconut	*wata	*wata	*wa(t, D)a
crawl	*er	*er	*er
crouch	*luk(V)	*luk(V)	*luk
die	*mV(n)	*min(a)	*-umV
dirty	*karV(k)	*karok	*gari
dream	*(h)ipar	*hipar	*ufar(ana)
ear	*-waRi	*-uari	*-wali
eat	*nVa	*nai	*nua
excrement	*(h)at(V)	*has	*a(t, D)u
face	*panu	*-pona	*-fanu
far	*le(t, d)e	*lete	*eTar
fire	*hada	*hada	*haTa
fish	*habi	*habi	*hapi
flat	*tatok	*tatok	*tetok
garden	*magad	*magad(a)	*(u, a)mar
girl	*pan(a)	*pon	*fana
give	*-(e, i)na	*-ena	*-inV
grandparent	*(t, d)ama	*tam(a, u)	*moTo
green	*lugar	*(wa)logar	*ugar
hand	*-tan(a)	*-tan	*-tana
hear	*mage(n)	*magi	*mage(n)
inside	*mi	*mi	*mi
itchy	*iRak	*(i)ruk	*ilag
laugh	*jagir	*jagir	*jiger
leg	*buta	*-bat	*buta
low	*po	*po	*ufe
mat	*bit	*bis	*biti
meat	*isor	*iser	*seor
moon	*hur(u)	*wur	*huru
mountain	*buku	*buku	*bugu
name		*-en(i, u)	*-nej
new	*(t, s)iba(r)	*siba(r)	*(t, s)ipa(r)
new place	*lan	*lan	*lan
nose	*-mVN	*-mim	*-muni
one	*nukV	*nuk	*uneki
other	*abe(nVC)	*aben(VC)	*epi
Pterocarpus indicus	*matar	*matar	*ma(t, D)ar
path	*jega	*jega	*jiga
person	*anV(N)	*anin	*anu
pig	*baj	*baj	*baj
pound	*tapa(i)	*tapai	*tafa
price	*boL	*bol	*bura
rain	*anu(r, R)	*anur	*ine(r, R)
rat	*dur(a)	*dur	*Dura
ripe	*tena	*tena	*tena
run	*tipar	*tiara	*tifar
scorpion	*pV(r, R)	*pVr	*fe(r, R)e
scratch	*karab	*karab	*gabar
sea	*tam(a)	*tam	*mata
shark	*sibar	*sib(a, i)r	*supor
sit	*mit	*mis	*mit
six	*talam	*talam	*tamal
sleep	*tia(r)	*tia	*tia(r)
spit	*puRV(n)	*purVn	*fulu(k, n)
spoon	*suRa	*surV	*sula
stand	*nat(er)	*nate(r)	*nat
star	*jibV	*jibV	*ipi(-bere)
stone	*war	*war	*war
sugarcane	*ub(a)	*huːba	*upa
sun	*wad(i, u)	*wadi	*waTu
taboo	*palu(l, n)	*palol	*falu(n)
tail	*-oRa	*-ora	*-ula(ʔ)
tongue	*-lebuR	*-lebur	*-ipul
tooth	*-wasin	*-uasin	*-wasin
tree	*hate	*tei	*hate
vagina	*-ar(u)	*-ar	*-aru
wake	*tan(i)	*-ten	*Tani
walk (1)	*lak(Vr)	*laka	*lagar
walk (2)	*lamV	*lam(ar)	*male
water	*jira	*jira	*ira
weave	*sine(N)	*sine(N)	*sina
yellow	*bagur(V)	*bagori	*gabar
1pi	*pi	*pi-	*fi
1sg	*na-	*na-	*n-
3	*gie	*ge	*gie
3poss	*ga-	*ga-	*g-

=== Usher (2020) ===
Some lexical reconstructions by Usher (2020) are:

gloss	Proto-Timor-Alor	Bunaq	Proto-East Timor	Proto-Alor-Pantar	Proto-Alor-Pantar (Schapper et al.)
head/hair			*dzage		
hair of head			*dagu		
ear	*ˈwali[k]	hol	*wali[k]	*wari	*-waRi
eye	*ina		*ina	*ina	–
nose	*muni[k]		*muni[k]	*muni	–
tooth	*ˈwasin	-we	*wasin	*wasin	*-wasin
tongue		-up	*ibul	*lebur	*-lebuR
foot/leg	*iˈdi	-iri	*idi		–
blood	*waⁱ[s]	ho	*waⁱ[s]	*waⁱ	*waj
bone			*s[a/o]p[a/o]		
peel/skin	*pasu		*pasu	*pasu	–
breast	*ami	-omoʔ	*ami	*ami	*hami
louse	*amin		*amin	*amin	–
dog	*ˈj[a]bar	zap	*[dz/j]ebar	*jabar	*dibar
bird	*ˈadz[o]l	hos	*adza	*adol	*(h)adul
egg	*ˈudu	-ut	*udu		[*uTa]
tree	*at[eⁱ]		*ate	*at[eⁱ]	*hate
man/male	*nami		*nami		–
woman	*tubur		*tubur		–
sun	*ˈwadu	hot	*wadu	*wadu	*wad(i,u)
water	*ˈira	il	*ira	*ira	*jira
fire	*aˈda	hoto	*ada	*ada	*ada
stone	*war	hol	*war	*w[o]r	*war
path	*ˈ[ja]gal	hik	*iga[r]	*jagal	*jega
name	*naⁱ	-ni	*naⁱ	*naⁱ	[*nei]
eat/drink	*nawa		*nawa	*naː	*nVa
one	*uˈkani	uen	*ukani		–
two			*age		

=== Evolution ===
Pawley and Hammarström (2018) list the following probable reflexes of Proto-Timor-Alor-Pantar (pTAP) and proto-Alor-Pantar (pAP; reconstructions drawn from Holton and Klamer 2018) from proto-Trans-New Guinea (pTNG; reconstructions from Pawley and Hammarström 2018).

Key
pTNG = proto-Trans New Guinea, pTAP = proto-Timor-Alor-Pantar, pAP = proto-Alor-Pantar

- pTNG *am(i,u) ‘breast’ > pTAP *hami ‘breast’
- pTNG *na ‘eat’ > pTAP *nVa ‘eat, drink’
- pTNG *ata ‘excrement’ > pTAP *(h)at(V) ‘excrement’
- pTNG *kumV- ‘die’ > pTAP *mV(n), pAP *min(a) ‘die’, pTimor *-mV ‘die’
- pTNG *inda ‘tree, wood’ > pTAP *hate ‘fire, wood’
- pTNG *panV > pTAP *pan(a) ‘girl’
- pTNG *nan(a,i) ‘older sibling’ > pAP *nan(a) ‘older sibling’
- pTNG *me ‘come’ > pAP *mai ‘come’
- pTNG *mundu ‘nose’ > pTAP *mVN ‘nose’
- pTNG *tukumba[C] ‘short’ > pAP *tukV ‘short’
- pTNG *ŋgatata ‘dry’ > pAP *takata
- pTNG *(m,mb)elak ‘lightning’ > Blagar merax, Retta melak ‘lightning’

However, Holton and Robinson (2014) classify Timor-Alor-Pantar as an independent language family, rather than as part of Trans-New Guinea.
