= Alor Archipelago =

Archipelago at eastern Lesser Sunda Islands

Coordinates: 8.25°S 124.75°E

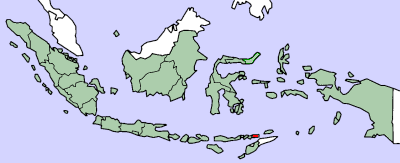
Location of the Alor Archipelago (red) in Indonesia (green).

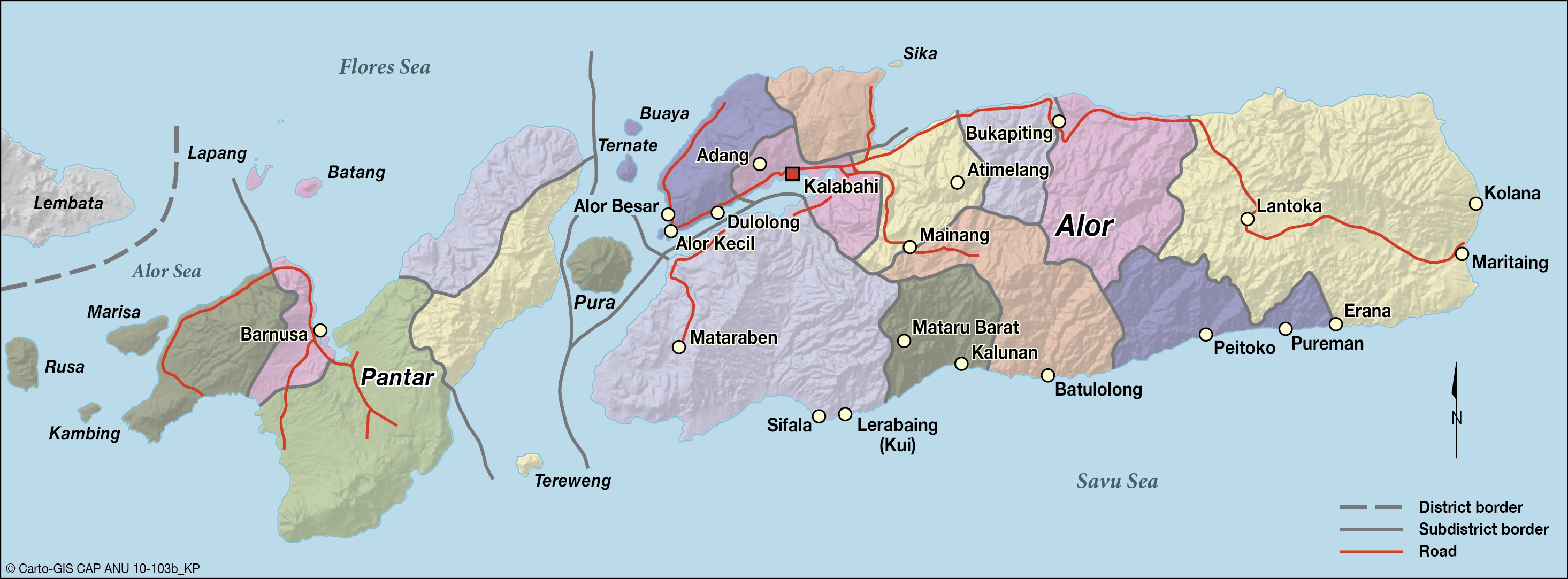
Administrative divisions at the district (kecamatan) level in the Alor Archipelago.

The Alor Archipelago (Indonesian: Kepulauan Alor; Indonesian pronunciation: [kəpuˌlawan ˈalɔr]) is part of Indonesia and is located in the eastern part of Lesser Sunda Islands. The indigenous people of the Alor Archipelago are a collection of ethnic groups with dominant Papuan gene descent of up to 90% with a 10% Austronesian mixture. The native languages of Alor are a Papuan languages from the Alor–Pantar branch, with the only native Austronesian language of Alor being Alorese.

Alor is the largest island in the archipelago which is located at its eastern end. Pantar is the second-largest island in the archipelago, situated between Alor and Lembata. Smaller islands in the group include Pura, Buaya, Ternate (not to be confused with Ternate in the North Moluccas), and Tereweng, all situated in the Pantar Strait between the two main islands, and Kangge, Rusa, and Kambing off the west coast of Pantar in the Alor Strait, and a small island north of Alor, Sika. Administratively, the Alor archipelago forms its own regency (Indonesian: kabupaten) within the province of East Nusa Tenggara. The Regency is divided into seventeen districts and 158 villages, and has an area of 2,928.88 km^{2} and a population at the 2020 Census of 211,872; the official estimate as at mid 2022 was 216,626.

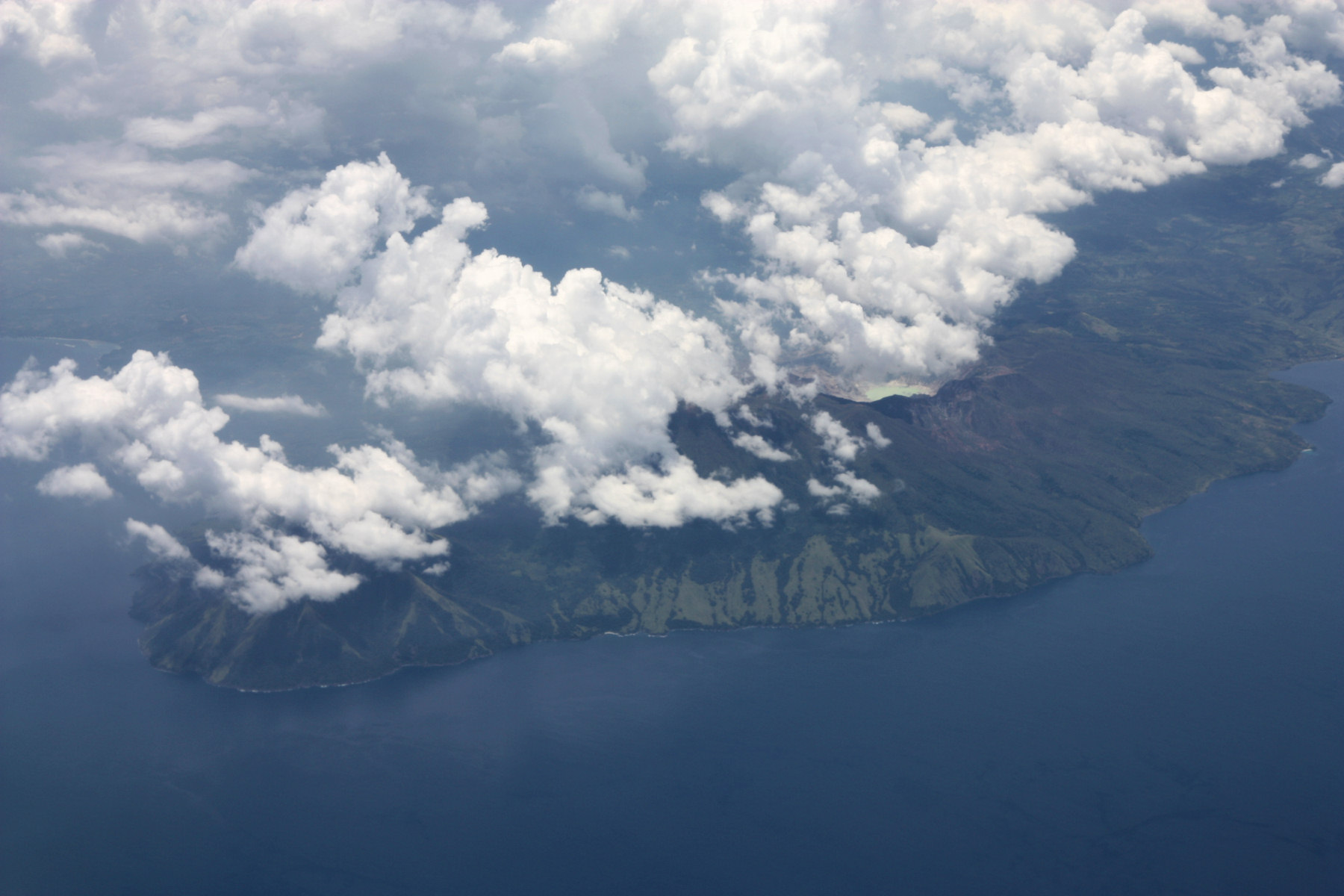
Pantar, one of the islands.

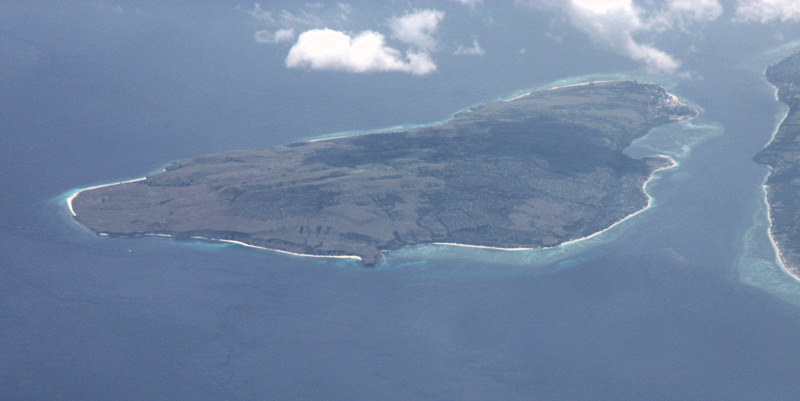
Kangge, one of the smallest islands in the archipelago.

To the east of the archipelago is the Ombai Strait, which separates it from the islands of Wetar and Atauro, the latter belonging to East Timor. To the south, across the Savu Sea, lies the western part of Timor. To the north lies the Banda Sea. To the west lies Lembata and then the rest of the Sunda Islands.
