= West Bomberai languages =

Family of Papuan languages

(Greater) West Bomberai
- Bomberai–Timor
- Geographic distribution: West New Guinea, East Timor
- Linguistic classification: Trans–New Guinea: Berau Gulf; (Greater) West Bomberai
- Subdivisions: Kalamang; Mbaham–Iha; Timor–Alor–Pantar

Language codes
- Glottolog: west2604 (mainland West Bomberai) timo1261 (Timor–Alor–Pantar)
- Map: The West Bomberai languages of New Guinea The West Bomberai languages Other Trans–New Guinea languages Other Papuan languages Austronesian languages Uninhabited

The (Greater) West Bomberai languages are a family of Papuan languages spoken on the Bomberai Peninsula of western New Guinea and in East Timor and neighboring islands of Indonesia.

== Languages ==
Of the three languages on the mainland, Baham and Iha are closely related to each other while the third is distant, forming a third branch of the family along with the Timor–Alor–Pantar languages:

- Mbaham–Iha: Baham (Mbaham), Iha
- Kalamang (Karas)
- Timor–Alor–Pantar

This split, with two of the three branches on the mainland, suggests that Timor–Alor–Pantar may be the result of a relatively recent migration from New Guinea, perhaps arriving in the Timor area shortly before the Austronesian languages did, as Austronesian influence post-dates Proto–West Bomberai and even Proto-Timor–Alor–Pantar.

== History of classification ==
Wurm, Voorhoeve & McElhanon included Timor–Alor–Pantar and mainland West Bomberai as separate stocks within Trans–New Guinea. Ross grouped them together to form a branch of his proposed West Trans–New Guinea stock, though with mainland West Bomberai as an additional branch within Timor–Alor–Pantar. Holton & Robinson (2014) found little evidence to support a connection of Timor–Alor–Pantar with Trans–New Guinea, but Holton & Robinson (2017) conceded that a relationship with Trans-New Guinea, and in particular with West Bomberai, was the most likely hypothesis. Usher & Schapper (2022) established that the two mainland branches of the family are no closer to each other than they are to the Timor–Alor–Pantar languages – indeed that Kalamang might be the most divergent, and Usher has begun to reconstruct the West Bomberai protolanguage.

== Phonemes ==
Usher & Schapper (2022) reconstruct the following inventory of consonants:

*p	*t		*k	*kʷ
*mb	*nd	(*ndz)	*ŋɡ	(*ŋɡʷ)
*m	*n			
	*s			
*w	*l, *r	(*j)		

Word-initial *k and *kʷ become *ʔ and *w in TAP. *kʷ becomes /k/ and intervocalic *p *t *k become /w, r, zero/ in Kalamang.

Prenasalized plosives did not occur initially in Proto-West Bomberai, having merged with the voiceless plosives. Medially, *mb *nd *ŋɡ become voiced stops in TAP; this is an areal feature, with proto-Austronesian *mb *nd *ŋɡ having done the same in neighboring Austronesian languages.

The vowels are still uncertain, but are likely to have been a simple *a *e *i *o *u system and appear to have included a diphthong *ai.

== Pronouns ==
Usher & Schapper (2022) reconstruct the free pronouns as:

	sg	pl
1excl	*an ~ *na-	*in ~ *ni-
1incl	*an ~ *na-	*pi
2	*ka	*ki

The correspondences are mostly straightforward; initial *k has been lost from Timor–Alor–Pantar.

== Cognates ==
Protoforms of the 40 most-stable items in the Swadesh list include the following.

Proto-West Bomberai	gloss
*am[i/u]n	louse
*kira	water
*kʷali	ear
*kVmV	die
*kina	eye
*tana	hand/arm
*nai	name
*war	stone
*ami	breast
*jaŋgal	path
?	tongue (*maŋg voice/speech)
*aŋgin	body/skin
*kaja	rain
*waik	blood
*ukʷan[i]	one
*ma	come
*tumbər	mountain
*nawa	eat/drink
*kəna	see
*kʷel[e]	skin/bark
*jambar	dog
