= Moko drums =

Type of bronze drum from Indonesia

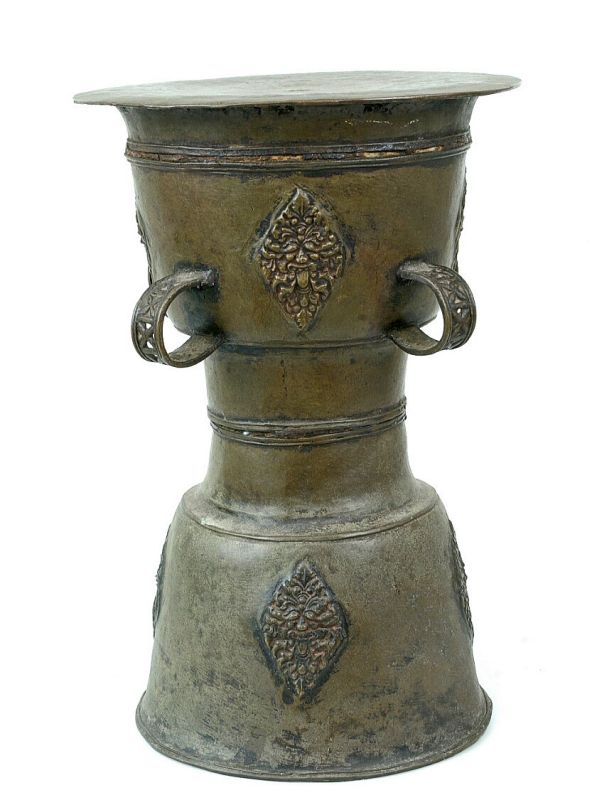
A moko

Moko are bronze kettledrums from Alor Island, Indonesia. While they have been found in several different locations in Indonesia, they are most famously associated with the island of Alor, where they have long been prized in ceremonial exchanges. Later moko were made in China and Java and were brought to Alor in the 19th century.

Some scholars identify the design and decorations have their likely origin in Đông Sơn the centre of the Đông Sơn culture in Vietnam. However, it remains a mystery as to how the older Đông Sơn drums arrived in Alor. Local origin stories describe the discovery of mokos buried in the ground, and it is still common to hear of moko being uncovered in this way. In The People of Alor, American anthropologist Cora Du Bois describes people burying mokos in hidden locations to avoid surrendering them to creditors or lending them to relatives.

Moko remain important symbols of status and are particularly important is their ritual value. Moko are still generally required as part of the bridal dowry, though the short supply of moko today means that moko must often be borrowed or mortgaged for this purpose.

In March 2024, Shiyue Wu and Francesco Perono Cacciafoco published a systematic list of Moko drums and bronze gongs from Alor, with the versions and variants of their names in the Abui (Central Alor), Kula (Eastern Alor), and Sawila (Eastern Alor) languages.

== See also ==
- Đông Sơn drums
- Pejeng drum
