= Taiganja =

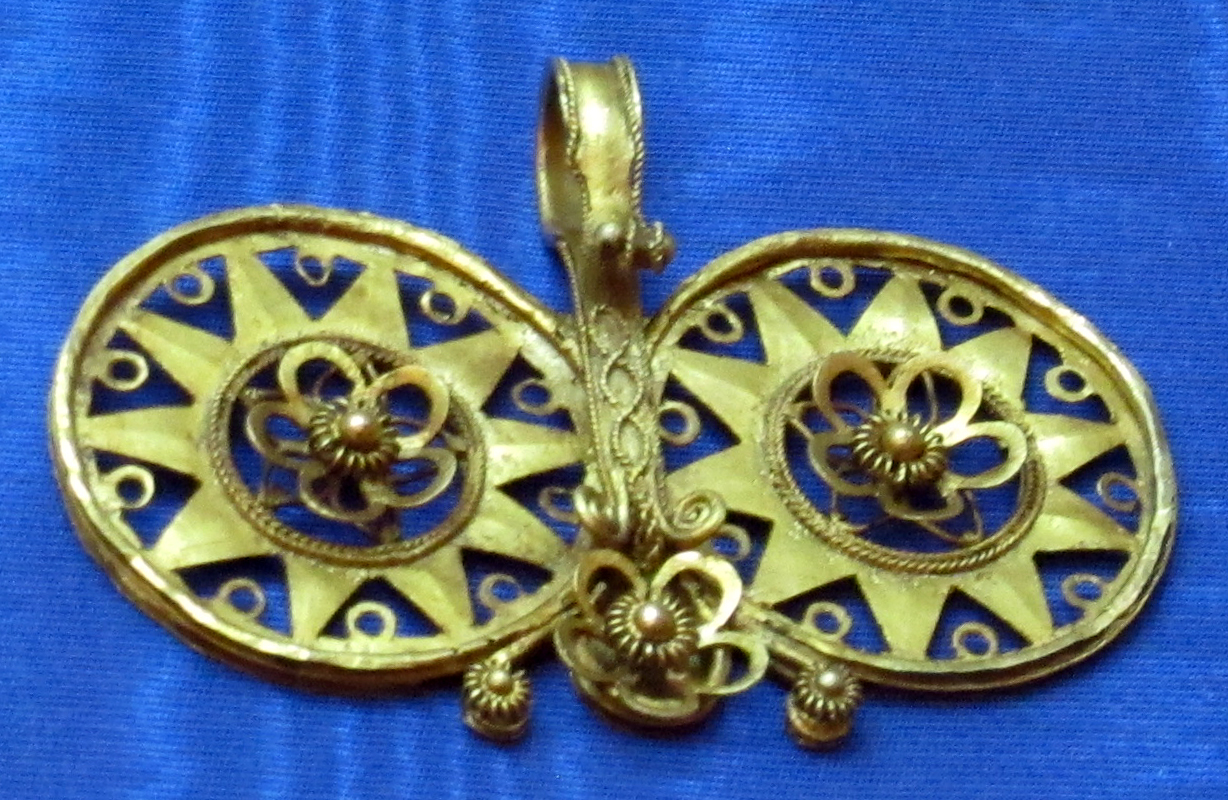
This example of taiganja is unusual with its wheel-like form and lack of the core "open oval" shape.

Taiganja are precious metal ornaments found in Central Sulawesi, Indonesia, especially in the Sigi Regency. They are used as a kind of jewelry to enhance the status of the wearer, or as protective amulets. The core shape of the taiganja, reminiscent of the female genitalia, is an endemic shape that has been found throughout the Southeast Asian region.

== Archaeology ==
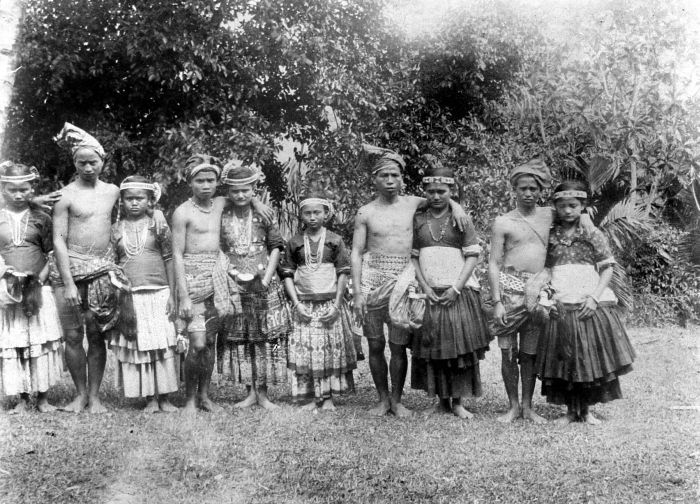
The Kulawi people of Central Sulawesi, where taiganja are still used as a kind of valuable heirloom objects handed generation to generation.

Taiganja are made of brass, or bronze, or silver or the rarest, gold. They are produced using lost-wax casting method with mostly brass or bronze as their ingredients. Manufacturing sites of taiganja-like objects have been found throughout the eastern part of the Indonesian archipelago as well as the Southeast Asian islands to the north of Indonesia.

The shape of taiganja, with the hole in the center and a slit running from the center of the circle toward the bottom (reminiscent of a keyhole), represents the female genitalia. This omega-shape form is similar to other ornamental objects discovered throughout the archipelago, one example is the mamuli of the west Sumba people. The omega-shaped form of metal artifacts is also known as the "open oval". The open oval shape is thought to symbolize fertility, the ability of the female member of the community to create life through birth. The shape is endemic throughout the region of Southeast Asia. Open oval shape first appeared around 500 BC in the Southeast Asian region where the Austronesian culture flourished e.g. in Taiwan, in the Philippines, and in the southern and central region of Vietnam. There is a connection with the flow of other bronze objects discovered in the same time period e.g. the Dong Son drum and the bronze axes. Manufacturing sites for "open oval" objects have been discovered in excavation sites throughout the region.

In the eastern part of Indonesia (e.g. Flores, Southeast Maluku, Sumba, and Central Sulawesi), these objects reach the greatest variety of form and dimension. Here the objects would reach enormous size, functioning as a very valuable heirloom object. Open oval objects have been found in excavation sites or handed down generation to generation.

The taiganja of Central Sulawesi are still found and used ritually in the tribe of Kulawi and Kaili in Sigi Regency.

== Form ==
Similar with other omega-shape objects found in the Nusantara, the taiganja has a core (the body, tubu) with the typical circular hole in the center, and a slit running from the center of the hole through the bottom part of the objects. This core shape is surrounded with heavy decoration of animal figures or intricate curling and branching patterns, flanking the core at its sides to create a symmetrical form. The ornament's which decorates the core has names depending on where they are positioned in relation to the core: jonga ("head", if placed on top of the core), sopa ("feet", if they flank the core at the bottom), and tali ranga (if they flank the core at its sides).

The most common decoration are zoomorphic figures e.g. stylized naga, dog-like creature, buffalo, crab, butterfly or bird heads.

== Function and rituals ==
Similar with ornaments around the region, taiganja are a symbol of status and reserved for the royal family or chiefs. They are hung from glass bead necklaces, or on the suit, or sometimes on the cap of a nobleman, as a king of amulet. They are ornaments of both men and women.

In the Kulawi tribe of Central Sulawesi, taiganja is critical in the practice of gift exchanges at weddings or during communal feasts at funerals.

The taiganja also works as a kind of protective amulet to keep evil at bay.

== Cited works ==
- Ing Huong; et al. (2008). Koleksi taiganja. Museum Negeri Propinsi Sulawesi Tengah.
- Muhammad Husni; Tiarma Rita Siregar (2000). Perhiasan Tradisional Indonesia [Traditional Ornaments of Indonesia]. Direktorat Jenderal Kebudayaan.
- Richter, Anne; Carpenter, Bruce W. (2012). Gold Jewellery of the Indonesian Archipelago. Editions Didier Millet. ISBN 9789814260381.
- Rodgers, Susan (1988). Power and gold: jewelry from Indonesia, Malaysia, and the Philippines : from the collection of the Barbier-Mueller Museum, Geneva. Prestel-Verlag. ISBN 9783791308593.
