= Indonesian ceremonial bronze axes =

Bronze Age objects of the Indonesian archipelago

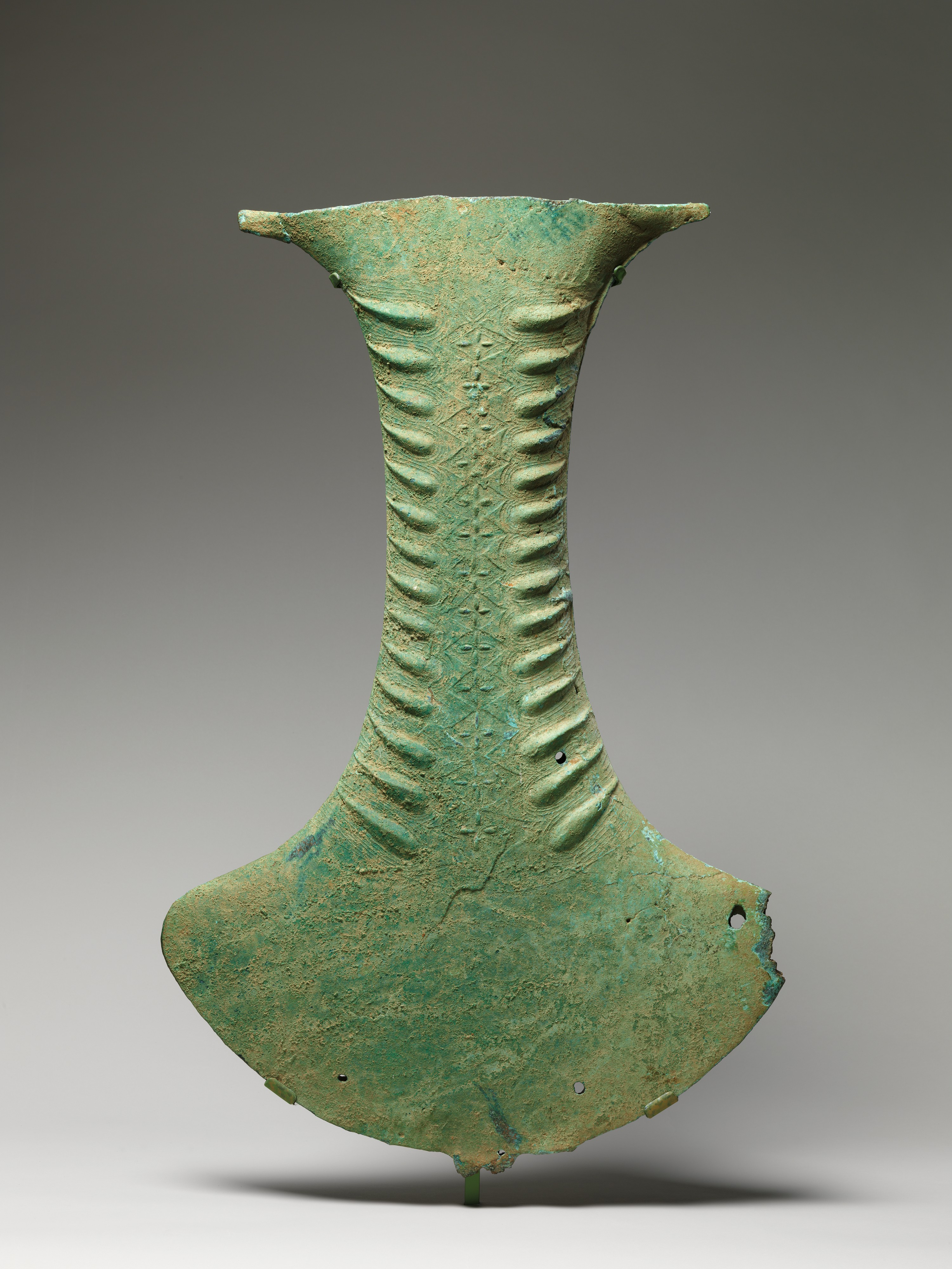
This ceremonial bronze axe found in Sulawesi bears similarity with other bronze axe objects e.g. in Rote Island, which may be used for ceremonial objects as a percussive instrument or as a water vessel.

The Indonesian ceremonial bronze axes were Bronze Age objects that were produced in the Indonesian archipelago between the 1st and 2nd century AD. Archaeological sites in Java, Bali, Sulawesi, the eastern islands, and around Lake Sentani in Papua have been uncovered, showing the bronze axes at the center of a bronze production or at burial sites. They are a testimony of the extensive trade network in the islands of the archipelago in the first millennium AD, thought to be connected to the Dong Son culture.

== Archaeology ==
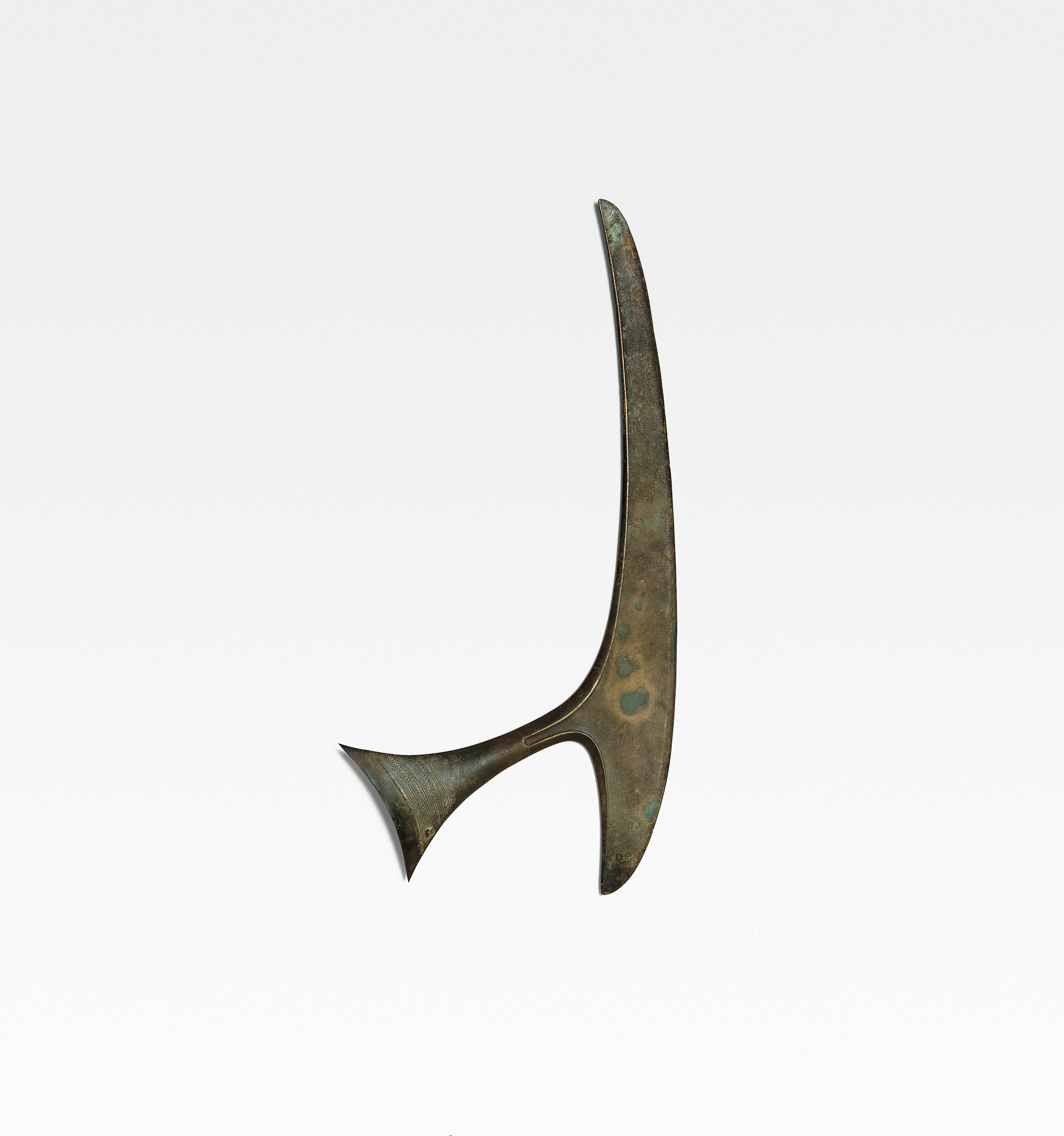
Blade-shaped bronze axe contains delicate pattern and are too weak to be used as weapon or agricultural tools, which indicates their ceremonial use.

The first record of metalwork in the Indonesian archipelago was around 500 BC. Most of the earliest bronze objects were probably used for ceremonies e.g., highly stylized axes and kettledrums. Findings of bronze objects from this period are numerous in Indonesia. Even people in the eastern side of Indonesia, that had not shown any signs of contact with Hinduism coming from the Indian subcontinent, had developed sophisticated metal-working techniques. Bronze must have been imported into these islands, because many small-sized islands e.g., Bali or Rote, did not mine copper nor tin, the raw materials for bronze-making, and yet bronze artifacts were found to be produced extensively in these islands.

Ceremonial bronze axes continued to be developed during the pre-Classic era from the 1st to 2nd century AD. During this period, bronze-casting industries flourished, especially in Java and Bali. These industries were probably instrumental in the manufacture of various kinds of bronze objects in Indonesia, including the ceremonial bronze axes. Various types of bronze axes were discovered across Indonesia e.g., numerous swallow-tail socketed bronze axes found in Java, the large axe with anthropomorphic carving e.g., those found in Rote Island and Makassar, and the curved bronze blade found in many sizes including miniatures. These archaeological findings of bronze objects production center and various sites indicating their use in a ceremony indicate a thriving inter-island trade in the Indonesian archipelago in the first millennium AD.

== Form ==
There are various forms of ceremonial bronze axes found in Indonesia. The similarities between these bronze axes are their artistic delicate patterns and their delicate fragile design which indicate their ceremonial use. A bronze ceremonial axe discovered in Landu on North Rote in 1875, contains anthropomorphic designs decorated with geometric patterns e.g., concentric circles, fish-bone pattern, and spirals, is very similar with the early art of the southwest Pacific; but with additional geometric motifs also found in bronze objects coming from mainland Asia, e.g., striated pattern. This is very similar with those discovered in Sulawesi, such as the Makassar Axe which was kept in the National Museum of Indonesia.

Large Indonesian ceremonial bronze axes, such as the Makassar Axe (measuring 70.5 centimetres (27.8 in) in length and 30 centimetres (12 in) in width) and the similar Metropolitan Museum of Art example (105.1 centimetres (41.4 in) x 67.3 centimetres (26.5 in))—both classified as Soejono Type IIB, were too large to be practical. This type of enormous bronze axes was produced using lost-wax casting in two parts which was then combined in the middle. The final object contains a hollow. This well-decorated bronze axe was without a doubt ceremonial in use, but the exact nature of the use is unknown. Being hollow (because the two parts were combined into one), it may have been used as a water vessel, or hanged as percussive instrument, or simply acted as heirloom objects as a symbol of status in important ceremonies.

Swallow-tail socketed bronze axes were found in Java. An exceptionally large axe discovered in Bogor have its swallowtail part adorned on one of its surfaces by a roughly drawn mask with bud-shaped eyes.

Other types of Indonesian ceremonial bronze axe are the curved blades which have been discovered everywhere in the archipelago from West Java (e.g., at Bandung) to Sulawesi. The blade-shaped bronze axes were produced in full size and as miniatures. Although looking like a weapon, the elegant blade was not strong enough for any practical use in either warfare or agriculture use.

Illustration of these axes carried by plumed warriors appears on various bronze objects across the archipelago and northern Vietnam, the origin of the Dong Son drum.

== See also ==
- Pejeng drum

== Cited works ==
- Bellwood, Peter (2001). "Ceremonial Bronzes of the Pre-Classic Era". In Miksic, John (ed.). Ancient History. Indonesian Heritage. Archipelago Press. ISBN 9813018267.
- I Wayan Ardika (2001). "Social Complexity in Late Prehistoric Java". In Miksic, John (ed.). Ancient History. Indonesian Heritage. Archipelago Press. ISBN 9813018267.
- Heekeren, H.R. (2013). The Bronze-Iron Age of Indonesia. Verhandelingen van het Koninklijk Instituut voor Taal-, Land- en Volkenkunde. Vol. 22. Springer Science & Business Media. ISBN 9789401509091.
- Miksic, John (2001). "The Hunting and Gathering Stage in Eastern Indonesia". In Miksic, John (ed.). Ancient History. Indonesian Heritage. Archipelago Press. ISBN 9813018267.
