= Prohear, Cambodia =

Archaeological site in Cambodia

Prohear
- Location in Cambodia
- 11.541074°N 105.521155°E
- Location: Prey Veng province, Cambodia

Site notes
- Archaeologists: Andreas Reinecke, Sonetra Seng, Simone Krais, Vin Laychour

Prohear is an archaeological site from the Early Iron Age located in the Prey Veng province of Cambodia between the capital city of Phnom Penh and the border with Vietnam. By the time the site became known to archaeologists in 2007, it had been heavily looted and few archaeological materials remained. Prohear is known for its burials and uniquely rich array of grave goods including numerous precious metal artifacts. A number of the artifacts excavated at the site have contributed to the study of trade routes that connected Prohear to the rest of Southeast Asia.

== History of the site ==
Prohear was active during the Iron Age, with burials at the site being dated to a period between 200 BC and 100 AD. At this point in time in Southeast Asia, inhabitants of the region lived in smaller farming communities that predated the development of larger centralized nation-states.

== Discovery ==
In 2007, villagers in the town of Prohear discovered the presence of ancient artifacts and began to purposefully dig for them with the intention of selling them. Local archaeology students attempted to intervene, but by the time formal excavations were organized, the majority of the burials in the cemetery had been looted. The only part of the site that remained mostly untouched was an area that lay beneath the main road running through the village. A series of rescue excavations were conducted in 2008, 2009, and 2011 with the goal of preserving as much of the remaining archaeological record at the site as possible.

== Archaeology ==
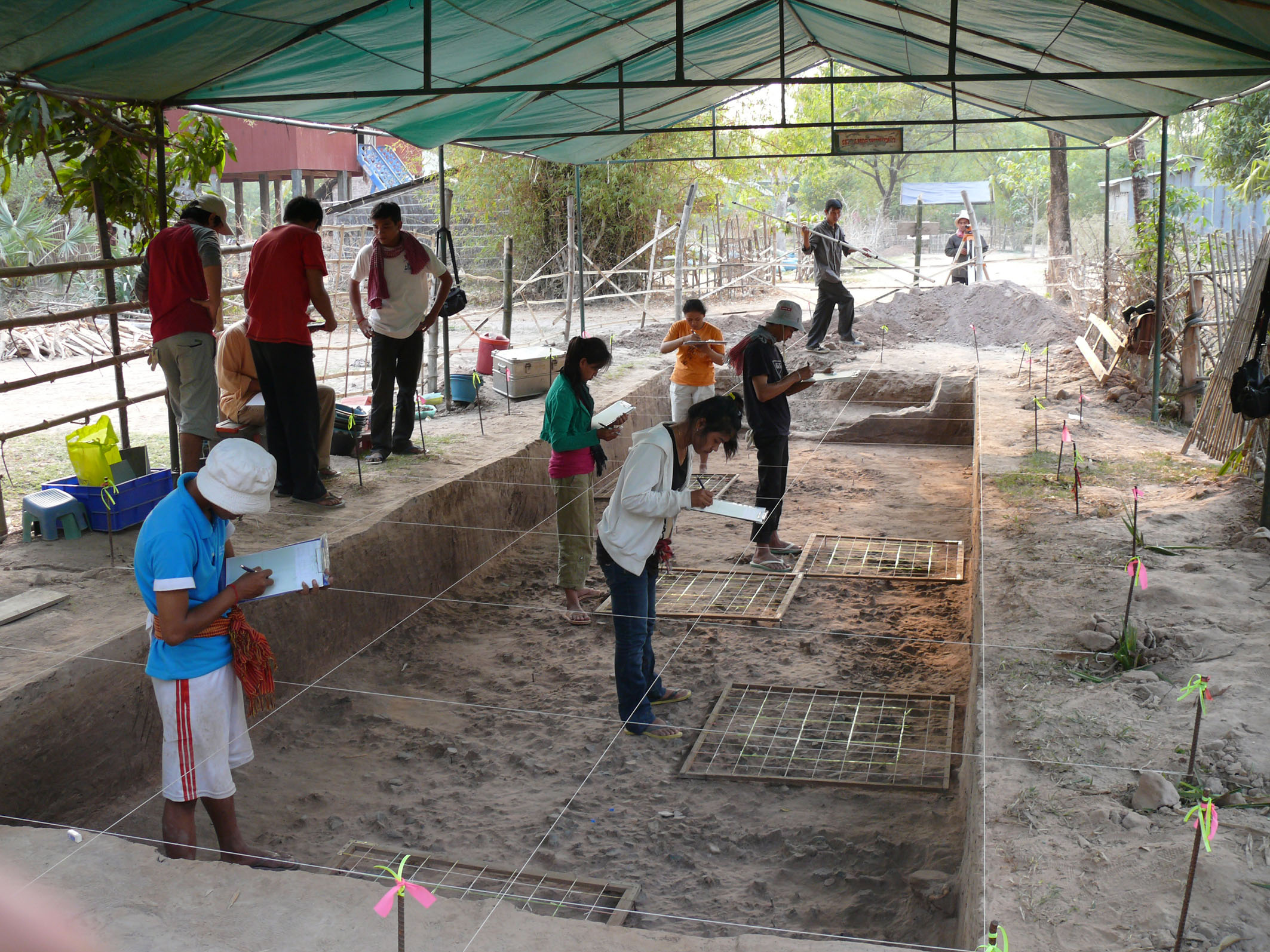
Archaeological excavations underway at the Prohear site

The excavations conducted at Prohear were a collaboration between the German Archaeological Institute (DAI), based in Berlin and the Memot Centre for Archaeology in Cambodia.

=== Environmental conditions ===
Cambodia has a tropical climate with warm temperatures and high moisture levels. Annual cycles of monsoon winds dictate weather patterns; winds blowing from the southwest from mid-summer to mid-fall carry torrential rains while winds blowing from the northeast carry less moisture and initiate a dry season from fall to spring. The high humidity creates obstacles to the preservation of organic materials, which limits what archaeologists in the region are able to study.

=== Burials ===
76 burial complexes were excavated at Prohear that were consistent with other Bronze and Iron Age burial sites in the region, dating to around 150 BC to 50 AD. Individuals were buried lying on their backs. Wealthier individuals were buried with richer grave goods; there are several examples of wealthier individuals buried with their heads inside the bronze drums characteristic of the region or beneath bronze disks. These burial circumstances might have indicated the importance of the individuals within the community.

Due to the environmental conditions at the site, there was generally very poor preservation of human skeletal remains, greatly limiting the analysis that the researchers could conduct. Instead, they focused on dental remains, finding evidence that the people who lived in the area were generally healthy, despite the expected high rate of child mortality. The dental remains showed significant wear due to extensive use of the teeth, demonstrating patterns consistent with living in farming communities. There was also evidence found of cultural modification practices such as tooth blackening, a practice that is still followed in different Southeast Asian communities.

=== Artifacts ===
==== Metallurgy ====
A large number of artifacts containing precious metals such as gold and silver have been found at Prohear. 93 gold and silver artifacts were found, mostly consisting of jewelry pieces such as earrings, rings, and bracelets. This is notable because contemporary Iron Age sites that were excavated revealed far fewer gold and silver artifacts. The gold and silver artifacts were subject to trading throughout the region. The chemical composition of the artifacts reveal that many are alloys of electrum and silver with little real gold. An analysis of the different compositions of the artifacts were used to determine that the alloys were created intentionally, meaning that a craftsman who worked with gold would have been close to Prohear.

==== Beads ====
A number of beads were found in the burials at Prohear, numbering to around 2,580, consisting of mostly glass but also including stone beads made from garnet, carnelian, and agate. This amount of beads is typical for a site from this time period.

=== Trade connections ===
The Chinese writer and traveler Zhou Daguan wrote about Cambodia in 1297, remarking on the gold and silver trade he encountered there. He wrote that the people in Cambodia had no source of gold or silver to mine themselves, so they traded for it with the Chinese using various goods, such as rhinoceros horns and cardamom. This indicates that the gold found at Prohear may have come from China, and gives us insight into the relationships that different regions shared. The beads that were found in Prohear were probably imported as well, since there is no evidence of bead production in southern Cambodia from the time when the site was occupied. The glass beads were most likely sourced from southern coastal Vietnam, while the stone beads could have come from a variety of sources including Thailand, India, and Sri Lanka.
