= Đông Sơn village =

Village and archaeological site in Vietnam

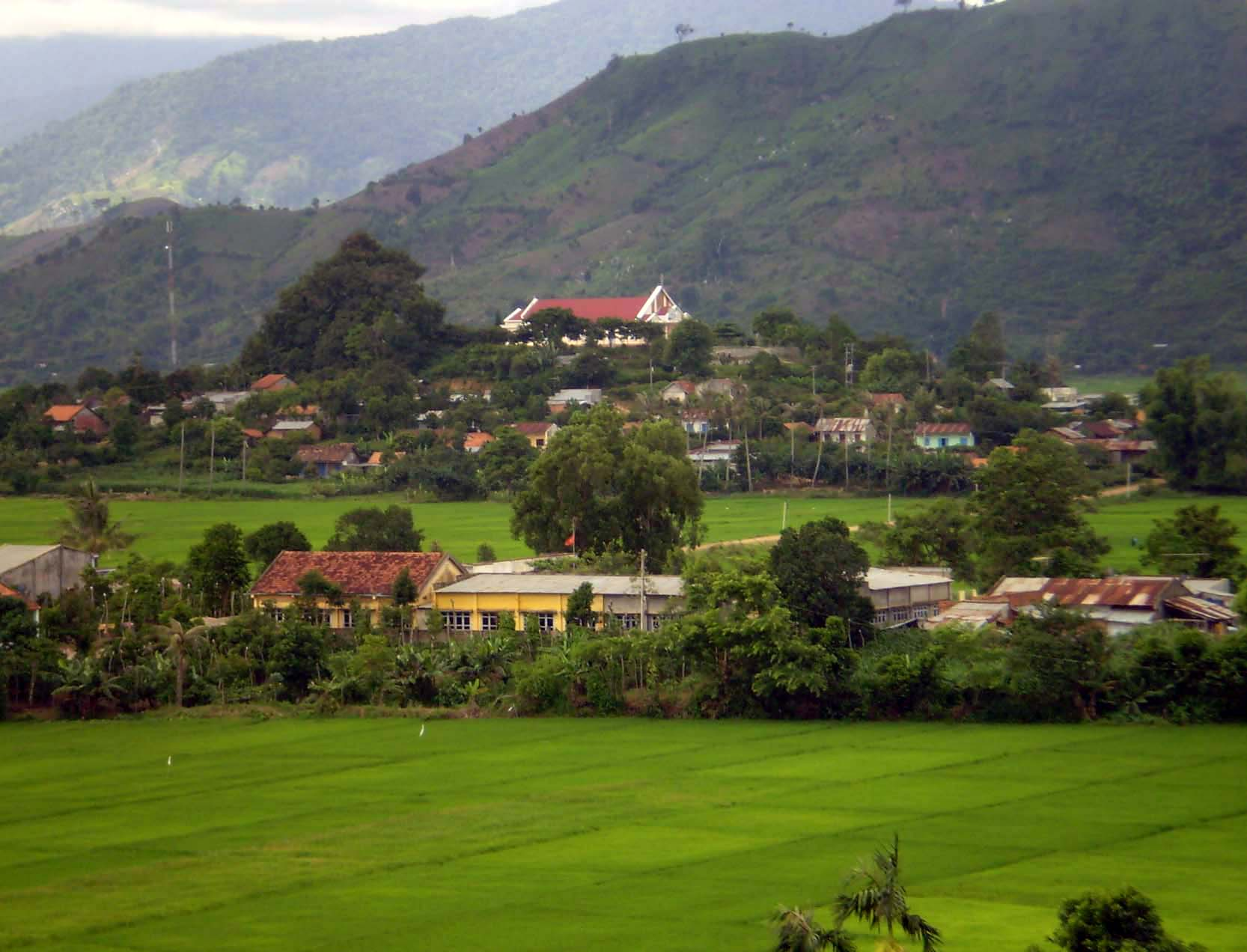

Đông Sơn village (Vietnamese: làng Đông Sơn) is a small village on the banks of the Mã River in Hàm Rồng ward, Thanh Hóa city, Thanh Hóa Province. The village is best known for the discovery in 1924 of artifacts of what was later named Đông Sơn culture.

In 1924 a local fisherman stumbled on some bronze artifacts. On learning of the discovery the director of the École française d'Extrême-Orient, Léonard Eugène Aurousseau (1888-1929), instructed a local French customs official named Louis Pajot to investigate the location. Pajot immediately discovered numerous graves and set to work to excavate them. When the importance of the finds was realised the site was entrusted to professional archaeologists including Olov Janse.
