= Olov Janse =

Swedish archaeologist (1892–1985)

Robert Ture Olov Janse
- Born: August 3, 1892; Norrköping, Sweden
- Died: March, 1985 (aged 92–93); Washington, D.C., United States
- Education: Uppsala University
- Known for: Excavation work at Đông Sơn, research on Southeast Asian archaeology
- Scientific career
- Fields: Archaeology
- Workplaces: National Archaeological Museum; École du Louvre; École pratique des hautes études University of Paris; Harvard University; UNESCO
- Thesis: (1922)

Professor Robert Ture Olov Janse (August 3, 1892, in Norrköping, Sweden – March 1985, in Washington, D.C., United States) was a Swedish archaeologist. He is notable for his excavation work at Đông Sơn between 1935 and 1939. Though he originally argued a viewpoint for the European origins of Bronze Age culture in Vietnam, he reversed himself in support of Chinese origins after he started excavations at Đông Sơn. Janse is characterized as having introduced order into the research of the history of archaeology in Mainland Southeast Asia.

== Early life and education ==
Janse was the son of candy factory owner Thure Johan Janse and Hilma Wilhelmina Svensson. His uncle, Otto Janse, who was an archaeologist who specialized in Swedish medieval history, was an inspiration to Olov in choosing his field of study, archaeology. Olov also received inspiration from Ture Nerman. Nerman and his brothers, Birger and Ejnar, became lifelong friends with Olov. Stated the archaeologist Birger Nerman, "I soon grew tired of sweets, but got a friend for life."

Janse received his early education at De Geer school in Norrköping. He graduated from Uppsala University with a Bachelor of Arts degree in 1916, a Master of Arts degree in 1920, and his doctorate in 1922. on the thesis Le travail de l'or en Suède à l'époque mérovingienne. Études précédées d'un mémoire sur les solidi romains & byzantins trouvés en Suède.

== Career ==
Between 1920 and 1930, he worked as an assistant curator at the National Archaeological Museum in Saint-Germain-en-Laye, France. He held the position of associate professor of national and prehistoric archaeology at the École du Louvre during the period of 1925 to 1927, lectured as an associate professor from 1928 through 1936 at the École pratique des hautes études at the Sorbonne. He was appointed honorary professor at the University of Paris in 1934. His work alternated between Paris and Stockholm at different institutions.

During the following years, Janse was director of the Archaeological Expedition to Indochina, composed of a research team of archaeologists and ethnologists who made important excavations in French Indochina. Janse used the practice of typology-based archaeology to his field of prehistoric research. He excavated the Đông Sơn site, and other sites in Viet Nam over the course of three periods from November 1934 through November 1938. He also excavated Han and Tang dynasty Chinese monuments and tombs, in fact, finding both Dong Son culture and Han-style brick tombs at the Đông Sơn archaeological site. During his third excavation, he also spent time at the Sa Huỳnh sites in Quảng Ngãi Province. While most of the ceramics that he unearthed during these excavations were deposited in various museums around the world, he gave some to King Gustavus Adolphus of Sweden, perhaps as a gesture of patriotism.

During World War II, Janse went to the United States where he worked as an advisor to the U.S. intelligence agency, Office of Strategic Services. Janse became a professor of East Asian Archaeology at Harvard University in 1940, a position he held through 1943. Thereafter he worked at UNESCO, and then in Korea.

His was influenced by Oscar Montelius, Johan Gunnar Andersson, and Henri Hubert.

== Personal life ==
Janse was married to Renee Sokolsky (b. circa 1903, Russia; died 2000). She accompanied him on his scientific trips. In 1940, Janse and his wife settled in the United States, and in 1948 he became a U.S. citizen. At retirement, they lived in an upscale retirement home at 4000 Massachusetts Avenue in Washington, D.C. where he died in 1985 after complications from a traffic accident. He became a member of the Royal Swedish Academy of Letters, History and Antiquities in 1961.

== Legacy ==
In 2002, the antiquities donated by his widow, Renee Janse, became the Olov and Renee Jansen Memorial Fund. The Jansen East Asian collections held today include the Museum of Far Eastern Antiquities, Stockholm, the Musée Cernuschi in Paris, the Musée du Louvre in Paris, and the Peabody Museum of Archaeology and Ethnology in Cambridge, Massachusetts, US.

The Bortom Synranden is a biographical research project regarding the work of Jansen.

The Chinese ceramics that Janse collected in 1939 from the Malay Peninsula are in the National Museum of Singapore. Other collections of his cultural materials are housed at the Cernushi Museum, the Guimet Museum, the Louvre, the Museum of Art and History, and the Museum of Far Eastern Antiquities.
