= Bronze drum =

Type of metal drum

Dong Son drums being displayed at the Ho Chi Minh City Museum of History.

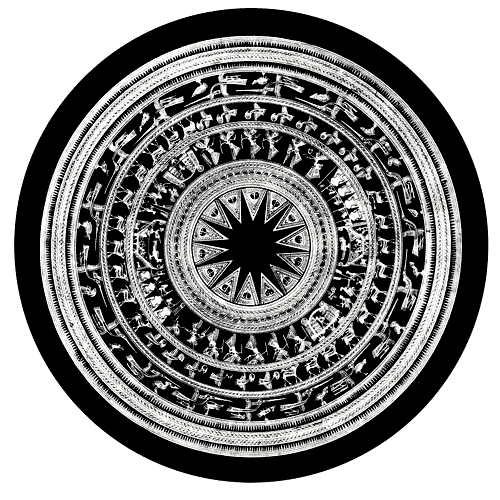
Ngọc Lũ bronze drum's surface, 2-3rd century BC, Vietnam

Bronze drums are ancient artifacts found in various cultures in Southeast Asia and southern China. The drums were cast in bronze using the lost-wax casting method. The drums were both musical instruments and cult objects. They are decorated with geometric patterns, scenes of daily life and war, animals and birds, and boats. Bronze drums are considered one of the national symbols of Vietnam.

== History ==
A Đông Sơn drum in Guimet Museum, Paris

The earliest written records describing the drum appeared in the Shi Ben, a Chinese book dated from the 3rd century BC. The Hou Hanshu, a late Han dynasty book dated to the 5th century AD, describes how the Han dynasty general Ma Yuan collected bronze drums from northern Vietnam to melt down and recast into bronze horses.

Bronze drums are venerated in Vietnamese folk religion. Thần Đồng Cổ (bronze drum god) along with excavated bronze drums were worshipped in several temples such as the Đồng Cổ Temple in Thanh Hóa and the Cao Sơn Temple in Hanoi. The 14th century book Việt Điện U Linh Tập mentioned the Bronze drum cult as early as in 1020.

In 1902, a collection of 165 large bronze drums was published by Austrian archaeologist Franz Heger, who subdivided them into a classification of four types. Chinese archaeologists classify them into the heavier Yue drums, including the Đông Sơn drums, and the Dian drums, which has eight subtypes: Wanjiaba, Shizhaishan, Lengshuichong, Zunyi, Majiang, Beiliu, Lingshan and Ximeng.

In China, during the Great Leap Forward campaign from 1958 to 1960, people were mobilized to collect all metal materials, including ancient bronze wares, were melted down to producing steel in backyard furnaces. Many ancient bronze drums were destroyed as the result.

== Types ==
=== Wanjiaba drum (pre-Heger I) ===
A Wanjiaba type bronze drum at Yunnan Provincial Museum

In 1976, Chinese archaeologists discovered a Type I drum in Wanjiaba (万家坝), Chuxiong prefecture, Yunnan. They usually feature simple or no decorations. By 1990, Chinese archaeologists had identified 29 Wanjiaba-type bronze drums, of which 26 were found in Yunnan, one in Vietnam, and two in Thailand. As a result, Chinese scholars began to discard Heger's classification to support the view that Yunnan, not Vietnam had yielded the earliest bronze drums, and that Wanjiaba was the birthplace of the bronze drum. This claim has fueled objections from Vietnamese archaeologists who classify Wanjiaba drums, also found in Vietnam, to belong in the late Heger I period.

=== Đông Sơn drum (Heger I) ===
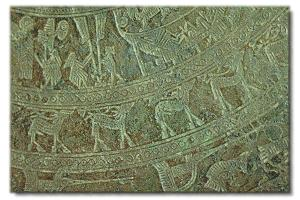
Castings on the Ngọc Lũ drum's surface

Đông Sơn drums were produced from about 600 BC until the third century CE by the Đông Sơn culture centered in the Red River Delta. They were classified into five groups by the Vietnamese scholar Pham Huy Thong. One iconic pattern found on the top of all Đông Sơn drums is a "star" image, with various number of spikes radiating out from a center, its meaning is unknown at present. The majority of drums found have a 12-pointed star image, while Cổ Loa, Ngọc Lũ, Sông Đà, Thượng Lâm feature a 14-angled star. The Hoàng Hạ drum has a 16-pointed star and Bình Đà drum has a 6-pointed star. Đông Sơn drums are also found in the islands of Indonesia and were discovered as far as in Java and New Guinea and is seen as proof of trade connections between these regions. According to researchers, bronze drums originated from the Dong Son culture, which is associated with the period when the Hung Kings established the Van Lang kingdom. Bronze drums have become a sacred symbol of Vietnamese national culture.

=== Dian drum ===
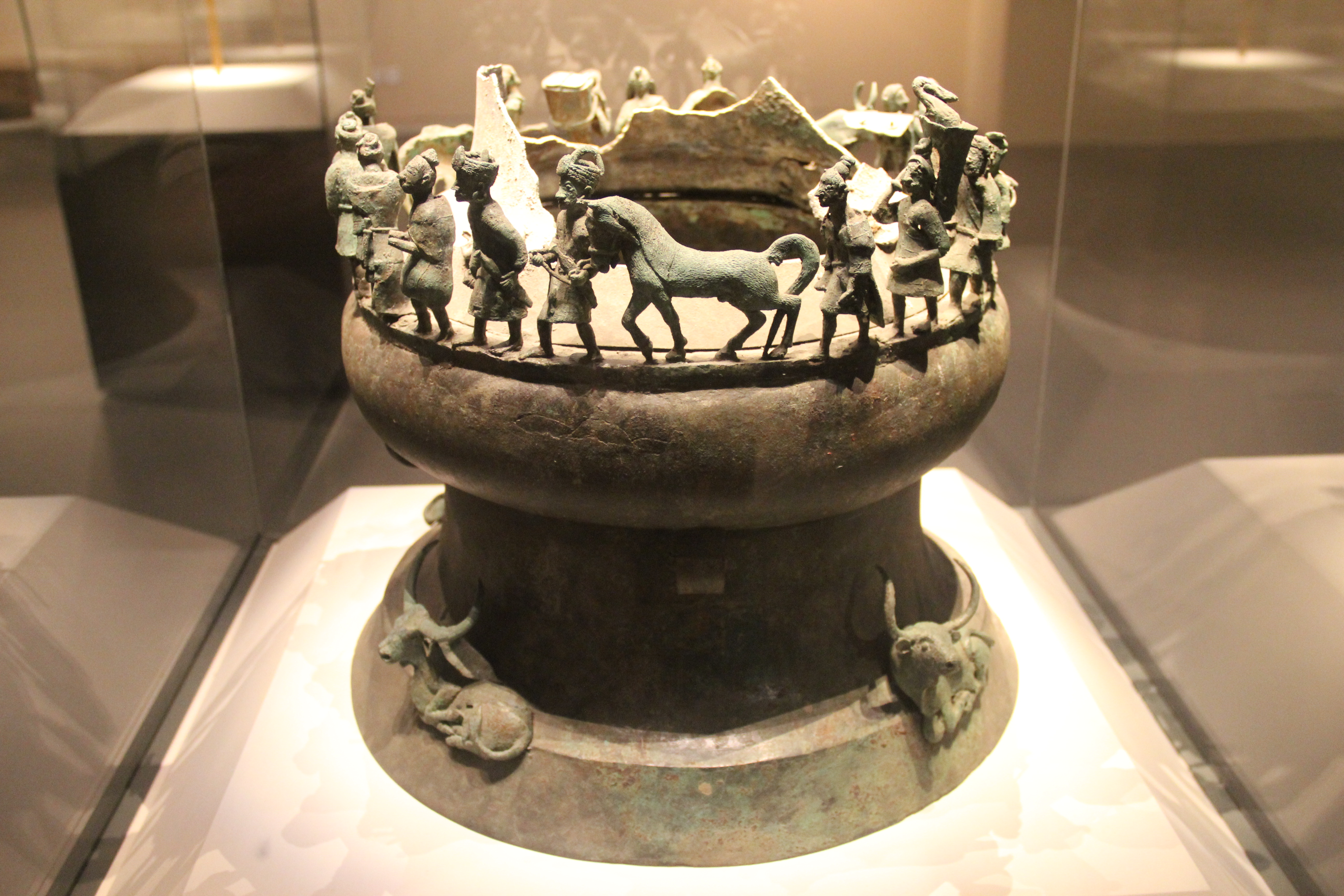
A Dian bronze drum

Dian was a 3rd to 2nd century BC kingdom situated in Yunnan, southwestern China. The Dian people were sophisticated metal workers, they used both the piece mould method and the lost wax method to cast large bronze objects. Ritual burials of Dian elites were accompanied by large bronze drums filled with cowrie shells. The tops of the drums were removed and replaced by bronze lids and the bronze drums sometimes turn into a type of ritual vessel, containing votive objects.

=== Shizaishan drum ===
A large number of Heger I drums were excavated in Yunnan and Guangxi such as Shizhaishan (1975) and Shaguo (1983) are referred to as Shizhaishan type drums. The Shizaishan tradition of Heger I type evolved from pre-Heger I type, having the same distribution areas of southern China and northern Vietnam. Unlike Đông Sơn, this tradition disappeared as early as in 1st century BC. After this, southern China experienced a period with few bronze drums.

=== Heger II (Li-Lao drum) ===
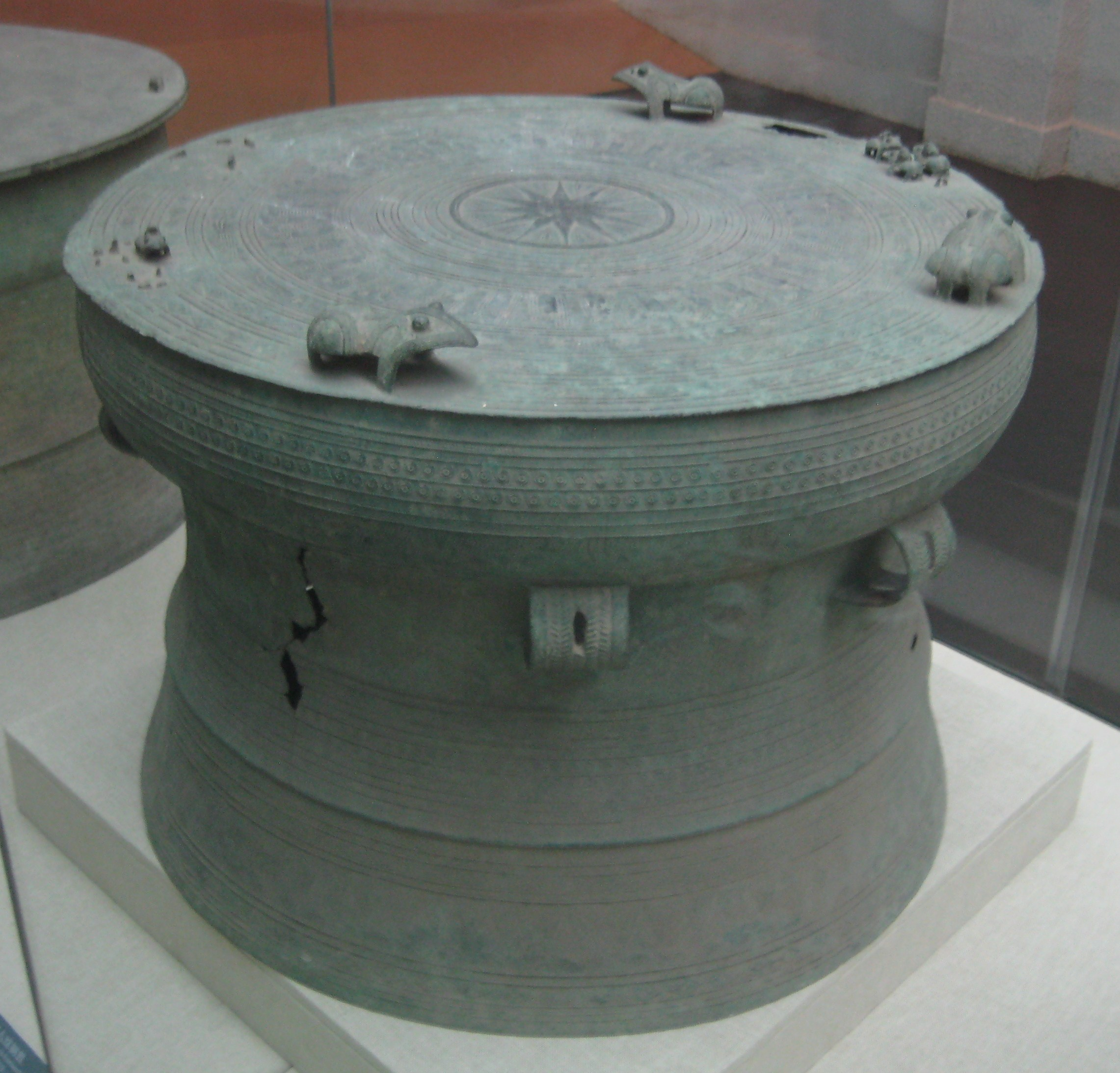
A Heger II bronze drum found in Pingnan, Guangxi, China

Li-Lao drums, named after the Li people from Hainan, are classified by Franz Heger as type II to distinguish with the Dian-Dong Son drums (Heger I). Li-Lao drums were found in Guangdong, Guangxi, the Red River Delta and the Muong hills. The Li-Lao drums are known for their large diameters and sizes and frogs figures. However, decorations on Li-Lao drums are much lesser and impressive than their predecessor. The drums are still being used by ethnic Zhuang and Yao in Guangxi as well as some Muong communities.

=== Heger III (Karen drums) ===
A Karen drum at the National Museum of Myanmar (Naypyidaw)

Karen drums a decorated with 12-pointed stars and two pairs of frogs on the tympanum surface. They are found in Vietnam, Laos, Thailand, Myanmar and Yunnan. They are still being used by the Karenni people as rain drums.

=== Heger IV ===
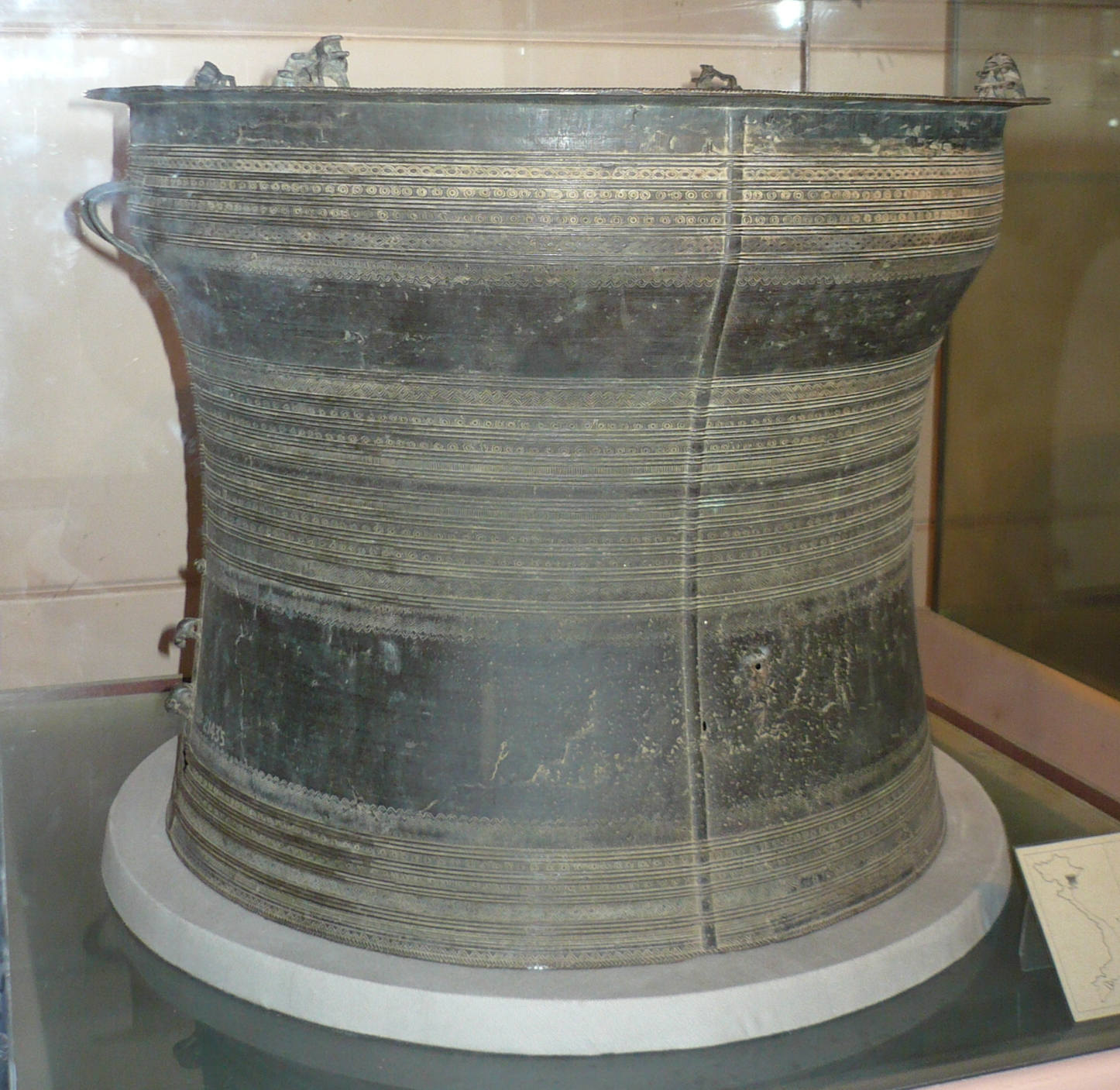
Tân Độ drum, a Heger III type drum, found in Hà Tây, Vietnam

Heger IV drums are found in China and Vietnam, they are sometimes decorated by Earthly Branches animals and other Chinese elements.

=== Pejeng drum ===
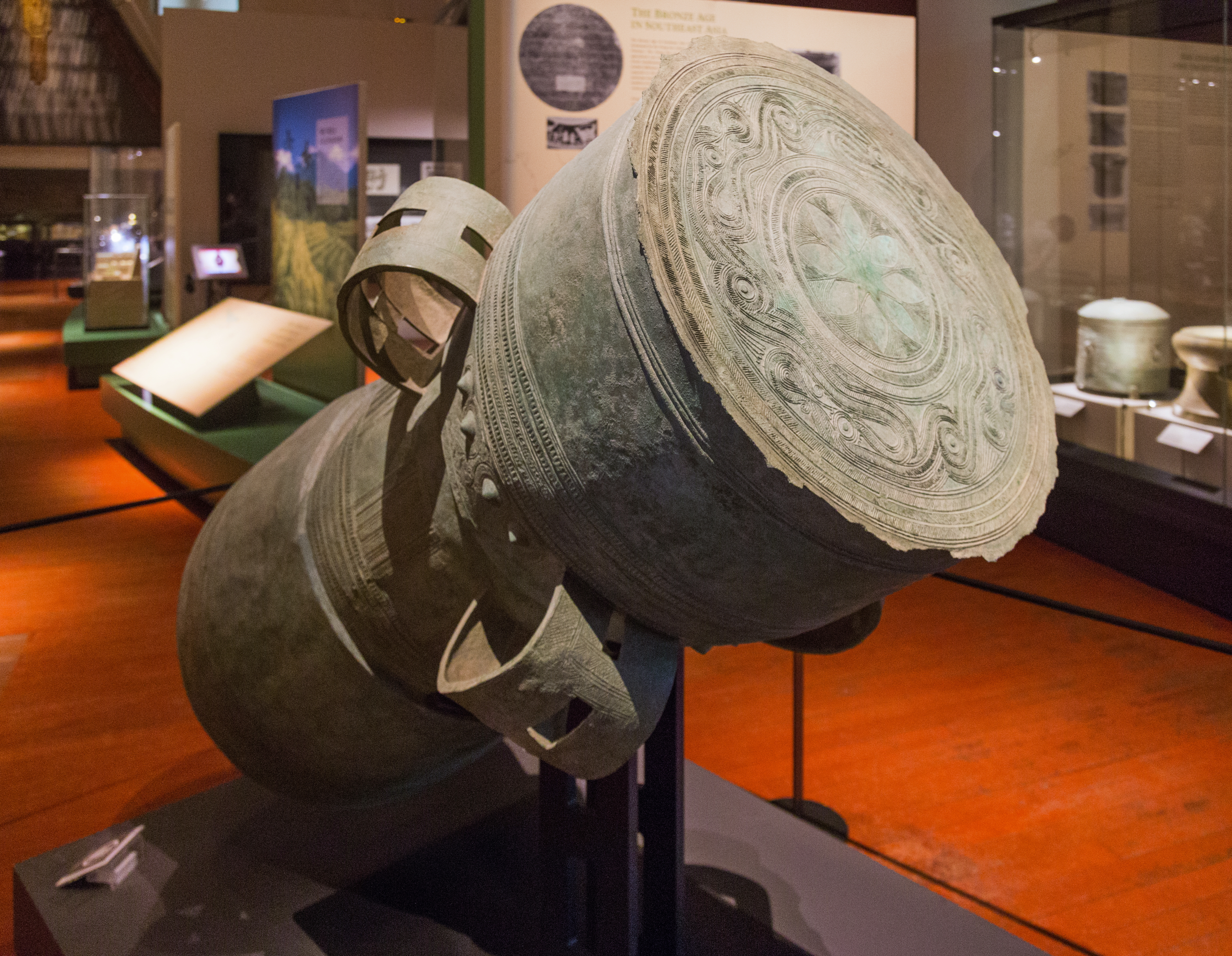
A pejeng drum discovered in East Java, displayed in the Asian Civilisations Museum, Singapore

Pejeng drums are Bronze Age kettledrums being made across the archipelago of Indonesia between the 1st and 2nd century AD. Examples include Moko drums in the island of Alor. Some scholars identify the design and decorations have their likely origin in the Đông Sơn culture of Vietnam. In Bali, the Moon of Pejeng is the largest drum of this type.

== Symbols and uses ==
An example vectorization of Đông Sơn drums' surfaces, popularly used for contemporary decorations.

In Vietnamese culture, the bronze drum (Vietnamese:Trống đồng, 𪔠銅) is an important national symbol of the Hùng Kings founding myth. The drum and images of its decorations, such as the Lạc bird, can be found in various modern settings such as logos, decor patterns and merchandises. It is used as a ritual object in the Hùng kings veneration festivals.

A Communist Party of Vietnam headquarters' guest-receiving room, with the wallpaper being decorated with a bronze drum design.

The Hy Cuong drum, found in 1990 in Co Tich Village, near the Hùng Temple in Phu Tho province is the largest bronze drum ever found in Vietnam with 93 centimetres in diameter. The drum is said to date back to between 3 BC and 1 AD, is viewed as a national treasure and is in exhibition at the Hùng Temple, which is dedicated to the Hùng Kings.

Bronze drum (Zhuang language: gyongduengz, 皷銅) is a cultural symbol of the Zhuang in southern China. The Zhuang folk tale, The origin of the bronze drum tells bronze drums that are like "stars" to ward off evil spirits. A giant bronze drum, six metres in diameter is a landmark in Huanjiang town, Guangxi. It was recognized as the largest bronze drum by Guinness World Records. Bronze drum dance tradition is maintained by ethnic Yi and Zhuang in some villages in Wenshan and Hechi. During the Cultural Revolution, bronze drums were regarded as remnants of a backward society and were being confiscated to be destroyed.

The bronze drum is also an important cultural heritage of the Karenni people, to them the drums are known as rain drums or frog drums (Hpà-si or pam klo), after the images of frogs that appear around the tympanum. There are two kinds of drums that are male drum and female drum. Frog drums are played by the Karenni to bring rain and in other rituals.

Bronze drums are still being used ceremoniously in South China and Southeast Asia by various ethnic groups, such as the Lolo people, Zhuang people, Karenni people, Khmu people, Miao people and Muong people. They are generally struck in the center with a soft mallet, and on the side with a wooden or bamboo stick. In Thailand, bronze drums are also used in some ceremonies in temples, where it's called the Mahorathuek (มโหระทึก).

== Gallery ==
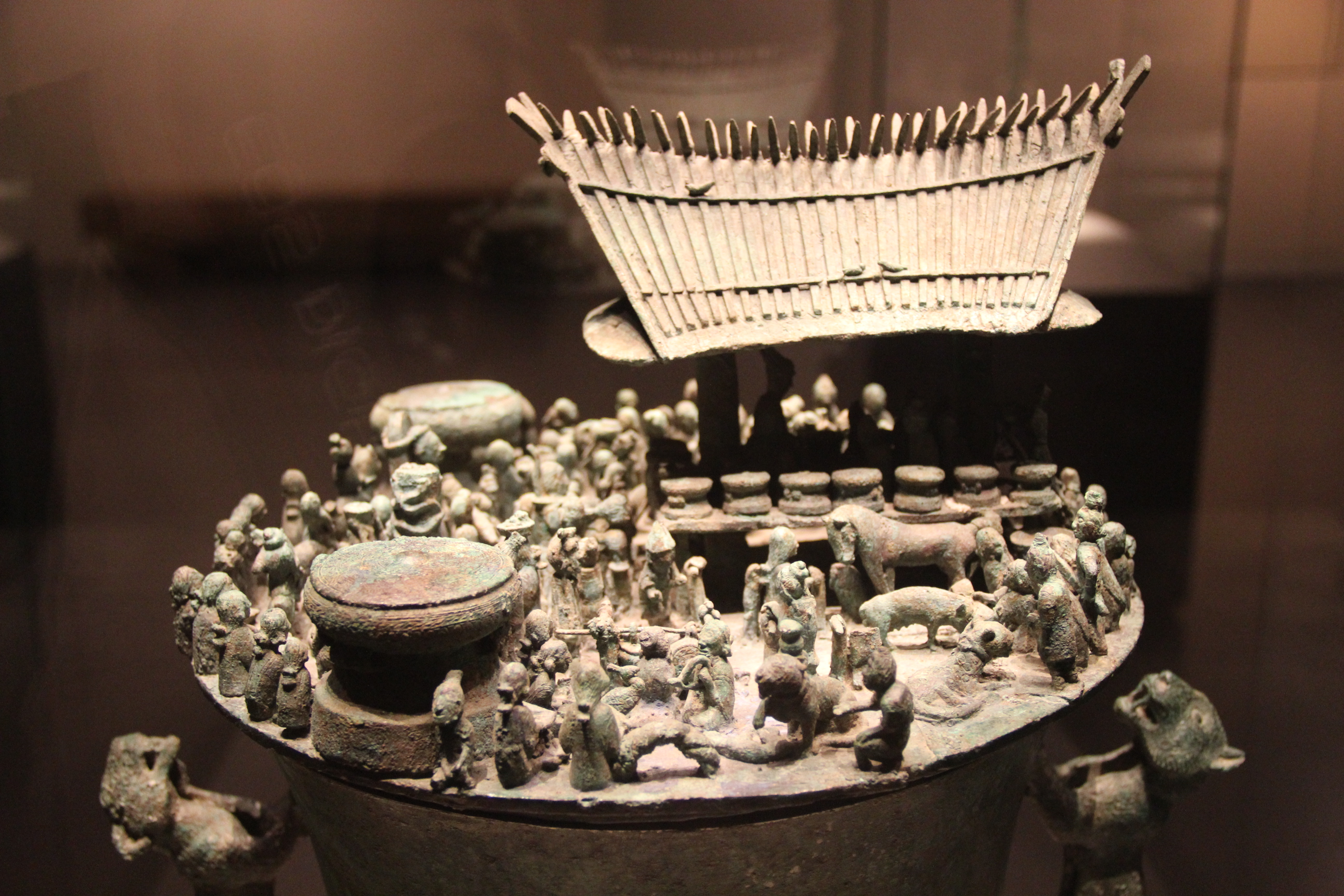
Decorative container depicting bronze drums. Dian Kingdom, Yunnan

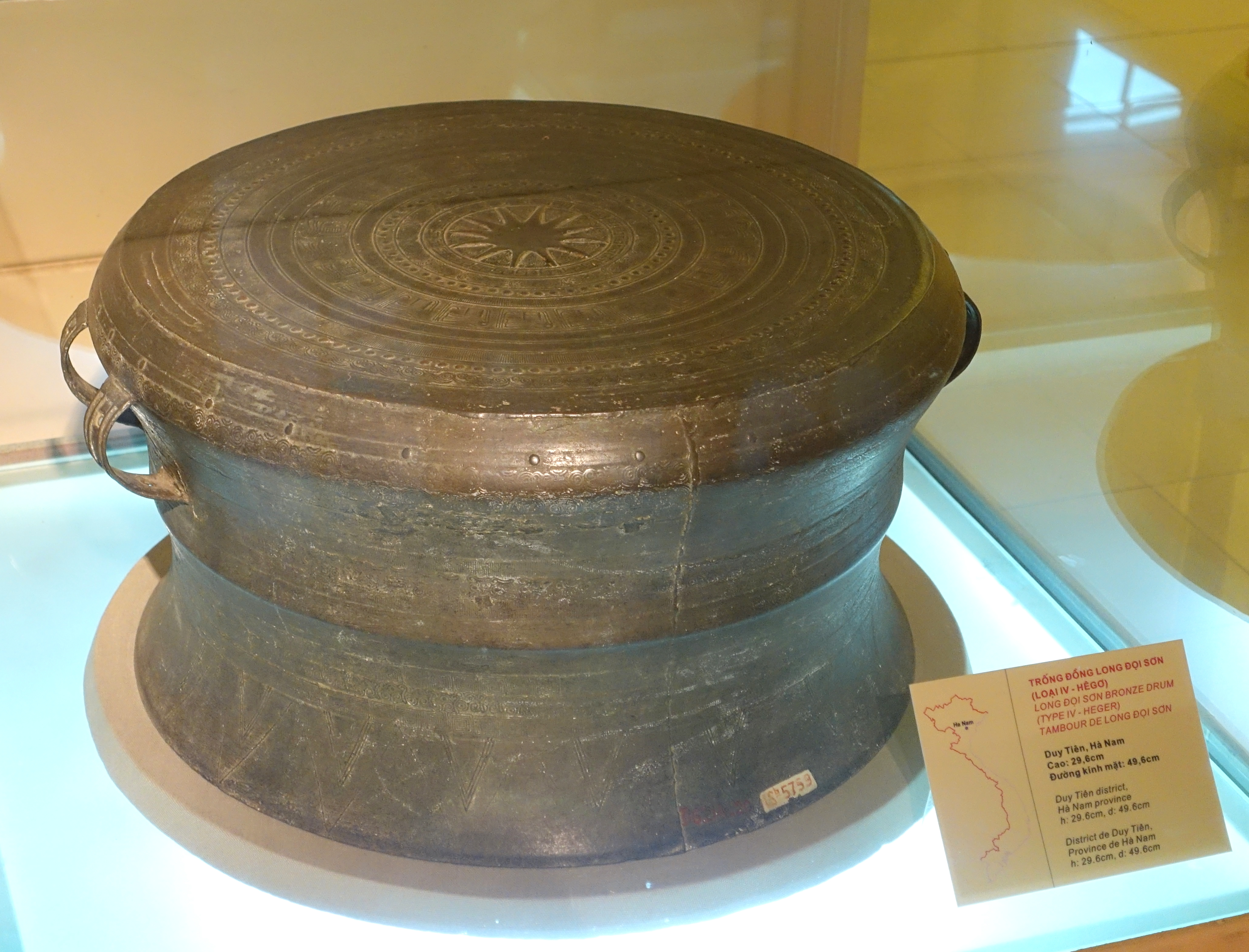
Long Doi Son drum, a Heger IV drum in exhibition at the National Museum of Vietnamese History, Hanoi

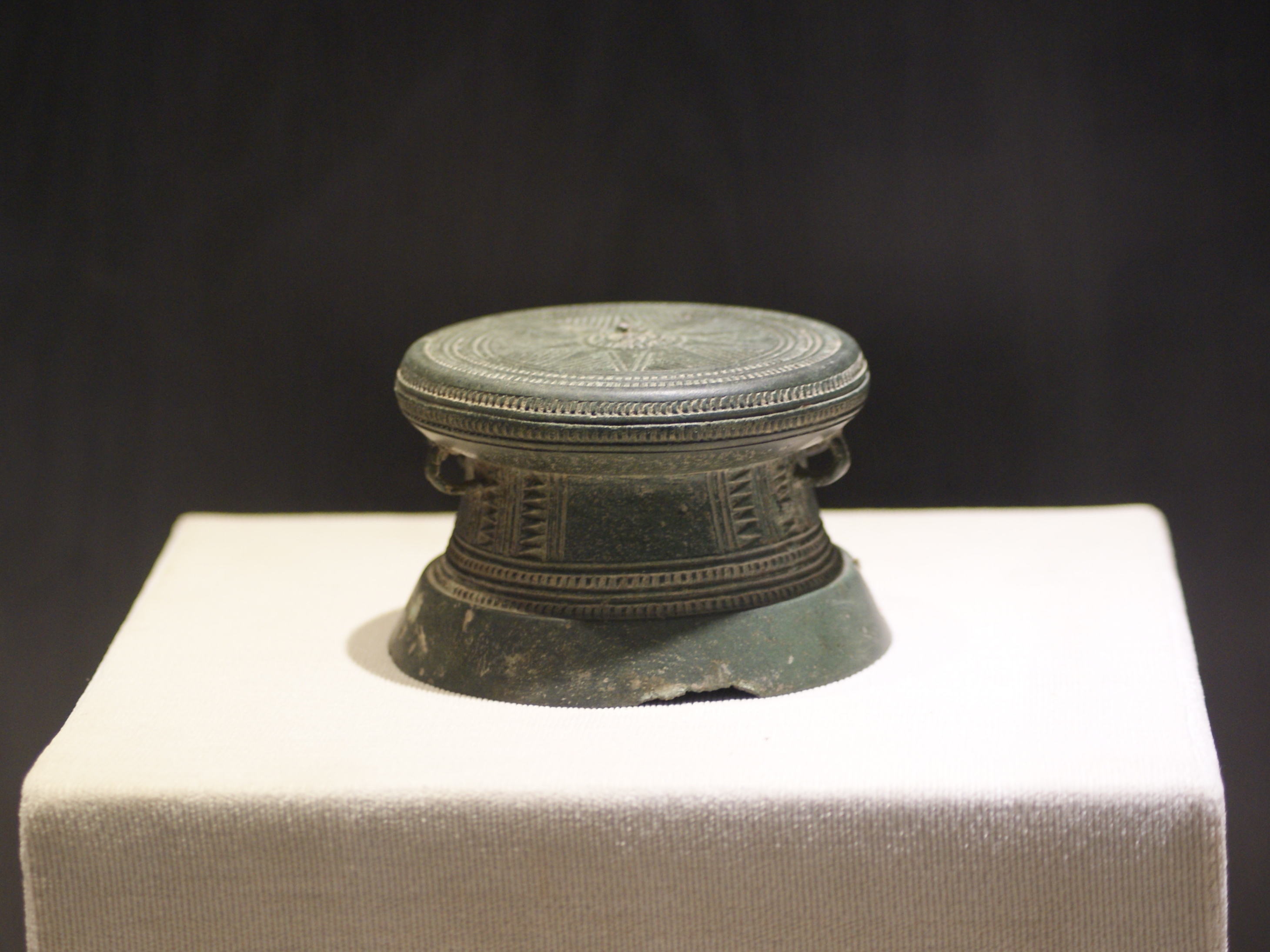
Miniature bronze drum, Hanoi Museum

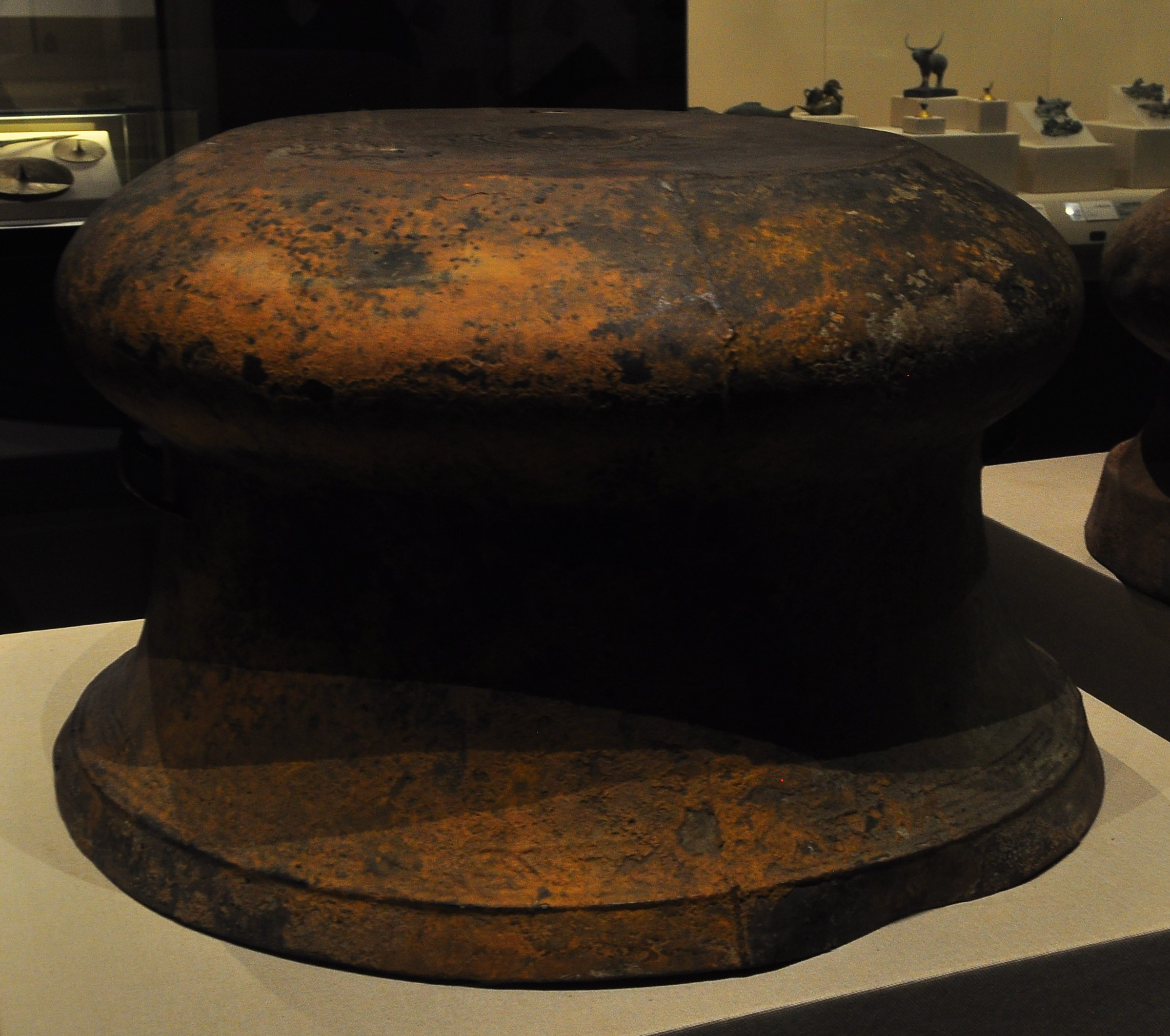
Wanjiaba drum, Yunnan Provincial Museum

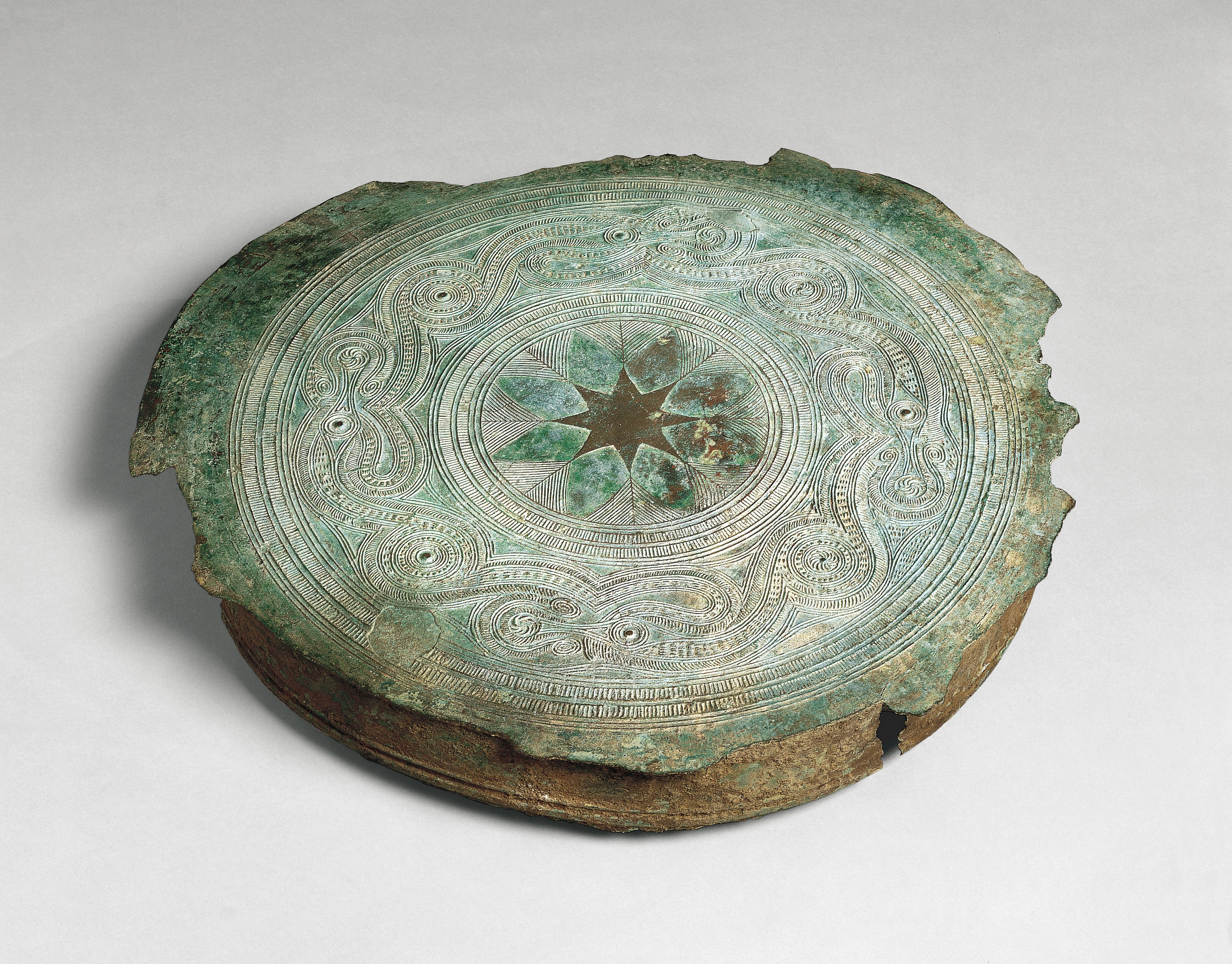
The separately-cast tympanum of a Pejeng-type drum found in Sumba

Flag of the Karen National Union features a stylized frog drum

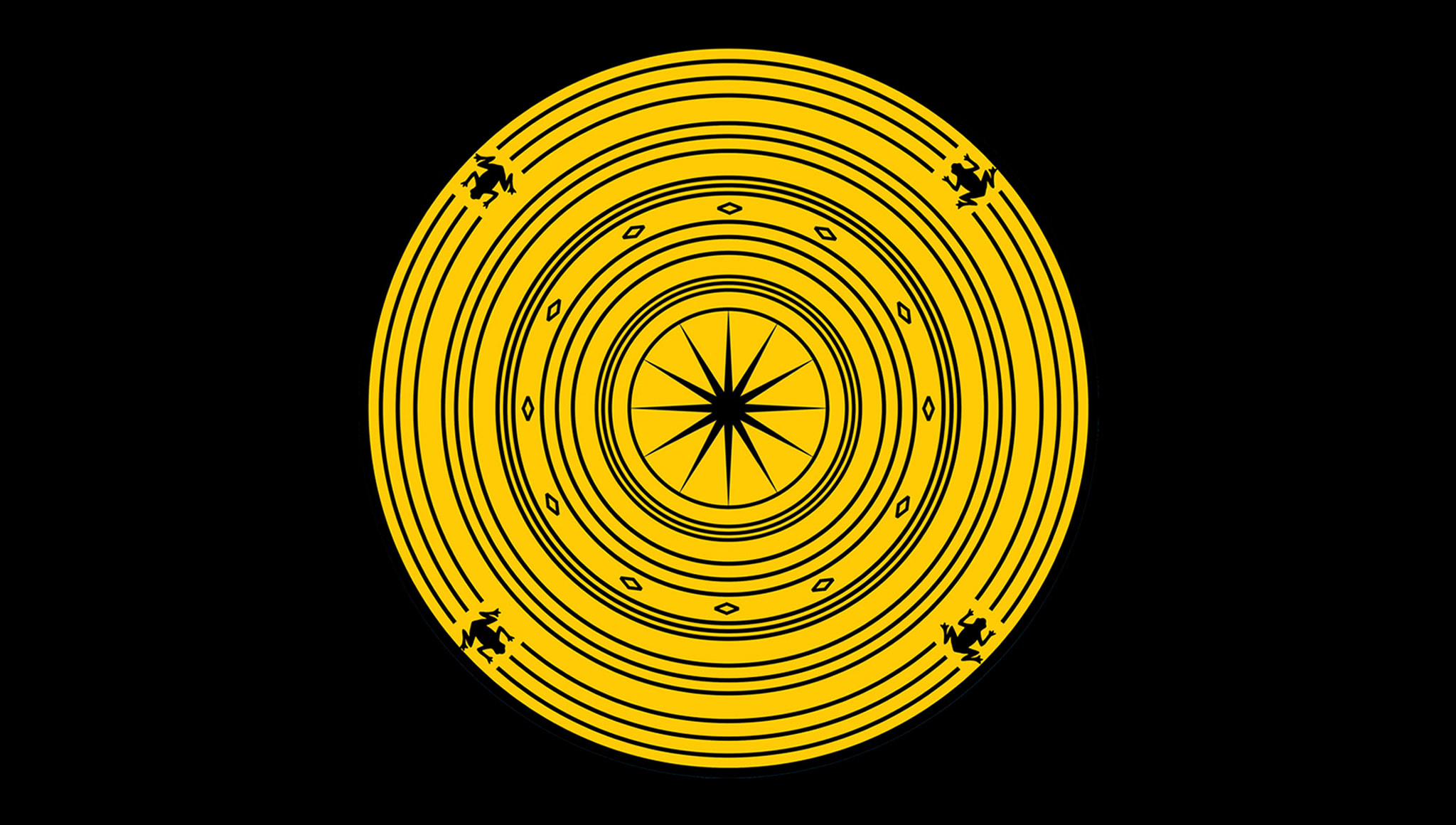
Flag of the Karenni Nationalities Defence Force

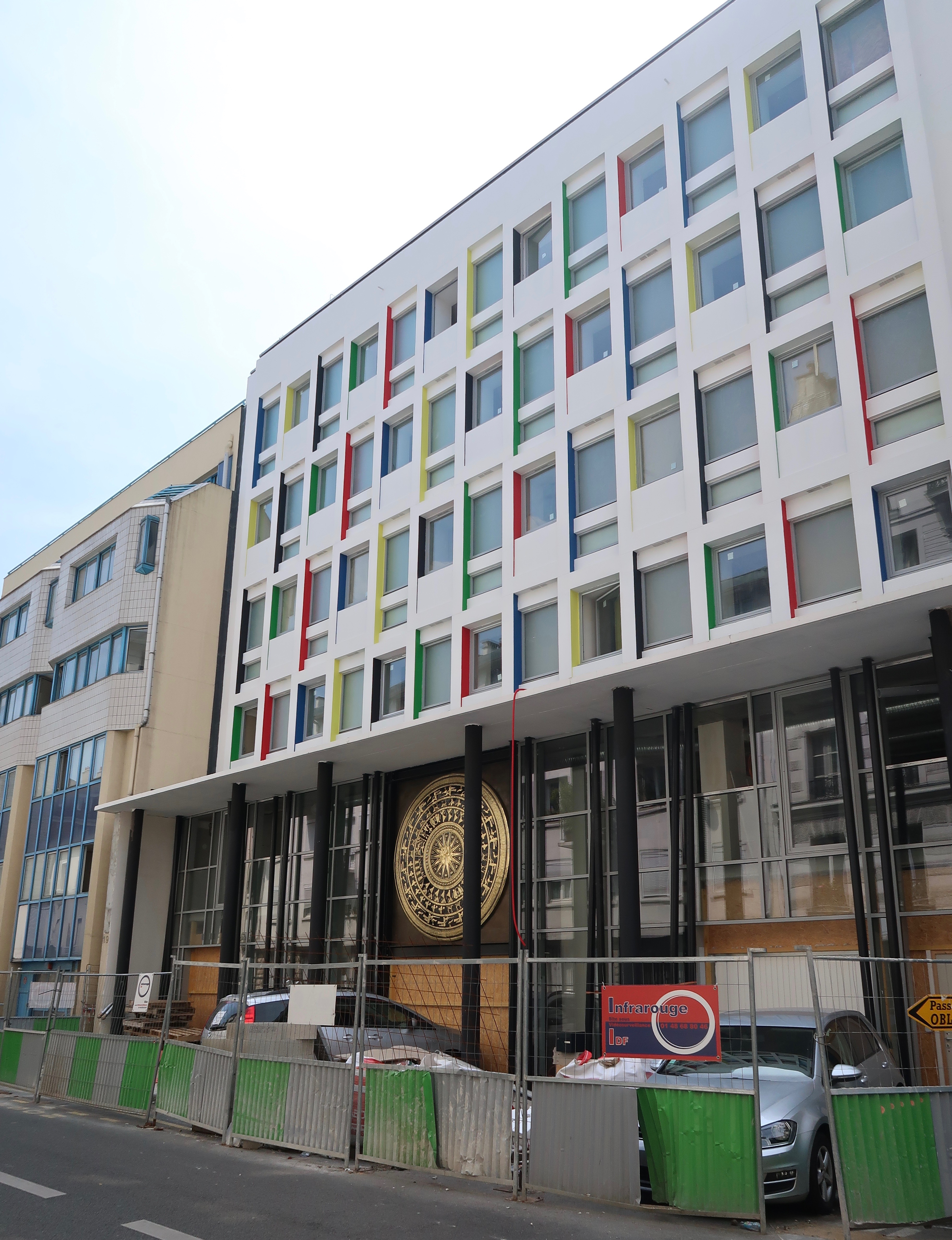
Bronze drum motif at the Vietnamese Cultural Center in Paris

== See also ==
- Đông Sơn culture
- Space of gong culture
