= Pejeng drum =

Type of ancient bronze kettledrum

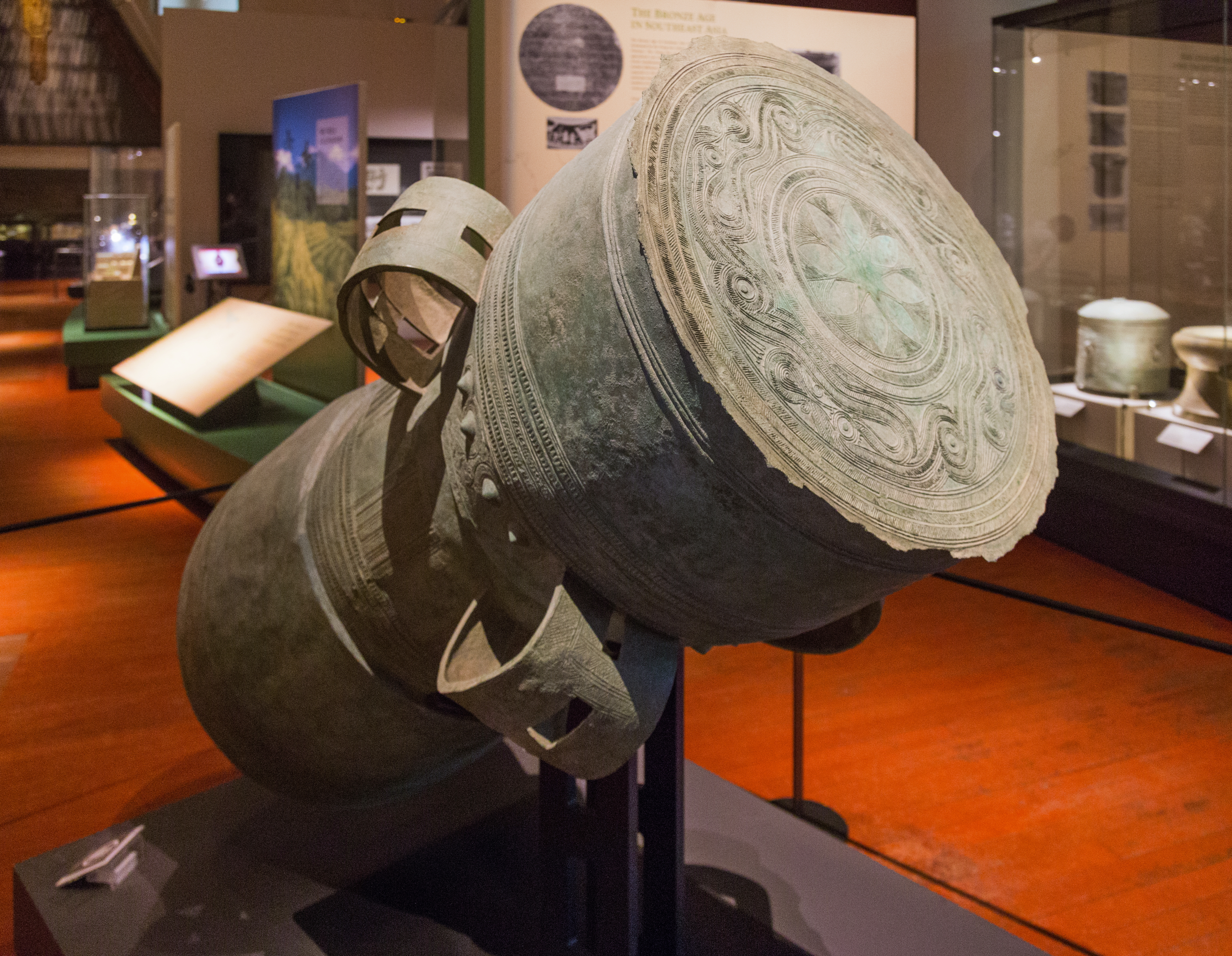
A pejeng drum discovered in East Java, displayed in the Asian Civilisations Museum, Singapore

Pejeng drum (also Pejeng-type drum) is a type of Bronze Age kettledrum which was produced across the archipelago of Indonesia between the 1st and 2nd century AD. They are one of Indonesia's finest example of metalworking. Examples of Bronze Age Pejeng drum, such as the ancient Moon of Pejeng, is the largest bronze drum in the world, indicating the advance of metal casting technique and the active trade in the archipelago in the first millennium AD.

== Archaeology ==
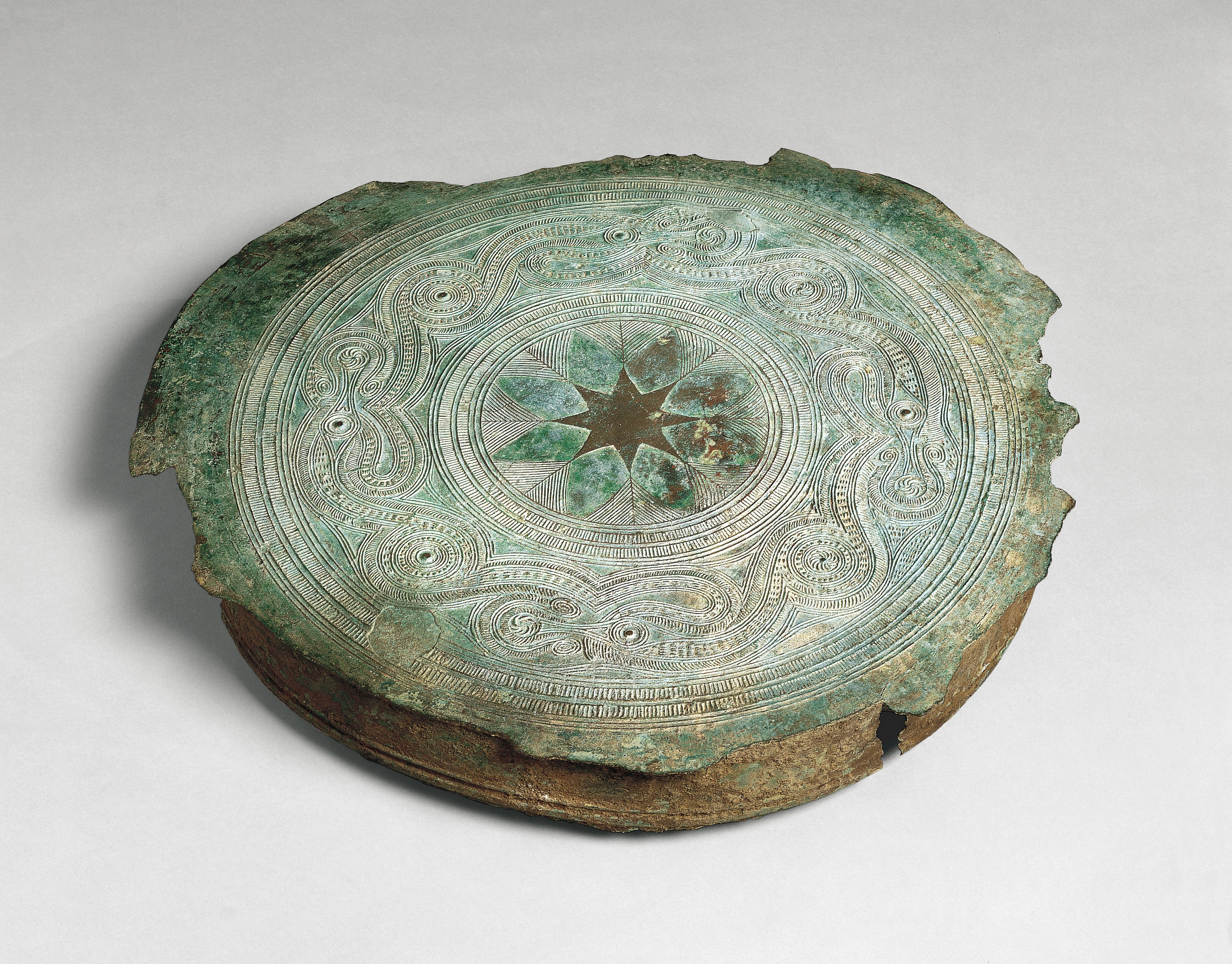
The separately-cast head (the tympanum) of a Pejeng-type drum found in Sumba

The first record of the use of bronze and iron in the Indonesian archipelago was around 500 BC. Most of the earliest bronze objects were probably used for ceremonies e.g. highly stylized axes and kettledrums. Some drums were shaped in a form known as the Dong Son, a type of bronze drum which originate from northern Vietnam and are spread along the Sunda Islands e.g. Sumatra, Java, Nusa Tenggara and even as far as the Kai Islands near Papua. The spread of the Dong Son drum in the Indonesian archipelago indicates an extensive trade among the kingdoms in Southeast Asia during the period. Other bronze drums found in the archipelago represented local variation, the most well-known of these are the Pejeng drums.

The Pejeng drums, named after the Bronze Age village of Pejeng in Bali, were the Indonesian variation of the Dong Son drum. Pejeng drums differ from the earlier Dong Son drum in that they had a more elongated shape and were made in two pieces (mantles and tympana) cast separately using the lost wax method. Pejeng drum was designed in the Indonesian archipelago and was produced extensively in the island of Java and Bali in the first millennium AD. The Balinese variation is among the most impressive metal artifact in the late prehistoric period of Indonesia. The Moon of Pejeng kept in the village of Pejeng, is the largest Pejeng drum in the world. Such enormous drum would have had great social value for the owners. Neither copper nor tin, the raw materials for bronze making, are available in Bali. The existence of huge bronze drums in Bali indicates an intensive inter-island trade between Bali and other parts of Indonesia during the first millennium AD. Trade was also more expansive in Bali, as pottery decorated with Indian-styled rouletted designs, were found at Sembiran and Pacung in the north part of Bali, indicating a trade as far as India within the archipelago in the 1st or 2nd centuries AD.

Pejeng drums may have been used as a regalia by kings or chiefs who wanted to be considered an international elite. At Plawangan, a Pejeng drum was found in burials, together with other precious objects e.g. gold necklace and iron spearhead. In Bali, the Moon of Pejeng, the largest drum of this type, was simply kept in villages. The Moko drum of Alor, a Pejeng-type drum, are still used as heirloom objects which are exchanged in marriage ceremonies.

== Appearance and construction ==
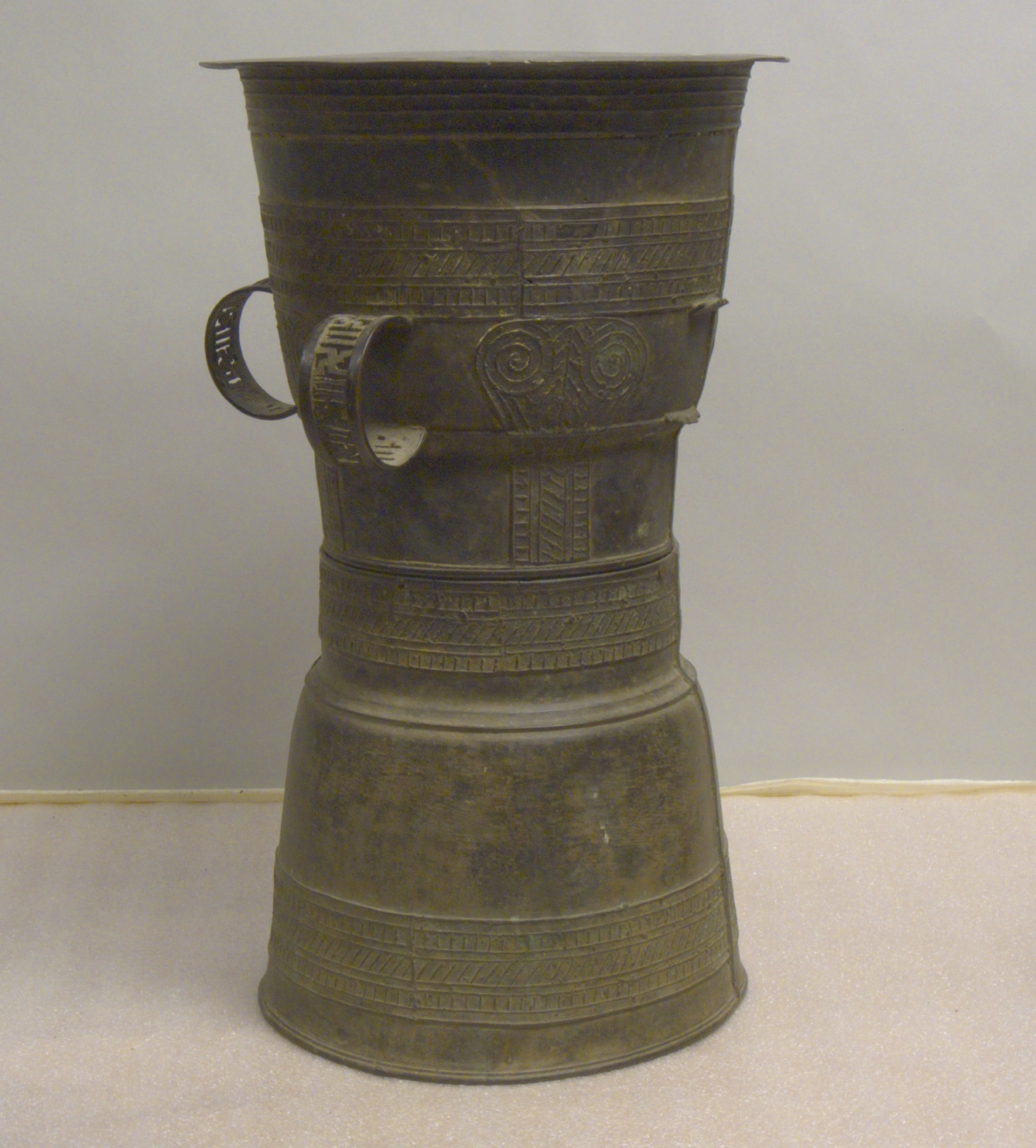
The Pejeng drum

A Pejeng drum has a symmetrical appearance. Its shape consists of three parts: the head or the tympanum at the top, the middle barrel where the handle is attached, and the base. The design difference between the Pejeng drum and the Dong Son drum is that the tympanum protrudes around 25 centimetres (9.8 in) beyond the body, and was cast separately from it.

Pejeng drums were made using lost-wax casting. Another difference with the Dong Son drum is that the body and tympana of the Pejeng drum were sometimes cast separately instead of as a whole. A wax model in the shape of a drum was made around a hollow clay core. The standardized geometric pattern of human or animal were impressed into the wax using incised stone molds. The geometric patterns were molded onto for the tympana and the upper sides.

== Cited works ==
- Bellwood, Peter (2001). "Ceremonial Bronzes of the Pre-Classic Era". In Miksic, John (ed.). Ancient History. Indonesian Heritage. Archipelago Press. ISBN 9813018267.
- I Wayan Ardika (2001). "Late Prehistoric Bali". In Miksic, John (ed.). Ancient History. Indonesian Heritage. Archipelago Press. ISBN 9813018267.
