= Tanglapui languages =

Pair of related languages spoken in Indonesia

Tanglapui
- Kolana–Tanglapui
- Geographic distribution: Alor Island
- Linguistic classification: Trans–New Guinea: West Bomberai; Timor–Alor–Pantar; Alor–Pantar; Alor; East; Tanglapui
- Subdivisions: Sawila; Kula

Language codes

The Tanglapui languages are a pair of closely related Papuan languages, Sawila and Kula, spoken on the island of Alor, which lies north of Timor in south east Indonesia. They have only marginal mutual intelligibility, and are ethnically distinct; nonetheless, the name 'Tanglapui' is used for either language.

== Sawila Phonology ==
=== Consonants ===
Sawila consonant phonemes
		Labial	Alveodental	Palatal	Velar	Glottal
Nasal		m	n		ŋ ⟨ng⟩	
Plosive	voiceless	p	t		k	ʔ ⟨'⟩
Plosive	voiced	b	d		ɡ	
Fricative			s			
Approximant		w		j ⟨y⟩		
Lateral			l			
Trill			r			

=== Vowels ===
Sawila vowel phonemes
	Front				Central		Back	
	unrounded		rounded		Central		Back	
	short	long	short	long	short	long	short	long
Close	i	iː ⟨ii⟩	y ⟨uy⟩	yː ⟨uyi⟩			u	uː ⟨uu⟩
Mid	e	eː ⟨ee⟩					o	oː ⟨oo⟩
Open					a	aː ⟨aa⟩		

== Kula Phonology ==
=== Consonants ===
Consonant phonemes
		Labial	Alveolar	Palatal	Velar	
		Labial	Alveolar	Palatal	plain	labial
Nasal		m	n		ŋ ⟨ng⟩	
Plosive	voiceless	p	t		k	(kʷ) ⟨kw⟩
Plosive	voiced	b	d		g	(gʷ) ⟨gw⟩
Affricate				(d͡ʒ) ⟨j⟩		
Fricative		(β) ⟨w⟩	s			
Liquid	trill		(r)			
Liquid	lateral		l			
Semivowel				j ⟨y⟩		w

=== Vowels ===
	Front	Central	Back
High	i		u
High	ɪ ⟨í⟩		
Mid	e		o
Low		ɐ ⟨á⟩	
Low		a	
