= Sawila language =

Alor language spoken in Indonesia

Sawila
- Native to: Indonesia
- Region: Alor Island
- Native speakers: 3,000 (2014)
- Language family: Trans–New Guinea ?: West Bomberai ?; Timor–Alor–Pantar; Alor–Pantar; Alor; East; Tanglapui; Sawila

Language codes
- ISO 639-3: swt
- Glottolog: sawi1256
- ELP: Sawila

Sawila, or Tanglapui, is a Papuan language of the Alor archipelago. Dialects are Sawila proper, Lona, Salimana, Lalamana, Sileba. Sawila speakers refer to their language as Manata.

== Phonology ==
Sawila consonant phonemes
| | | Labial | Alveodental | Palatal | Velar | Glottal |
|---|---|---|---|---|---|---|
| Nasal | | m | n | | ŋ ⟨ng⟩ | |
| Plosive | voiceless | p | t | | k | ʔ ⟨'⟩ |
| Plosive | voiced | b | d | | ɡ | |
| Fricative | | | s | | | |
| Approximant | | w | | j ⟨y⟩ | | |
| Lateral | | | l | | | |
| Trill | | | r | | | |

Sawila vowel phonemes
| | Front | | | | Central | | Back | |
| | unrounded | | rounded | | Central | | Back | |
| | short | long | short | long | short | long | short | long |
|---|---|---|---|---|---|---|---|---|
| Close | i | iː ⟨ii⟩ | y ⟨uy⟩ | yː ⟨uyi⟩ | | | u | uː ⟨uu⟩ |
| Mid | e | eː ⟨ee⟩ | | | | | o | oː ⟨oo⟩ |
| Open | | | | | a | aː ⟨aa⟩ | | |
