= Kula language =

Language spoken in Indonesia

Kula
- Tanglapui
- Native to: Indonesia
- Region: Alor Island
- Native speakers: (5,000 cited 1997)
- Language family: Trans–New Guinea ?: West Bomberai ?; Timor–Alor–Pantar; Alor–Pantar; Alor; East; Tanglapui; Kula
- Dialects: Arumaka; Iramang; Kulatela; Kula Watena; Larena; Nuclear Kula; Sumang; Watena

Language codes
- ISO 639-3: tpg
- Glottolog: kula1280
- ELP: Kula

Kula (Kola) or Lamtoka (Lantoka), also known as Tanglapui, is a Papuan language spoken in villages on the north coast, south coast and mountainous interior of Alor Island in Indonesia. Dialects are Kula proper, Kulatela, Watena, Kula Watena, Iramang, Larena, Sumang, and Arumaka. Most settlements where Kula is spoken are "new villages" that have only been inhabited since the 1960s. Due to this recent resettlement, and since usage of the language is discouraged in schools, Kula is an endangered language.

== Phonology ==
The data in this section are taken from Williams (2017). Phonemes in brackets are "marginal phonemes".

=== Consonants ===
Consonant phonemes
		Labial	Alveolar	Palatal	Velar	
		Labial	Alveolar	Palatal	plain	labial
Nasal		m	n		ŋ ⟨ng⟩	
Plosive	voiceless	p	t		k	(kʷ) ⟨kw⟩
Plosive	voiced	b	d		g	(gʷ) ⟨gw⟩
Affricate				(d͡ʒ) ⟨j⟩		
Fricative		(β) ⟨w⟩	s			
Liquid	trill		(r)			
Liquid	lateral		l			
Semivowel				j ⟨y⟩		w

=== Vowels ===
	Front	Central	Back
High	i		u
High	ɪ ⟨í⟩		
Mid	e		o
Low		ɐ ⟨á⟩	
Low		a	
