= Ngoc Lu drum =

The Ngoc Lu drum is regarded as one of the most important and prominent artifacts of the Dong Son culture of the Bronze Age, a civilisation that flourished in around the 2nd to 3rd century BC in the Red River Delta of Vietnam. The high level of importance placed on it by historians and archaeologists is due to its well preserved and richly decorated nature. The Ngoc Lu drum is the first artifact on the list of 30 items recognised as National Treasures of Vietnam for the first time in 2012.

Ngoc Lu bronze drum's surface, Vietnam

== Discovery ==
The drum was accidentally discovered in 1893 in Hà Nam Province, southeast of Hanoi, by workers building a dike, rather than during a planned expedition. The drum was named after the Confucian name of the village where it was found, Ngọc Lũ (Sino-Vietnamese 玉缕, vernacular tên chữ name Làng Chủ) in Bình Lục District.

== The drum ==
In contrast to most other drums of the Dong Son, the tympanum bears three concentric panels, which depict animals or humans, interleaved with bands of geometric or circular patterns. The innermost panel appears to be a self-referencing depiction, as it is decorated with pictures of humans who appear to be performing a ceremony involving the drums themselves. Other musical instruments and rice growing and harvesting activities are also shown. The two outer panels are decorated with scenes of deer, hornbills and crane egrets.

The inner panel repeats itself, despite the presence of minor variations. The scenes are the subject of multiple interpretations, but a prominent motif is that of a row of figures who appear to be male. They are plumed, and led by a man holding a spear that is directed towards the ground. He is followed in the line by five more men, at least two of whom appear to playing musical instruments. One appears to be playing a khen and either cymbals or bells, while another holds a wand-like object in his left hand. The men are wearing a type of kilt and highly feathered headgear, which includes a figure in the shape of a bird's head.

Ngoc Lu bronze drum's surface (Image), Vietnam

Ahead of the leader, there is some sort of a structure that is supported by stilts with either decorated timber walls or some sort of streamers held at the eaves. A board of gongs is being percussed by a person wearing a kilt, but is not wearing a feathered headdress. Three people depicted beyond the house also do not have any headwear, with two having long hair and another with bun-tied hair. Two of the people are depicted threshing rice with a pole ornamented with feathers, while the other is shooing away a hornbill. A house is depicted beyond them which has decorated posts erected at a sharp angle, close to vertical, which is decorated with what appears to be feathers or streamers. The ends of the gables are further decorated with birds' heads. There are three people depicted inside the house, possibly playing percussion instruments.

There is also a scene where one standing person and three seated people are brandishing long poles that appear to be used to strike a row of drums placed in front of them. This scene is repeated with a few variations. In one scene the drums are all of identical size, while in the others their sizes are sequenced. One percussionist uses one striking device, while another uses two for each hand. There are further variations of this scene with seated and standing percussionists.

Archaeologists are agreed that the scene is likely to depict a festival or ritual of some kind, with the musicians appearing to be part of a parade. The feathered men contrast with those depicted in the house, who have unkempt hair and appear to be female. The decoration on the mantle of the drum depicts plumed warriors in a procession of elegant pirogues with decorated timbers. Birds' heads are found on their headgear, the ends of their water transport vessels and even the rudder.
