= Dong Son drum =

Ancient Vietnamese bronze drum

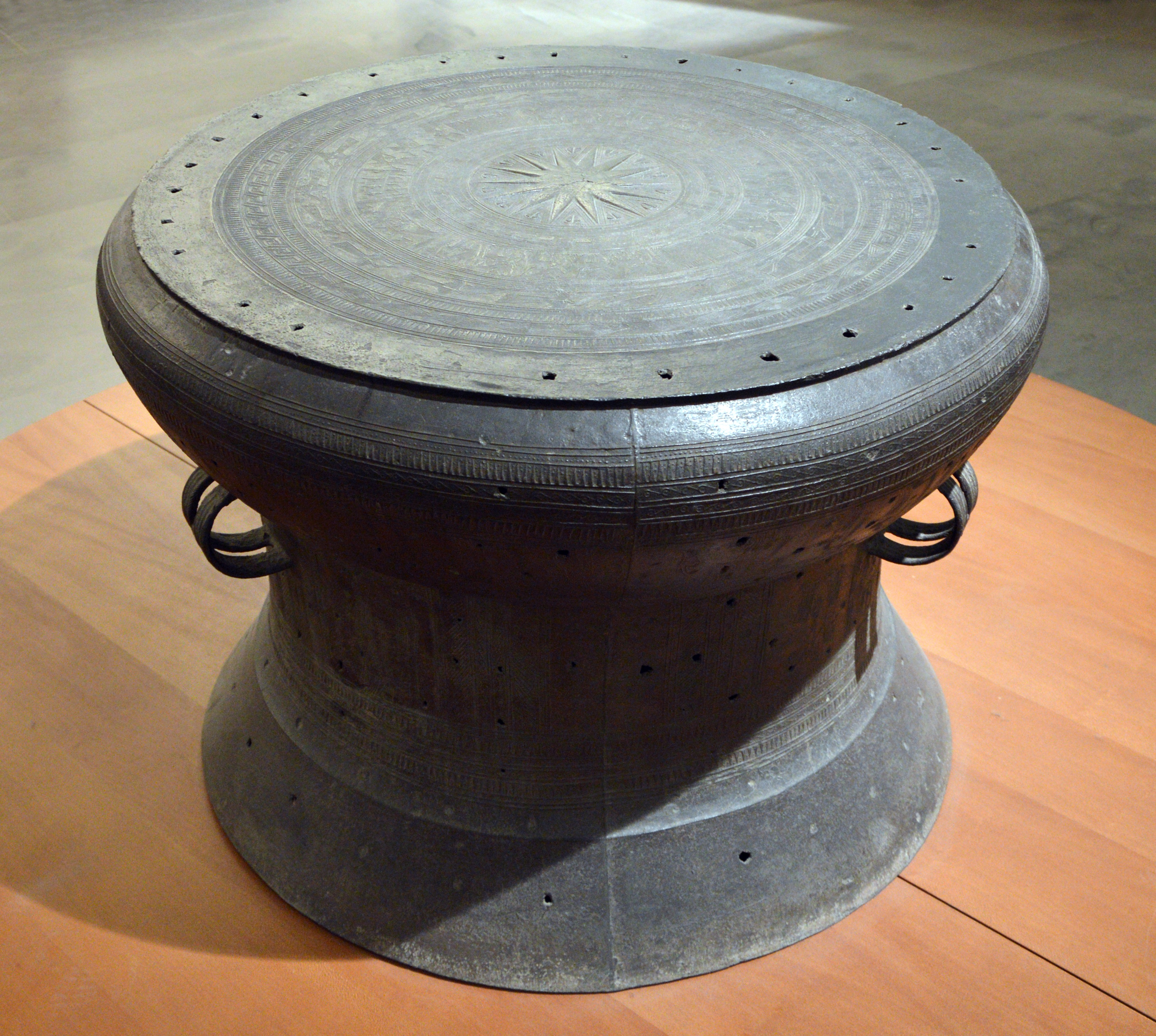
Drum from Sông Đà, Vietnam. Đông Sơn II culture. Mid-1st millennium BCE. Bronze.

A Đông Sơn drum (Vietnamese: Trống đồng Đông Sơn, lit. 'Bronze drum of Đông Sơn'; also called Heger Type I drum) is a type of ancient bronze drum created by the Đông Sơn culture that existed in the Red River Delta. The drums were produced from about 600 BCE or earlier until the third century CE; they are one of the culture's most astounding examples of ancient metalworking. The drums, cast in bronze using the lost-wax casting method are up to a meter in height and weigh up to 100 kilograms (220 lb). Đông Sơn drums were apparently both musical instruments and objects of worship.

They are decorated with geometric patterns, scenes of daily life, agriculture, war, animals and birds, and boats. The latter alludes to the importance of trade to the culture in which they were made, and the drums themselves became objects of trade and heirlooms. One of the recurring pattern is the Lạc bird found in the second outer ring and also in the symbolism of Mo (religion). More than 200 have been found, across an area from eastern Indonesia to Vietnam and parts of Southern China.

The display on the surface of the Đông Sơn drums are often depicted across many cultural institutes of Vietnam, one being displayed in Vietnam parliamentary office during some of Vietnam's ASEAN summits.

== History ==
Sites of Đông Sơn type drum findings

According to ancient history, bronze drums were first mentioned in Shi Ben and Book of the Later Han which said Ma Yuan melted the bronze drums seized from the Lạc Việt in Jiaozhi to make bronze horses.

Bronze drums were venerated as cult objects in ancient Vietnam. Excavated bronze drums were worshipped as Thần Đồng Cổ (bronze drum god) in several temples such as the Đông Cổ Temple and the Cao Sơn Temple. Ngoc Lu drum was found in 1893 in Hà Nam Province. Đông Sơn drums along with bronzewares were excavated in 1924 in Đông Sơn village, Thanh Hóa province, Vietnam.

In 1902, a collection of 165 large bronze drums was published by F. Heger, who subdivided them into a classification of four types. Higham, Charles (1996). The Bronze Age of Southeast Asia. Cambridge World Archaeology. ISBN 0-521-56505-7. Chinese archaeologist classified Heger I drums into bigger and heavier Yue drums including the Đông Sơn drums, and the Dian drums, into eight subtypes.

The discovery of Đông Sơn drums in New Guinea, is seen as proof of trade connections – spanning at least the past thousand years – between this region and the societies of Java and China.

== Appearances ==
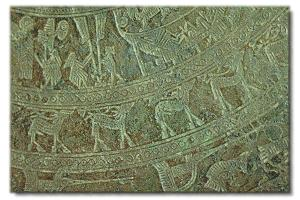
Image on the Ngọc Lũ bronze drum's surface, Vietnam

The drums have a symmetrical appearance with three parts:

- the barrel (upper body)
- the head (top part)
- the leg (bottom part)

The patterns on drums bear a realistic style and show stilted houses, dancing people, people pounding rice, beating drums and sailing, together with animal and birds. The scenes depict daily life of ancient Việt and reflect the artistic talent and mind. The drums were used as musical instruments in festivals, such as prayers for rain, for good harvest and rituals, such as weddings and funerals, as well as command in army. They were also used as funerary objects and symbol of power of tribe leaders.

== Classification ==
The Heger 1 drums of the Đông Sơn culture were classified and divided into five groups by the Vietnamese scholar Pham Huy Thong in 1990, a division that implied a chronological succession. The earliest, group A, comprises a set of large and intricated decorated drums. Group B consists of a smaller drums which almost universally have a group of waterbirds in flight as their key motif on the tympanum and the mantle designs. Group C has a central panel on the tympanum made up of a row of plumed warriors placed inside another panel of waterbirds in flight. Toads line the tympanum's edge while the mantle was decorated with either patterns involving boats or geometric patterns.

== Notable drums ==
=== Ngọc Lũ ===
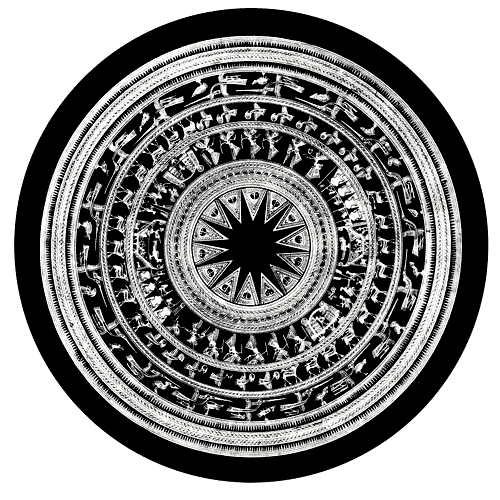
Ngọc Lũ bronze drum's surface, Vietnam

The Ngọc Lũ drum is regarded as the most important of the Đông Sơn drums. The drum was accidentally discovered in 1893 in Hà Nam Province, southeast of Hanoi, rather than during a planned expedition. In contrast to most other drums of the Dong Son, the drumhead bears three concentric panels depicting animals or humans interleaved with bands of geometric or circular patterns. The innermost panel appears to be a self-referencing depiction, as it is decorated with pictures of humans who appear to be performing a ceremony involving the drums themselves. Other musical instruments and rice growing and harvesting activities are also shown. The two outer panels are decorated with scenes of deer, hornbills and crane egrets.

=== Hoàng Hạ ===
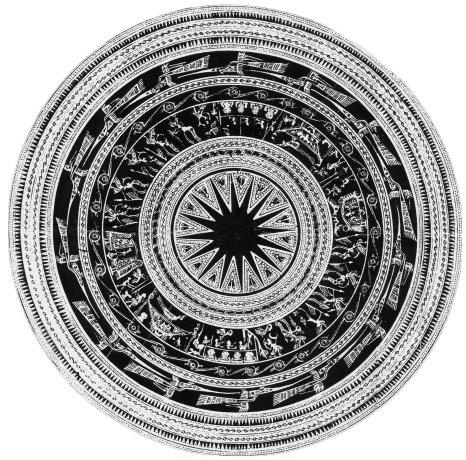
Hoàng Ha bronze drum's surface, Vietnam

The Hoàng Hạ drum is a notable Đông Sơn drum. It was discovered in Hòa Bình Province in 1937 near the village of Hoàng Ha, with an outer panel of crane egrets and an inner panel which shows a procession similar to that described in the Ngọc Lũ drum, the most famous of the Đông Sơn drums. It depicts four feathered men are depicted walking in a line, brandishing spears, with two musicians in tow. A person is depicted standing under the eaves of a house, beating a drum while the rice fields are unattended, allowing a bird to eat the rice that was intended for threshing. The boats depicted on the mantle of the drum are very similar, with an analogous cleft prow, archer standing on raised platform and a drum. However, the drum is different from the Ngọc Lũ drum in that the animal is absent.

=== Cổ Loa ===
Cổ Loa drum's surface, Vietnam

The Cổ Loa drum is a notable specimen showing a procession similar to that described in the Ngọc Lũ drum. The drum only has two warriors with spears, in contrast to that of the Ngọc Lũ drum. Another difference is that the ensemble of percussionists consists of three drummers, with one drum lying under the eaves of the house. Meanwhile, an extra person is depicted in the rice threshing process. The person has long hair and is winnowing grain into a bowl. The percussion ensemble is also depicted differently in that the drummers are not all drumming in synchronisation. Two of the drummers are depicted making contact with the drum, while the other two drummers have their batons in the raised position.

=== Sông Đà ===
The Sông Đà drum is a notable specimen discovered in Ha Son Binh in the 19th century. The drum shows a procession similar to that described in the Ngọc Lũ drum. This drum varies in that it depicts four sets of men in procession with feathered headgear, rather than two. Also, each set comprises three or four people none of whom appear to be armed. The posture of the men was interpreted as that they were participating in a dance rather than a military ceremony. In this drum, only one pair of people are depicted as threshing rice, and there is no cymbal player. However, the general motifs, such as the boats on the mantle, remain in place.

=== Others ===
The Quang Xuong drum from Thanh Hóa Province is another specimen, which is believed to be possibly later in origin. However, the drum is smaller and the images are harder to interpret.

Large drums found in northern Vietnam were generally in the minority, as most drums have simple decorations with fewer representations of people. The Ban Thom drum has only an inner panel with four houses and plumed humans standing alone or in couples.

== See also ==
- Li Lao drum
- Pejeng drum
