= Đông Sơn culture =

Archaeological culture of Vietnam

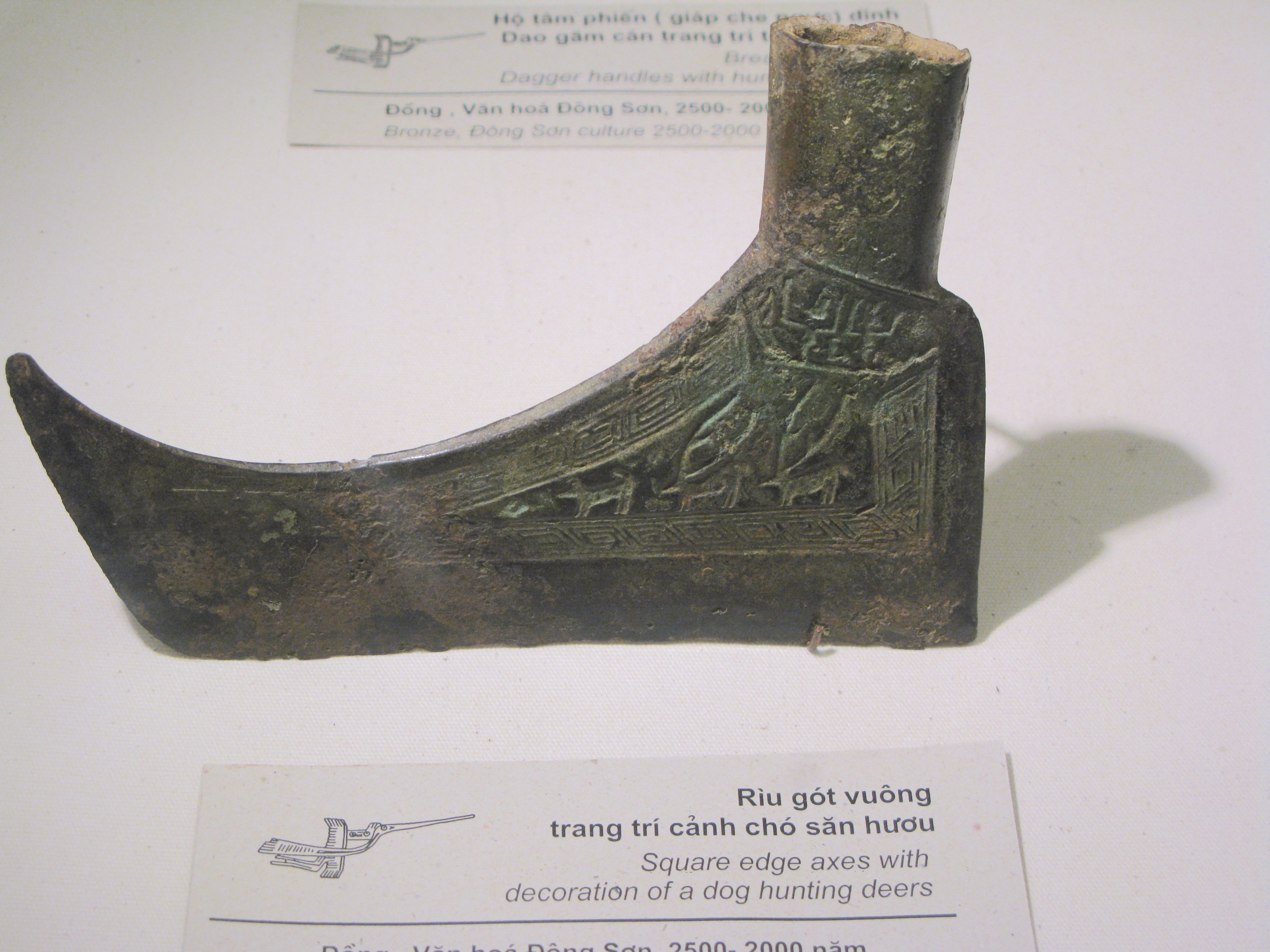
A Đông Sơn axe

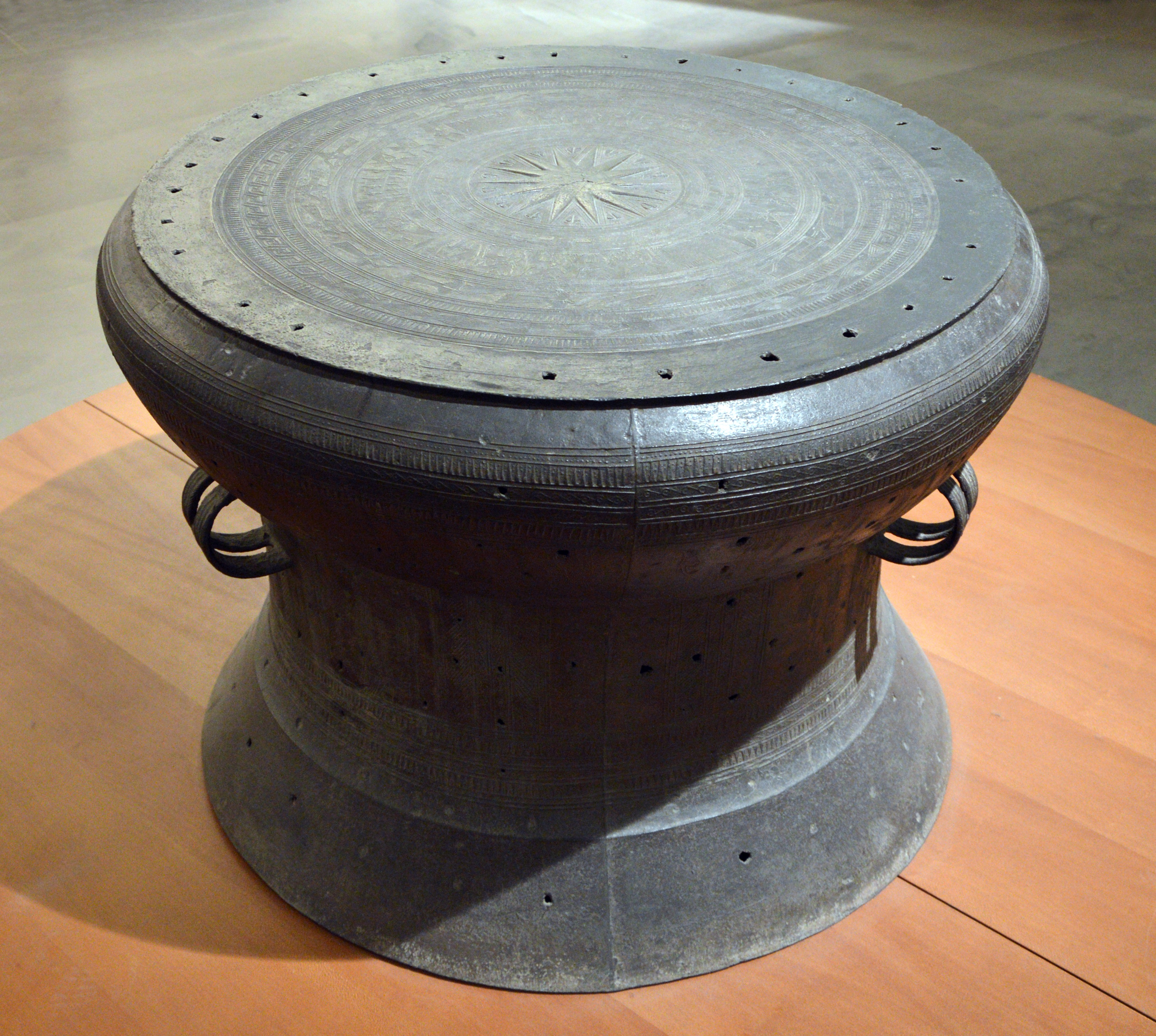
Dong Son drum from Sông Đà, Mường Lay, Vietnam. Dong Son II culture. Mid-1st millennium BC. Bronze.

The Đông Sơn culture, Dongsonian culture, or the Lạc Việt culture (named for modern village Đông Sơn, a village in Thanh Hóa, Vietnam) was a Bronze Age material centered on the Red River Delta in northern Vietnam. Archaeological artifacts closely related to the Đông Sơn or believed to be Đông Sơn have also been found in other parts of Southeast Asia and China such as Malaysia, Laos, and the Chinese provinces of Yunnan, Guangxi, Fujian from 1000 BC until the first century AD. Vietnamese historians attribute the culture to the states of Văn Lang and Âu Lạc and its influence spread to other parts of Southeast Asia, including Maritime Southeast Asia, from about 1000 BC to 1 BC.

The Đông Sơn people were skilled at cultivating rice, keeping water buffalos and pigs, fishing and sailing in long dugout canoes. They also were skilled bronze casters, which is evidenced by the Dong Son drum found widely throughout northern Vietnam and Yunnan and Guangxi in China.

== Definition ==
The Đông Sơn ("East Mountain") archaeological culture is named after the bronze Đông Sơn drums, archaeological items first excavated in Thanh Hóa province, Vietnam, by M. Pajot in 1924. These bronze kettledrums excavated in Thanh Hóa are classified as Heger I type drums and can be found in northern Vietnam and as well as the Chinese provinces of Yunnan and Guangxi. Heger I drums are identified by intricate decorations consisting of scenes depicting rings of warships and warriors in feather headdresses orbiting around a sun in the center, upon which rest models of stylized frogs. Đông Sơn has also been used as a catch-all term for bronze kettledrums from other places in southern China and Southeast Asia such as the Heger II type drums, also known as Li Lao drums. The Heger II drums share some elements of the Heger I drums such as the frogs and radiating sun motif but are decorated in a much plainer style and are much bigger in size. There are also similarities between Heger II and Heger I type drums that are not shared between Heger I and II drums from different locations. The Heger I and II drums from Guangxi and Yunnan have lower lead content than other Heger I and II drums from the Red River Plain and Li-Lao regions, suggesting a diffusion model from the Red River Plain. According to the Lịch Sử Cổ Đại Việt Nam, the high lead content of the Đông Sơn is what differentiates it from Chinese bronzes. Pottery and bronze artifacts with a similar art style have also been excavated in Thailand which may predate the Đông Sơn culture, possibly indicating that the ancestor of the Đông Sơn culture was present in Vietnam and neighboring areas by the 4th to 5th millennium BC.

Some consider many different types of bronze drums such as the Heger II drums to be Đông Sơn while others consider only the Heger I type drums to be Đông Sơn. The close relationship between the Đông Sơn culture and the Dian culture in Yunnan have led some to believe that they are variants of one culture. According to Alice Yao, both the Đông Sơn and Dian cultures were part of the same material phenomenon represented by over 250 bronze drums excavated in the two regions and differ in name only due to the nationality of the archaeologist.

== History of discovery ==
The excavations at Đông Sơn village started in 1924 after a fisherman named Nguyễn Văn Lắm reported to École française d'Extrême-Orient in Hanoi that he had encountered some large quantities of bronze artifacts. However, scattered Dong Son bronze antique were claimed to be rediscovered as early as the Lý dynasty (1010–1225), and later, Austrian archaeologist Franz Heger in 1898, who created a classification of bronze drums. The first mention of bronze drums in literary works can be found in the third century BCE Chinese text Shiben.

== Identity ==
The Dongsonians spoke either Austroasiatic or Northern Tai languages; or were Austroasiatic-speakers with significant contact and admixture with Tai-speakers.

Archaeogenetics have demonstrated that before the Đông Sơn period, the Red River Delta's inhabitants were predominantly Austroasiatic. Genetic data from Vietnam's Phùng Nguyên culture's Mán Bạc burial site demonstrated close proximity to modern Austroasiatic speakers such as the Khmer and Mlabri; meanwhile, "mixed genetics" from Đông Sơn culture's Núi Nấp site showed affinity to "Dai from China, Tai-Kadai speakers from Thailand, and Austroasiatic speakers from Vietnam, including the Kinh". One study argues that Núi Nấp populations also have affinities with the Dushan and Baojianshan samples in Guangxi and that they can be modeled as a mixture of Dushan-related (~65%) and northern East Asian-related (~35%) ancestry. A 2010 craniometric study argued that the cranial features, including narrow and long faces, relatively flat glabellas and nasal roots, and round orbits, are due to shared genetic ancestry with their neighbors in the northern peripheral areas of Vietnam, including southern China. A number of Đông Sơn drums, including the Ngoc Lu drum, depict musician figures playing what appears to be the khene, an instrument closely associated with Lao speakers.

Ferlus (2009) showed that the inventions of pestle, oar, and a pan to cook sticky rice, which is the main characteristic of the Đông Sơn culture, correspond to the creation of new lexicons for these inventions in Northern Vietic (Việt–Mường) and Central Vietic (Cuoi-Toum). The new vocabularies to denote these inventions were proven to be derivatives from original verbs rather than borrowed lexical items. The current distribution of Northern Vietic also correspond to the area of Đông Sơn culture. Thus, Ferlus conclude that the Dongsonian culture was of Vietic origin and they were the direct ancestors of modern Vietnamese people.

Some historians such as Keith W. Taylor, Nguyen Phuong, and John D. Phan believe there is no actual evidence that the Đông Sơn culture or figures were Vietnamese people or ancestors of the Vietnamese. Phan notes that artifacts consistent with the Đông Sơn culture could be found in places such as Malaysia and Fujian, China, and probably represents several distinct ethnolinguistic groups who traded with each other. Some studies show the highest affinities between modern Vietnamese populations and Hon Hai Co Tien and Kinabatagan populations, except for Vietnamese Austronesian populations. However, Hoabinhian affinities are not found in Kinabatagan populations compared to Hon Hai Co Tien populations.

== Origins ==
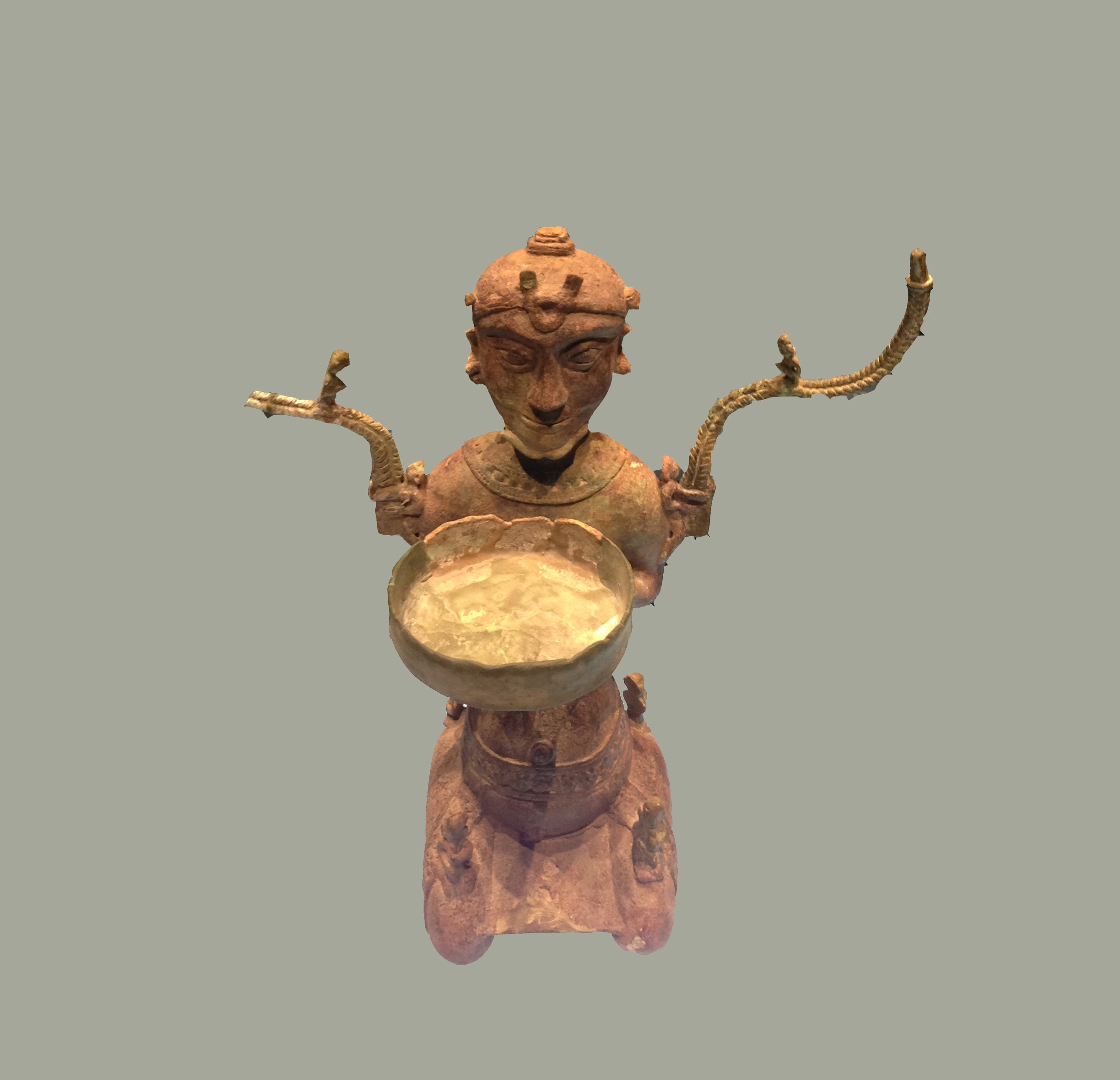
Bronze lamp figurine, Đông Sơn culture, known as the "Kneeling Man)

The origins of Đông Sơn culture may be traced back to ancient bronze castings. Scholars traditionally traced the origins of bronze-casting technology to China but during the 1970s archaeological discoveries in Isan, Thailand found that the casting of bronze either began in Southeast Asia first then spread into China, or that it developed the practise independently from China. The Đông Sơn bronze industry therefore has a local origin in Southeast Asia rather than being introduced by migrations out of China. The Gò Mun culture gave rise to the Đông Sơn culture; the Đông Sơn was the culmination of the Bronze Age and the opening stage of the Iron Age.

The bronze drums were used for war, "the chief summons the warriors of the tribe by beating the drum", when mourning, and during feasts. "The scenes cast onto the drums would inform us that the Dong Son leaders had access to bronze founders of remarkable skill." Lost-wax casting was based on Chinese founders, but the scenes are local, including drummers and other musicians, warriors, rice processing, birds, deer, war vessels, and geometric designs.

The bronze drums were made in significant proportions in northern Vietnam, Laos and parts of Yunnan. The Đông Sơn bronze drums exhibit "remarkable skill". The Cổ Loa drum weighs 72 kilograms (159 lb) and would have required the smelting of between 1 and 7 tonnes (1.1 and 7.7 tons) of copper ore.

Displays of the Đông Sơn drum surface can be seen in some of Vietnam's cultural institutions.

Some of Đông Sơn bronze daggers closely resemble Scytho-Siberian styles.

== Disappearance ==
The disappearance of material evidence of the Đông Sơn culture such as the Đông Sơn drums in Vietnam dates to the Trưng sisters' defeat and the appearance of Han material culture, suggesting that the Trưng sisters represented a failed indigenous uprising. After the Han general Ma Yuan's conquest of the Red River Plain, the Đông Sơn bronze drum culture disappeared. According to Michael Churchman, more than 120 Han brick tombs in the Red River region suggest growing Chinese migration into the area or significant cultural influence on the locals by these immigrants. The earliest Sino-Vietnamese loanwords also date from around this time.

== See also ==
- Lạc Việt
- Dong Son drum
- Nanyue
- Âu Lạc
- Baiyue
- Dian kingdom
