= Languages in censuses =

Many countries, through the use of censuses, enumerate their populations by languages and by their level of competence in using those languages.

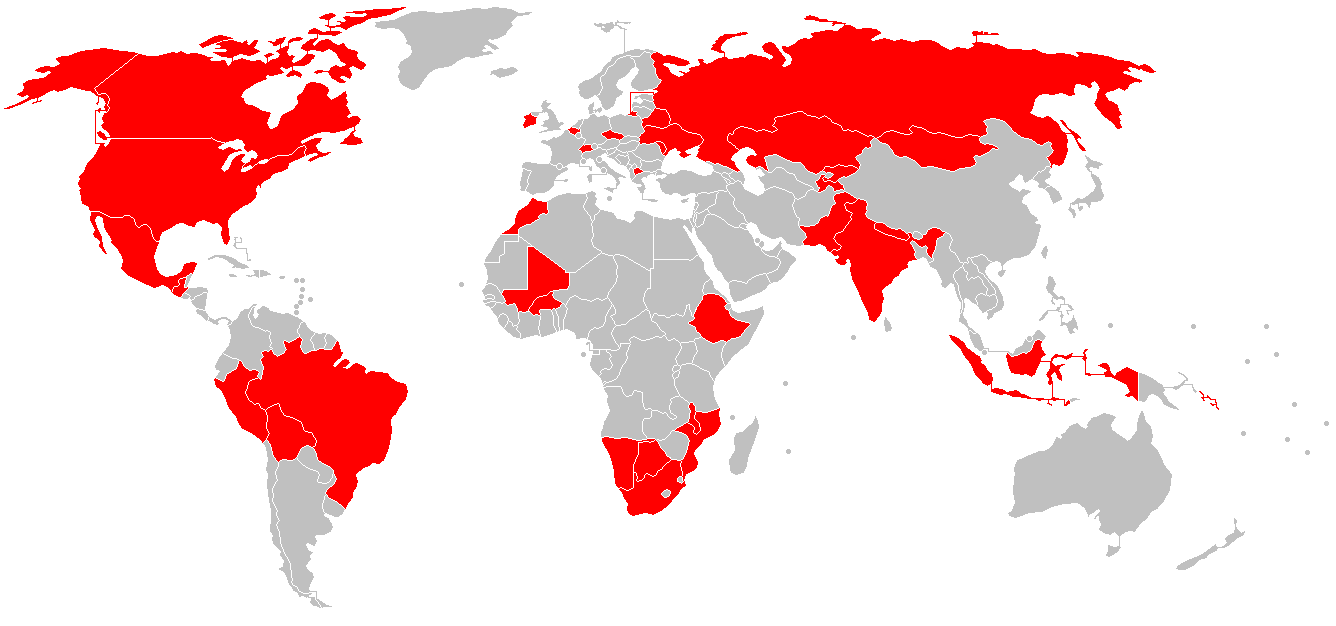
Languages in censuses. Map showing countries where the languages of people was enumerated at least in one census since 1991.

== Afghanistan ==
Pashto and Dari (Persian) are the official languages of Afghanistan; bilingualism is very common. Both are Indo-European languages from the Iranian languages sub-family. Dari has always been the prestige language and a lingua franca for inter-ethnic communication. It is the native tongue of the Tajiks, Hazaras, Aimaks, and Kizilbash. Pashto is the native tongue of the Pashtuns, although many Pashtuns often use Dari and some non-Pashtuns are fluent in Pashto.

Other languages, including Uzbek, Arabic, Turkmen, Balochi, Pashayi, and Nuristani languages (Ashkunu, Kamkata-viri, Vasi-vari, Tregami, and Kalasha-ala), are the native tongues of minority groups across the country and have official status in the regions where they are widely spoken. Minor languages also include Pamiri (Shughni, Munji, Ishkashimi, and Wakhi), Brahui, Hindko, and Kyrgyz. A small percentage of Afghans are also fluent in Urdu, English and other languages.

Language	World Factbook / Library of Congress Country Studies estimate
Dari	50%
Pashto	35%
Uzbek and Turkmen	11%
30 minor languages	4%

== Albania ==
Language	People
Albanian	2,800,139
Greek	15,196
Macedonian	4,443
Roma	4,025
Aromanian	3,848
Turkish	714
Italian	523
Serbo-Croatian	66
Others	187
Not relevant/not stated	3,843

== Algeria ==
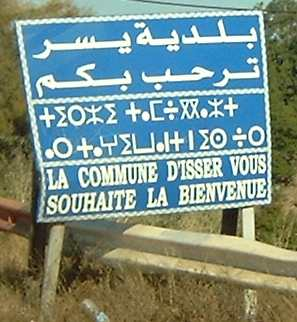
Trilingual welcome sign in Isser Municipality, (Boumerdès) written in Arabic, Kabyle (Tifinagh script), and French. ("The municipality of Isser welcomes you.")

The official language of Algeria is Modern Standard Arabic (literary Arabic), as specified in its constitution since 1963. In addition to this, Berber has been recognized as a "national language" by constitutional amendment since 8 May 2002. Algerian Arabic and Berber are the native languages of over 99% of Algerians, with Algerian Arabic spoken by about 72% and Berber by 27.4%. French, though it has no official status, is widely used in government, culture, media (newspapers) and education (from primary school), due to Algeria's colonial history and can be regarded as being a de facto co-official language of Algeria. Kabyle, the most spoken Berber language in the country, is taught and partially co-official (with a few restrictions) in parts of Kabylie.

== Andorra ==
Official language is Catalan, although the most spoken language is Spanish. Other minority languages are French and Portuguese.

== Antigua and Barbuda ==
The de facto official language is English, while Antiguan Creole is dissuaded from use. Around 10,000 inhabitants speak Spanish.

== Argentina ==
Dialectal variants of the Spanish language in Argentina

The de facto (Note: Though not declared official de jure, the Spanish language is the only one used in the wording of laws, decrees, resolutions, official documents and public acts.) official language is Spanish, spoken by almost all Argentines. Due to the extensive Argentine geography, Spanish has a strong variation among regions, although the prevalent dialect is Rioplatense, primarily spoken in the La Plata Basin and accented similarly to Neapolitan language.

There are several second-languages in widespread use among the Argentine population:

- English, (Note: English is also the primary language of the disputed Falkland Islands.) taught since elementary school. 42.3% of Argentines claim to speak it, with 15.4% of them claiming to have a high level of language comprehension.
- Italian, by 1.5 million people. (Note: Many elder people also speak a macaronic language of Italian and Spanish called cocoliche, which was originated by the Italian immigrants in the late 19th century.)
- Arabic, specially its Northern Levantine dialect, by one million people.
- Standard German, by 400,000 people. (Note: It gave origin to a mixture of Spanish and German called Belgranodeutsch.)
- Yiddish, by 200,000 people, the largest Jewish population in Latin America and 7th in the world.
- Guaraní, by 200,000 people, mostly in Corrientes, where it is official de jure.
- Catalan, by 174,000 people.
- French, including the rare Occitan language.
- Quechua, by 65,000 people, mostly in the Northwest.
- Wichí, by 53,700 people, mainly in Chaco where, along with Kom and Moqoit, it is official de jure.
- Vlax Romani, by 52,000 people.
- Japanese, by 32,000 people.
- Aymara, by 30,000 people, mostly in the Northwest.
- Ukrainian, by 27,000 people.
- Welsh, including its Patagonian dialect, in which 25,000 people are fluent. Some districts have recently incorporated it as an educational language.

== Armenia ==
Armenian is the only official language. Due to its Soviet past, Russian is still widely used in Armenia and could be considered as de facto second language. According to a 2013 survey, 95% of Armenians said they had some knowledge of Russian (24% advanced, 59% intermediate) compared to 40% who said they knew some English (4% advanced, 16% intermediate and 20% beginner). However, more adults (50%) think that English should be taught in public secondary schools than those who prefer Russian (44%).

== Australia ==
Although Australia has no official language, English has always been entrenched as the de facto national language. Standard Australian English serves as the standard dialect. According to the 2016 census, English is the only language spoken in the home for 72.6% of the population. The next most common languages spoken at home are Mandarin (2.5%), Arabic (1.4%), Cantonese (1.2%), Vietnamese (1.2%), Italian (1.2%), Greek (1.0%), Tagalog (0.8%), Hindi (0.7%), Spanish (0.6%) and Punjabi (0.6%); a considerable proportion of first- and second-generation migrants are bilingual. A 2010–2011 study by the Australia Early Development Index found the most common language spoken by children after English was Arabic, followed by Vietnamese, Greek, Chinese, and Hindi. 0.3% of Australians spoke an Indigenous Australian language at home in 2016.

== Austria ==
The official and national language of Austria is German. In some regions in the east of the country Croatian is a co-official language too.

== Azerbaijan ==
Native language according to the census in 2009

Language	Both genders	Male	Female
Total	8 922 447	4 414 398	4 508 049
Azerbaijani	8 253 196	4 101 575	4 151 621
Russian	122 449	45 538	76 911
Armenian	120 237	57 912	62 325
Talish	68 689	34 154	34 535
Avar	46 610	23 107	23 503
Turkish	32 064	16 465	15 599
Tatar	24 146	10 614	13 532
Tat	22 803	11 485	11 318
Ukrainian	20 988	9 456	11 532
Tsakhur	11 734	5 915	5 819
Georgian	10 356	4 978	5 378
Hebrew	8 493	4 046	4 447
Udi	3 795	1 839	1 956
Other	176 887	87 314	89 573

== Bahamas ==
English is the most widely spoken language in the Bahamas. Bahamian Creole serves as a vernacular among much of the population. Haitian Bahamians speak Haitian Creole.

== Bahrain ==
Arabic is the official language of Bahrain, though English is widely used. Bahrani Arabic is the most widely spoken dialect of the Arabic language, though this differs slightly from standard Arabic. Among the Bahraini and non-Bahraini population, many people speak Persian, the official language of Iran, or Urdu, the official language of Pakistan. Malayalam and Nepali are also widely spoken in the Nepalese workers and Gurkha Soldiers community. Hindi is spoken among significant Indian communities.

== Bangladesh ==
According to the Report on Socio-Economic and Demographic Survey 2023 of the 2022 Bangladeshi census, 99.17% of Bangladeshis spoke the Bengali language as a mother tongue while 0.83% spoke other languages. 92.94% of people did not speak a second language; 6.10% of people spoke English as a second language; 0.80% of people spoke Bengali as a second language, and 0.17% of people spoke another language. Other languages include the Chakma language and the Santali language.

== Barbados ==
While English is the official language of Barbados, Bajan Creole is used as a vernacular tongue. 98% of Barbados' population is literate in English.

== Belarus ==
According to the 2019 Belarusian census, 54.1% of the population spoke the Belarusian language natively while 42.3% spoke the Russian language. The rest of the population spoke languages such as Polish and Ukrainian.

== Belgium ==
In the past, Belgium held a census each ten years, including a language census (nl/fr). Since 1932, the results of this census defined to which official language a municipality belonged (Dutch, French or German). However, this caused a lot of conflicts along the language border, in Brussels and its periphery (due to the Francization of Brussels). The territory of Belgium was consequently divided into four definitive official language areas and the language census was abolished, effective 1 September 1963. No national language censuses have been held since then.

== Bolivia ==
According to the last census in 2012

Language	People
Spanish	6,097,122
Quechua	2,124,040
Aymara	1,462,286
Foreign	241,417
Guarani	57,218
Another Native	43,953
No talking	14,960

== Brunei ==
The official language of Brunei is Malay. The principal spoken language is Melayu Brunei (Brunei Malay). Brunei Malay is rather divergent from standard Malay and the rest of the Malay dialects, being about 84% cognate with standard Malay, and is mostly mutually unintelligible with it. English and Chinese are also widely spoken, English is also used in business, as a working language, and as the language of instruction from primary to tertiary education, and there is a relatively large expatriate community. Other languages spoken include Kedayan, Tutong, Murut and Dusun.

== Bulgaria ==
In the Bulgarian census, the question about the mother tongue and the ethnic group is an optional one. The results among the people that have answered both questions according to the latest census in 2011 are:

Language	People
Bulgarian	5,631,759
Turkish	604,246
Romani	280,979
Russian	15,211
Armenian	5,567
Romanian	5,454
Greek	3,182
Aromanian	1,815
Ukrainian	1,691
Macedonian	1,376
Tatar	1,367
Arabic	1,321
Hebrew	141
Other	9,946
Does not self-identify	47,458
Did not answer	753,057
Population	7,364,570

== Canada ==
According to Statistics Canada, no other national census includes as many questions about language as does the Census in Canada; the 2016 census included seven such questions. In 2016, all respondents were asked, "Can this person speak English or French well enough to conduct a conversation?"; "What language does this person speak most often at home?"; "Does this person speak any other languages on a regular basis at home?"; and "What is the language that this person first learned at home in childhood and still understands?". In addition, a sample of 25% of households received a longer survey asking, "What language(s), other than English or French, can this person speak well enough to conduct a conversation?"; "In [the person's] job, what language did this person use most often?"; and "Did this person use any other languages on a regular basis in this job?".

The following is the breakdown of the language spoken most often at home according to the 2016 census:

Language	People	Percentage
English	22,908,550	65.9%
French	7,121,450	20.5%
All other languages	4,737,250	13.6%

Among immigrant languages (a term used by Statistics Canada to refer to languages other than English, French, Aboriginal languages, and sign languages), the top ten languages most commonly spoken at home in 2016 were the following:

Language	People
Mandarin	641,100
Cantonese	594,705
Punjabi	568,375
Spanish	553,495
Tagalog (Pilipino)	525,375
Arabic	514,200
Italian	318,245
German	271,865
Urdu	264,505
Persian (Farsi)	225,015

== China ==
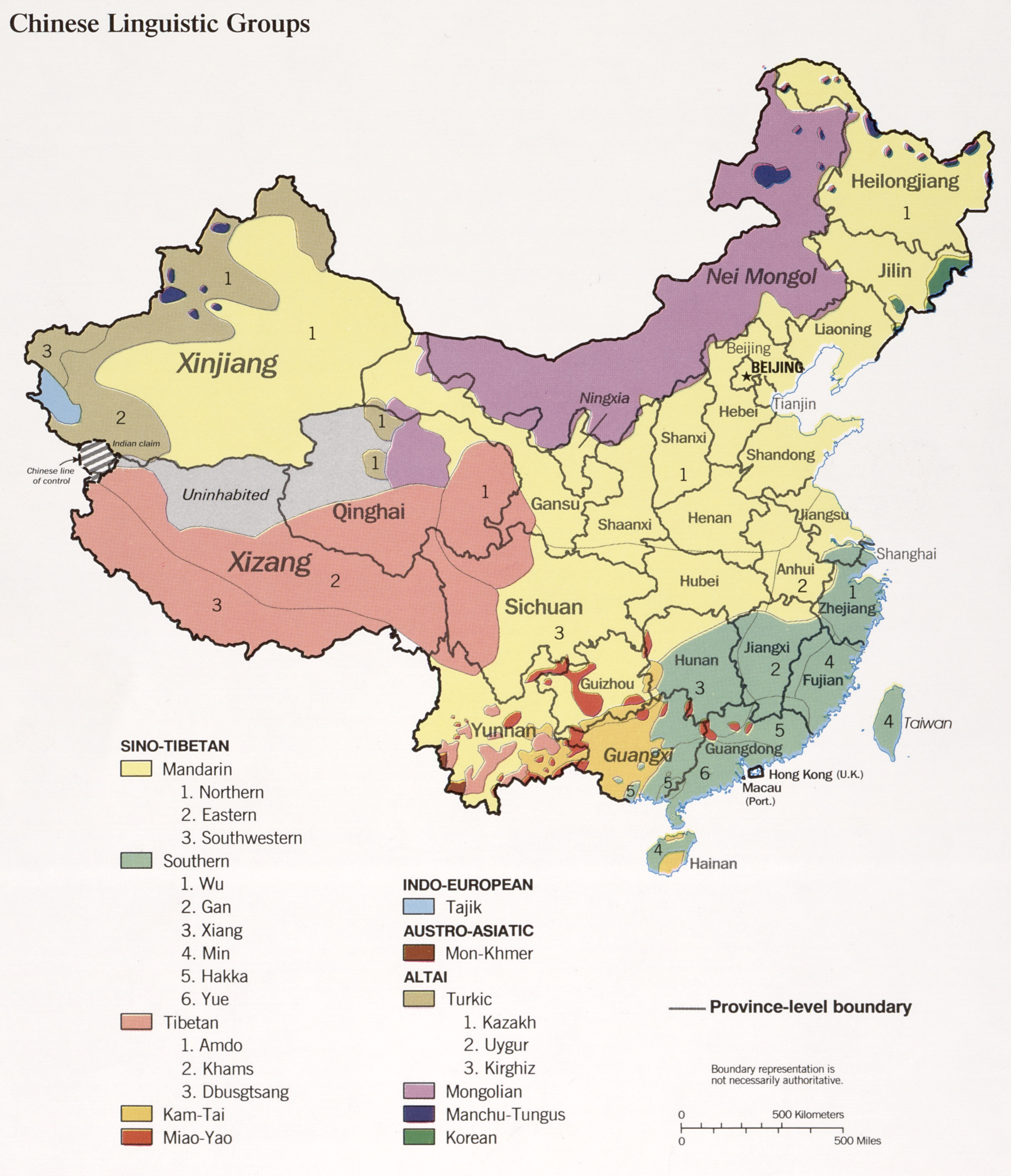
1990 map of Chinese ethnolinguistic groups

There are abouts 292 living languages in China. The languages most commonly spoken belong to the Sinitic branch of the Sino-Tibetan language family, which contains Mandarin (spoken natively by 70% of the population), and other Chinese languages: Wu (including Shanghainese), Yue (including Cantonese and Taishanese), Min (including Hokkien and Teochew), Xiang, Gan, and Hakka. Languages of the Tibeto-Burman branch, including Tibetan, Qiang, Naxi and Yi, are spoken across the Tibetan and Yunnan–Guizhou Plateau. Other ethnic minority languages in southwest China include Zhuang, Thai, Dong and Sui of the Tai-Kadai family, Miao and Yao of the Hmong–Mien family, and Wa of the Austroasiatic family. Across northeastern and northwestern China, minority ethnic groups speak Altaic languages including Manchu, Mongolian and several Turkic languages: Uyghur, Kazakh, Kyrgyz, Salar and Western Yugur. Korean is spoken natively along the border with North Korea. Sarikoli, the language of Tajiks in western Xinjiang, is an Indo-European language. Taiwanese aborigines, including a small population on the mainland, speak Austronesian languages.

Standard Mandarin, a variety of Mandarin based on the Beijing dialect, is the official national language of China and is used as a lingua franca in the country between people of different linguistic backgrounds.

== Cyprus ==
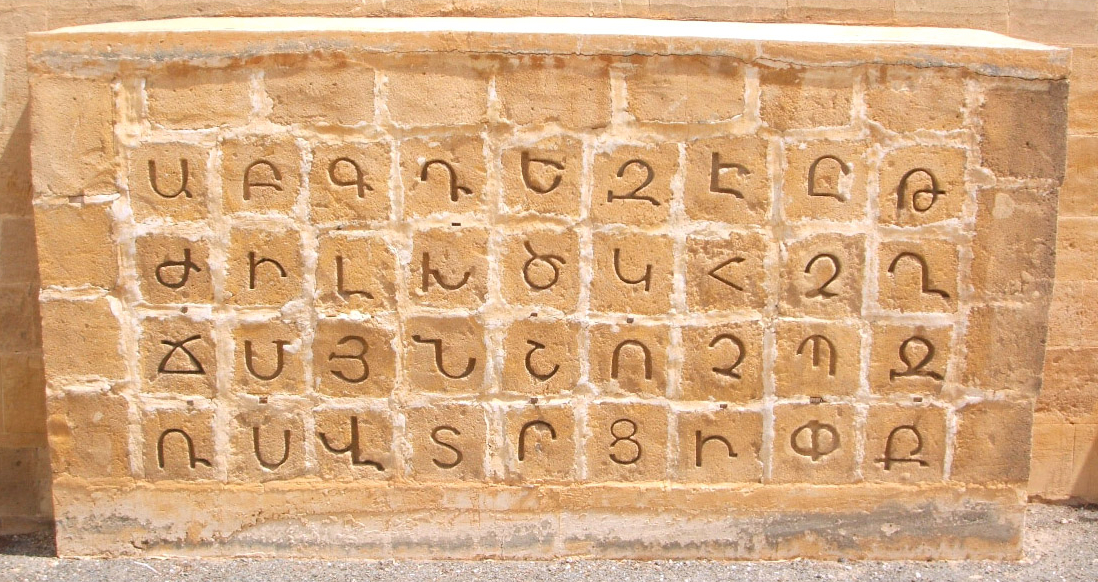
The Armenian Alphabet at the Melkonian Educational Institute. Armenian is recognised as a minority language in Cyprus.

Cyprus road signs in Greek and English. An estimate of 87% of Cypriot population speaks English.

Cyprus has two official languages, Greek and Turkish. Armenian and Cypriot Maronite Arabic are recognized as minority languages. Although without official status, English is widely spoken. English features on road signs, public notices, and in advertisements, etc. English was the sole official language during British colonial rule and lingua franca (until 1960) and continued to be used (de facto) in courts of law until 1989 and in legislature until 1996. A reported 80.4% of Greek Cypriots have command of the English language as second language (L2). Russian is widely spoken among the country's minorities, residents and citizens of post-Soviet countries, as well as Pontic Greeks. It is used and spoken by approximately 100,000 people, including Russians, Ukrainians, Belarusians, Armenians, Pontic Greeks, Georgians and Bulgarians. Russian, after English and Greek, is the third language used on many signs of shops and restaurants, particularly in Limassol and Paphos. In addition to these languages, 12% speak French and 5% speak German.

The everyday spoken language of Greek Cypriots is Cypriot Greek and that of Turkish Cypriots is Cypriot Turkish. These both differ from their respective standard register quite significantly.

== Czech Republic ==
The first official censuses for the Czech lands (then part of Austria-Hungary) in the years 1869–1910 recorded each person's "language of communication" ("obcovací řeč"). This used to be criticised by linguistic minorities as representing the language of a person's surroundings rather than his or her own. The Czechoslovak censuses (1921, 1930, 1950, 1961, 1980) did not register respondents' language but "národnost" (ethnicity) which was to be assessed primarily, but not exclusively, on the basis of the person's "maternal tongue" ("mateřská řeč"). The 1970 census as well as modern censuses (1990, 2001, 2011) register both "ethnicity" and "maternal tongue" (which was, for example in the 2001 census, defined as "the language in which your mother or the persons having raised you spoke with you during your childhood"). The 2011 census form was the first to allow a person to claim two native languages. While certain options are habitually suggested in the form (in 2011: Czech, Slovak, Romani, Polish, German, sign language), the possibility "Other" can be chosen together with completing one's own specification. Unlike "ethnicity", this is an obligatory field in the form.

As the 2011 census introduced the possibility to state two native languages, the table below includes the number in both languages' rows.

Language	2001 census	2011 census	2021 census
Czech¹	9,707,397	9,530,518	9,242,634
Slovak	208,723	235,475	225,246
Polish	50,738	50,877	49,669
German	41,328	40,790	31,756
Romani	23,211	40,370	28,102
English	3,791	7,202	30,478
Arabic	—	2,671	–
Belarusian	—	826	–
Bosnian	—	726	–
Bulgarian	—	5,405	–
Chinese	—	3,422	–
French	—	2,056	–
Croatian	—	1,392	–
Italian	—	1,418	–
Hungarian	—	9,286	14,664
Moldavian	—	2,211	–
Mongolian	—	3,333	–
Romanian	—	2,711	–
Rusyn	—	777	–
Russian	18,746	31,622	96,361
Greek	—	1,362	–
Serbian	—	1,931	–
Spanish	—	1,916	–
Ukrainian	—	48,250	123,738
Vietnamese	—	30,830	57,408
Signing	—	7,216	–
Others, unknown	176,126	464,056	759,394

¹ Including Moravian (62,908 in 2011, 28,647 in 2021)

== Denmark ==
Danish censuses did not include inquiries on languages. The last one was in 1970.

== East Timor ==
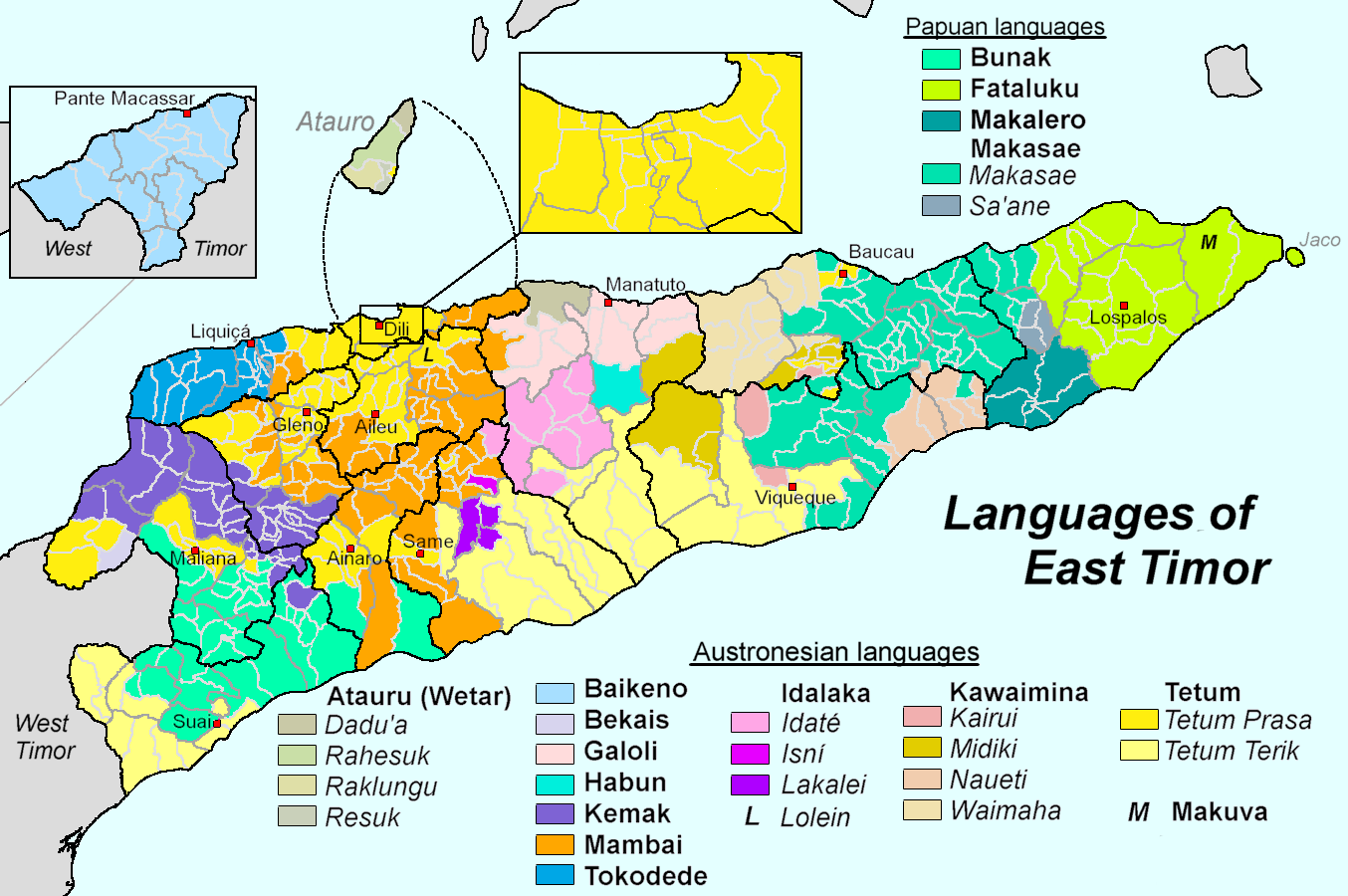
Biggest language groups in sucos of East Timor.

Speakers by mother tongue in census 2010.

- Official languages:
  - Tetum: 449,085
  - Portuguese: 595
- National languages:
  - Atauro (Wetarese, including Dadu'a, Rahesuk, Raklungu and Resuk): 8,400
  - Bekais (Becais, Welaun): 3,887
  - Bunak (Bunaq, Búnaque, Buna', Bunake, Mgai, Gai, Marae): 55,837
  - Fataluku (Fataluco, Fatalukunu, Dagaga, Dagoda, Dagada): 37,779
  - Galoli (Galóli, Lo'ok, Galole, Galolen, Glolen): 13,066
  - Habun (Habo): 2,741
  - Idalaka (Idalaca, including Idaté, Lakalei, Isní und Lolein): 18,854
  - Kawaimina (Cauaimina, including Kairui, Waimaha, Midiki, Naueti): 49,096
  - Kemak (Ema, Quémaque): 61,969
  - Makuva (Makuwa, Maku'a, Lovaia, Lovaea): 56
  - Makalero (Macalero, Maklere): 7,802
  - Makasae (Macasae, Makasai, Makassai, Makassae, Macassai, Ma'asae, including Sa'ane): 101,854
  - Mambai (Mambae, Manbae): 131,361
  - Tokodede (Tocodede, Tukude, Tokodé, Tocod): 39,483
  - Baikeno (Dawan): 62,201
- Working languages:
  - English
  - Indonesian
- Extinct languages:
  - Rusenu
- Other languages:
  - Adabe: 181

== Estonia ==
According to the 2011 Population and Housing Census (PHC 2011) 157 (up from 109 in 2000) different languages are spoken as native language in Estonia. Of those 25 have more than 100 speakers.

Estonian is the official language of Estonia and 886,859 or 68.5% of permanent residents spoke it as native language. Russian is spoken by 383,062 (29.6%), Ukrainian by 8,012 (0.6%), Finnish by 2,617 (0.17%) and Belarusian by 1,663 (0.13%). Other languages have less than thousand speakers.

== Faroe Islands ==
There are two official languages in the Faroe Islands, Danish and Faroese. According to the public census Hagstova Føroya in 2014, more than 90 percent had Faroese as their first language. The entire list of spoken languages in 2014 is:

Faroese	45 361 (90.8%)
Danish	1546 (3.1%)
Icelandic	201 (0.4%)
English	190 (0.3%)
Filipino	103 (0.2%)
Norwegian	99 (0.2%)
Thai	86 (0.1%)
Romanian	67 (0.1%)
Greenlandic	62 (0.1%)
Serbian	57 (0.1%)
Russian	55 (0.1%)
Spanish	49 (0.1%)
Swedish	45 (0.09%)
Polish	40 (0.08%)
Chinese	29 (0.06%)

== Fiji ==
Fiji currently recognises 3 languages in its country. The languages are Fijian, Fiji Hindi and English. As of 2017 450,000 of the population speaks Fijian as their first language and another 200,000 speak it as their second language. Fiji Hindi is another of the official languages of Fiji and has about 460,000 as of 1991. English is an official language as it was a British colony some time ago. There are many other languages spoken in Fiji such as Hindi and Chinese but they do not have any status in Fiji.

== Finland ==
According to the Finnish constitution, the two national languages of Finland are Finnish and Swedish. About six per cent of the Finnish people speak Swedish as their mother tongue. The constitution also grants for the speakers of Sami, Romani and other languages the right to maintain and develop their language and culture. The right to use sign language is also set in the Finnish Language Act. In accordance with the Population Census Act, censuses are drawn every ten years, and the mother tongue of each resident is registered. However, key census data, including population by native language, are updated annually. According to the official statistics, speakers of 155 different languages have been registered. The censuses use the ISO 639-1 language classification.

== France ==
France recognizes but one language, French, declared national language. Other indigenous languages have no official status, although their teaching is tolerated in some places under specific conditions, and there has never been any question about languages in a French national census.

However, the March 1999 census was associated with an INSEE survey "Study of family history" for 380 thousand people, including questions about language transmission.

== Germany ==
The census 2011 and the West-German census 1987 did not inquire about language. Since the 2017 micro census, a survey conducted with a sampling fraction of 1% of the persons and households in Germany that supplies basic socio-demographic data and facilitates the ongoing monitoring of the labour market, a question asking "Which language is being spoken predominantly in your household?" was added, eighty years since the 1939 Census asked for the Mother tongue of the population.

== Greece ==
The official language of Greece is Greek, spoken by 99% of the population. In addition, a number of non-official, minority languages and some Greek dialects are spoken as well. The most common foreign languages learned by Greeks are English, German, French, Spanish and Italian.

== Haiti ==
The two official languages of Haiti are French and Haitian Creole. French is the principal written and administratively authorized language. It is spoken by all educated Haitians, is the medium of instruction in most schools, and is used in the business sector. Haitian Creole, which recently undergone a standardization, is spoken by virtually the entire population of Haiti.

== Hong Kong ==
Officially English and Chinese are the two official language of Hong Kong. The definition of Chinese is somehow ambiguous as Chinese itself consists of a number of mutually unintelligible varieties. Cantonese is the major spoken language in Hong Kong and written in various form with traditional Chinese characters. English is a variant of British English, though American English is also commonly used in Hong Kong.

From 19th century, the population Census in Hong Kong has investigated what languages the people of Hong Kong speak. Hakka, Hoklo, Sze Yap, Shanghainese and Tanka have lost importance over time. Cantonese has come to be spoken by the vast majority, though there are increasingly more Mandarin-speaking people, particularly since the turn of the millennium.

== Hungary ==
Starting from 1880 the Hungarian census system was based on native language (the language spoken at home in the early life of the person and at the time of the survey), vulgar language (the most frequently used language in the family), and other spoken languages.

Native language according to the last census in 2011

Language	1930 census	1970 census	1980 census	1990 census	2001 census	2011 census
Hungarian	8,000,335	10,152,366	10,579,898	10,222,529	9,546,374	8,409,049
Romani, beas	7,841	34,692	27,915	48,072	48,438	54,339
German	477,153	33,653	31,231	37,511	33,774	38,248
Romanian	16,221	12,356	10,141	8,730	8,482	13,886
Croatian	47,332	21,855	20,484	17,577	14,326	13,716
Slovak	104,786	21,086	16,054	12,745	11,817	9,888
Serbian	7,031	11,177	3,426	2,953	3,388	3,708
Ukrainian	...	...	...	674	4,885	3,384
Polish	5,161	...	...	3,788	2,580	3,049
Bulgarian	2,816	...	...	1,370	1,299	2,899
Greek	82	...	...	1,640	1,921	1,872
Slovenian	5,464	3,791	3,142	2,627	3,180	1,723
Rusin	996	...	...	...	1,113	999
Armenian	122	...	...	37	294	444
Russian	...	...	...	3,902	3,257	7,382
Chinese	15	...	...	204	2,414	5,819
Arabian	...	...	...	1,456	1,438	2,929
Vietnamese	...	...	...	1,258	1,085	2,674
Other languages	...	15,083	17,172	8,944	36,270	21,657
Unknown	–	–	–	–	541,106	1,443,840
Population	8,685,109	10,300,996	10,709,463	10,374,823	10,198,315	9,937,628

== Iceland ==
Iceland has been a very isolated and linguistically homogeneous island historically, but has nevertheless beheld several languages. Gaelic was native to many of the early Icelanders, the Icelandic or Norse language however prevailing, albeit absorbing Gaelic features. Later, northern trade routes brought German, English, Dutch, French and Basque. Some merchants and clergymen settled in Iceland throughout the centuries, leaving their mark on culture, but linguistically mainly trade, nautical or religious terms. Excluding these and Latin words, Icelandic has altered remarkably little since settlement, the island's residents living in seclusion.

Icelandic is not only the national language, but is now "the official language in Iceland" by virtue of Act No 61/2011, adopted by parliament in 2011. Icelandic Sign Language was also officially recognised by law in 2011 as a minority language with constitutional rights and the first language of the Icelandic deaf community. During the time of Danish rule, Danish was a minority language in Iceland, although it is nowadays only spoken by a small number of immigrants.

== India ==
India is a linguistically diverse country, with over 121 languages and 270 dialects spoken. The population of India in 1991 exhibited 19.4% bilingualism and 7.2% trilingualism. Hindi is the most widely spoken language in India, with over 522 million native speakers. It is also the official language of the central government of India. Bengali is the second most widely spoken language in India, with over 97 million native speakers. Marathi is the third most widely spoken language in India, with over 83 million native speakers. The other major languages in India are Telugu, Tamil, Gujarati, Urdu, Kannada, Odia, Malayalam, Punjabi, Assamese, Konkani, Maithili, Dogri, and Santali.

== Indonesia ==
Indonesian functions as the official language of the country, but it coexists with a high number of local languages. According to Ethnologue, there are currently about 737 living languages in Indonesia, the most widely spoken being Javanese. Most Indonesians are bilingual and trilingual.

A number of Chinese varieties, most prominently Min Nan, are also spoken. The public use of Chinese, especially Chinese written characters, was officially discouraged between 1966 and 1998.

Arabic are used in religious setting, and in Madrasah (Islamic boarding school), and in various names (people and places). Arabic script (Jawi script) is used in many local languages.

English is taught in school as foreign language. Some school are also teaching other languages as foreign language, such as Chinese, and/or other Asian/European languages.

== Iran ==
The majority of the population speaks Persian, which is also the official language of the country, as well as other Iranian languages or dialects. Turkic languages and dialects, most importantly Azerbaijani language, are spoken in different areas in Iran. In southwestern and southern Iran, Luri and Lari are spoken. In Kurdistan Province and nearby area's Kurdish is widely spoken. In Khuzestan, many distinct Persian dialects are spoken. Arabic is also spoken in Khuzestan. Notable minority languages in Iran include Armenian, Georgian, and Neo-Aramaic. Circassian was also once widely used by the large Circassian minority, but due to assimilation over the many years no sizable number of Circassians speak the language anymore.

== Iraq ==
Arabic is the majority language while Kurdish is spoken by approximately 10–15% of the population and Turkmen, the Neo-Aramaic language of the Assyrians and others, by 5%. Other smaller minority languages includes Mandaic, Shabaki, Armenian, Circassian and Persian.

Previously to the invasion in 2003, Arabic was the sole official language. Since the new Constitution of Iraq was approved in June 2004, both Arabic and Kurdish are an official languages, while Assyrian Neo-Aramaic and Turkmen language (referred to as respectively "Syriac" and "Turkmen" in the constitution) are recognized as a regional languages. In addition, any region or province may declare other languages official if a majority of the population approves in a general referendum.

Based on the Iraqi constitution: "The Arabic language and the Kurdish language are the two official languages of Iraq. The right of Iraqis to educate their children in their mother tongue, such as Turkmen, Assyrian, and Armenian shall be guaranteed in government educational institutions in accordance with educational guidelines, or in any other language in private educational institutions".

== Ireland ==
The 2016 Irish census included the following questions: "Can you speak Irish?" (and if yes, whether the respondent spoke Irish daily within the education system, daily outside the education system, weekly, less often, or never); "Do you speak a language other than English or Irish at home?" (and if yes, which language); and "How well do you speak English?" (very well, well, not well, or not at all).

In 2016, 1,761,420 persons stated that they could speak Irish (39.8% of the population). However, of this group, 418,420 (23.8% of Irish speakers) reported that they never spoke it, and 558,608 (31.7%) reported that they only spoke it within the education system.

== Ivory Coast ==
French, as an official language, is taught in schools and serves as a lingua franca in the country. Ethnic groups include Akan 42.1%, Voltaiques or Gur 17.6%, Northern Mandes 16.5%, Krous 11%, Southern Mandes 10%, other 2.8% (includes 30,000 Lebanese and 45,000 French; 2004). 77% of the population are considered Ivoirians. They represent several different peoples and language groups. An estimated 65 languages are spoken in the country. One of the most common is Dyula, which acts as a trade language as well as a language commonly spoken by the Muslim population.

== Jamaica ==
The official language of Jamaica is English. Jamaicans primarily speak an English-African Creole language known as Jamaican Patois.

The 2011 Population and Housing Census did not include any questions about language use.

== Japan ==
More than 99 percent of the population speaks Japanese as their first language.

Besides Japanese, other languages like Ryukyuan languages (Amami, Kunigami, Okinawan, Miyako, Yaeyama, Yonaguni), also part of the Japonic language family, are spoken in the Ryukyu Islands chain. Few children learn these languages, but in recent years the local governments have sought to increase awareness of the traditional languages. The Okinawan Japanese dialect is also spoken in the region. The Ainu language, which has no proven relationship to Japanese or any other language, is moribund, with only a few elderly native speakers remaining in Hokkaido. Most public and private schools require students to take courses in both Japanese and English.

== Luxembourg ==
Some figures from the 2011 census:

Main language spoken as of 1 February 2011 (in %)

Main language	%
Luxembourgish	55,8
Portuguese	15,7
French	12,1
German	3,1
Italian	2,9
Other languages	8,4
Total	100

Source: STATEC – RP2011, Langue principale parlée au 1er février 2011, en %

Languages spoken at work, at school and/or at home on 1 February 2011 (multiple answers possible)

Languages	Number of people	%
Luxembourgish	323.557	70,5
French	255.669	55,7
German	140.590	30,6
English	96.427	21,0
Portuguese	91.872	20,0
Italian	28.561	6,2
other languages	55.298	12,1
Total	458.900	100,0

Source : STATEC – RP2011: Langues parlées au travail, à l'école et/ou à la maison au 1er février 2011 (réponses multiples possibles)

Number of languages spoken at work, at school and/or at home, as of 1 February 2011

Number of languages	Number of people	%
1	182.609	39,79
2	119.103	25,95
3	79.651	17,36
4	58.642	12,78
5	16.212	3,53
6	2.203	0,48
7	480	0,10
Average 2,2		

Source : STATEC – RP2011: Nombre de langues parlées au 1er février 2011

== Macedonia ==
As of the last national census in 2002, of the republic's 2,022,547 people, 67% speak Macedonian as their mother tongue. The next most common mother tongue is Albanian with 25% of the population. Other minority languages include Turkish (3.6%), Romani (1.9%), and the Serbo-croatian languages (1.6%).

== Malaysia ==
The national or official language is Malay, which is the mother tongue of the majority Malay ethnic group. The main ethnic groups within Malaysia comprise the Malays, Chinese and Indians, with many other ethnic groups represented in smaller numbers, each with its own languages. The largest native languages spoken in East Malaysia are the Iban, Dusunic and the Kadazan languages. English is widely understood in service industries and is a compulsory subject in primary and secondary school.

Malaysia contains speakers of 137 living languages, 41 of which are found in Peninsula Malaysia. The government provides schooling at the primary level in each of the three major languages, Malay, Chinese (Mandarin), and Tamil. Within these three there are a number of dialectal differences.

== Malta ==
Malta has two official languages: Maltese and English. Maltese is also the national language. Until 1934, Italian was also an official language in Malta. Having been governed by many different countries in the past, the Maltese population is generally able to converse in languages which are not native to the country, namely English and Italian.

According to the 2011 census, there were 377,952 people aged 10 and over, of whom 352,121 people (93.2%) declared to speak Maltese "Well", 248,570 (65.8%) declared to speak English "Well" and 93,401 (24.7%) declared to speak Italian "Well", out of a scale made of "Well", "Average", "A little" and "Not at all".

== Mongolia ==
The official language of Mongolia is Mongolian, which is spoken by 95% of the population. A variety of dialects of Oirat and Buryat are spoken across the country, and there are also some speakers of Mongolic Khamnigan. In the west of the country, Kazakh and Tuvan, both Turkic languages, are also spoken. Mongolian Sign Language is the principal language of the deaf community.

Russian is the most frequently spoken foreign language in Mongolia, followed by English, although English has been gradually replacing Russian as the second language. Korean has gained popularity as tens of thousands of Mongolians work in South Korea.

Interest in Chinese, as the language of the other neighbouring power, has been growing. A number of older educated Mongolian citizens speak some German, as they studied in the former East Germany, while a few speak other languages from the former Eastern Bloc. Many younger people are fluent in the Western European languages as they study or work in, among other places, Germany, France and Italy.

== Myanmar ==
The official language of Myanmar is Burmese; which is spoken by 81% of population. First language is about 69% and second language user is about 12%.

== Nepal ==
The 2011 National census lists 123 languages spoken as a mother tongue (first language) in Nepal. Most belong to the Indo-Aryan and Sino-Tibetan language families.

The official language of Nepal is Nepali (नेपाली), formerly called Khaskura then Gorkhali. According to the 2011 national census, the percentage of people with Nepali as the mother tongue is 44.6%.

== New Zealand ==
The 2018 New Zealand census included a question asking, "In what language(s) could you have a conversation about a lot of everyday things?" Respondents could choose more than one language. The top five selections were:

Language	People	Percentage
English	4,482,135	95.4%
te reo Māori	185,955	4.0%
Samoan	101,937	2.2%
Northern Chinese (including Mandarin)	95,253	2.0%
Hindi	69,471	1.5%

== Norway ==
In the Norwegian census of 1970, in limited areas in Northern Norway, people were identified by ethnicity and language. Such information has not been included in any census since then. During the 19th century, the Norwegian government collected ethnicity and language information.

== Philippines ==
Top 5 national languages (Ethnologue, 2013)
Language	Speakers(millions)
Tagalog/Filipino	52
Cebuano	16
Ilokano	7
Hiligaynon	6
Bikol	5

Ethnologue lists 175 individual languages in the Philippines, 171 of which are living languages, while 4 no longer have any known speakers. Most native languages are part of the Philippine branch of the Malayo-Polynesian languages, which is itself a branch of the Austronesian language family. The only non-Austronesian language indigenous to the Philippines is Chavacano, a Spanish-based creole. According to the 1987 Philippine Constitution, Filipino and English are the official languages. Filipino is a standardized version of Tagalog, spoken mainly in Metro Manila and other urban regions. Both Filipino and English are used in government, education, print, broadcast media, and business. The constitution mandates that Spanish and Arabic shall be promoted on a voluntary and optional basis.

Nineteen regional languages act as auxiliary official languages used as mediums of instruction: Aklanon, Bikol, Cebuano, Chavacano, Hiligaynon, Ibanag, Ilocano, Ivatan, Kapampangan, Kinaray-a, Maguindanao, Maranao, Pangasinan, Sambal, Surigaonon, Tagalog, Tausug, Waray, and Yakan. Other indigenous languages such as Cuyonon, Ifugao, Itbayat, Kalinga, Kamayo, Kankanaey, Masbateño, Romblomanon, and several Visayan languages are prevalent in their respective provinces. The Chavacano language, a creole language born from Spanish (of the Mexican and Peruvian strain), is also spoken in Cavite and Zamboanga. Languages not indigenous to the islands are also taught in select schools. Standard Mandarin is used in Chinese schools catering to the Chinese Filipino community. Islamic schools in Mindanao teach Modern Standard Arabic in their curriculum. French, German, Japanese, Korean, Spanish are taught with the help of foreign linguistic institutions, respectively, Alliance Française, Goethe-Institut, Japan Foundation, Korean Cultural Center or King Sejong Institute, and Instituto Cervantes. The Department of Education began teaching the Malay languages Indonesian and Malaysian in 2013.

== Poland ==
In the 2002 census and 2011 census was the possibility to state more than one home language, while in 2011 census was also possibility to state native languages; the table below includes the number in all languages' rows.

Language	2002 census (home language)	2011 census (home language)	2011 census (native language)
Polish	37,405,335	37,815,606	37,656,090
English	89,874	103,541	5,624
Belarusian	40,650	26,448	17,480
French	15,282	10,677	3,488
Kashubian	52,665	108,140	13,799
German	204,573	96,461	58,170
Romani	15,788	14,468	8,612
Russian	15,299	19,805	17,048
Silesian	56,643	529,377	140,012
Ukrainian	22,698	24,539	28,172
Italian	12,001	10,295	2,207
Unknown	772,223	519,698	521,842
Population	38,230,080	38,511,824	38,511,824

== Portugal ==
The official language of Portugal is Portuguese, which is spoken by the whole population. A small minority speaks Mirandese, recognized as a regional language, but all Mirandese speakers also speak Portuguese.

== Qatar ==
Arabic is the official language of Qatar, with Qatari Arabic the local dialect. Qatari Sign Language is the language of the deaf community. English is also widely spoken, and is considered to be a rising lingua franca, especially in commerce, to the extent that steps are being taken to try to preserve Arabic from English's encroachment. English is particularly useful for communication with Qatar's large expatriate community. In 2012, Qatar joined the international French-speaking organisation of La Francophonie as a new associate member, justifying its inscription by the consequent number of French speakers in the country (10% of the Qatari population would be francophone). Reflecting the multicultural make-up of the country, many other languages are also spoken, including Hindi, Malayalam, Urdu, Tamil, Nepali and Tagalog.

== Romania ==
Romanian is the official language of Romania. According to the last census in 2011

Language	People
Total	20,121,641
Romanian	17,176,544
Hungarian	1,259,914
Romani	245,677
Ukrainian	48,910
German	26,557
Turkish	25,302
Russian	18,946
Tatar	17,677
Serbian	16,805
Slovak	12,802
Bulgarian	6,518
Croatian	5,167
Italian	2,949
Greek	2,561
Czech	2,174
Polish	2,079
Chinese	2,039
Macedonian	769
Armenian	739
Hebrew	643
Other	16,841
Information not available	1,230,028

== Singapore ==
Native languages (mother tongues) of Singaporeans
Language	Percent
Mandarin Chinese	50%
English	32%
Malay	12%
Tamil	3%

Singapore has four official languages. The four languages that are recognised by the Singapore Government are: English, Malay, Mandarin, and Tamil. They were chosen to correspond with the major ethnic groups present in Singapore at the time as well as for the following reasons: Mandarin had gained status since the introduction of Chinese-medium schools; Malay was deemed the "most obvious choice" for the Malay community; and Tamil for the largest Indian ethnic group in Singapore, in addition to being "the language with the longest history of education in Malaysia and Singapore". In 2009, more than 20 languages were identified as being spoken in Singapore, reflecting a rich linguistic diversity in the city. Singapore's historical roots as a trading settlement gave rise to an influx of foreign traders, and their languages were slowly embedded in Singapore's modern day linguistic repertoire.

Language most frequently spoken at home (%)
Language	1990	2000	2010
English	18.8	23.0	32.3
Mandarin	23.7	35.0	35.6
other varieties of Chinese	39.6	23.8	14.3
Malay	14.3	14.1	12.2
Tamil	2.9	3.2	3.3

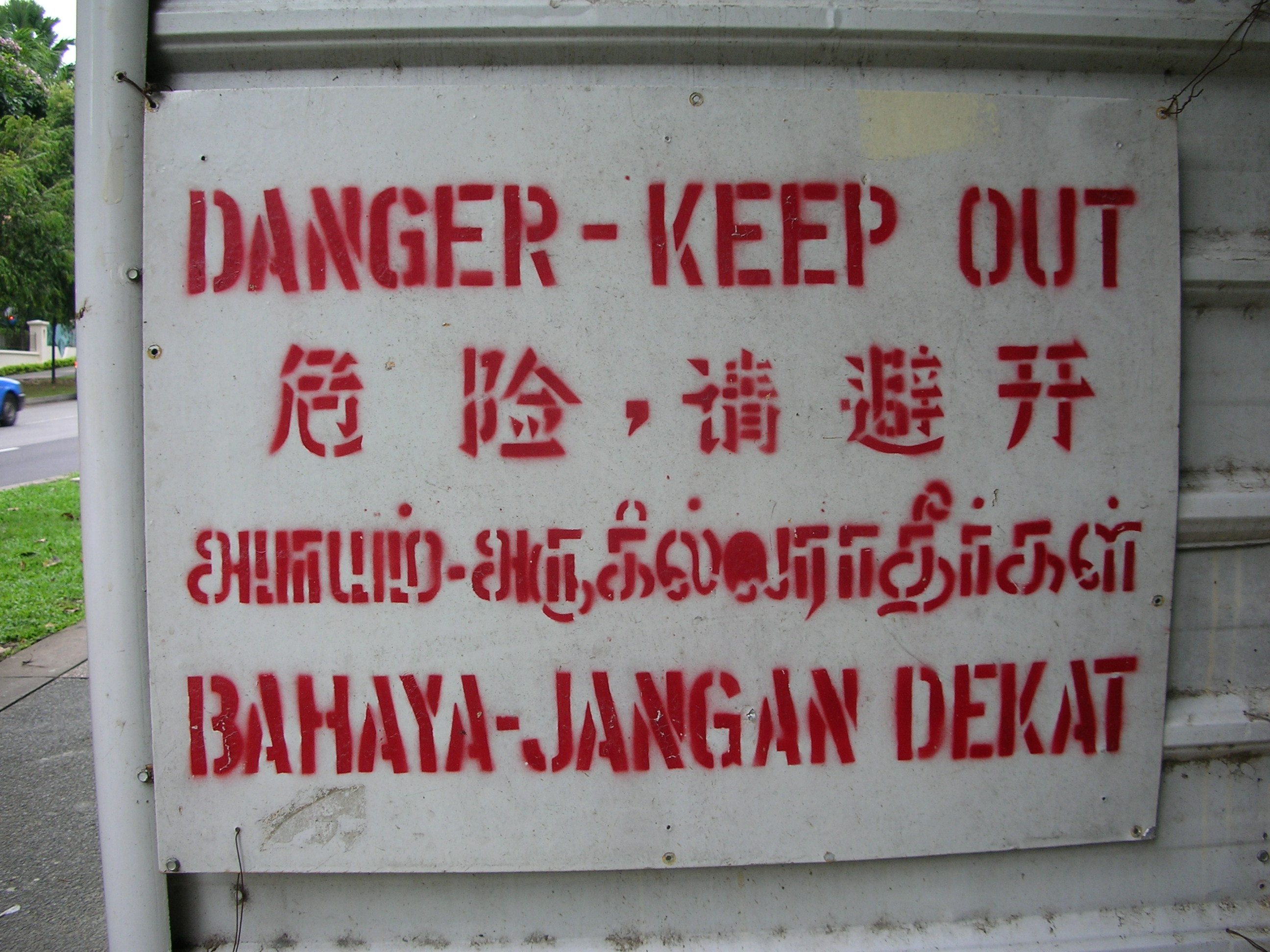
Quadrilingual warning sign written in Singapore's four official languages; English, Chinese, Tamil and Malay.

Malay is the national language of the country, although English is mainly used. English serves as the link between the different ethnic groups and is the language of the educational system and the administration. The colloquial English used in everyday life is often referred to as Singlish.

The government of Singapore has been promoting the use of Mandarin, the official form of Chinese in Singapore as well as mainland China and Taiwan, with its Speak Mandarin Campaign among the Chinese population. The use of other varieties of Chinese, like Hokkien, Teochew, Cantonese, Hainanese and Hakka, has been declining over the last two decades, although they are still being used especially by the older generations of the Chinese population.

About 60% of Singapore's Indian population speaks Tamil as their native language. Other widely spoken Indian languages are Punjabi, Malayalam, Hindi and Telugu.

Around 5,000 Peranakans, the early Chinese population of the region, still use the Hokkien-influenced Malay dialect that called Baba Malay.

== South Africa ==
Thirteen options are provided in response to the question "Which two languages does (name) speak most often in this household?", namely the eleven official languages, sign language and "Other".

== Spain ==
The languages of Spain (simplified): Spanish official and spoken all over the country Catalan/Valencian, co-official Basque, co-official Galician, co-official / Aranese (a dialect of Occitan), co-official Asturian, recognized Aragonese, recognized Leonese, unofficial Extremaduran, unofficial Fala, unofficial

Spain is openly multilingual, and the constitution establishes that the nation will protect "all Spaniards and the peoples of Spain in the exercise of human rights, their cultures and traditions, languages and institutions.

Spanish (español)—officially recognized in the constitution as Castilian (castellano)—is the official language of the entire country, and it is the right and duty of every Spaniard to know the language. The constitution also establishes that "all other Spanish languages"—that is, all other languages of Spain—will also be official in their respective autonomous communities in accordance to their Statutes, their organic regional legislations, and that the "richness of the distinct linguistic modalities of Spain represents a patrimony which will be the object of special respect and protection."

The other official languages of Spain, co-official with Spanish are:

- Basque (euskara) in the Basque Country and Navarre;
- Catalan (català) in Catalonia, the Balearic Islands and in the Valencian Community, where its distinct modality of the language is officially known as Valencian (valencià); and
- Galician (galego) in Galicia

As a percentage of the general population, Basque is spoken by 2%, Catalan (or Valencian) by 17%, and Galician by 7% of all Spaniards.

In Catalonia, Aranese (aranés), a local variety of the Occitan language, has been declared co-official along with Catalan and Spanish since 2006. It is spoken only in the comarca of Val d'Aran by roughly 6,700 people. Other Romance minority languages, though not official, have special recognition, such as the Astur-Leonese group (Asturian, asturianu; also called "bable", in Asturias and Leonese, llionés, in Castile and León) and Aragonese (aragonés) in Aragon.

In the North African Spanish autonomous city of Melilla, Riff Berber is spoken by a significant part of the population. In the tourist areas of the Mediterranean coast and the islands, English and German are widely spoken by tourists, foreign residents, and tourism workers.

== Sri Lanka ==
Both Sinhala and Tamil are the official and national languages of Sri Lanka. The Sinhala language is spoken by the Sinhalese people, who constitute approximately 74% of the national population and total about 13 million. It utilizes the Sinhala abugida script, which is derived from the ancient Brahmi script. The Rodiya language, a dialect of Sinhala, is spoken by the low-caste community of chamodi veddhas. The Veddah peoples, totaling barely 2500, speak a distinct language, possibly a creolized form of an earlier indigenous language. The Tamil language is spoken by Sri Lankan Tamils, as well as by Tamil migrants from the neighboring Indian state of Tamil Nadu and by Sri Lankan Moors. Tamil speakers number around 5 million. There are more than 50,000 speakers of the Sri Lankan Creole Malay language, which is strongly influenced by the Malay language.

== Suriname ==
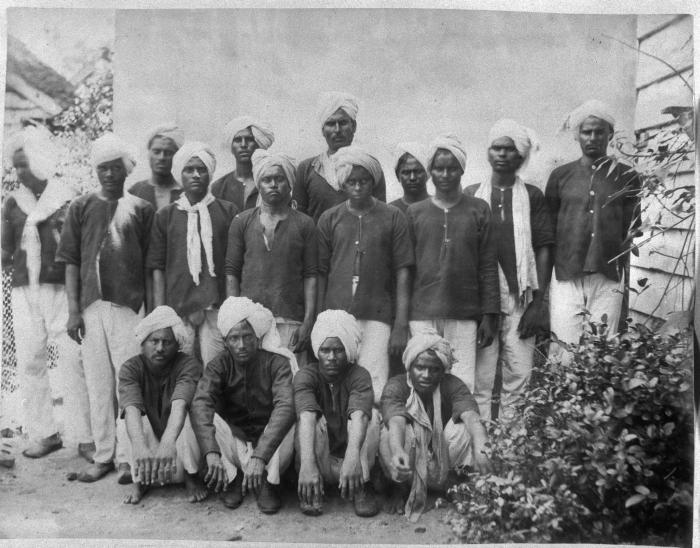
Indian immigrants from British India

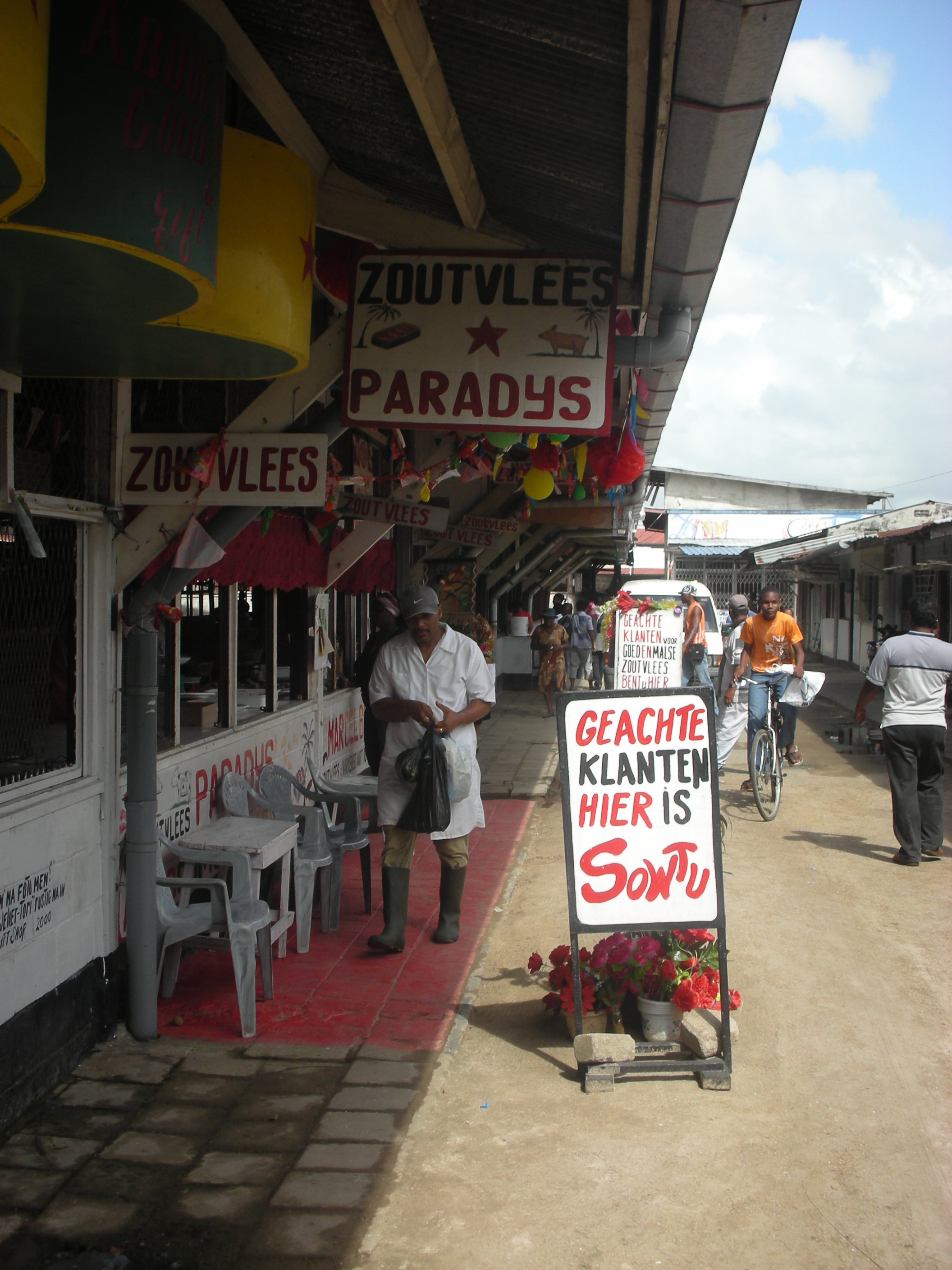
Butcher market in Paramaribo with signs written in Dutch.

Dutch is the sole official language, and is the language of education, government, business, and the media. Over 60% of the population speak Dutch as a mother tongue, and most of the rest speak it as a second language.

In Paramaribo, Dutch is the main home language in two-thirds of households. The recognition of "Surinaams-Nederlands" ("Surinamese Dutch") as a national dialect equal to "Nederlands-Nederlands" ("Dutch Dutch") and "Vlaams-Nederlands" ("Flemish Dutch") was expressed in 2009 by the publication of the Woordenboek Surinaams Nederlands (Surinamese–Dutch Dictionary). Only in the interior of Suriname is Dutch seldom spoken.

Sranan, a local creole language originally spoken by the creole population group, is the most widely used language in the streets and is often used interchangeably with Dutch depending on the formality of the setting.

Surinamese Hindi or Sarnami, a dialect of Bhojpuri, is the third-most used language, spoken by the descendants of South Asian contract workers from then British India. Javanese is used by the descendants of Javanese contract workers. The Maroon languages, somewhat intelligible with Sranan Tongo, include Saramaka, Paramakan, Ndyuka (also called Aukan), Kwinti and Matawai. Amerindian languages, spoken by Amerindians, include Carib and Arawak. Hakka and Cantonese are spoken by the descendants of the Chinese contract workers. Mandarin is spoken by some few recent Chinese immigrants. English, Spanish and Portuguese are also used. Spanish and Portuguese are spoken by Latin American residents and their descendants and sometimes also taught in schools.

== Switzerland ==
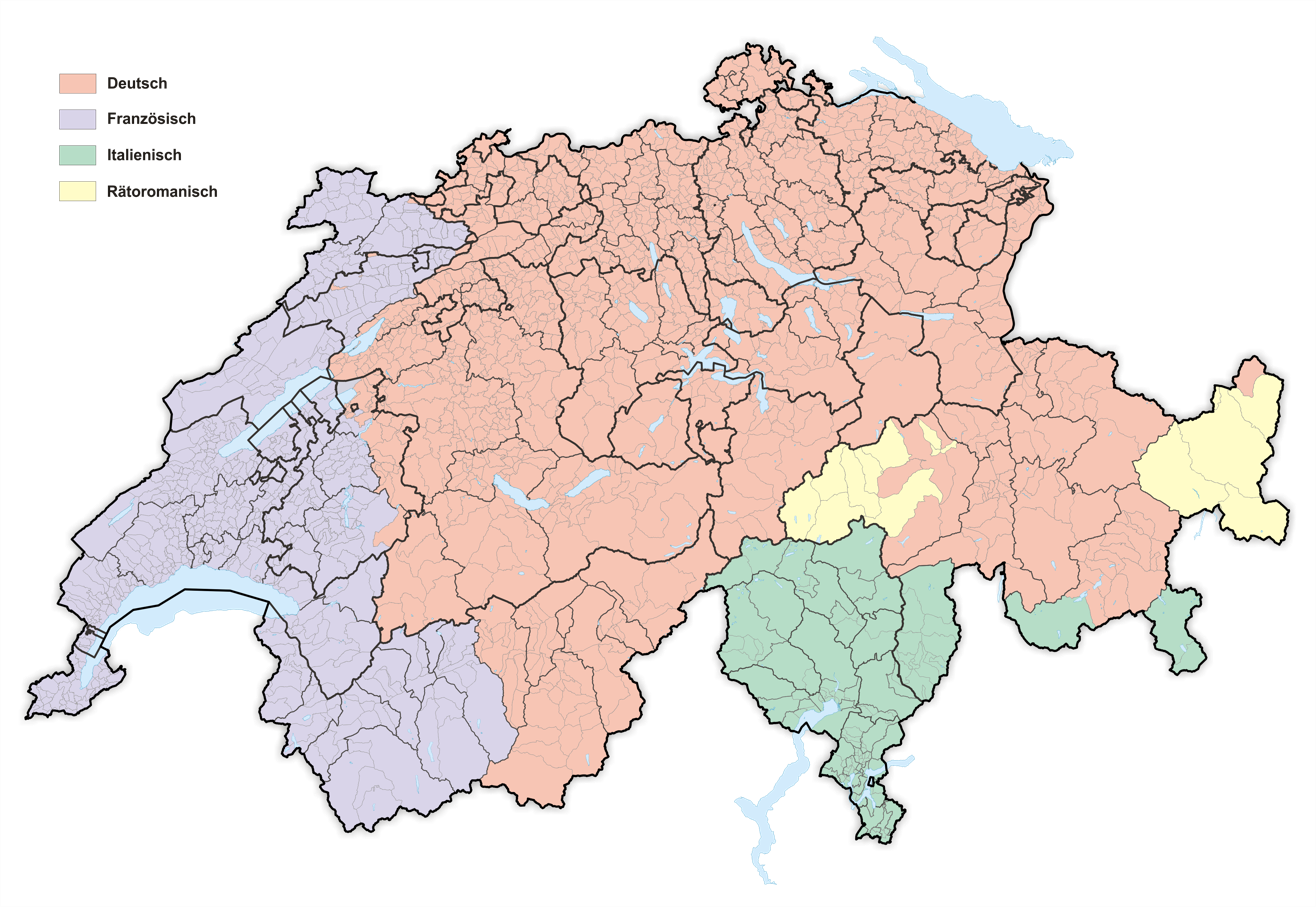
Languages of Switzerland (2026), red German, blue French, green Italian, yellow Romansh

From 1850 until 2000, Switzerland had a census every 10 years. Beginning in 2010, they switched to a yearly system which used a combination of municipal citizen records and a limited number of surveys. Data on the main language spoken by citizens and non-citizen residents has been collected since at least 1970. Of the four official languages, German is the most commonly spoken, with 64.94% of the total population speaking it in 1970 and 63.67% in 2000. French was spoken by 18.09% in 1970 and 20.38% in 2000, while Italian was 11.86% in 1970 and 6.46% in 2000. The fourth national language, Romansh was spoken by just 0.8% in 1970 and 0.48% in 2000. In the 2000 census, English (1.01%), Spanish (1.06%), Portuguese (1.23%), Serbian and Croatian (1.42%) and Albanian (1.30%) were all spoken by significantly more residents than Romansh.

Selected languages from the 1970 to 2000 census are given in the following table:

Census	German	French	Italian	Romansh	English	Dutch	Spanish	Slavic (Except Czech and Slovak)	Czech and Slovak
1970	4,071,289	1,134,010	743,760	50,339	32,509	11,935	123,708	30,429	13,028
1980	4,140,901	1,172,502	622,226	51,128	38,494	13,228	118,169	65,779	14,570
1990	4,374,694	1,321,695	524,116	39,632	60,786	11,895	116,818	119,541	8,552
2000	4,640,359	1,485,056	470,961	35,095	73,425	11,840	77,506	120,853	7,462

== Syria ==
Arabic is an official language of Syria. Several modern Arabic dialects are used in everyday life, most notably Levantine in the west and Mesopotamian in the northeast. Kurdish (in its Kurmanji form) is widely spoken in the Kurdish regions of Syria. Armenian and Turkish (South Azeri dialect) are spoken among the Armenian and Turkmen minorities.

Aramaic was the lingua franca of the region before the advent of Arabic, and it is still spoken among Assyrians, and Classical Syriac still used as the liturgical language of various Syriac Christian denominations. Most remarkably, Western Neo-Aramaic is still spoken in the village of Ma'loula as well as two neighboring villages, 35 miles (56 km) northeast of Damascus. Many educated Syrians also speak English and French languages.

== Turkey ==
Mother Tongue in Turkey
Mother Tongue	Percentage
Turkish	84.54
Kurmanji	11.97
Arabic	1.38
Zazaki	1.01
Other Turkic languages	0.28
Balkan languages	0.23
Laz	0.12
Circassian	0.11
Armenian	0.07
Caucasian languages	0.07
Greek	0.06
Nordic Languages	0.04
West European languages	0.03
Jewish languages	0.01
Other	0.09

== Turkmenistan ==
People in Turkmenistan (when it was still a part of the Russian Empire) were enumerated by native tongue in the 1897 Russian Empire Census. In addition to the Soviet Union enumerating people by ethnicity for its entire existence, Turkmenistan also enumerated people by ethnicity in its only post-Soviet census in 1995.

== Ukraine ==
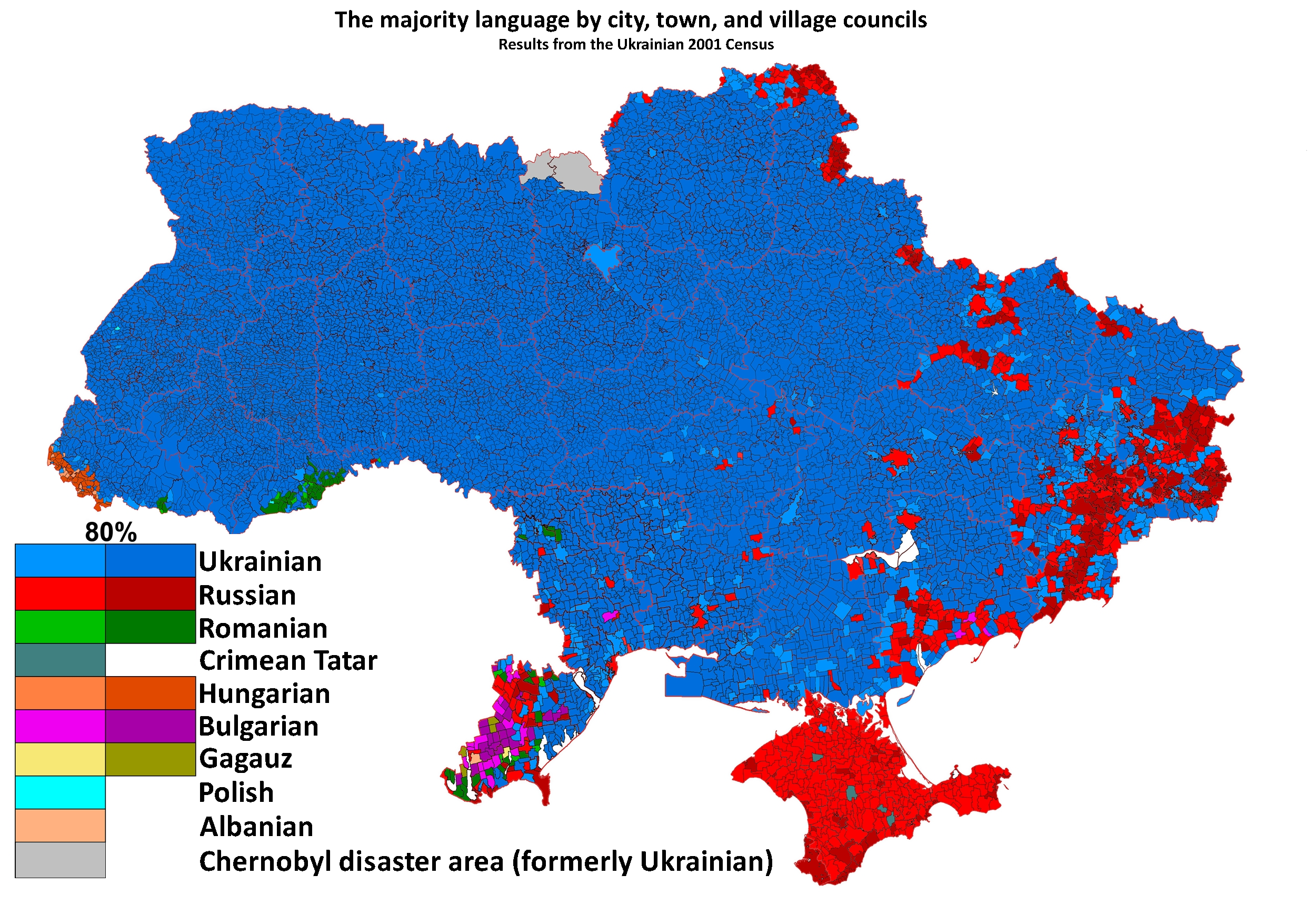
Ethnolinguistic composition of Ukraine.

People in Ukraine (when it was still a part of the Russian Empire) were enumerated by native tongue in the 1897 Russian Empire Census. In addition to the Soviet Union enumerating people by ethnicity for its entire existence, Ukraine also enumerated people by ethnicity and native language in its only post-Soviet census in 2001.

Native language of the population of Ukraine according to the 2001 census.
Language	Number of speakers	Percent of population
Ukrainian	32,577,468	67.53%
Russian	14,273,670	29.59%
Crimean Tatar	231,382	0.48%
Moldovan	185,032	0.38%
Hungarian	161,618	0.34%
Romanian	142,671	0.30%
Bulgarian	134,396	0.28%
Belarusian	56,249	0.12%
Armenian	51,847	0.11%
Gagauz	23,765	0.05%
Romani	22,603	0.05%
Other language	178,764	0.38%
Did not answer	201,437	0.42%

== United States ==
Data on language spoken at home and English-speaking ability of individuals age five and older are currently collected in the American Community Survey (an ongoing statistical survey by the U.S. Census Bureau, sent to approximately 250,000 addresses monthly, or 3 million per year).

A variety of questions on language use were asked in the censuses from 1890 to 1970. These correspond to the different political purposes and policies for which the data were used. For example, early 20th century questions about mother tongue were used to assess the ethnic or racial background of the population, while the current purpose is to calculate the size of the Limited English Proficient population.

The following three-part question on language spoken at home and English speaking ability was asked on the census long form in 1980, 1990, and 2000, and is the same question asked in the American Community Survey. The data are used for enforcing the Voting Rights Act, determining Department of Education funding for English Language Learners, and implementing language access policies.

a. Does this person speak a language other than English at home?
- Yes
- No
b. What is this language? (For example: Korean, Italian, Spanish, Vietnamese)
c. How well does this person speak English?
- Very well
- Well
- Not well
- Not at all

The coding operations used by the Census Bureau puts the reported answers from the question "What is this language?" into 382 language categories of single languages or language families. These categories represent the most commonly spoken languages other than English at home in the U.S. Due to small sample counts, data tabulations are not generally available for all 382 detailed languages. Instead, the Census Bureau collapses languages into smaller sets. These sets of languages were originally developed following the 1970 Census and are grouped linguistically and geographically.

As of 2014, the simplest collapse recodes the 382 language codes into four major language groups: Spanish; Other Indo-European languages; Asian and Pacific Island languages; and All Other languages. A more detailed collapsing puts the 382 codes into 39 languages and language groups.

== Uzbekistan ==
People in Uzbekistan (when it was still a part of the Russian Empire) were enumerated by native tongue in the 1897 Russian Empire Census. The Soviet Union (to which Uzbekistan also belonged) enumerated people by ethnicity for its entire existence. Uzbekistan has not conducted any censuses at all since 1989.

== Vatican City ==
Vatican City enumerated people by ethnicity in 1948.

Its official language is Latin.

== Vietnam ==
People in Vietnam were enumerated by ethnicity in 1979, 1989, 1999, 2009 and 2014.

== Yemen ==
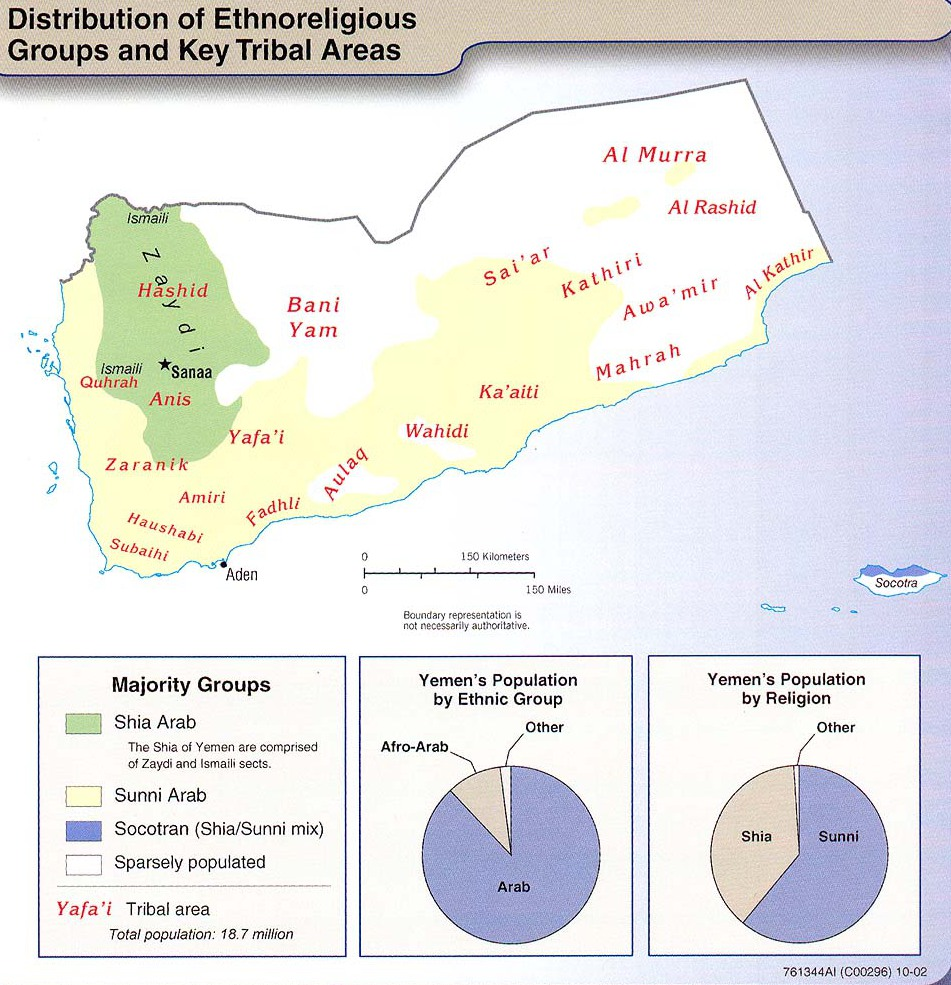
Ethnoreligious composition of Yemen in 2002.

Yemen enumerated its population by ethnicity in 1994. The British Colony of Aden (which is within Yemen's current borders) enumerated its population by ethnicity in 1946 and 1955.

== Zambia ==
Zambia's official language is English.

== Zimbabwe ==
Zimbabwe has 10 different official languages. They are Shona, English, Ndebele, Xhosa, Chewa, Venda, Southern Sotho, Tswana, Tsonga and Tonga.

== See also ==
- Demographics
- Demography
- Population and housing censuses by country
- Linguistic demography
- Race and ethnicity in censuses

== Footnotes ==
By ISO 639-3 code
Enter an ISO code to find the corresponding language article.
