= Aone van Engelenhoven =

Dutch linguist and anthropologist (born 1962)

Aone van Engelenhoven (born 1962) is a Dutch linguist and anthropologist who teaches at Leiden University. He conducts research in the field of linguistics and anthropology, with a focus on smaller languages from Indonesia. He has carried out extensive research on the languages and traditions of Maluku and East Timor.

== Education and career ==
Van Engelenhoven was educated at the Leiden University, where he graduated with a master's degree in comparative linguistics in 1987. He wrote a PhD dissertation on the description of the Leti language in 1995. He started as a lecturer of Austronesian languages in 1993 at his alma mater.

In 2007, van Engelenhoven accidentally discovered a virtually extinct language called Rusenu while studying another endangered language from East Timor called Makuva.

== Publications ==
- Concealment, Maintenance and Renaissance: language and ethnicity in the Moluccan community in the Netherlands (2002)
- Leti, a language of Southwest Maluku (2004)
- The position of Makuva among the Austronesian languages of East Timor and Southwest Maluku (2009)
- Searching the Invariant: Semiotactic Explorations into Meaning (2011) ISBN 978-3862880362
- The Spoor of the Mythical Sailfish (2013)
