= Oirata–Makasae languages =

Family of Papuan languages

Oirata–Makasae
- Eastern Timor
- Geographic distribution: Timor-Leste, Kisar
- Linguistic classification: Trans–New Guinea ?: Berau Gulf ?; West Bomberai?; Timor–Alor–Pantar; Oirata–Makasae
- Subdivisions: Oirata–Fataluku; Makasae

Language codes
- Glottolog: east2520

The Oirata–Makasae, or Eastern Timor, languages are a small family of Papuan languages spoken in eastern Timor and the neighboring island of Kisar.

== Languages ==
Mandala et al. (2011) found that Fataluku and Oirata are closer to each other than they are to Makasai:

- Makasai (including Makalero dialect)
- Oirata–Fataluku
  - Fataluku (Rusenu perhaps belongs here)
  - Oirata

Fataluku has high dialect diversity, and may be more than a single language, for example with Rusenu. An additional Makuv'a (Lovaea) branch was once assumed for East Timor, but that appears to be a heavily Papuan-influenced Austronesian language.

The fourth Papuan language spoken in East Timor, Bunak, is more distantly related. It is currently unknown if they are closer to each other or to the Alor–Pantar languages; all are clearly related. Together they form a branch of the West Bomberai languages of mainland New Guinea.

== Classification ==
Ross (2005) reconstructed first- and second-person pronouns for proto–East Timor:

	proto-ET	Oirata (object)	Fataluku	Makasai
1SG	*ani	an-te (ani)	ani	ani
2SG	*ai	aa-te/ee-te (ee)	e	ai
1EXCL	*ini	in-te (in)	ini	ini
1INCL	*api	ap-te (ap)	afi	fi
2PL	*i	ii-te (ii)	i	i

Mandala et al. (2011) reconstruct five vowels, *a, *e, *i, *o, *u, and the following consonants, based on 200 cognate sets:

	Labial	Alveolar	Velar	Glottal
Nasal	*m	*n		
Occlusive	*p	*t	*k	*ʔ
Fricative		*s		
Sonorant	*w	*l, *r		

*h and *j appear at the level of proto-Oirata–Fataluku.
