= Rusenu language =

Papuan language of eastern East Timor

Rusenu
- Region: eastern East Timor
- Extinct: (date missing)
- Language family: Trans–New Guinea ?: West Bomberai ?; Timor–Alor–Pantar; Eastern Timor; Fataluku ?; Rusenu

Language codes
- ISO 639-3: None (mis)
- Glottolog: None

Rusenu is a virtually extinct Papuan language first documented in 2007. It was spoken in the east of what is now East Timor.

Rusenu was first described accidentally by the Dutch-Timorese linguist Aone van Engelenhoven, who was studying a language called Makuva, thought since the 1950s to be extinct. Just as he was about to leave for the Netherlands, he was informed about the existence of a language called Rusenu. There was said to be only one elderly woman "who had some knowledge of it." He gave his tape recorder to his informant, who subsequently interviewed the woman and her son. She remembered a nursery rhyme, which she was unable to interpret (as was her entire tribe). Her son could count to ten in the language. After Van Engelenhoven analysed and transcribed the recording, he concluded that Rusenu, "albeit remotely related to Fataluku, is a separate language." The speakers of Rusenu were also claimed to have been responsible for the several thousand years old rock drawings on East Timor, in the Ile Kére Kére caves.

Van Engelenhoven reports the identification of the language triggered rumors about other languages that have survived to date as cants, and hopes to discover some more unknown East Timorese languages in the near future.
