= Language Spoken at Home =

Data set published by the United States Census Bureau on languages in the United States

Language Spoken at Home is a data set published by the United States Census Bureau on languages in the United States. It is based on a three-part language question asked about all household members who are five years old or older. The first part asks if the person speaks a language other than English at home. If the answer is "yes", the respondent is asked what that language is. The third part of the question asks how well the person speaks English ("Very well", "Well", "not well", "Not at all").

The three-part question was first asked in 1980; It replaced a question about mother tongue. In 2000, the language question appeared on the long-form questionnaire which was distributed to 1 out of 6 households. After the long form census was eliminated (after the 2000 census), the language question was moved to the American Community Survey (ACS). The language questions used by the US Census changed numerous times during 20th century. Changes in the language questions are tied to the changing ideologies of language in addition to changing language policies.

== Data published ==
The published data varies in the amount of detail provided each year.

In 2000 and 1990, language spoken was a part of Summary File 3. For the 2000 census, data was published for 30 languages, chosen for their nationwide distribution, and 10 language groupings (see list below). Data from households which report languages other than the 30 are reported under the language groupings. Thus, languages which are widespread in certain areas of the country but not nationally get put together, even in block level data. Lithuanian, and Welsh are simply "Other Indo-European languages," Yoruba and Swahili are simply "African languages," and Indonesian and Hakka are simply "Other Asian languages." Several locally very well represented languages, such as Punjabi and Pennsylvania German, are collated into smaller groupings. Native North American languages besides Navajo are also collated, though they are reported on several geographic levels in another data set.

For the 2009-2013 ACS data, detailed information was provided on over 300 languages. In addition to the number of speakers reported for each language, the count of speakers whose English speaking ability is less than "very well" is also reported.

Updated information is available via the Census Bureau's American Community Survey Data page.

== Data usage ==
Statistics on English-speaking ability and language spoken at home are used by the Justice Department in the implementation of the Voting Rights Act and to allocate funds for to schools for programs for English Language Learners. Federal and local governments, as well as non-governmental and private interests also use these statistics.

== Languages and language groupings ==
Language spoken at home summary (U.S. Census 2000)
Language	%
English	82.105%
Spanish	10.710%
Chinese (all varieties of Chinese incl.)	0.78%
French (incl. Patois, Cajun)	0.627%
German	0.527%
Tagalog (Filipino)	0.467%
Vietnamese	0.385%
Italian	0.384%
Korean	0.341%
Russian	0.269%
Polish	0.254%
Arabic	0.234%
Portuguese or Portuguese Creole	0.215%
Albanian	0.201%
Japanese	0.182%
French Creole	0.173%
Other Indic languages (including Dravidian languages?)	0.167%
African languages	0.160%
Other Asian languages	0.152%
Greek	0.139%
Other Indo-European languages	0.242%
Hindi	0.121%
Persian	0.119%
Other Slavic languages	0.115%
Urdu	0.100%
Dutch (and Afrikaans)	0.096%
Gujarati	0.090%
Other Native American languages	0.078%
Armenian	0.077%
Hebrew	0.074%
Mon, Khmer	0.069%
Yiddish	0.068%
Navajo	0.068%
Hmong	0.064%
North Germanic languages	0.062%
Lao	0.057%
Thai	0.046%
Hungarian	0.045%
All other and unspecified	0.055%

- English
- Spanish or Spanish Creole
- French (incl. Patois, Cajun)
- Nepali
- German
- Italian
- Portuguese or Portuguese Creole
- Romanian
- Yiddish
- Dutch (and Afrikaans) (West Germanic languages)
- Scandinavian languages
- Greek
- Russian
- Polish
- Albanian
- Croatian
- Serbian
- Other Slavic languages
- Armenian
- Persian
- Bengali
- Gujarati
- Hindi
- Urdu
- Kurdish
- Marathi
- Other Indic languages (besides Gujarati, Hindi, Bengali, Urdu and Marathi)
- Other Indo-European languages (besides the above 20 languages and 3 groupings)
- Tamil (South Indian - Dravidian)
- Malayalam (South Indian - Dravidian)
- Kannada (South Indian - Dravidian)
- Telugu (South Indian - Dravidian)
- Chinese (all varieties, including "Formosan" (i.e. Taiwanese Hokkien))
- Japanese
- Korean
- Mon-Khmer, Cambodian
- Miao, Hmong
- Filipino, (including Tagalog and Ilocano)
- Thai
- Laotian
- Vietnamese
- Other Asian languages (besides the above 11 languages)
- Navajo
- Other Native North American languages
- Hungarian
- Arabic
- Hebrew
- African languages
- Assyrian language (including Suret and Turoyo)
- Other and unspecified languages

== See also ==
- Languages of the United States
- Languages in censuses
- Ancestry (United States Census)
- Historical racial and ethnic demographics of the United States
- Race and ethnicity in the United States census
- List of U.S. communities where English is not the majority language spoken at home
