= Makalero =

Papuan language of Timor-Leste

- Native to: Timor-Leste
- Region: Timor Island, eastern end around Baucau and inland, west of Fataluku, from northern to southern coast in a dialect chain.
- Native speakers: 8,000 (2017)
- Language family: Trans–New Guinea ?: West Bomberai ?; Timor–Alor–Pantar; Eastern Timor; Makalero

Official status
- Recognised minority language in: Timor-Leste

Language codes
- ISO 639-3: mjb
- Glottolog: makl1245
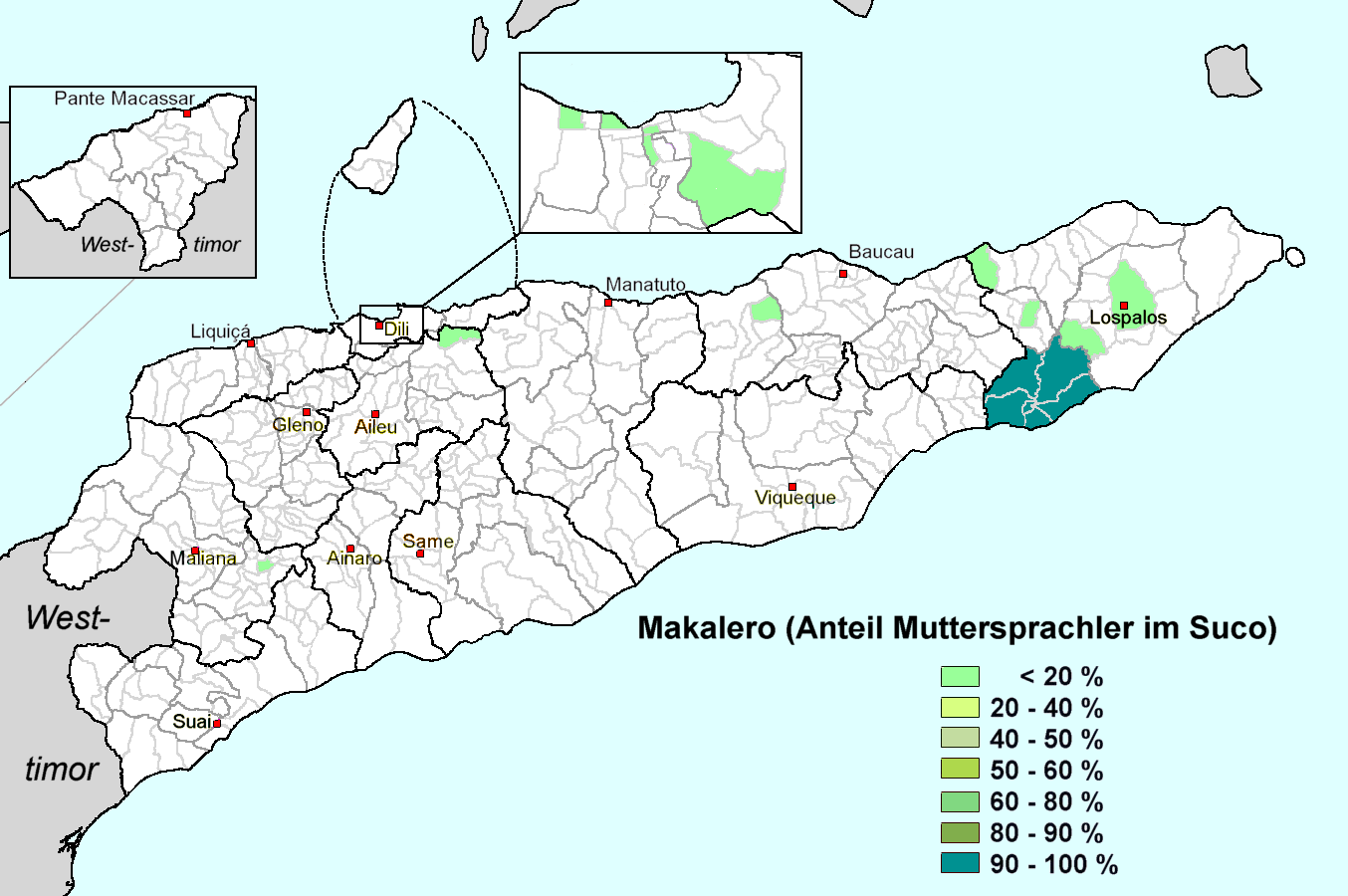
- Distribution of Makalero mother-tongue speakers in Timor-Leste
- Coordinates: 8°39′S 126°30′E

Makalero or Maklere is a Papuan language spoken in the Lautém district of Timor-Leste. It was previously considered to be a dialect of Makasae, but is nowadays seen as a separate language, both by its speakers and linguists.

== Phonology ==
The data in this section are from Huber (2017).

=== Vowels ===
Makalero has five vowel phonemes. Most long vowels occur in predictable contexts; thus Huber argues long vowels are marginal phonemes at best.

Monophthong phonemes
	Front	Central	Back
Close	i (iː)		u (uː)
Mid	e (eː)		o (oː)
Open		a (aː)	

Syllables are commonly CV; some are CVC. Epenthetic vowels are often inserted between series of two consonants, and echo vowels are often added to the end of phonological phrases.

=== Consonants ===
Makalero has 11 native consonant phonemes.

Consonant phonemes
	Labial	Alveolar	Post- alveolar	Velar	Glottal
Plosive	p	t	d̠	k	ʔ
Fricative	f	s			
Nasal	m	n			
Trill		r			
Lateral		l			

== Grammar ==
All information in this section is from Huber 2011.

=== Lexical Categories ===
Makalero does not have a definitive noun/verb distinction. Nearly all content words can be heads of NPs as well as predicates. In the following examples, isit can be a predicate or a nominal.

asi-atupusi hai nomo isit
1S:POSS-belly NSIT NEG ill
'my belly did not hurt anymore'

Ki-isit=ee hai k-ua-misa
3:POSS-ill=DEF NSIT 3:UND-on.top:RED-go.up
'His illness got worse' (lit. went up on top)

Content words must be bimoraic, unlike function words, which may be monomoraic.

=== Valency ===
Makalero has only avalent verbs and divalent verbs. There are no trivalent verbs; instead, biclausal constructions are used.

The avalent verbs are adverbial verbs such as atanana 'first,' hana’e 'a long time ago,' aire’ 'now,' kamunei 'tomorrow,' mu’it 'for a long time,' raine’ 'last night,' and tone’ 'maybe.'

Divalent verbs allow for a subject and either an object or complement.

In the following example, Kiloo is the subject and ani is the object.

Kiloo ani pase
3S 1S beat
'He beat me'

In the following example, ani is the subject and rau-rau is the complement.

Ani mei=ni rau-rau-kena
1S take=LNK1 RDL-good-see:BD
'I see it very well'

== Numerals ==
1	unu	11	ruu resi nu
2	loloi	12	ruu resi loloi
3	lolitu	13	ruu resi lolitu
4	faata	14	ruu resi faata
5	lima	15	ruu resi lima
6	douhu		
7	fitu		
8	afo		
9	siwa		
10	ruru-u		
