= Pulau-Pulau Terselatan =

District in Southwest Maluku Regency, Maluku, Indonesia

Coordinates: 8.0719°S 127.1620°E

Pulau-Pulau Terselatan (southern islands) is a district (Kecamatan) in the Maluku Barat Daya regency (kabupaten) of the province of Maluku, Indonesia. The district includes the islands of Kisar and Romang, with the surrounding small islands of Njata, Mitan, Tellang, Limtutu, Loud, Kital, Maopora and Djuha; all lie to the east of the larger island of Wetar. The main town is Wonreli on Kisar Island.

Pulau-Pulau Terselatan had 17,899 inhabitants in 2010, divided into the twelve villages (Kelurahan) - Lekloor (1,271 inhabitants in 2010), Oirata Barat (555), Oirata Timur (1,011), Abusur (803), Kota Lama (833), Wonreli (6,652), Nomaha (640), Pur Pura (398), Lebelau (1,852), Jerusu (2,138), Hila (Romang) (1,262) and Solath (484).
