= Oirata language =

Timor–Alor–Pantar language

Oirata
- Native to: Indonesia
- Region: Maluku Islands (Kisar, Ambon)
- Native speakers: (1,200 cited 1987)
- Language family: Trans–New Guinea ?: West Bomberai ?; Timor–Alor–Pantar; Eastern Timor; Oirata–Fataluku; Oirata

Language codes
- ISO 639-3: oia
- Glottolog: oira1263
- ELP: Oirata

Oirata or Woirata (also known as Maaro) is a Timor–Alor–Pantar language spoken on the island of Kisar in Indonesia, and by some people in Ambon. Ethnologue reports an SIL figure of 1,200 speakers from 1987. It is closely related to Fataluku, of which it is sometimes considered to be a dialect.

== Phonology ==
=== Vowels ===
Oirata has five vowels:

Oirata vowels
	Front	Back
Close	i	u
Close-mid	e	o
Open	a	

=== Consonants ===
Oirata has 13 consonants:

Oirata consonants
		Labial	Alveolar	Palatal	Glottal
Plosive	voiceless	p	t		ʔ
Plosive	voiced		d		
Fricative	voiceless	f			h
Fricative	voiced	v			
Nasal		m	n		
Approximant		w	l	j	
Trill			r		
