= Ernst Rodenwaldt =

German racial hygienist, university teacher and military physician (1878–1965)

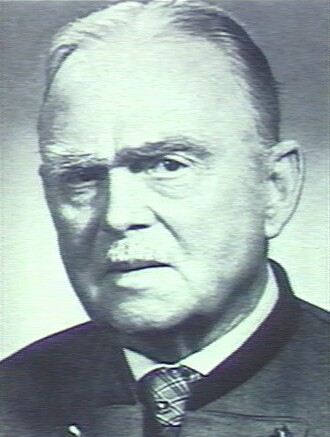

Ernst Robert Carl Rodenwaldt (August 5, 1878 – June 4, 1965) was a German hygienist, eugenicist, medical officer, and malariologist who worked in German colonies in Africa and in the Dutch East Indies. He had a special interest in geography and the distribution of diseases which made him interested in what he called geomedicine.

He also served as surgeon for the Wehrmacht during the Third Reich. He researched and wrote on the anopheline mosquitoes of Indonesia and, later in life, edited an atlas of epidemic diseases, Welt-Seuchen-Atlas or World Atlas of Epidemic Diseases which was published in three volumes.

== Life and work ==
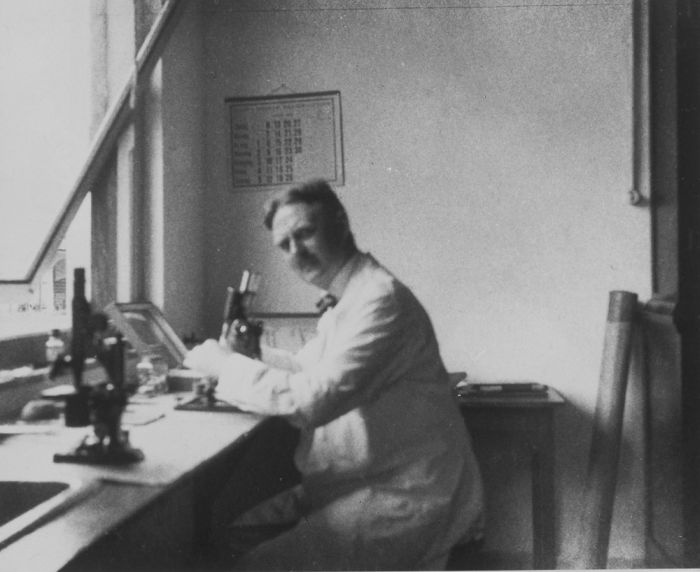
Rodenwaldt in Batavia, c. 1920

Rodenwaldt was born in Berlin to college professor Robert and Katharina Luther. His brother Gerhart became a famous archaeologist. After studies at the Köllnisches Gymnasium and a one-year service in the Guard Fusilier Regiment during 1897–98, he went to study medicine at the Kaiser Wilhelm Academy in Berlin from 1897 and became a military doctor in 1903. Among his inspirations he counted Siegfried Passarge.

He received a doctorate from the Friedrichs University, Halle in 1904 and conducted research on tropical nematode parasites and worked in Hamburg before being posted to German Togo in 1910. Here he examined tropical infectious diseases and discovered a connection between the closing and opening of the Anecho lagoon and malaria outbreaks.

In 1915 he became a staff physician with the army and worked on malaria, typhus and cholera in Turkey and Asia Minor during World War I. He habilitated in Heidelberg in 1919 with studies on malaria. From 1921 he worked with in the Dutch East Indies and in 1928 he was an inspector of public health. He was informed of filariasis in the delta of the Serajoe river in Java by Steffen Lambert Brug.

He then examined the intensity of infection and identified that the parasites were spread by mosquitoes that liked the backwaters of the flood plains following the rains. The washoff from the deforested hills led to the formation of new channels and the creation of stagnant pools where the mosquito larvae bred among the roots of Pistia stratiotes.

He noted that just a few kilometers from the delta the people did not suffer from any infection. Along with Nicolaas Swellengrebel he published on the anopheline mosquitoes of the region. He became a foreign member of the NSDAP in 1933 and when he returned to Germany, he joined the Christian Albrechts University in Kiel as a head of hygiene in 1934.

In 1934, he attended the conference of the International Federation of Eugenic Organizations held in Zurich along with Ernst Rüdin and Lothar Tirala. He gave lectures on racial hygiene and purity both at the university and to the public. He served in the Berlin-based Military Medical Academy during World War II and headed its Institute for Tropical Medicine and Tropical Hygiene from 1940.

He took an interest in race and anthropology and was an editor for the journal Archiv für Rassen und Gesellschaftsbiologie. At the end of the war he was held prisoner of war in Windermere. There, he became the head doctor of a German prisoner of war hospital after a few months.

In early 1946, at the insistence of his English colleagues, he was released to Germany, where he learned that he had already been dismissed from his position as a professor of hygiene by the American military government at the end of 1945 due to his involvement with the National Socialists. After being classified as a "lesser offender" (Minderbelasteter) in the first instance of the denazification process, he was finally acquitted in a second trial in 1948.

He made use of his publication on anthropological studies in Java on the Mestizos of Kisar to support the idea that he appreciated mixed race people. In 1951 he became head of geomedical research at the Heidelberg Academy of Sciences and published a textbook on hygiene along with Richard-Ernst Bader.

A major work was his three volume atlas of epidemic diseases, Welt-Seuchen-Atlas (1952, 1956, 1961), coauthored with H.J. Jusatz. In 1957 he published an autobiography, Ein Tropenarzt erzählt sein Leben ("A tropical physician relates his life"). In 1963 he also contributed to Weltkarten zur Klimakunde ("World Maps of Climatology").

Until his death in 1965, he continued to serve as a consultant for various organizations. He influenced the medical service of the Bundeswehr, was an advisory board member in the Federal Ministry for Economic Cooperation and Development, and was involved in development aid. His biography of Leon Battista Alberti as a renaissance hygienist was published posthumously.
