= Makasae language =

Language spoken in Timor-Leste

Makasae
- Native to: Timor-Leste
- Region: Timor Island, eastern end around Baucau and inland, west of Fataluku, from northern to southern coast in a dialect chain.
- Native speakers: 102,000 (2010 census)
- Language family: Trans–New Guinea ?: West Bomberai ?; Timor–Alor–Pantar; Eastern Timor; Makasae
- Dialects: Sa'ane

Official status
- Recognised minority language in: Timor-Leste

Language codes
- ISO 639-3: mkz
- Glottolog: maka1316
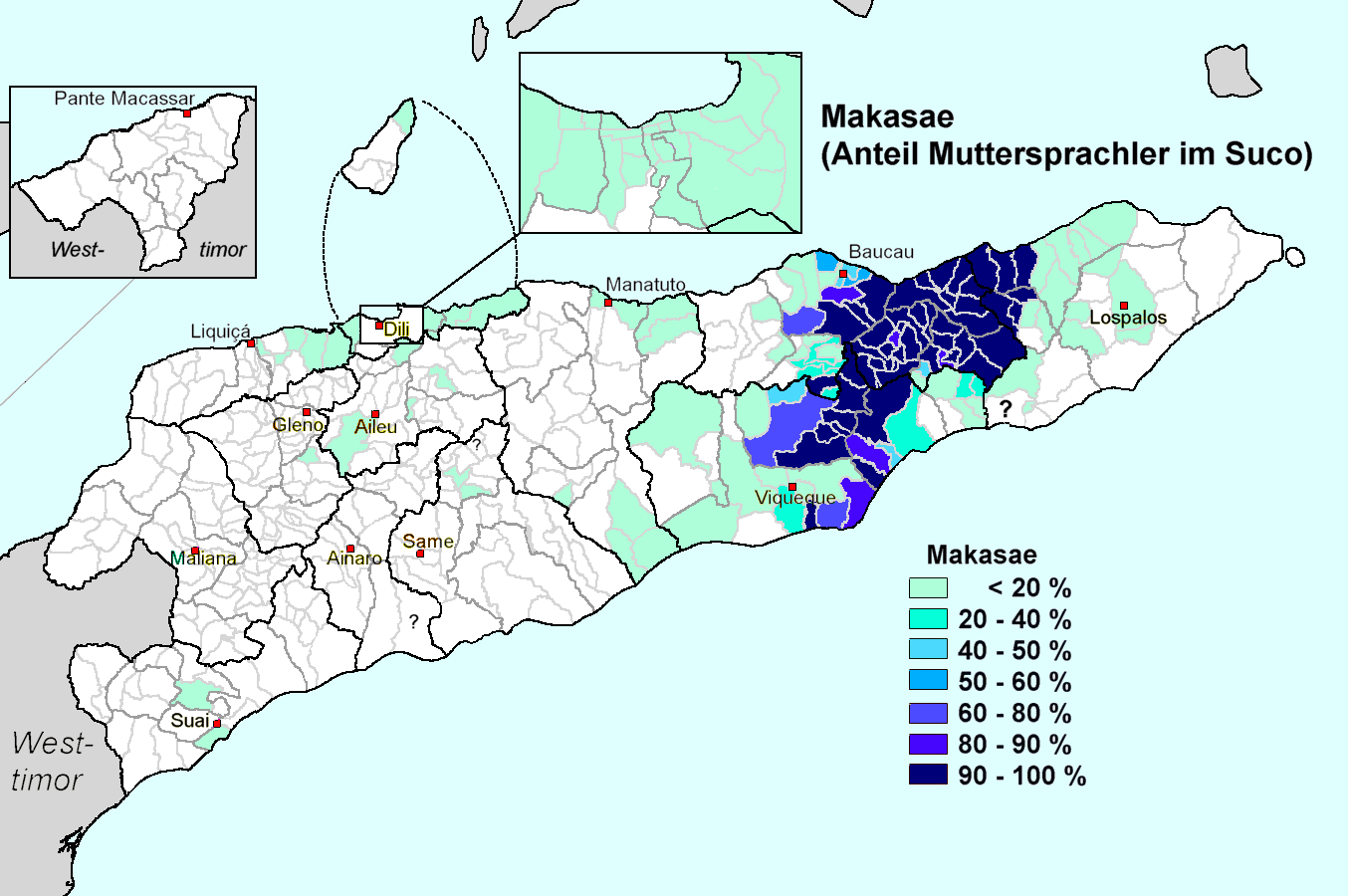
- Distribution of Makasae mother-tongue speakers in Timor-Leste

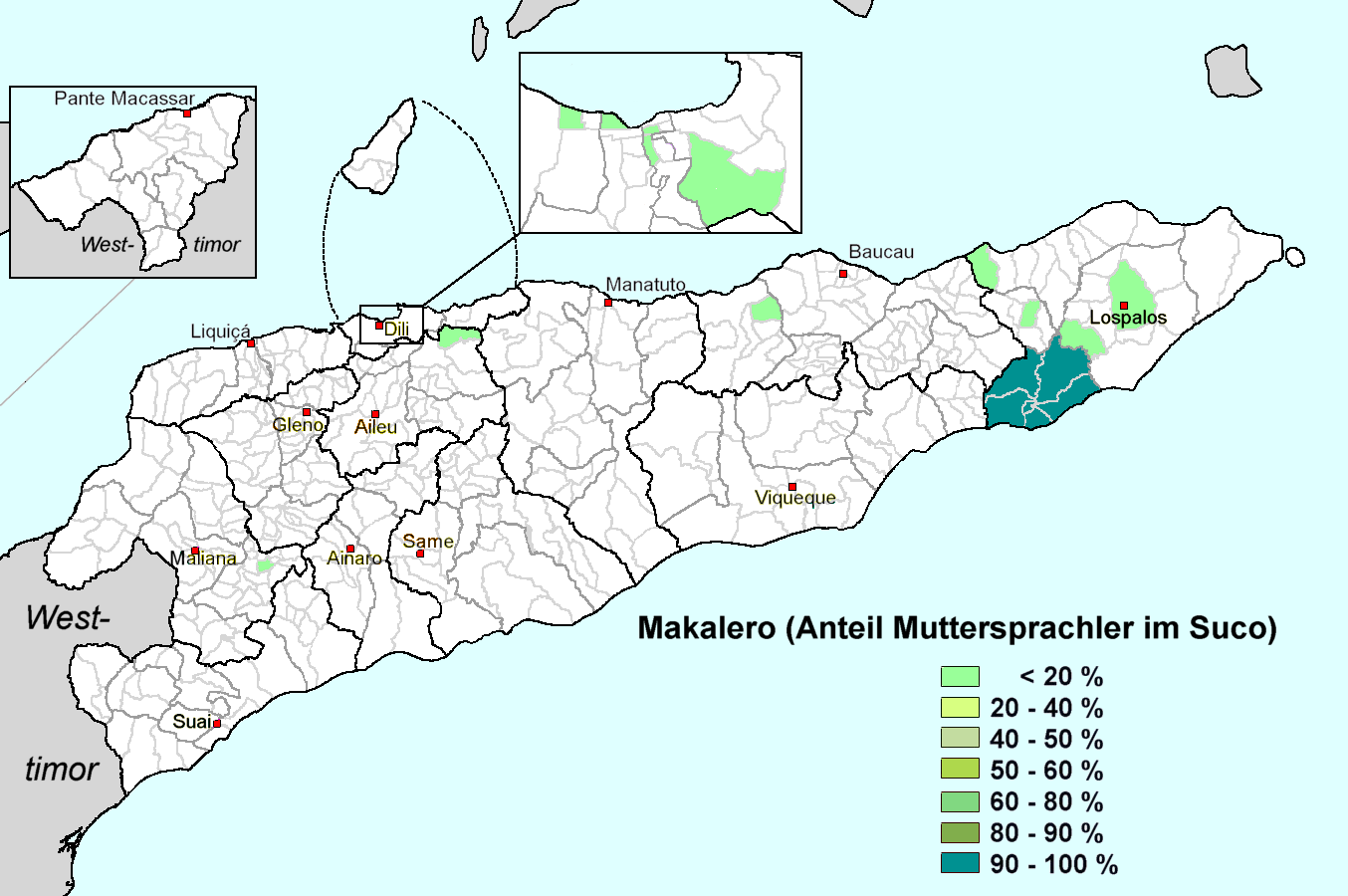
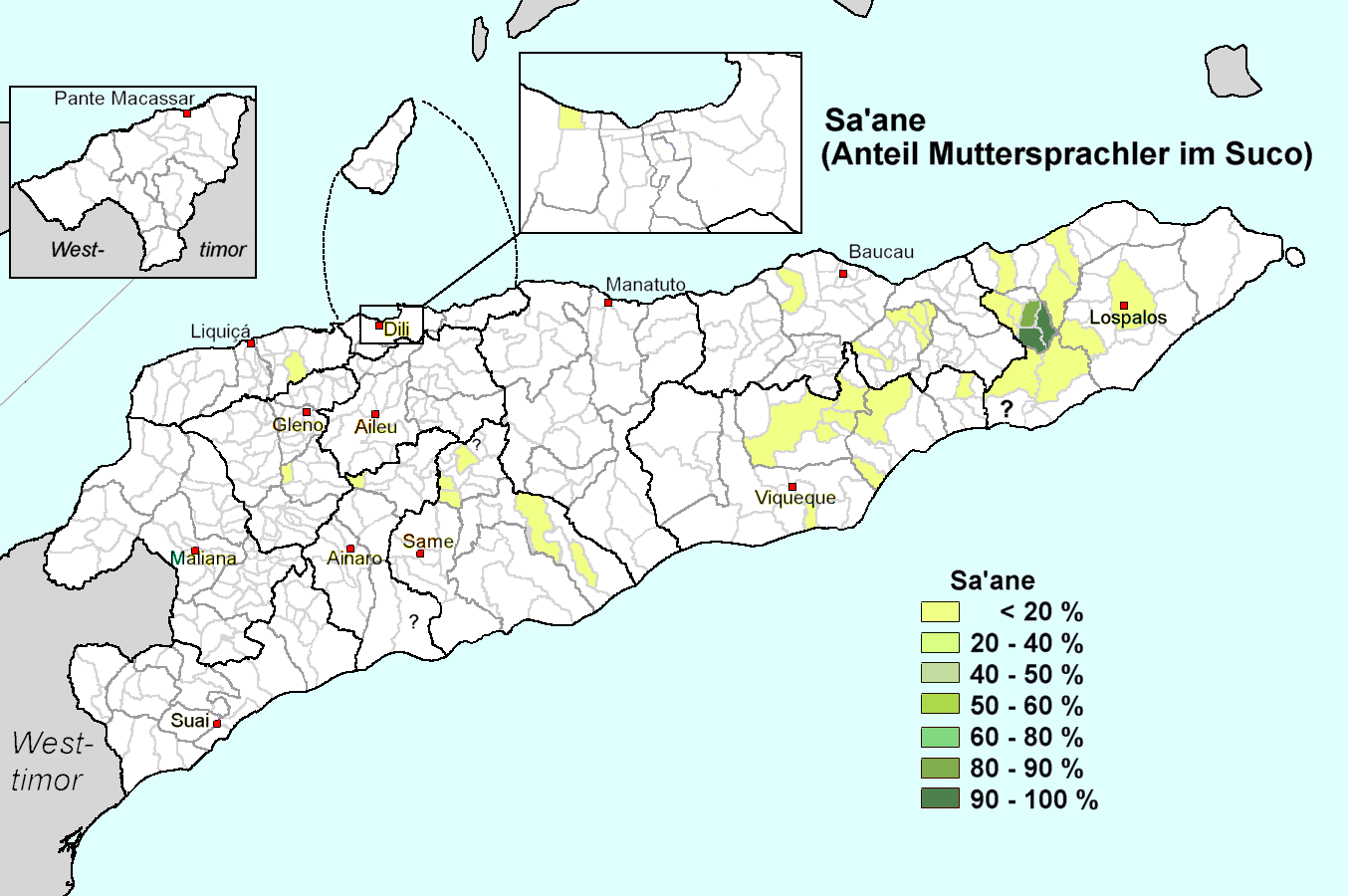
- Distribution of Makalero Distribution of Sa'ane
- Coordinates: 8°39′S 126°30′E

Makasae (also known as Makassai, Macassai, Ma'asae, Makasai) is a Papuan language spoken by about 100,000 people in the eastern part of Timor-Leste, in the districts of Baucau and Viqueque, just to the west of Fataluku. It is the most widely spoken Papuan language west of New Guinea.

== Phonology ==
The data in this section are from Huber (2017).

=== Consonants ===
Native consonant phonemes are shown in the chart below for the Ossu dialect. Borrowed consonants are enclosed in parentheses.

Consonant phonemes
	Labial		Alveolar		Velar		Glottal
Plosive		b	t	d	k	g	ʔ
Fricative	f		s				h
Nasal		m		n			
Lateral				l			
Trill				r			

=== Vowels ===
==== Monophthongs ====
Makasae has five vowel phonemes.

Monophthong phonemes
	Front	Central	Back
Close	i (iː)		u (uː)
Mid	e (eː)		o (oː)
Open		a (aː)	
