= Kisar =

Island in Indonesia

Native name: Yotowawa
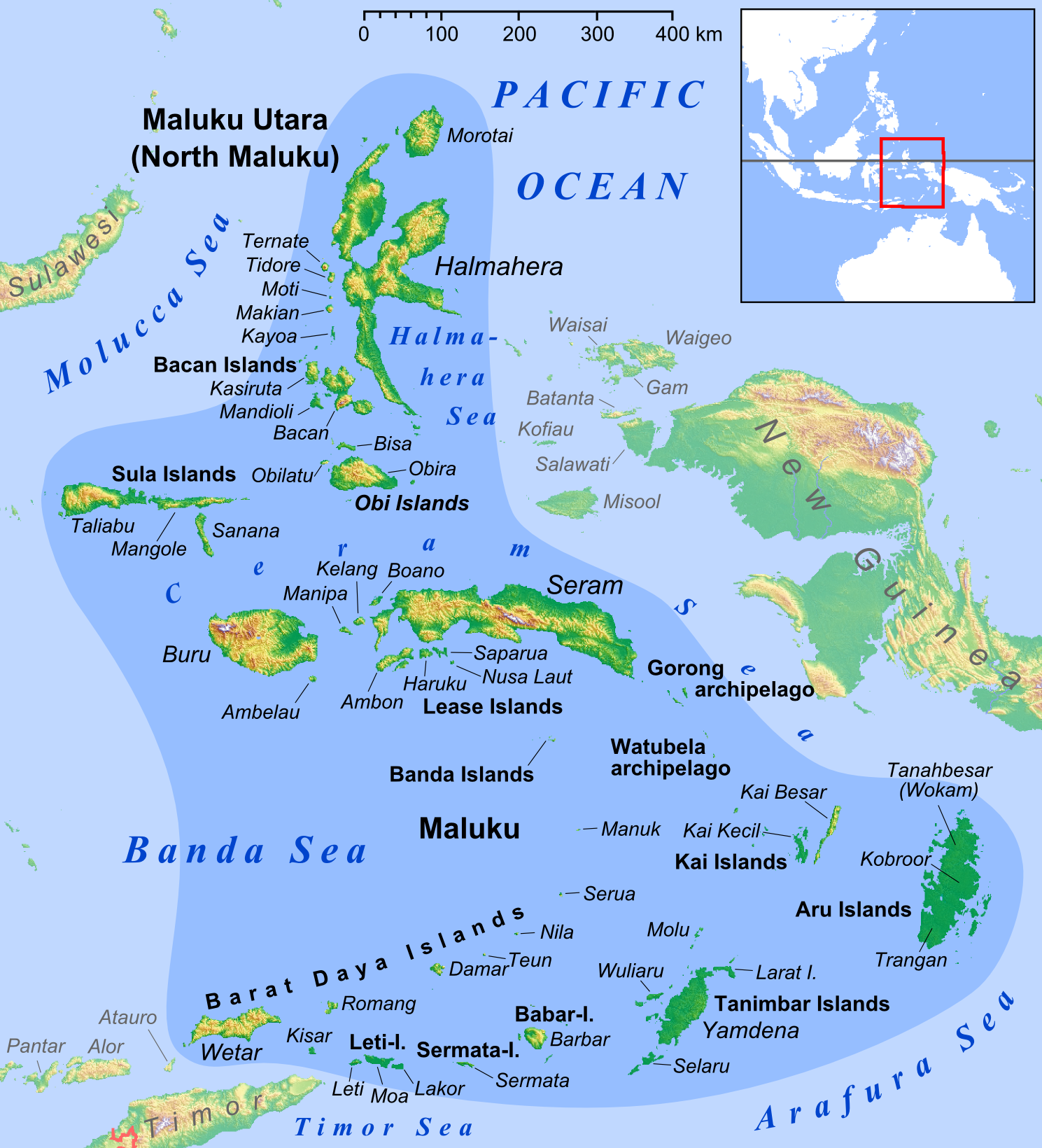
- Kisar in the south of the Maluku Islands as a part of the Southwest Islnds (Maluku Barat Daya)

Geography
- Location: South East Asia
- Coordinates: 8.06°S 127.18°E
- Area: 83.99 km^{2} (32.43 sq mi)

Administration
- Indonesia
- Province: Maluku
- Regency: Southwest Maluku Regency
- District: Kisar Selatan (formerly Pulau-Pulau Terselatan)
- Largest settlement: Wonreli

Demographics
- Population: 14,390 (mid 2025 estimate)
- Pop. density: 171.33/km^{2} (443.74/sq mi)

Kisar, also known as Yotowawa, is a small island in the Southwestern Moluccas in Indonesia, located to the northeast of Timor Island. The island now forms two districts ("North Kisar" and "South Kisar") within the Southwest Islands Regency of Maluku Province. South Kisar District was previously called Kecamatan Pulau Pulau Terselatan and at one time included the larger (but less populated) Roma or Romang Island further north, but this with its own outliers was subsequently split off to form its own district (Kecamatan Kepulauan Roma). The rest of the island forms the North Kisar District (Kecamatan Kisar Utara) within the regency. It is one of the 92 officially listed outlying islands of Indonesia.

Kisar Selatan District covers 65.40 km ^{2} and had 11,022 inhabitants as at mid 2025, while Kisar Utara District covers 18.59 km^{2} and had 3,368 inhabitants as at mid 2025. The principal town in Kisar Selatan is Wonreli, with 6,498 inhabitants as at mid 2024, while the main village in Kisar Utara is Lebelau with 1,991 inhabitants as at mid 2024.

== Geography, geology and ecology ==
Kisar is similar geographically and geologically to the nearby islands of Timor, Leti, and Moa. The interior of the island is hilly, with several small mountains lined roughly east–west. The highest of these, Gunung Taitulu, rises approximately 300 metres (980 ft) above sea level, and from the top, nearby Wetar and Timor are easily seen. The entire island is encircled by a series of rugged limestone cliffs that look like giant stairsteps rising from the coast. These uplifted terraces represent former coral reefs that have been thrust from the sea due to the active tectonics of the region. Those terraces are also gently warped. An uplift rate of the island of approximately 0.5 mm/yr over the past several hundred thousand years has been calculated by obtaining ages of coral samples from the terraces.

The rocks exposed in the interior of the island are primarily composed of low to medium-grade metamorphosed sedimentary rocks, with scattered amphibolites. The metasedimentary rocks are quartz-rich and the amphibolites represent mafic igneous intrusions. Age analyses of detrital minerals, petrology, and geochemistry all indicate that the island belongs geologically with the other islands of the Outer Banda Arc. This series of islands formed when the northern edge of the Australian continent was upthrust in collision with southeast Asia. These islands are paralleled by the Inner Banda Arc, a series of active and extinct volcanic islands, including neighboring Wetar. The islands in the Banda Arc are arranged in a distinct horseshoe shape and represent a young, emerging mountain belt. Thus, Kisar represents one peak of a new mountain range rising from the sea.

The Timor Monitor (Varanus timorensis) is found in Kisar.

== Language ==
The Kisar language (a trade language, also known as Meher or Yotowawa) and the unrelated Oirata language (closely related to Fataluku) are spoken on Kisar.

== History ==
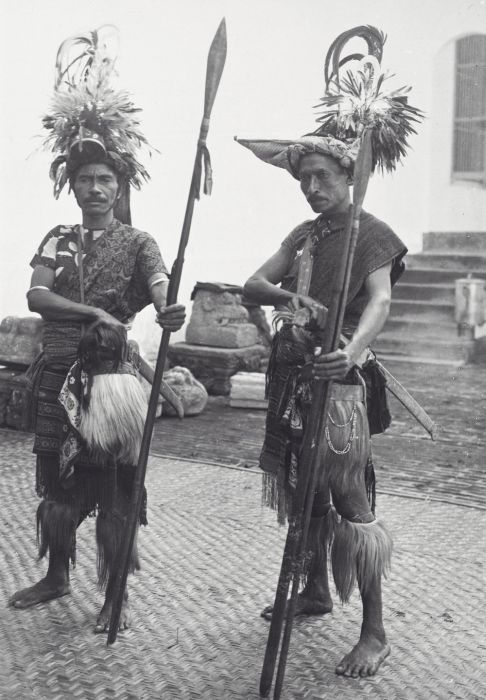
Kisar warriors.

The island was inhabited long before the colonial period. Cave paintings dating back 2,500 years have been found in Kisar after a wide-scale archaeological work.

In 1665 the Dutch VOC built a military base and named the island after the Kisar word for white sand. From the European outpost on Kisar a relatively large Indo Eurasian community developed named the 'Mestizo from Kisar' to this day their descendants live as Rajas and chiefs on Kisar. Surviving family names include: Frans, Parera, Joostenz, Wouthuysen, Caffin, Lerrick, Peelman, Lander, Ruff, Bellmin-Belder, Coenradi, van Delsen, Schilling and Bakker.

In 1795 Kisar was under British rule, in 1803 it was under Dutch/French rule and in 1810 again under English rule. In 1817 Kisar was returned to the Dutch until the outpost was abandoned in 1819. After that time Kisar upheld close ties with their Portuguese, Topasses and Timorese neighbours on Timor.

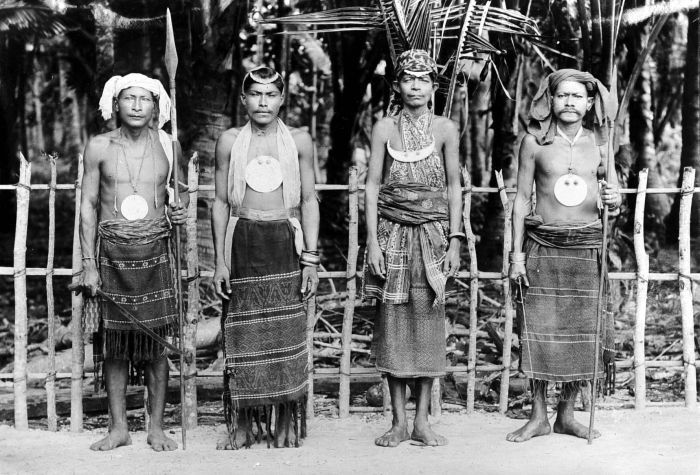
Kisar villagers

After WWII and Indonesia's independence the island was temporarily considered part of the segregated RMS, but ultimately became part of the unitary Indonesian state.

The current and 12th Raja (king) of Kisar, Johannes J. Bakker, succeeded his father Raja Hairmere Philipus Zacharias Bakker. The first Raja Cornelis Bakker, who also ruled Wetar, Roma and Leti island via his brothers, was crowned ca. 1665.

Nowadays the Raja is respected as a traditional dignitary, but has no political power. The present Raja is well educated and for 5 years worked as a government official in nearby East-Timor, when part of Indonesia. There he met his wife Maria Antonette Ribeiru.

Regarding the entry of the Dutch into South Daya Island (PSD), Maluku, community leaders in Kisar, S.D. Mozes, said from the various information he obtained. It is said that the entry of the Dutch into Kisar began with the story of the ancestors of the Kisar people, Perlakuloho. took his sick sister for treatment to Belagar, Pantar, Alor. However, on the way back to Kisar, precisely between Wetar and Kisar islands, Perlakuloho got a boat which turned out to be carrying a Dutch citizen known as Yan de Klein who was having water difficulties to continue his journey.

Therefore, Perlakuloho helped the Dutch and took them to Kisar, with the hope that the Dutch on the ship could help them, should there be an attack from the Portuguese. The fear of a Portuguese attack was justified, because previously a resident of Kisar had killed a Portuguese. The captain of the Dutch ship, Yan de Klein, did not object to the invitation. In subsequent developments, the Dutch flag flew in Kisar which caused the Portuguese to abandon their intention to attack Kisar. Finally, the ship's passengers settled in Kisar (Mestiezen), in fact, Yan Klein married a woman from Kisar. The Dutchman first built the City of Delftshaven in the Old City and the City of Vollenhove on Nama Beach, Kisar. This can be proven by the existence of Dutch heritage forts in both cities.

== Transport ==
Kisar has a small airport called John Becker Airport, near Purpura village on the north side of the island, with flights to Ambon, Moa (one of the Leti Islands) and Kupang. Passenger ships connect Kisar to Ambon, Kupang, and other nearby islands, and there are speed boats to Ambon and Moa.

== Academic study ==
In 1928 the German Professor E. Rodenwaldt published his study "Die Mestizen auf Kisar", "Mikroskopische Beobachtungen an den Haaren der Kisaresen und Kisarbastarde". His work is published in two German language volumes, one volume details measurements and photographs of the observed Mestizos. It contains a family tree showing the very complicated inter-marriages between the descendants of Mestizo families, as well as indicating skin, eye, and hair colour heredity. The study shows a unique natural experiment spanning over two centuries and is considered an essential academic work in the area of human heredity.
