= Makuva language =

Extinct Austronesian language of Timor-Leste

Makuva
- Makuʼa, Lóvaia
- Native to: Timor-Leste
- Native speakers: extinct since 1950s to 56 (2010 census)
- Language family: Austronesian: Malayo-Polynesian; Central–Eastern; Timor–Babar; Southwest Maluku; Makuva

Official status
- Recognised minority language in: Timor-Leste

Language codes
- ISO 639-3: lva
- Glottolog: maku1277
- ELP: Maku'a
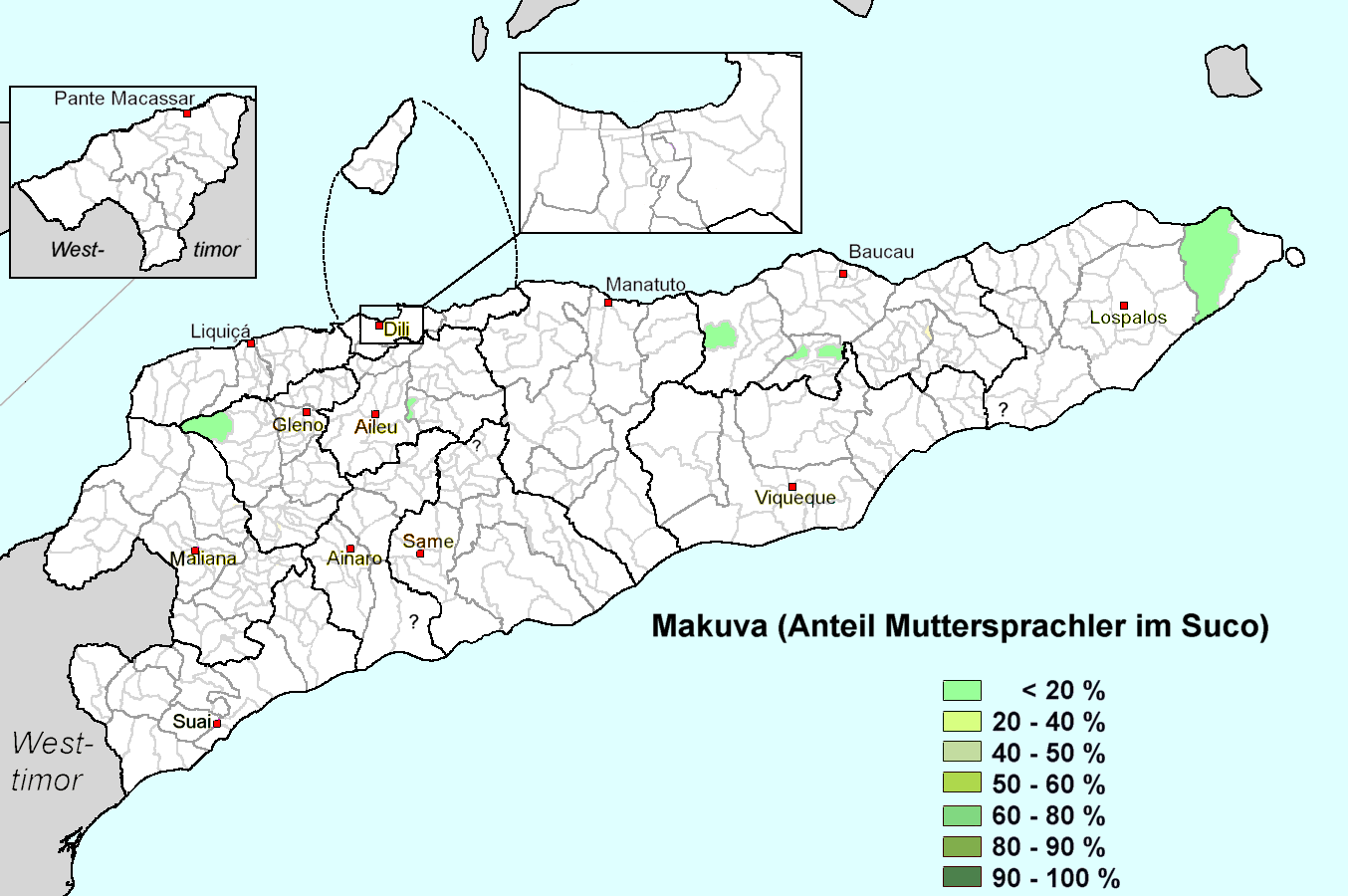
- Distribution of ethnic Makuva in Timor-Leste

- Makuva is classified as Critically Endangered by the UNESCO Atlas of the World's Languages in Danger

Makuva, also known as Makuʼa or Lóvaia, is an apparently extinct Austronesian language spoken at the northeast tip of Timor-Leste near the town of Tutuala.

Makuva has been heavily influenced by neighboring East Timorese Papuan languages, to the extent that it was long thought to be a Papuan language. The ethnic population was 50 in 1981, but the younger generation uses Fataluku as their first or second language. A 2003 report estimated that there were only five fluent speakers of the language.

== Numbers ==
Numbers in Makuva
Number	Makuva
1	itetlá
2	urua
3	okelo
4	oʼaka
5	olima
6	oneme
7	oíko
8	oava
9	osia
10	ideli
