= Pura =

Pura may refer to:

== Places ==
- Pura, Kushtagi, a village in Koppal district, Karnataka, India
- Pura, Iran, a village in Mazandaran Province, Iran
- Pura, Tarlac, a municipality in the Philippines
- Pura, Switzerland, a municipality in Ticino, Switzerland
- Pura, Chikmagalur, a settlement in Chikmagalur district, Karnataka, India
- Pura, Pakistan, ancient capital of Gedrosia present Balochistan
- Pura Island, island in Lesser Sunda Islands, INdonesia

== Fish ==
- a type of fish tail.

== People ==
- Pura (given name) (including a list of people)
- Stela Pura (born 1971), Romanian retired swimmer

== Other uses ==
- PURA, a human protein
- Pura (album), an album by Mortal
- Pura (placename element), a placename suffix used in South Asia
- Pura (Balinese temple)
- Pura (Crash Bandicoot), a character from Crash Bandicoot
- Providing Urban Amenities to Rural Areas (PURA), a rural development strategy in India
- Huawei Pura series, a line of smartphones by Huawei formerly known as the Ascend P and P series.

== See also ==
- Pura māku, a Japanese recycling symbol
- Puro (disambiguation)
