= Perro =

Perro is the Spanish word for dog. It may also refer to:

- El perro, a 2004 film
- Perro (comics), a super villain in the Marvel Comics Universe
- Perro Aguayo (born 1946), Mexican wrestler
- Perro Aguayo Jr. (born 1979), Mexican wrestler
- Planet Earth Rock and Roll Orchestra (album), an album by Paul Kantner
- Planet Earth Rock and Roll Orchestra, a nickname for various artists recording in the early 1970s
- Perro (spider), a genus of spiders

== See also ==
- The Dog (Goya), a painting also known in Spanish as El Perro
- Dave Parro (born 1957), Canadian ice hockey goaltender
- Pero (disambiguation)
- Perri (disambiguation)
- Pirro (disambiguation)
