= Paro =

Paro may refer to:

- Matteo Paro (born 1983), Italian footballer
- Paro (robot), a therapeutic robot baby harp seal
- Paro, Bhutan
- Paro International Airport, Bhutan
- Paro District, Bhutan
- Paro, Nduga, a district in Nduga Regency, Papua Highland, Indonesia
  - Paro, Indonesia, a village in Paro District
- Paro, a 32-foot-tall (9.8 m) Moai on Rapa Nui (Easter Island)
- Paro, a fictional character in Devdas (novella)
- Parvati Melton, also Paro, Indian-American actress
- Páró, the Hungarian name for Părău Commune, Braşov County, Romania
- Paro (spider), a genus of Linyphiidae spiders
- Paro, Nej' song

== See also ==
- Para (disambiguation)
- Pare (disambiguation)
- Pari (disambiguation)
- Paro Chhu, a river of western Bhutan
- Dave Parro
- Pero (disambiguation)
- Piro (disambiguation)
- Puroresu
