= Abui people =

Ethnic group from East Nusa Tenggara, Indonesia

Barawahing, Barue, Namatalaki
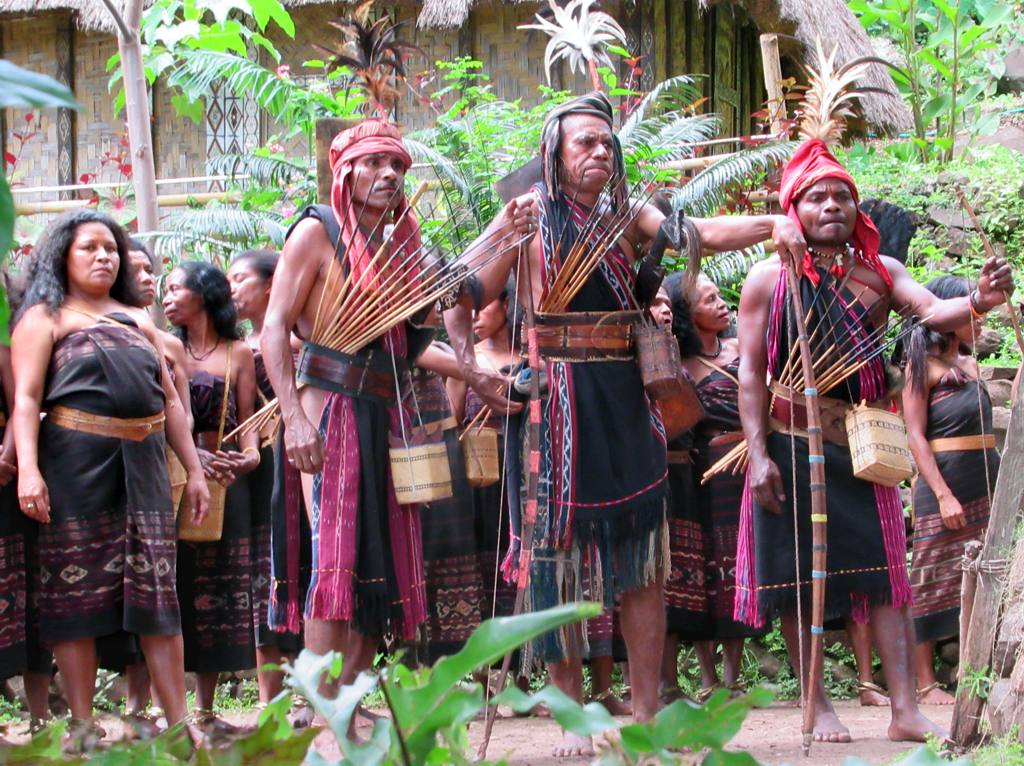
- A group of Abui people of Takpala village in traditional attire.

Total population
- Approximately 16,000 (2000)

Regions with significant populations
- Indonesia (Alor Island)

Languages
- Abui language, Alor Malay, Indonesian

Religion
- Christianity (Catholicism and Protestantism; predominantly), Animism (traditionally), Islam

Related ethnic groups
- Alorese and Papuan peoples

The Abui people, also known as Barawahing, Barue, or Namatalaki, are an indigenous ethnic group residing on Alor Island, East Nusa Tenggara, Indonesia. Abui people are spread across the districts of South Alor, East Alor, and Northwest Alor in Alor Regency. Abui people speak the Abui language, which is a Papuan (non-Austronesian) language, as well as Indonesian, and a Malay-based creole known as Alor Malay.

== Etymology ==
The term Abui is an Abui word that means ‘mountains’ or alternatively ‘enclosed place’.

Abui people refer to themselves as Abui loku, literally meaning 'the mountain people'. The bare term Abui is often associated with the large mountain range in central Alor, Abui foka, and is often contrasted to the smaller mountain range in the Kabola/Adang speaking area Abui kiding in the Bird's Head of Alor. The language is referred to as Abui tanga in the Takalelang variety (the most well-studied variety) and Abui laral in the Welai, Mola, and Mainang varieties. The glossonym Abui was first introduced by Cora Du Bois in the late 1930s after the ethnonym was already in circulation.

This ethnonym is also used in Alor Malay/Indonesian to refer to Abui speakers.

The term Barawahing is a derogatory exonym meaning 'black, smelly, smoky.'

== History ==
=== Origins ===
According to Abui oral tradition, Abui people settled in Alor in ancient times and did not find other settlers there. Later some of them moved to the Kabola peninsula. The same tradition accounts that they dwelled in caves in the mountains in the Mainang area. In this area also some rock art is found. Abui refer to neighbouring tribes as ‘younger siblings’ or as ‘new arrivals’. However, the oral tradition in Alor serves too often as a political instrument. The oral tradition has not been verified by archaeological research yet.

=== Ethnography ===
The American anthropologist Cora Du Bois studied and lived among Abui people from 1937 to 1939 in the village of Atimelang, resulting in the publication, The People of Alor. Around the same time, the Dutch sociologist Martha Margaretha Nicolspeyer published a study of the Abui social structure.

== Culture ==
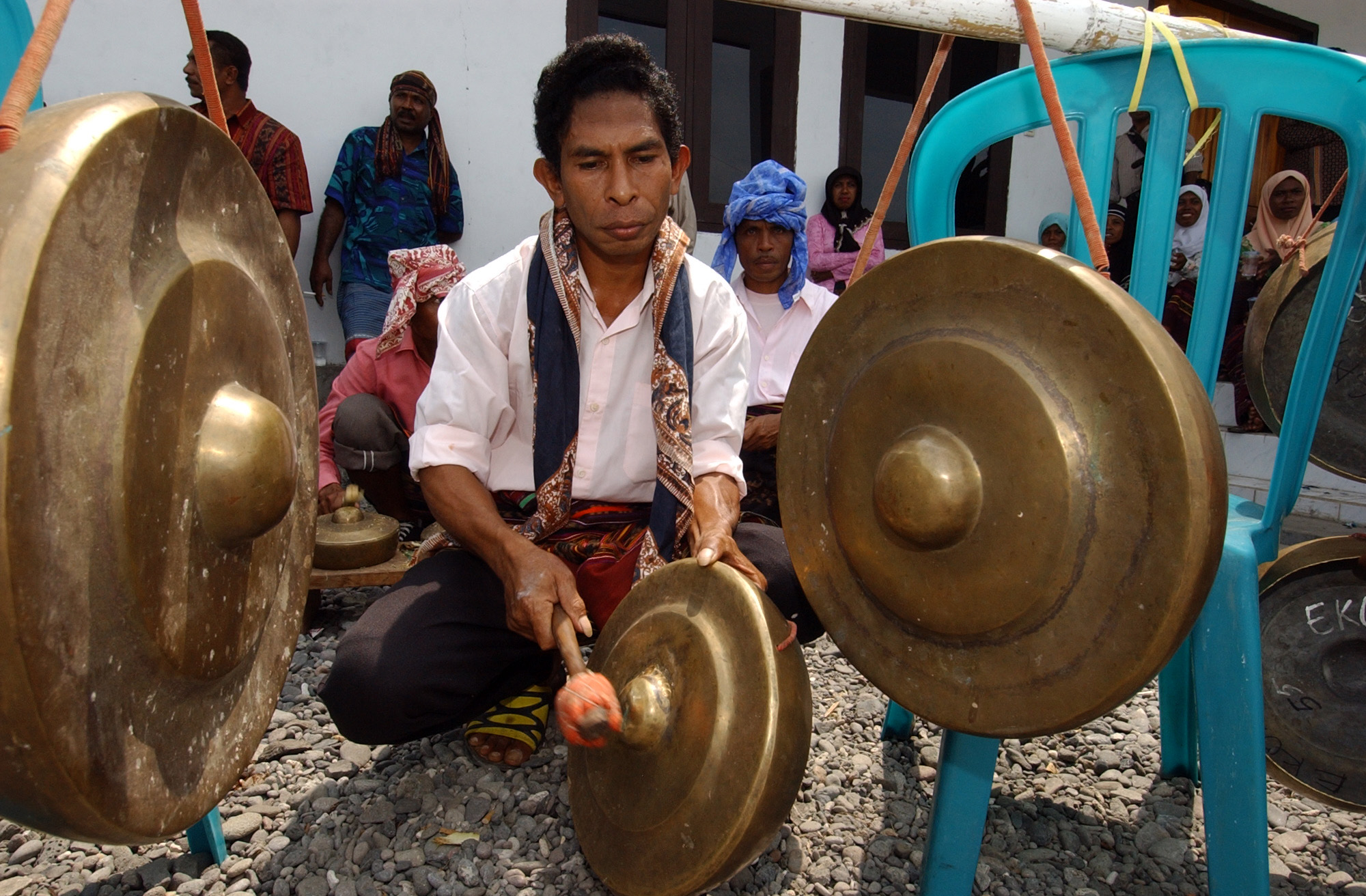
A man playing the gong for a ceremonial song and dance as an appreciation to the United States Navy for providing humanitarian assistance and medical aid to the locals affected by the November 2004 earthquake that struck Alor Island.

Abui people from Takpala village engage in a traditional dance known as lego-lego, in which dancers move in a circular pattern. Gongs and mokos are also beaten. Other Abui dance is the Cakalele used for welcoming guests.

=== Religion ===
The original religion of the inhabitants of Alor Islands was animistic until much later when Protestant missionaries arrived. Majority of the Alor Island communities are Christians, except for those living along the coast line tend to be Muslims as most of the Muslims living there migrated from other islands.

The Abui people generally are predominantly Protestant. However, their beliefs have animistic influences as well. Catholic communities are found in Kalabahi and particularly among the Abui people in Takalelang and Mainang.

There is also one Muslim Abui community, found in the coastal village of Nurdin.

== Economy ==
=== Agriculture ===
Abui speakers are mainly farmers, just like other inhabitants of Alor. However, in mountainous areas hunting and gathering is also an important supplement to the staple diet of corn, cassava, and rice. In the coastal areas, which are less favourable for agriculture, many farmers have switched to fishing, the traditional activity of the Austronesian population. Traditional livestock are pigs and chicken. However, livestock seldom supplement the diet due to frequent swine fever and poultry diseases. Thus, the diet is not well balanced, often resulting in poor health conditions and anaemia, especially among children and women. In the mountainous areas the situation is better as traditional hunting provides a more balanced diet. The mountains also favour a number of important cash crops such as tamarind, coconuts, coffee, cloves, cocoa, cashew nuts, candlenuts (Aleurites moluccana), vanilla, almonds (Canarium) and tobacco. These provide the farmers with additional income, which results in generally better living standards than for people in the coastal areas.

=== Tourism ===
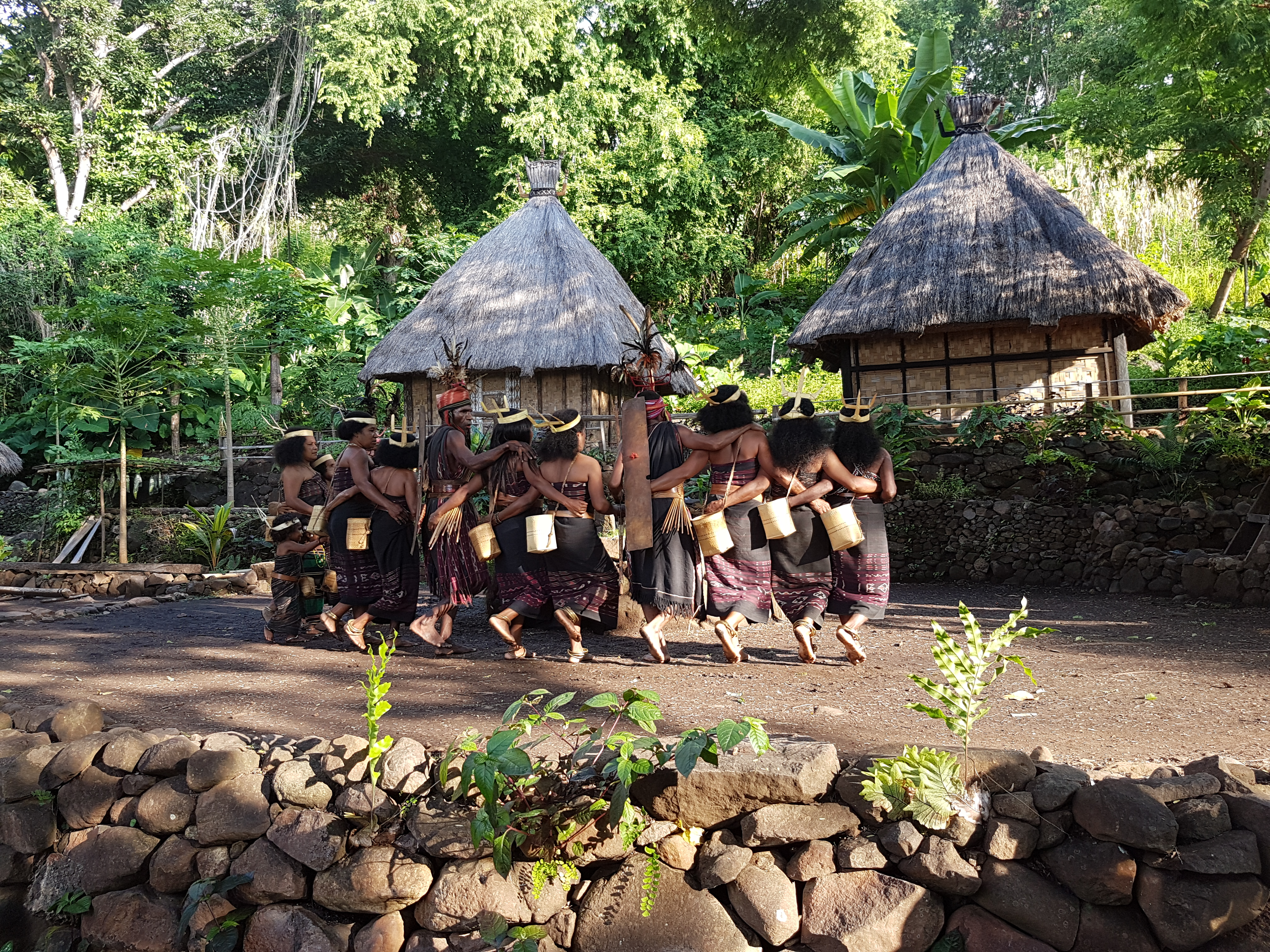
The Takpala community performs a lego-lego dance for tourists.

The Abui "traditional village of Takpala" (kampung tradisional Takpala) is a tourist destination consisting of a small cluster of traditional houses on a hillside. Visitors watch performances, pose for photographs in traditional attire, and buy handicrafts. In 1980, the Takpala Village won second place for most traditional village at the national level. There are also many Western researchers who would visit the village in order to study the culture, lifestyle and language of the Abui people. Ever since then, Takpala Village is considered a cultural heritage area by the Alor Regency and a tourist destination.

Aside from cultural tourism, Alor Island is also known as a world class diving location. To date, there are 42 registered diving sites in Alor Island.

== Education ==
Educational facilities in the Abui area are limited to elementary and secondary schools in district capitals. The nearest university is in Kalabahi, which offers limited training in economy, law, English and computer science. The more significant educational institutions are found in Kupang, the provincial capital of East Nusa Tenggara.
