= Pero =

Pero may refer to:

- Pero (mythology), several figures in Greek mythology and one in Roman mythology
- Pero (name), a list of people with either the given name or surname
- Pero language, a language of Nigeria
- Pero, Lombardy, an Italian commune
  - Pero (Milan Metro), a train station in Pero, Lombardy
- Pero (beverage), a hot grain beverage
- Pero (moth), a moth genus
- Pero (The Wonderful World of Puss 'n Boots), the protagonist of a 1969 Japanese animated musical
- Pero, fictional character and the pet dog of Shizuka Minamoto from the Japanese manga and anime series Doraemon
- Pero, fictional mascot and the pet dog of FuwaMoco

== See also ==
- Paro (disambiguation)
- Pera (disambiguation)
- Pere (disambiguation)
- Peri (disambiguation)
- Perro (disambiguation)
- Piro (disambiguation)
- Puro (disambiguation)
- Stoke Pero, Somerset, England
