= WATM =

WATM may refer to:

- WATM, the ICAO code for Alor Island Airport, Indonesia
- WATM-TV, a television station in Pennsylvania, USA
- WATM, a defunct radio station on 1590 AM in Atmore, Alabama.
