= Tereweng =

Tereweng may refer to:

- Tereweng Island, an island in the Alor Archipelago in Indonesia
- Treweng or Tereweng, a village in Alor Regency, Indonesia
- Tereweng language, a Papuan language spoken in Indonesia
