= Abui =

Abui may refer to:

- Abui language, a non-Austronesian language spoken by the Abui people of Indonesia
- Abui people, a group of indigenous people in Indonesia
