= Puntaru =

- Location of the Alor Archipelago in East Nusa Tenggara Province

- Location in Indonesia
- Coordinates: 8°27′1.85″S 124°3′16.28″E
- Country: Indonesia
- Region: Lesser Sunda Islands
- Province: East Nusa Tenggara
- Regency: Alor

Population
  - Total: 600

Puntaru is a village on Pantar Island in the Alor Regency in East Nusa Tenggara province of Indonesia. Puntaru has a population of approximately 600 and is the administrative seat of Desa Tude. The traditional language of Puntaru is Western Pantar (Tubbe dialect), though all adult residents also speak Indonesian.

An elementary school and a regional junior high school are located in Puntaru.

The economy centers around subsistence farming of dry-land rice and other cereal crops.
