= Mali Airport =

Mali Airport may refer to:

- Mali Airport (Indonesia), on Alor Island, East Nusa Tenggara, Indonesia
- Modibo Keita International Airport, the primary airport in the country of Mali
