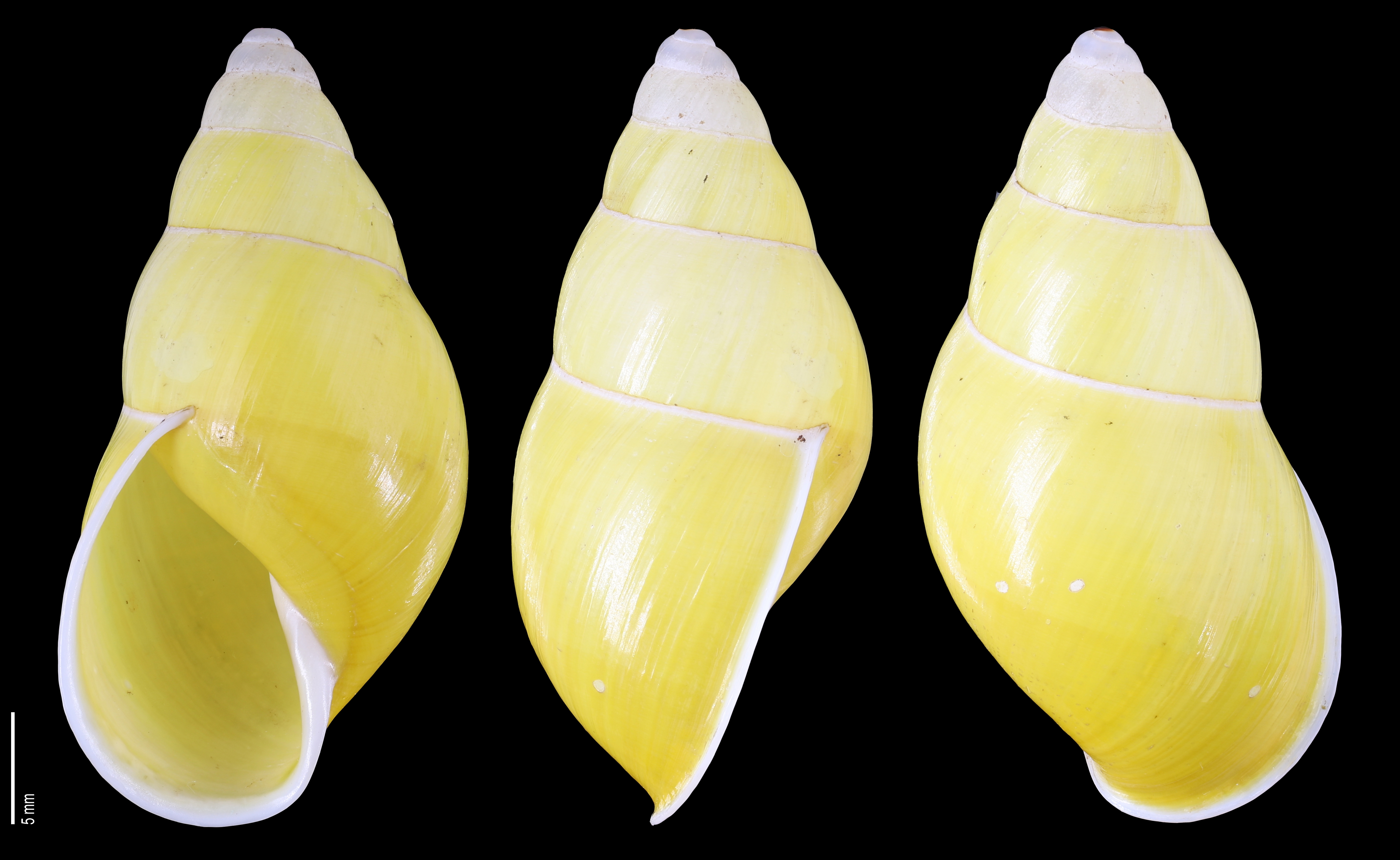
- Shell of Amphidromus rosalindae (holotype at the MNHN, Paris)

Scientific classification
- Kingdom: Animalia
- Phylum: Mollusca
- Class: Gastropoda
- Order: Stylommatophora
- Family: Camaenidae
- Genus: Amphidromus
- Species: A. rosalindae

Binomial name
- Amphidromus rosalindae Thach & Abbas, 2023

= Amphidromus rosalindae =

Species of tree snail

Amphidromus rosalindae is a species of air-breathing tree snail, an arboreal gastropod mollusk in the family Camaenidae.

== Description ==
The length of the shell attains 35.6 mm.

== Distribution ==
This species is endemic to Lesser Sunda Islands, the Philippines; also east of Alor Island, Indonesia.
