= Western Pantar language =

Papuan language spoken in parts of Indonesia

Western Pantar
- Native to: Indonesia
- Region: Nusa Tenggara Timur
- Native speakers: 10,300 (2014)
- Language family: Trans–New Guinea ?: West Bomberai ?; Timor–Alor–Pantar; Alor–Pantar; Western Pantar
- Dialects: Lamma; Mauta; Tubbe

Language codes
- ISO 639-3: lev
- Glottolog: lamm1241
- ELP: Western Pantar

Western Pantar speaker and linguist Mahalalel Lamma Koly

Western Pantar, sometimes referred to by the name of one of its dialects, Lamma, is a Papuan language spoken in the western part of Pantar island in the Alor archipelago of Indonesia. Western Pantar is spoken widely in the region by about 10,000 speakers. Although speakers often use Malay in political, religious, and educational contexts, Western Pantar remains the first language of children of the region, and is acquired to some extent by immigrants.

== Dialects ==
There are three primary dialects.

- Tubbe (spoken in Puntaru and Air Panas)
- Mauta (spoken in Kakamauta, Alimakke, Lauki, Kapas, Kolihabbang, and Alikallang)
- Lamma (spoken in Kalondama and Latuna)

Dialect differences are primarily lexical:

Tubbe	Mauta	Lamma	Gloss
bis	bis	salepi	‘mat’
haweri	haweri	bana	‘many’
kalla	kalla	kisang	‘small’
karani	karani	sinnal	‘Canarium sp.’
sai	hoba	hobi	‘quiver’

== Phonology ==
=== Consonants ===
The Western Pantar consonant inventory includes: voiced and voiceless stops /p t k ’/ and /b d g/; voiceless fricatives /s h/; nasals /n m ng/; trill /r/ and lateral /l/; and glides/w/ and /j/.

		Bilabial	Alveolar	Palatal	Velar	Glottal
Plosive	voiceless	p	t		k	ʔ ⟨'⟩
Plosive	voiced	b	d		g	
Fricative			s			h
Nasal		m	n		ŋ ⟨ng⟩	
Approximant			l	j ⟨y⟩	w	
Trill			r			

The glottal fricative /h/ is very lightly articulated. It occurs in both word-initial and word-medial positions. Words which begin with a glottal fricative can be difficult to distinguish from vowel-initial forms, which actually begin with a glottal stop.

ai ‘clothing louse’	hai ‘boat’
ar ‘root’	har ‘for you’
abbang ‘shake’	habbang ‘village’

Consonants /p t k b d ɡ s m n l/ contrast in length with longer (geminate) counterparts (written double).

duba ‘slippery’	dubba ‘push’
dake ‘now’	dakke ‘dry pandanus’
dala ‘ripe’	dalla ‘tomorrow’
asi ‘roof thatch’	assi ‘bite you’
wenang ‘old man’	wannang ‘near’

=== Vowels ===
The Western Pantar vowel system is a five-vowel system /i e a o u/. /e/ may be heard varying from [e] to [ɛ], and /a/ may be heard as either [ä], [ɐ] or [ə].

== Numbers ==
- anuku 'one'
- alaku 'two'
- atiga 'three'
- atu 'four'
- yasing 'five'
- hisnakkung 'six'
- betalaku 'seven'
- betiga 'eight'
- anuktannang 'nine'
- keanuku 'ten'
- keanuku wali ye 'eleven'
- keanuku wali alaku 'twelve'
- kealaku 'twenty'

== Classification ==
Western Pantar and the other non-Austronesian languages of Alor and Pantar comprise the Alor–Pantar language family. This family is often itself included within the Timor–Alor–Pantar family, a larger grouping which includes some (though perhaps not all) of the non-Austronesian languages of Timor Island.

The TAP group is clearly Papuan (i.e., non-Austronesian), but just how it is related to the 20 or so families which fall under the rubric Papuan is unclear. Located some 1000 km from their nearest Papuan neighbor on the New Guinea mainland, the TAP family is the most distant Papuan outlier. In contrast, the other well-known outlier, the North Halmaheran subgroup of the West Papuan family, lies a mere 300 km from its nearest Papuan neighbor, and its genetic affiliation is well established.

Based on an examination of possessive prefixes, Capell (1944) originally postulated that the TAP languages were related to the West Papuan languages of North Maluku and the Bird's Head of New Guinea. This hypothesis was later countered by Wurm et al. (1975), who classified the languages as members of the Trans–New Guinea family. However, the authors offered little evidence for this classification and remained somewhat doubtful, noting, "whichever way they [the Timor–Alor–Pantar languages] are classified, they contain strong substratum elements of the other [families] involved" (Wurm et al. 1975:318). Indeed, substratum may play an important role in understanding the history of TAP languages. Ross (2005) assigns TAP to his West Trans–New Guinea linkage, a subgroup of Trans–New Guinea. The evidence for this relies entirely on pronominal shapes, and yet there is significant variation in pronoun shapes in this linkage. TAP languages share some innovations/retentions with some members of the linkage, and other innovations/retentions with yet other different members of the linkage. For example, TAP languages retain *na as a reflex of pTNG first person singular *na, whereas several other members of the linkage show metathesis here. This kind of variation is to be expected, since by a "linkage" Ross means a dialect chain which has diversified in situ via overlapping innovations. More problematic is the correspondence of second and third person pronouns, an issue which is not addressed by Ross. TAP languages show a reversal of pTNG second and third pronouns, as can be seen comparing Ross's pTNG reconstructions with Nedebang pronouns.

Trans–New Guinea and Pantar pronouns
	pTNG	W Pantar
1SG	*na	nang
2SG	*ŋga	haŋ
3SG	*(ya)	gaŋ

Western Pantar pronouns can only be derived from pTNG by a flip-flop in which second person pronouns trade places with third person, a typologically unusual situation. Recent work by Donohue & Schapper (2007) suggests that both Capell and Wurm may be right and that TAP may involve an overlay of both Trans–New Guinea and West Papuan elements. Clearly, much more work is needed in order to unravel the complex linguistic pre-history of the TAP languages. One of the main stumbling blocks to further progress is the lack of adequate primary data from the individual languages in the Trans-New Guinea group, especially the languages of the Bomberai Peninsula.
