= Providing Urban Amenities to Rural Areas =

Strategy for rural development in India

Providing Urban Amenities to Rural Areas (PURA) is a strategy for rural development in India. This concept was given by former president Dr. A.P.J. Abdul Kalam and discussed in his book Target 3 Billion which he co-authored with Srijan Pal Singh. The genesis of PURA can be traced to the work done by Nimbkar Agricultural Research Institute in the early 1990s on Taluka energy self-sufficiency. It was shown in the study that energy self-sufficient talukas can be a new development model for rural India in terms of creation of jobs and better amenities to its population.

PURA proposes that urban infrastructure and services be provided in rural hubs to create economic opportunities outside of cities. Physical connectivity by providing roads, electronic connectivity by providing communication networks, and knowledge connectivity by establishing professional and technical institutions will have to be done in an integrated way so that economic connectivity will emanate. The Indian central government has been running pilot PURA programs in several states since 2004. The Shyama Prasad Mukherjee Rurban Mission is a successor to this mission.

== Current status of PURA ==
=== Failure of PURA ===
Former Rural Development Minister Jairam Ramesh on 24 February 2012 launched the restructured PURA scheme that combines rural infrastructure development with economic regeneration in Private Public Partnership (PPP) mode and seeks to harness the efficiencies of the private sector. He slammed former president APJ Abdul Kalam's concept of PURA as a failure. Ramesh said that while the PURA launched by Kalam has failed, the reworked PURA will succeed. The minister was optimistic about the success of the new PURA because of the difference in the objectives. He was of the view that, now the focus was on water supply, sanitation, and physical infrastructure rather than knowledge connectivity.

=== Extension to 2000 new towns ===
The Rural ministry plans to reform one of its ambitious yet not so successful programme; Provision of Urban amenities in Rural Areas (PURA), to facilitate creation of urban infrastructure in around 2,000 new towns that have been identified by the 2011 decadal census. It is also trying to restructure the old PURA objectives laid down by the then President.

=== Underpayment of wages ===
The Prestigious scheme proposed providing livelihood and urban amenities in compact areas around a potential growth center in Gram Panchayats through Public Private Partnership (PPP) framework to provide guarantee employment to rural areas so that they could have an assured income for at least 100 days of a year. The scheme is now facing rampant corruption, cases of underpayment of wages have been received by the government from all over the country.

== See also ==
- Swaraj
- Central place theory
- Unified settlement planning
- Regional planning
- Spatial planning
