= Threshold population =

In microeconomics, a threshold population is the minimum number of people needed for a service to be worthwhile.

In economic geography, a threshold population is the minimum number of people necessary before a particular good or service can be provided in an area. The concept is equivalent to the "range" in central place theory and retailing, which delineates the market area of a central place for a particular good or service, and is dependent on the spatial distribution of population and the willingness of consumers to travel a given distance to purchase particular goods or services.

Typically a low-order shop (such as a grocer or newsagent) may require only 800 or so customers, whereas a higher-order store such as Marks and Spencer or Waitrose may need a threshold of 70,000 to be profitable, and a university may need 350,000 to be viable.

Thresholds may also be linked to the spending power of customers; this is most obvious in periodic markets in poor countries, where wages are so low that people can buy the goods or services only once in a while.
