= Pura Island =

Island in the Alor Archipleago in Indonesia

Pura
Native name: Pulau Pura
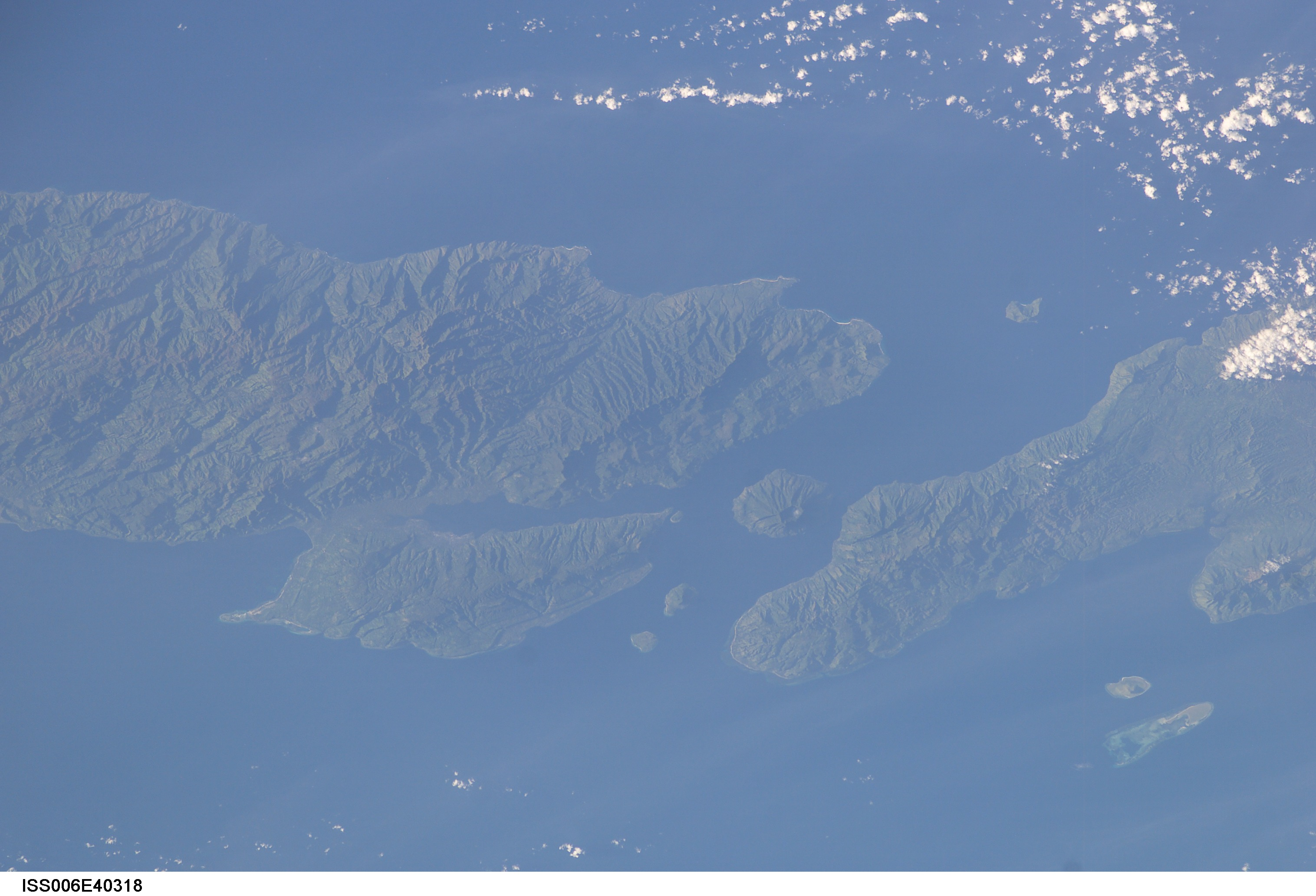
- Satellite photo of Pura located between Alor (left) and Pantar (right)

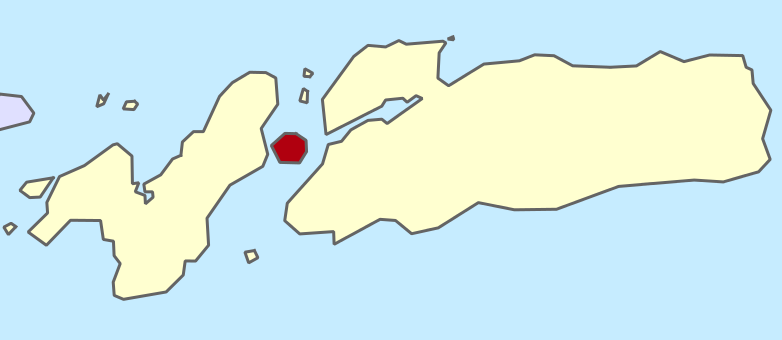
- Location of Pura in Alor Regency

Geography
- Coordinates: 8°18′15″S 124°20′31″E
- Archipelago: Alor archipelago
- Area: 27.83 km^{2} (10.75 sq mi)
- Highest elevation: 1,015 m (3330 ft)
- Highest point: Pura

Administration
- Indonesia
- Province: East Nusa Tenggara
- Regency: Alor
- District: Pura Island

Demographics
- Population: 5,690 (mid 2023 estimate)
- Pop. density: 197/km^{2} (510/sq mi)

Pura is an island in the Alor archipelago, located on the eastern tip of the Lesser Sunda Islands. The island is the largest island in the Alor Strait, which separates the two larger islands of Pantar and Alor. It has an area of 27.83 km^{2}, with a hilly terrain along the northern coast of the island.

Administratively, the island consists of the entirety of the Pura Island District (Kecamatan Pulau Pura), which in turn is further subdivided into 6 villages. Economically, the island remains dependent on agriculture and fishery which takes up 87% of the local workforce. Coconuts and cashew nuts take up the largest amount of cropland, while corn and cassava are the primary food crops, with some rice being cultivated as well. Of the 19 km of roads in the island, 18 are categorized as "heavily damaged" dirt roads.

The island can be reached by motorboats from Alor, with the trip taking about 50 minutes. The highest point of the island, at 1,015 m, is the rim of a volcano cone.
