= Unified settlement planning =

Unified settlement planning (USP) is the component of regional planning where a unified approach is applied for a region's overall development. The USP approach is most often associated with urban planning practices in India.

== Overview ==
Regions use their land in for various purposes, including agriculture, manufacturing, and public administration. For society to develop, it has to amalgamate and develop settlements; their coexistence is the basis for a holistic development of any society.

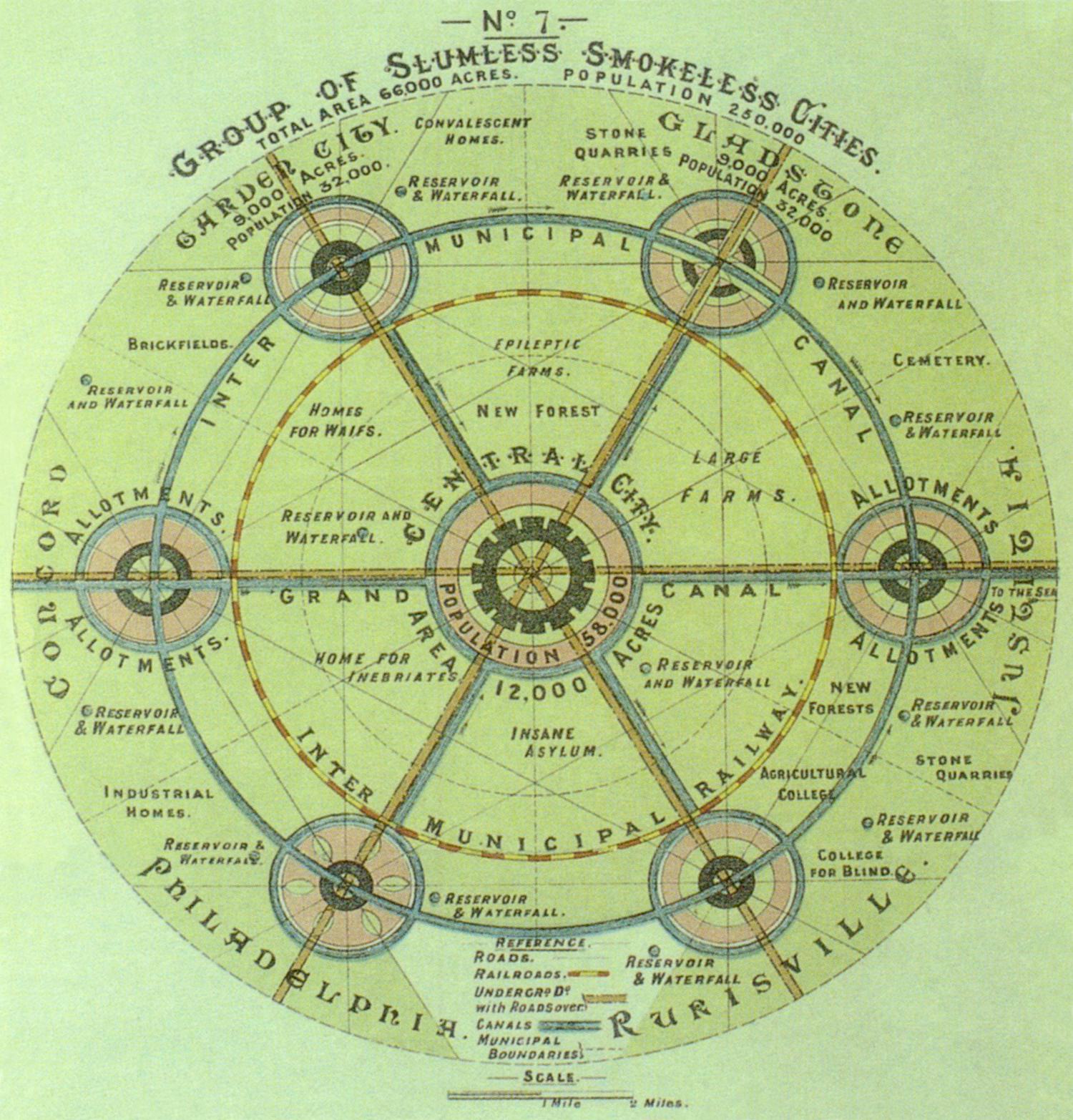
The original "Garden City" concept by Ebenezer Howard, 1902.

Unified settlement planning is a contemporary approach for the bulk requirement of urban amenities, for the vast regions of the developing countries with uniformly distributed human settlement patterns. The approach is gaining importance in India, primarily due to the difficulties posed by the high density of existing rural settlements, in implementing the conventional plans with contiguous urban zones, around pre‑existing cities. The approach utilizes the advantages of the uniformly distributed human settlement patterns and avoids the difficulties caused by the dense network of roads and villages, all over the regions. Unified settlement planning allows holistic regional development without significantly disturbing existing villages, farmland, bodies of water, and forests.

== History ==
The Walter Christaller concept

Sir Ebenezer Howard (29 January 1850– May 1, 1928) is known for his publication Garden Cities of To-morrow (1898), the description of a utopian city in which people live harmoniously together with nature, which forms the basis for unified settlement planning. The publication resulted in the founding of the garden city movement, that realized several Garden Cities in Great Britain at the beginning of the 20th century.

Walter Christaller (April 21, 1893 – March 9, 1969) who was a German geographer, developed the idea of Central Place Theory. It stated that settlements simply functioned as 'central places' providing services to surrounding areas.

August Lösch (October 15, 1906 in Öhringen-) a German economist, is regarded as the founder of Regional Science. August Lösch expanded on Christaller’s work in his book 'The Spatial Organization of the Economy'(1940). Unlike Christaller, whose system of central places began with the highest-order, Lösch began with a system of lowest-order (self-sufficient) farms, which were regularly distributed in a triangular-hexagonal pattern. He thought that Christaller's model led to patterns where the distribution of goods and the accumulation of profits were based entirely on location. He instead focused on maximizing consumer welfare and creating an ideal consumer landscape where the need to travel for any good was minimized and profits were held level, not maximized to accrue extra.

Mohandas Karamchand Gandhi visioned for a free country governed by their own people;he penned down his visions in a book Hind Swaraj or Indian Home Rule in 1909.Swaraj stated that every village should be its own republic, "independent of its neighbours for its own vital wants and yet interdependent for many others in which dependence is necessary". A decentralized, unexploited, co-operative, self-reliant and peace-loving development of a region is must for development of India.

These ideas of swaraj was developed in light of contemporary scenario in India as Providing Urban Amenities to Rural Areas, envisioned by former president of India and an eminent scientist Dr A. P. J. Abdul Kalam and framed by Prof. Emerson.

Providing Urban Amenities to Rural Areas proposes that urban infrastructure and services be provided in rural hubs to create economic opportunities outside of cities. These ideas will be possible through physical connectivity by providing roads, electronic connectivity by providing communication network and knowledge connectivity by establishing professional and technical institutions. The programs will have to be done in an integrated way so that economic connectivity will emanate. The Indian central government has been running pilot programs in several states since 2004.

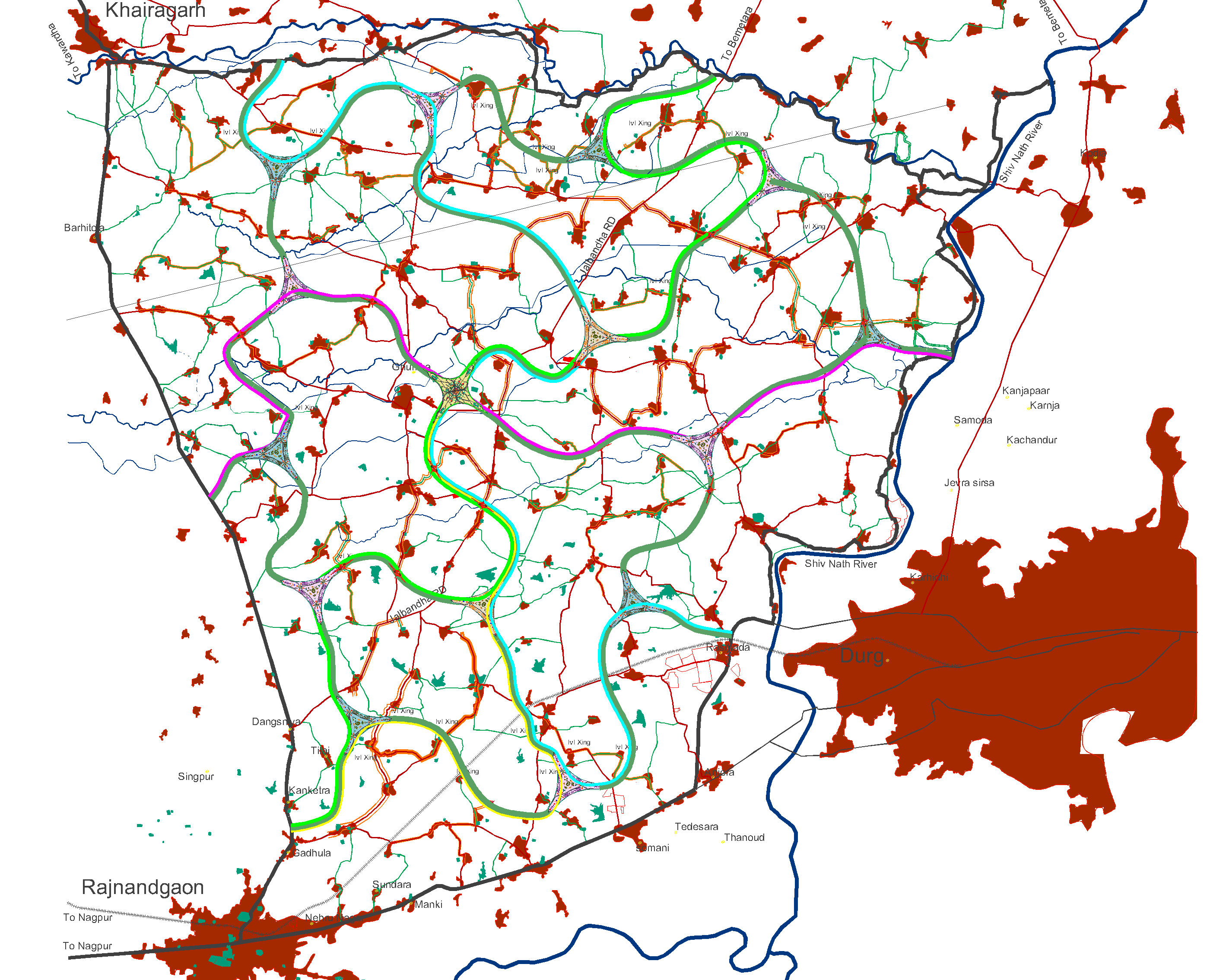
The Regional Module of Rajnandgaon, Chhattisgarh, India

== Recent developments ==
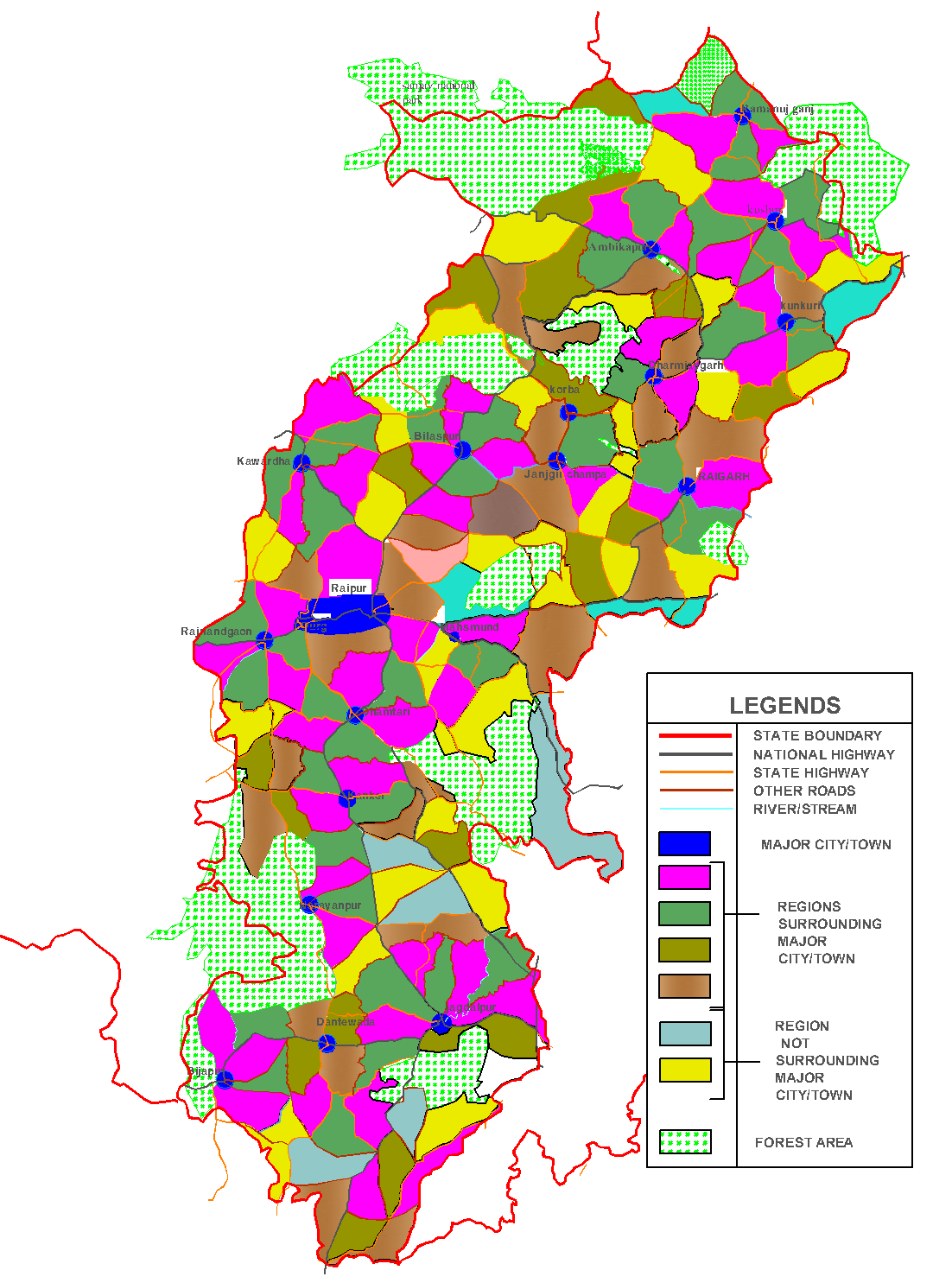
The regional modules in Chhattisgarh(India)

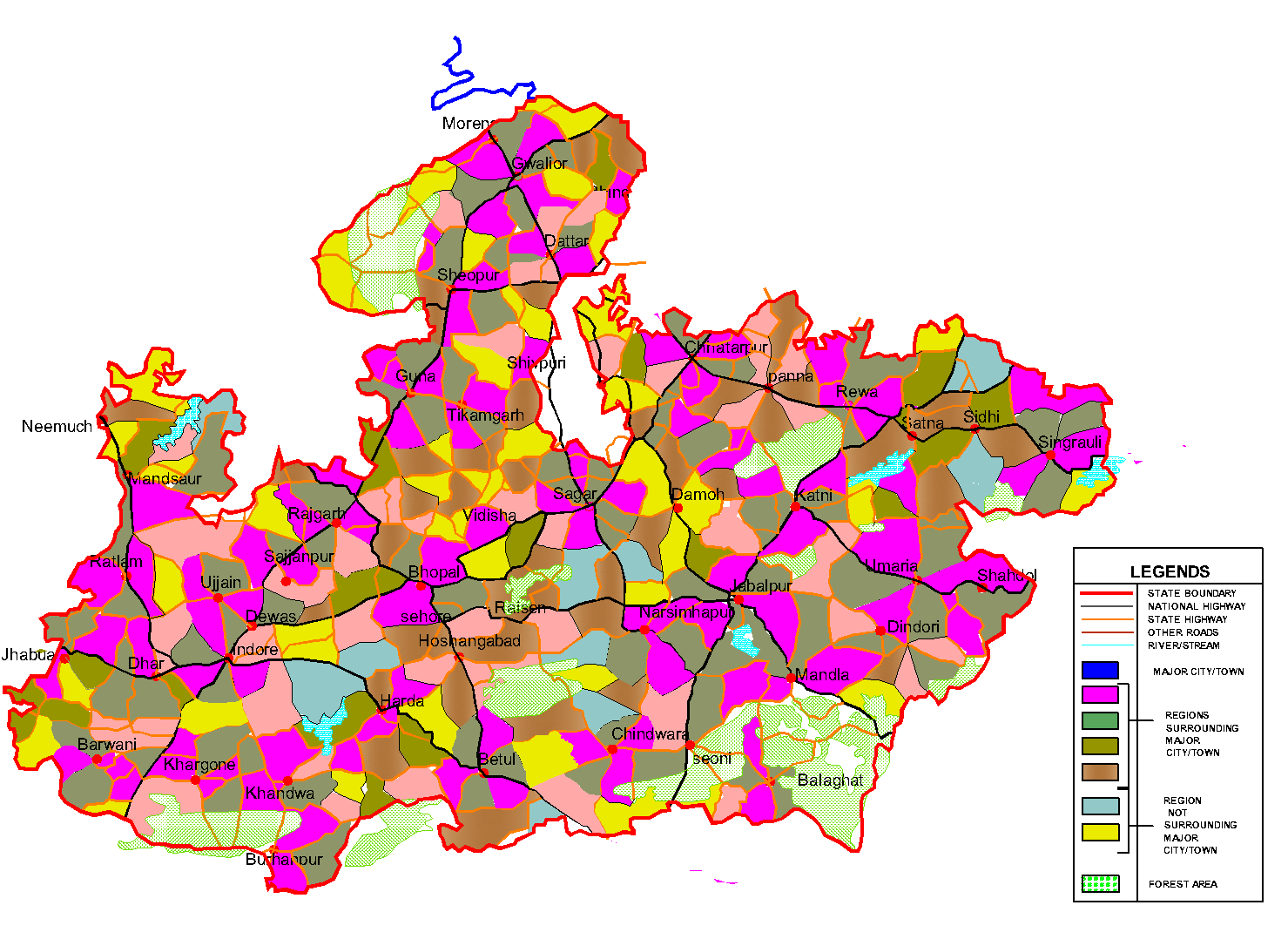
The regional modules in Madhya Pradesh(India)

Chhattisgarh, one of the fastest growing states of India, has initiated deliberations on the subject, for its development strategies. The process has started with some useful studies and research on the area by Dr. Devendra K. Sharma.

Based on a comprehensive scheme on the Unified settlement Plan for India, targeted to serve the whole nation in future, the Chhattisgarh government is contemplating a project for the holistic development of a regional module of about 700 km^{2}. area, enclosed between the highways connecting Durg, Ragnandgaon & Khairagarh.

Institute of Town Planners, India (ITPI) organised a national seminar on the subject of Urban Dynamics and Planning - 2032, on 18 & 19 April 2012. The seminar has strongly recommended that the development of rural and urban settlements in India should not be planned separately.

== Principles ==
The fundamental objective for a unified settlement plan includes:

- Low cost of living with basic requirements.
- Ample work opportunities, near the residences .
- Viability of institutions along with ample options for the clientele.
- Efficiency of the infrastructure, without any prejudice to the density of the settlements.
- Fool-proof security, especially for the areas with large population concentration.
- Each region to be self-reliant and interdependent wherever necessary.

The strategies for achieving the objectives include:

- Definition of the regional modules.
- Minimizing the expenditure on land for urban amenities.
- Avoiding expenditure on the new residences for the population with existing houses.
- Development of efficient and economical transportation systems from origin to destination.
- Comparable generation and utilisation of energy in the module.
- Self-sufficiency in water utilization .
- Cooperative ownership of the urban land and its key facilities.

Name	Types of urban nodes	Provision for residence	Implementation strategy
Garden Cities of To-morrow (Ebenezer Howard)	Similar nodes surrounding a central hub	yes	Projects implemented without specific implementation strategy
Central Place Theory (Walter Christaller)	Special emphasis on hierarchy of nodes from higher to lower order	yes	no specific implementation strategy
Central Place Theory(review) (August Lösch)	Similar hierarchy applied but starting from lower order to higher order	yes	no specific implementation strategy
Providing Urban Amenities to Rural Areas	One nodal ring with all amenities repeated in every module	no	no specific implementation strategy
Unified settlement plan for India	Specific category micro urban nodes for Industries, Institutions and Agro infrastructure surrounding a Central Hub	no	Special emphasis on implementation strategy with initial phase public transportation network and later phase for development of micro urban nodes around the junction

== See also ==
- Central place theory
- The City (Weber book)
- Transport planning
- Rural–urban fringe
- Regional planning
- Spatial planning
- Providing Urban Amenities to Rural Areas
