= Abstract space =

Abstract space, in geography, is a hypothetical space characterized by equal and consistent properties; a geographic space that is completely homogeneous. All movement and activity would be equally easy or difficult in all directions and all locations within this space. This concept is useful for modeling or analyzing spatial activity and behavior by limiting or eliminating extraneous variables, such as terrain. For example, if researchers want to study the relationship between culture and trade, they don't want their model to be overwhelmed or influenced by factors such as mountainous barriers and rivers because these would detract from the purpose of modeling how culture alone effects trade.

== See also ==
- Central Place Theory
