= Paro simoni =

Scientific classification
- Kingdom: Animalia
- Phylum: Arthropoda
- Subphylum: Chelicerata
- Class: Arachnida
- Order: Araneae
- Infraorder: Araneomorphae
- Family: Linyphiidae
- Genus: Paro; Berland, 1942
- Species: P. simoni

Binomial name
- Paro simoni Berland, 1942

Genus of spiders

Paro simoni is a species of Spanish dwarf spiders. It is the only species in the monotypic genus Paro. The species and genus were first described by Lucien Berland in 1942, and has only been found on the Austral Islands. Originally placed with the Agelenidae, it was moved to the sheet weavers in 1967.
