= Puro =

Puro may refer to:

== People ==
- Alec Puro (born 1975), American musician and composer
- Olavi Puro (1918–1999), Finnish World War II flying ace
- Teuvo Puro (1884–1956), Finnish actor and filmmaker

== Other ==
- Puroresu, professional wrestling in Japan
- Puro, a cigar completely made of tobacco produced in multiple places

== See also ==
- Pura (disambiguation)
- Pure (disambiguation)
