= Pirro =

Pirro may refer to:

An Albanian given name; derived from Greek "Pyrrhos" (Latinized as "Pyrrhus") (flame-coloured, red-haired).

- Pirro Albergati (1663–1735), Italian composer
- Pirro Çako (born 1965), Albanian artist
- Pirro Colonna, Italian military leader
- Pirro Del Balzo (c. 1430–1491), Italian nobleman
- Pirro Dodbiba (1925–2004), Albanian politician
- Pirro Maria Gabrielli (1643–1705), Italian physician
- Pirro Gonzaga (1490–1529), Italian nobleman and condottiero
- Pirro Gonzaga (cardinal) (1505–1529), Roman Catholic cardinal
- Pirro Imperoli (1554–1617), Roman Catholic prelate
- Pirro Kondi (born 1924, date of death unknown, 2015 or before), Albanian former politician
- Pirro Ligorio (1512–1583), Italian architect and painter
- Pirro Mani (1932–2021), Albanian actor
- Pirro Marconi (1897–1938), Italian archaeologist
- Pirro Mosi (born 1927), Albanian photographer
- Pirro Vaso (born 1948), Albanian architect
- Pirro Vengu (born 1986), Albanian politician

As an Italian name, it is derived either from the aforementioned Greek name or from a variant of the name "Pierro" (from Peter).

Pirro or DiPirro originates from the name "di Pirro" or "DiPirro" meaning "of Pirro" or "family of Pirro".

Pirro comes from the historical figure of Pyrrhus of Epirus (319/318 BC – 272 BC).

The Pirro family originated in ancient Greece and "Great Greece" or Magna Graecia, the name of the coastal areas of Southern Italy on the Tarentine Gulf that were extensively colonized by Greek settlers.

- André Pirro (1869–1943), French musicologist and organist
- Emanuele Pirro (born 1962), Italian race-car driver
- Jean Pirro (1813–1886), French linguist, inventor of the a posteriori universal language "Universalglot", published in 1868
- Jeanine Pirro (born 1951), American politician, attorney, TV personality, author, and former New York State judge and prosecutor
- John Pirro (died 2013), former lacrosse player and coach
- Mark Pirro (born 1970), American musician, audio engineer, and record producer
- Michele Pirro (born 1986), Italian motorcycle racer
- Nicholas J. Pirro (born 1940), American politician
- Rocco Pirro (1916–1995), American football player and politician
- Ugo Pirro (1920–2008), Italian screenwriter and novelist
- Pirro Ligorio (died 1583), Italian artist

Pirro people, commonly called Yine people, an indigenous tribe in the Peruvian Amazon

== See also ==
- Piro (disambiguation)
- Piro Milkani (often written Pirro Milkani; 1939–2025), Albanian film director
