= Pura (given name) =

Pura is the given name of:

- Pura Belpré (1899–1982), first Puerto Rican librarian in New York City
- Pura Fé (born 1959), Native American singer, songwriter, musician, poet, artist, dancer, teacher and social activist
- Pura Lopez (born 1962), Spanish shoe designer
- Pura López Colomé (born 1952), Mexican poet, translator
- Pura Santillan-Castrence (1905–2007), Filipino writer and diplomat
