= Kalabahi =

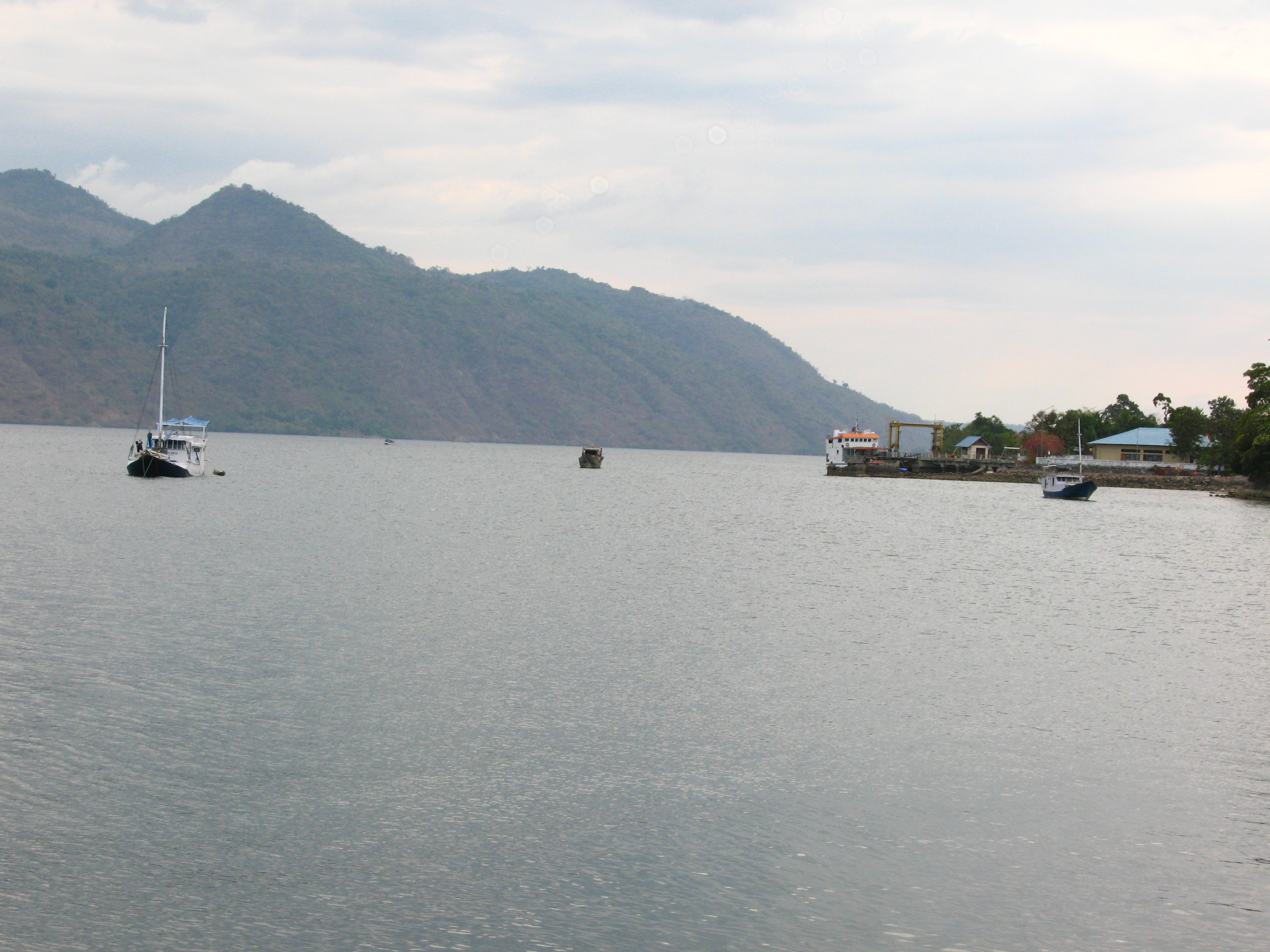
- Kalabahi harbour

- Location in Lesser Sunda Islands and Indonesia Kalabahi (Indonesia)
- Coordinates: 8°13′S 124°31′E
- Country: Indonesia
- Region: Lesser Sunda Islands
- Province: East Nusa Tenggara
- Regency: Alor Regency

Area
  - Total: 8.78 km^{2} (3.39 sq mi)

Population (mid 2023 estimate)
  - Total: 19,210
- Time zone: UTC+8 (Indonesia Central Time)
- Area code: (+62) 386

Kalabahi is a town on Alor Island and it is the capital of Alor Regency in East Nusa Tenggara province of Indonesia. It is the only town on Alor Island. It lies on the north end of the narrow Kalabahi Bay, which is 16 kms long and 1 km wide, and separates the Bird's Head peninsula from the main part of the island. The town possesses the only puskesmas (health clinic) available in Teluk Mutiara District, in west Kalabahi.

It covers four kelurahan (villages) of the Teluk Mutiara District (Kalabahi Barat, Kalabahi Kota, Kalabahi Tengah and Kalabahi Timur), with a land area of 8.78 km^{2} and a population of 19,210 according to the official estimates for mid 2023.

Kode Wilayah	Name of kelurahan or desa	Area in km^{2}	Pop'n Estimate mid 2023	Post codes
53.05.01.1001	Kalabahi Barat (West Kalabahi)	3.39	3,909	85814
53.05.01.1002	Kalabahi Kota (Kalabahi Town)	0.51	2,799	85813
53.05.01.1003	Kalabahi Tengah (Central Kalabahi)	1.49	6,393	85812
53.05.01.1004	Kalabahi Timur (East Kalabahi)	3.39	6,109	85811
53.05.01	Kalabahi Totals	8.78	19,210	
53.05.01.1005	Binongko *	0.73	3,434	85815
53.05.01.1006	Nusa Kenari *	6.48	3,376	85819
53.05.01.1008	Welai Barat (West Welai)	17.51	3,351	85816
53.05.01.1009	Welai Timur (East Welai)	14.04	3,062	85817
53.05.01.1010	Mutiara *	5.77	5,121	85819
53.05.01.1011	Wetabua *	0.65	2,366	85819
53.05.01.2012	Lendola	4.25	3,917	85819
53.05.01.2013	Fanating	12.18	2,089	85819
53.05.01.2014	Motongbang	3.03	2,807	85819
53.05.01.2015	Air Kenari	0.86	2,309	85819
53.05.01.2018	Teluk Kenari	5.04	1,061	85819
53.05.01.2019	Adang Buom	0.87	1,925	85819
53.05.01	Rest of Teluk; Mutiara District	71.41	34,818	

Note: The four kelurahan indicated by asterisks (*) are suburbs of Kalabahi town. Including them with Kalabahi town raises the population in mid 2023 to 33,507 and its area to 22.41 km^{2}.

== Transportation ==
The town is served by Alor Island Airport.

== Climate ==
Kalabahi has a tropical savanna climate (Aw) with a long dry season and a short wet season.

Climate data for Kalabahi
Month	Jan	Feb	Mar	Apr	May	Jun	Jul	Aug	Sep	Oct	Nov	Dec	Year
Mean daily maximum °C (°F)	29.5 (85.1)	29.2 (84.6)	29.9 (85.8)	30.4 (86.7)	30.5 (86.9)	30.0 (86.0)	29.4 (84.9)	29.4 (84.9)	29.7 (85.5)	30.3 (86.5)	30.9 (87.6)	30.1 (86.2)	29.9 (85.9)
Daily mean °C (°F)	26.6 (79.9)	26.2 (79.2)	26.4 (79.5)	26.7 (80.1)	26.6 (79.9)	26.1 (79.0)	25.3 (77.5)	25.0 (77.0)	25.3 (77.5)	26.2 (79.2)	27.5 (81.5)	27.1 (80.8)	26.3 (79.3)
Mean daily minimum °C (°F)	23.7 (74.7)	23.2 (73.8)	23.0 (73.4)	23.0 (73.4)	22.8 (73.0)	22.3 (72.1)	21.3 (70.3)	20.7 (69.3)	21.0 (69.8)	22.2 (72.0)	24.1 (75.4)	24.1 (75.4)	22.6 (72.7)
Average rainfall mm (inches)	234 (9.2)	209 (8.2)	189 (7.4)	100 (3.9)	64 (2.5)	42 (1.7)	19 (0.7)	3 (0.1)	6 (0.2)	23 (0.9)	94 (3.7)	190 (7.5)	1,173 (46)
Source: Climate-Data.org
