= Perro (spider) =

Scientific classification
- Kingdom: Animalia
- Phylum: Arthropoda
- Subphylum: Chelicerata
- Class: Arachnida
- Order: Araneae
- Infraorder: Araneomorphae
- Family: Linyphiidae
- Genus: Perro; Tanasevitch, 1992

Type species
- P. subtilipes (Tanasevitch, 1985)

Species
- 5, see text

Genus of spiders

Perro is a genus of dwarf spiders that was first described by A. V. Tanasevitch in 1992.

== Species ==
As of May 2019 it contains five species, found in Russia and Canada:

- Perro camtschadalica (Kulczyński, 1885) – Russia
- Perro polaris (Eskov, 1986) – Russia, Canada
- Perro putoranica (Eskov, 1986) – Russia
- Perro subtilipes (Tanasevitch, 1985) (type) – Russia
- Perro tshuktshorum (Eskov & Marusik, 1991) – Russia
