= Mali Airport (Indonesia) =

Airport in Alor, Indonesia

Mali Airport Bandar Udara Mali
- IATA: ARD; ICAO: WATM

Summary
- Airport type: Public
- Owner: Government of Indonesia
- Operator: Directorate General of Civil Aviation
- Serves: Kalabahi
- Location: Kabola, Alor Regency, East Nusa Tenggara, Indonesia
- Time zone: WITA (UTC+08:00)
- Elevation AMSL: 39 ft (12 m)
- Coordinates: 8°7′54″S 124°35′51″E

Map
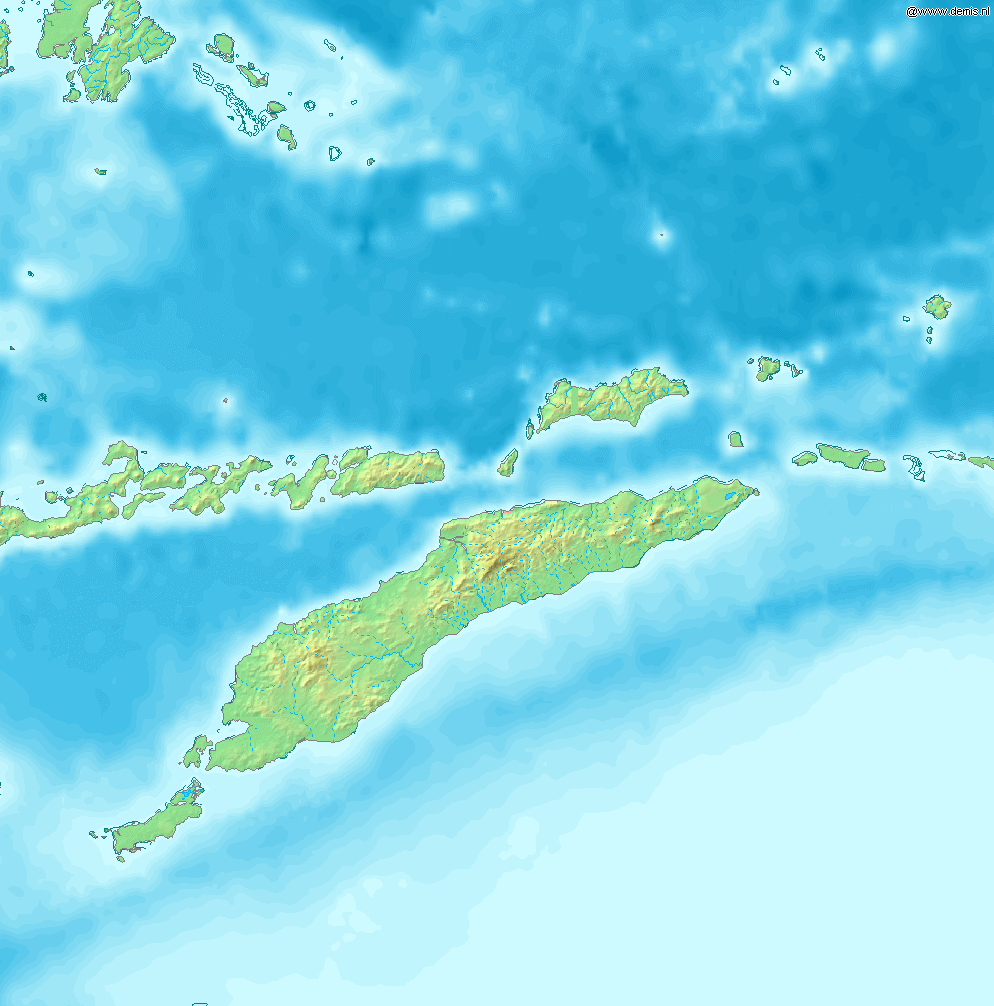
- Location in Alor archipelago Location in Indonesia

Runways
| Direction | Length | | Surface |
| Direction | m | ft | Surface |
|---|---|---|---|
| 03/21 | 1,600 | 5,249 | Asphalt |

Statistics (2024)
- Passengers: 41,007 (▲5.8%)
- Cargo (tonnes): 176.58 (▲1.9%)
- Aircraft movements: 708 (▼1.9%)
- Source: DGCA

Mali Airport (IATA: ARD, ICAO: WATM), also known as the Alor Island Airport, is a domestic regional airport serving Kalabahi, the administrative center of Alor Regency on Alor Island, East Nusa Tenggara, Indonesia. The name "Mali" is rooted in the local traditions and legends of the Alor people and is closely associated with the history of the coastal area of Alor Island, particularly the area surrounding the present-day airport. The airport is one of only two in the regency, the other being Kabir Airport on Pantar Island, with this airport being the largest and busiest in the regency. Located approximately 18 km (11.2 miles) from Kalabahi town center, it serves as the main gateway to the town, Alor Island, and the wider Alor Archipelago. As of 2026, Wings Air is the sole airline operating flights to and from the airport, which operates flights to and from Kupang, the provincial capital of East Nusa Tenggara on Timor Island. Previously, the airport was also connected by flights to Denpasar in Bali, although this service has since been discontinued.

== History ==
=== Construction and early history ===
The former terminal of Mali Airport, before 2022

Mali Airport was built by the Indonesian government between 1974 and 1975 as part of a program initiated by the Directorate General of Civil Aviation under the Ministry of Transportation to construct and develop rural airstrips across Indonesia. The program aimed to improve access to isolated and remote regions where air transportation was often the only viable means of transport. Construction of the airfield was initially carried out through a combination of local community self-help efforts (gotong royong) and government support. Mali Airport was at that time one of 23 airstrips constructed by the Indonesian government in East Nusa Tenggara at the time. Their construction made air travel increasingly accessible to residents of the province, facilitating travel between its various regencies.

When the airport began operations, it was designated as a rural airstrip capable of accommodating only small aircraft, such as Cessna aircraft and the de Havilland Canada DHC-6 Twin Otter. Merpati Nusantara Airlines was among the first airlines to serve the airport, providing a connection between Alor and Kupang, the provincial capital of East Nusa Tenggara. The airline initially used the Twin Otter, later the Fokker 27 and finally the Xian MA-60 prior to its eventual closure in early 2014.

Throughout the 1980s and 1990s, the airport underwent further upgrades, enabling it to accommodate larger aircraft such as the CASA C-212 Aviocar. Merpati continued to operate flights to Kupang, its hub in East Nusa Tenggara, providing Alor with direct connections to other destinations in the region, including Larantuka, Maumere, and Lewoleba, as well as Denpasar in Bali. Despite these upgrades, the runway at the time still consisted of a combination of grass and asphalt surfaces.

In 2004, the runway at Mali Airport was extended from 1,050 meters to 1,520 meters, and its width was increased from 23 meters to 30 meters, enabling aircraft such as the Fokker 27 and ATR 42 to land at the airport. The runway was later extended again to 1,600 m, enabling the airport to accommodate ATR 72 aircraft. Other airlines soon began serving Alor, complementing Merpati's existing service to Kupang, which operated four weekly flights. TransNusa subsequently inaugurated its own Kalabahi–Kupang service, initially operated with the Fokker 50 and later with the ATR 72. The service persisted until it was terminated due to the COVID-19 pandemic in 2020. Trigana Air also operated the Kupang–Kalabahi route between 2005 and 2006, initially in a joint venture with TransNusa, before the route was discontinued sometime prior to 2013.

=== Contemporary history ===
Check-in counters

In the early 2010s, additional airlines began operating scheduled services to Alor in response to growing demand for travel to the island. In January 2015, Wings Air began operating the Kupang–Kalabahi route using ATR 72-500 and ATR 72-600 aircraft. Susi Air also briefly operated a pioneer route between Alor and Atambua, launched in April 2014 with three weekly flights. However, the service was discontinued in 2015 due to low passenger demand. Garuda Indonesia was also reportedly interested at the time in launching a route between Alor and Kupang.

In 2019, NAM Air, a subsidiary of Sriwijaya Air, launched a direct route between Kalabahi and Denpasar, Bali, using the ATR 72-600, providing passengers with a connection between the two cities without the need to transit in Kupang. However, the service was short-lived. As of 2026, Wings Air is currently the sole airline serving the airport, operating the only scheduled route between Kalabahi and Kupang.

To attract more tourists, the Alor Regency Government has proposed upgrading the airport to international status, which would enable direct flights to Dili in Timor-Leste, as well as restoring the former route to Denpasar and potentially establishing a new service to Labuan Bajo, the gateway to the Komodo Islands. From both geopolitical and geoeconomic perspectives, the airport's location in Alor is strategically important due to the island's proximity to Indonesia's international border with Timor-Leste and its role in supporting national defense and security.

== Facilities and development ==
=== Landside facilities ===
VIP area

Baggage claim area

A new passenger terminal was constructed between 2018 and 2022 and was inaugurated by then-Minister of Transportation Budi Karya Sumadi. The two-story passenger terminal has a floor area of approximately 600 m² (6,458 sq ft) and a peak-hour capacity of around 120 passengers.

The terminal was designed in a modern architectural style incorporating elements of traditional Alorese architecture. The building features an open design, allowing passengers in the departure lounges and visitors elsewhere within the airport to enjoy the natural air and surrounding environment. The terminal is equipped with a range of passenger facilities, including a baggage conveyor system, elevators, escalators, and security screening equipment. Other facilities include two spacious departure lounges on the second floor, modern restrooms, retail outlets, airline service counters, and an arrivals area on the ground floor. The terminal also features a spacious passenger drop-off area, a reflecting pool, an open-air smoking area, landscaped spaces decorated with Alor's distinctive black stones, and a spacious terminal forecourt with adequate parking for both two- and four-wheeled vehicles. Construction of the new terminal cost approximately 70 billion rupiah.

=== Airside facilities ===
On the airside, the airport is equipped with a single runway measuring 1,600 m × 30 m (5,249 ft × 98 ft), capable of accommodating aircraft up to the size of the ATR 72. The runway is equipped with two runway turn pads, each measuring 85 m × 7 m (279 ft × 23 ft), at both ends, as well as a Runway End Safety Area (RESA) measuring 90 m × 60 m (295 ft × 197 ft). The runway is a non-instrument runway and lacks published straight-in instrument approach procedures and electronic navigation aids such as an Instrument Landing System (ILS), requiring aircraft operating at the airport to rely on visual approaches and restricting flight operations to daylight hours. Plans are underway to extend the runway by 250 m to 1,850 m (6,070 ft), with a further extension to up to 2,000 m (6,562 ft) planned in the longer term. The proposed extensions would enable the airport to accommodate larger narrow-body aircraft such as the Boeing 737 and Airbus A320.

In addition to the runway, the airport is equipped with a single taxiway measuring 60 m × 21 m (197 ft × 69 ft) and a single aircraft apron measuring 100 m × 40 m (328 ft × 131 ft), capable of accommodating two ATR 72 aircraft. The apron is planned to be widened toward the current terminal to accommodate more and larger aircraft, with the expansion requiring the demolition of the old terminal building.

== Airlines and destinations ==
| Airlines | Destinations |
|---|---|
| Wings Air | Kupang |

== Statistics ==
ATC tower

A Wings Air ATR 72-500 at Mali Airport

Annual passenger numbers and aircraft statistics
| Year | Passengers handled | Passenger % change | Cargo (tonnes) | Cargo % change | Aircraft movements | Aircraft % change |
|---|---|---|---|---|---|---|
| 2006 | 20,270 | Steady | 36.92 | Steady | 674 | Steady |
| 2007 | 22,931 | ▲13.1 | 34.92 | ▼5.4 | 694 | ▲3.0 |
| 2008 | 22,237 | ▼3.0 | 34.81 | ▼0.3 | 724 | ▲4.3 |
| 2009 | 30,165 | ▲35.7 | 40.54 | ▲16.5 | 722 | ▼0.3 |
| 2010 | 28,981 | ▼3.9 | 25.65 | ▼36.7 | 696 | ▼3.6 |
| 2011 | 49,340 | ▲70.2 | 58.30 | ▲127.3 | 1,292 | ▲85.6 |
| 2012 | 52,578 | ▲6.6 | 25.60 | ▼56.1 | 1,252 | ▼3.1 |
| 2013 | 57,915 | ▲10.2 | 115.60 | ▲351.6 | 1,304 | ▲4.2 |
| 2014 | 57,164 | ▼1.3 | 83.53 | ▼27.7 | 1,454 | ▲11.5 |
| 2015 | 67,554 | ▲18.2 | 84.71 | ▲1.4 | 1,528 | ▲5.1 |
| 2016 | 102,382 | ▲51.6 | 452.75 | ▲434.5 | 2,212 | ▲44.8 |
| 2017 | 115,395 | ▲12.7 | 152.02 | ▼66.4 | 2,490 | ▲12.6 |
| 2018 | 98,737 | ▼14.4 | 103.16 | ▼32.1 | 1,788 | ▼28.2 |
| 2019 | 98,875 | ▲0.1 | 185.25 | ▲79.6 | 2,754 | ▲54.0 |
| 2020 | 58,523 | ▼40.8 | 141.21 | ▼23.8 | 1,128 | ▼59.0 |
| 2021 | 44,342 | ▼24.2 | 204.94 | ▲45.1 | 842 | ▼25.4 |
| 2022 | 44,397 | ▲0.1 | 249.86 | ▲21.9 | 782 | ▼7.1 |
| 2023 | 38,762 | ▼12.7 | 173.35 | ▼30.6 | 722 | ▼7.7 |
| 2024 | 41,007 | ▲5.8 | 176.58 | ▲1.9 | 708 | ▼1.9 |
^{Source: DGCA, BPS}
