= Dave Parro =

Canadian ice hockey player

- Born: April 30, 1957 (age 67); Saskatoon, Saskatchewan, Canada
- Height: 5 ft 10 in (178 cm)
- Weight: 155 lb (70 kg; 11 st 1 lb)
- Position: Goaltender
- Caught: Left
- Played for: Washington Capitals
- NHL draft: 34th overall, 1977; Boston Bruins
- WHA draft: 90th overall, 1977; Houston Aeros
- Playing career: 1977–1987

David E. Parro (born April 30, 1957) is a Canadian former professional ice hockey goaltender. He played 77 games in the National Hockey League with the Washington Capitals from 1981 to 1984. The rest of his career, which lasted from 1977 to 1987, was spent in the minor leagues.

== Playing career ==
Parro was born in Saskatoon, Saskatchewan. He was selected at 34th overall by the Boston Bruins in the 1977 NHL Amateur Draft, the first goalie chosen. Before getting the chance to play for Boston, Parro was claimed by the Quebec Nordiques in the 1979 NHL Expansion Draft. Two days later, the Nordiques traded him to the Washington Capitals. After remaining in the Capitals' organization until 1984, Parro spent several seasons in the International Hockey League before retiring in 1987.

Parro was the first goalie taken in the 1977 NHL Entry Draft, he was also the final player overall to be drafted by the World Hockey Association, as the Houston Aeros chose him with the final pick, 90th overall, in the 10th round of the 1977 WHA Amateur Draft.

== Career statistics ==
=== Regular season and playoffs ===
			Regular season									Playoffs
Season	Team	League	GP	W	L	T	MIN	GA	SO	GAA	SV%	GP	W	L	T	MIN	GA	SO	GAA	SV%
1973–74	Saskatoon Olympics	SJHL	29	—	—	—	1740	137	0	4.21	—	—	—	—	—	—	—	—	—	—
1974–75	Saskatoon Olympics	SJHL	35	—	—	—	2100	136	0	4.34	—	—	—	—	—	—	—	—	—	—
1974–75	Saskatoon Blades	WCHL	1	1	0	0	60	2	0	2.00	—	—	—	—	—	—	—	—	—	—
1975–76	Saskatoon Blades	WCHL	36	28	6	2	2100	119	1	3.40	—	9	1	3	1	414	31	0	4.49	—
1976–77	Saskatoon Blades	WCHL	69	28	26	12	3956	246	1	3.73	.893	6	2	4	—	360	23	0	3.83	.895
1977–78	Rochester Americans	AHL	46	25	16	3	2964	164	0	3.65	.890	3	2	1	—	180	9	0	3.00	—
1978–79	Grand Rapids Owls	IHL	7	—	—	—	419	25	0	3.58	—	—	—	—	—	—	—	—	—	—
1978–79	Rochester Americans	AHL	36	12	15	5	2065	130	2	3.78	—	—	—	—	—	—	—	—	—	—
1979–80	Hershey Bears	AHL	54	20	30	3	3159	172	0	3.27	—	—	—	—	—	—	—	—	—	—
1980–81	Washington Capitals	NHL	18	4	7	2	809	49	1	3.64	.888	—	—	—	—	—	—	—	—	—
1980–81	Hershey Bears	AHL	14	7	6	1	834	60	0	4.32	—	—	—	—	—	—	—	—	—	—
1981–82	Washington Capitals	NHL	52	16	26	7	2938	206	1	4.21	.874	—	—	—	—	—	—	—	—	—
1982–83	Washington Capitals	NHL	6	1	3	1	261	19	0	4.38	.849	—	—	—	—	—	—	—	—	—
1982–83	Hershey Bears	AHL	47	21	20	4	2714	175	1	3.87	—	—	—	—	—	—	—	—	—	—
1983–84	Washington Capitals	NHL	1	0	0	0	1	0	0	0.00	1.000	—	—	—	—	—	—	—	—	—
1983–84	Hershey Bears	AHL	42	12	21	5	2277	190	1	5.07	—	—	—	—	—	—	—	—	—	—
1984–85	Salt Lake Golden Eagles	IHL	28	11	14	3	1672	102	0	3.66	—	—	—	—	—	—	—	—	—	—
1985–86	Flint Spirits	IHL	46	10	34	0	2527	235	0	5.30	—	—	—	—	—	—	—	—	—	—
1985–86	Fort Wayne Komets	IHL	5	1	3	1	305	18	0	3.54	—	—	—	—	—	—	—	—	—	—
1986–87	Indianapolis Checkers	IHL	32	16	14	0	1780	124	4	4.18	—	—	—	—	—	—	—	—	—	—
NHL totals			77	21	36	10	4006	274	2	4.10	.876	—	—	—	—	—	—	—	—	—

== Awards ==
- WCHL Second All-Star Team – 1976 and 1977
