= Piro =

Piro may refer to:

== People ==
=== People with the name ===
- Ferdinando Piro, Italian footballer
- Hank Piro, American football player
- Osvaldo Piro (1937–2025), Argentine bandoneonist, conductor, arranger, and tango composer
- Saint Pyr, or Piro, the 6th century founder of the monastery at Caldey Island, near Manorbier, Wales

=== Ethnic groups ===
- Mashco-Piro, an uncontacted tribe in Peru
- Piro people, commonly called Yine, an indigenous people in Peru
- Piro people (New Mexico), a former tribe of Puebloans who lived along the Rio Grande River in North America.

== Other uses ==
- Piro (Megatokyo), a character in the webcomic Megatokyo and the artist's online pseudonym
- Piro (production company), an American film production company
- Piro, Inc., advertising company based in New York City, US
- Piro, Bihar, a town in Bihar, India
- Yine language or Piro language of the Maipurean family in Brazil

== See also ==
- Pirro (disambiguation)
