= Alor Regency =

Regency in East Nusa Tenggara, Indonesia

Alor Regency Kabupaten Alor
- Regency
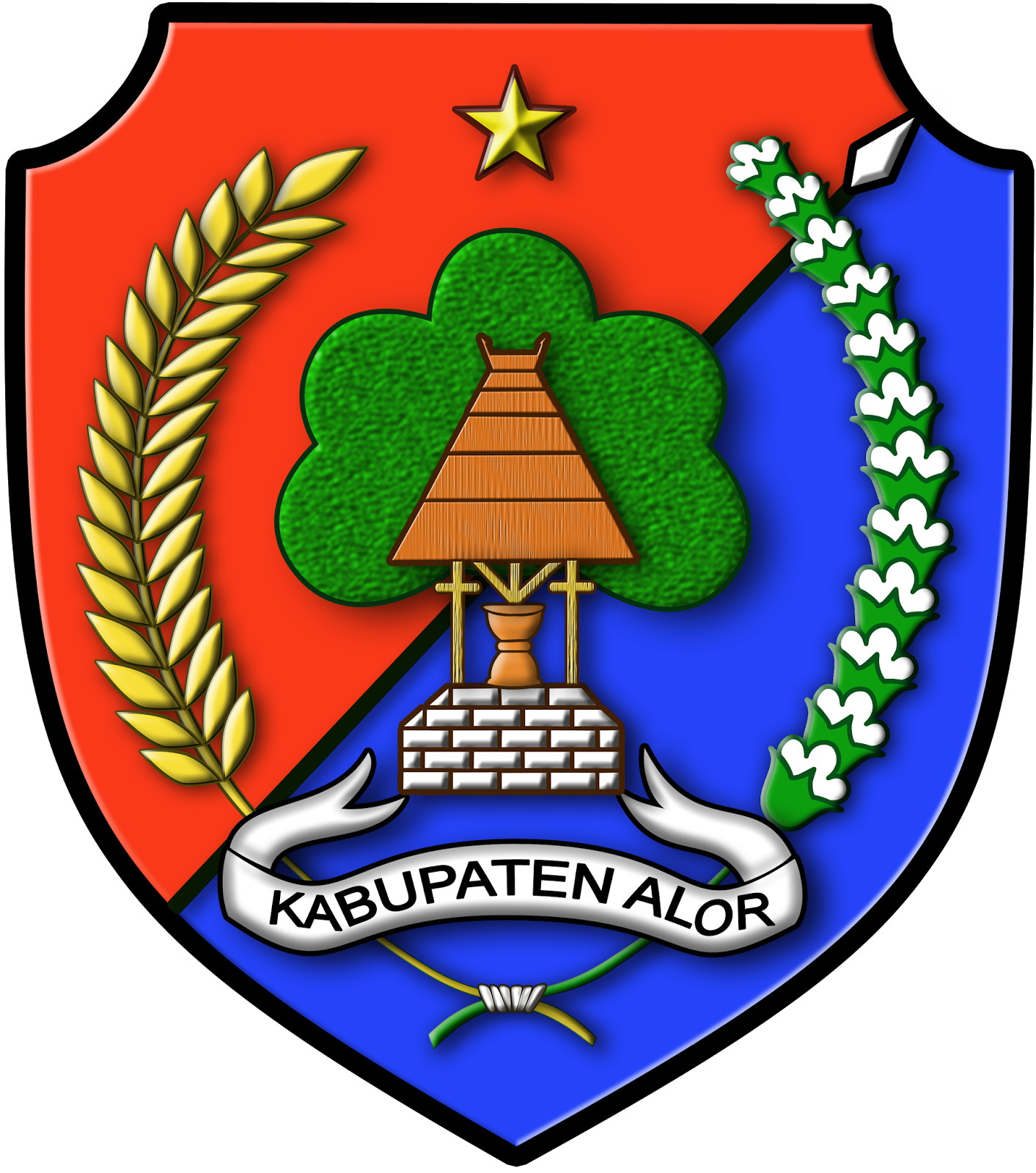
- Coat of arms

- Location within East Nusa Tenggara

- Location in Lesser Sunda Islands and Indonesia Alor Regency (Indonesia)
- Coordinates: 8.3°S 124.5°E
- Country: Indonesia
- Province: East Nusa Tenggara
- Capital: Kalabahi

Government
  - Regent: Iskandar Lakamau
  - Vice Regent: Rocky Winaryo

Area
  - Total: 1,126.96 sq mi (2,918.82 km^{2})

Population (mid 2025 estimate)
  - Total: 228,504
  - Density: 202.761/sq mi (78.2864/km^{2})
- Time zone: UTC+8 (ICST)
- Area code: (+62) 386
- Website: alorkab.go.id

Alor Regency (Indonesian: Kabupaten Alor) is a regency (kabupaten) in East Nusa Tenggara (NTT) province of Indonesia. Established on 5 August 1958, Alor Regency administers the Alor Archipelago with its administrative seat (capital) in Kalabahi on Alor Island.

Alor Regency occupies 2,918.82 km^{2} of land area and 10,973.62 km^{2} of sea area. There are seventeen islands in the archipelago, of which the largest by far are Alor itself and Pantar; there are another six inhabited islands (including Pura, Treweng, Kepa, Buaya, Kangge and Kura); the remaining nine islands (Sika, Nub, Kapas, Batang, Lapang, Ternate, Rusa, Tikus and Kambing) are uninhabited. To the east lies the island of (Atauro), part of the Republic of Timor Leste. Pantar and Alor Islands are separated by a wide strait with Pulau Buaya and Pulau Kambing at its northern point, Pulau Pura in the middle, and Pulau Treweng at its southern point. The regency had 190,026 inhabitants at the 2010 decennial census; at the 2020 census this had risen to 211,872; the official estimate as of mid-2025 was 228,504.

The main transportation access in the regency is by means of sea. The state-owned PELNI sea liners operate in the archipelago for major transport to the main port hub in Kalabahi beside small boats operating between small islands. The Alor Island Airport is located 18 km east of Kalabahi, and is used to be accessed by CASA airplanes, operated by Merpati Nusantara Airlines. In 2018, the airport undergo massive overhaul, and due to Merpati's bankruptcy, the flight routes were currently operated by Wings Air.

As is the case in other parts of NTT province, the provision of education is often a major problem, especially in remote areas. In recent years, the district (regency) government has been trying to make it easier for children to attend school by, amongst other things, increasing the number of one-roof junior high schools. The standard of teaching is often also a major problem because many teachers lack proper qualifications.

== Administration ==
At the 2010 Census the regency was divided into seventeen districts (kecamatan), but an eighteenth district (Abad Selatan) was created in 2020 from part of the Alor Barat Daya District. All eighteen districts are tabulated below with their areas and their populations at the 2010 census and the 2020 census, together with the official estimates as of mid-2025. The table also includes the locations of the district administrative centres, the number of administrative villages in each district (totaling 158 rural desa and 17 urban kelurahan), and its post code.

Kode Wilayah	Name of District (kecamatan)	English name	Area in km^{2}	Pop'n census 2010	Pop'n census 2020	Pop'n estimate mid 2025	Admin centre	No. of villages	Post codes
53.05.06	Pantar ^{(a)}		126.64	8,798	10,069	10,989	Kabir	11 ^{(b)}	85881
63.05.09	Pantar Barat ^{(c)}	West Pantar	71.38	6,729	6,878	7,107	Baranusa	7	85880
53.05.14	Pantar Timur ^{(d)}	East Pantar	161.32	10,740	11,368	11,946	Bakalang	11	85884
53.05.17	Pantar Barat Laut ^{(e)}	Northwest Pantar	145.68	4,276	4,946	5,426	Marisa	7	85882
53.05.16	Pantar Tengah	Central Pantar	266.96	9,313	9,750	10,192	Maliang	10	85883
	Pantar	Total Pantar Island	771.98	39,856	43,011	45,660		46	
53.05.03	Alor Barat Daya	Southwest Alor	295.69	21,530	18,327	20,214	Moru	13 ^{(f)}	85861
53.05.12	Mataru		127.09	5,582	6,043	6,420	Kalunan	7	85860
53.05.18	Abad Selatan	South Abad	127.64	^{(g)}	6,283	6,642	Tribur	7	85861
53.05.04	Alor Selatan	South Alor	205.95	8,886	9,929	10,711	Apui	14 ^{(h)}	85871
53.05.05	Alor Timur	East Alor	560.70	7,505	8,609	9,406	Maritaing	10 ^{(i)}	85870
53.05.08	Alor Timur Laut	Northeast Alor	203.33	8,600	9,117	9,588	Bukapiting	8	85873
53.05.13	Pureman		137.93	3,471	3,561	3,686	Peitoko	4	85874
53.05.01	Teluk Mutiara ^{(j)}	Mutiara Bay	67.63	48,410	53,339	57,151	Kalabahi	16 ^{(k)}	85811 -85819
53.05.10	Kabola ^{(l)}		75.38	7,326	8,385	9,151	Wolibang	5 ^{(m)}	85819 ^{(n)}
53.05.02	Alor Barat Laut ^{(p)}	Northwest Alor	108.96	18,765	22,961	25,883	Kokar	19 ^{(q)}	85851
53.05.07	Alor Tengah Utara	North Central Alor	139.58	10,919	12,322	13,357	Alim Mebung	14	85870
53.05.15	Lembur		69.35	4,131	4,501	4,797	Alemba	6	85875
	Alor	Total Alor Island	2,119.23	145,125	163,377	177,006		123	
53.05.11	Pulau Pura ^{(r)}	Pura Island	27.59	5,045	5,484	5,838	Bolamelang	6 ^{(s)}	85874

Notes: (a) includes just the northern part of Pantar Island. (b) includes the kelurahan of Kabir. (c) includes offshore islands of Pulau Kura and uninhabited Pulau Batang and Pulau Lapang.
(d) includes offshore Pulau Treweng. (e) includes offshore islands of Pulau Kangge and uninhabited Pulau Kambing, Pulau Rusa and Pulau Tikus. (f) including the kelurahan of Moru.
(g) the 2010 population of the new Abad Selatan District is included with the figure for Alor Barat Daya District, from which it was subsequently split off in 2020.
(h) including the kelurahan of Kelaisi Timur. (i) including the kelurahan of Kolana Utara.
(j) including the town of Kalabahi, and neighbouring rural desa on both sides of Mutiara Bay, plus uninhabited Pulau Kapas.
(k) comprises 10 kelurahan (Kalabahi Barat, Kalabahi Kota, Kalabahi Tengah, Kalabahi Timur, Binongko, Nusa Kenari, Welai Barat, Welai Timur, Mutiara and Wetabua) and 6 desa.
(l) includes the uninhabited offshore islands of Sika and Nub. (m) includes the kelurahan of Kabola. (n) apart from villages of Alila Timur and Lawahing (which have a postcode of 85851).
(p) includes the offshore islands of Pulau Kepa, Pulau Buaya and uninhabited Pulau Ternate. (q) includes the kelurahan of Adang.
(r) Pura island lies in the middle of the strait which separates Pantar and Alor Islands. (s) includes the kelurahan of Pura.
