= Alor Island =

Island in Indonesia

Alor
Native name: Pulau Alor
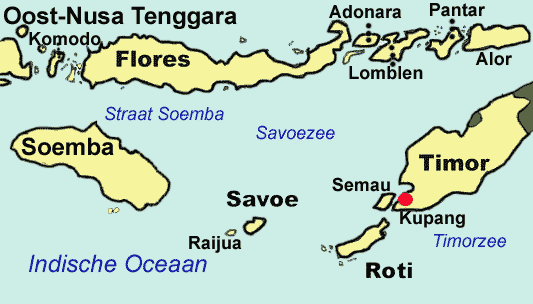
- Map of the islands of East Nusa Tenggara, including Alor in the far northeast

- Location in Lesser Sunda Islands

Geography
- Location: Lesser Sunda Islands
- Coordinates: 8°16′S 124°45′E
- Archipelago: Alor archipelago
- Area: 2,124.92 km^{2} (820.44 sq mi)
- Highest elevation: 1,423 m (4669 ft)
- Highest point: Gunung Muna

Administration
- Indonesia
- Province: East Nusa Tenggara
- Regency: Alor Regency
- Largest settlement: Kalabahi (pop. 19,210)

Demographics
- Population: 177,006 (mid 2025 estimate)
- Pop. density: 83.5/km^{2} (216.3/sq mi)

Additional information
- ^a A total of 12 out of 18 districts in Alor Regency, and including several small islands.

Alor (Indonesian: Pulau Alor) is the largest island in the Alor Archipelago and is one of the 92 officially listed outlying islands of Indonesia. It is located at the eastern end of the Lesser Sunda Islands chain that runs through southeastern Indonesia, which from the west include such islands as Bali, Lombok, Sumbawa, Komodo, and Flores.

To the east of the island across the Ombai Strait lie the islands of Wetar (in Maluku Province) and Atauro, the latter belonging to East Timor. To the south, across the Strait of Alor, lies the western part of Timor. To the north lies the Banda Sea. To the west lies Pantar and the other islands of the Alor archipelago, and further yet the rest of the Sunda Islands.

Alor Island, as well as the rest of its archipelago, is part of East Nusa Tenggara province.

== Geography ==
Alor has an area of about 2,119 km^{2}, making it the largest island of the Alor archipelago. Kalabahi is the only town on the island of Alor, with an estimated population of 19,210 in mid 2023. The variety of goods obtainable in Kalabahi is surprising considering its size and location. The 2010 census recorded the population of the island as 145,125 out of 190,026 in the regency. The 2020 census produced a total of 163,377, and the official estimate as at mid 2025 was 177,006.

Alor is of volcanic origin and has very rugged terrain. The main part of the island is mountainous, but there is a prominent peninsula along its north coast which includes the main town of Kalabahi; the peninsula encompasses the administrative districts of Alor Barat Laut and Kabola, plus the northern half of the Mutiara Bay District (kecamatan Teluk Mutiara). This peninsula is called the Bird's Head. The region near Kalabahi is the only flat area. This may be why the Dutch chose the location as the capital and main harbor (Alor-Kecil) in 1911.

On 12 November 2004, an earthquake occurred, killing 34 people, and injuring 400. The shock had a moment magnitude of 7.5 and a maximum Mercalli intensity of VIII (Severe).

== Administration ==
Alor Island comprises twelve of the eighteen districts of the Alor Regency, as follows, with the official estimates as at mid 2025. The table also includes the locations of the district administrative centres, the number of administrative villages in each district (totaling 107 rural desa (villages) and 16 urban kelurahan, and its post code.

53.05.03	Alor Barat Daya	Southwest Alor	295.69	21,530	18,327	20,214	Moru	13 ^{(a)}	85861
53.05.12	Mataru		127.09	5,582	6,043	6,420	Kalunan	7	85860
53.05.18	Abad Selatan	South Abad	127.64	^{(b)}	6,283	6,642	Tribur	7	85861
53.05.04	Alor Selatan	South Alor	205.95	8,886	9,929	10,711	Apui	14 ^{(c)}	85871
53.05.05	Alor Timur	East Alor	560.70	7,505	8,609	9,406	Maritaing	10 ^{(d)}	85870
53.05.08	Alor Timur Laut	Northeast Alor	203.33	8,600	9,117	9,588	Bukapiting	8	85873
53.05.13	Pureman		137.93	3,471	3,561	3,686	Peitoko	4	85874
53.05.01	Teluk Mutiara ^{(e)}	Mutiara Bay	67.63	48,410	53,339	57,151	Kalabahi	16 ^{(f)}	85811 -85819
53.05.10	Kabola		75.38^{(g)}	7,326	8,385	9,151	Wolibang	5 ^{(h)}	85819 ^{(i)}
53.05.02	Alor Barat Laut	Northwest Alor	108.96^{(j)}	18,765	22,961	25,883	Kokar	19 ^{(k)}	85851
53.05.07	Alor Tengah Utara	North Central Alor	139.58	10,919	12,322	13,357	Alim Mebung	14	85870
53.05.15	Lembur		69.35	4,131	4,501	4,797	Alemba	6	85875
	Alor	Total Alor Island	2,119.23	145,125	163,377	177,006		123	

Notes: (a) including the kelurahan of Moru.
(b) the 2010 population of the new Abad Selatan District is included with the figure for Alor Barat Daya District, from which it was subsequently split off in 2020.
(c) including the kelurahan of Kelaisi Timur. (d) including the kelurahan of Kolana Utara.
(e) including the town of Kalabahi, and neighbouring rural desa on both sides of Mutiara Bay, plus uninhabited Pulau Kapas.
(f) comprises 10 kelurahan (Kalabahi Barat, Kalabahi Kota, Kalabahi Tengah, Kalabahi Timur, Binongko, Nusa Kenari, Welai Barat, Welai Timur, Mutiara and Wetabua) and 6 desa.
(g) includes the uninhabited offshore islands of Sika and Nub. (h) includes the kelurahan of Kabola. (i) apart from villages of Alila Timur and Lawahing (which have a postcode of 85851).
(j) includes the offshore islands of Pulau Kepa, Pulau Buaya and uninhabited Pulau Ternate. (k) includes the kelurahan of Adang.

== Economy ==
The island's infrastructure is only weakly built. The inhabitants practice mainly subsistence agriculture. In the villages, vanilla, tamarind, almonds (Canarium) and other nuts are cultivated. In the forests sandalwood is cut down for trade.

The latest geological explorations have discovered valuable resources such as gypsum, kaolin, petroleum, natural gas, tin, gold, and diamonds. Alor's snorkelling and diving may promise an increase in tourism in the future. Alor hosts some of the most healthy and diverse corals in Indonesia and has areas of black volcanic sand for specialized scuba diving interests.

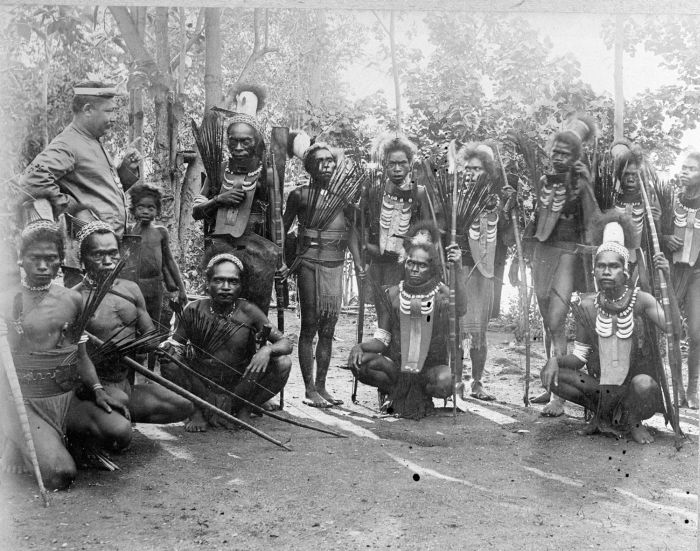
Alor warriors, circa late 1890's-early 1900's.

== Religion ==
211,872 people lived on Alor and Pantar in 2020, of whom 163,377 were on Alor itself; the official estimate as at mid 2023 was 171,275. 68.46% were Protestants, 25.65% Muslims and 3.04% Roman Catholics (in a few villages). Animistic rites and traditions are still strongly practiced.

== Language ==
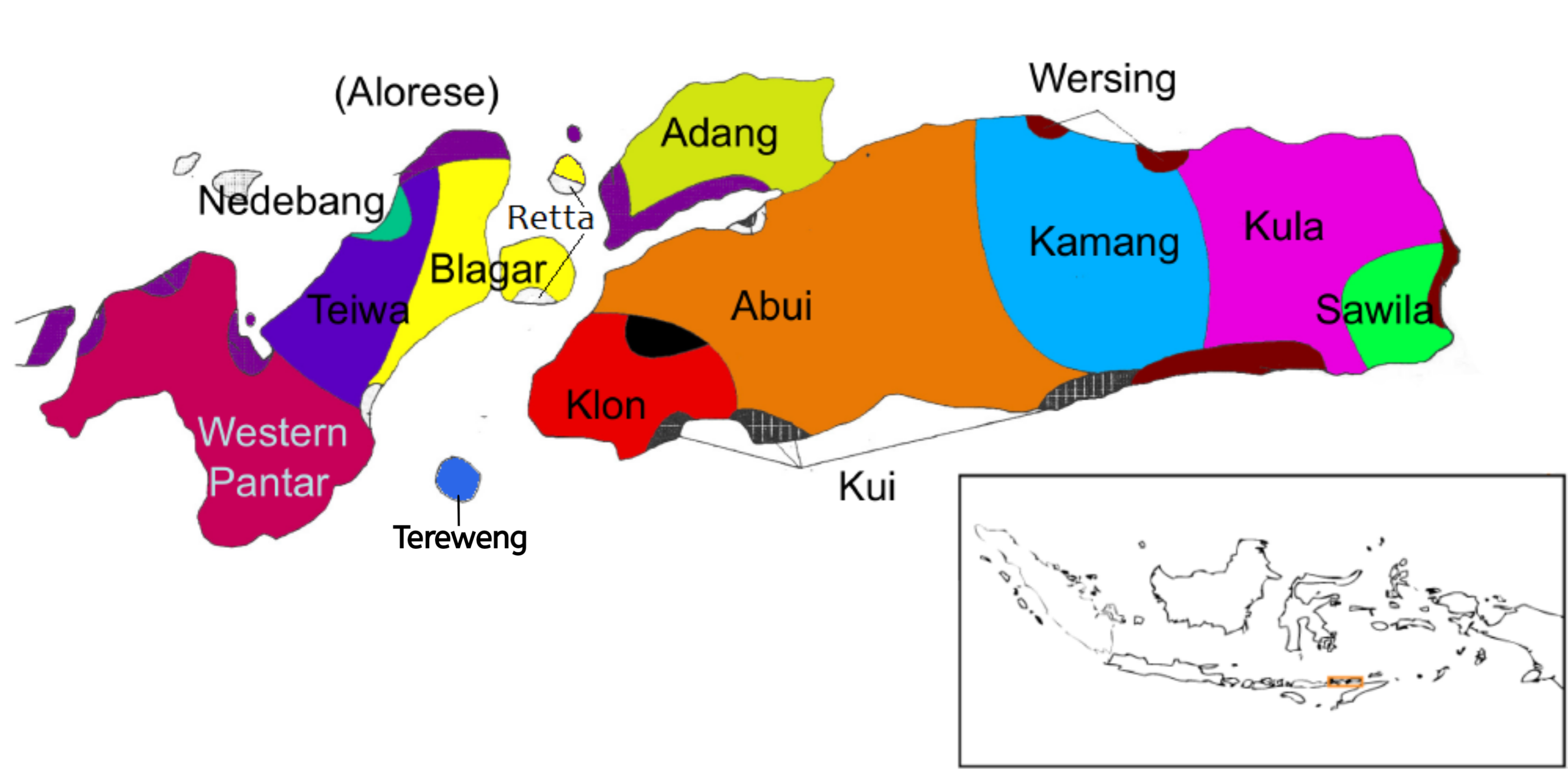
The languages of Pantar (left) and Alor (right). Adang (chartreuse) occupies the Alor Peninsula.

The majority of the more than fifteen indigenous languages spoken on Alor belong to the Papuan (non-Austronesian) family of Alor languages. These include Abui, Adang, Hamap, Kabola, Kafoa, Woisika, Kelon, and Kui. In addition, Alorese is a Malayo-Polynesian language which is spoken along the coast of the western and southern Bird's Head of Alor Island and in places on surrounding islands; it is a dialect of Lamaholot which is spoken in East Flores and the Solor Archipelago.

Many of the Papuan languages of Alor are endangered and are no longer being actively acquired by children. Some languages have fewer than 1000 speakers remaining. Significant linguistic documentation efforts have been undertaken recently by Leiden University. The language of daily communication is Alor Malay, a unique Malay variety with some similarities to Kupang Malay. Indonesian is taught in schools and used widely in media.

== Transportation ==
Alor is served by Alor Mali Airport (ARD). The airport is small, and all incoming and outgoing flights are thus via Kupang Airport (KOE). Alor is serviced 3–4 times daily by both Wings Air and NAM Air. Flights originating in Bali, Surabaya or Jakarta with the final destination of Alor stop in Kupang to change planes. There are no direct services from Labuan Bajo, Ende, Maumere or Makassar.

== See also ==
- List of islands of Indonesia
