= Timoric languages =

Subgroup of the Austronesian languages

Timoric
- Geographic distribution: Indonesia; East Timor
- Linguistic classification: Austronesian: Malayo-Polynesian; Central–Eastern?; Timoric
- Proto-language: Proto-Timoric
- Subdivisions: (disputed)

Language codes
- Glottolog: west2945 Central Timor timo1265 Timor-Babar

The Timoric languages are a group of Austronesian languages (belonging to the Central–Eastern subgroup) spoken on the islands of Timor, neighboring Wetar, and (depending on the classification) Southwest Maluku to the east.

Within the group, the languages with the most speakers are Uab Meto of West Timor, Indonesia and Tetun of East Timor, each with about half a million speakers, though in addition Tetun is an official language and a lingua franca among non-Tetun East Timorese.

== Languages ==
=== Hull (1998) & van Engelenhoven (2009) ===
Geoffrey Hull (1998) proposes a Timoric group as follows:

- Timoric
  - Timoric A ("Extra-Ramelaic", Fabronic; whatever is not Ramelaic)
    - West: Dawan (Uab Meto)–Amarasi, Helong, Roti (Bilba, Dengka, Lole, Ringgou, Dela-Oenale, Termanu, Tii)
    - Central: Tetun, Bekais, Habu
    - North: Wetar, Galoli
    - East: Kairui, Waimaha, Midiki, Naueti
  - Timoric B ("Ramelaic", near the Ramelau range)
    - West: Kemak, Tukudede
    - Central: Mambai
    - East (Idalaka): Idaté, Isní, Lakalei, Lolein

Van Engelenhoven (2009) accepts Hull's classification, but further includes Makuva and the Luangic–Kisaric languages (Kisar, Romang, Luang, Wetan, Leti) in the Eastern branch of Timoric A.

=== Taber (1993) ===
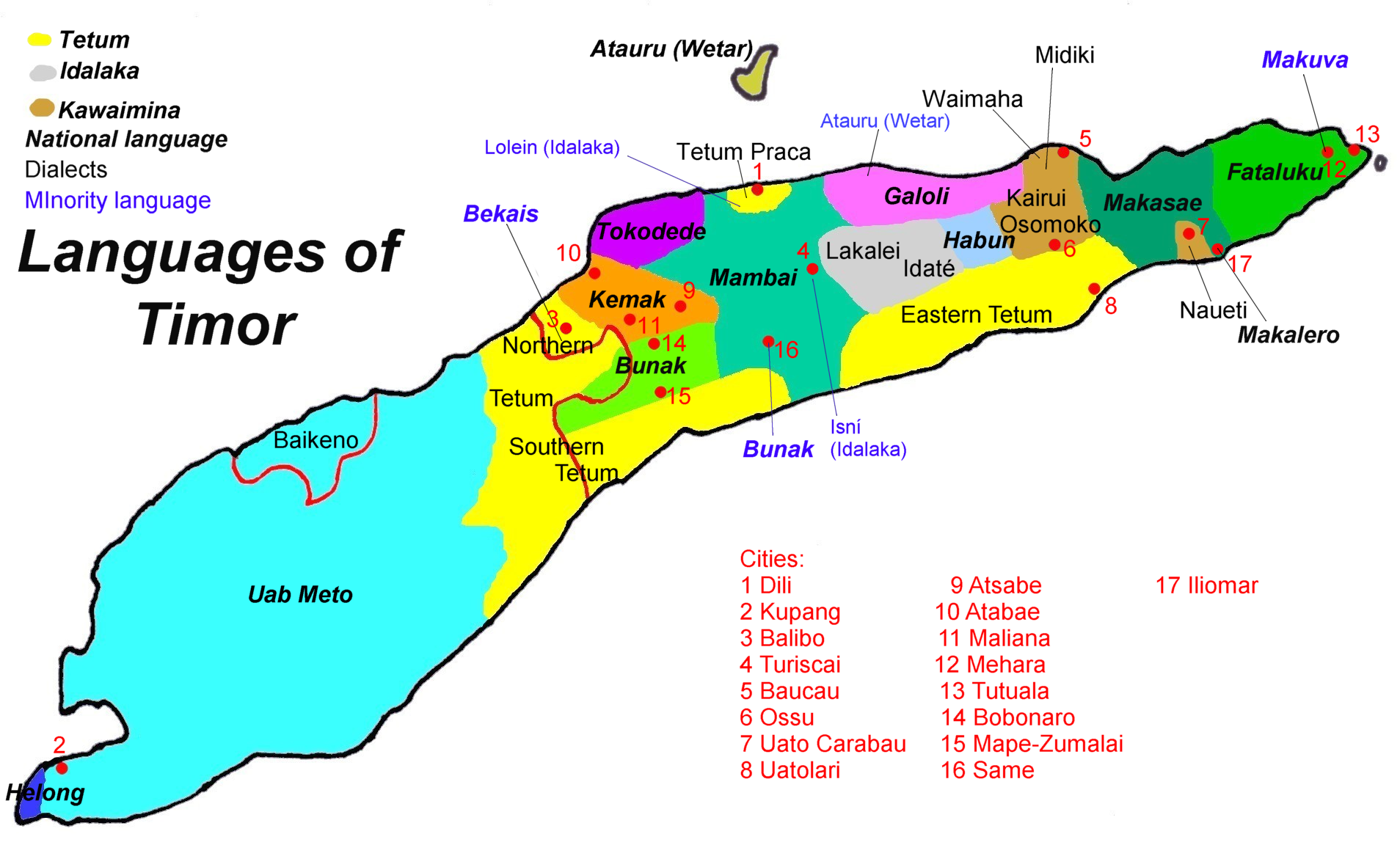
Languages of Timor Island

In a lexicostatistical classification of the languages of Southwest Maluku, Taber (1993:396) posits a "Southwest Maluku" branch of the Timoric languages, that comprises all languages of the area, except for West Damar and the Babar languages.

- Timoric
  - (other branches on Timor)
  - Southwest Maluku
    - East Damar
    - Wetar: Talur, Wetar cluster (Aputai, Perai, Tugun, Iliun)
    - Kisar-Roma: Kisar, Roma
    - Luang: Leti, Luang, Wetan
    - TNS (Teun-Nila-Serua): Teun, Nila-Serua (Nila, Serua)
- (other branches of CMP, including Babar languages and West Damar)

=== Edwards (2021) ===
Timor languages according to Edwards (2020)

Map of the Meto language cluster

Edwards (2021) divides the languages of Timor and Southwest Maluku into two main branches, Central Timor and Timor–Babar:

- Central Timor: Kemak, Tokodede, Mambae, Welaun
- Timor–Babar
  - Helong
  - Rote-Meto
    - West Rote-Meto
      - Dela, Oenale
      - Dengka-Meto
        - Dengka, Lelain
        - Meto
    - Nuclear Rote
      - Tii, Lole
      - Termanu, Ba'a, Korbafo, Bokai, Talae, Keka
      - Bilbaa, Diu, Lelenuk
      - Rikou, Landu, Oepao
  - Lakalei–Idate: Lakalei, Idate
  - Eastern Timor (Kawaimina): Kairui, Waimaha, Midiki, Naueti
  - Wetar–Atauro: Atauran, Galoli, Wetarese
  - Southwest Maluku: Kisar, Roma, Leti, Luang, Wetan, Teun, Nila, Serua, East Damar
    - Babar languages
