= ISO 639:r =

List of ISO 639-3 language codes starting with R

This is a list of ISO 639-3 language codes starting with R.

Index | a | b | c | d | e | f | g | h | i | j | k | l | m | n | o | p | q | r | s | t | u | v | w | x | y | z

Abbreviations are used in the table as follows:

- Scope: I = individual language, M = macrolanguage, S = special code
- Type: C = constructed, E = extinct (in recent times), H = historical (distinct from its modern form), L = living, S = special code

Deprecated codes are enclosed in (parentheses).

The column Family contains the generic English name of the language's family or macrolanguage.

ISO 639 codes			Scope/Type	Family	Language names	
639-3	639-1	639-2/B	Scope/Type	Family	Native	ISO name
raa			I/L			Dungmali
rab			I/L			Camling
rac			I/L			Rasawa
rad			I/L			Rade
(rae)			I/L			Ranau
raf			I/L			Western Meohang
rag			I/L			Logooli; Lulogooli
rah			I/L			Rabha
rai			I/L			Ramoaaina
raj		raj	M/L			Rajasthani
rak			I/L			Tulu-Bohuai
ral			I/L			Ralte
ram			I/L			Canela
ran			I/L			Riantana
rao			I/L			Rao
rap		rap	I/L		rapanui	Rapanui
raq			I/L	Sino-Tibetan		Saam
rar		rar	I/L		Māori Kūki 'Āirani	Cook Islands Maori; Rarotongan
ras			I/L			Tegali
rat			I/L			Razajerdi
rau			I/L			Raute
rav			I/L	Sino-Tibetan		Sampang
raw			I/L			Rawang
rax			I/L			Rang
ray			I/L			Rapa
raz			I/L			Rahambuu
rbb			I/L			Rumai Palaung
rbk			I/L			Northern Bontok
rbl			I/L			Miraya Bikol
rbp			I/E			Barababaraba
rcf			I/L		Kréol Rénioné	Réunion Creole French
rdb			I/L			Rudbari
rea			I/L			Rerau
reb			I/L			Rembong
ree			I/L			Rejang Kayan
reg			I/L			Kara (Tanzania)
rei			I/L			Reli
rej			I/L			Rejang
rel			I/L			Rendille
rem			I/E			Remo
ren			I/L			Rengao
rer			I/E	unclassified		Rer Bare
res			I/L			Reshe
ret			I/L			Retta
rey			I/L			Reyesano
rga			I/L			Roria
rge			I/L			Romano-Greek
rgk			I/E			Rangkas
rgn			I/L	Indo-European	Rumagnôl	Romagnol
rgr			I/L			Resígaro
rgs			I/L			Southern Roglai
rgu			I/L			Ringgou
rhg			I/L	Indo-European	𐴌𐴗𐴥𐴝𐴙𐴚𐴒𐴙𐴝	Rohingya
rhp			I/L			Yahang
ria			I/L	Sino-Tibetan		Riang (India)
rib			I/L			Bribri Sign Language
(rie)			I/L	spurious language		Rien
rif			I/L			Tarifit
ril			I/L			Riang (Myanmar); Riang Lang
rim			I/L			Nyaturu
rin			I/L			Nungu
rir			I/L			Ribun
rit			I/L			Ritharrngu
riu			I/L			Riung
(rjb)			I/L			Rajbanshi
rjg			I/L			Rajong
rji			I/L			Raji
rjs			I/L			Rajbanshi
rka			I/L			Kraol
rkb			I/L			Rikbaktsa
rkh			I/L			Rakahanga-Manihiki
rki			I/L	Sino-Tibetan	ရက္ခိုင်ဘာသာ	Rakhine
rkm			I/L			Marka
rkt			I/L	Indo-European	রংপুরী	Kamta; Rangpuri
rkw			I/E			Arakwal
rma			I/L			Rama
rmb			I/L			Rembarrnga
rmc			I/L			Carpathian Romani
rmd			I/E			Traveller Danish
rme			I/L		Romanichal	Angloromani
rmf			I/L		Romanó Kaló	Kalo Finnish Romani
rmg			I/L			Traveller Norwegian
rmh			I/L			Murkim
rmi			I/L			Lomavren
rmk			I/L			Romkun
rml			I/L			Baltic Romani
rmm			I/L			Roma
rmn			I/L			Balkan Romani
rmo			I/L		Sinto	Sinte Romani
rmp			I/L			Rempi
rmq			I/L			Caló
(rmr)			I/L		caló	Caló
rms			I/L			Romanian Sign Language
rmt			I/L			Domari
rmu			I/L			Tavringer Romani
rmv			I/C			Romanova
rmw			I/L			Welsh Romani
rmx			I/L	Austroasiatic		Romam
rmy			I/L			Vlax Romani
rmz			I/L	Sino-Tibetan		Marma
(rna)			I/E	spurious language		Runa
rnb			I/L			Brunca Sign Language
rnd			I/L			Ruund
rng			I/L			Ronga
rnl			I/L			Ranglong
rnn			I/L			Roon
rnp			I/L			Rongpo
rnr			I/E			Nari Nari
rnw			I/L			Rungwa
rob			I/L			Tae'
roc			I/L			Cacgia Roglai
rod			I/L			Rogo
roe			I/L			Ronji
rof			I/L			Rombo
rog			I/L			Northern Roglai
roh	rm	roh	I/L	Indo-European	rumantsch	Romansh
rol			I/L			Romblomanon
rom		rom	M/L		रोमानो	Romany
ron	ro	rum	I/L	Indo-European	română	Moldavian; Moldovan; Romanian
roo			I/L			Rotokas
rop			I/L			Kriol
ror			I/L			Rongga
rou			I/L			Runga
row			I/L			Dela-Oenale
rpn			I/L			Repanbitip
rpt			I/L			Rapting
rri			I/L			Ririo
rrm			I/E	Austronesian	Ta Rē Moriori	Moriori
rro			I/L			Waima
rrt			I/E			Arritinngithigh
rsb			I/L			Romano-Serbian
(rsi)			I/L	spurious language		Rennellese Sign Language
rsk			I/L	Indo-European	Руски	Ruthenian; Rusnak
rsl			I/L			Russian Sign Language
rsm			I/L			Miriwoong Sign Language
rsn			I/L	unclear		Rwandan Sign Language
rsw			I/L	Niger–Congo		Rishiwa
rtc			I/L			Rungtu Chin
rth			I/L			Ratahan
rtm			I/L			Rotuman
rts			I/E	Uralic		Yurats
rtw			I/L			Rathawi
rub			I/L			Gungu
ruc			I/L	Niger–Congo?	Luduuli	Ruuli
rue			I/L		русин	Rusyn
ruf			I/L			Luguru
rug			I/L			Roviana
ruh			I/L			Ruga
rui			I/L			Rufiji
ruk			I/L			Che
run	rn	run	I/L	Niger–Congo	kiRundi	Rundi
ruo			I/L		istroromånă	Istro Romanian
rup		rup	I/L		Armăneashce	Aromanian; Arumanian; Macedo-Romanian
ruq			I/L		meglenoromană	Megleno Romanian
rus	ru	rus	I/L	Indo-European	русский	Russian
rut			I/L			Rutul
ruu			I/L			Lanas Lobu
ruy			I/L			Mala (Nigeria)
ruz			I/L			Ruma
rwa			I/L			Rawo
rwk			I/L			Rwa
rwl			I/L	Niger–Congo		Ruwila
rwm			I/L			Amba (Uganda)
rwo			I/L			Rawa
rwr			I/L			Marwari (India)
(rws)			I/L			Rawas
rxd			I/L			Ngardi
rxw			I/E			Garuwali; Karuwali
ryn			I/L			Northern Amami-Oshima
rys			I/L			Yaeyama
ryu			I/L		うちなーぐち	Central Okinawan
rzh			I/L			Rāziḥī

== Sources ==
- "ISO 639-2 Registration Authority". Library of Congress.
- "ISO 639-3 Registration Authority". SIL International.
- Lewis, M. Paul; Simons, Gary F.; Fennig, Charles D., eds. (2016). "Ethnologue: Languages of the World" (19th ed.). Dallas, Texas: SIL International.
