= Damar language =

Damar language may be either of two languages spoken on Damar Island:

- East Damar language
- West Damar language.

They are not closely related.
