= Serua =

Serua may refer to:

- Serua Island, an island in Indonesia
  - Serua language
- Serua Province, a province in Fiji
  - Serua District
  - Serua (Fijian Communal Constituency, Fiji)
- Šerua (Serua), a Mesopotamian goddess
