= Atauran language =

Language spoken in Timor-Leste

Atauran
- Native to: Timor-Leste
- Region: Atauro, Manatuto
- Native speakers: 7,900 (2015)
- Language family: Austronesian: Malayo-Polynesian; Timor-Babar; Wetar-Atauro; Atauran
- Dialects: Rasua; Raklungu ("Adabe"); Hresuk; Dadu'a

Official status
- Recognised minority language in: Timor-Leste

Language codes
- ISO 639-3: adb
- Glottolog: adab1235 Adabe (spurious)
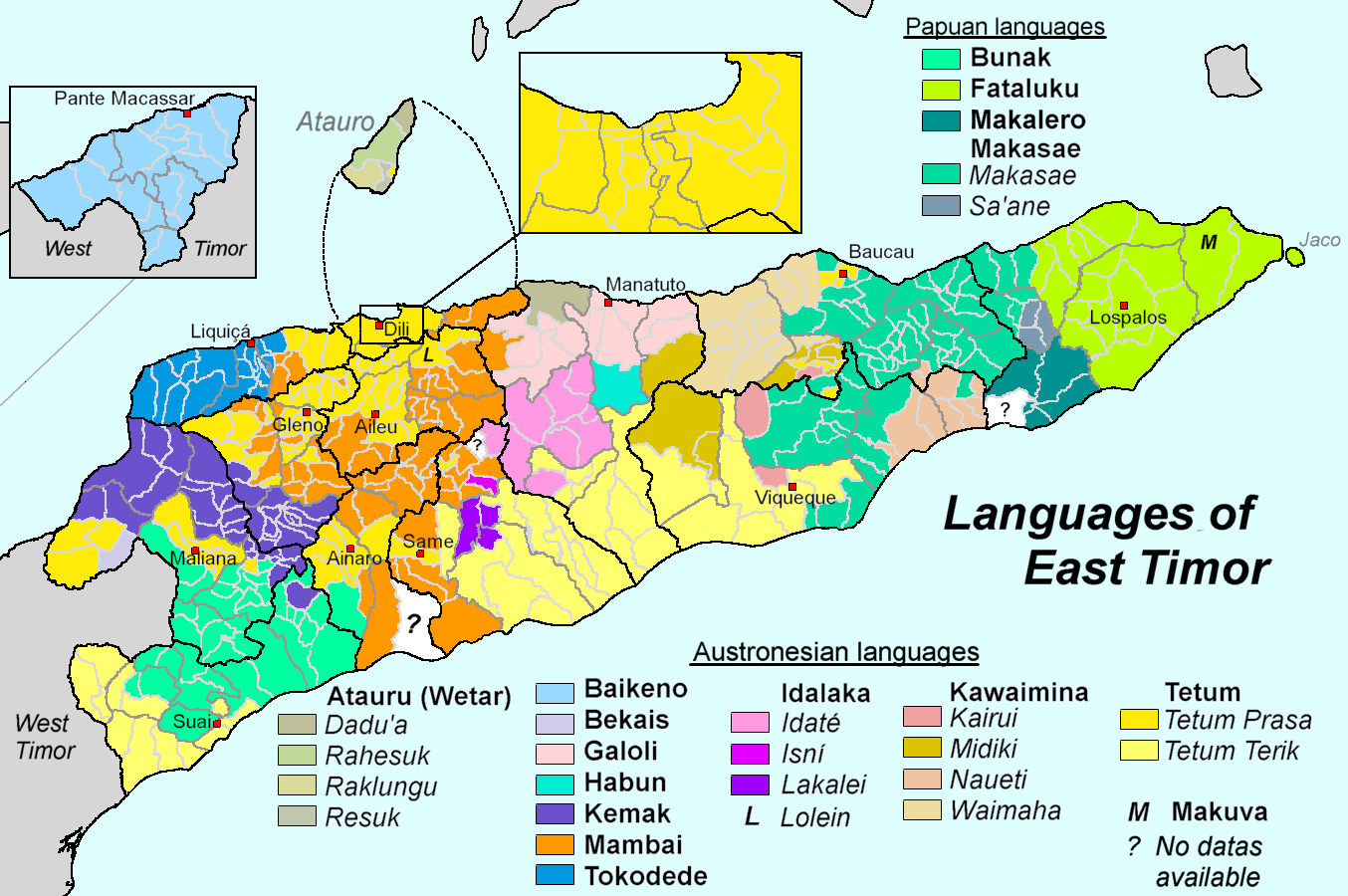

- Atauran is classified as Vulnerable by the UNESCO Atlas of the World's Languages in Danger.

Atauran is an Austronesian language spoken on Atauro island and in Manatuto Municipality, Timor-Leste. It is closely related to Wetarese and Galoli.

== Dialects ==
Atauran has three main dialects spoken on Atauro:

- Rasua in the sucos Beloi and Biqueli.
- Raklungu in the suco Macadade.
- Hresuk in the suco Maquili.

A fourth variety, Dadu'a, is spoken in Manatuto Municipality on the East Timorese mainland. It is somewhat divergent from the Atauro varieties and has undergone strong influence from Galoli.

== Adabe "language" ==
The Raklungu dialect of Atauran, or Kluʼun Hahan Adabe, was mistaken for a Papuan language by Antonio de Almeida (1966) and reported as "Adabe" in Wurm & Hattori (1981). Many subsequent sources propagated this error, showing a Papuan language on Atauro Island. (Note: The 2013 edition of Ethnologue, for example, showed "Adabe" being spoken on central Atauro, in the area of Raklungu, and lists the population of all three dialects of Atauran as being Papuan Adabe.) Geoffrey Hull, director of research for the Instituto Nacional de Linguística in East Timor, describes only Wetar varieties being spoken on Ataúro Island, and was unable to find any evidence of a non-Austronesian language there.
