= Idalaka language =

Language of Timor-Leste

Idalaka
- Region: Timor-Leste
- Native speakers: 17,000 (2010 census)
- Language family: Austronesian: Malayo-Polynesian; Central–Eastern; Timor–Babar; Ramelaic; Idalaka
- Dialects: Idaté; Isní; Lakalei; Lolein

Official status
- Recognised minority language in: Timor-Leste

Language codes
- ISO 639-3: Either: idt – Idaté lka – Lakalei
- Glottolog: east2733
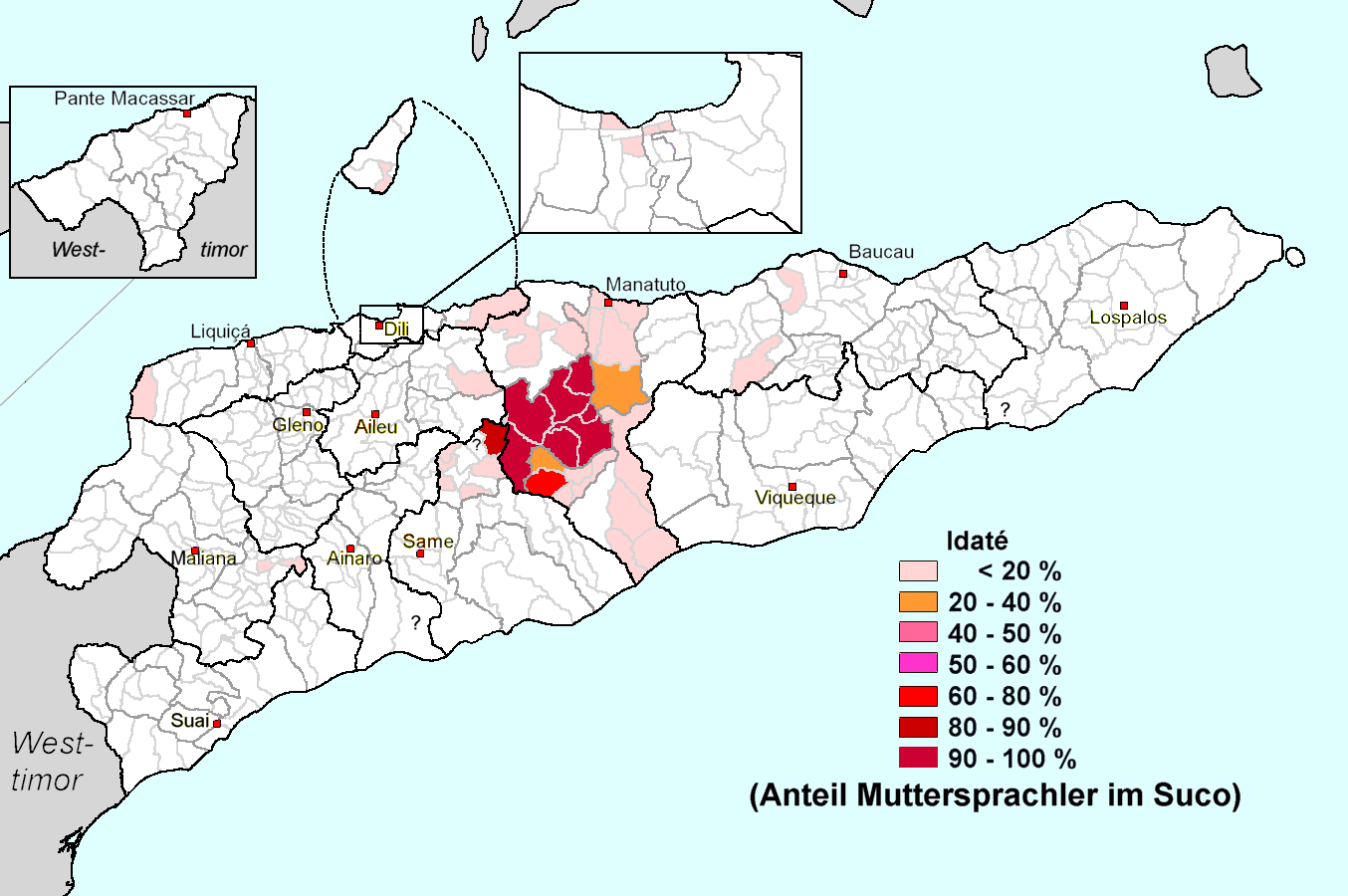
- Distribution of Idaté mother-tongue speakers in Timor-Leste

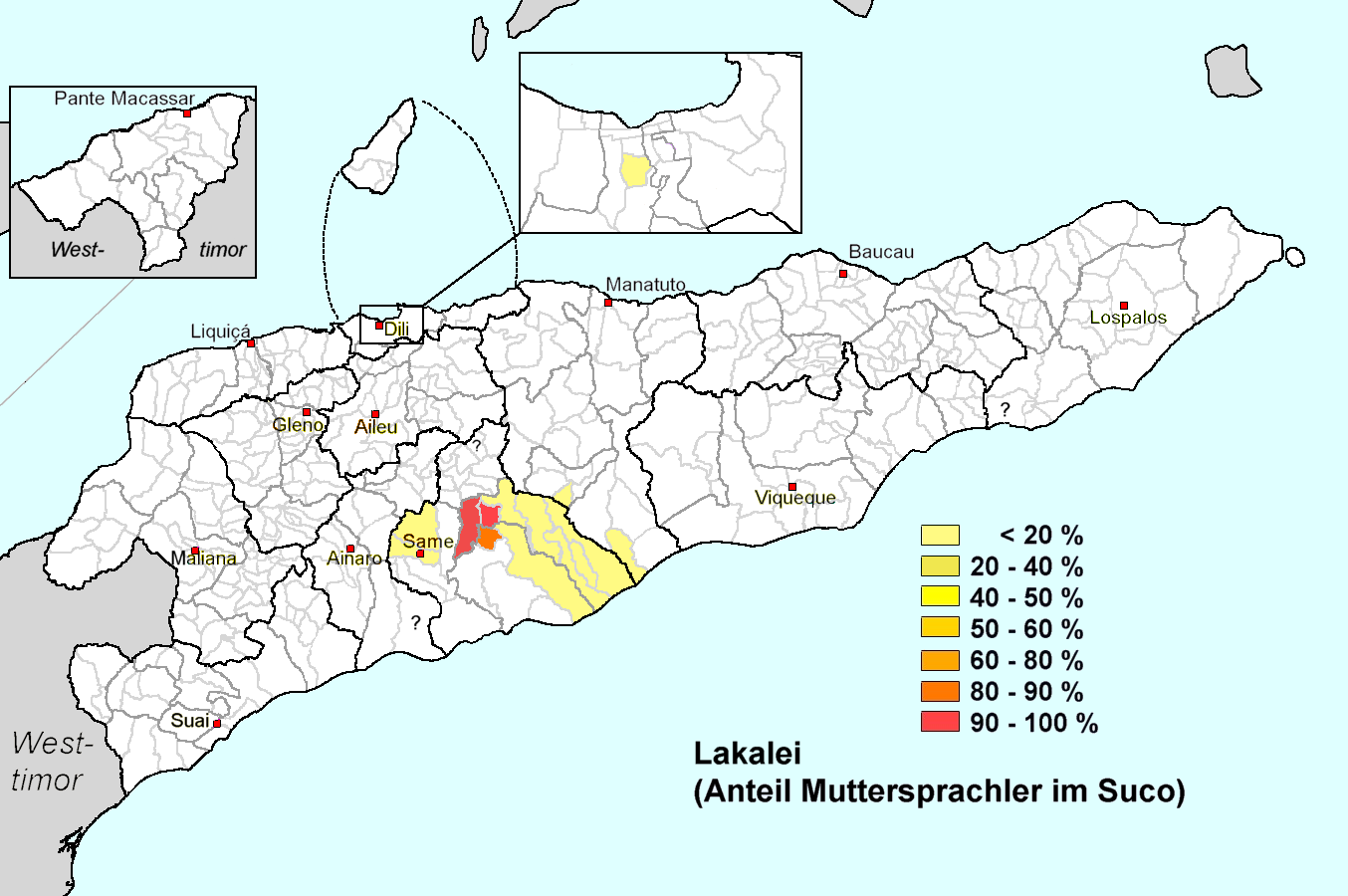
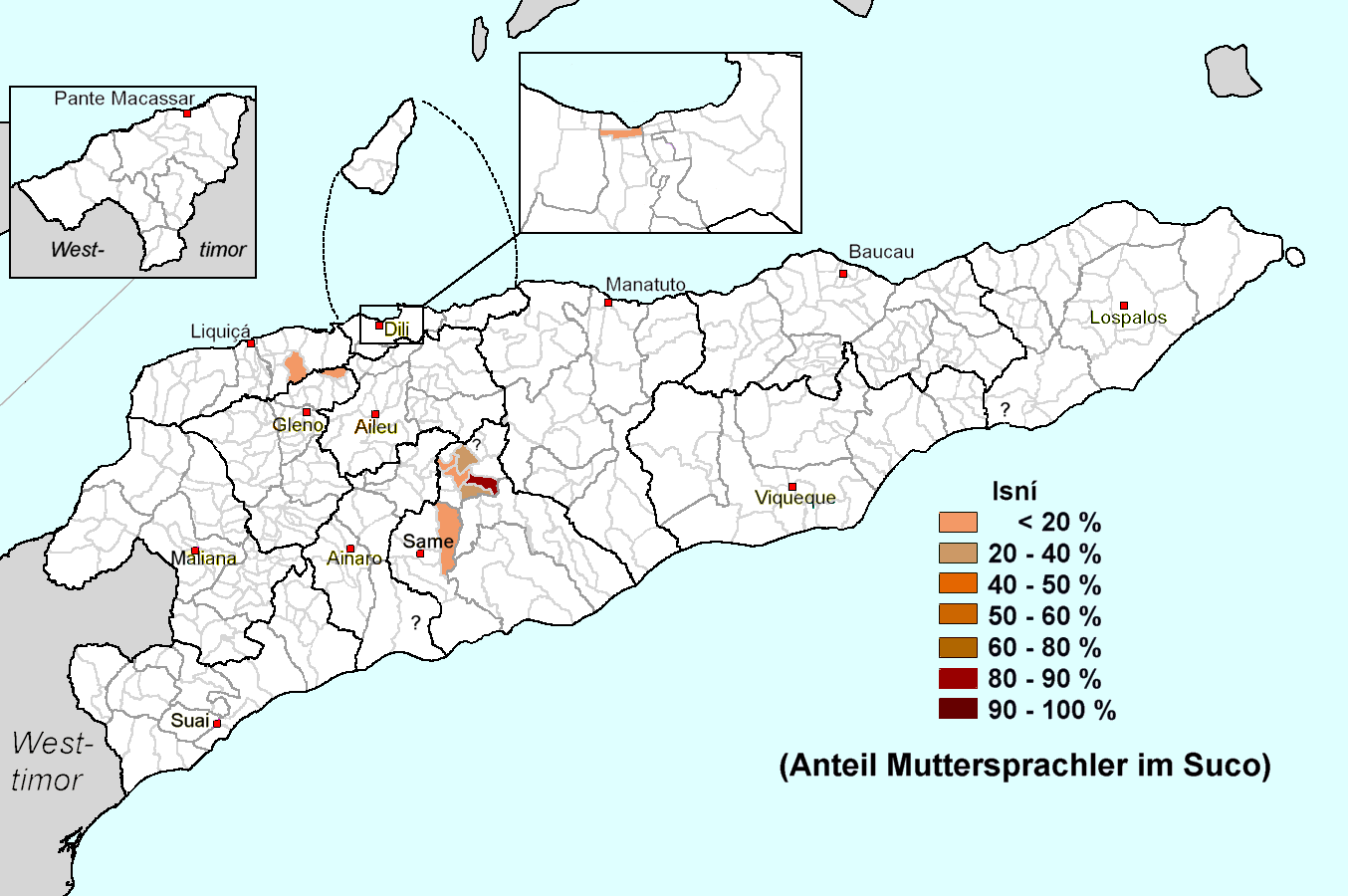
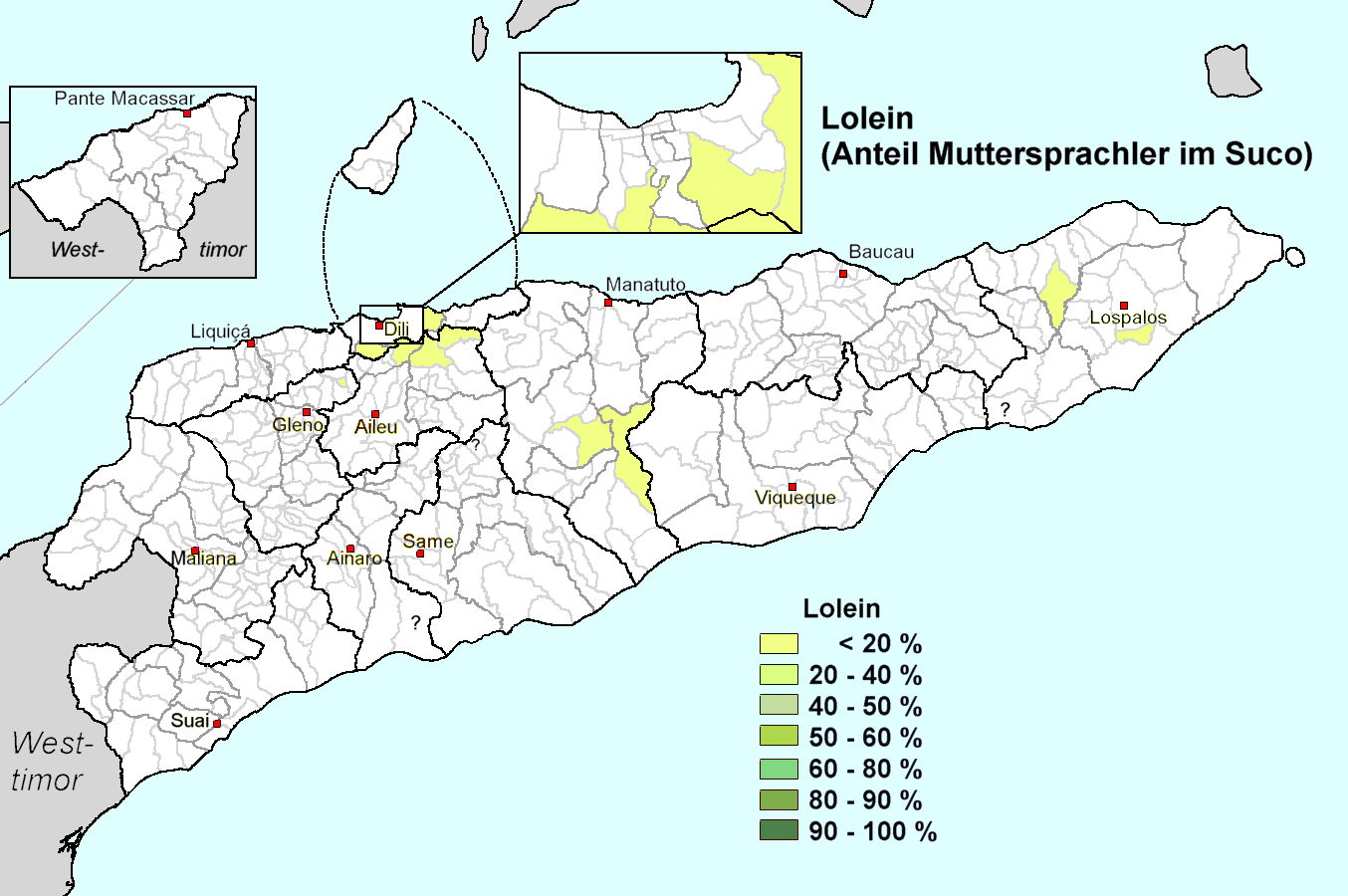
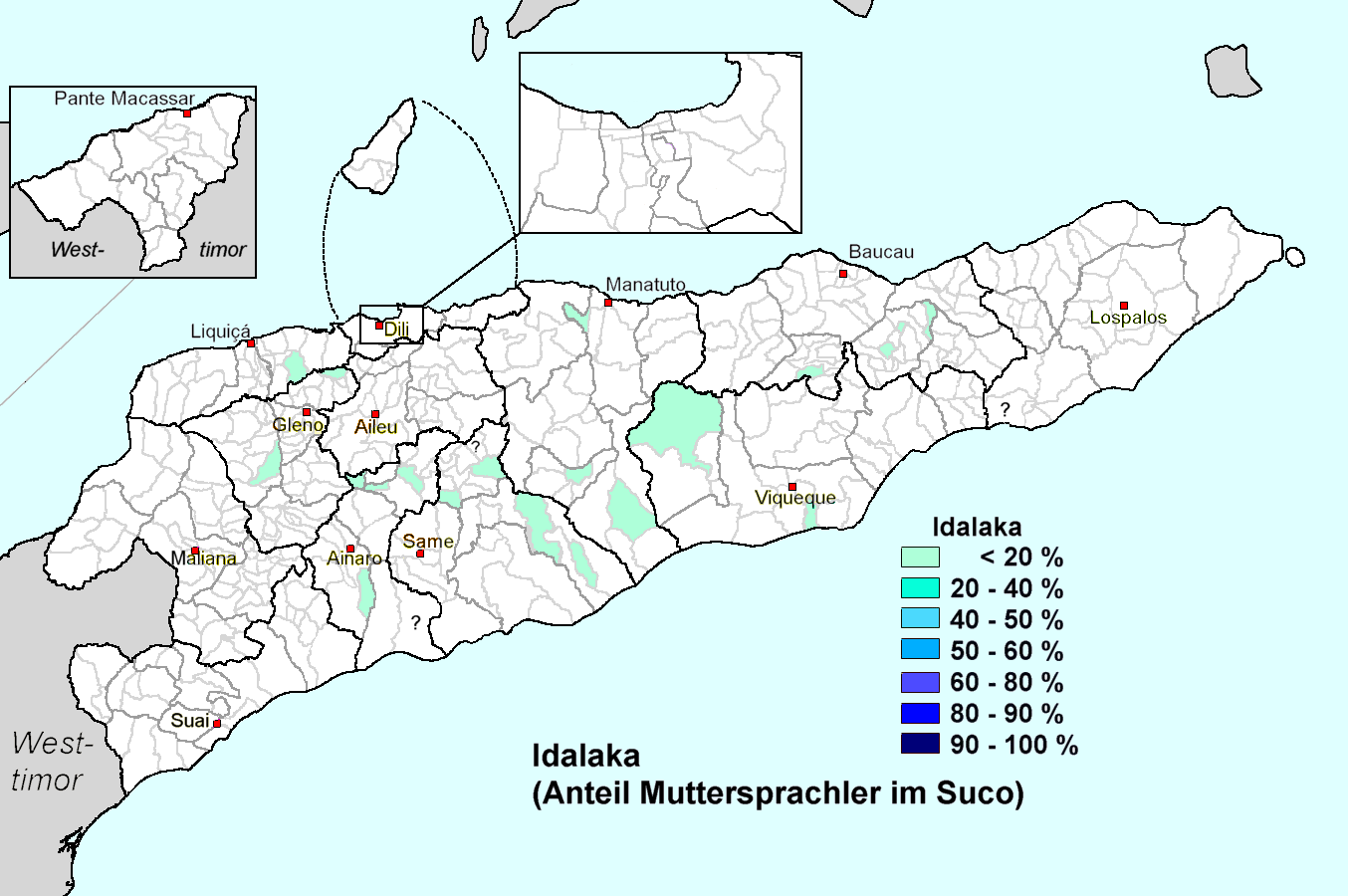
- Distribution of Lakalai Distribution of Isní Distribution of Lolein Distribution of Idalaka

Idalaka (Portuguese: Idalaca) is a Malayo-Polynesian dialect chain spoken Idalaka people in Timor-Leste. The name is a portmanteau of Idaté and Lakalai.

== Relation to other languages ==
The Idalaka dialects are closely related to Tetum and Habun, while they exhibit many similarities with Galoli. Idalaka also resembles the Kemak language in that there are archaic features such as personal prefixes in verbs, which are lost in Mambai and Tokodede.

== Geographic distribution ==
The dialects are spoken in the Ramelau mountains with the exception of endangered Lolein, which is spoken in Dili. The 2015 census recorded 19,913 people in Timor-Leste as native speakers of Idalaka dialects.

=== Official status ===
Idalaka is one of 15 recognized national languages of Timor-Leste.

== Dialects ==
Idaté (Idate) is the vernacular in Laclubar (Manatuto Municipality) and the bordering area in adjacent Manufahi. It has a total of 14,178 native speakers.

Lakalei is spoken in the area of Fahinehan (Manufahi). It has a total of 3,669 native speakers.

Isní is spoken east of Turiscai (Manufahi), with a total of 1,855 native speakers.

Lolein is spoken in Talitu (Aileu Municipality), Becora Leten and Hera (Dili Municipality). Lolein developed from the Isní of 19th century immigrants from Turiscai. In Dili municipality, 568 people speak Lolein, another 533 speakers live in the adjacent Alieu Municipality. A total of 1,155 people are native in the dialect across East Timor.

== Vocabulary ==
The basic numbers in the Idalaka dialects
Number	Lakalei	Isní	Lolein	Idaté
1	isa	is	isa	isa
2	rua	rua	rua	rua
3	telu	tel	telu	telu
4	aat	aat	aat	aat
5	lima	lim	lima	lima
6	neen	neen	neen	neen
7	hitu	hitu	hitu	hitu
8	ualu	ualu	ualu	ualu
9	sia	sia	sia	sia
10	sakulu	sakúl	sakulu	sanulu

== Bibliography ==
- Alcantara, Maressa Xavier (2014). Descrição fonética e fonológica da língua idaté do Timor Leste [Phonetic description and phonology of the idaté language of East Timor] (Master's thesis) (in Portuguese). University of São Paulo. doi:10.11606/d.8.2014.tde-11052015-171431.
