= Roti language =

Roti language may refer to:

- one of the Roti languages of Timor
- the Roti dialect of Indonesian Bajaw
