= Lole language =

Central Malayo-Polynesian language of Roti Island

Lole
- Lole–Ba'a, Central Rote
- Native to: Indonesia
- Region: Rote Island
- Ethnicity: Rotenese
- Native speakers: 20,000 (2002)
- Language family: Austronesian: Malayo-Polynesian; Central–Eastern; Timor–Babar; Rote–Meto; Nuclear Rote; Lole
- Dialects: Lole; Ba'a

Language codes
- ISO 639-3: llg
- Glottolog: lole1239
- ELP: Lole

Lole and Ba'a are a Central Malayo-Polynesian language of Roti Island, off Timor, Indonesia.
