= Wetar bow-fingered gecko =

Conservation status
- Least Concern (IUCN 3.1)

Scientific classification
- Kingdom: Animalia
- Phylum: Chordata
- Order: Squamata
- Suborder: Gekkota
- Family: Gekkonidae
- Genus: Cyrtodactylus
- Species: C. wetariensis

Binomial name
- Cyrtodactylus wetariensis (Dunn, 1927)
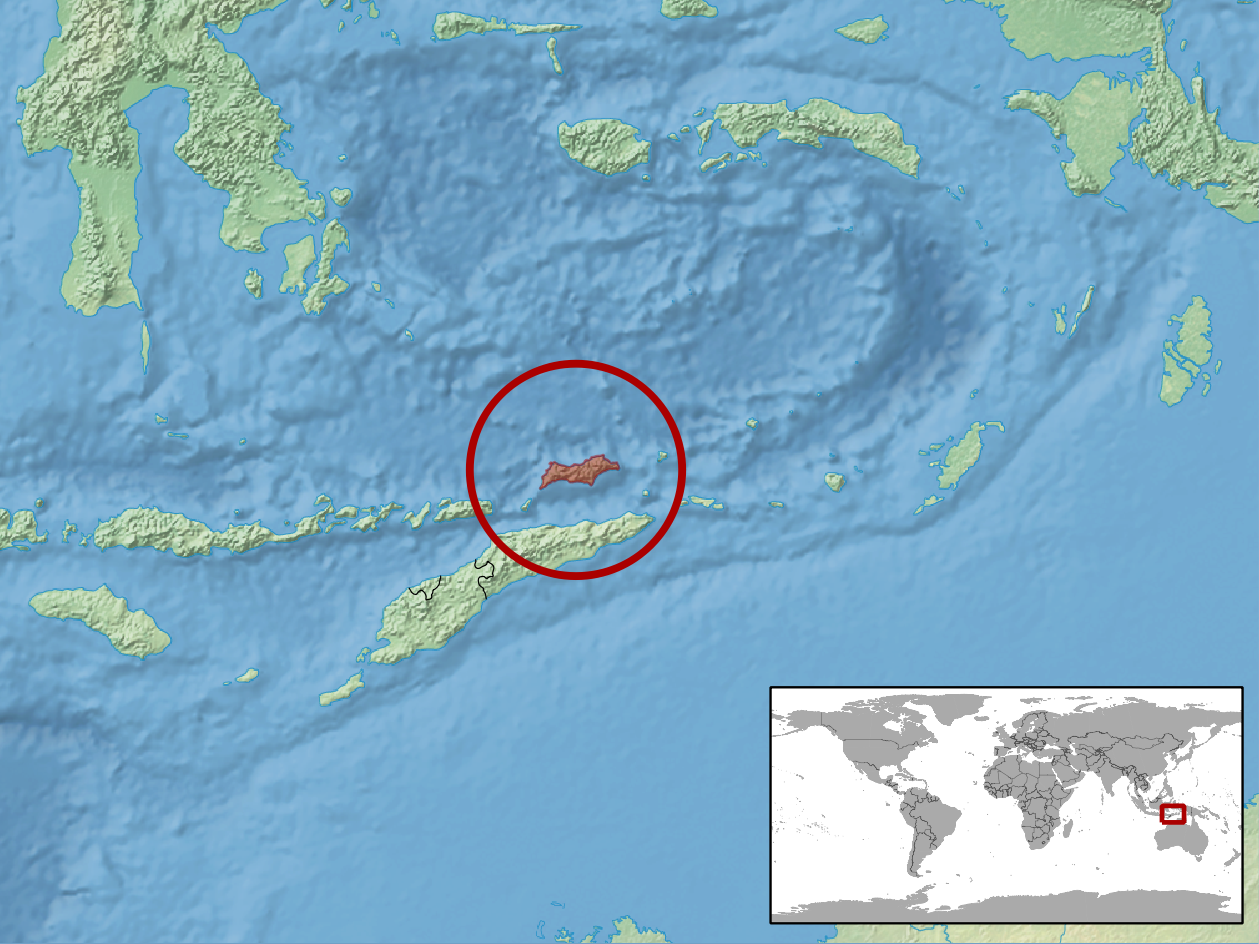

Synonyms
- Gymnodactylus wetariensis

Species of lizard

The Wetar bow-fingered gecko (Cyrtodactylus wetariensis) is a species of gecko that is endemic to Wetar in Indonesia.
