= Tii language =

Language spoken in Indonesia

Tii
- Western Rote
- Native to: Indonesia
- Region: Rote Island
- Ethnicity: Rotenese
- Native speakers: 20,000 (2002)
- Language family: Austronesian: Malayo-Polynesian; Central–Eastern; Timor–Babar; Rote–Meto; Nuclear Rote; Tii

Language codes
- ISO 639-3: txq
- Glottolog: tiii1241
- ELP: Tii

Tii is a Central Malayo-Polynesian language of Roti Island, off Timor, Indonesia.
