= Termanu language =

Language spoken in Indonesia

Termanu
- Pa'da
- Central Rote
- Native to: Indonesia
- Region: Rote Island
- Ethnicity: Rotenese
- Native speakers: 30,000 (2002)
- Language family: Austronesian: Malayo-Polynesian; Central–Eastern; Timor–Babar; Rote–Meto; Nuclear Rote; Termanu
- Dialects: Termanu; South Termanu; Korbafo; Bokai

Language codes
- ISO 639-3: twu
- Glottolog: term1237

Termanu is a Central Malayo-Polynesian language of Roti Island, off Timor, Indonesia. Speakers of Korbafo and Bokai dialects are ethnically distinct.

== Phonology ==
=== Consonants ===
		Labial	Apical	Velar	Glottal
Nasal		m	n	ŋ	
Stop	voiceless	p	t	k	ʔ
Stop	voiced	b	d̪		
Stop	prenasal	ᵐp ᵐb	ⁿd	ᵑɡ	
Fricative		f	s		h
Lateral			l		

- /ᵑɡ, l/ have variants of [ɡ, ɾ] in other dialects.
- Sounds [w, j] also occur in loanwords and interjections.

=== Vowels ===
	Front	Central	Back
High	i		u
Mid	e		o
Low		a	

Vowel length is also distributed.

== Sources ==
- Fanggidaej, J. (1892). "Rottineesche Spraakkunst". Bijdragen voor de Taal-, Land- en Volkenkunde van Nederlandsch Indië (in Dutch). 41: 554–571. doi:10.1163/22134379-90000187.
- Jonker, J. C. G. (1908). Rottineesch–Hollandsch Woordenboek (in Dutch). Leiden: E. J. Brill – via archive.org.
- Jonker, J. C. G. (1915). Rottineesche Spraakkunst (in Dutch). Leiden: E. J. Brill.
