= Te'un =

Te'un may be,

- Te'un Island
- Te'un language
