= Bilba =

Bilba may be:

- Bilba language
- Jim Bilba
- Bilba Labingi, the real Westron form of the name of the fictional character Bilbo Baggins
