= Rotenese people =

Ethnic group in Indonesia

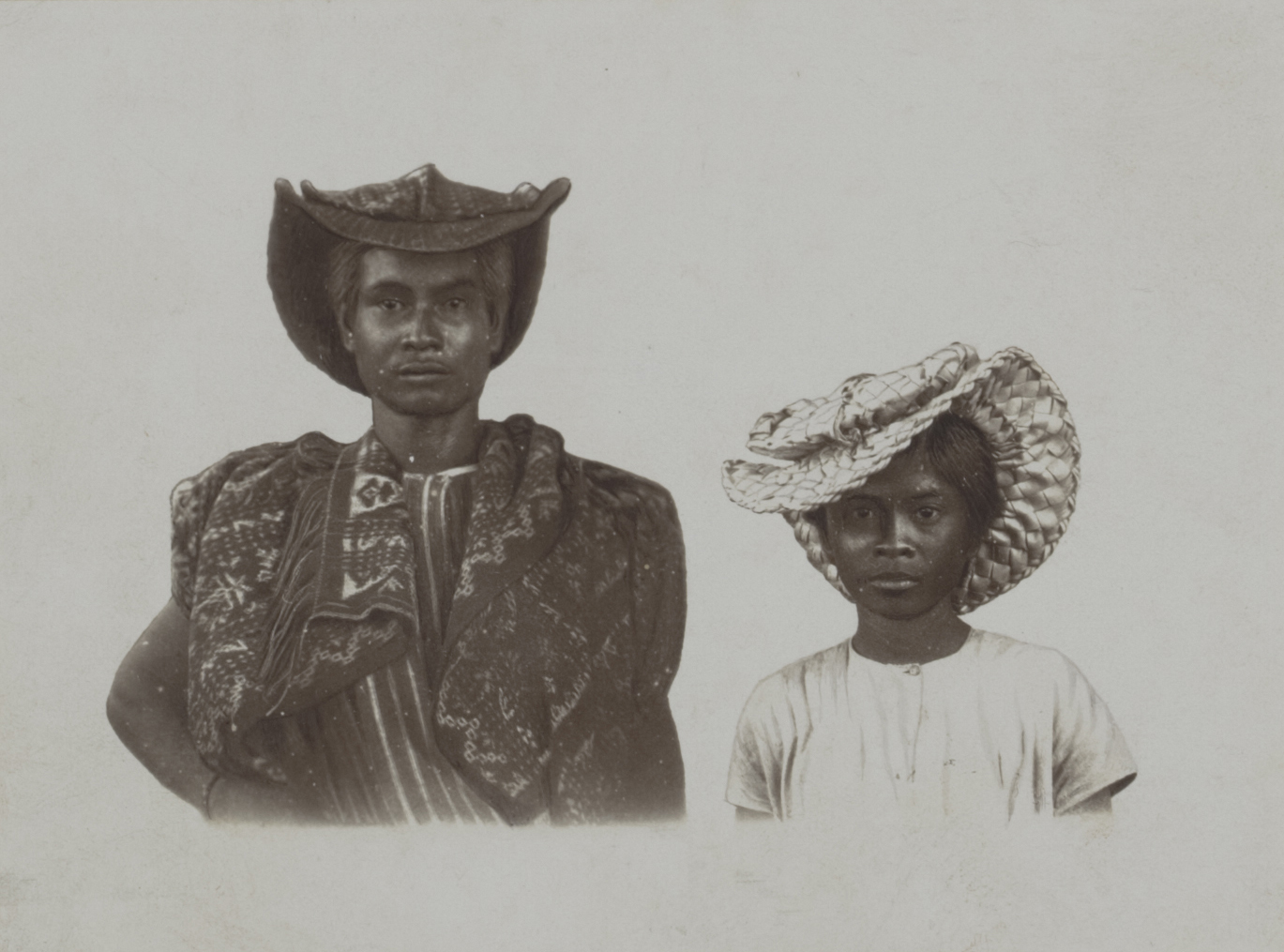
- The two Rotenese people wear elegantly woven straw hats, characteristic of the island, c. 1899–1900.

Regions with significant populations
- Indonesia (Rote Island and West Timor)

Languages
- Rotenese languages, Kupang Malay, and Indonesian

Religion
- Christianity, folk religion, and Islam

Related ethnic groups
- Atoni • Helong • Dhao

The Rotenese people are one of the native inhabitants of Rote Island, while part of them reside in West Timor. Apart from that, the Rotenese people also settled in islands surrounding Rote Island, such as Ndao (with the Dhao), Nuse, Pamana, Doo, Heliana, Landu, Manuk, and other smaller islands. There are some who believed that the Rotenese people originally migrated from Seram Island, Maluku. They were thought to have arrived on the Rote Island during the reign of the Majapahit kingdom in the late 13th–16th century. It was during this time that there were references to the rulers of the Rotenese people. Initially, the Rotenese people founded settlements on the island of Timor, where they engaged in manual slash-and-burn farming and used irrigation system.

== Language ==
The Rotenese language is part of the Austronesian languages, from the Southwest Malayo-Polynesian languages, which are made up of several dialects. The main dialects are Lole (Loleh), Ringgou, Termanu, Bilba, Dengka, Tii (Thie), Oenale, and Dela (Delha).

== Livelihood ==
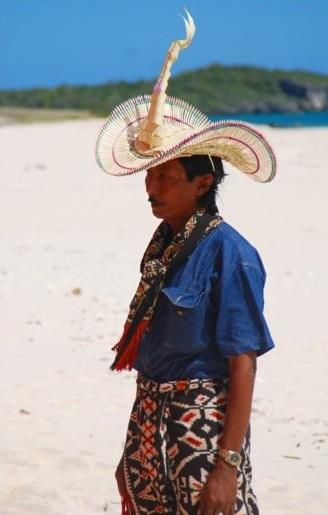
The Raja of West Rote on Dana island.

The livelihood of the Rotenese people includes agriculture, animal farming, fishing, tapping Neera and palm crafting. Lands that are well irrigated are used as paddy fields or water catchments. The main farming produce are rice, corn, cassava, sorghum, millet, as well as other commodities like pepper, peanuts, vegetables and coffee; while the main animal farming are buffaloes, cattle, horses and poultry. Rotenese women work on traditional weaving handicrafts, woven Pandan leaves, pottery and so on. Small trades are also common.

== Diet ==
The most common diet of the Rotenese people are from tubers, porridge, and fish with spicy seasonings.

== Social structure ==
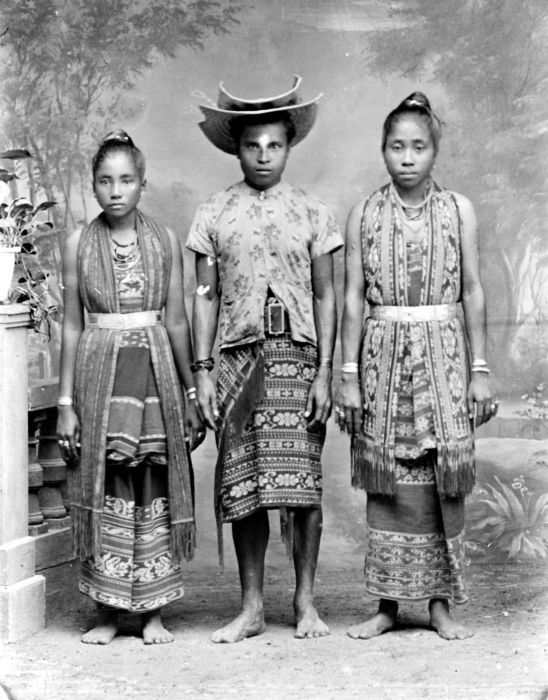
A portrait of a Rotenese man with his women in full regalia.

The kinship system of this people are nucleus family kinship or broad family with patriarchalistic in character, and also maintains an exogamy clan marriage customs. The formation of large families consist of the smaller clans called nggi leo; which in turn the formation of these smaller clans make up of the larger clans called leo.

== Religion ==
The traditional beliefs of the Rotenese people center on a creator known as Lamatuan or Lamatuak. This deity that is regarded as a creator, predestinator, and the one who blesses, is symbolized by a three-branched pillar. Today, most Rotenese people practice Protestant Christianity, Catholic Christianity, or Islam.

== Culture ==
Traditional Rotenese clothing is a kain (a cloth of up to 2.5 meters long, wrapped around the waist, reaching to the knees or ankles), as well as jackets and shirts, with a specific style of a straw hat called ti'i langga. A typical family is small and based on patrilocal marriage; where the wife resides in the community of her husband.
