= Kje (disambiguation) =

Kje is a Cyrillic letter.

Kje or KJE could also refer to:

- Kisar language, Central Malayo-Polynesian language of Indonesia
- Kje (dialect), Piedmontese dialect
- Kranji Expressway, in Singapore
- Kruijenite, a mineral; see List of mineral symbols
