= Dengka language =

Language in Indonesia

Dengka
- Western Rote
- Native to: Indonesia
- Region: Rote Island
- Ethnicity: Rotenese
- Native speakers: 20,000 (2002)
- Language family: Austronesian: Malayo-Polynesian; Central–Eastern; Timoric; Timor–Babar; Rote–Meto; West Rote; Dengka
- Dialects: Western Dengka; Eastern Dengka; Lelain

Language codes
- ISO 639-3: dnk
- Glottolog: deng1253

Dengka is a Central Malayo-Polynesian language of Roti Island, off Timor, Indonesia.
