= Luang =

Luang may refer to:

- Luang (title), a Thai noble title
- Luang language, a language that is spoken on the islands Luang, Wetang, Moa and Lakor
- Luang Prabang, a city and former royal capital located in north central Laos
