= Galole =

Galole may refer to:

- Galole language, spoken in East Timor
- Hola, Kenya, a town also known as Galole
