= Leti language =

Austronesian language spoken in Maluku, Indonesia

Leti
- Native to: Indonesia
- Region: Leti Islands
- Native speakers: (7,500 cited 1995)
- Language family: Austronesian: Malayo-Polynesian (MP); Central–Eastern MP; Timoric; South–East Timor; Luangic–Kisaric; Luangic; Leti

Language codes
- ISO 639-3: lti
- Glottolog: leti1246

Leti (or Letti) is an Austronesian language spoken on the island of Leti in Maluku, Indonesia. Although it shares much vocabulary with the neighboring Luang language, it is marginally mutually intelligible.

Fewer than 1% of Leti speakers are literate in Leti, though between 25% and 50% of them are literate in another language.

== Varieties ==
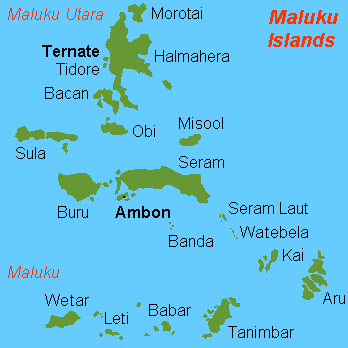
Map of Maluku archipelago. Leti is located in southwestern part of the archipelago.

The main dialectological division in Leti is between eastern varieties, spoken in the domains of Laitutun and Luhuleli, and western varieties, spoken in the domains of Batumiau, Tutukei, Tomra, and Nuwewang. This article focusses on the Tutukei variety and is based on a descriptive study by Aone van Engelenhoven (2004), a Dutch linguist of Leti descent. Tutukei itself divides into two sociolects, lirlèta i.e. 'village language' (lira 'language', lèta '(walled) village'), and lirkòta i.e. 'city language' (lira 'language', kòta 'city').

Leti also has two literary or ritual varieties, lirmarna ('royal language') and lirasnïara ('sung language'). Both of them prominently feature lexical parallelism.

Per van Engelenhoven 2004, "the major issue in formal Leti discourse is to keep speaking as long as possible. Indeed, the important element in 'royal speech' is not what is said, but rather how it is said and how long it takes to be said". In particular lirmarna features formulaic pairs of clauses which are syntactically identical, each pair of corresponding words in the two clauses forming a lexical pair.

Lirasnïara is the sung form of lirmarna. It employs a repertoire of approximately 150 Luangic-Kisaric words with distinctive sound changes: e.g. /βuna/ 'flower' and /tutu/ 'point' are /βɔe/ and /kukie/ in lirasniara. Often borrowings from Malay are inserted as well. Again per van Engelenhoven 2004, "in Southwest Malukan society turn-taking in singing is ritualized and as such a fixed strategy, which makes it a powerful rhetoric device in Leti discourse. [...] [A] song may not be interrupted when performed. Singing is thus a means to prevent interruption in a speech event or an instrument to surpass the other speech participants".

== Phonology ==
=== Consonants ===
	Bilabial	Dental	Alveolar	Velar
Nasal	m	n		
Plosive	p	t	d	k
Fricative	β (v)	s		
Lateral			l	
Trill			r	

In addition, the phonemes /b/, /c/, /ɡ/, /ŋ/, and /h/ occur only in loans, mostly from Indonesian, Tetum, and the local variety of Malay.

=== Vowels ===
	Front	Central	Back
Close	i		u
Close-mid	e		o
Open-mid	ɛ (è)		ɔ (ò)
Open		a	

These vowels can also occur long; the phonemic status of long vowels hangs on the interpretation of Leti's pervasive metathetic processes.

The mid vowels /e, o, ɛ, ɔ/ are restricted to the penult of lexical morphemes, which is stressed. The majority of these morphemes provide no evidence for the height contrast — /ɛ, ɔ/ are found before an ultimate /a/ and /e, o/ in other positions — and diachronically there was no contrast. However, the contrast is set up synchronically on account of certain exceptions (/ea/ 'he, she', /msena/ 'refuse', /dena/ 'stay'), and the fact that when suffixed the conditioning vowel can disappear:

/kɛrna/ 'dry' → /ŋkɛrnulu/ 'it dries first'
/kernu/ 'descend' → /ŋkernulu/ 'he descends first'

=== Phonological processes ===
Metathesis and apocope, together binding processes, are pervasive in Leti as a feature of combinations of morphemes. The preferred "flow of speech" in Leti seems to involve chains of CCV units.

The free form of any Leti morpheme always features a final vowel, so those whose bound forms end in consonants feature two allomorphs which are related by CV metathesis. Thus 'skin, fly (n.), fish, bird' have bound forms /ulit, llaran, iina, maanu/ (the latter two with long vowels) but free forms /ulti, llarna, ian, maun/.

When a morpheme whose bound form ends in a vowel is prefixed to another component, that final vowel may apocopate or metathesise into the following component. CV metathesis happens when the metathesising vowel is high and is followed by at most one consonant and a non-high vowel. The metathesised vowel is realised as a glide, [j w] written as ï ü. Thus sivi + ternu 'chicken + egg' becomes sivtïernu 'chicken egg', au + laa 1st sing. pronoun + 'go' becomes alüaa 'I go'. In other contexts apocope happens, unless this would leave an illicit three-consonant cluster. So sivi + ruri 'chicken + bone' becomes sivruri 'chicken bone', kusa + nama 'cat + tongue' becomes kusnama 'cat's tongue'.

A similar metathesis is found with the nominaliser, historically an infix -in-, but now taking the form -nï- among many other allomorphs (detailed more below): thus sora 'sew' derives snïora 'needle'.

== Grammar ==
=== Morphology ===
Human nouns pluralise with the third person plural pronominal clitic -ra, which must follow another suffixed element: püata 'woman', püat=e 'the woman', püat=e=ra 'the women'. Nonhuman nouns pluralise by repetition: kuda 'horse', kuda kuda 'horses'.

Leti has both spatial as temporal deixis. Spatial deixis has three degrees and is marked by clitics as in these examples:

püat-dï-ra
woman-here-PL
"The woman here (next to me)"

püat-dó-ra
woman-there-PL
"The woman there (a little further away)"

püat-dé-ra
woman-over.there-PL
"The woman there (in the distance)"

Temporal deixis has four degrees:

müan-di-ra
man-now-PL
"The men we discuss now"

müan-dio-ra
man-then-PL
"The men we discussed then"

müan-die-ra
man-once-PL
"The men we discussed once"

müan-da
man-once.before
"The man/men we discussed once / that were mentioned before"

Deixis clitics can be stacked:

püat-dé-de
woman-there-once
"That woman over there we discussed once"

müan-dí-di
man-over.there-now
"The man/men we discussed once / that were mentioned before"

Leti has four possessive suffixes, which undergo binding.

	Singular	Plural
1st	-ku	-nV
2nd	-mu	-mi
3rd	-nV	

The vowel V in the first person plural and third person suffix copies the last vowel of its base.

Nouns can be zero-derived to verbs: e.g. rita 'roof' → na-rita 'he roofs' or 'it has a roof'.

Nominal compounding is highly productive as a derivational process. For example rai + lavna 'king' + 'big' → ralïavna 'emperor', pipi + ïadmu 'goat' + 'shed' → pipïadmu 'goat shed', vutu + müani 'ribbon' + 'man' → vutumüani 'man's ribbon', vika + papa 'buttocks' + 'cucumber' → vikpapa 'cockroach', kapla + nèma reduplicated 'ship' + 'fly' → kapalnèmnèma 'airplane'.

Verbs fall into two classes according to whether their subject prefixes exhibit binding or not: those of Class I do not, those of Class II do. By default verbs are in Class II. Certain verbs are lexically in Class I (like nòa 'advise'), together with all verbs with complex onsets (ssòrna 'cough') and denominal or causativised verbs (veli 'buy', from the noun veli 'price'). The subject prefixes are as follows.

	Singular	Plural
1st exclusive	u-	ma-
1st inclusive		ta-
2nd	mu-	mi-
3rd	na-	ra-
relative	ka-	

Verbs with first person singular inflection necessarily take the pronoun a= 'I' as a proclitic.

Some causatives are marked only by class change: pali means 'float' in class II and 'make float' in class I.

The nominalising affix productively derives nouns from verbs. It takes various forms, most of which are infixes, depending on the phonological shape and the class of its base.

Form	Example	Class	Conditions
nïa-	na-ltïeri 'he speaks' → nïaltïeri 'speaking'	I	general
i- + -ï-	na-nòa 'he advises' → inïòa 'advising'	I	only three verbs, all starting in n
ï-	n-odi 'he carries' → ïodi 'load, carrying-pole'	II	vowel-initial
nï-	n-odi 'he carries' → nïodi 'act of carrying'	II	vowel-initial, nominalises the act when ï- yields an instrument sense
-nï-	m-pali 'it floats' → pnïali 'floating'	II	non-nasal non-alveolar initial consonant
-n-	m-pupnu 'he shuts' → pnupnu 'shutting'	II	form of -nï- before high vowels
-ï-	n-mai 'he comes' → mïai 'arrival'	II	nasal or alveolar initial consonant

Reduplication, which usually copies a root-initial CV or CVCV sequence with binding, has a variety of functions, among them adjectivisation of nouns (üau 'idiot' → üa-üau 'idiotic') and verbs (mèra 'redden' → mèr-mèra), derivation of nouns, especially instruments (sòra 'sew' → sòr-sòra 'needle'), marking atelicity, and relativising on an object (n-vèèta 'he pulls' → (n-)vèvèèta 'which he pulls').

== Vocabulary ==
=== Lexical parallelism ===
Many of Leti's lexical items are organised into lexical pairs, which are always deployed as fixed combinations in a fixed order. A few pairs involve adjectives or numerals, but the vast majority consist of nouns (e.g. püata // müani 'woman // man', üèra // vatu 'water // stone') or verbs (e.g. kili // toli 'look // see', keri // kòi 'scratch / scrape').

Some words are confined to lexical pairs, such as tirka in tirka // llena 'lightning', or both dupla and mavla in dupla // mavla 'witchcraft'; these pairs are restricted to lirmarna. In lirmarna the function of lexical pairs is to highlight particular elements of a sentence, or simply to mark formality. When used in ordinary speech, the meanings of lexical pairs can relate in various ways to those of their components:

leli // masa 'ivory // gold', meaning 'treasure'
lòi // spou 'proa // sailing boat', meaning 'traditional fleet'
nusa // rai 'island // mainland', meaning 'archipelago'
ili // vatu 'hill // stone', meaning 'fort'
püata // müani 'woman // man', meaning either 'married couple' or 'gender'

Or they can simply have the sense of a conjunction, e.g. asu // vavi 'dog // pig' = 'the dog and the pig'; these are the only sort of conjoined phrases that do not require the conjunction na.

== History ==
The phones of Luangic-Kisaric continue those of Proto-Malayo-Polynesian according to the following sound changes (based on Mills 2010). In Western Leti, LK */ʔ/ has vanished and LK */a/ from MP *e is manifested as /o/. In Eastern Leti, LK */s/ becomes /h/ and LK */u/ becomes /ɔ/ in the penult before a low vowel.

Proto-Malayo-Polynesian	Luangic-Kisaric
*m	*m
*n, *ɲ, *ŋ	*n
*t, *Z	*t
*k	*ʔ
*g	*k
*b	*β
*z, *d, *D, *R, *r, *j	*r
*l	*l, *n
*s	*s
*w	*w
*h, *q, *p, *y	0
*i, *uy, *ey, *ay	*i
*u	*u
*e	*e, *a
*a, *aw	*a

Roger Mills suggests that Luangic-Kisaric retained distinct reflexes of PMP *ŋ, on the basis of other languages in the family, and *Z. Moreover, although the status of *Z as a PMP phoneme is unclear — Mills along with John U. Wolff and Robert Blust no longer admit it, realigning it with *z — the Luangic languages have no clear examples of inherited *z, despite numerous examples of *Z > /t/.

Mills explains the metathesis found in consonant-final basis as arising from an original echo vowel added to consonant-final forms, e.g. *kúlit 'skin' > kúliti, after which the original post-tonic vowel was deleted, e.g. yielding kúlti > Leti ulti.

Jonker (1932) was the first full-scale investigation of Leti, based on a native informant and the few 19th-century works on the language then available.

== Examples ==
The following paragraph is the opening of the Sailfish story as told by Upa S. Manina of Talvunu // Resïara house in the Ilwiaru quarters in Tutukei and reproduced in van Engelenhoven (2004). The Sailfish story is of great importance to Leti society: it provides an origin story for the Leti 'boat owner clans' of Luang origin, describing the destruction of the mythical former Luang continent and the migrations that brought its inhabitants to Leti.

Leti

1. Ululude müani ida mpatròme püata idalo Lïòno.
2. Apo rasaamme.
3. Rasaappo raorïaambo ira aanne ria vòruo.
4. Kòkkòi müani vòrupo nïaulu nvava Retïelüai, üari nvava Sairmòraso.
5. Apo kòkkòi rmapo rapninmüaato.
6. Ne rakkusalkaitmaato.
7. Ne inne nmatio.

Translation:

English

1. In olden times a man begot a woman on Luang.
2. So they married.
3. They married and begot two children.
4. It was two boys and the firstborn was named Retieluai, the youngest was named Sairmoras.
5. So the children did not know anything yet.
6. They were still very little.
7. And their mother died.
