= Uab Meto language =

Austronesian language spoken in West Timor

Uab Meto
- Uab Metô
- Native to: Indonesia, Timor-Leste
- Region: West Timor, Oecusse
- Native speakers: 800,000 (2009–2011)
- Language family: Austronesian: Malayo-Polynesian; Central–Eastern?; Central?; Timoric; Rote–Meto; West Rote–Meto; Meto–Amarasi; Uab Meto

Official status
- Recognised minority language in: East Timor

Language codes
- ISO 639-3: Either: aoz – Uab Meto bkx – Baikeno
- Glottolog: uabm1237
- ELP: Uab Meto
- Baikeno
- Map of the Meto language cluster according to Edwards (2020)

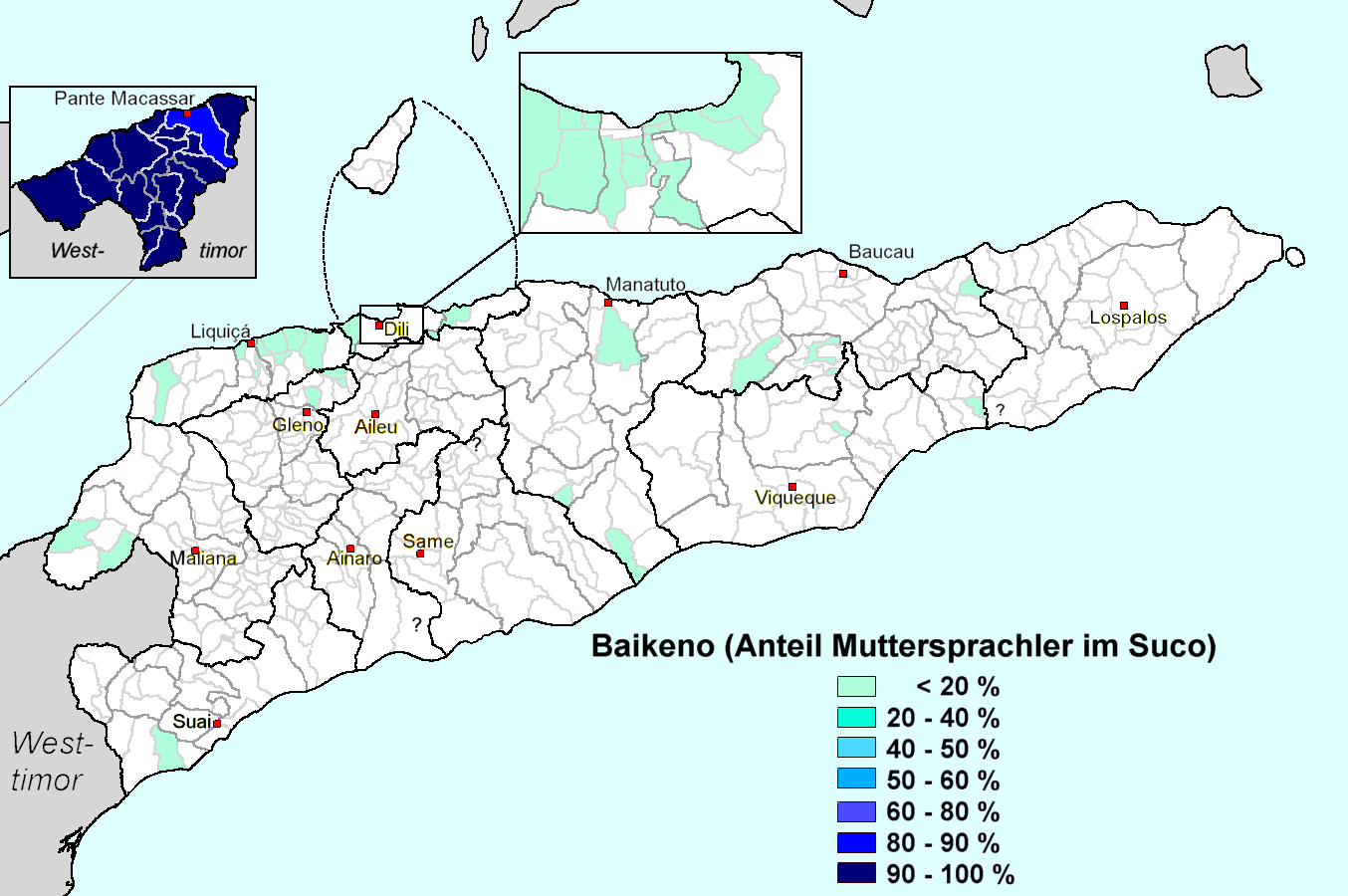
Percentage of people using Baikeno as mother tongue in Timor-Leste, according census 2010

Uab Meto or Dawan is an Austronesian language cluster spoken by the Atoni people of the Indonesian region of West Timor, as well as the East Timorese municipality of Oecussi-Ambeno.

In Timor-Leste and other Portuguese-speaking countries the language is often called Baikenu (Portuguese: baiqueno), but more narrowly this term refers only to the variety spoken in East Timor, which is more influenced by Portuguese rather than Indonesian (for example, using obrigadu for 'thank you', instead of the Indonesian terima kasih). In other languages it may also be erroneously referred to as West Timorese (with Tetum being "East Timorese") or even just Timorese, but these terms are misleading, as they ignore the linguistic diversity on both sides of the island.

== Phonology ==
Dawan has the following consonants and vowels:

Consonant sounds
		Labial	Alveolar	Velar	Glottal
Plosive	voiceless	p	t	k	ʔ
Plosive	voiced	b			
Nasal		m	n		
Fricative		f	s		h
Lateral			l		

Voiceless plosives [p t k] can have unreleased allophones [p̚ t̚ k̚] in word-final position. A phonemic /r/ can be heard in place of /l/ among dialects.

Vowel sounds
	Front	Back
High	i	u
Mid	e	o
Mid	ɛ	ɔ
Low	a	

== Vocabulary ==
A wordlist of 200 basic vocabulary items is available at the Austronesian Basic Vocabulary Database, with data provided by Robert Blust and from Edwards (2016).

Basic Uab Meto vocabulary
Uab Meto	English
Pah (polite), Tua (polite), Hao (normal), He' (informal), Ya (normal)	Yes
Kaha', Kahfa'	No
Nek seun banit (in West Timor)	Thank you
Obrigadu (in East Timor)	Thank you
Nek seunbanit namfau/´naek', Terimakasih 'nanaek (in West Timor)	Thank you very much
Obrigadu namfau' (in East Timor)	Thank you very much
Sama-sama, leko, naleok	You are welcome
Neu'	Please
Maaf, permisi, parmis	Excuse me
Halo, Tabe	Hello
Tkoenok tem pa´	Welcome, please come in
Tkoenok pa´ (to say good bye to one who leaves)	Good bye
Selamat tinggal (said to one staying)	Good bye
Selamat Jalan (said to one leaving)	Good bye

== Numbers ==
Numbers
Uab Meto	English
Nol, Luman	Zero
Mese'	One
Nua	Two
Teun	Three
Haa	Four
Niim	Five
Nee	Six
Hiut	Seven
Faun, Faon	Eight
Sio	Nine
Bo'-, Bo'es	Ten
Bo'es-am-mese'	Eleven
Bo'es-am-nua	Twelve
Bo'es-am-teun	Thirteen
Bo'es-am-haa	Fourteen
Bo'es-am-niim	Fifteen
Bo'es-am-nee	Sixteen
Bo'es-am-hiut	Seventeen
Bo'es-am-faun	Eighteen
Bo'es-am-sio	Nineteen
Bo'nua	Twenty
Bo'nua-m-mese'	Twenty-one
Bo'teun	Thirty
Bo'haa	Forty
Bo'niim	Fifty
Bo'nee	Sixty
Bo'hiut	Seventy
Bo'faun	Eighty
Bo'sio	Ninety
Natun mese', Nautnes	One hundred
Nifun mese', Niufnes	One thousand
Juta mese', Juta es, Juutes	One million

== See also ==
- Languages of Indonesia
- Languages of Timor-Leste
