= Liran =

Island in Maluku, Indonesia

Coordinates: 8.01028°S 125.733°E

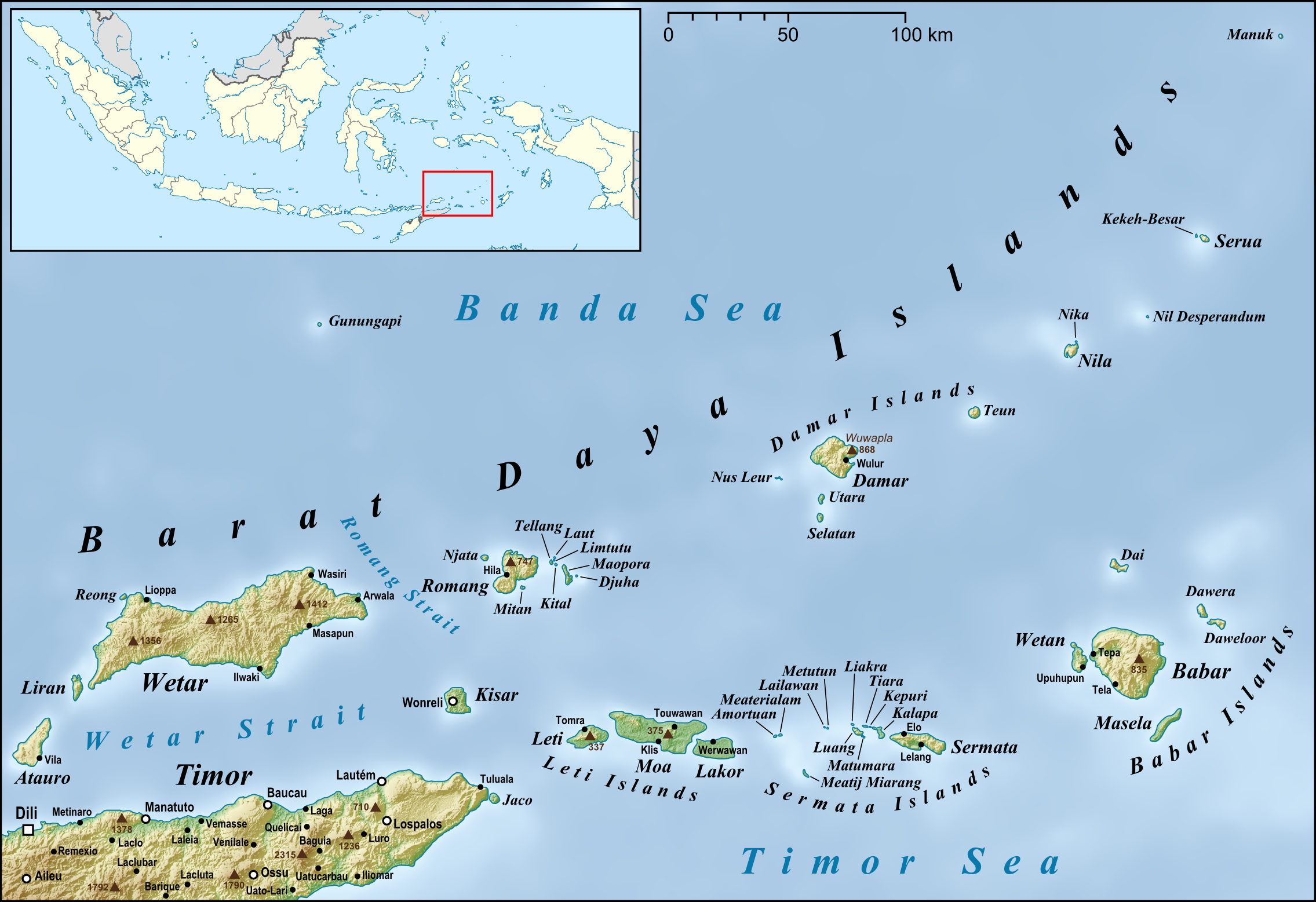
- Map of the Barat Daya Islands with Liran in the far west

Geography
- Location: Southeast Asia

Administration
- Indonesia
- Province: Maluku
- Regency: Southwest Maluku

Demographics
- Languages: Indonesian, Wetarese

Additional information
- Time zone: IEST (UTC+09:00)

Liran (Indonesian: Pulau Liran, Indonesian pronunciation: [ˈliran]) is a small island off the southwest coast of Wetar Island, Indonesia. Administratively it is part of West Wetar District (Kecamatan Wetar Barat) within the Southwest Maluku Regency (Kabupaten Maluku Barat Daya). The East Timorese island Atauro is 12 km to the southwest. Liran is the westernmost of the Barat Daya Islands in the province of Maluku. It covers an area of 39.14 km^{2} (including minor offshore islands) and had 841 inhabitants in 2019.

Liran is surrounded by coral reefs.

It has a small population, who speak Wetarese. They primarily live in the small village Ustutun on the east coast of the island, which also serves as the administrative centre for the West Wetar District. There is also a lighthouse.
