= Wetarese language =

Austronesian language of Wetar, Indonesia

Wetarese
- Wetar
- Tutunohan
- Native to: Indonesia
- Region: Wetar Island
- Native speakers: (11,000 cited 1990–2010)
- Language family: Austronesian: Malayo-Polynesian; Timor-Babar; Wetar-Atauro; Wetarese

Language codes
- ISO 639-3: Variously: apx – Aputai ilu – Iliʼuun wet – Perai tzn – Tugun
- Glottolog: weta1245
- ELP: Aputai
- Aputai is classified as Critically Endangered by the UNESCO Atlas of the World's Languages in Danger.

Wetarese is an Austronesian language of Wetar, an island in the south Maluku, Indonesia, and of the nearby island Liran.

== Background ==
The four identified principal varieties of Wetarese on Wetar – Aputai, Iliʼuun, Perai and Tugun – are distinct enough that some may consider them to be different languages.

Wetarese is closely related to Galoli (spoken on the north coast of East Timor and by an immigrant community on the south coast of Wetar) and to Atauran (spoken on Atauro island).

== Phonology ==
The following represents the Tugun dialect:

=== Consonants ===
Consonant phonemes
		Labial	Alveolar	Palatal	Velar	Glottal
Plosive	voiceless	p	t	tʃ	k	ʔ
Plosive	voiced			dʒ	ɡ	
Fricative	voiceless	f	s			h
Fricative	voiced	v				
Nasal		m	n		ŋ	
Tap/Trill			ɾ ~ r			
Lateral			l			

- /v/ may also be heard as [w] in free variation.
- /r/ is mainly heard as [r] in word-final position or in slower speech, it is heard as [ɾ] elsewhere.
- /ʔ/ only occurs in word-medial positions.

=== Vowels ===
Vowel phonemes
	Front	Central	Back
Close	i		u
Close-mid	e		o
Open		a	

- Sounds /e u/ are also heard as [ɛ ʊ].
