= Danau Tihu =

Lake on Wetar Island, Indonesia

- Location within Indonesia
- Location: Indonesia
- Coordinates: 7.796°S 126.369°E
- Basin countries: Indonesia

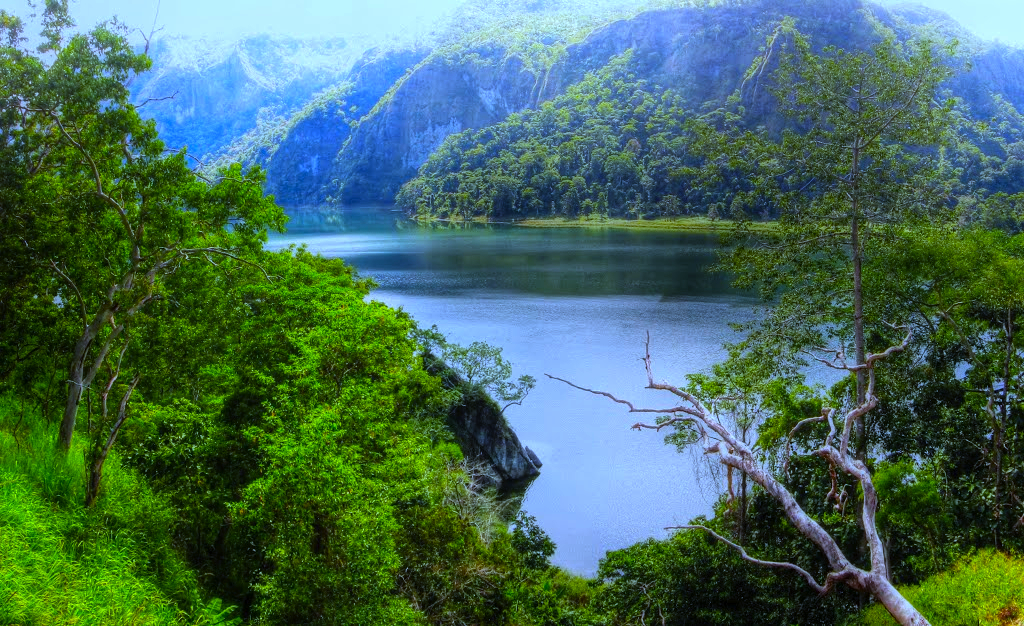
Panorama of Lake Tihu

Danau Tihu, also known as Telaga Tihu or Lake Tihu is a lake on the island of Wetar, Indonesia. The lake is the only lake on Wetar, and is notable for its biodiversity.

== Description ==
Danau Tihu is a relatively deep lake, with steep cliffs forming its outer rim. The lake is fed by several streams which flow down the mountains surrounding the body of water. The lake's features provide a habitat for several species of bird.
