= Kisar language =

Austronesian language spoken in Maluku, Indonesia

Kisar
- Meher
- Yotowawa
- Native to: Indonesia
- Region: Kisar Island, Maluku
- Native speakers: (20,000 cited 1995)
- Language family: Austronesian: Malayo-Polynesian; Central–Eastern; Kisar–Babar; Southwest Maluku; Luangic–Kisaric; Kisar–Roma; Kisar

Language codes
- ISO 639-3: kje
- Glottolog: kisa1266

Kisar is a Central Malayo-Polynesian language spoken on Kisar Island, northeast of East Timor in Maluku, Indonesia. It shares the island with Oirata, which is a Papuan language.
