= Nila language =

Austronesian language in Maluku

Nila
- Native to: Indonesia
- Region: Nila Island; relocated to Seram Island
- Extinct: 1999
- Language family: Austronesian: Malayo-Polynesian; Central–Eastern; Nuclear South Moluccan; Kisar-Babar; Southwest Maluku; Teun–Nila–Serua; Nila

Language codes
- ISO 639-3: nil
- Glottolog: nila1244
- ELP: Nila

Nila is an extinct Austronesian language originally spoken on Nila Island in Maluku, Indonesia. Speakers were relocated to Seram due to volcanic activity on Nila.
