= East Damar language =

Austronesian language spoken in Maluku, Indonesia

East Damar
- South Damar
- Native to: Indonesia
- Region: Damar Island
- Native speakers: (2,800 cited 1990)
- Language family: Austronesian: Malayo-Polynesian; Central–Eastern; Timoric; Southwest Maluku; East Damar

Language codes
- ISO 639-3: dmr
- Glottolog: east2472

East Damar is one of two Austronesian languages spoken on Damar Island in Maluku, Indonesia.

It is not closely related to the other language of Damar Island, the highly divergent West Damar language.
