= Dela–Oenale language =

Timoric language spoken in Indonesia

Dela–Oenale
- Western Rote
- Native to: Indonesia
- Region: Rote Island
- Ethnicity: Rotenese
- Native speakers: 7,000 (2002)
- Language family: Austronesian: Malayo-Polynesian; Central–Eastern; Timor–Babar; Rote–Meto; Nuclear Rote; Dela–Oenale
- Dialects: Dela (Delha); Oenale (Oe Nale)

Language codes
- ISO 639-3: row
- Glottolog: dela1251
- ELP: Dela-Oenale

Dela–Oenale (Western Rote, Delha, Oe Nale, Rote, Rote Barat, Roti) is an Austronesian language of Indonesia. Western Rote is a member of the Timor-Babar branch of Malayo-Polynesian languages spoken in west coast of Rote Island near Timor by about 7,000 people.

== Alphabet ==
Western Rote language has all 26 English letters (Aa, Bb, Cc, Dd, Ee, Ff, Gg, Hh, Ii, Jj, Kk, Ll, Mm, Nn, Oo, Pp, Qq, Rr, Ss, Tt, Uu, Vv, Ww, Xx, Yy, Zz), the glottal stop, 5 digraphs (gh, kh, mb, nd, ng, sy) and a trigraph (ngg).

gh (replaced by g), kh (k), q (k), sy, v (f), x, and z (s) are only used in loanwords and foreign names.
