= Habun language =

Language spoken in central Timor-Leste

Habu
- Region: Timor-Leste
- Native speakers: 2,700 (2010)
- Language family: Austronesian: Malayo-Polynesian; Central–Eastern; Timor–Babar; Waima'a?; Habu

Official status
- Recognised minority language in: Timor-Leste

Language codes
- ISO 639-3: hbu
- Glottolog: habu1241
- ELP: Habu
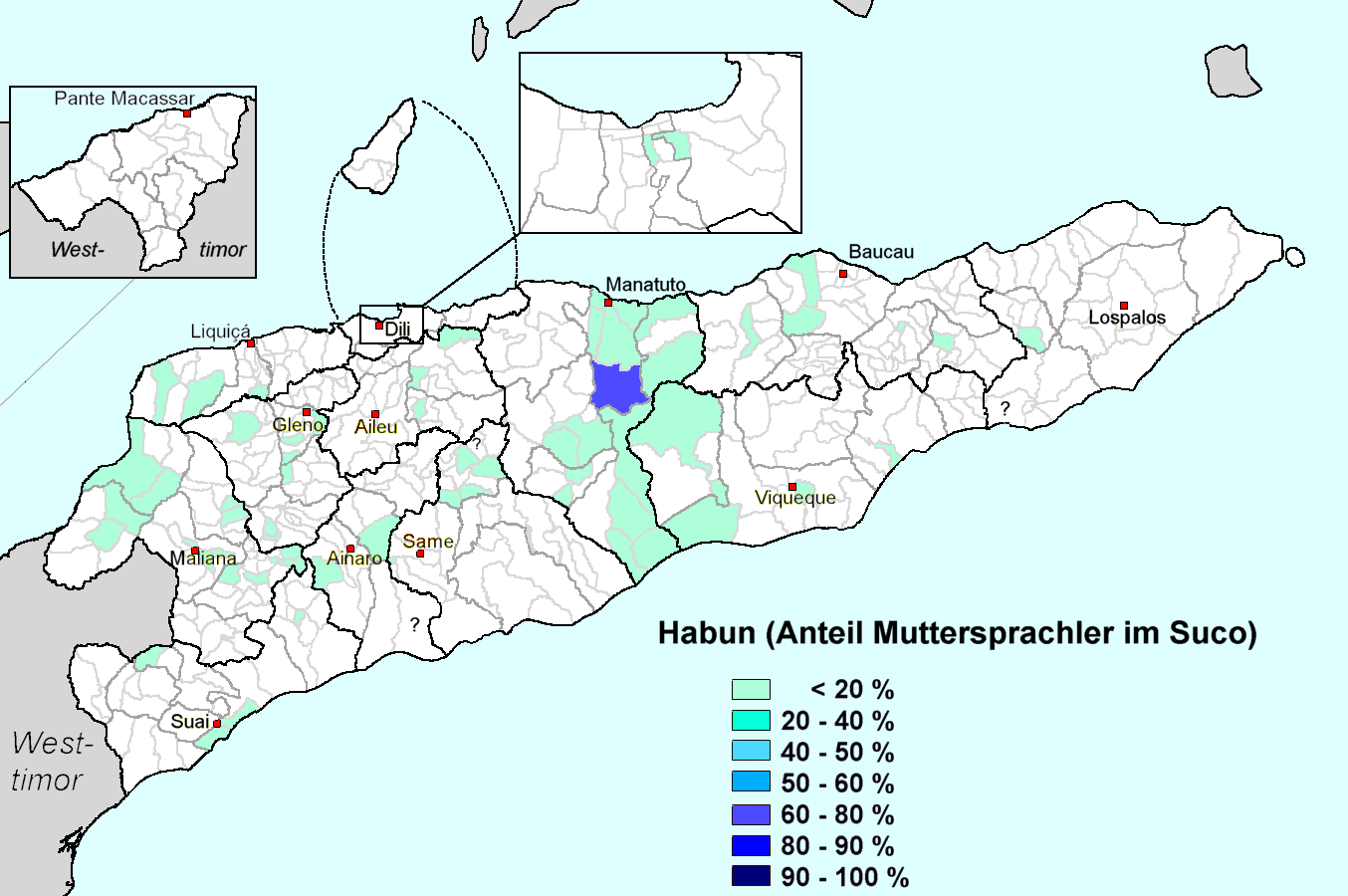
- Distribution of Habun mother-tongue speakers in Timor-Leste

Habu (Habun) is a language spoken in central Timor-Leste.
