= Mount Serua =

Volcanic island in Maluku, Indonesia

Serua
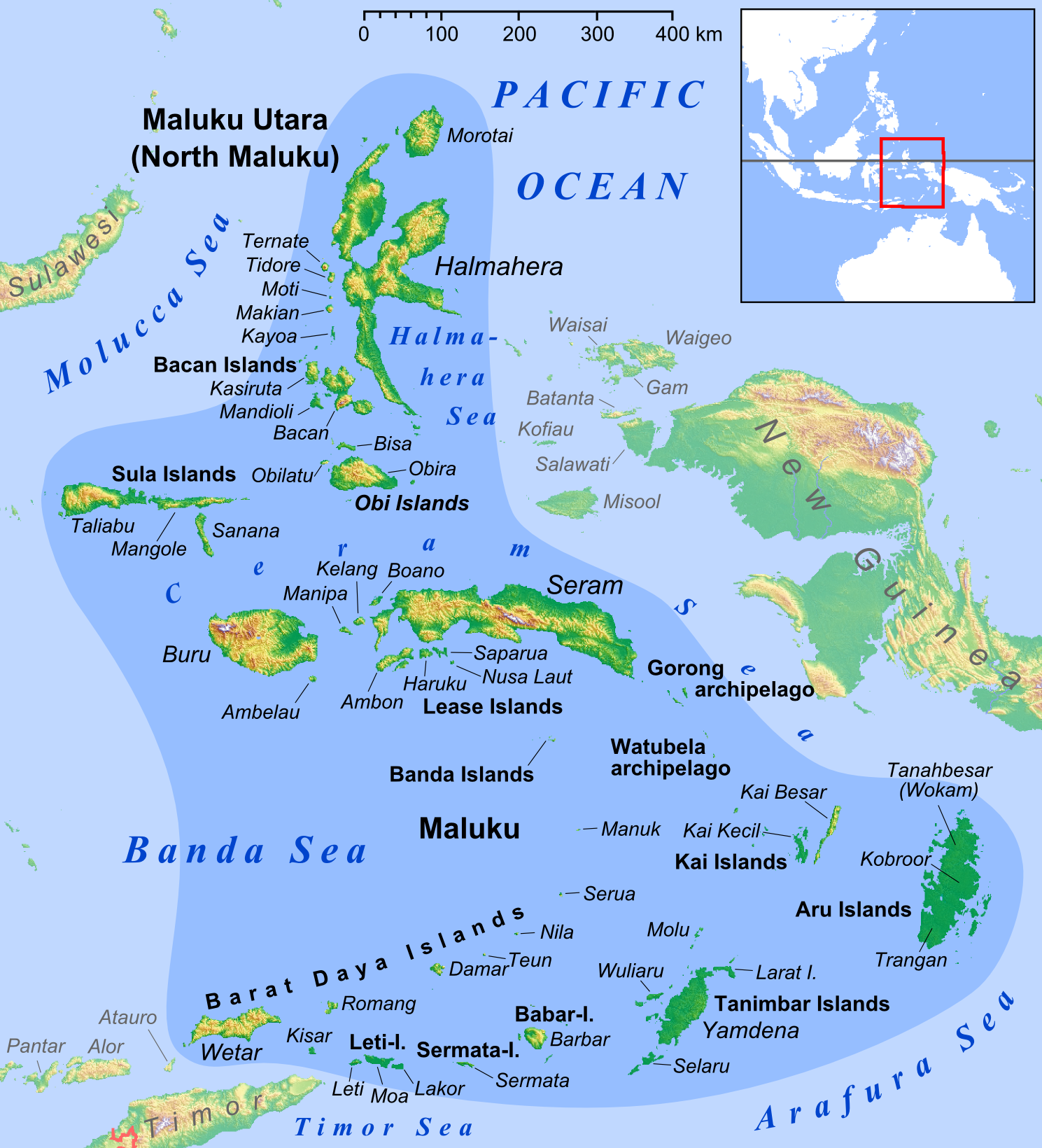

Geography
- Location: South East Asia
- Coordinates: 6°18′S 130°0′E
- Archipelago: Maluku Province
- Highest elevation: 608 m (1995 ft)
- Highest point: Mount Serua

Administration
- Indonesia

Serua is a volcanic island located in the Banda Sea, Indonesia. Administratively it is part of the Maluku Tengah Regency, Maluku Province. The main village is Jerili.

Mount Serua is a Stratovolcano on Serua Island. Its last eruption was in 1921.

The Serua language is an Austronesian language originally spoken on Serua. The inhabitants were relocated to Seram owing to volcanic activity on Serua. The relocation was carried out gradually by the Indonesian government during the late 1970s and 1980s, primarily to Tehoru and Telutih districts of Central Maluku Regency on Seram Island.

== See also ==
- List of volcanoes in Indonesia
