= Teor-Kur language =

Austronesian language spoken in Maluku, Indonesia

Teor-Kur
- Native to: Indonesia
- Region: Maluku Islands
- Native speakers: (4,500 cited 1986–2000)
- Language family: Austronesian: Malayo-Polynesian; Seram-Tanimbar-Bomberai; Teor-Kur
- Dialects: Teor (Tio’or); Kur

Language codes
- ISO 639-3: Either: kuv – Kur tev – Teor
- Glottolog: teor1239

Teor and Kur are two Austronesian language varieties of the Central–Eastern Malayo-Polynesian branch spoken near Kei Island, Indonesia. They are reportedly mutually intelligible.
