= Luang language =

Austronesian language spoken in Maluku, Indonesia

Luang
- Literi Lagona
- Native to: Indonesia
- Region: Babar Islands
- Native speakers: (18,000 cited 1995)
- Language family: Austronesian: Malayo-Polynesian (MP); Central–Eastern MP; Timoric; South–East Timor; Luangic–Kisaric; Luangic; Luang
- Dialects: Lakor; Luang; Moa; Wetan (Wetang)

Language codes
- ISO 639-3: lex
- Glottolog: luan1263
- ELP: Luang

Luang, also known as Literi Lagona (Letri Lgona), is an Austronesian language spoken in the Leti Islands and the Babar Islands in Maluku, Indonesia. It is closely related to the neighboring Leti language, with 89% shared basic vocabulary.

== Phonology ==
=== Consonants ===
		Labial	Dental/ Alveolar	Dorsal	Glottal
Plosive	voiceless	p	t̪	k	ʔ
Plosive	voiced		d	ɡ	
Fricative		f	s		h
Nasal		m	n		
Trill			r		
Lateral			l		
Approximant		w		j	

- Palatalization and labialization [ʲ, ʷ] among sounds may occur when preceding glide sounds /w, j/.
- /ɡ/ can be heard as [ɣ] in free variation.
- /m, n/ can be heard as [ŋ] when preceding /k/.
- /w/ can be heard as [ʋ] when preceding a consonant. It can be heard as [v] when between two high vowels, and can also be heard freely as [β] when between a non-high vowel and a high vowel.
- /r/ can be heard as [ɾ] in fast speech.
- /t̪, d/ when palatalized as [t̪ʲ, dʲ], can be heard as affricate sounds [tʃ, dʒ] when in fast speech.

=== Vowels ===
	Front	Central	Back
Close	i		u
Mid	e		o
Open		a	

- An epenthetical schwa [ə̆] can be heard in between homorganic consonants.
- /e/ can be heard as [ɛ] word-medially in closed syllables, and in stressed and pre-stressed syllables.
- /a/ can be heard as [ə] word-finally and in both stressed and post-stressed syllables.
