= Teun language =

Extinct Austronesian language of Indonesia

Teun
- Native to: Indonesia
- Region: Seram Island
- Ethnicity: 1,200 (1990)
- Extinct: 2013
- Language family: Austronesian: Malayo-Polynesian; Central–Eastern; Timoric; Southwest Maluku; Teun–Nila–Serua; Teun

Language codes
- ISO 639-3: tve
- Glottolog: teun1241
- ELP: Te'un

Teun (also rendered Teʼun) is an Austronesian language originally spoken on Teun Island (Mesa, Yafila and Wotludan villages) and Nila Island (Bumei village) in Maluku, Indonesia. Speakers were relocated to Seram due to volcanic activity on Teun.
