= Serua language =

Extinct Austronesian language of Serua Island, Indonesia

Serua
- Native to: Indonesia
- Region: Seram Island
- Extinct: by 2024
- Language family: Austronesian: Malayo-Polynesian; Central–Eastern; Timoric; Southwest Maluku; Teun–Nila–Serua; Serua

Language codes
- ISO 639-3: srw
- Glottolog: seru1245

Serua is an extinct Austronesian language originally spoken on Serua Island in Maluku, Indonesia. Speakers were relocated to Seram due to volcanic activity on Serua. The language continues in communities in Waipia in Seram, where the islanders were resettled, along with those also from Nila and Teun. Here, the older generation retained the island language as a strong form of identity. It was found to be extinct in 2024.

At the end of World War II, many Seruans were relocated to the Netherlands. Having fought on the side of the Dutch during Indonesian independence, they became part of the KNIL resettlement. The TNS (Teun Nila Serua) groups maintain an island community in the Netherlands, but the language is not maintained.

== Phrases ==
Noko may – 'How are you?'

Mel melleh taroʼoh – 'I am well'

Kupna – 'Money'

Kupna tell tella waitna – 'I have no money'

Wauka – 'whisper'

Ternosri. Am salalu metoranowa – 'Farewell till later, I will always wait for you.'

A song of heave-ho to accompany pulling boats to shore: Wauka, wauke; Tiki lowati, Sapi lowati; Timore; Timotei; Wateo
