= Bilba language =

Language in Indonesia

Bilba
- Eastern Rote
- Native to: Indonesia
- Region: Rote Island
- Ethnicity: Rotenese
- Native speakers: 7,000 (2002)
- Language family: Austronesian: Malayo-Polynesian; Central–Eastern; Timoric; West Timor; Rote; Bilba
- Dialects: Bilba; Diu; Lelenuk

Language codes
- ISO 639-3: bpz
- Glottolog: bilb1242

Bilba (Belubaa) is a Central Malayo-Polynesian language of Roti Island, off Timor, Indonesia.
