= West Damar language =

Austronesian language spoken in Maluku, Indonesia

West Damar
- North Damar
- Damar Batumerah
- Native to: Indonesia
- Region: Maluku Islands
- Native speakers: (800 cited 1987)
- Language family: Austronesian: Malayo-Polynesian; Timor-Babar; Southwest Maluku; Babar; Peripheral; West Damar

Language codes
- ISO 639-3: drn
- Glottolog: west2548

West Damar, or North Damar, is an Austronesian language of Damar Island, one of the Maluku Islands of Indonesia. In spite of rather low cognacy rates with its neighboring languages, it can be classified as part of the Babar languages based on shared innovations.

It is spoken in two villages (Batumerah, Kuai) located in the north-western part of Damar.

== Phonology ==
The consonant inventory of West Damar is as follows:

| | | Labial | Alveolar | Palatal | Velar | Glottal |
|---|---|---|---|---|---|---|
| Plosive/Affricate | voiceless | p | t | t͡ʃ | k | |
| Plosive/Affricate | voiced | (b) | d | | (ɡ) | |
| Nasal | | m | n | ɲ | ŋ | |
| Fricative | | | s | | x | h |
| Trill | | | r | | | |
| Lateral | | | l | | | |
| Approximant | | w | | j | | |

- Sounds /b ɡ/ only occur in loanwords from Indonesian. /ŋ/ also mostly, but not exclusively, appears in loanwords.

The vowel inventory of West Damar is simply /a e i o u/.

== Morphology ==
A few aspects of West Damar morphology are noted as follows.

=== Verb conjugation ===
Verbs in West Damar are conjugated according to person and number.

West Damar verbal prefixes
| Person/number | Prefix | Verb -oni "to eat" | Other attested verbs |
|---|---|---|---|
| 1st sg. | w- | woni | |
| 2nd sg. | m- | moni | |
| 3rd sg. | n- (Note: Becomes ng- before velar consonants.) | yoni | n-poko "explodes", n-woludlo "hunts", n-hakro "boils", n-dekro "is dry", ng-kerso "is thin", |
| 1st pl. inclusive | k-, t- | toni | k-la "we go", k-wadano "we hear", k-hoto "we talk", k-mattuni "we sleep", k-nehi "we run" |
| 1st pl. exclusive | m- | moni | |
| 2nd pl. | m- -y-, (Note: The -y- is attached after the initial consonant of a verb stem, so from -lo "go" is born mlyo.) ms- | msoni | mlyo "you go", mnyedi "you fall" |
| 3rd pl. | r- | roni | |

=== Possession ===
West Damar has a series of possessive suffixes that are attached to nouns. There is no possessive verb. The possessive suffixes are as follows:

West Damar possessive suffixes
| Person/number | Suffix |
|---|---|
| 1st sg. | -cheni |
| 2nd sg. | -mcheni |
| 3rd sg. | -eni |
| 1st pl. inclusive | -toni |
| 1st pl. exclusive | -moni |
| 2nd pl. | -mseni |
| 3rd pl. | -roni |

The possessive suffixes are built from a base suffix -ni that also appears as a lexical derivational suffix:

- ulcho + -ni > ulchuni "husband"
- deweya + -ni > deweyeni "wife"
- ullo "month" + -ni > ulloni "moon"

=== Negation ===
The word for "no" in West Damar is kewe. When split into a circumfix, ke- -we serves as a simple negator for content words like nouns, verbs, and adjectives. The -we part of the negator comes immediately after the stem it attaches to, but before other clitics. A few examples of negation provided by Chlenova are as follows:

ke-mormorsa-we
NEG-buffalo-NEG
"not a buffalo"

Piter ke-tucha-we-mo odo-i
Peter NEG-old-NEG-? 1SG-DET
"Peter (is) not as old as I (am)"

Another negative predicative word krawui "unavailable" is also recorded.

== Vocabulary ==
Vocabulary list:

| West Damar | Indonesian | English |
|---|---|---|
| odo | saya | I |
| ede | engkau | you (sing.) |
| idi | dia | he, she |
| itito | kita | we (incl.) |
| odomo | kami | we (exc.) |
| edmi | kamu | you (pl.) |
| idiro | mereka | they |
| mehno | satu | one |
| wyeru | dua | two |
| wyetteli | tiga | three |
| wyoto | empat | four |
| wilimo | lima | five |
| wyenamo | enam | six |
| witi | tujuh | seven |
| way | delapan | eight |
| wisi | sembilan | nine |
| uswuti | sepuluh | ten |
| ulkona | kepala | head |
| lima | tangan | hand |
| eya | kaki | foot |

=== Sample sentences ===
Ede mpondai? - Are you ill?

E’e, odo ulkonacheni nchepondo. - Yes, I have a headache.

Wohleyo Binayani idihe hulchupondeheti wohleyo Ahehendini - The mountain Binaya is the highest at the Seram island.

== See also ==
- East Damar language
