= Ringgou language =

Timoric language spoken in Indonesia

Ringgou
- Rikou
- Eastern Rote
- Native to: Indonesia
- Region: Rote Island
- Ethnicity: Rotenese
- Native speakers: 12,000 (2011)
- Language family: Austronesian: Malayo-Polynesian; Central–Eastern; Timoric; West Timor; Rote; Ringgou
- Dialects: Ringgou; Landu; Oe Pao

Language codes
- ISO 639-3: rgu
- Glottolog: ring1244
- ELP: Rikou

Ringgou (Rikou) is a Central Malayo-Polynesian language of Roti Island, off Timor, Indonesia.
