= Geoffrey Hull =

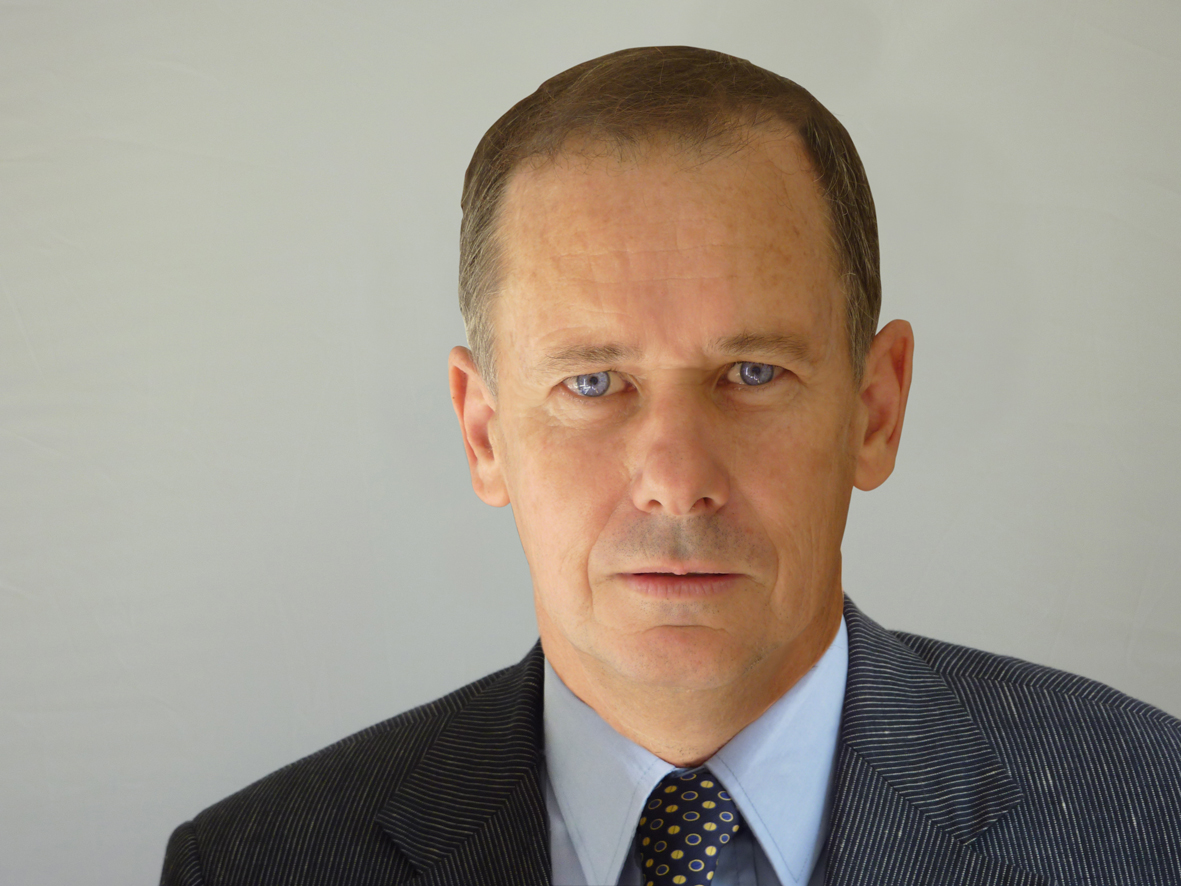
Geoffrey Hull

Geoffrey Stephen Hull (born 6 September 1955) is an Australian linguist, ethnologist and historian who has made contributions to the study of Romance, Celtic, Slavonic, Semitic, Austronesian and Papuan languages, in particular to the relationship between language and culture.

== Life and career ==
Of English and Scots ancestry on his father's side, his maternal family belonged to the Latin community of Egypt (of mixed Maltese, Venetian, Triestine and French descent) which left that country during the post-war period of nationalization (1946–1957). He grew up familiar with the large range of languages spoken in his extended family (French, Maltese, Italian and various dialects of Italy, Occitan, Slovene, Greek and Arabic).

=== Education and academic career ===
Hull studied arts at the University of Sydney (1974–1982), completing a doctorate in historical linguistics after dialectological research in Italy and Switzerland. His PhD thesis was a reconstruction of the Padanian language underlying the modern Gallo-Italian, Venetian and Ladin dialects. Before graduation he also undertook studies in philosophy and theology at the Aquinas Academy, Sydney.

In his academic career Hull taught in the areas of linguistics and modern and classical European languages at Sydney University, Melbourne University, the University of Wollongong and other Australian tertiary institutions. He is a professional lexicographer and a translator working in over a dozen languages. He is currently an adjunct professor at Macquarie University, Sydney.

=== Achievements in East Timor and work on the Tetum language ===
In the 1990s he assisted the East Timorese leadership in exile by standardizing Tetum and creating a range of linguistic and literary resources for this and other languages of East Timor, then under Indonesian occupation. He was also a member of a human rights delegation organized by the Australian Catholic Social Justice Council which visited the country in 1997 amid escalating violence and reported to the United Nations, the Indonesian Human Rights Commission, the Australian government and the Vatican. In September 1999 he testified before the Australian Senate Inquiry on East Timor on abuses he had witnessed in that country during past visits. From 2001 to 2007 he was research and publications director of the Instituto Nacional de Linguística, the national language authority of the independent state of Timor-Leste. He was the designer, principal author and editor of the national Tetum dictionary and was founder and co-editor of the academic journal Estudos de Línguas e Culturas de Timor-Leste.

=== Awards ===
On 22 May 2012, Hull was awarded the honour of Comendador da Ordem do Infante Dom Henrique (Knight Commander of the Order of Prince Henry) by the President of Portugal, Aníbal Cavaco Silva, for services to the Portuguese language.

=== Other areas of interest ===
Outside the field of linguistics Hull is known for writings on religious questions, most notably the historical causes and socio-cultural impact of church reforms of the 1960s on the Latin Catholic and Eastern Catholic traditions.

== Select publications ==
- "The Linguistic Unity of Northern Italy and Rhaetia", PhD thesis, University of Sydney, 1982
- "La lingua 'padanese': Corollario dell'unità dei dialetti reto-cisalpini". rivista Etnie, 13 1987
- "Franco-Maltese". in James Jupp, ed., The Australian People: An Encyclopedia of the Nation, its People and their Origins. Sydney: Angus and Robertson, 1988
- Polyglot Italy: Languages, Dialects, Peoples. Melbourne: CIS Educational, 1989
- "Parallels and Convergences in Celtic and Romance Philology". Australian Celtic Journal, 1 1989
- "Vocabulary Renewal Trends in the Modern Celtic Languages". Origins and Revivals: Proceedings of the First Australian Conference of Celtic Studies, pp. 69–90.
- "Idealist Nationalism and Linguistic Dogma in Italy". In The Shared Horizon. Dublin: The Academic Press, 1990
- Timor Oriental: n'est-ce qu'il qu'une question politique? Églises d'Asia: Agence d'Information des Missions Etrangères de Paris, Dossiers et documents No. 9/92, 1992
- The Malta Language Question: A Case Study in Cultural Imperialism. Malta: Said International, 1993
- Building the Kingdom: Mary MacKillop and Social Justice. Melbourne: Collins Dove, 1994
- Orientação para a Padronização da Língua Tetum. Instituto de Estudos Timorenses "Maria Mackillop" - Sydney, (Sydney). 1994
- Mai Kolia Tetun. A Course in Tetum-Praça. Australian Catholic Relief and the Australian Catholic Social Justice Council 1998
- Timor-Leste: Identidade, Língua e Política Educacional. Lisbon: Ministério dos Negócios Estrangeiros/Instituto Camões, 2001
- The Languages of East Timor. Some Basic Facts, Instituto Nacional de Linguística, National University of East Timor. The Languages of East Timor
- Standard Tetum-English Dictionary 2nd Ed, Allen & Unwin Publishers ISBN 978-1-86508-599-9, 2002
- (with Lance Eccles). Gramática da Língua Tétum. Lisbon: Lidel, 2005
- (with Halyna Koscharsky) "Contours and consequences of the lexical divide in Ukrainian". Australian Slavonic and East European Studies, Vol 20, Nos 1–2, 2006
- The Banished Heart: Origins of Heteropraxis in the Catholic Church. 2nd Edition. London: T&T Clark, 2010
- The Linguistic Unity of Northern Italy and Rhaetia: Historical Grammar of the Padanian Language, 2 voll., Sidney: Beta Crucis, 2017

== Sources ==
- Adelaidean, News from Adelaide university (p. 6), 10 April 2000
- Berdichevsky, Norman: A Reminder of the Authentic Semitic non-Arab Identity of the Ancient Mediterranean World (May 2007), New English review, http://www.newenglishreview.org/custpage.cfm?frm=6806&sec_id=6806
- Boon, Danielle (Adult Literacy Advisor, Ministry of Education and Culture of East Timor), UNDP Timor-Leste: Literacy in East Timor
- Current Language Issues in East Timor: Text of a public lecture given at the University of Adelaide, 29 March 2000, https://web.archive.org/web/20100518110717/http://www.ramelau.com/tetum/issues.html
- Grenfell, Laura: Legal Pluralism and the Rule of Law in Timor Leste, Leiden Journal of International Law (2006), 19:2:305-337 Cambridge University Press, doi:10.1017/S0922156506003323
- https://web.archive.org/web/20081023131216/http://webzoom.freewebs.com/jpesperanca/lusofonia_Parte_3.pdf (p. 40 et seq.)
- Instituto camoes: O português, língua timorense; Número 88, 6-19 de Julho de 2005 Suplemento do JL, Nº 907, Ano XXV, https://web.archive.org/web/20120301184327/http://www.instituto-camoes.pt/encarte/encarte88a.htm
- Interview with Prof. Hull at the ABC national radio: http://www.abc.net.au/rn/arts/ling/stories/s113139.htm
- Interview with Prof. Hull at News Weekly
- Köster, Dietrich (Bona), Política linguística de Timor-Leste: a reintrodução do português como língua oficial e de ensino, Lusorama, 57-58 (Maio de 2004), pág. 172–179, ISSN 0931-9484
- Köster, Dietrich (Deutsche Gesellschaft für die afrikanischen Staaten portugiesischer Sprache), Política Linguística de Timor-Leste: A Reintrodução do Português como Língua Oficial e de Ensino, Estudos de Línguas e Culturas de Timor-Leste/Studies in Languages and Cultures of East Timor, número 6, 2004, pág. 1–7, Instituto Nacional de Linguística da Universidade Nacional Timor Lorosa'e, ISSN 1441-1105
- Köster, Dietrich: Sprachpolitik Osttimors - Die Wiedereinführung des Portugiesischen als Amts- und Unterrichtssprache, https://web.archive.org/web/20100501084718/http://www.colonialvoyage.com/timorsprachpolitik.html
- Leclerc, Jacques, L'Aménagement linguistique dans le monde: Timor Lorosae (République de Timor Lorosae), Université Laval, Québec 2004, http://www.tlfq.ulaval.ca/axl/asie/timor_est.htm
- Prof. Hull's Tetum courses in Sydney: https://web.archive.org/web/20110715051109/http://www.pasthound.com/topics/Tetum?PHPSESSID=2ros07p49gp13ik7ob8duggmj1
- Stephens, M 2006, 'Healing Timor Leste through language understanding', in Healing Timor Leste: a consultation of specialists, ed. M King-Boyes, Tony Kitchener Printing pty ltd, Adelaide
- Vassalo Thake, Clare: Identity and instruction, (p. 356) in: Stella Borg Barthet (Editor) - A Sea for Encounters: Essays Towards a Postcolonial Commonwealth, Rodopi (5 November 2009), ISBN 978-90-420-2764-0
