= Romang language =

Austronesian language spoken in Maluku, Indonesia

Romang
- Roma
- Region: Jerusu village, Romang, Maluku Islands, Indonesia
- Native speakers: (1,700 cited 1991)
- Language family: Austronesian: Malayo-Polynesian; Central–Eastern; Nuclear South Moluccan; Kisar–Babar; Luangic–Kisaric; Roma–Kisar; Romang

Language codes
- ISO 639-3: rmm
- Glottolog: roma1332

Roma or Romang is a Malayo-Polynesian language spoken by about 1,700 people (in 1991) in Jersusu village on Romang island in Maluku, Indonesia.
