= Galoli language =

Timoric language spoken in Timor-Leste

Galoli
- Galolen
- Native to: Timor-Leste, Indonesia
- Region: Manatuto District, Wetar
- Ethnicity: Galoli people
- Native speakers: 11,000 (2010 census)
- Language family: Austronesian: Malayo-Polynesian; Timor-Babar; Wetar-Atauro; Galoli
- Dialects: Baba; Edi; Hahak; Na Nahek (Nanaek); Nuclear Galoli; Talur; Hiay; Ilputih; Ilwaki

Official status
- Recognised minority language in: East Timor

Language codes
- ISO 639-3: gal
- Glottolog: galo1243
- ELP: Galoli
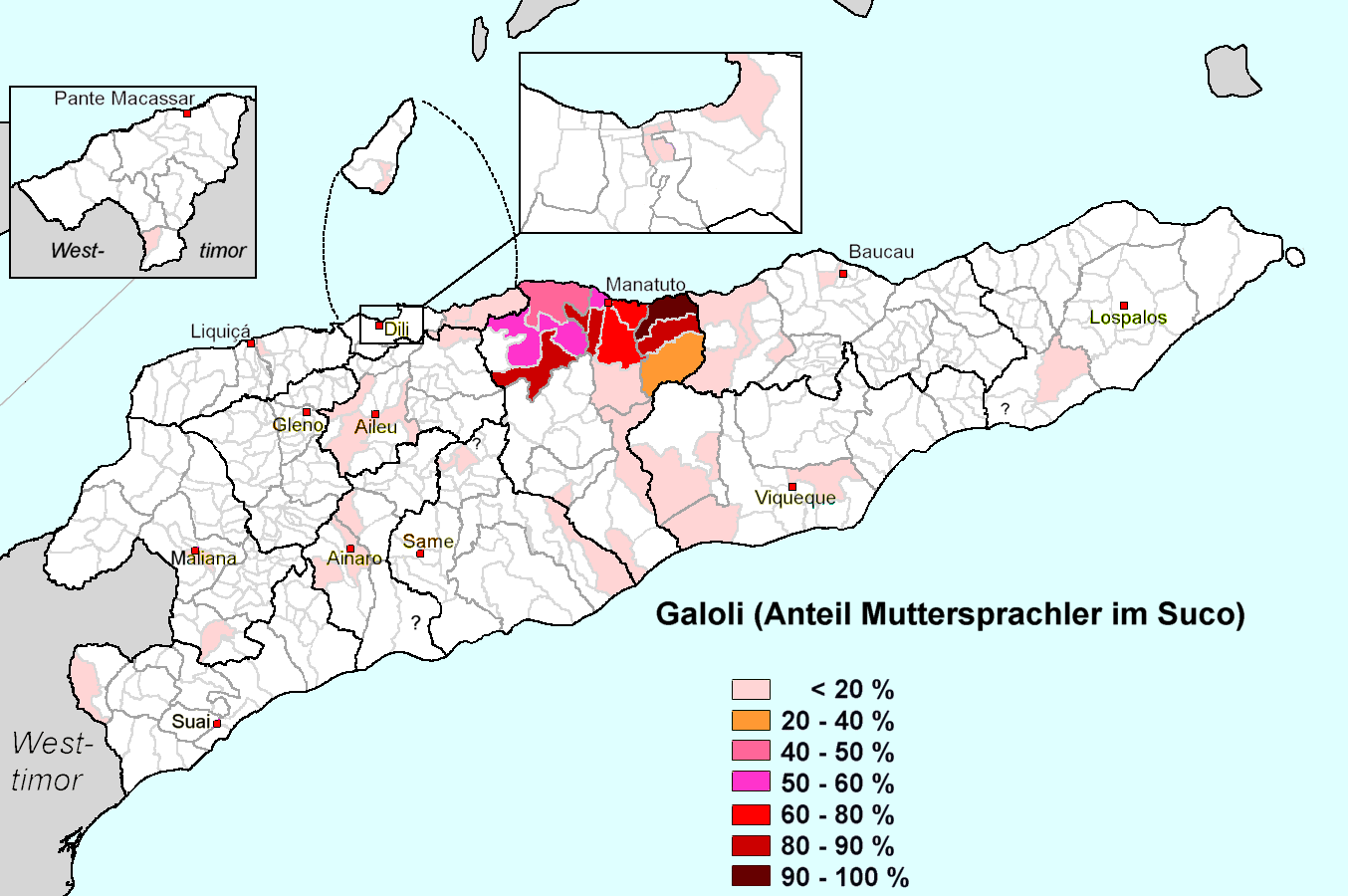
- Distribution of Galoli mother tongue-speakers in Timor-Leste. Galoli is also spoken on the south coast of Wetar Island in Indonesia, just off the top of the map.

The Galoli, or Galolen, is a language of the East Timorese with a population of around 50,000, mainly along the northern coast of the Manatuto district. To the west lies the Mambai language. There is an old colony on the southern coast of Wetar island, the Talo people, who speak the Talur dialect.

The Galoli language is one of the Timor–Babar group of Austronesian languages. It is one of the national languages designated by the constitution of East Timor. Because the area was used as a trading center for different cultures, there are many foreign loan words in the vocabulary, principally from Moluccan and Malay languages. Although it is not spoken by as many people as other national languages, it was adopted by the Roman Catholic Church in the district of Manatuto and thus has become fixed in grammars and dictionaries.

Dadu'a is erroneously listed in some sources as a dialect of Galoli (e.g. Glottolog), but actually represents a transplanted population of the Atauro dialect of Wetarese.

== Alphabet ==
A B D E G H I K L M N O R S T U '

The ⟨'⟩ mark represents a glottal stop, [ʔ].
