= Wetar =

Island in Indonesia

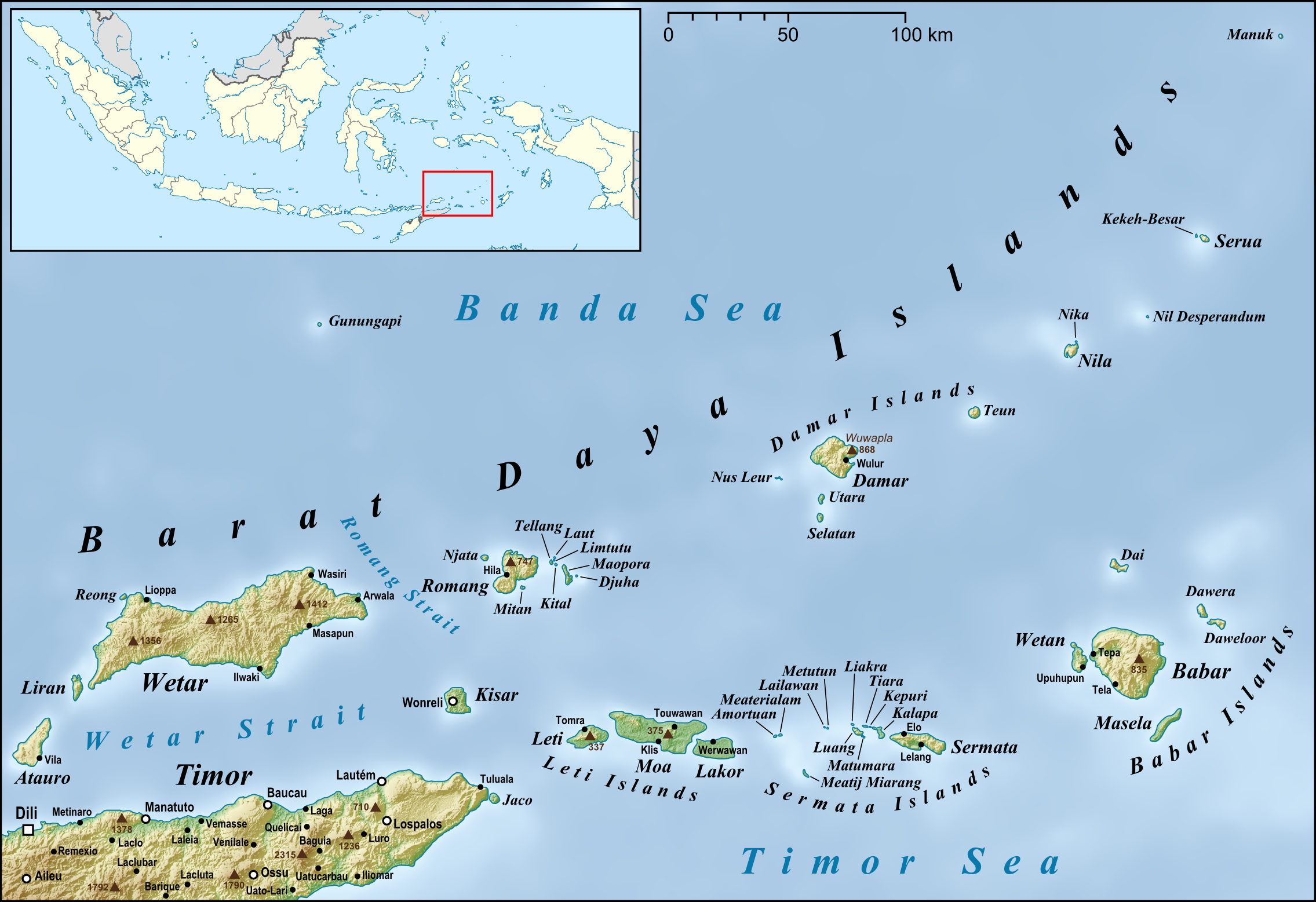

- Location within Indonesia

Geography
- Location: South East Asia
- Coordinates: 7°48′S 126°18′E
- Archipelago: Barat Daya Islands
- Area: 2,651.8 km^{2} (1,023.9 sq mi)

Administration
- Indonesia
- Province: Maluku
- Regency: Maluku Barat Daya
- District: Wetar

Demographics
- Population: 11,109 (mid 2023)
- Pop. density: 4.2/km^{2} (10.9/sq mi)

Additional information
- Time zone: IEST (UTC+09:00)

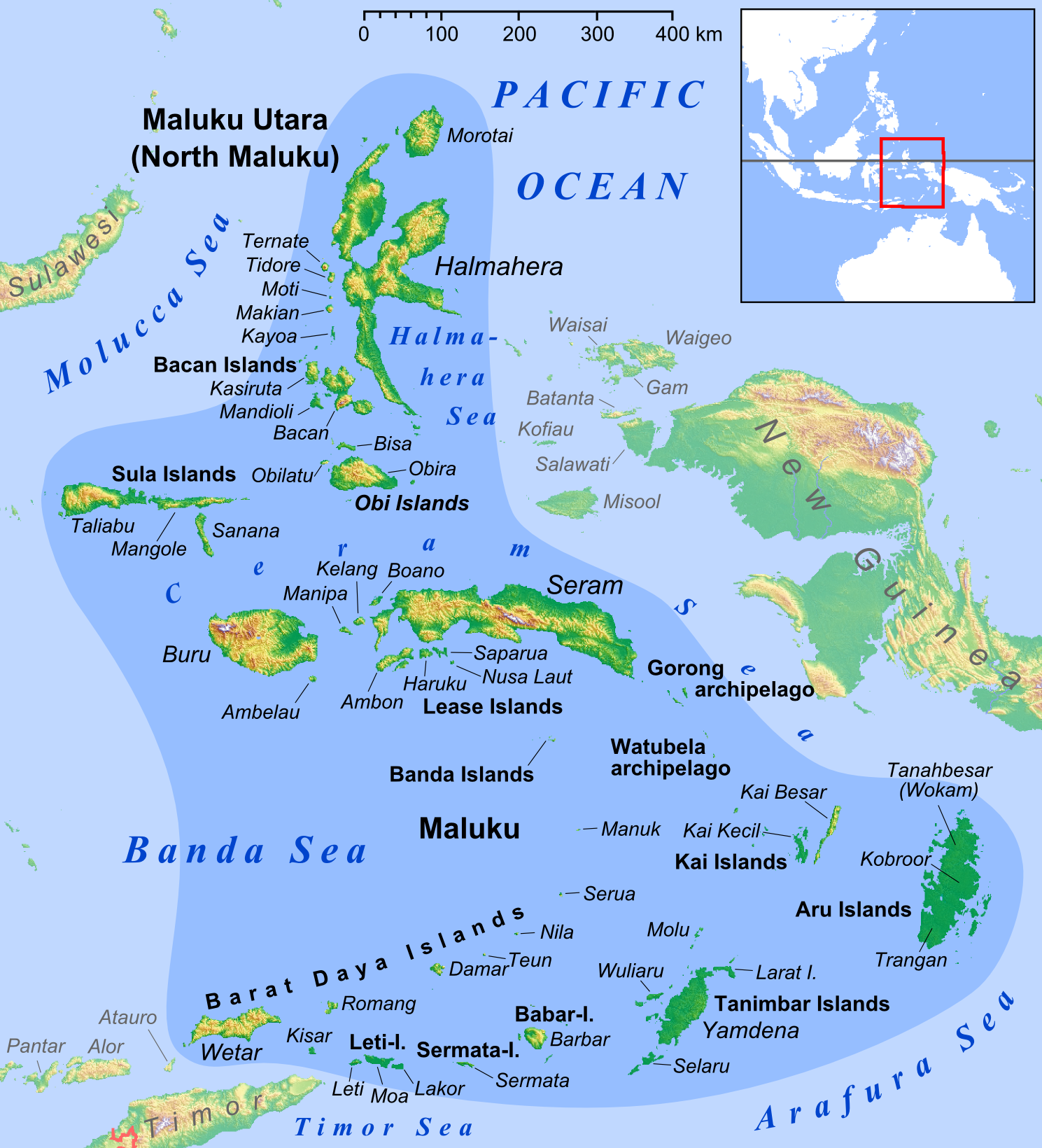
Wetar in the southwest of Maluku Islands as a part of the Barat Daya Islands

Wetar is a tropical island which belongs to the Indonesian province of Maluku and is the largest island of the Maluku Barat Daya Islands (literally Southwest Islands) Regency of the Maluku Islands. It lies east of the Lesser Sunda Islands, which include nearby Alor and Timor, but it is politically part of the Maluku Islands. To the south, across the Wetar Strait, lies the island of Timor; at its closest it is 50 km away. To the west, across the Ombai Strait, lies the island of Alor. To the southwest is the very small island of Liran, which is also part of West Wetar District (Kecamatan Wetar Barat) and, further southwest, the small East Timorese island of Atauro. To the north is the Banda Sea and to the east lie Romang and Damar Islands, while to the southeast lie the other principal islands of the Barat Daya Islands. Including Liran and other small offshore islands, Wetar has an area of 2,651.8 km^{2}, and had a population of 7,916 at the 2010 Census and 8,622 at the 2020 Census; the official estimate as at mid 2023 was 11,109. Administratively, Wetar is divided into four of the districts (kecamatan) of the Maluku Barat Daya Regency.

Wetar is one of the 92 officially listed outlying islands of Indonesia.

The principal towns on Wetar are Lioppa in the northwest, Ilwaki in the south, Wasiri in the north, Masapun in the east, and Arwala in the northeast. These are connected by roads.

== Geography ==
Wetar is 120 km long (measured from to east-most tip to west-most tip), and about 43 km north-to-south. It has an area of approximately 2,651.8 km^{2}. It is surrounded by coral reefs and deep seas. The highest point on the island is 1412 m.

Wetar is part of a volcanic island arc which includes the other Barat Daya Islands and the Banda Islands, created by the collision of the Indo-Australian Plate and the Eurasian Plate. It is not, however, principally of volcanic origin, being instead mainly oceanic crust that has been lifted by the plate collision. The stratovolcano Gunungapi Wetar forms an isolated island to the north of Wetar.

There are a number of gold mines on Wetar, which have been poorly managed and constitute an environmental concern.

Along with other nearby islands, it formed part of Wallacea, the area of deep water separated from both the Asian and Australian continental shelves. This region is known for its unusual fauna, and Wetar is no exception. It has 162 species of birds, three of which are endemic, and four of which are endangered. Rainfall is highly seasonal based on the monsoon, and the islands are mostly covered in tropical dry broadleaf forests that are partly deciduous, with many trees losing their leaves in the dry season. It forms part of the Timor and Wetar deciduous forests ecoregion.

The island has one single lake, Danau Tihu.

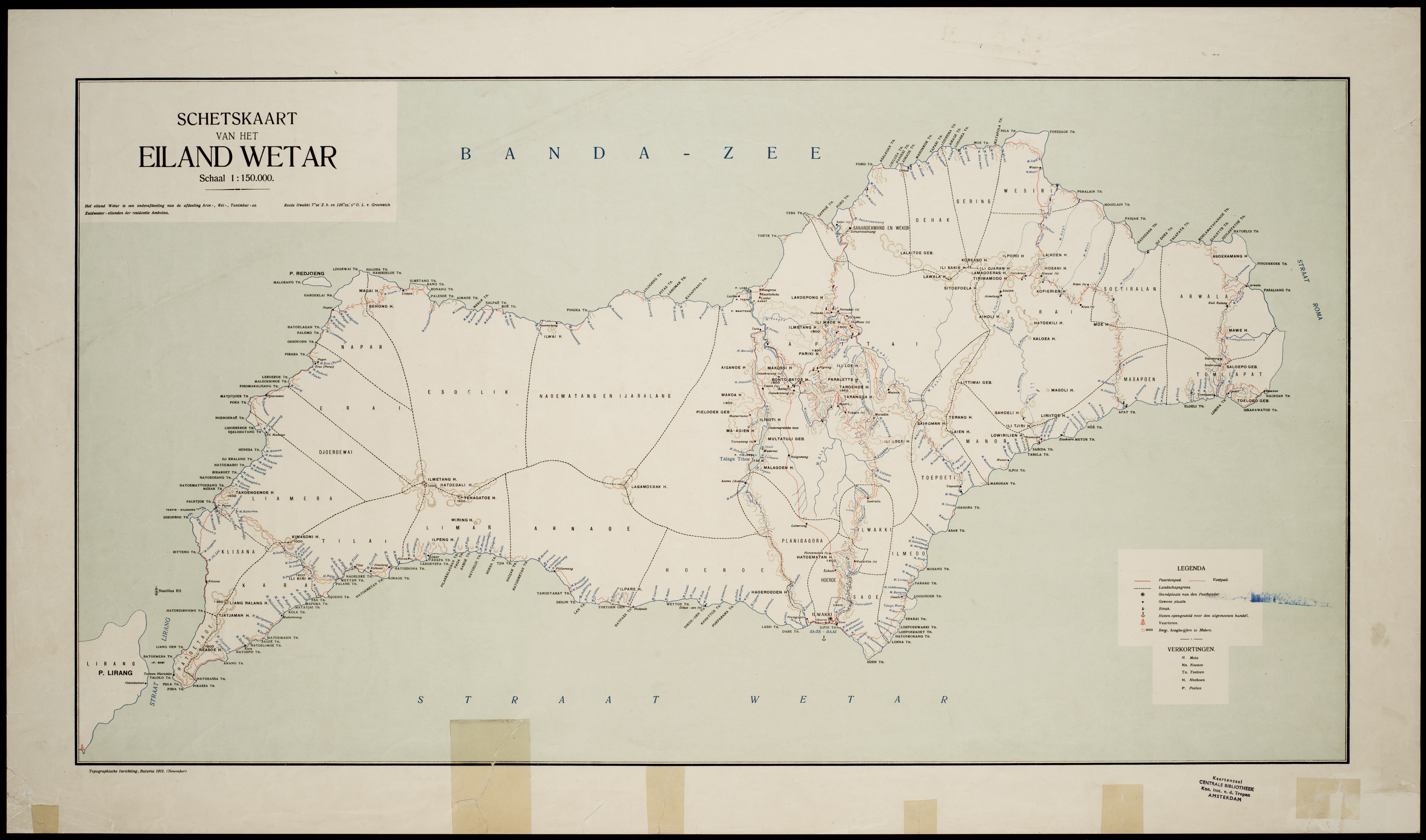
Map of the island of Wetar in 1911, showing local administrative (Landschap) boundaries.

== Culture ==
There are a number of Malayo-Polynesian languages endemic to Wetar and the nearby islands of Liran and Atauro. Called Wetarese, they are Aputai, Ili'uun, Perai, and Tugun. There is also Talur, a dialect of Galoli of East Timor. These are spoken by small groups of about 1,000 people each. The national language Indonesian and regional Ambonese Malay are commonly used.

The main economic activity on Wetar is subsistence agriculture, principally of sago. Tortoise shells are also gathered and exported to countries where the trade is not banned.

== Endemic fauna ==
- Wetar ground-dove
- Wetar figbird
- Wetar Island python
- Wetar lorikeet

== See also ==
- Wetarese languages
- Wetar Strait
