= Central Malayo-Polynesian languages =

Proposed branch of the Austronesian language family

Central Malayo-Polynesian
- South Moluccan
- (proposed)
- Geographic distribution: Indonesia
- Linguistic classification: Austronesian: Malayo-Polynesian; Central–Eastern Malayo-Polynesian; Central Malayo-Polynesian

Language codes
- ISO 639-5: plf
- The Central MP languages (red). (In black is the Wallace Line.) In Grimes & Edwards' conception, more of the Bomerai Peninsula to the northeast is included.

The Central Malayo-Polynesian languages (CMP) are a proposed branch in the Malayo-Polynesian subgroup of the Austronesian language family. The languages are spoken in the Lesser Sunda and Maluku Islands of the Banda Sea, in an area corresponding closely to the Indonesian provinces of East Nusa Tenggara and Maluku and the nation of East Timor (excepting the Papuan languages of Timor and nearby islands), but with the Bima language extending to the eastern half of Sumbawa Island in the province of West Nusa Tenggara and the Sula languages of the Sula archipelago in the southwest corner of the province of North Maluku. The principal islands in this region are Sumbawa, Sumba, Flores, Timor, Buru, and Seram. The numerically most important languages are Bima, Manggarai of western Flores, Uab Meto of West Timor, and Tetum, the national language of East Timor.

Blust proposes that the CMP languages form a linkage, which means that the CMP languages share a common ancestor and many overlapping innovations, none of which however are found in all CMP languages.

== Internal subgrouping ==
Based on the Glottolog database, CMP can be provisionally divided into the following subgroups:

- Bima, spoken on the eastern half of Sumbawa Island.
- Sumba–Flores languages, spoken on and around the islands of Sumba and western–central Flores in the Lesser Sundas.
- Flores–Lembata languages, spoken in the Lesser Sundas, on eastern Flores and small islands immediately east of Flores.
- Selaru languages, spoken in the Tanimbar Islands of Indonesia.
- Kei–Tanimbar languages, spoken in the Kei and Tanimbar Islands of the southern Malukus, and on the north side of the Bomberai Peninsula.
- Aru languages, spoken on the Aru Islands in Indonesia.
- Central Maluku languages, spoken principally on the Seram, Buru, Ambon, Kei, and the Sula Islands.
- Timoric languages, spoken on the islands of Timor, neighboring Wetar, and Southwest Maluku to the east.
- Babar languages, spoken on the Babar Islands.
- Kowiai language, spoken on the Bomberai Peninsula in New Guinea.
- Teor-Kur language, spoken near Kei Island, Indonesia.

=== Edwards & Grimes (2021) ===
Edwards & Grimes (2021) find that the similarities between the demonstrable groups of CMP languages are due to Papuan substrates and contact. They propose the following groups of languages in the area as primary branches of Austronesian. Several of these groups have been previously proposed, including by Blust:

- Bima–Lembata languages (Bima, Sumba–Flores & Flores–Lembata); marked by *#b > **w in a dozen roots
- Timor–Babar languages (extra-Ramelaic, Babar, Selaru); marked by *p > **h (often lost)
- Central Timor languages (Ramelaic); *ŋ > **ɡ (often devoiced to /k/)
- Aru languages; *j/R > **R, *z/y/i > **y (often with fortition to [dʒ])
- Tanimbar–Bomberai languages (Kei–Tanimbar, Teor-Kur, Irarutu–Nabi & Bedoanas–Erokwanas); *z/d > **d (later > [n] in some); *j > /r/ in some words; *-ay/-aw > **-a; *p > /f/
- Sula–Buru languages (incl. Ambelau); *R > /h/, *-ay/-aw > /a/, *j > split zero ~ /l/; plus morphology & lexicon such as *dama 'eye'
- Ambon–Seram languages (Nunusaku); *ŋ/n > /n/, *l/d/z/j/R > mostly **l
- Seram Laut languages (tentative); *-ay/-aw > /a/, *ə > /a/ in final syllables
  - Banda
  - East Seram
  - Eastern Islands (Seram Laut proper: Geser, Kowiai)

Seram Laut, apart from Kowiai, was first proposed by Collins (1986). It is distinguished from Ambon–Seram to the west in its reflexes of *j, *R, *-aw, and from Tanimbar–Bomberai to the east in *j and *z, but is only weakly defined as a unit. Its three branches are however well defined.

Edwards & Grimes (2021) further propose that the Taliabo languages, generally held to be part of Central Maluku, are actually Celebic (specifically, Saluan–Banggai).
