= Tetun people =

Ethnic group in Timor

Tetun, Belu (Tetun)
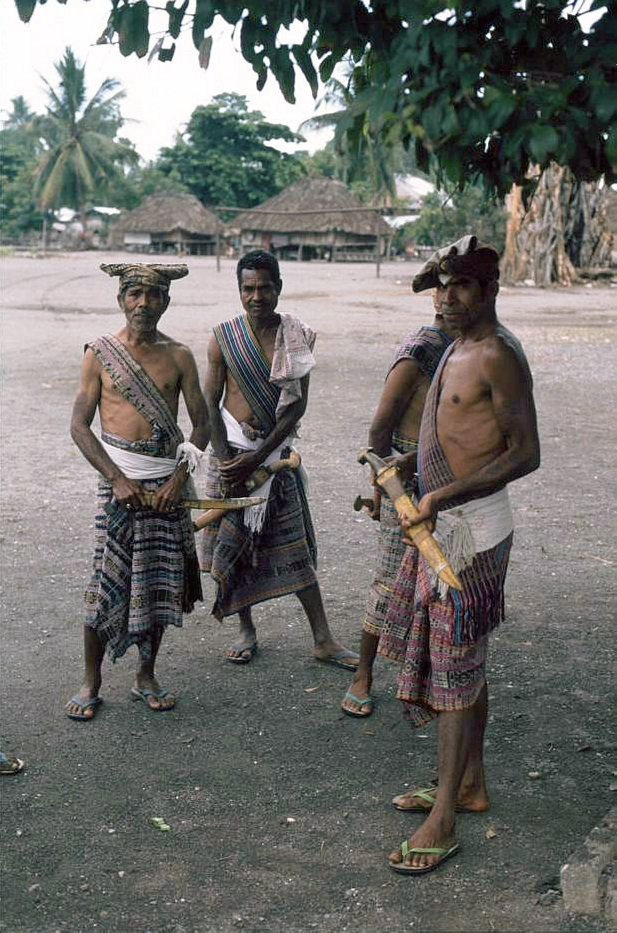
- Three Tetun men in Suai, East Timor wearing traditional clothing (2003).

Total population
- 950,000 (2015)

Regions with significant populations
- Indonesia: 500,000
- Timor-Leste: 450,000

Languages
- Tetun (native), Indonesian, Kupang Malay and Portuguese

Religion
- Christianity (predominantly Catholicism in both West and East Timor with significant minorities profess Protestantism in West Timor), Traditional religion

Related ethnic groups
- Atoni; Bunak; Mambai

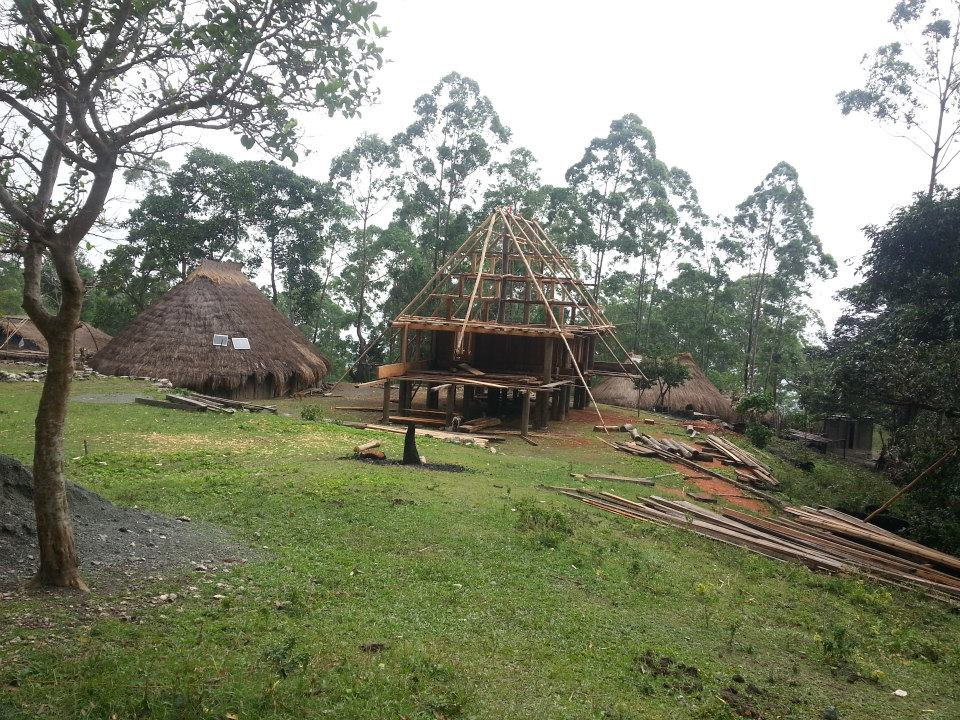
Tetun cottage in Dato Rua.

The Tetun, also known as Belu in Indonesia, are an ethnic group that are the indigenous inhabitants of the island of Timor. This ethnic group inhabits the Belu Regency and Malaka Regency in Indonesia and most of East Timor. Their language is called Tetun, which is part of the Austronesian language family. Apart from the island of Timor, this ethnic group is also found in Jakarta, Indonesia.

== Overview ==
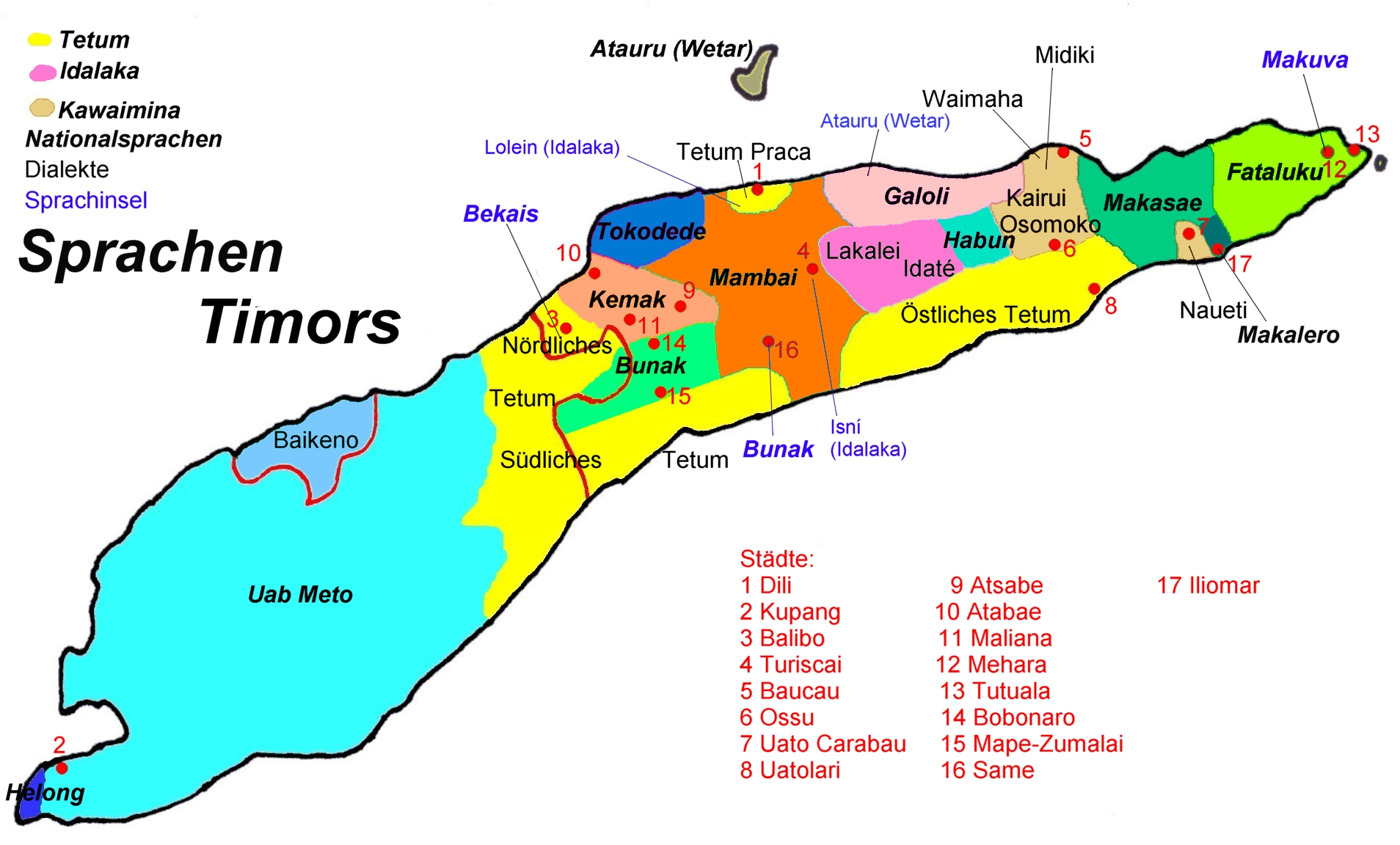
Language map of the island of Timor.

The Malayo-Polynesian Tetun form the largest ethnic group in East Timor with approximately 450,000 people and the second largest in West Timor with 500,000 people. They only migrated in the 14th century, when according to their records, the Tetun people came from Malacca. First they settled in the centre of the island and pushed the Atoni Meto to the western part of Timor. They then advanced further east and founded four kingdoms, of which Wehali was the most powerful. Likewise, their language became the lingua franca in the centre and east of the island. Even today, Tetuns live in the centre of the island on both sides of the border and on the southeastern coast.

The Tetun speak various dialects of Tetun. Tetun Prasa is the official language of East Timor alongside Portuguese. In East Timor alone, over 432,766 people speak Tetun as their first language (2015). Of the different dialects, 361,027 East Timorese stated that Tetun Prasa is their mother tongue, 71,418 mentioned Tetun Terik, and 321 mentioned Nanaek (2015).

The historical exonym Belu means 'friend' or 'protector'. Therefore, the eastern part of the island of Timor was called Belu during colonial times.

In contrast to other Tetun speakers, the "Tetun Terik Fehan" are matriarchally organised, which is otherwise only the case in Bunak and Galoli in East Timor. The Tetun Terik Fehan ethnic group lives in Manufahi, Cova Lima, Bobonaro and Manatuto.

== Origins ==
See also: Lulik

Among the Tetun Terik of Viqueque, it is believed that the first humans emerged from two orfices or vaginas, "Mahuma" and "Lequi Bui", emerging on the ground by climbing sacred tendrils. Therefore, among the Tetun Terik, the door of the house is traditionally referred to as the vagina and the inside is called WOMB, the women's room. According to their beliefs, the Tetun Terik universe, which is divided into the underworld and the upper world, is connected through a woman's vagina. The lower or sacred world is defined as feminine, dominated by women, while the secular and masculine upper world is occupied by men. According to their beliefs, the two worlds must be united, otherwise infertility, disease and death will threaten.

Based on stories that have been passed down from generation to generation, it is believed that the Tetun ethnic group originally came from Malacca on the Malay Peninsula, then moved to several places before finally arriving on the island of Timor, namely in the eastern part of the island. This story is also believed to be the origin of the founding of the Kingdom of Malaka in West Timor, which is one of the kingdoms led by the Tetun ethnic group.

== Culture ==
=== Traditional dance ===
One of the traditional dances of the Tetun ethnic group is the Likurai dance, which is danced by women to welcome guests or fighters returning from war.

=== Wedding ===
Tetun women who are and have been married traditionally wear tattoos with certain motifs that symbolise their social status. Tetun brides and grooms also have traditional clothing equipped with headdresses, fabrics, necklaces, studs, and other jewellery with distinctive patterns and meanings.

== See also ==
- Tetun language
- Culture of East Timor
- Atoni
- Kemak people
