= Matai =

Matai may refer to:

== Geography ==
- Matai, Egypt, a city in the governorate of Al Minya in Egypt
- Matai, Maucatar, a city and suco in Timor-Leste
- Matai, New Zealand, a locality in the Matamata-Piako District of New Zealand
- Matai, Tanzania, a town and administrative seat of Kalambo District, Tanzania
- Matai, West Coast, a locality in the Grey District of New Zealand
- Matai River, in Odisha and West Bengal states of India

== Plants ==
- Prumnopitys taxifolia (mataī), a tree endemic to New Zealand
- Eleocharis dulcis, the Chinese water chestnut

== People ==
- Jakub Matai (born 1993), Czech ice hockey winger
- Steve Matai (born 1984), New Zealand rugby league player
- Matai Smith (born 1977), New Zealand television presenter

== Other uses ==
- HMNZS Matai (T01), a Royal New Zealand Navy ship
- Matai (title), a chief in the faʻamatai system of the Samoa Islands

== See also ==
- Mattai (disambiguation)
