= Bunak people =

Ethnic group in central Timor

Bunak people Bunaq / Buna' / Bunake / Búnaque / Búnaque / Mgal / Gaiq / G Eq / Gai / Marae
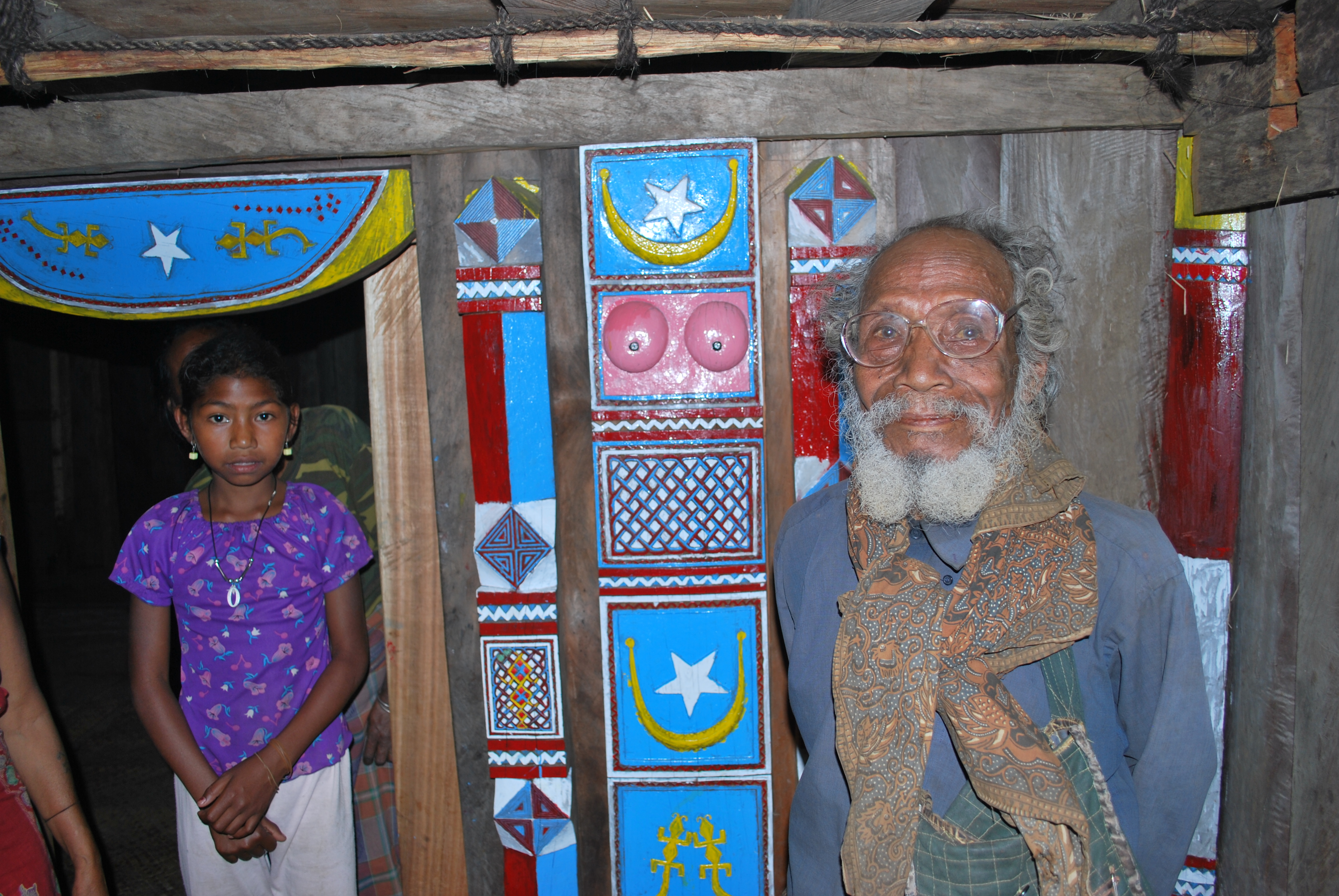
- Holy House in Fatuc Laran, Lactos, Cova Lima District, East Timor where 90% of the population are Bunak people.

Total population
- 76,000

Regions with significant populations
- Timor
- East Timor: 55,837 (2010)
- Indonesia (West Timor): 23,000

Languages
- Bunak, Indonesian, Kupang Malay, Tetum, Portuguese

Religion
- Animism (originally), Catholic (predominantly)

Related ethnic groups
- Papuan people

The Bunak (also known as Bunaq, Buna', Bunake) people are an ethnic group that live in the mountainous region of central Timor, split between the political boundary between West Timor, Indonesia, particularly in Lamaknen District and East Timor. Their language is one of those on Timor which is not an Austronesian language, but rather a Papuan language, belonging to the Trans–New Guinea linguistic family. They are surrounded by groups which speak Malayo-Polynesian languages, like the Atoni and the Tetum.

According to Languages of the World (Voegelin and Voegelin, 1977), there were about 100,000 speakers of the language, split evenly between the two nations.

== Settlement area ==
Today's settlement area of the Bunak people is located in the mountains of central Timor, ranging from the East Timorese town of Maliana in the north to the Timor Sea in the south, where both the Bunak and the Tetun communities often live side by side in coexistence. The Bunak people are isolated linguistically and socially, since the adjacent Kemak people to the north, the Mambai people in the east, the Tetun people in the south and west and the Atoni people speak to the west speak Malayo-Polynesian languages. Bunak is considered as being one of the Papuan languages, even though there are strong influences from the neighboring languages. The other Timorese Papuan languages are spoken in the east of Timor. Because of the language diversity in the region, the Bunak people are able to speak at least one of the Malayo-Polynesian languages fluently (in East Timor, Tetum is the lingua franca), while their surrounding neighbors rarely learn the Bunak language. In the hard-to-reach mountains, the townships of the Bunak people are relatively isolated from their neighboring communities. In East Timor, their area expands to the west of Manufahi District and in West Timor (Indonesia) towards the east of the Belu Regency and Malaka Regency.

The Bunak people of East Timor live mainly in places like Bobonaro and Lolotoe in the town of Bobonaro District, Tilomar Subdistrict and Zumalai in the municipality of Cova Lima District, Cassa in the municipality of Ainaro District, and Betano and Same in the municipality of Manufahi District. In the western border area of Cova Lima District, the Bunak people form a minority among the Tetun people. However, many townships are mixed. Between Fohoren and the coast south of Suai mixed townships of Tetun and Bunak people are found. A total of 55,837 East Timorese speak the Bunak language as their native language.

In the eastern regions of West Timor, the Bunak people in Belu Regency form the majority in Lamaknen and South Lamaknen districts, and a minority in Riahat district in the southeast. Similarly, in the southeast of West Timor, the Tetun people form the majority. Individual Bunak settlements can be found among Tetun villages in the Rai Manuk district of Belu Regency, Kobalima, East Kobalima and East Malaka district of Malaka Regency. The westernmost Bunak settlements are Haroeh (Sanleo Administrative village, East Malaka district) and Welaus (North Lakekun Administrative village, Kobalima district). In the northwest are the isolated Bunak villages of Faturika, Renrua (both in Rai Manuk district) and Babulu (Kobalima district). To the east Bunak townships lie along the road to the Alas and South Alas Administrative village of East Kobalima district at the border with East Timor.

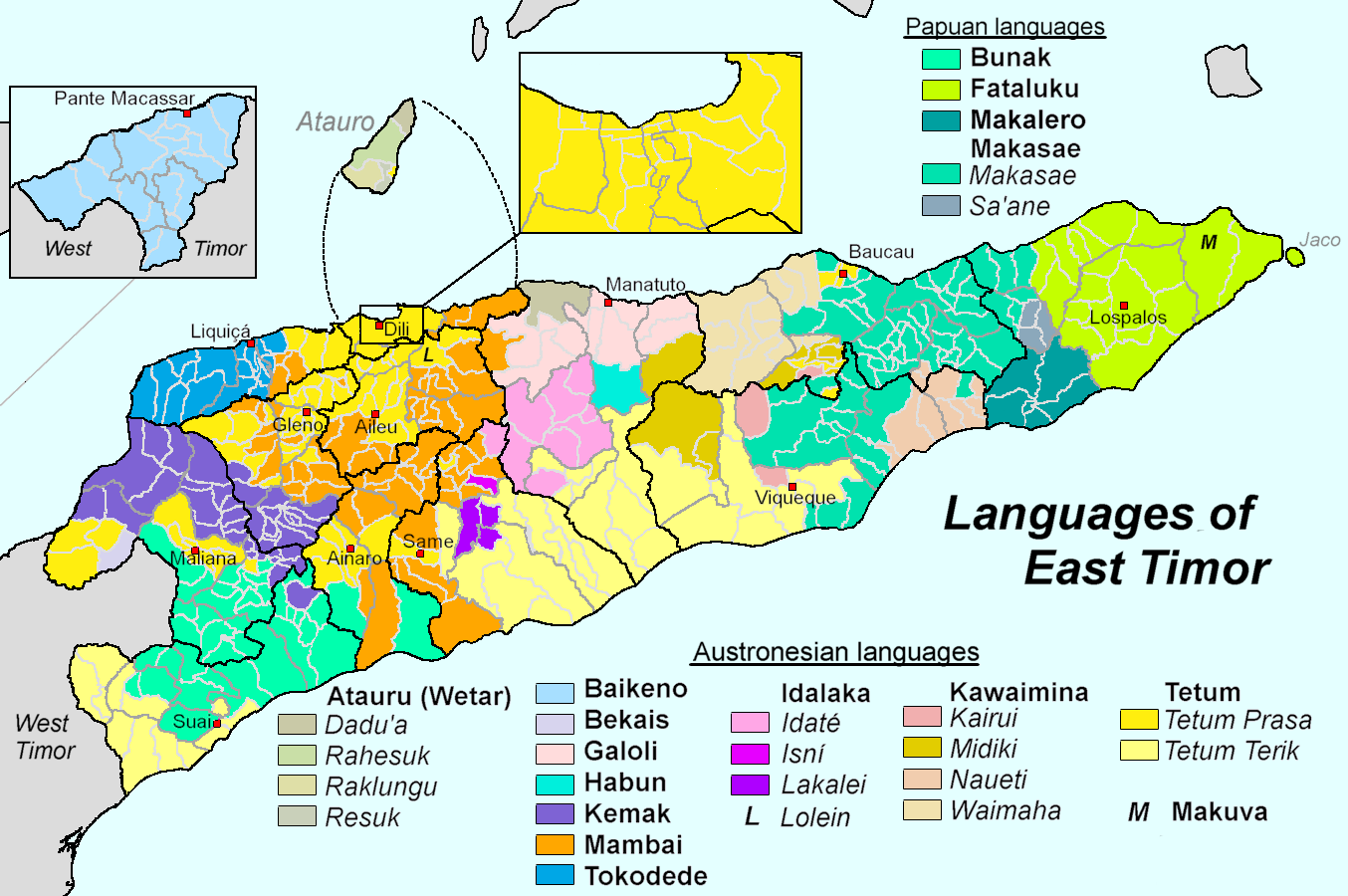
The largest language groups in the Sucos of East Timor.

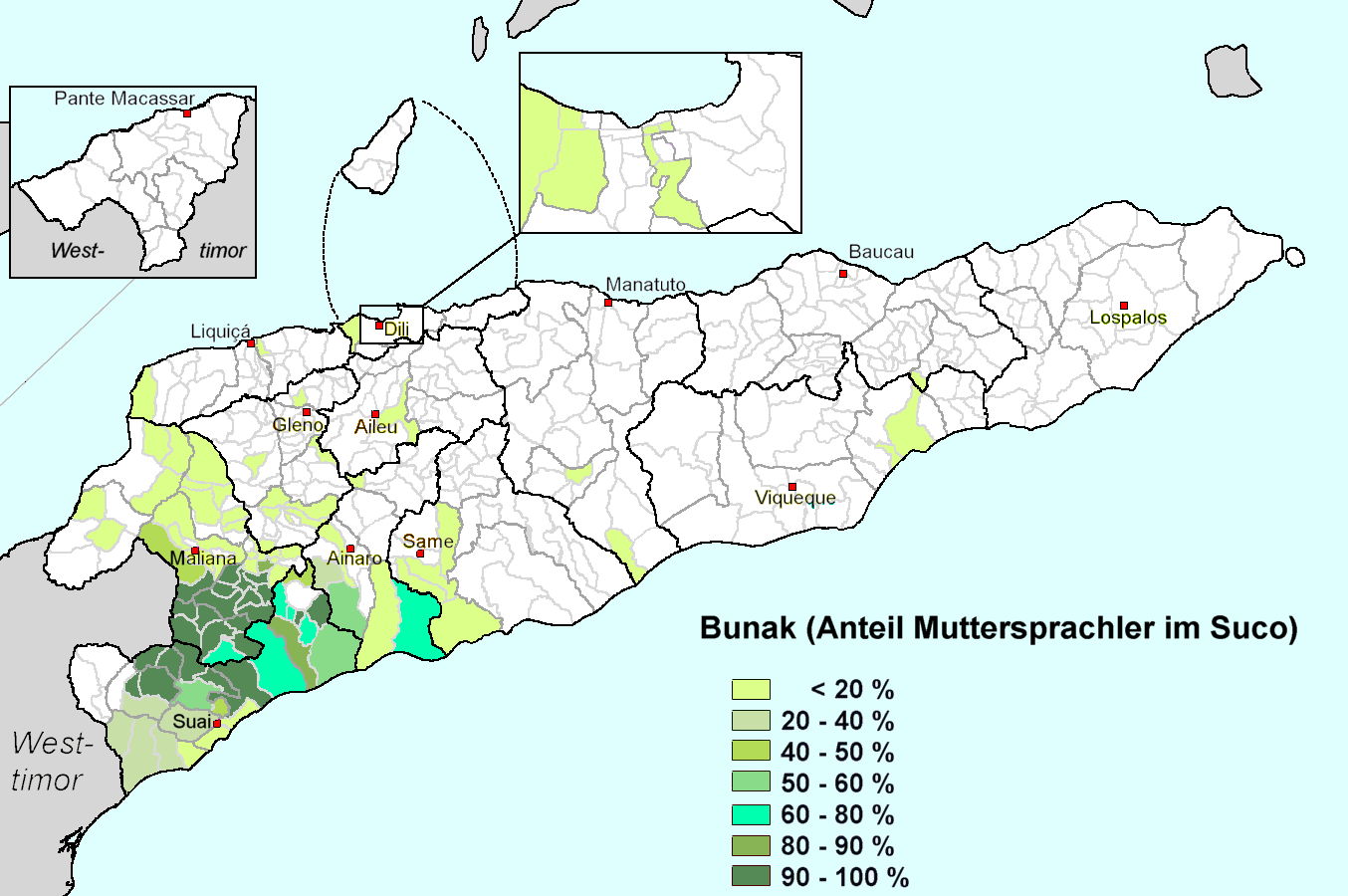
Percentage of Bunak native speakers in Sucos of East Timor.

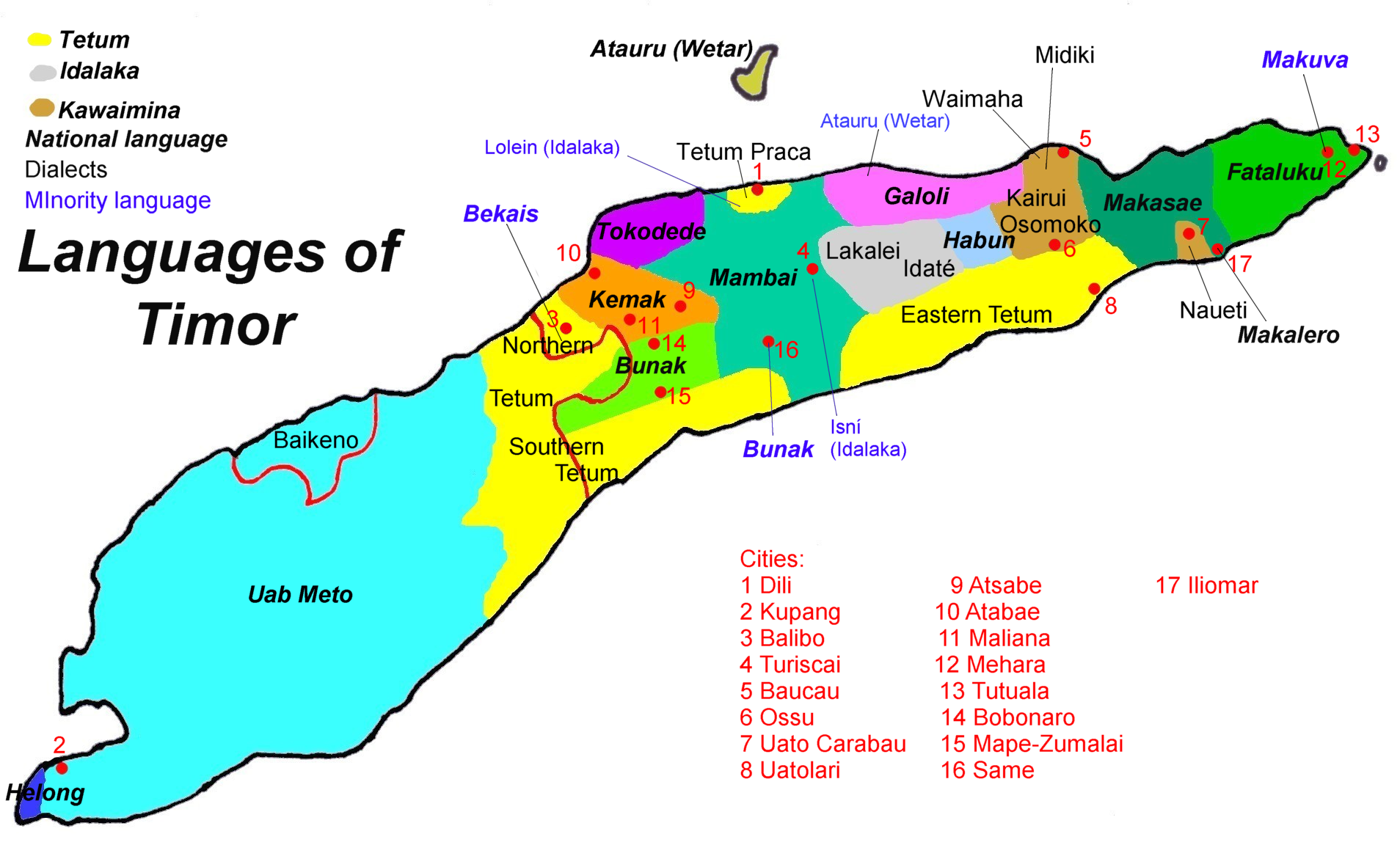
Overview map of Timor's languages.

== History and expansion ==
=== Mythical origins ===
According to legend, there was once a man named Mau Ipi Guloq who first domesticated the water buffalo. Together with his brother Asa Pharan, he one day caught two sows, which turned into women. His brother, however, claimed both women for himself, which eventually led Mau Ipi Guloq to part with him after a fight. One day a crow disturbed his buffalo, and so Mau Ipi Guloq shot a golden arrow at the bird with a golden blowpipe that he had borrowed from his brother. The crow flew with the arrow and Mau Ipi Guloq followed her into the underworld, where he met her sick ruler. Mau Ipi Guloq offered his help and discovered that his golden arrow was stuck in the ruler. He exchanged it with a bamboo arrow, which he soaked in his betel pouch. The ruler of the underworld was restored to health and gave Mau Ipi Guloq two oranges from a tree in the Underworld that turned into princesses. Asa Pharan asked his brother to exchange one of his wives for one of the princesses. But when he refused, Asan Paran threw Mau Ipi Guloq into a ravine and killed him. However, Mau Ipi Guloq's wives found him and brought him back to life by using an oil from the Underworld. He returned home healthy and brought back to his youth again; his brother also asked for a bath in the oil in order to be young again. Mau Ipi Guloq's wives heated the oil bath so much that Asa Pharan was scalded and died. Mau Ipi Guloq also married his brother's wives and became one of the main ancestors of the Bunak people.

=== Overview ===
Just as with any other Timorese ethnic group, there was originally no written tradition. All history and traditions were passed in by word of mouth until the coming of European colonization. Rich traditions do exist among the Timorese, especially the Bunak people. These narrative traditions are recited with repetition, rhyme and alliteration. This helps the performer remember the verses.

In general, it is assumed that Melanesians migrated to Timor around 3000 BC, to be partially displaced by later Proto-Malayo-Polynesian groups from 2500 BC. Some claim that the Fataluku people might have reached Timor from the east only after the Austronesians and that they were repressed or assimilated. There has been speculation of such a scenario even with the Makasae language. In the case of the Bunak people, however, there are only place names of Papuan linguistic origin in the homeland country, thus the Bunak people must have settled here before the Austronesians.

Moreover, as the Bunak people have common non-Austronesian vocabulary with the Fataluku language, Makasae language and Makalero language, the existence of a Proto-Timor-Papuan language, from which all the Papuan languages of Timor originate, had been postulated.

The present area of the Bunak people is the result of different migrations. Due to population growth, the Bunak people were forced to expand again and again to find new arable land. External influences also led to groups having to flee as well as forced resettlement.

Portuguese colonization began on Timor Island in the 16th century, while in the middle of the 18th century the Dutch extended their influence into the area of the Bunak people, so that it was divided into two sections, comprising a Western Dutch and an Eastern Portuguese sphere of interest. However, European rule remained predominantly nominal, with rule exercised by local traditional rulers. It was only in the early 20th century that the two colonial powers succeeded in building up a real colonial administration.

In the Second World War the Japanese occupied Timor from 1942 to 1945, ruling it as a single entity. There was fighting with Australian guerrilla commandos, with the aid of some Portuguese as well as many Timorese.

After the war, the west became part of Indonesia, while the east remained a Portuguese colony until 1975. When the Portuguese departed from Timor, the Indonesians first occupied the border region of East Timor. Nine days after the declaration of the Independence of East Timor, a full invasion followed, and a 24 year long struggle for independence. The civilian population fled the invasion into the wilderness, to only later have to gradually surrender to the invaders; it was not until 1979 that the last of the Bunak people living in the forests were forced to capitulate.

It was not until 1999 that Indonesia withdrew, and after three years of administration by the United Nations in East Timor did East Timir finally regain independence. however, the Bunak people and their homeland continued to be divided by the colonial border.

Since independence, more and more people from rural areas have moved to the capital, Dili, including many of the Bunak people. Many took up residence according to their geographical origin. Bunak speakers live in the west of the city in Comoro, Fatuhada and Bairro Pite, as well as in the city center in Suco Gricenfor, Acadiru Hun, Suco Santa Cruz and Suco Lahane Oriental. In 2006 there was unrest in the county, started mainly by East Timorese from Firaku and Kaladi. Bunak people belonging to the Kaladi were also involved in the conflict. In Dili, for example, there was confrontation between the Bunak people from Bobonaro District and Ermera District and Makasae people from Baucau District and Viqueque District for dominance in the market place.

=== Heartland ===
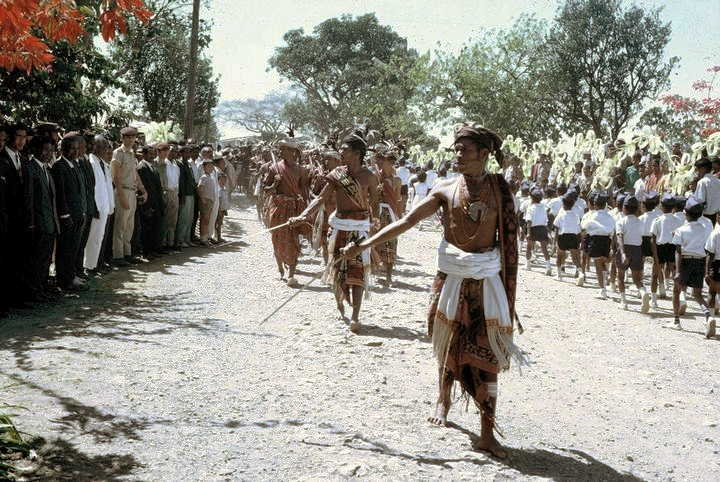
A Company of Moradores parade in Bobonaro, circa 1968-1970.

The heartland of the Bunak is located in the middle east of the East Timorese area of Bobonaro and north east of the municipality of Cova Lima District. Here is the only place where place names of Bunak origin are to be found, while in other areas inhabited by the Bunak there are also place names of Austronesian origin. Bunak settlements in bordering territories only have Austronesian place names. This indicates that the original homeland of the Bunak people lies in the center of the territory where the Bunak now cover.

In the Bunak language there are influences from Kemak and somewhat less from Mambai. From this we can conclude that the Bunak also had contact with the Mambai people and Kemak people in the past.

In the northeast, the Bunak people refer to themselves and their language as Gaiq or Gaeq, which is likely to derived from Mgai; the Kemak name for the Bunak people. According to Bunak oral traditions, they formerly belonged to the former kingdom of Likusa (Likosa), which once existed in the region of the Tokodede and Kemak people, which explains the adoption of anAustronesian name of the Bunak people. as well as the strong linguistic influence of the Kemak language on the Bunak language. In Marobo (Atsabe Administrative Post) and Suco Obulo, the Kemak people intermingled with the Bunak people, leading to cultural differences between the Kemak people on this side compared to the neighbouring Kemak people of Atsabe.

=== Between Maliana, Lamaknen and Maucatar ===
According to Bunak folk history in the northwest, they originally migrated from the east to the region south of Maliana and the present Indonesian districts of Lamaknen and Raihat. There they mingled peacefully with the local peoples, these being, according to source, the local Tetun or Atoin Meto people. The existing village names of Austronesian origin support these accounts. Legends of the Bunak people from the upper Lamaknen district, however, report that their forefathers had either expelled or killed the Melus (Timor) people when they came into the region. Research so far has not clarified whether the Melus were Tetun, Atoin Meto or another people. Investigations of the Bunak dialects suggest that the Bunak from the northeast and southwest met and settled in Lamaknen district. According to oral tradition, the region around Lamaknen district was an autonomous region of the Wehali Tetun people, bordering on the kingdom of Likusa. This influence can still be seen today as the Lamaknen dialect uses loanwords for ritual formulations from Tetum language.

In 1860 the region around Maucatar became a Dutch enclave, while the surrounding area was claimed by Portugal. The borders of the enclave coincided with the borders of the local Bunak kingdoms. The area now belongs to the Sucos of Holpilat, Taroman, Fatululic, Dato Tolu and Lactos. The territory of the then enclave of Maucatar is still inhabited by a large majority of Bunak. However, there are also Tetun place names. Therefore, it is assumed that the Bunak immigrated to this region and largely replaced the local Tetun, who today form a small minority.

In 1897 there were several battles around Lamaknen District areas between the northeastern kingdom of Lamaquitos (Lamakhitu) and the southern Lakmaras kingdom, which had as coalition partners the Bunak in the southwest. The end of this last traditional conflict between the indigenous kingdoms of the region has meant that the Bunak people in Lamaknen district have since gradually left their fortified villages on high ground and built houses close to water supplies. Spread out over a larger area, the clan members now only come to their clan houses to perform ceremonies.

As a result of the various territorial shifts between the Bunak kingdoms, however, the border between the two colonial powers of Portugal and the Netherlands remained a long-standing issue and was the subject of lengthy negotiations. In Lakmaras District, there were several deaths in the same year in clashes between Dutch and Portuguese troops. The Dutch claim to Maucatar was justified by Lakmaras sovereignty, which created a link to Maucatar. Meanwhile, Lakmaras had become subject to the kingdom of Lamaquitos, and this was part of the Portuguese sphere of power established by the Treaty of Lisbon in 1859. Maucatar would have failed as a Portugal enclave, according to the agreements that were already in place. On the other hand, the state of Tahakay (Tahakai, Tafakay, Takay; now in southern Lamaknen district) belonging to Portugal had subsequently become part of Lamaknen district. Tahakay, however, belonged to the Portuguese sphere of influence, while Lamaknen district belonged to the Dutch. Portugal opposed this loss in the negotiations of 1902, and therefore demanded the entire Dutch territories in the center of Timor. A compromise was reached with The Hague Convention of October 1, 1904: Portugal was to receive Maucatar, in exchange for the Portuguese enclave Noimuti in West Timor, and the border areas of Tahakay, Tamira Ailala and Tamiru Ailala of Lamaknen District. Portugal respected the treaty until 1909, but then there was a dispute over the border crossing on the eastern border of Oecusse District. In 1910, the Netherlands took advantage of the overthrow of the Portuguese monarchy in order to regain Lakmaras with the help of European and Javanese troops.

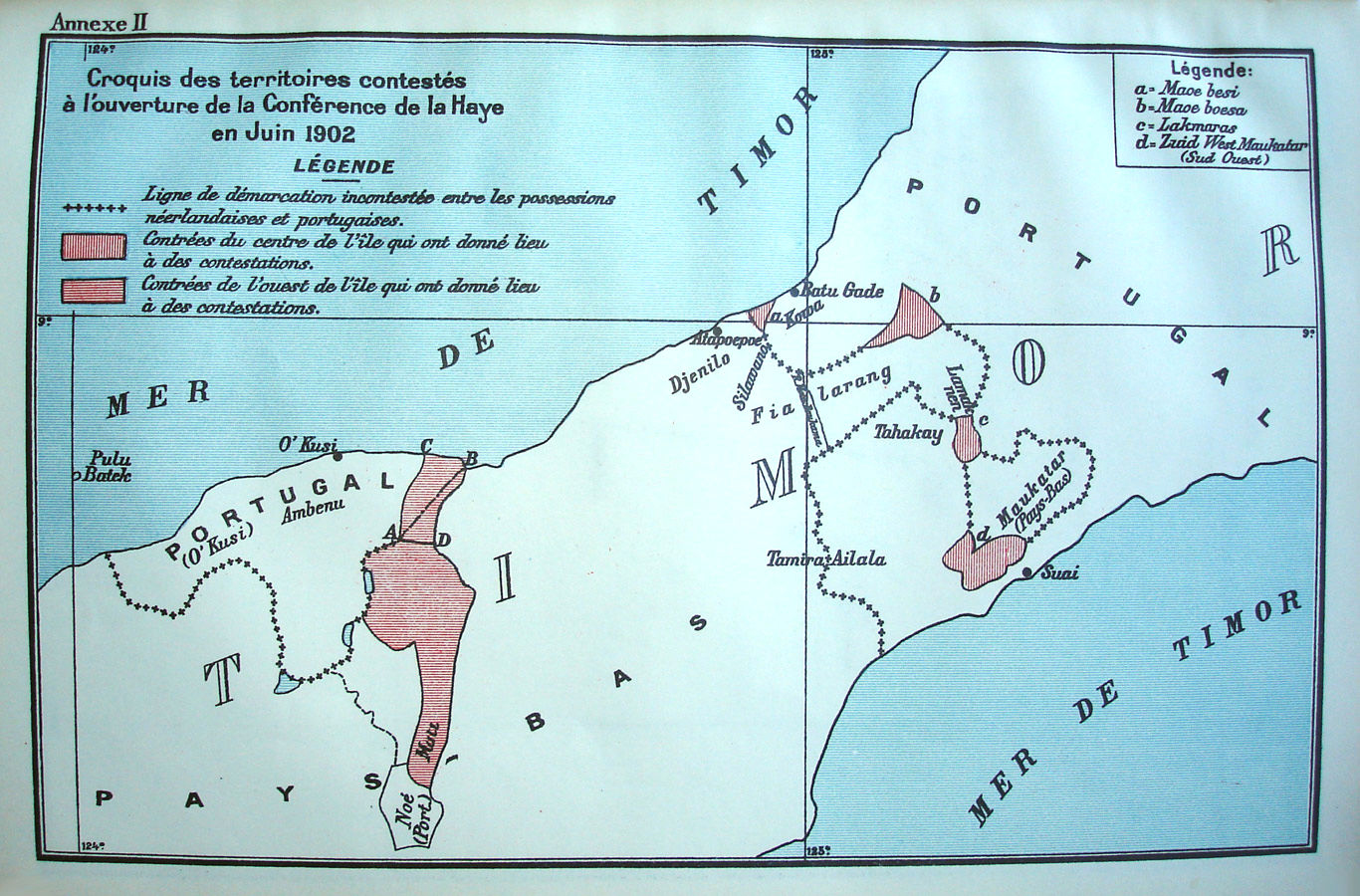
Map series referring to the PCA Award from 25 June 1914 belonging to the boundaries in the island of Timor.

In February 1911, following the 1904 Convention, Portugal tried to occupy Maucatar. However, in June, it faced a superior Dutch armed force from the Ambonese infantry, supported by European soldiers. On June 11, Portuguese troops occupied the territory of Lakmaras, but on July 18, Dutch and Javanese troops regained it. After the Dutch victory, the Portuguese then sought a peaceful agreement. They soon fell into trouble with a rebellion in the Manufahi District, which brought them to the negotiating table. On August 17, 1916, a treaty was signed in The Hague, which largely defined the borders between East and West Timor. On 21 November the agreed areas were exchanged. Noimuti, Maubisse, Tahakay and Taffliroe fell to the Netherlands, and Maucatar to Portugal, causing panic. Before the transfer to the Portuguese, 5,000 locals, mostly Bunaks, destroyed their fields and moved to West Timor. The population in Tamira Ailala would rather have stayed with Portugal, while in Tahakay the Dutch were welcomed.

It was only a few generations ago that Bunak established villages in the lowlands around Maliana, such as Tapo-Memo. Even today these villages still retain ritual relations with their native villages in the highlands.

After the Second World War, Bunak people from Lebos fled from the then Portuguese Timor to Lamaknen district. They were afraid of reprisals after collaborating with the Japanese during the Battle of Timor. The then ruler of Lamaknen, the Loroh (king) Alfonsus Andreas Bere Tallo, welcomed the arrival of the refugees, who founded the village of Lakus (in today's Desa Kewar).

As a result of the civil war between Augustine and UDT, refugees from East Timorese villages came to the border from August 1975 onwards. Among them were many Bunak people. They came from Odomau, Holpilat, Lela, Aitoun, Holsa, Memo and Raifun. At the end of August, the conflict crossed over to the other side of the border. Villages were destroyed, such as Henes in the Desa on the west side of the same name, which has not been rebuilt. The invasion of East Timor by Indonesia, which took place later in the following months, also caused more Bunak people to flee from their villages to escape the invasion. Some crossed the border, others sought shelter in the forests, where some of the people spent up to three years in hiding. Village communities were thus torn apart and resettled in different places until 1999. A similar fate befell the village of Abis in Lamaknen District. Although the inhabitants returned to their village after their escape in 1975, the village was burned down near the East Timor border. In 1999, other refugees also came to Lamaknen district from East Timor after the independence of East Timor and remain there to this day. There was fighting with the locals and in the process fields, huts and streets were destroyed.

=== Southwest of Cova Lima ===
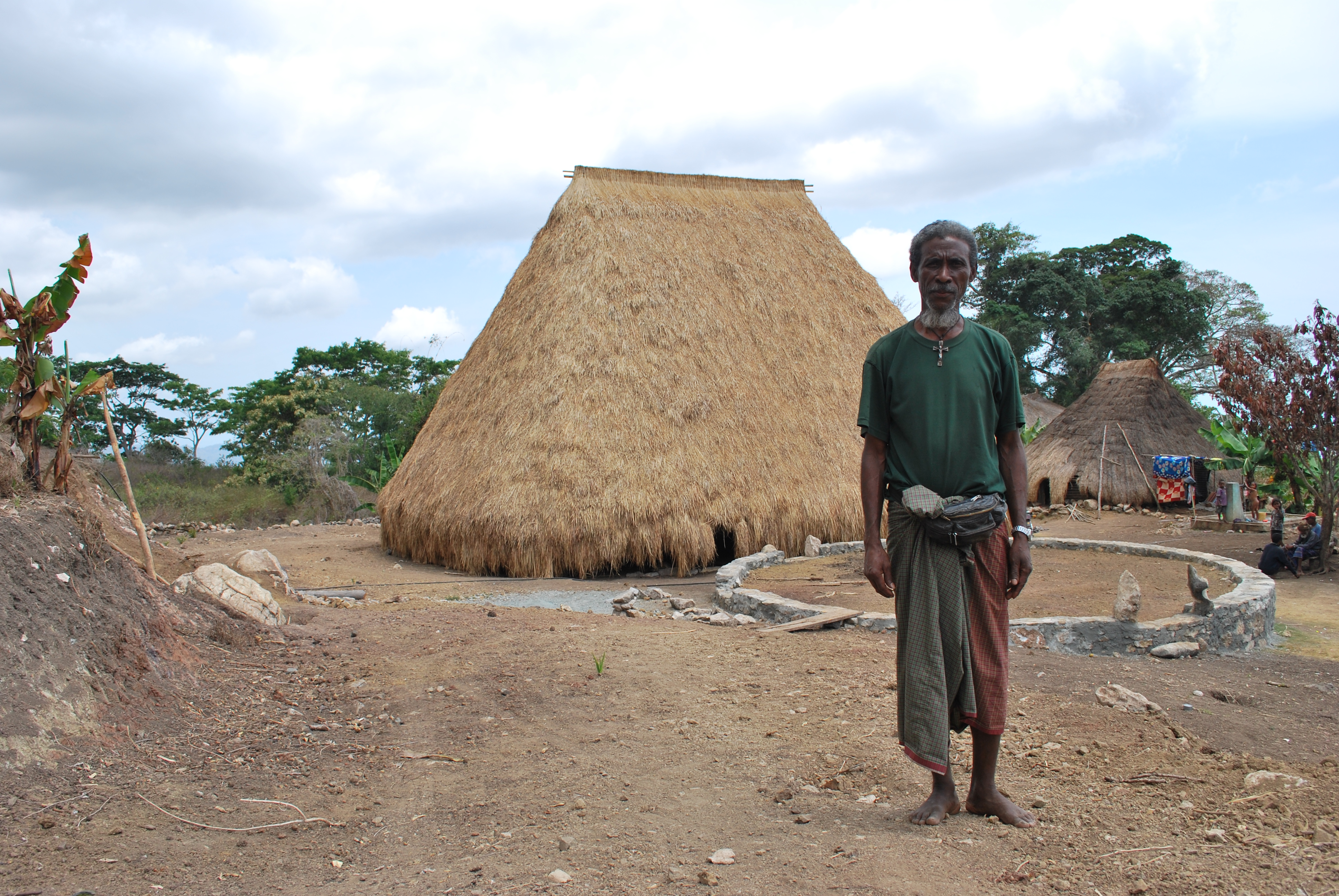
Man in Fatuc Laran, Lactos, Cova Lima District, East Timor, 2009.

Recently, Bunak people migrated to the southwest of Cova Lima District in two independent waves. The earlier group lives in slightly higher areas of Suco Beiseuc (formerly known as Foholulik, 2010: 30% Bunak) and Suco Lalawa (35% Bunak). They came in a large stream of refugees from the community of Bobonaro, when they fled in the Second World War before the arrival of the Japanese army. Guerrilla units of the Allies had operated against the Japanese of Lolotoe and the village of Bobonaro, and the Japanese troops carried out reprisals against the civilian population in Bobonaro in August 1942. This probably cost several tens of thousands of people their lives and drove others to flee.

The second wave are those Bunak people who settled in the lowlands between Suai and the border. They were forcibly resettled from northern Sucos in the Cova Lima District, such as Fatululic and Taroman, by the Indonesian occupation forces. The official reason was a development program for rice cultivation. However, in 1977, many East Timor peoples were forcibly removed from remote areas in order to cut support for Fretilin. The Indonesian army in East Timor set up so-called "Internment Camps", in which hundreds of thousands of civilians were interred.

=== Malaka and southern Belu ===
The Bunak of Namfalus village (Desa Rainawe, Kobalima District) originated in the same exodus of Bunak people in South Fohorem before the arrival of Japanese troops in the Second World War. Other Bunak people in this region are the descendants of the 5,000 refugees from Maucatar, who left the former Dutch enclave after the takeover by the Portuguese. The more recent Bunak people joined these villagers when they fled in 1975 and in 1999 when the violence in East Timor broke out.

The resettlement of the Maucatar Bunak people led to controversy with the local Tetun people, causing the Bunak to shift repeatedly. It was only in the 1930s that the administration succeeded in settling the refugees at their present places of residence. The Bunak people in these areas still trace their origin to certain places in Maucatar, such as those from Raakfao (Raakafau, Desa Babulu) in Fatuloro and those from Sukabesikun (Desa Litamali, Kobalima District) in Suco Belecasac. Despite the threat of assimilation to the neighboring Tetun people, they are still able to trace their origins.

=== Eastern Cova Lima ===
The Bunak settlements from Suai to Zumalai were also established only recently. The area was previously uninhabited. These relatively recent settlements also have connections to their places of origin. Thus, Beco village has a deep relationship with Teda village, east of Lolotoe, even though the migration was a few generations ago. Their dialect is close to that of the Lolotoe region, even if some of their vocabulary was taken from the southwestern dialect. Other settlements emerged only during the Indonesian occupation when all villages from the north along the southern coastal road around Zumalai were resettled. Their dialect is a Highlands dialect.

=== Ainaro and Manufahi ===
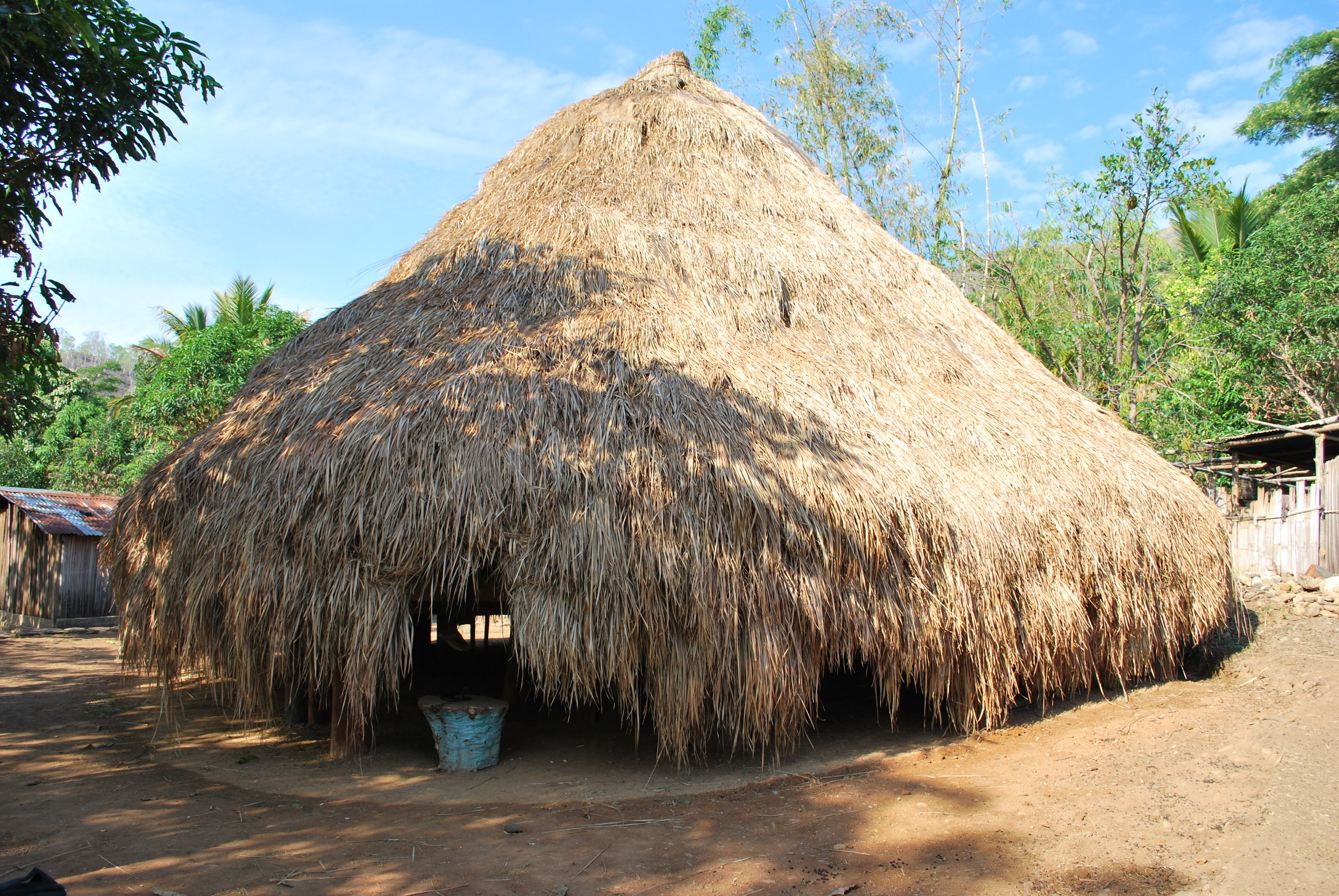
Holy House in Maununo, Suco Cassa, Ainaro Subdistrict, Ainaro District, East Timor.

Bunak people live among the Mambai people in the south of Ainaro District and in the south-west of Manufahi District. Speakers of the Bunak language in these districts recognize their origin from the north-eastern Bunak region. Through the close contact with the Mambai people, most of the Bunak people are bilingual in Mambai, which is a Malayo-Polynesian language; their language also shows influence from Mambai.

Maununo was a suco that consisted of only three villages during the Indonesian occupation. The population of Maununo is 60% Tetun, 30% Bunak and 10% Mambai. In Suco Cassa the Bunak people form 55% of the population, followed by the Tetun and a small minority of Mambai. Even in Fohoailiku the Bunak people represent the majority. According to oral traditions, the Bunak people of Fahoailiku originated from western Ainaro, which they left due to conflicts with other Bunak groups during the Portuguese colonial period. The linguistic characteristics of the three Bunak groups in Ainaro suggest a common origin.

There are accounts of their origin that are conflicting. While parts of the Bunak stated that they had only entered the region later, others claimed that they were the original inhabitants. However, all Bunak settlements have Australian names, which would indicate an originally Malayo-Polynesian peoples settlement. So are places with names that begin with Mau (Mau Nuno, Mau-Ulo, Maubisse); that is typical of settlement areas inhabited by the Mambai people, Kemak people and Tocodede people. In the heartland of the Bunak people, such naming does not occur. Other places with names that are clearly of Mambai origin, such as Suco Beikala, which means bei "grandparents" and kala "ancestors".

In addition to the three main groups of the Bunak people in Ainaro, there are two other smaller groups, which were moved from the region around Zumalai only during the Indonesian occupation. The first group lives in the villages of Civil (Sivil) and Lailima (both in Suco Cassa). The second group from the east of Suco Casa are two Bunak villages, Leolima and Hutseo (along with its subsequent offspring, Hutseo 2 village) are surrounded by vast Mambai settlements. The inhabitants of these four villages speak the northeast dialect, with the variations typical of Zumalai.

In Manufahi District there are four isolated Bunak villages. The oldest of them is Loti (Lotin) in the southeast of Suco Daisula. The Bunak people emigrated here from Suco Aiasa in 1891, after a conflict with the ruler of Bobonaro. According to oral traditions, the inhabitants of Suco Aiasa had killed the ruler's wife, whereupon Bobonaro requested assistance from the Portuguese in August 1891. After several battles some of the inhabitants of Suco Aiasa fled to Manufahi. They first settled somewhat further north of today's Loti, where they had only contact with Mambai people and Lakalei speakers. This resulted in a unique deviation and even change in meaning in the local Bunak dialect.

After the failed rebellion of Manufahi, a part of the Bunak people of Loti was moved by the Portuguese to the location of today's Loti. Others were settled in two new villages in Suco Betano. One of them is Bemetan as it is known in Mambai language or Il Guzu (meaning "black water") in Bunak language, and the second being Leoai (Leo Ai / Leouai). During the Indonesian occupation, Bunak people who remained in the old Loti was also relocated to the new Loti. These three villages share their own extraordinary dialect.

The fourth Bunak village in Manufahi is Sessurai (Sesurai) in Suco Betano, on the road between Loti and Leoai. According to their traditions, these Bunak people fled from the region around Zumalai to Manufahi during the Portuguese colonial period. Their dialect corresponds to that from Zumalai, but has taken over some words from the Bunak people of Loti.

== Culture ==
=== Social organization ===
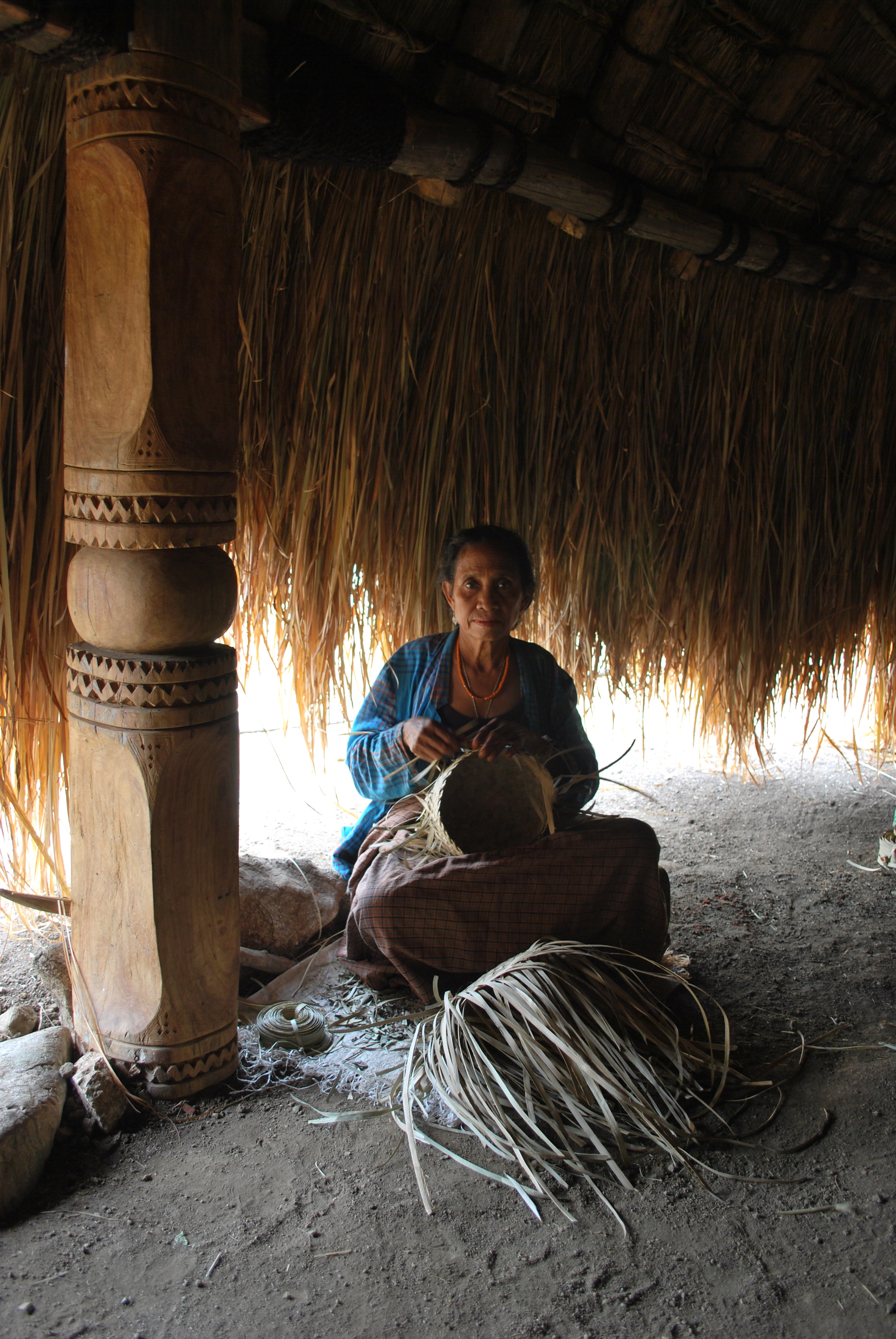
A woman weaving in Fatuc Laran, Lactos, Cova Lima District, East Timor.

The social isolation has also been a reinforced part of the reputation of Bunak people. They have been described as rough and aggressive by their neighbors. This characterization can also be found in a Bunak legend, in which Kemak people have long ears and the Bunak people have small ears. The metaphorical length of the ears in the Bunak people points to a short-tempered and impatient temperament, while the Kemak people are described as calm and patient.

Although Bunak and Atoin Meto people differ culturally, the social organization and the ecology of both cultures belong in the same context where both the cultures of Atoin Meto and Bunak people benefit from each other. The approach of the Bunak people from a cultural and linguistic point of view is so far that Louis Berthe described it in 1963 as a mixture of Papuans and Austronesian roots.

The smallest social unit in the Bunak society is the clan or the house, which for example, in the upper Lamaknen is called deu. Several clans live together in villages (tas). Each village has its own territory. The clans have a different status. The clans of the nobles are called sisal tul (meaning, bones piece). The name derives from a ritual in which the bones of an animal that was sacrificed belonging to the noble clan. The highest of the nobility houses belong to the clan of the "feminine" chieftain. This man decides in case of problems in the village. The second highest clan represents the "masculine" chieftain who takes care of the village's relations with the outside world. Other clans are the consultants of the village chefs. Despite their extensive power (oe nolaq), the two chiefs are subordinate to the ritual chief. This has a limited power (oe til) within the affairs of the clan. Together with one of his sisters, the ritual chief is also the guardian of the holy objects in the clan house. In Lamaknen the siblings are called "the man holding the black basket" (taka guzu hone mone) and the "woman holding the black basket" (taka guzu hone pana).

The different clans are connected to each other in the system of the malu ai. The malu clan are in this case in a partnership, the woman and feminine goods such as pigs and clothes, while from the ai baqa, clan receive wives and give masculine goods. This used to include gold, silver and water buffalo, now replaced by money and cattle. On ceremonial occasions, such as funerals or of the clan house repair, goods between are again malu and ai baqa replaced. However, women rarely leave their clan. In the majority of the Bunak family, a matrilineal system prevails for the succession. The man traditionally moves into the clan of the bride (Matrilocality), where the later children also grow up. The husband has to provide as a mane pou ("new man") his children and wife, but is not considered a family member. He also has no claims or rights over his wife and children, even if he had to pay a high bride price. In 1991 this was about US dollars 5,100. If the wife dies first, the widower must leave the village and even his own children, and return to his old home village. This may also be necessary through certain ceremonies. He is not allowed to take any valuable property, therefore he is dependent on the help of his clan and his family. He also does not receive the support from his own children as a clan. When the woman moves into an ai baqa clan, one speaks of the clipping of the woman from her clan. She is admitted to her husband's clan, where the family forms a new line of lineage (dil), establishing a new malu - ai baqa relationship. The children also belong to the clan of the father. Clans can maintain as much as fifteen malu relationships but there can never be more than three to six dil. They maintain their status in the further course of the mother line. The members of the dil lead the name of the maternal clan and keep their property and their sacred objects. In Ainaro, however, the influence of neighboring Mambai people has led to a patrilineal structure. Also here the Mambai and Bunak people share a common legend. Thus, the Bunak people from Mau-Nuno derive from the same mythical ancestral couple and the summit of the mountain from which they are derived has both a Bunak and a Mambai name.

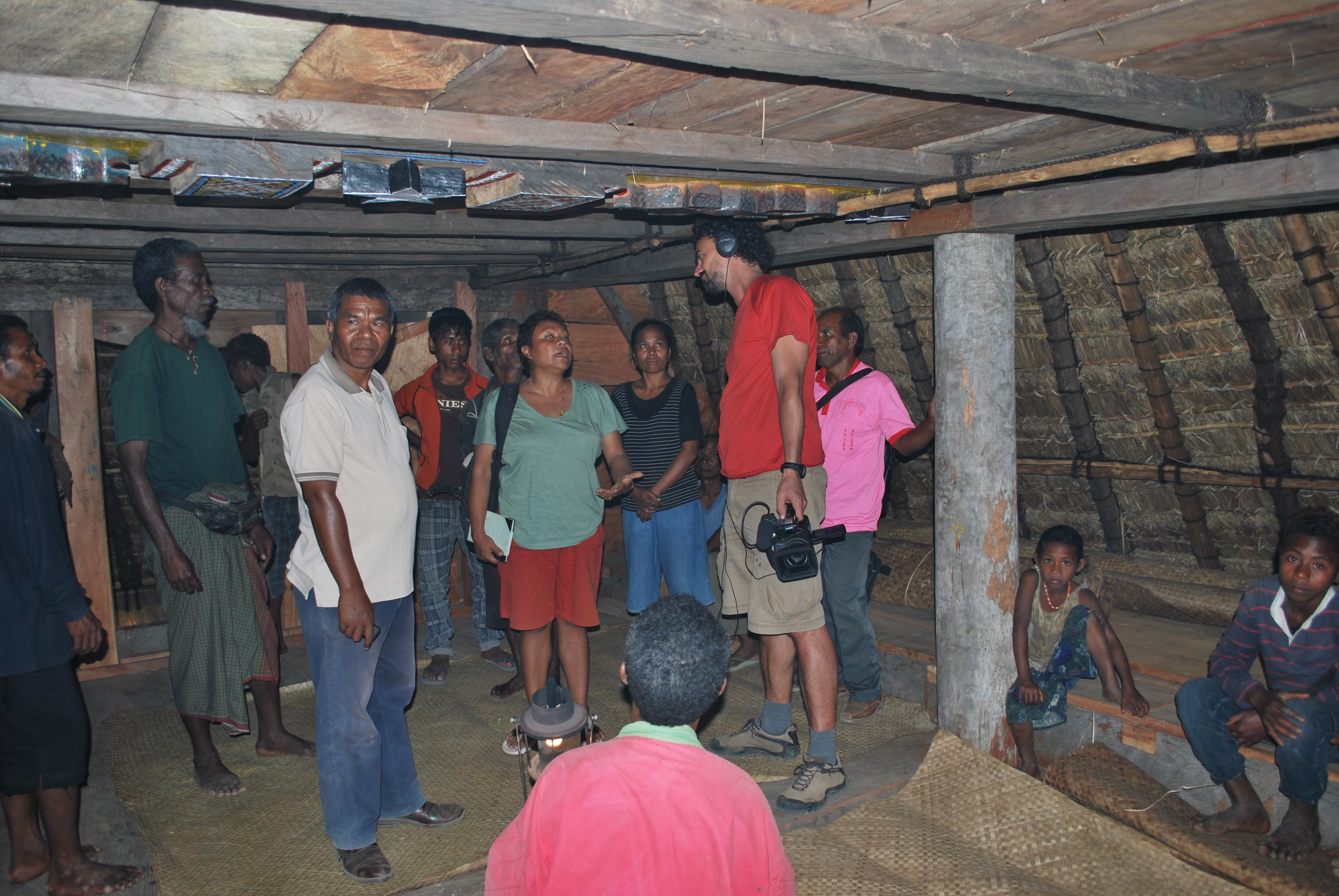
In a Holy House (Uma Lulik) in Fatuc Laran, Lactos, Cova Lima District, East Timor.

Holy objects are handed down by the men to his uterine nephew. In any case of the marriage type, the father can only pass on to the son the objects which he has acquired in the course of his life. Other holy objects belong to the entire clan. They are generally regarded as sources of life energy. They are kept in the clan houses, where only the guardians reside. Previously, all clan members lived together in single lineage or clan house. Sometimes, the guardians still have a young couple who would help them with the daily work. Every clan house has an altar that can be found both inside and outside the house. In the house is the altar on one of the two piles which carry the first beam (lor bul). Across the street is the fireplace. On the common altar of the village (bosok o op, meaning "altar and height") are aligned to all the clan houses' lor bul. The village altar (bosok o op) represents the vital energy of the inhabitants. It is also called pana getelmone goron'; meaning "root of women, leaves of men", a metaphor for vitality where leaves move and roots allow plants to absorb water. The longer the roots, the longer the plant lives. Bunak people wishes each other a long life by saying i etel legul (meaning "Let our roots be long") or i sth huruk (meaning "Let our roots be cool"). Cooling, in conjunction with water, symbolizes fertility; Heat is associated with danger and death. Other altars can be located at water sources, others were only used in the event of war.

=== Agricultural rites in Lamaknen ===
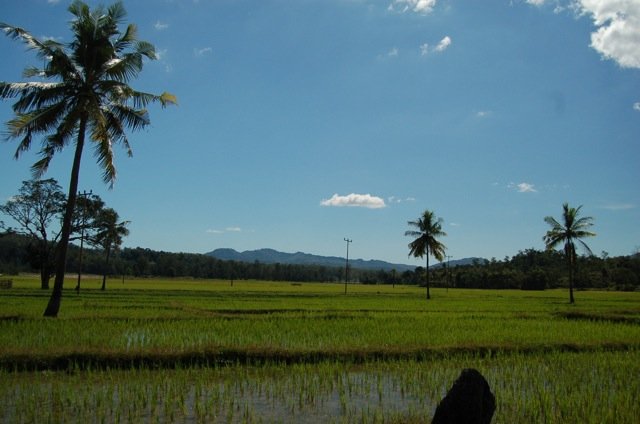
Rice fields in the subdistrict of Maliana, East Timor.

According to legend, when the Bunak people reached Lamaknen, they asked their ancestors in heaven for seeds so that they could work the land. On a field altar, Bei Suri; a man who had joined the Bunak people, was sacrificed and burned. Various parts of his body then appeared on the different plantations that the Bunak people had planted. Several traditional prose describes how various crops such as rice; which still the ceremonial food, were provided by parts of the hero's body. However, there are also versions that incorporate the corn into the legend, which today is the main food source of the Bunak people in Lamaknen. But this was only brought to Timor by the Europeans. The rain is also linked to the self-sacrifice of Bei Suri. After his death, he asked people not to cry anymore, and took the form of a bird that predicts the rain.

The researcher Claudine Friedberg explored the rituals of the Bunak people in Abis (Lamaknen) during the 1970s to the early 1980s and described in detail the ceremonies of the Bunak people in this region. However, the place no longer exists and a road now connects the region with the outside world, which previously could only be reached with horses at that time. Agriculture here is entirely dependent on the amount of monsoon that occurs. The reliability of sufficient rainfall is the critical moment of the agricultural calendar during the sowing season. It takes place in Lamaknen before the rain comes between October and December. The fields are prepared by means of slash-and-burn. Then the 'Lord of the Seeds' and the 'Rice Masters' lay down the dates for numerous ceremonies. The 'Lord of the Seeds' belongs to the clan to whom the legend is attributed to the sacrifice of Bei Suri. It is, however, none of the nobility houses. On the other hand, 'Rice Masters' are the guardians of the holy objects of certain, distinguished clans.

Before the sowing, a hunting takes place several days, in which the men usually take wild pigs. In the remaining time of the year, they will no longer hunt like they did. Wild game has become rare with the increase of population growth, so they beat around the countryside to prevent possible damage of their fields by wild animals. The prey is associated with the kukun, "the obscure ones". This refers to the local spirits of the deceased Melus who were once expelled by the Bunak people from the region. The kukun are the masters of heaven and earth (pan o muk gomo) and the masters of the prey. On the contrary, the living are the roman, the "clear ones". For the kukun there are small, inconspicuous altars from only a few stones in the surroundings that are scattered. About these muk kukun ("earth obscure") are the sites where the Bunak people make contact with the kukun spirits. The main altar stands near the village. In the evening of the first day of the hunt, the 'Lord of the Seeds' puts a liana around the wide cairn and binds its ends to two wooden stakes standing a few centimeters apart. The liana symbolizes the circling of the pigs, which can only flee through a narrow gate where the hunters are waiting for them.

On the following day, the Rice Masters sacrifice some betel nuts, some alcohol and feathers of a live chicken, to the muk kukun; which is in the selected hunting area, so that the 'Master of the Land' would surrender the wild pigs. At the same time, the 'Rice Masters' lie down in front of the altar and deceive themselves to sleep, so that the pigs are also to fall into a deep sleep. This makes it easier for the hounds to chase them. The booty of the first hunting day is brought back to the village in the evening, where a woman from the clan of the 'Lord of the Seeds' welcomes with betel just as one welcomes a guest. It is followed by "Welcome to the Smoke of Fire" (hoto boto hoso) ritual. The 'Lord of the Seeds', and the 'Rice Master' recite verses in reference to the seeds that were entrusted by the corpse of Bei Suri. One of the 'Master of the Word' sacrifices a cock with red feathers by killing him. The throat is not cut with a knife as it is usually done, to prevent severing ties with the "seed". The 'Lord of the Word' recites a welcome text and prays to the 'lord of the village altar'. This title refers to the Melus, who had originally erected the altar, and the first Bunak man who took it over. From the appendages of the cock is used predict about the upcoming planting season. The boiled cock is dissected and spread over small baskets of cooked rice. Some of them are offered to the altar and placed on its top. Then they are handed over to the clan of the female chief. Those baskets at the foot of the altar go to the Sabaq Dato, the clan of the "feminine chief" of the Melus. A basket is sacrificed at Bei Suri. This is the 'Lord of the Seeds'. The other baskets are distributed among the hunters.

On the third day of the hunt at night, the 'Lord of the Seeds' and the 'Rice Masters' bring the meat; which according to their belief contains the seeds of the future harvest, to the lataq altar at the edge of the village. This is done in silence, so as not to attract attention in carnivores. On the lataq, birds, insects and other animals are symbolically fed with rice and chicken to keep them away. In the afternoon of the third day, the various clans visit their graves and bring them fruits and special cakes. At the graves they meet with members of the respective malu clans that also bring fruits and cakes. After being presented to the deceased, the gifts are given to the ai baqa clan.

On the fourth day, after the last hunt, one last common ritual is performed. Women from all clans of the village bring in large baskets of cooked rice to the 'Lord of the Seeds' at the lataq altar. This is distributed to the hunters who have injured or killed a pig. It is a kind of compensation, because, contrary to the customary custom, they do not receive any part of the prey from this traditional hunting. The meat is consumed only by the 'Lord of the Seeds' and the rulers within the ritual circle. Exactly at this time the first heavy rain is expected to fall. It is in the experience of ritual leaders that the ritual and rain coincide on the same day and thus marks the success of the harvest. Every three years, the final ritual is even more complex. This period coincides with the three-year rhythm of the slash-and-burn. From the next day, the fields are sown after a piglet and a goat have been slaughtered at the respective field altar. The blood of the piglet is said to be cold and also to cool down the seeds. Coldness is a synonym for fertility for the Bunak people, while combining heat with death, danger, and struggle. The goat is said to carry the souls (melo) of the fallen trees to the hereafter on the top of their horns. Friedberg, however, noted in 1989 after a visit to the region that this ritual was no longer carried out at the field altars. The reason was that there was simply no one to sacrifice. Instead, a common cooling-down ritual of all village villagers was held at the village altar. The ritual for the souls of the trees was omitted, possibly because there was simply no more trees in the fields due to the short frequency of the slash-and-burns.

Seeds are being sown on the fields after it is directly slash-and-burned without being worked on. The digging-stick (nut) has an eight to ten centimeter large metal blade and it also the same tool used for weeding. Irrigated fields did not exist in Abis village, but in other parts of Lamaknen. These irrigation are prepared with the help of water buffaloes and cattle.

As long as the crops are not ripe, there are strict harvest prohibitions from kapitan and those supporting him, makleqat (meaning "to hear to see") are monitored. The kapitan himself is subordinate to the 'Master of the Firstfruits' (hohon niqat gomo), also known as the 'Master of the Germs, the Sandalwood and the Beeswax' (kosoq zobel turul wezun gomo). Sandalwood and beeswax were formerly important commodities whose production was under the control of the local rulers who protect the stocks. The Tobe (customary ritual leader with authority over land, forests, and water) of Atoin Meto people in Oecusse District also has a similar function as a resource manager. Kapitan and 'Master of the Firstfruits' came from the same clan, the house Sabaq Dato, at the Bunak people in Abis village.

Mangoes and candlenut are the first to become ripe. The entire harvest of both fruits is collected on the main square of the village. The clans of the male and female chieftains are the first to get their share of the mangoes, which is also larger than that of the others. Only the female chief receives a share of the candlenut. The rest is kept by the kapitan for general use.

== Notes ==
=== Bibliography ===
- Claudine Friedberg (1989), "Social relations of territorial management in light of Bunaq farming rituals", Bijdragen tot de Taal-, Land- en Volkenkunde / Journal of the Humanities and Social Sciences of Southeast Asia, 145 (4), Journal of the Humanities and Social Sciences of Southeast Asia: 548–563, doi:10.1163/22134379-90003246, ISSN 0006-2294
- Antoinette Schapper (2011), "Crossing the border: Historical and linguistic divides among the Bunaq in central Timor", Wacana, Journal of the Humanities of Indonesia, 13 (1), The Journal of Indonesian Humanities: 29
- Antoinette Schapper (2011), Andrew McWilliam & Elizabeth G. Traube (ed.), Land and Life in Timor-Leste, ANU E Press, ISBN 9781921862595
