= West Timor languages =

West Timor may refer to:

- The Austronesian Timor–Babar languages
- The Papuan Alor–Pantar languages plus Bunak
