= Zumalai =

City in Timor-Leste

Coordinates: 9°09′27″S 125°27′02″E

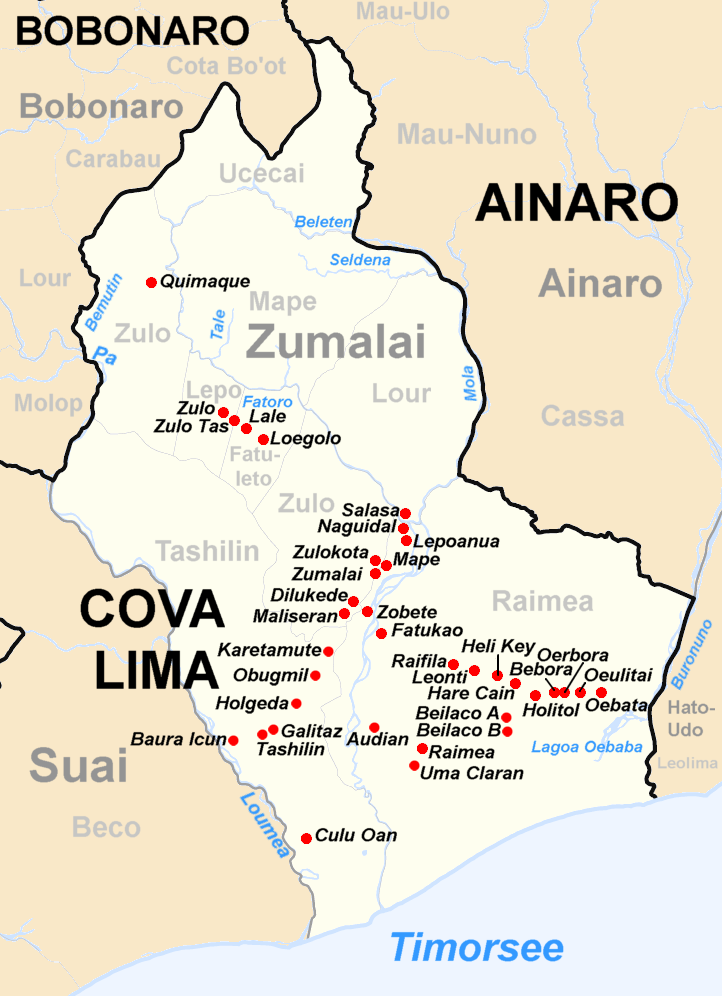
Subdistrict of Zumalai

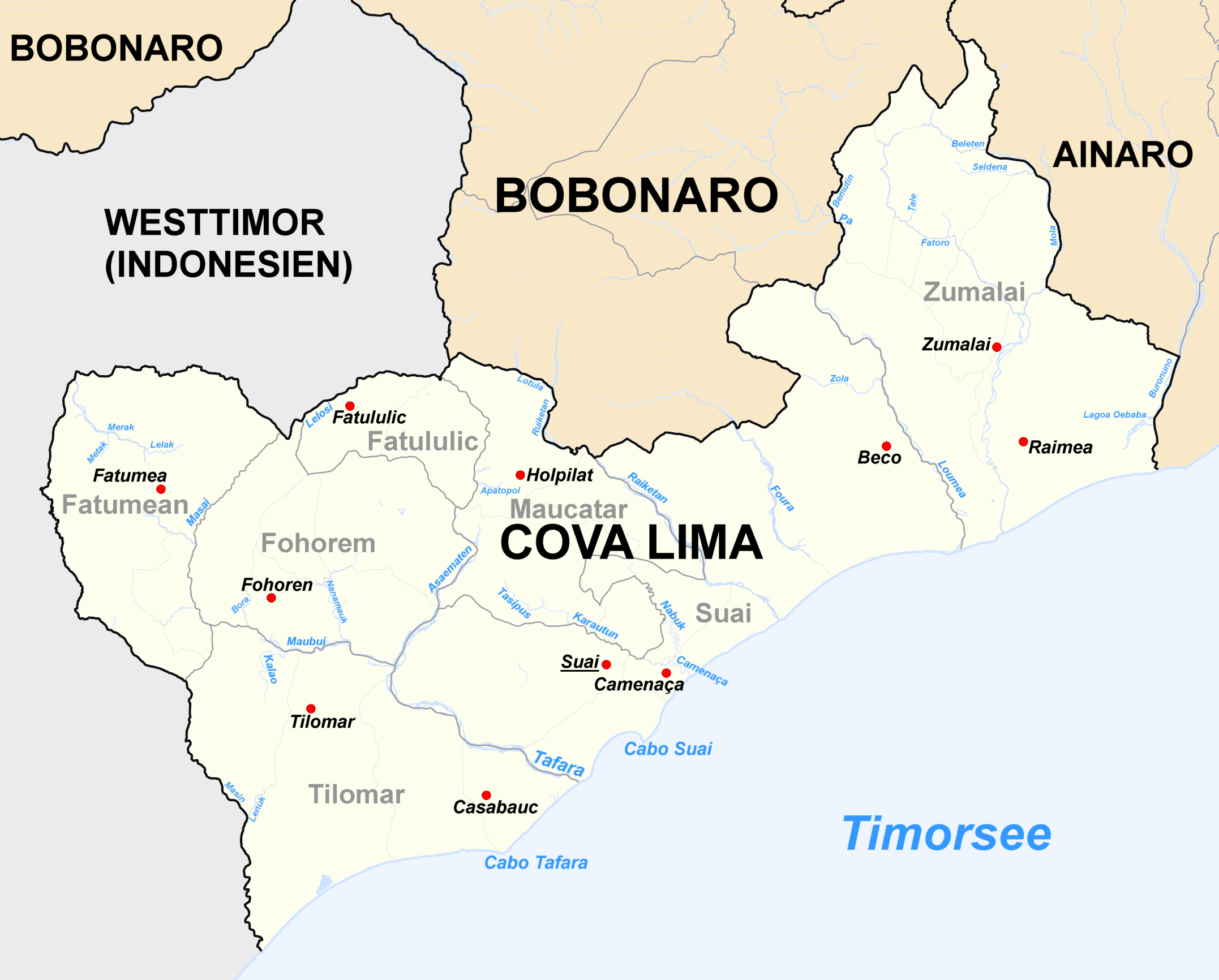
Location of Zumalai city in the east of Cova-Lima district.

Zumalai is a city and subdistrict (former Mape-Zumalai) in Timor-Leste. The subdistrict has been part of Cova Lima District since 2003. Before that, it was part of Ainaro District. The Zumalai subdistrict has six main villages: Fatuleto, Raimea, Zulo, Mape, Lour, and Taisilin.

== Language ==
There are three main local languages in Zumalai subdistrict, Bunak, Kemak, and Tetun-Terik.
