= Matai, Maucatar =

Coordinates: 9.2992°S 125.2653°E

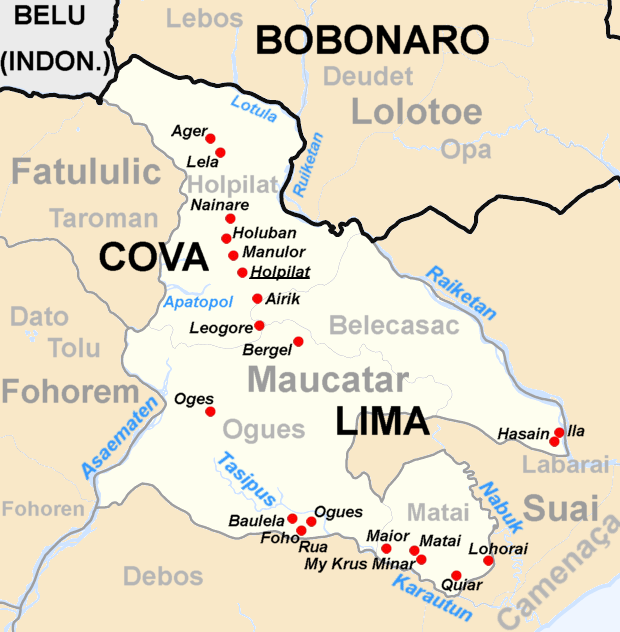
Map of Maucatar Subdistrict with Matai in the Southeast

Matai is a village (suco) located on northeast of Suai in East Timor. It is part of Maucatar Subdistrict, Cova Lima District.

== Geography and politics ==
Matai has four sub-villages (Aldeias): Maior/Cunain (Kunain), Quiar (Kiar), Matai (former Cruz Mina Rai), and Lohorai.

Mr. Nuno Jose M. Pereira is the village leader.

== Culture ==
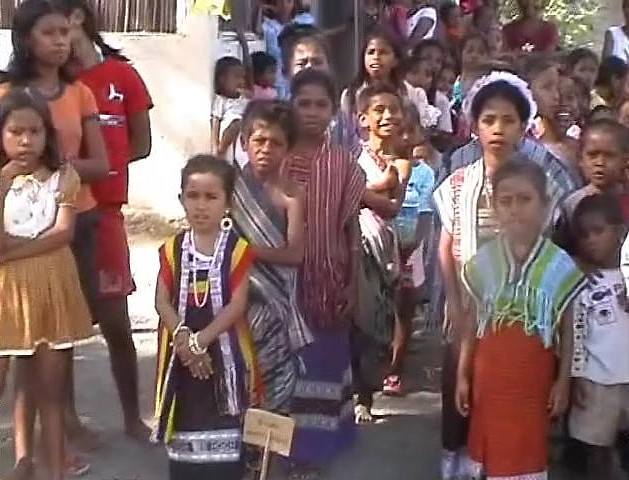
Children in Matai at Christmas 2004

Bunak and Tetum Terik are the main language in Matai.

Matai is a well known in Suai for its 'Tua Moruk', a kind of local alcohol made out of palm or palm wine; according to the people of Suai it is the best palm wine in Cova Lima.

Matai has one main Football Club called 'Hasuma' (Halibur Suco Matai).

== History ==
In 1999 the two pro-Independence Marshal Amaral Cortereal, together with Mr. Felisberto, were captured in Matai and taken away by the Militia group( LAKSAUR) and murdered in Salele village. Their corpse identified in 2010 through an autopsy.
