= Mattai =

Mattai may refer to:

- Mar Mattai Monastery, the traditional see of the Orthodox maphrian in Bartella
- Mar Matti or Matthew the Hermit
- Nittai of Arbela or Mattai of Arbela, av beit din of the Sanhedrin under the nasi Joshua ben Perachyah at the time of John Hyrcanus (reigned 134–104 BCE)
- Suchitra Mattai (born 1973), Guyanese-born American contemporary artist

== See also ==
- Matai (disambiguation)
