= Lolotoe =

City in East Timor

Coordinates: 9°10′S 125°16′E

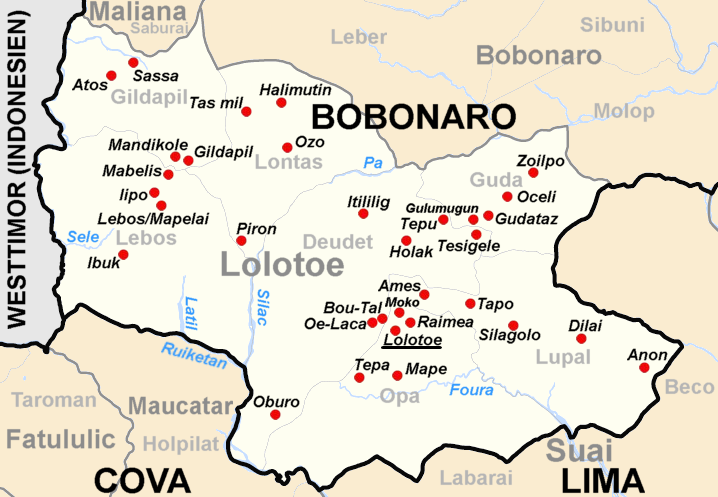
Subdistrict Lolotoe

Lolotoe is a town in Bobonaro District, Timor-Leste. It is the capital of Lolotoe subdistrict, which has 7,021 inhabitants. Most of them are cultivating coffee.

The subdistrict is subdivided into seven sucos: Deudet, Gildapil (Gilapil), Guda, Lebos, Lontas, Lupai (Lupal) and Opa.

Lolotoe suffered a lot under violent clashes of 1999 by Timorese pro-Indonesia militias and Indonesian army.
