= Maucatar Administrative Post =

Administrative post in Cova Lima Municipality, Timor-Leste

Maucatar
- Administrative Post
- Posto Administrativo de Maucatar (Portuguese); Postu administrativu Maukatar (Tetum)
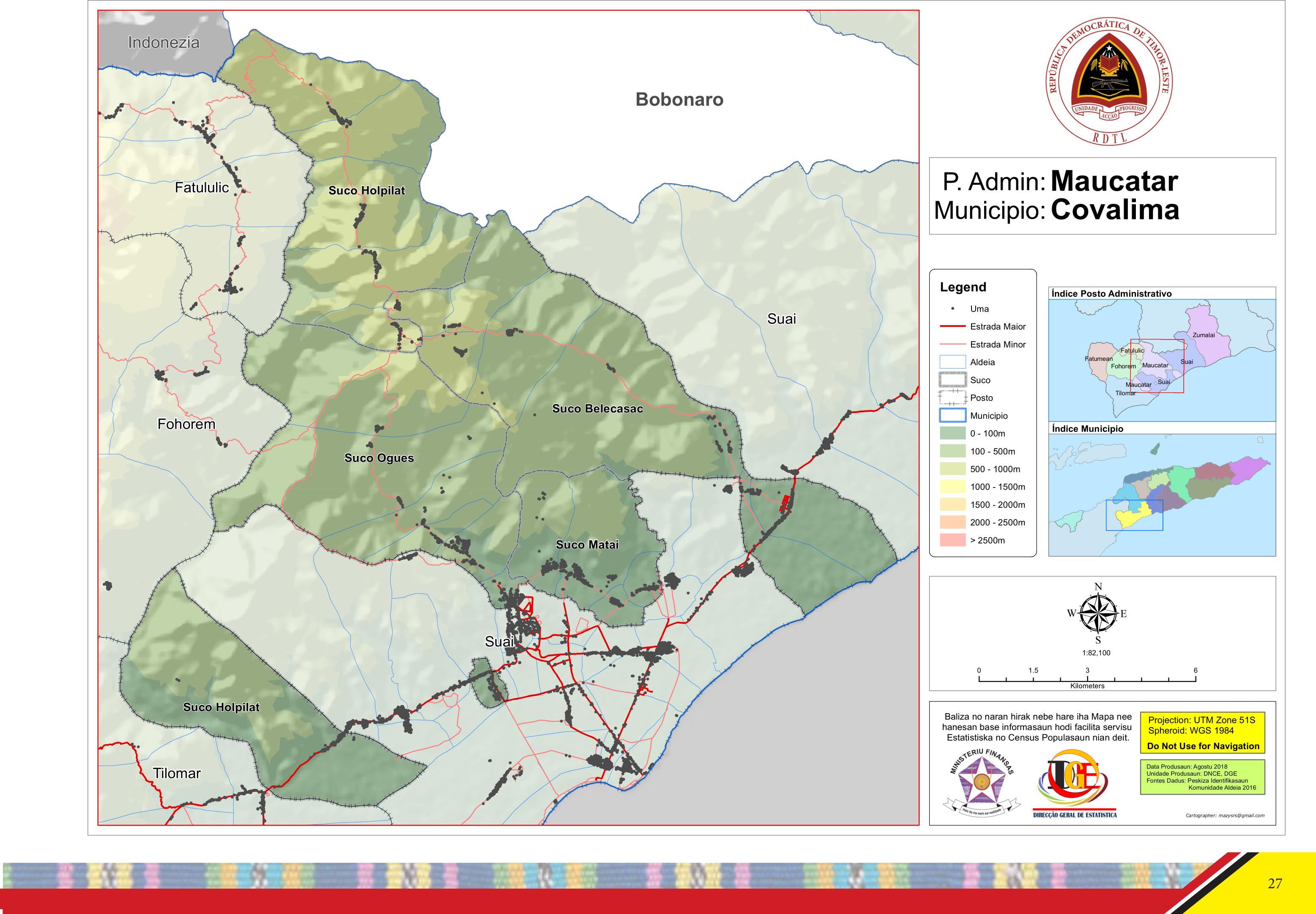
- Official map

- Location within East Timor
- Coordinates: 9°13′S 125°14′E
- Country: Timor-Leste
- Municipality: Cova Lima
- Seat: Ogues
- Sucos: Belecasac; Holpilat; Matai; Ogues

Area
  - Total: 138.7 km^{2} (53.6 sq mi)

Population (2015 census)
  - Total: 8,895
  - Density: 64.13/km^{2} (166.1/sq mi)

Households (2015 census)
  - Total: 1,651
- Time zone: UTC+09:00 (TLT)

Maucatar, officially Maucatar Administrative Post (Portuguese: Posto Administrativo de Maucatar, Tetum: Postu administrativu Maukatar), is an administrative post (and was formerly a subdistrict) in Cova Lima municipality, Timor-Leste. Its seat or administrative centre is Ogues, and its population at the 2004 census was 5,876.
