= Bobonaro =

- Town
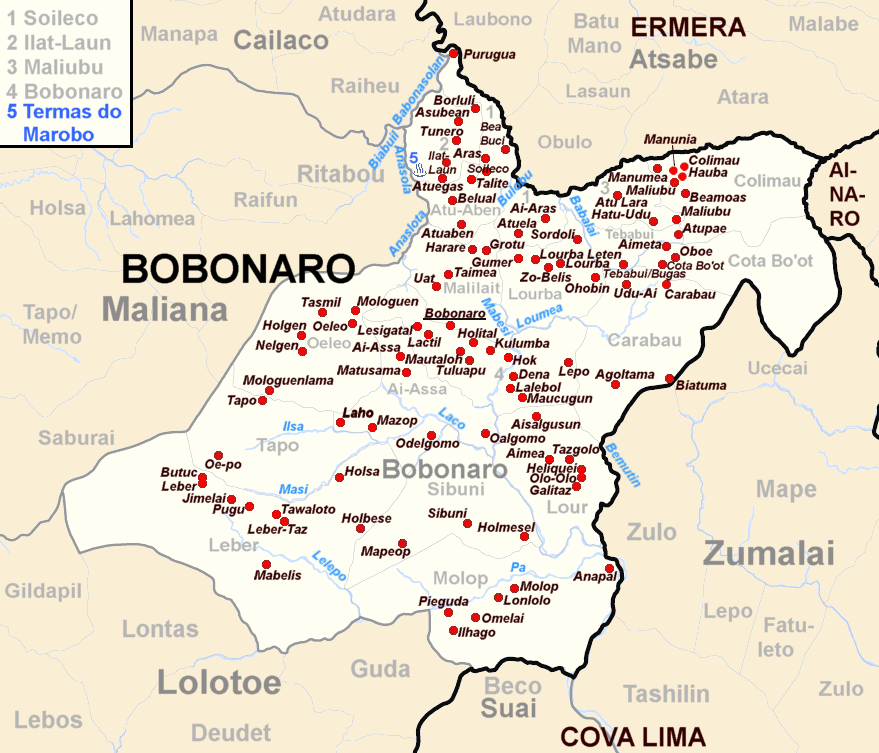

- Location in Timor-Leste
- Coordinates: 9°1′55″S 125°19′30″E
- Country: Timor-Leste
- District: Bobonaro District
- Subdistrict: Bobonaro Subdistrict
- Suco: Bobonaro and Malilait

Population
  - Town: 6,110
  - Metro: 22,756
- Climate: Aw

Bobonaro is a town in Bobonaro Subdistrict, Bobonaro District, Timor-Leste. The district capital is not in Bobonaro, but is in Maliana instead. Bobonaro suco has 1,532 inhabitants.

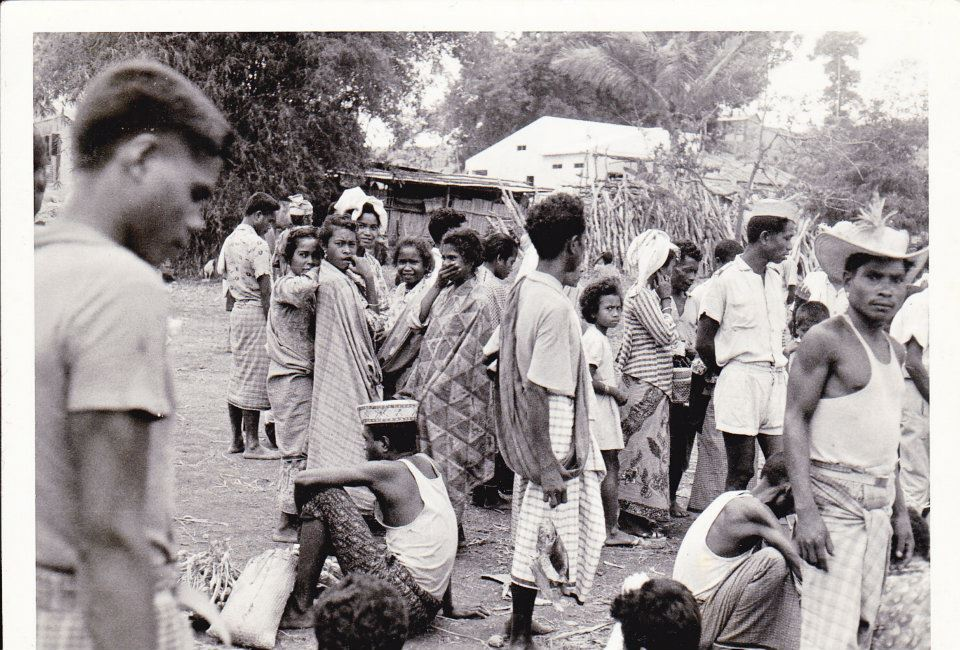
Market in Bobonaro (1968)
