= Atoni =

Ethnic group

Atoni people Atoin Meto / Dawan
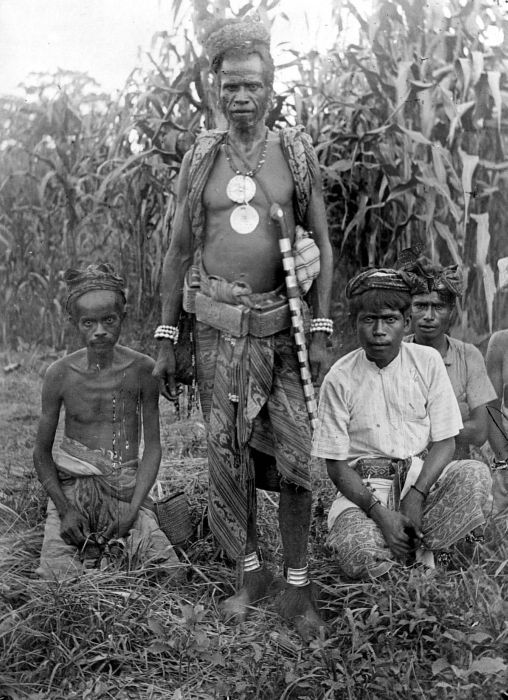
- Atoni warrior priest.

Total population
- 844,030

Regions with significant populations
- Timor Island: Indonesia (West Timor): 761,000; Timor-Leste: 80,000; Others: Portugal: 3,030

Languages
- Uab Meto, Indonesian, Portuguese, Tetum, and others

Religion
- Christianity (predominantly), Islam, folk religion

Related ethnic groups
- Bunak • Helong • Mambai

The Atoni (also known as the Atoin Meto, Atoin Pah Meto or Dawan) people are an ethnic group on Timor, in Indonesian West Timor and the East Timorese enclave of Oecussi-Ambeno. They number around 844,030. Their language is Uab Meto.

The Atoni live in villages consisting of 50 to 60 people, each village is surrounded with stone fence or shrubs, with fields and cattle cages on the periphery. The houses usually form a circular cluster, or following the road after the introduction of a road.

== Spatial symbolism ==
According to ethnographer Clarke Cunningham, their culture is notable for its spatial symbolism, associated with a gender dichotomy. Male-female principle is important, as with the duality of sun-earth, light-dark, open-close, dry season-wet season, outer-inner, central-periphery, secular-sacral, right-left, and so on. This in turn affects the spatial configuration of an Atoni house.

The right side of the house (facing the door) is always male, whereas the left is female. The center of the house (and the attic) is male, while the periphery of the house is female. The interior of the house is female, the terrace is male. The house is female and the yard is male. This principle conceived the Atoni house as a microcosmos. The house also expresses social order.

A more elaborate house is called Ume Atoni (Atoni means "male"). The house is dominantly male in quality. The Atoni entertains their guest in a communal house called Lopo. A Lopo is always located in front of a house and is oriented to the road.

Furthermore, each cardinal direction is associated with a gender, as are different parts of a house. Sex and gender do not always line up, as an important lord is called a "female-man," and is accordingly always a man, but performs stereotypically female duties.

== Eponyms ==
A species of skink, Eremiascincus antoniorum, which is endemic to Timor, is named in honor of the Atoni people.

== Literature ==
- Clarke E. Cunningham, Atoni Borrowing Of Children: An Aspect Of Mediation, in: Spiro, M.E. (ed.), American Ethnological Society Proceedings, Annual Spring Meeting, Seattle, 1965.
- Clarke E. Cunningham, Categories Of Descent Groups In A Timorese Village, in: Oceania 37, 1966:13-21.
- Herbert W. Jardner, Textilien der Atoni. Variationen eines Stils in West-Timor, unpubl. Magisterschrift, 1988, Köln.
- Herbert W. Jardner, Die Kuan Fatu-Chronik. Form und Kontext der mümdlichen Dichtung der Atoin Meto (Amanuban, Westtimor), Veröffentlichungen des Seminars für Indonesische und Südseesprachen der Unsiversität Hamburg, Band 23, Berlin und Hamburg, 1999.
- Herbert W. und Heidrun Jardner, Eingefangene Fäden. Textile Verzierungstechniken in West-Timor, Indonesien, Austronesia Bd.1, herausgegeben von Rainer Carle und Peter Pink, 2., neu bearb. und erw. Aufl., Hamburg, 1995.
- Andrew R. McWilliam, Harvest of the nakaf: A Study of Headhunting Among the Atoni of West Timor, B.Litt.thesis, Australian National University, 1982.
- Andrew R. McWilliam, Narrating the gate and the path. Place and precedence in South West Timor, Ph.D.thesis Australian National University, 1989.
- Schulte Nordholt, H.G., The Political System Of The Atoni Of Timor, Verhandelingen Koninklijk Instituut 60, 1971. doi:10.26530/OAPEN_613379
