= Bunak language =

Papuan language spoken on Timor-Leste, Indonesia

Bunak
- Native to: Indonesia, Timor-Leste
- Region: central Timor
- Ethnicity: Bunak
- Native speakers: 76,000 (2010)
- Language family: Trans–New Guinea ?: Berau Gulf; West Bomberai; Timor–Alor–Pantar; Bunak

Official status
- Recognised minority language in: East Timor

Language codes
- ISO 639-3: bfn
- Glottolog: buna1278
- ELP: Bunak
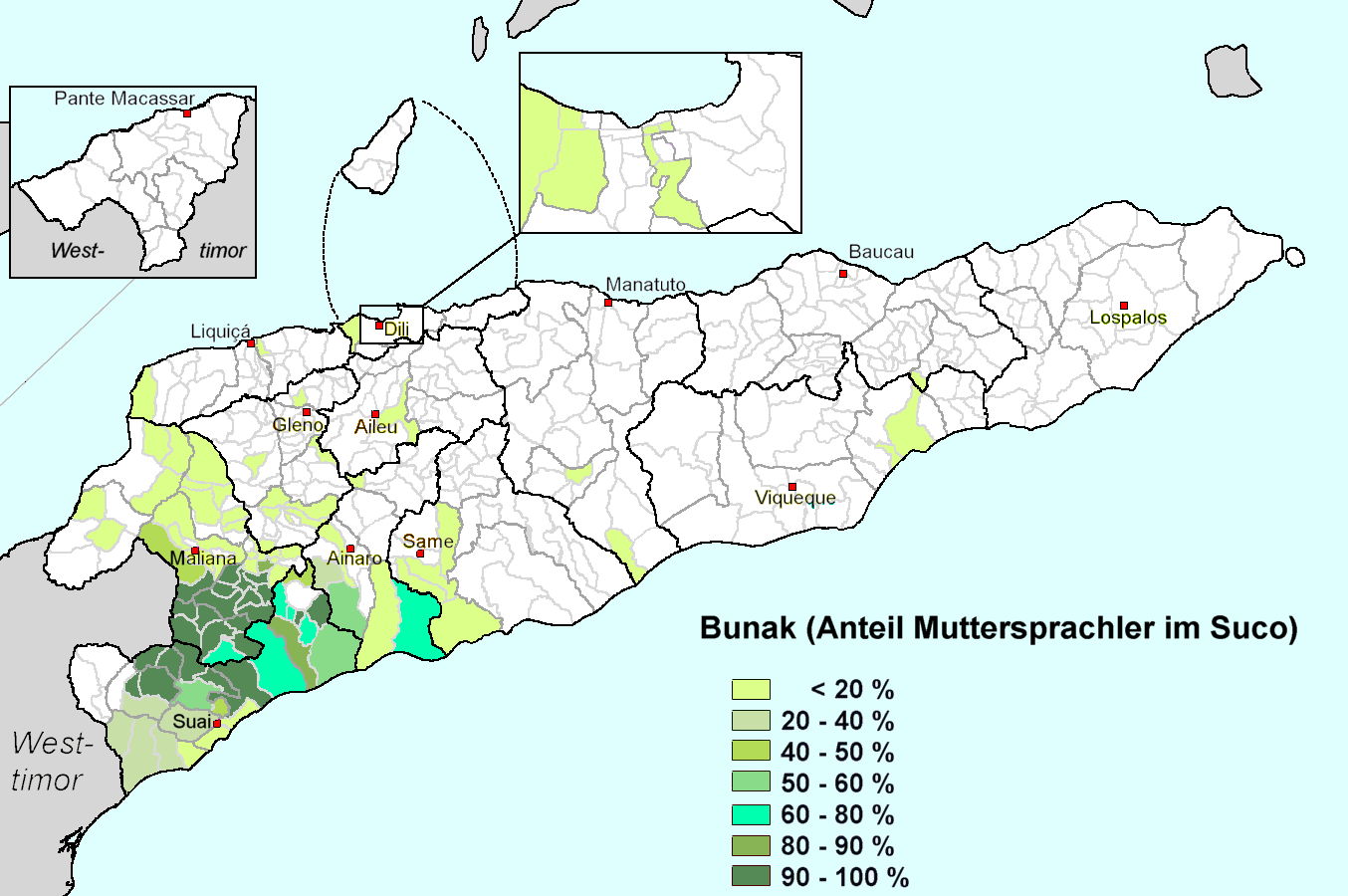
- Distribution of Bunak in Timor-Leste (West Timor not shown)

The Bunak language (also known as Bunaq, Buna', Bunake, pronounced [bunaʔ]) is the language of the Bunak people of the mountainous region of central Timor, split between the political boundary between West Timor, Indonesia, particularly in Lamaknen District and Timor-Leste. It is one of the few on Timor which is not an Austronesian language, but rather a Papuan language of the Timor–Alor–Pantar language family. The language is surrounded by Malayo-Polynesian languages, like Uab Meto and Tetun.

Bunak distinguishes between animate and inanimate noun classes.

== Phonology ==
=== Consonants ===
The following are Bunaq's consonant phonemes:

		Labial	Alveolar	Palatal	Velar	Glottal
Nasal		m	n			
Plosive/ Affricate	voiceless	p	t	(tʃ)	k	ʔ
Plosive/ Affricate	voiced	b	d		g	
Fricative	voiceless		s			h
Fricative	voiced		z			
Approximant		w	l			
Trill			r			

- /p t k/ may be unreleased [p̚ t̚ k̚] word-finally.
- /b d g/ may be realized as [β r ɣ] intervocalically.
- /g/ may be realized as [dʒ] before /i/.
- /s/ has unrestricted distribution while /z h/ appear only in onsets.
- /z/ may be realized as [z ʒ dʒ] in free variation.
- /l/ may be realized as [ɬ] word-finally in free variation.

/tʃ/ is marginal and often replaced by /s/ in frequent vocabulary, indicating that a merger might be in process. It is found in 14 lexical items (in a 2000+ corpus):

- /tʃia/ 'burn'
- /tʃiaʔ/ 'not want'
- /tʃie/ 'chicken'
- /tʃiel/ 'bright'
- /tʃier/ 'sleep'
- /tʃiet/ 'rip open'
- /tʃileʔ/ 'pour'
- /tʃilon/ 'thorny'
- /tʃinoʔ/ 'hot'
- /tʃio/ 'who'
- /tʃiro/ 'which (person)'
- /tʃiwal/ 'flee'

=== Vowels ===
The following are Bunaq's monophthong and diphthong phonemes:

	Front	Central	Back
Close	i		u
Mid	e		o
Open		a	

	Front	Central	Back
Close			
Mid	ei̯		oi̯
Open		ai̯	

== Pronouns ==
Pronouns seem to tie Bunak more closely to the Alor–Pantar languages, in a group Ross (2005) calls "West Timor", than with the Papuan East Timor languages. The independent pronouns and object prefixes, which appear to retain the proto-Trans–New Guinea dual suffix *-li, are as follows:

		singular	dual	plural
1st person	exclusive	ne-to n-	ne-li n-	ne-i n-
1st person	inclusive	ne-to n-	i-li ∅-	i ∅-
2nd person		e-to ∅-	e-li ∅-	e-i ∅-
3rd person	animate	himo g-	–	hala'i g-
3rd person	inanimate	homo	–	hala'i g-

== Bibliography ==
- Holton, Gary; Klamer, Marian (2018). "The Papuan languages of East Nusantara and the Bird's Head". In Palmer, Bill (ed.). The Languages and Linguistics of the New Guinea Area: A Comprehensive Guide. The World of Linguistics. Vol. 4. Berlin: De Gruyter Mouton. pp. 569–640. ISBN 978-3-11-028642-7.
- Schapper, Antoinette (2009). Bunaq: A Papuan Language of Central Timor (Ph.D. thesis). Australian National University. doi:10.25911/5d611d87406d0. hdl:1885/150147.
- Schapper, Antoinette (2011a). "Crossing the border: Historical and linguistic divides among the Bunaq in central Timor". Wacana, Journal of the Humanities of Indonesia. 13 (1): 29–49. doi:10.17510/wjhi.v13i1.8.
- Schapper, Antoinette (2011b). "Finding Bunaq: The homeland and expansion of the Bunaq in central Timor". In McWilliam, Andrew; Traube, Elizabeth G. (eds.). Land and Life in Timor-Leste: Ethnographic Essays. ANU Press. doi:10.22459/lltl.12.2011.08. ISBN 978-1-921862-59-5.
- Schapper, Antoinette (2022). A Grammar of Bunaq. Mouton Grammar Library. Vol. 86. Mouton deGruyter. ISBN 9783110714500.
