= Languages of Timor-Leste =

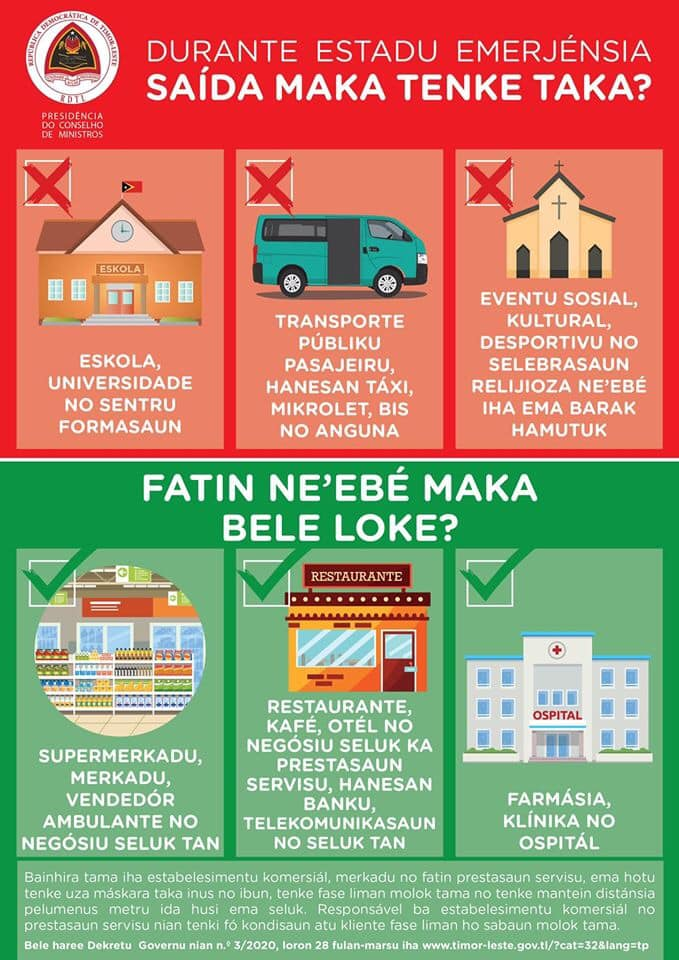
- COVID-19 guidelines in Tetun
- Official: Portuguese, Tetun
- National: Tetun
- Recognised: Uab Meto, Fataluku
- Vernacular: East Timorese Portuguese
- Minority: Bekais, Bunak, Galoli, Habun, Idalaka, Kawaimina, Kemak, Lovaia, Makalero, Makasae, Mambai, Tokodede, Wetarese, Dili Malay
- Foreign: English, Indonesian
- Signed: Tetun Sign Language, Indonesian Sign Language
- Keyboard layout: Portuguese QWERTY

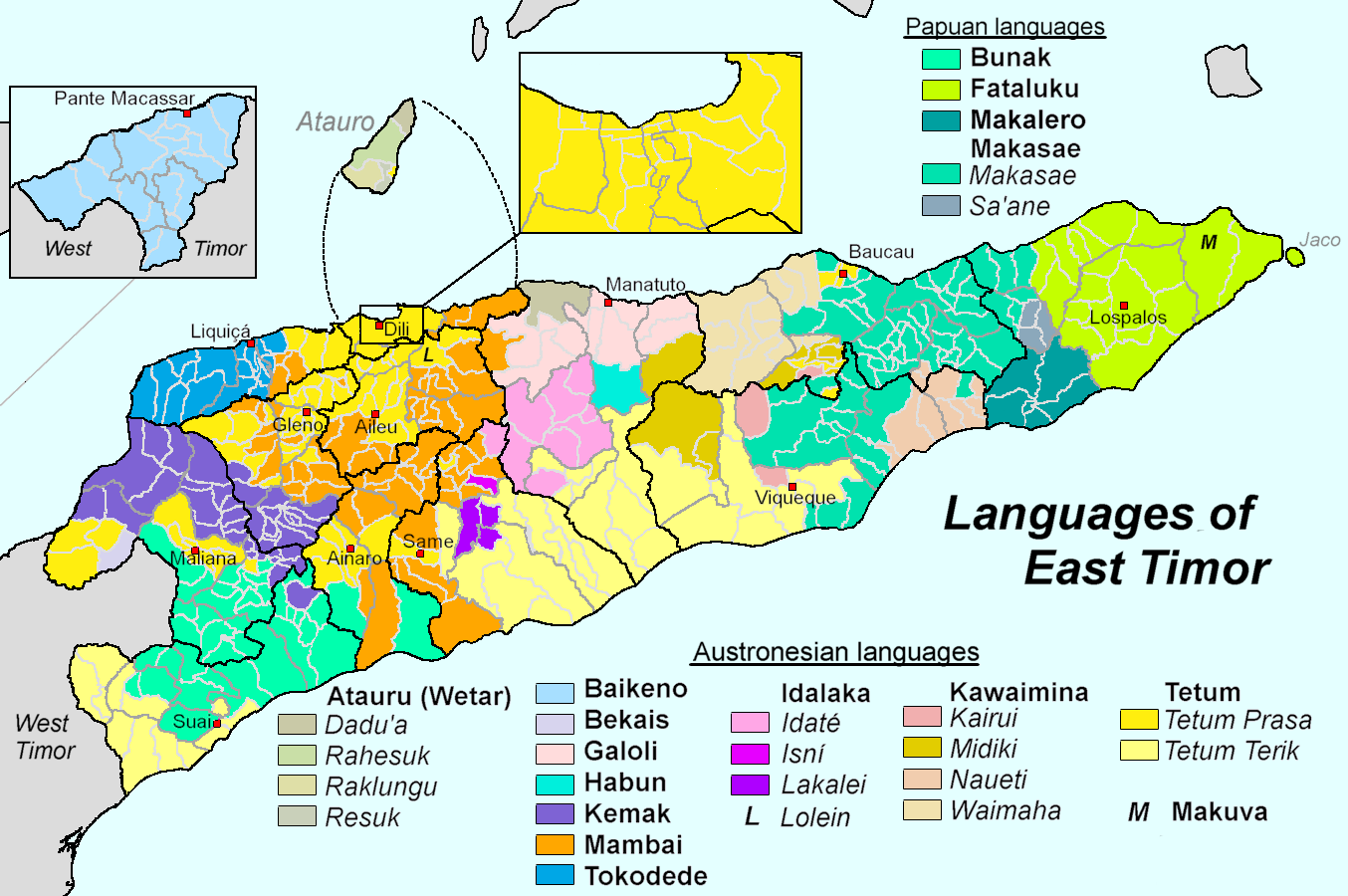
Biggest language groups in sucos of Timor-Leste.

The languages of Timor-Leste include both Austronesian and Papuan languages. (See Timor–Flores languages and Timor–Alor–Pantar languages.) The lingua franca and national language of Timor-Leste is Tetun, an Austronesian language influenced by Portuguese, with which it has equal status as an official language. The language of the Oecusse exclave is Uab Meto (Dawan). Fataluku is a Papuan language widely used in the eastern part of the country (often more so than Tetun). A dialect of Malay-based creole called Dili Malay is spoken by a number of residents in the capital Dili, which has borrowed words mostly from Portuguese and Tetun. Both Portuguese and Tetun have official recognition under the Constitution of Timor-Leste, as do other indigenous languages, including: Bekais, Bunak, Galoli, Habun, Idalaka, Kawaimina, Kemak, Lovaia, Makalero, Makasae, Mambai, Tokodede and Wetarese.

The rise of lingua francas in the linguistically diverse Timor-Leste and the domination of several clans over others have led to the extinction of many smaller languages. However, some of them are still in use as ritual languages or cants. Research done in the mid-2000s by the Dutch linguist Aone van Engelenhoven, for example, revealed that the Makuva language, formerly spoken by the Makuva tribe but believed to have been extinct since the 1950s, was still used occasionally.

In 2007, Van Engelenhoven discovered the existence of another language that was essentially extinct, called Rusenu.

== Official languages ==
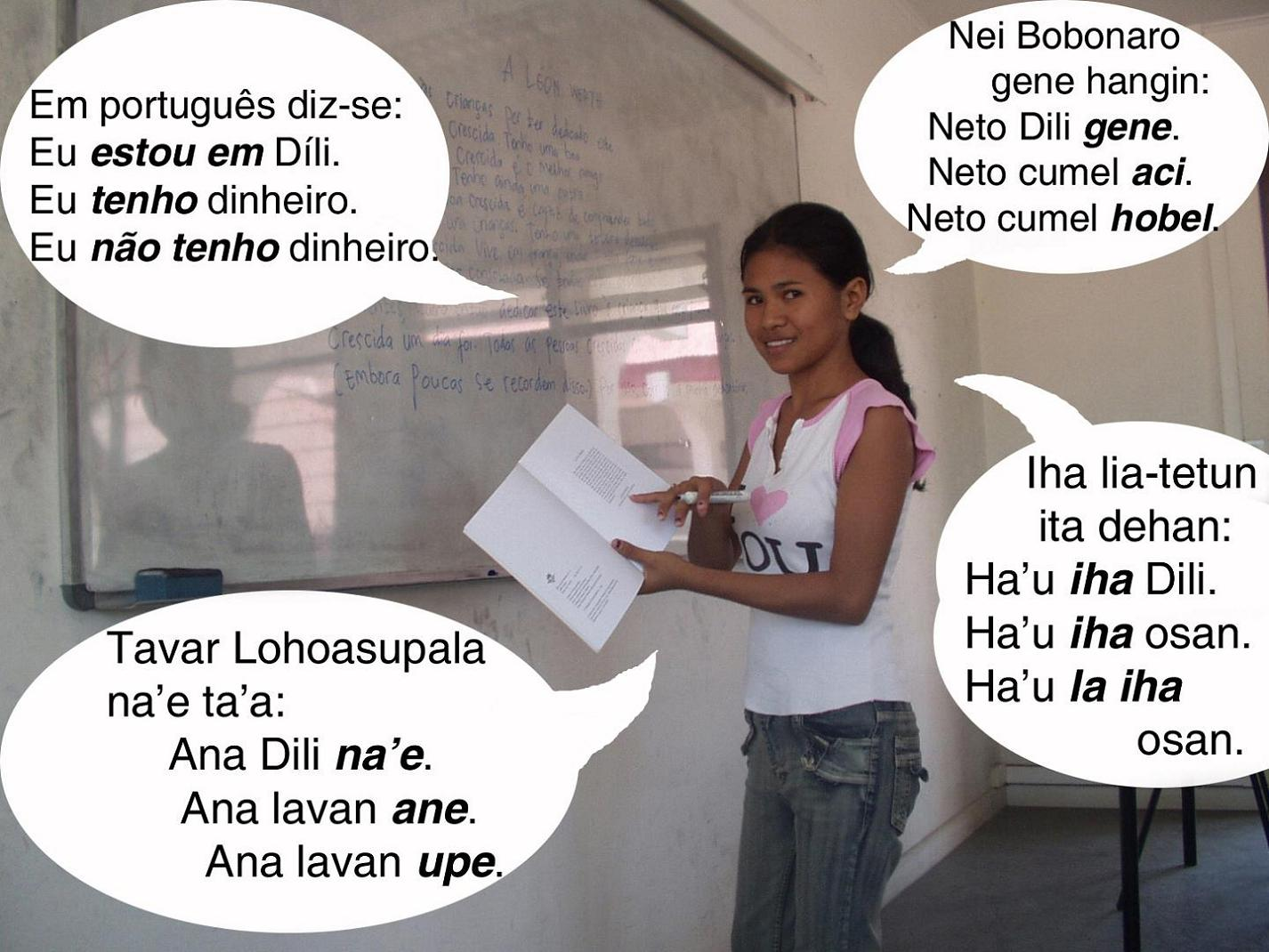
An East Timorese girl speaking (from clockwise) Bunak, Tetun, Fataluku, and Portuguese. Translation: In Bunak/Tetun/Fataluku/Portuguese, we say: I am in Dili. I have some money. I do not have any money.

Section 13(1) of the 2002 constitution designates Portuguese and Tetun as Timor-Leste's two official languages. The same section also provides that "Tetun and the other national languages shall be valued and developed by the State." English and Indonesian are sometimes used and section 159 of the constitution provides that these languages serve as "working languages within civil service side by side with official languages as long as deemed necessary".

Under Portuguese rule, all education was through the medium of Portuguese, although it coexisted with Tetun and other languages. Portuguese particularly influenced the dialect of Tetun spoken in the capital, Dili, known as Tetun Prasa, as opposed to the more traditional version spoken in rural areas, known as Tetun Terik. Tetun Prasa is the version more widely used, and is now taught in schools.

Under Indonesian rule from 1976 to 1999, East Timor's official language was Indonesian; It, along with English, currently has the status of a 'working language' under the present constitution.

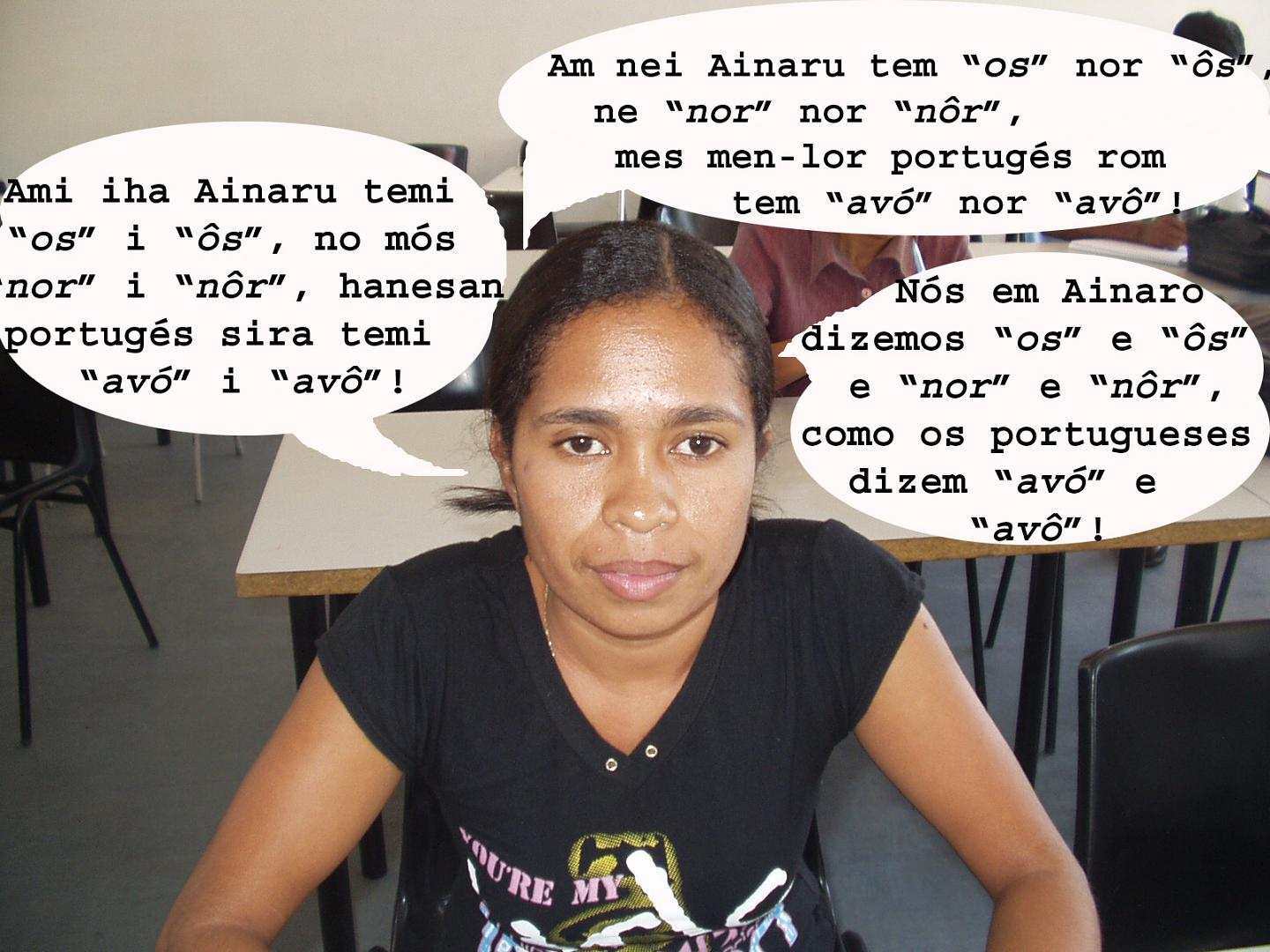
An East Timorese girl speaking (clockwise from top) Mambai, Portuguese, and Tetun. Translation: In Ainaro, we say "os" and "ôs" and "nor" and "nôr", just as the Portuguese say "avó" and "avô" (grandfather and grandmother)!

For many older East Timorese, the Indonesian language has negative connotations with the Suharto regime, some parties are also considering as early as after independence in the 2000s to relabel it in the context as a working language to "Malay". On the other hand, many younger people expressed suspicion or hostility to the reinstatement of Portuguese, which they saw as a 'colonial language' in much the same way that Indonesians saw Dutch. However, whereas the Dutch culture and language had limited influence on those of Indonesia, the East Timorese and Portuguese cultures became intertwined, particularly through intermarriage, as did the languages. Portuguese was also a working language of the resistance against Indonesia.

Some young East Timorese felt at a disadvantage by the adoption of Portuguese as an official language, and accused the country's leaders of favouring the older generations who speak Portuguese and educated Timorese who had only recently returned from overseas, arguing that those older East Timorese who speak Portuguese or English had more job opportunities.

Many foreign observers, especially from Australia and Southeast Asia were also critical about the reinstatement of Portuguese and claim that English or Indonesian would have been preferable, which drew rebuttals from linguists in Timor-Leste. In spite of this, many Australian linguists have been closely involved with the official language policy, including the promotion of Portuguese.

Portugal and other Portuguese-speaking countries such as Brazil have supported the teaching of Portuguese in Timor-Leste. Some people in Timor-Leste complained that teachers from Portugal and Brazil were poorly equipped to teach in the country, as they did not know local languages, or understand the local culture.

Nevertheless, the late Sérgio Vieira de Mello, who headed the United Nations Transitional Administration in East Timor, was a Brazilian who established a close working relationship with Xanana Gusmão, the country's first president, as a fellow Portuguese-speaker but was respected by many East Timorese because of his efforts to learn Tetun.

== Languages by speakers ==
2010 native language census
1. Tetun-Dili/Prasa (36.6%)
2. Tetun-Terik (6.00%)
3. Mambai (12.5%)
4. Makasai (9.70%)
5. Baikenu (5.90%)
6. Kemak (5.90%)
7. Bunak (5.30%)
8. Tokodede (3.70%)
9. Fataluku (3.60%)
10. Other languages (10.9%)

Languages by number of native speakers

Language	Number	Year surveyed	Language family
Tetun-Dili/Prasa	385,000	2009	Austronesian
Mambai	131,000	2010 (census)	Austronesian
Makasae	102,000	2010 (census)	Timor–Alor–Pantar
Baikeno	72,000	2011	Austronesian
Tetun-Terik	63,500	2010 (census)	Austronesian
Kemak	62,000	2010 (census)	Austronesian
Bunak	55,000	2010 (census)	Timor–Alor–Pantar
Tocodede	39,500	2010 (census)	Austronesian
Fataluku	37,000	2010 (census)	Timor–Alor–Pantar
Waimoa	18,400	2012 (census)	Austronesian
Kairui-Midiki	15,000	2010 (census)	Austronesian
Naueti	15,000	2010 (census)	Austronesian
Idaté	13,500	2010 (census)	Austronesian
Galoli	13,000	2010 (census)	Austronesian
Makalero	6,500	2011	Timor–Alor–Pantar
Adabe	5,000	2010 (census)	Austronesian
Lakalei	3,250	2010 (census)	Austronesian
Habun	2,700	2010 (census)	Austronesian
Portuguese	600	2010 (census)	Indo-European
Makuv'a	56	2010 (census)	Austronesian

Literacy rates by language

Literacy rates (in percentage terms) in the co-official and working languages for East Timorese people aged 15–24 in 2004 and 2010. This shows which percentage of the age group is able to speak, read and write any of the four main lingua francas of Timor-Leste, either as a native or second language. Data are derived from Highlights of the 2010 census main results in Timor-Leste.

Year	Tetun	Indonesian	Portuguese	English	Any of the four
2004	68.1	66.8	17.2	10.0	72.5
2010	77.8	55.6	39.3	22.3	79.1
2015	83.0	49.9	49.6	28.2	

== Distribution of languages, 2010 ==
Census 2010

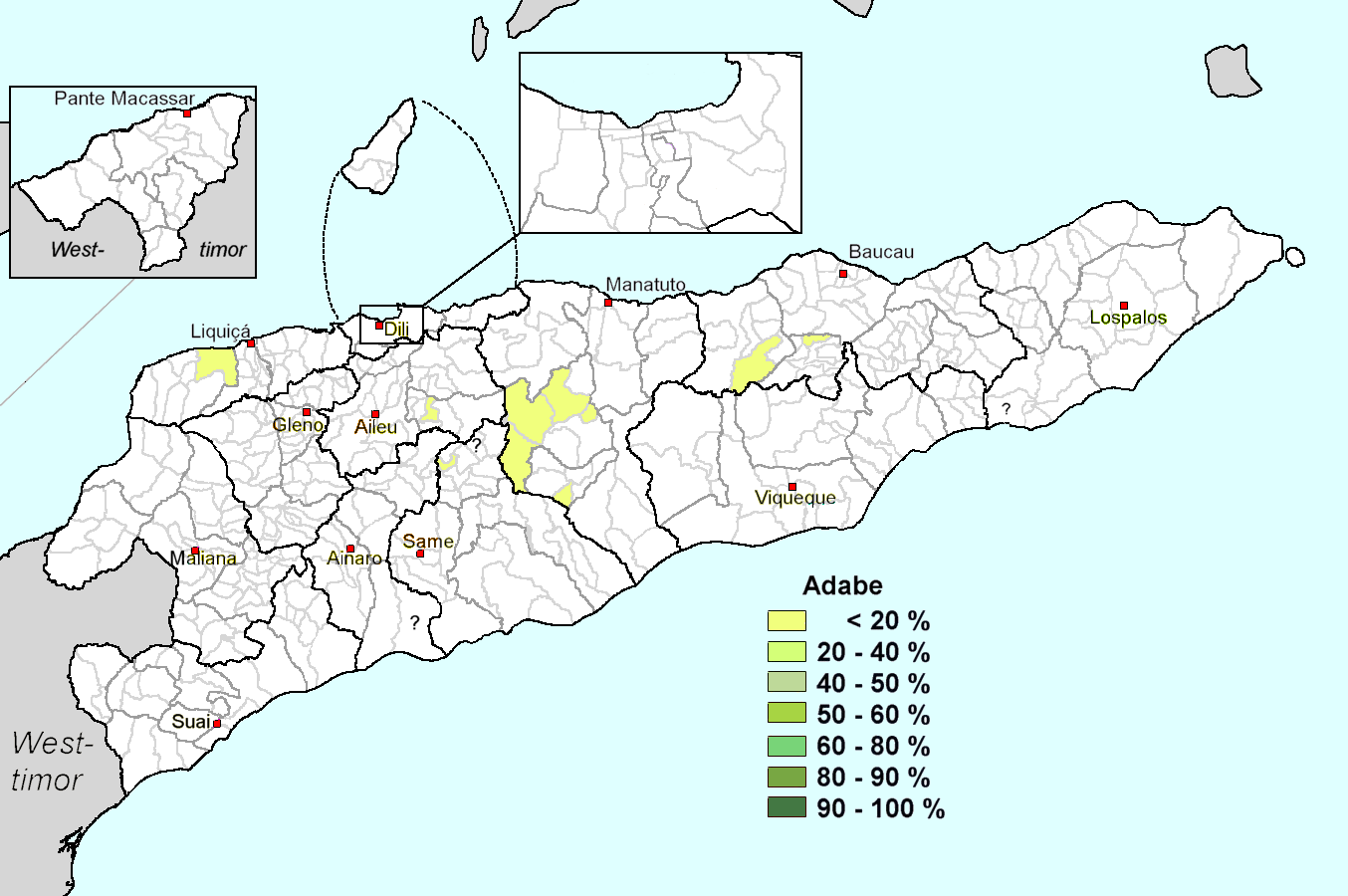
Adabe

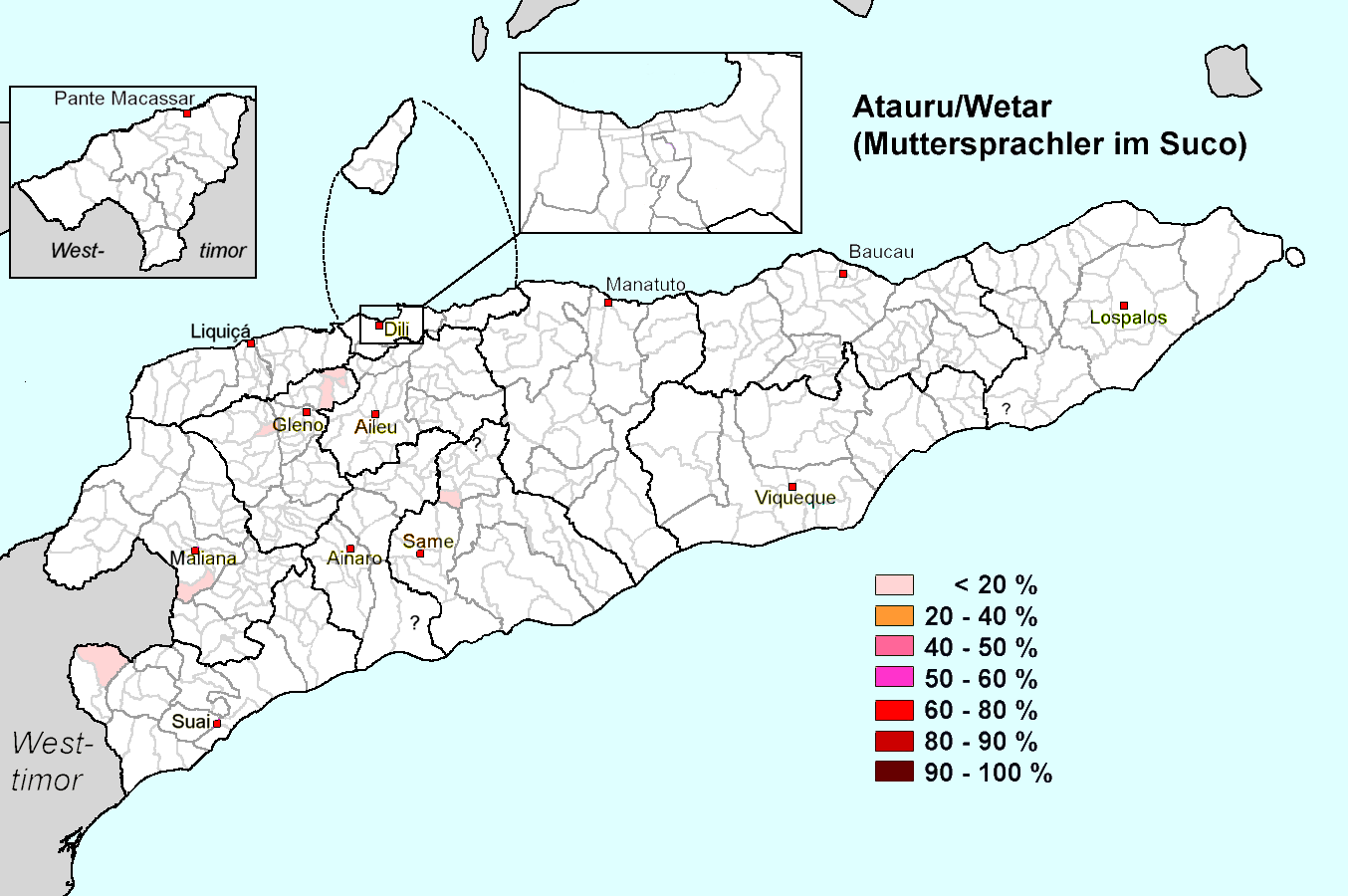
Atauru

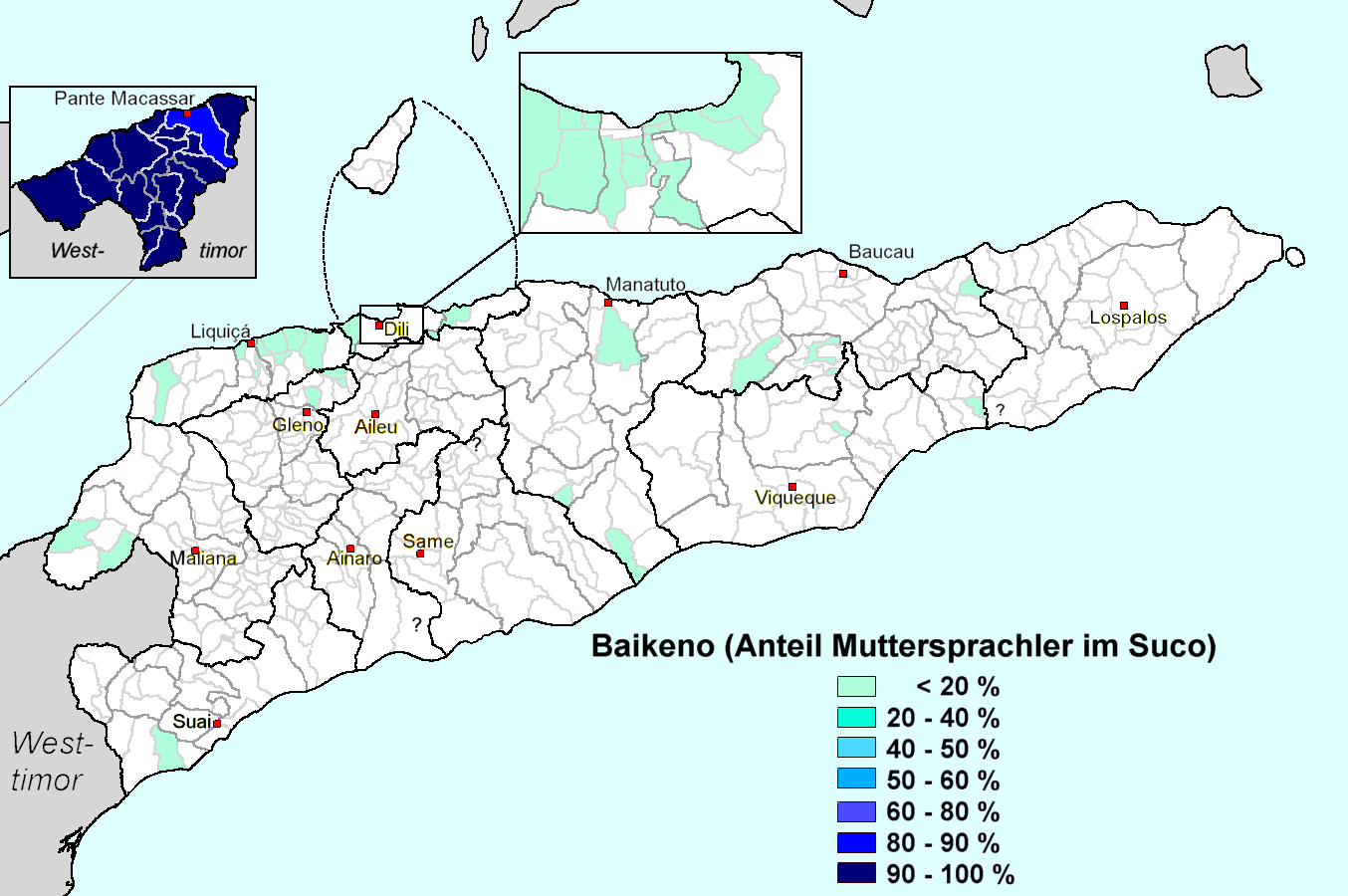
Baikeno

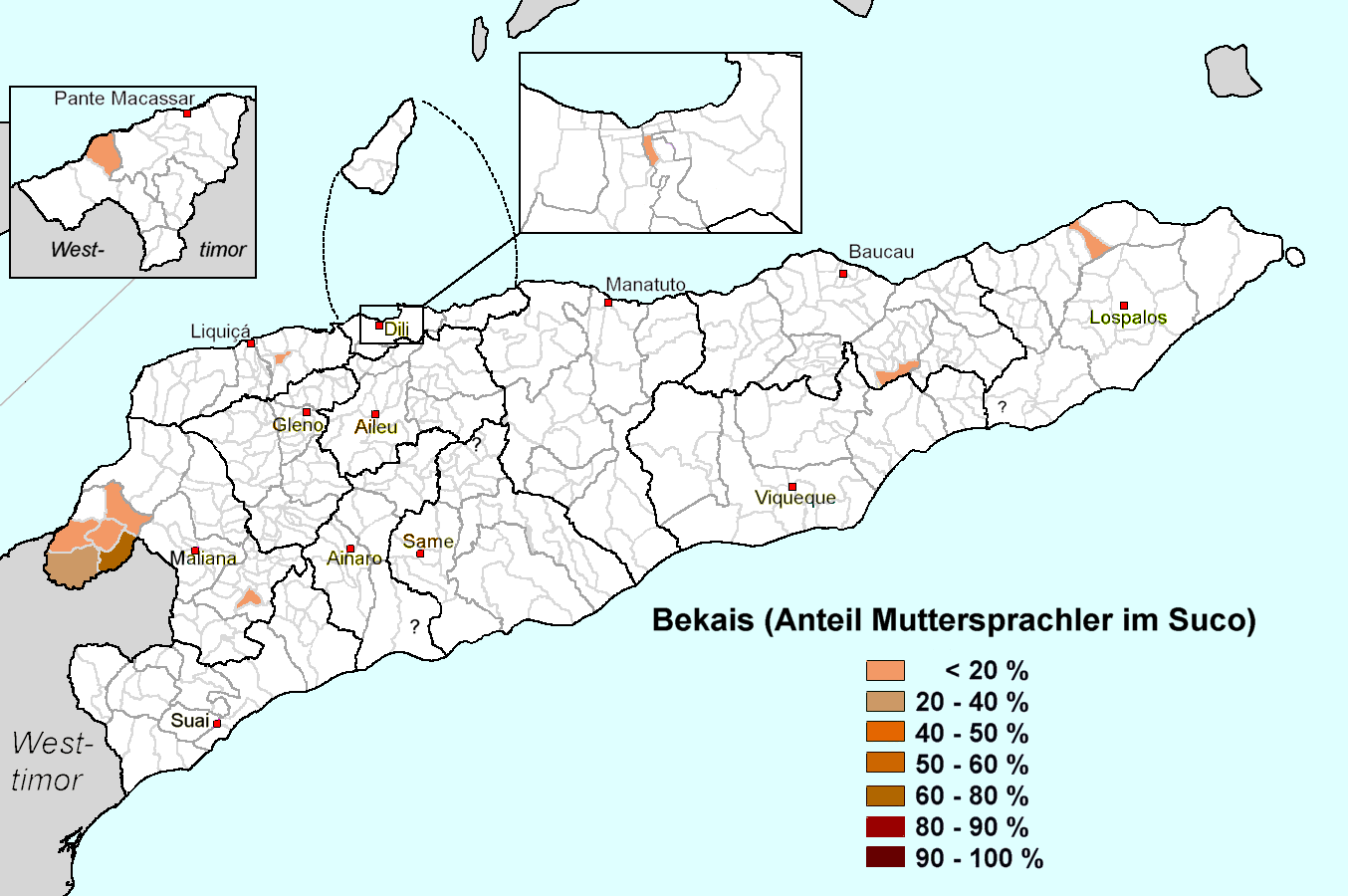
Bekais

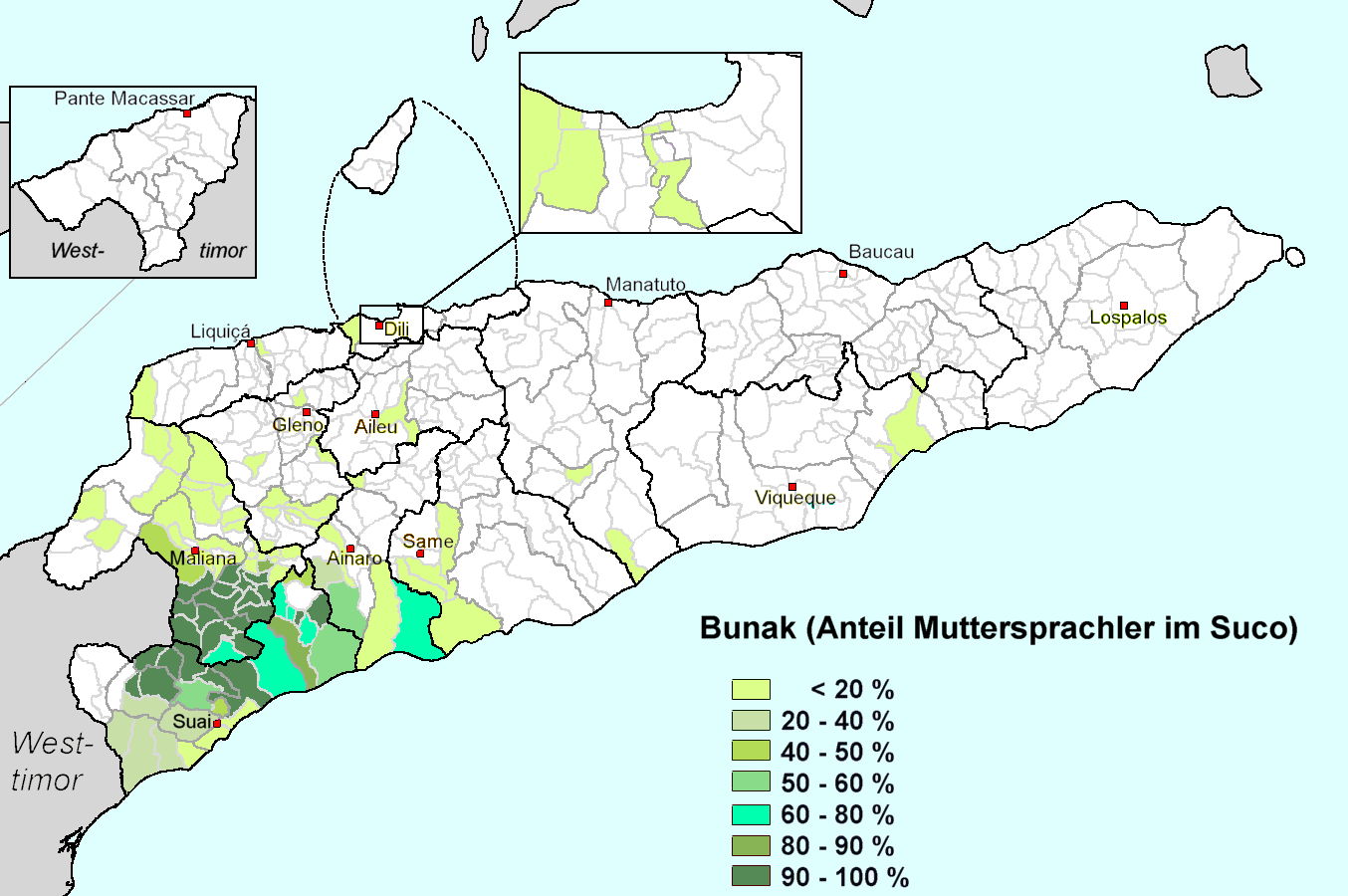
Bunak

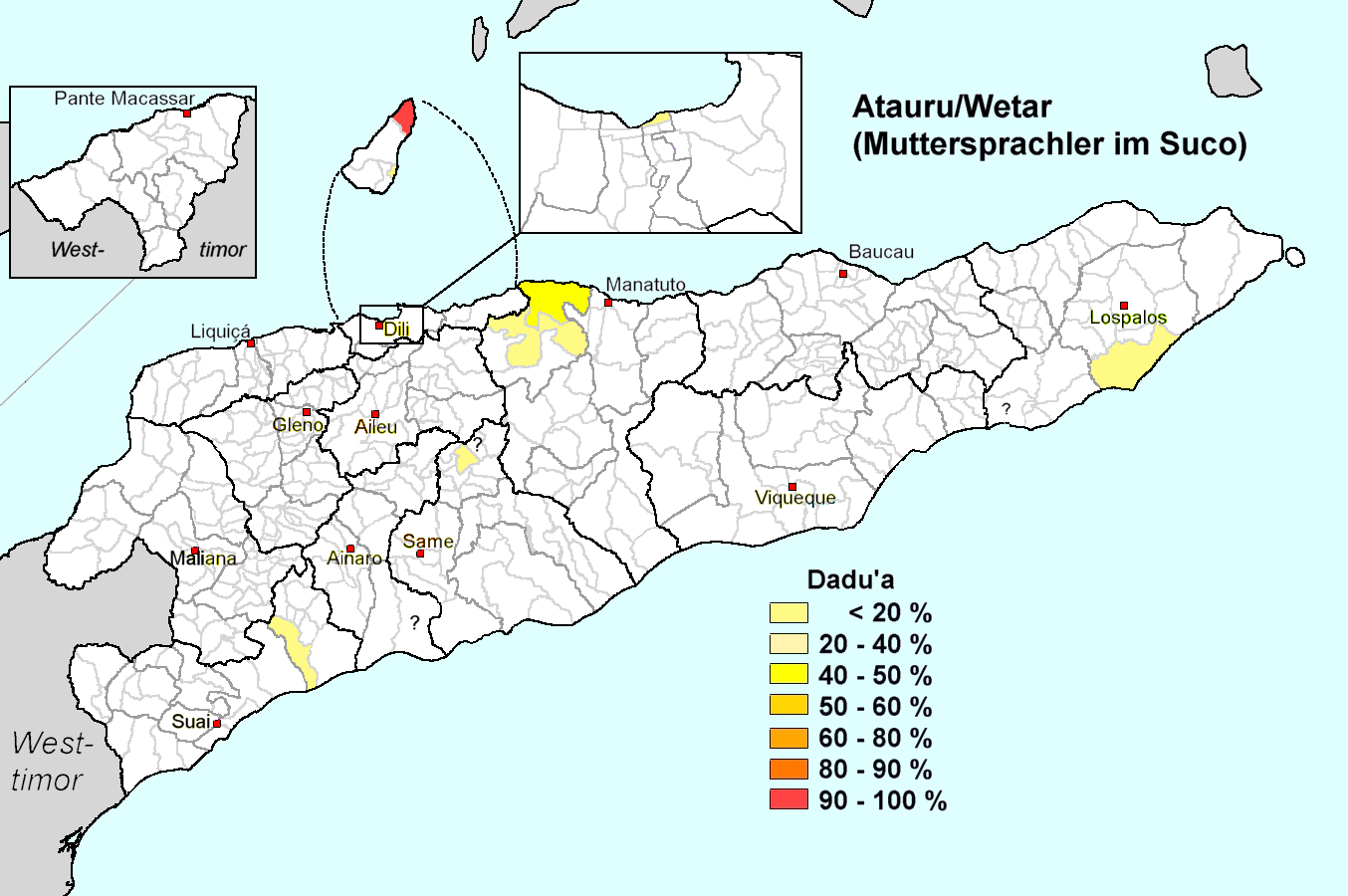
Dadu'a

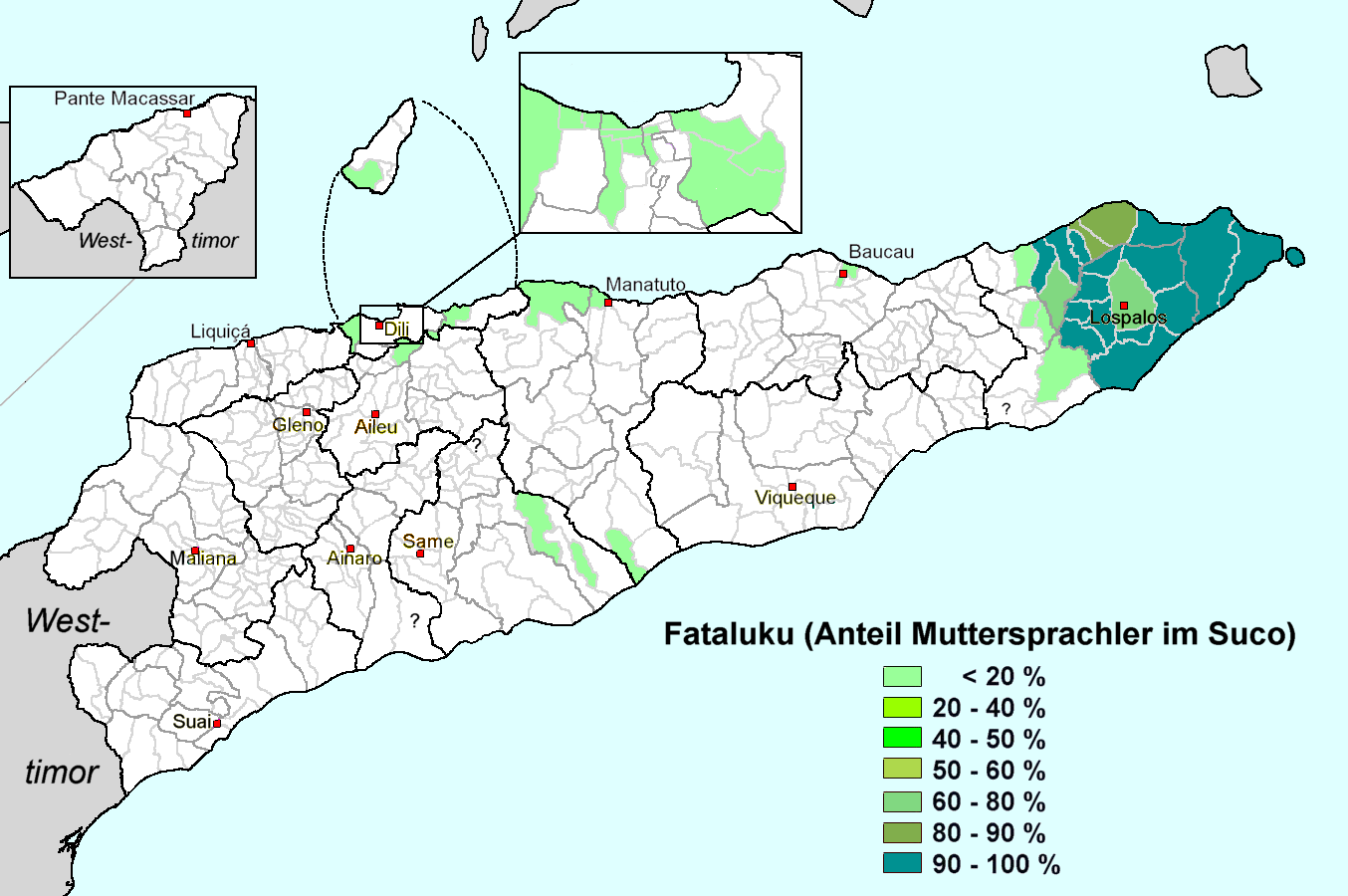
Fataluku

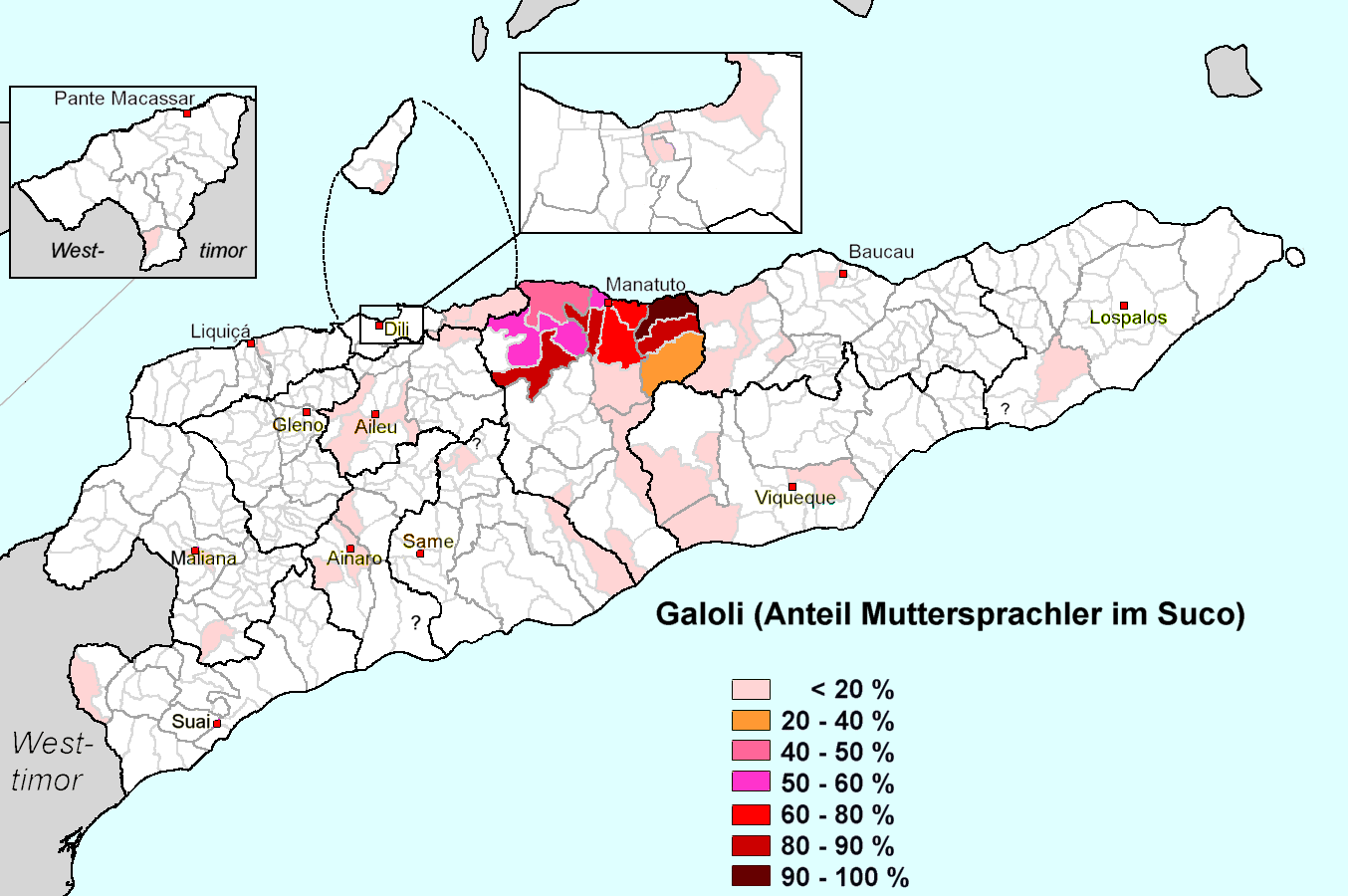
Galoli

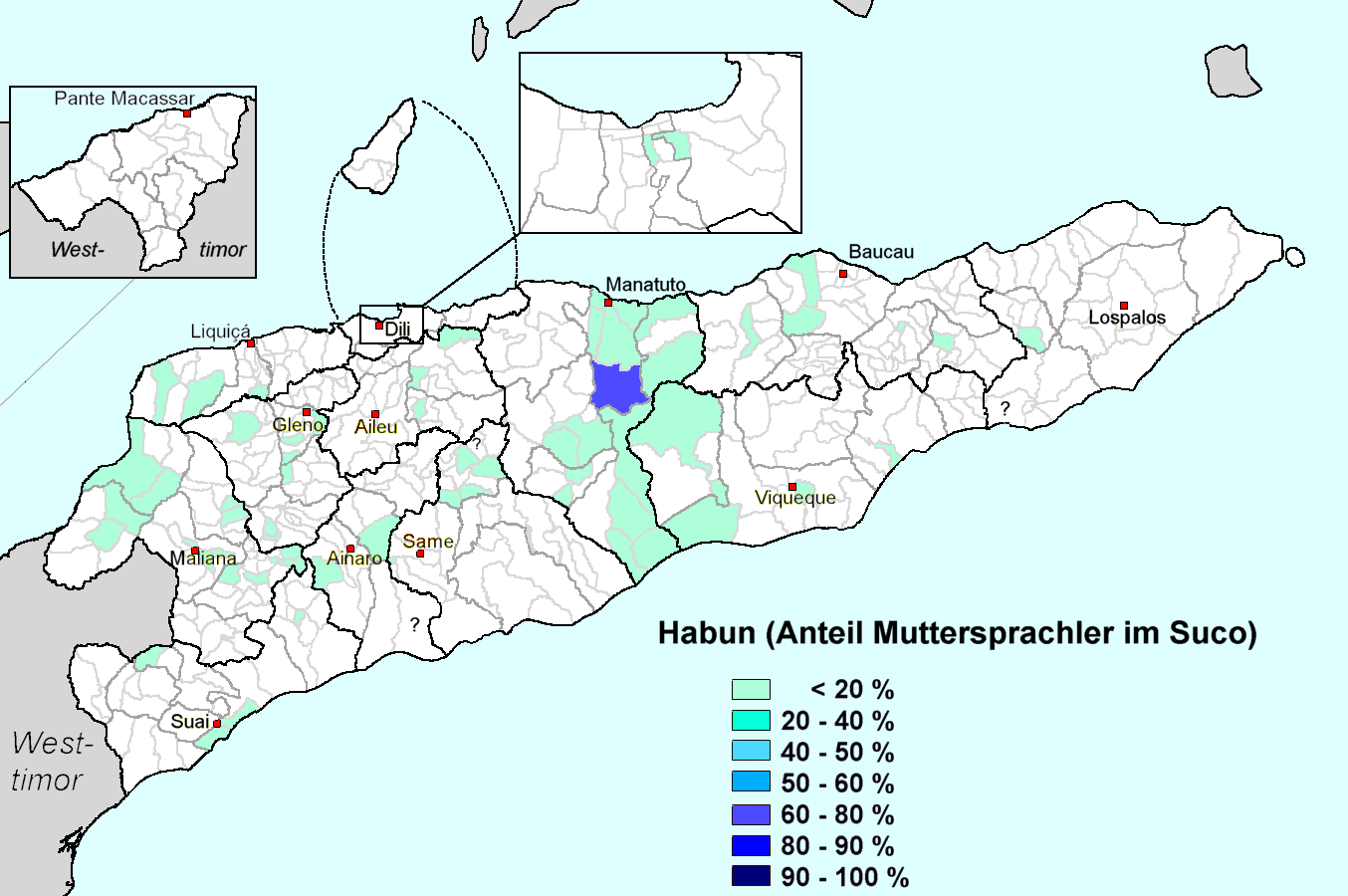
Habun

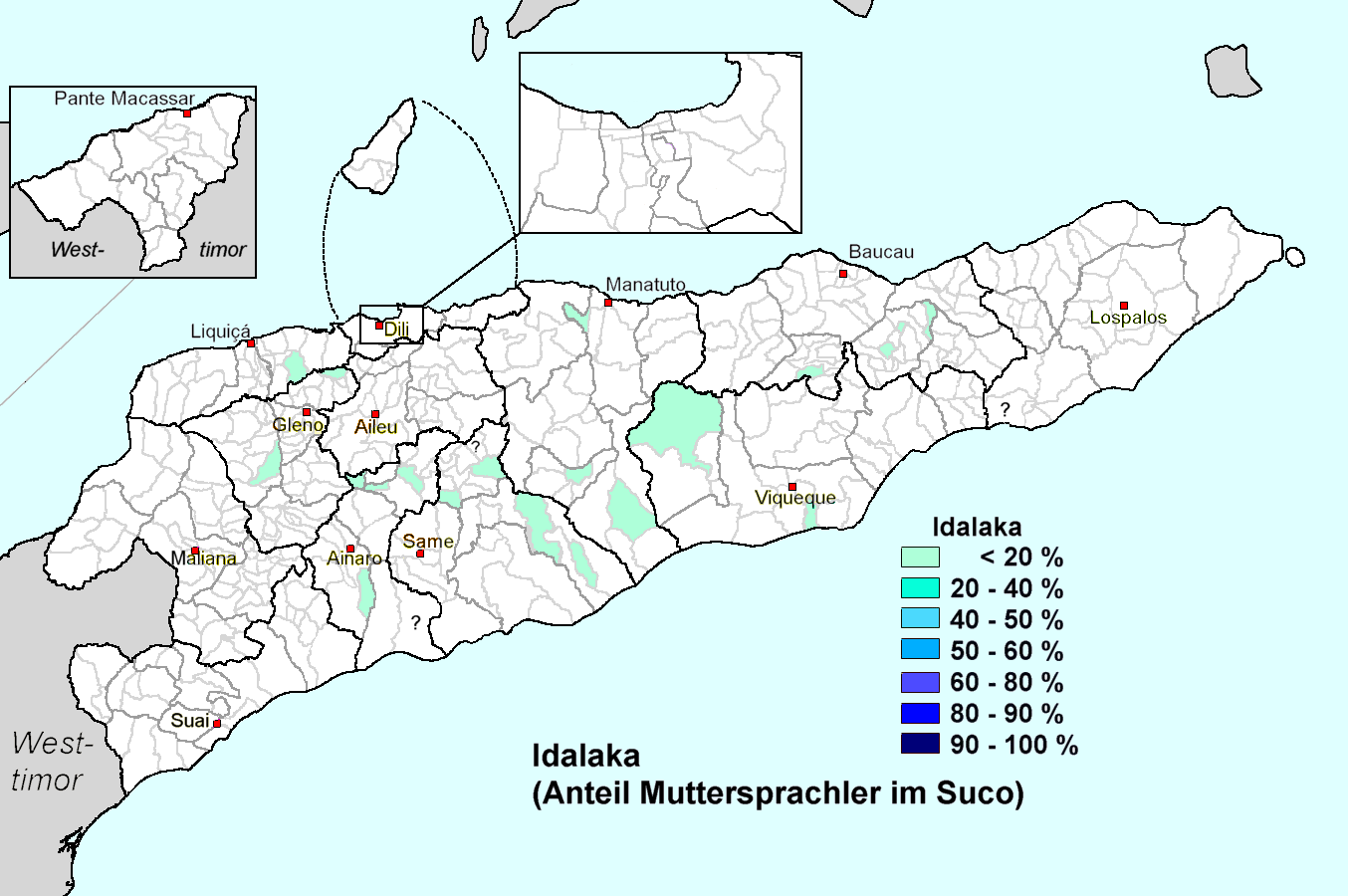
Idalaka

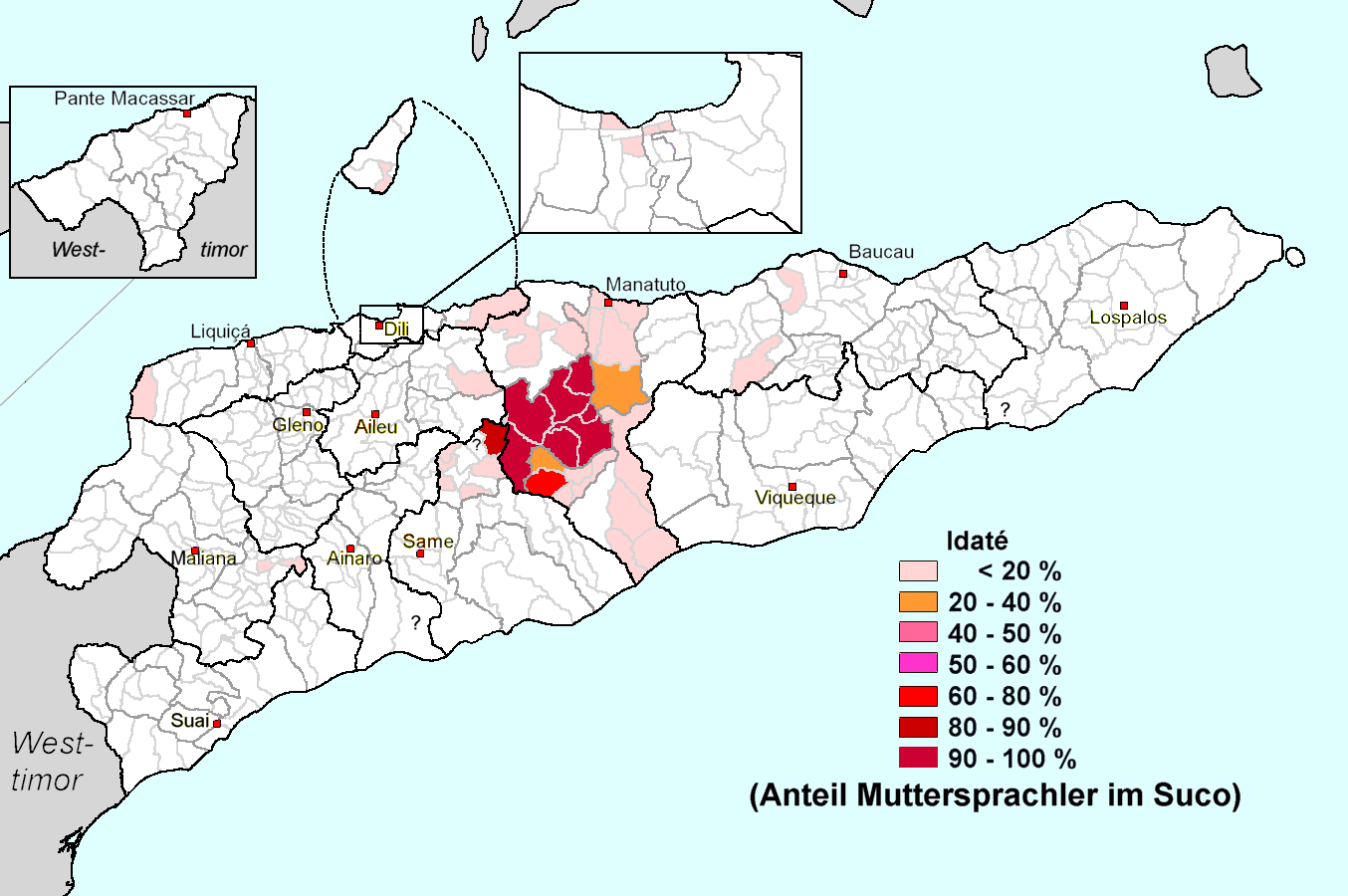
Idaté

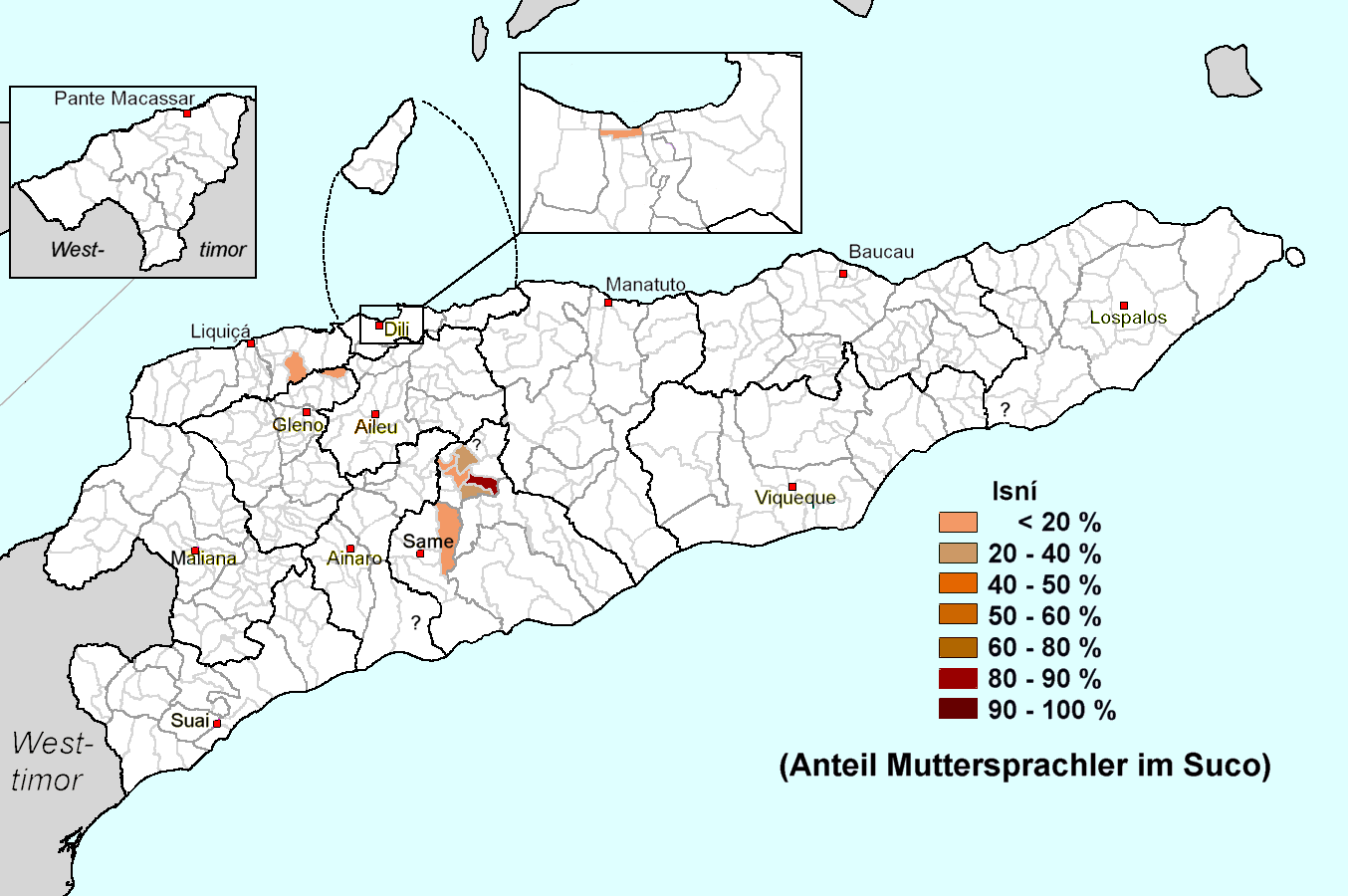
Isní

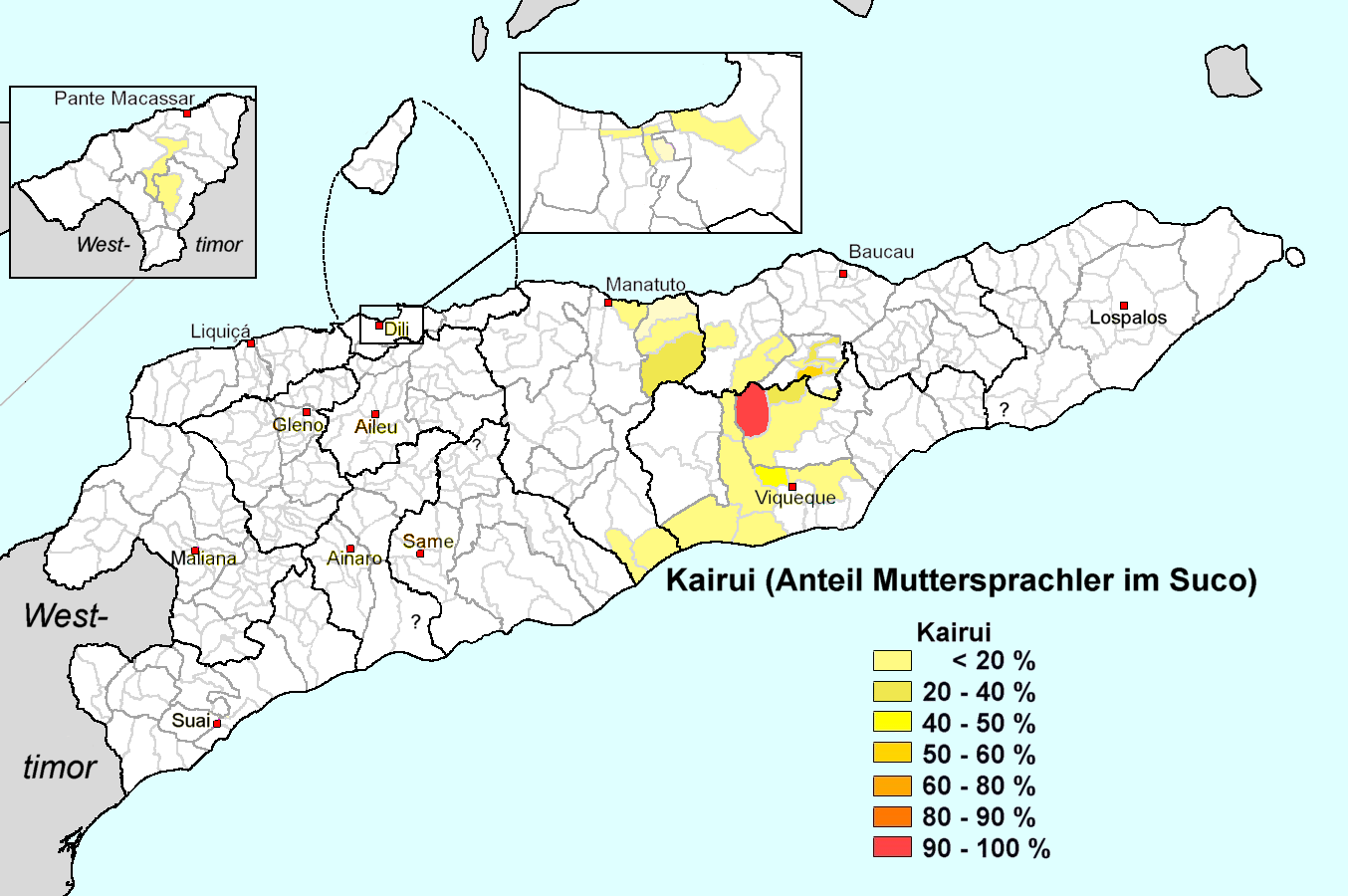
Kairui

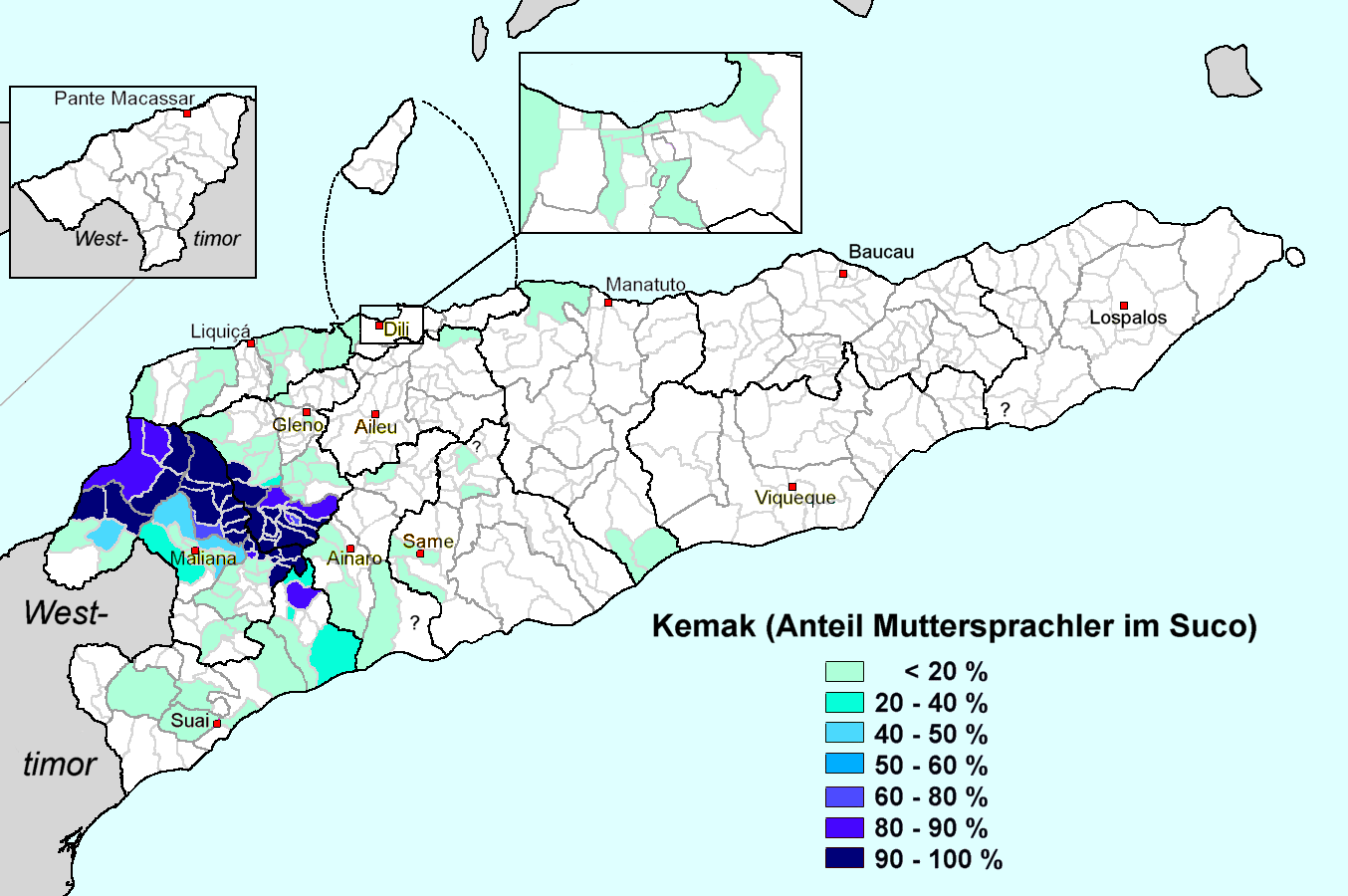
Kemak

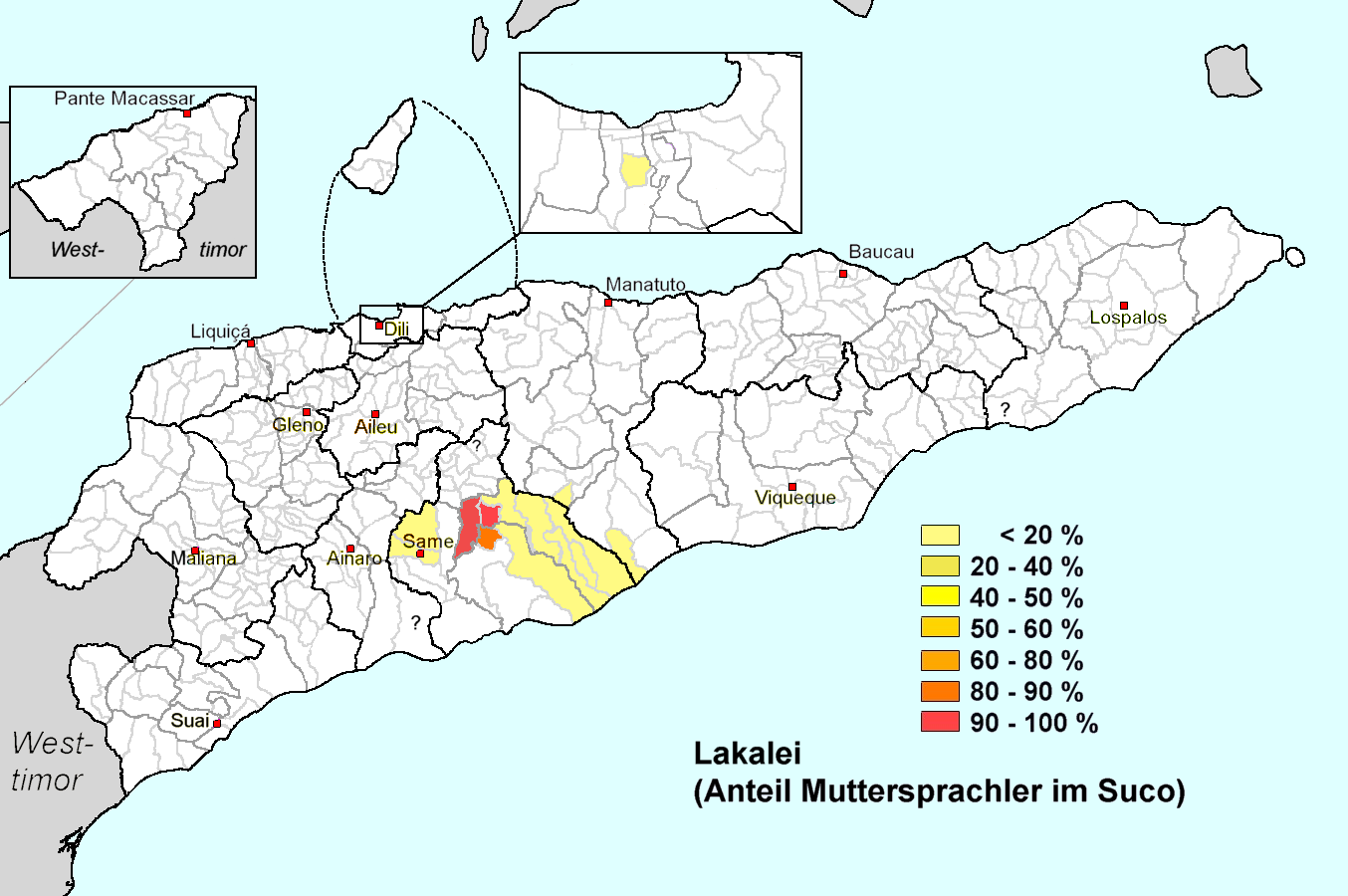
Lakalei

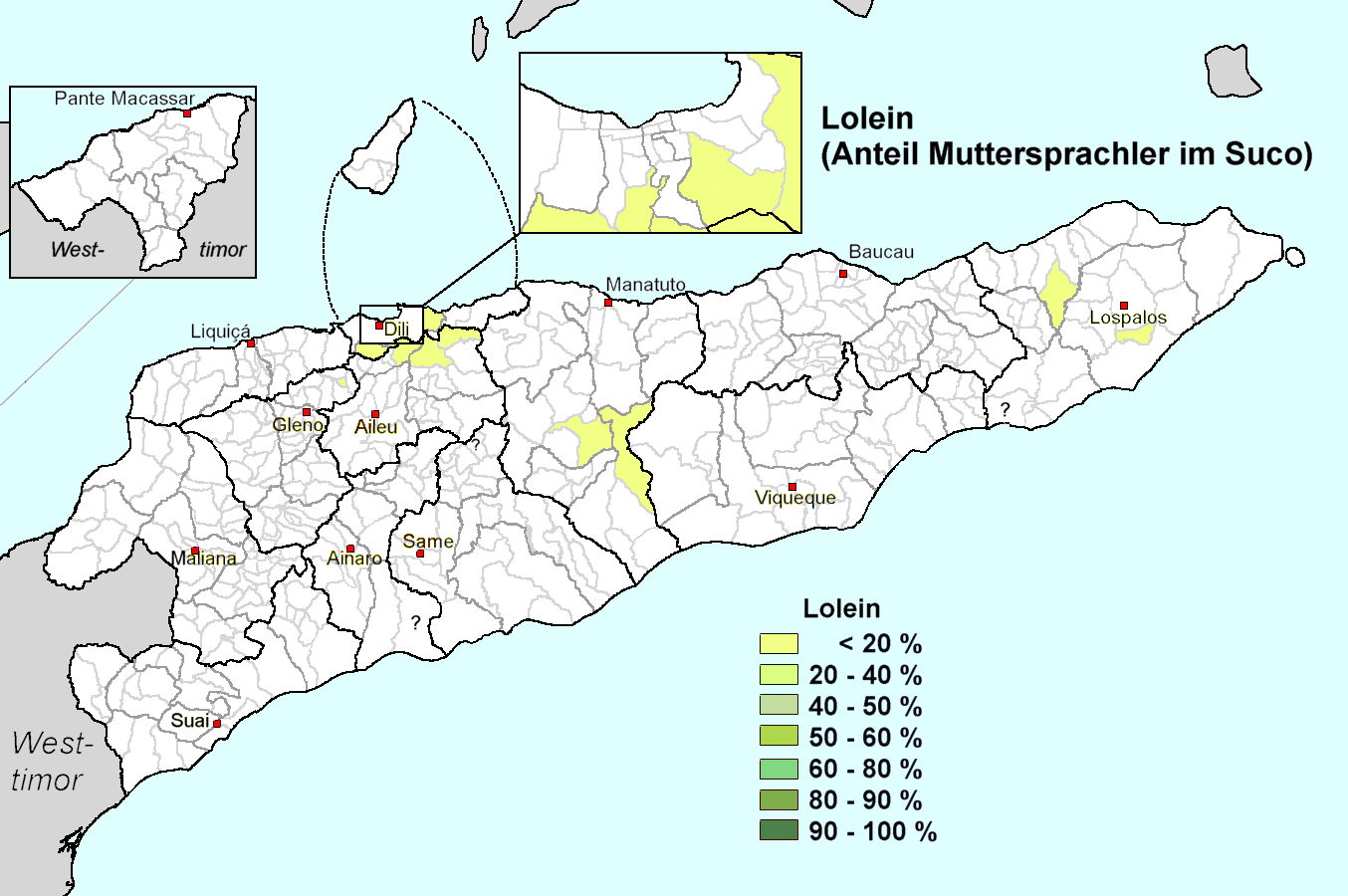
Lolein

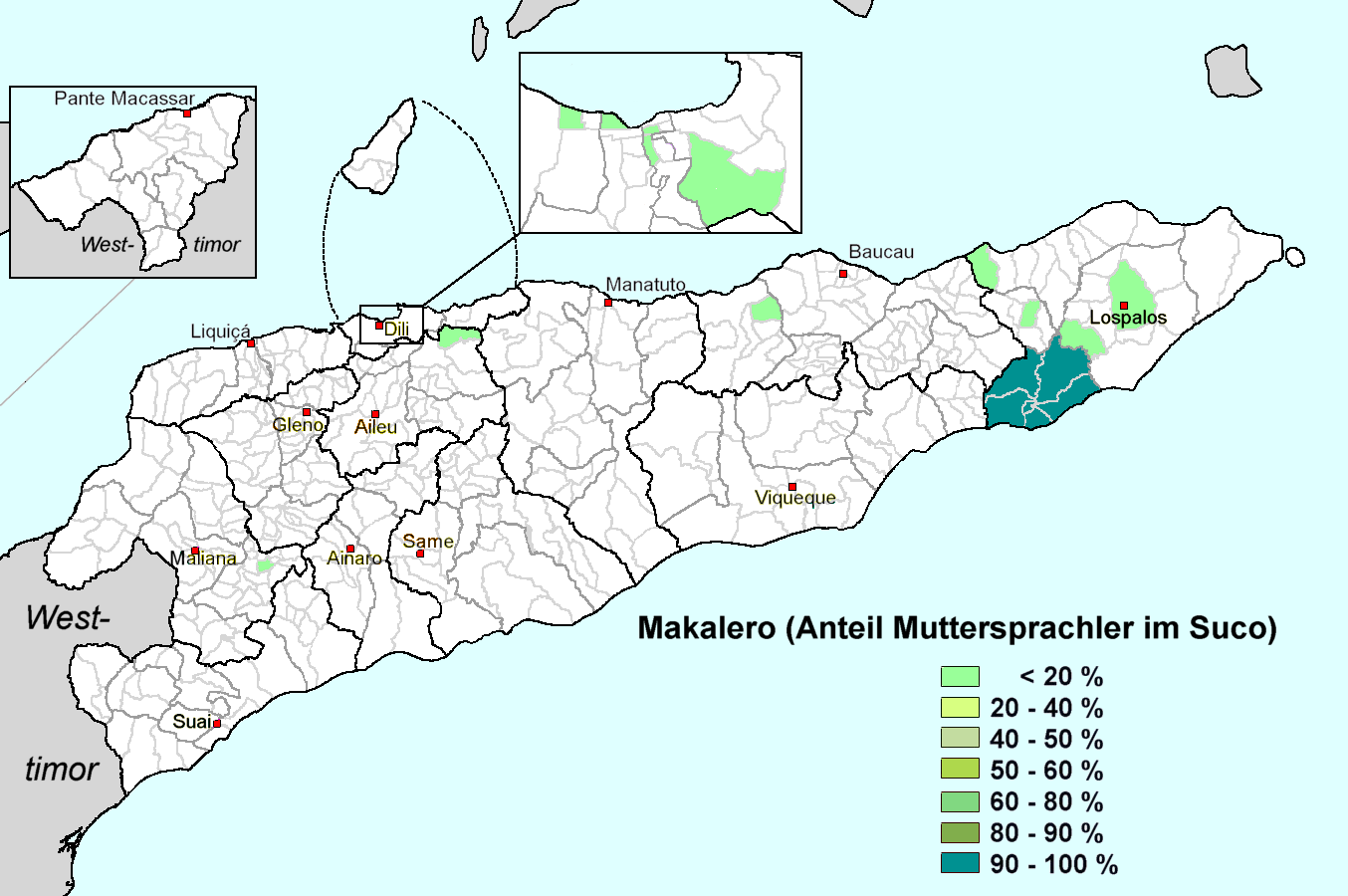
Makalero

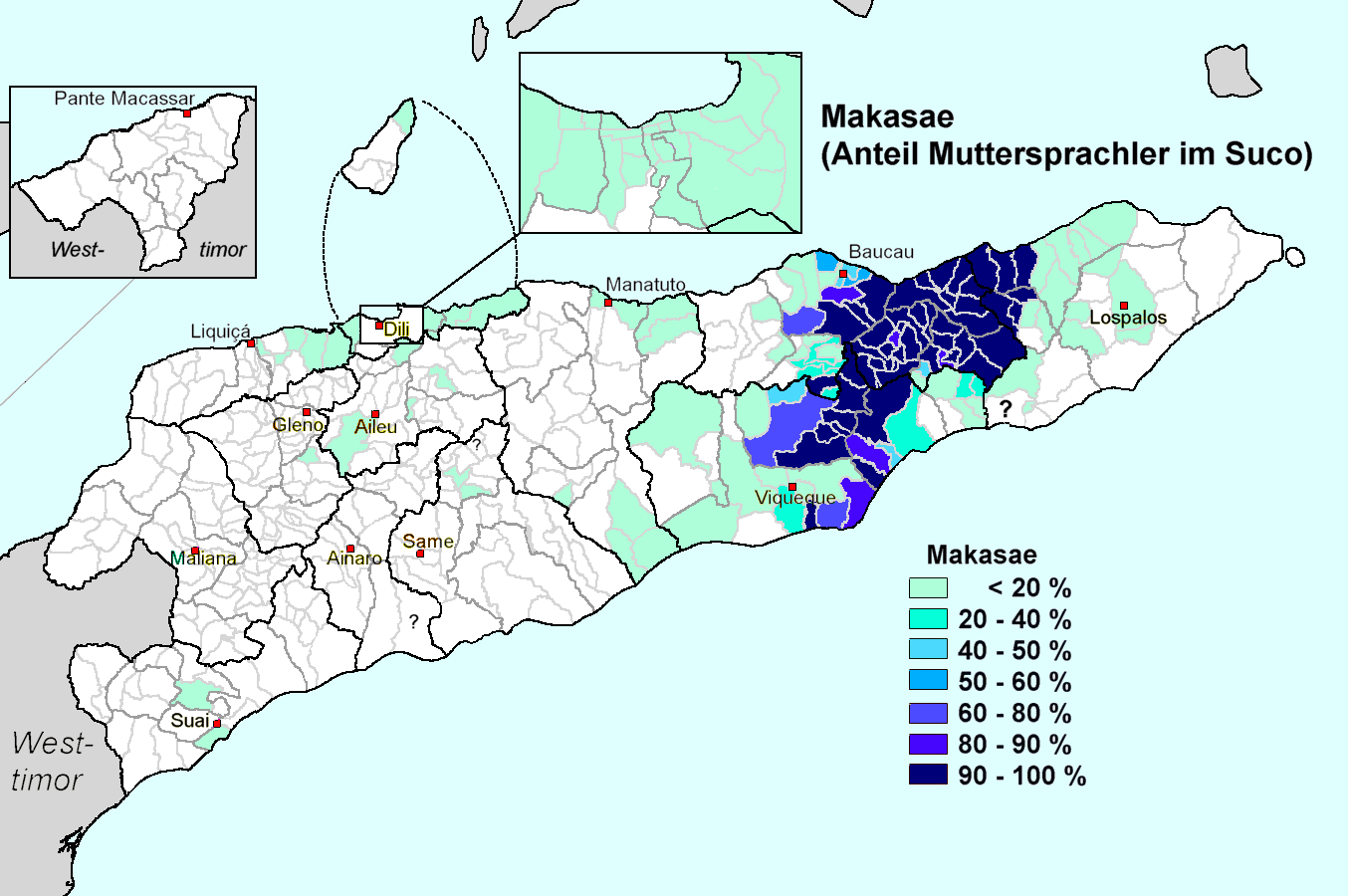
Makasae

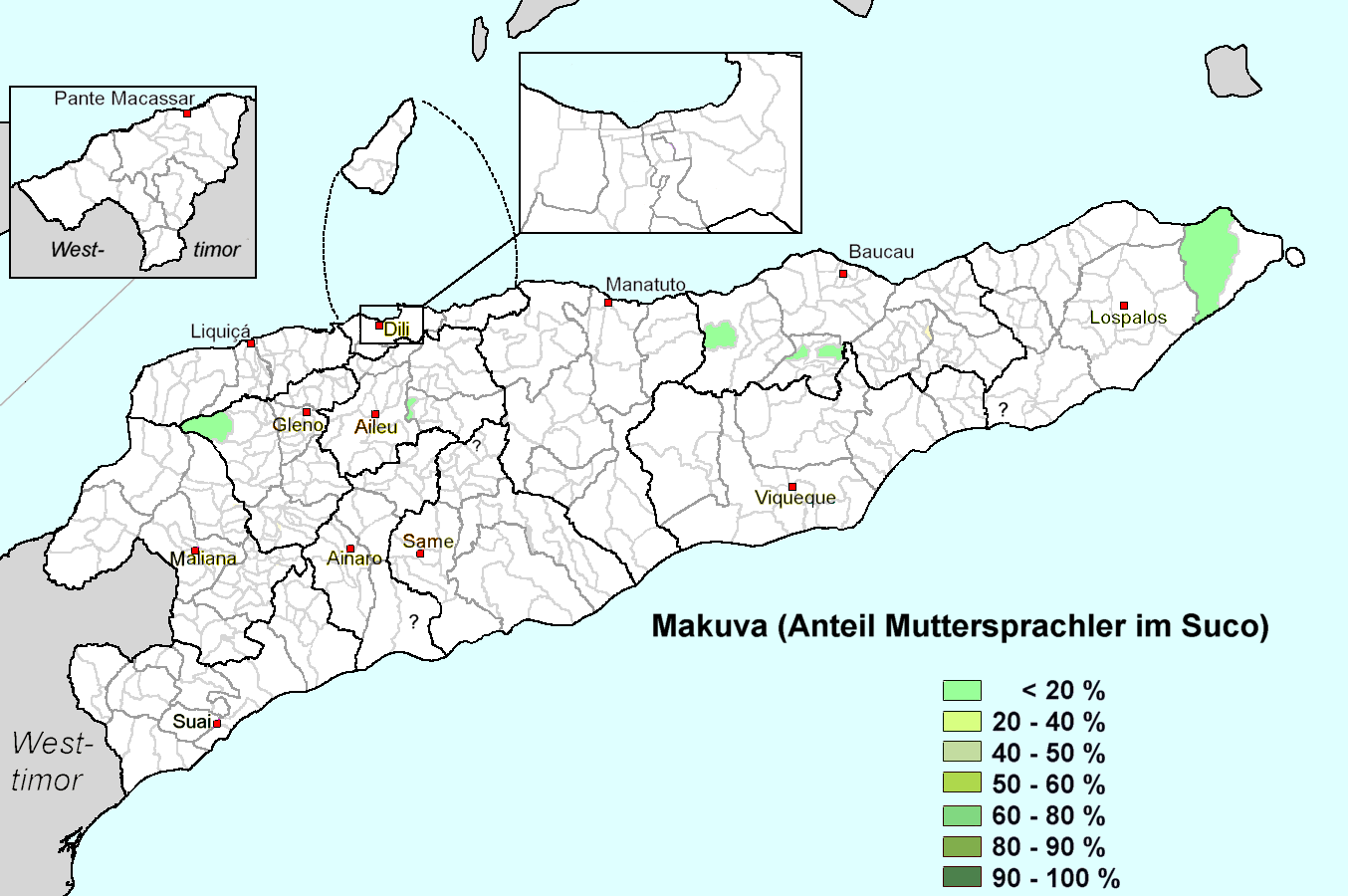
Makuva

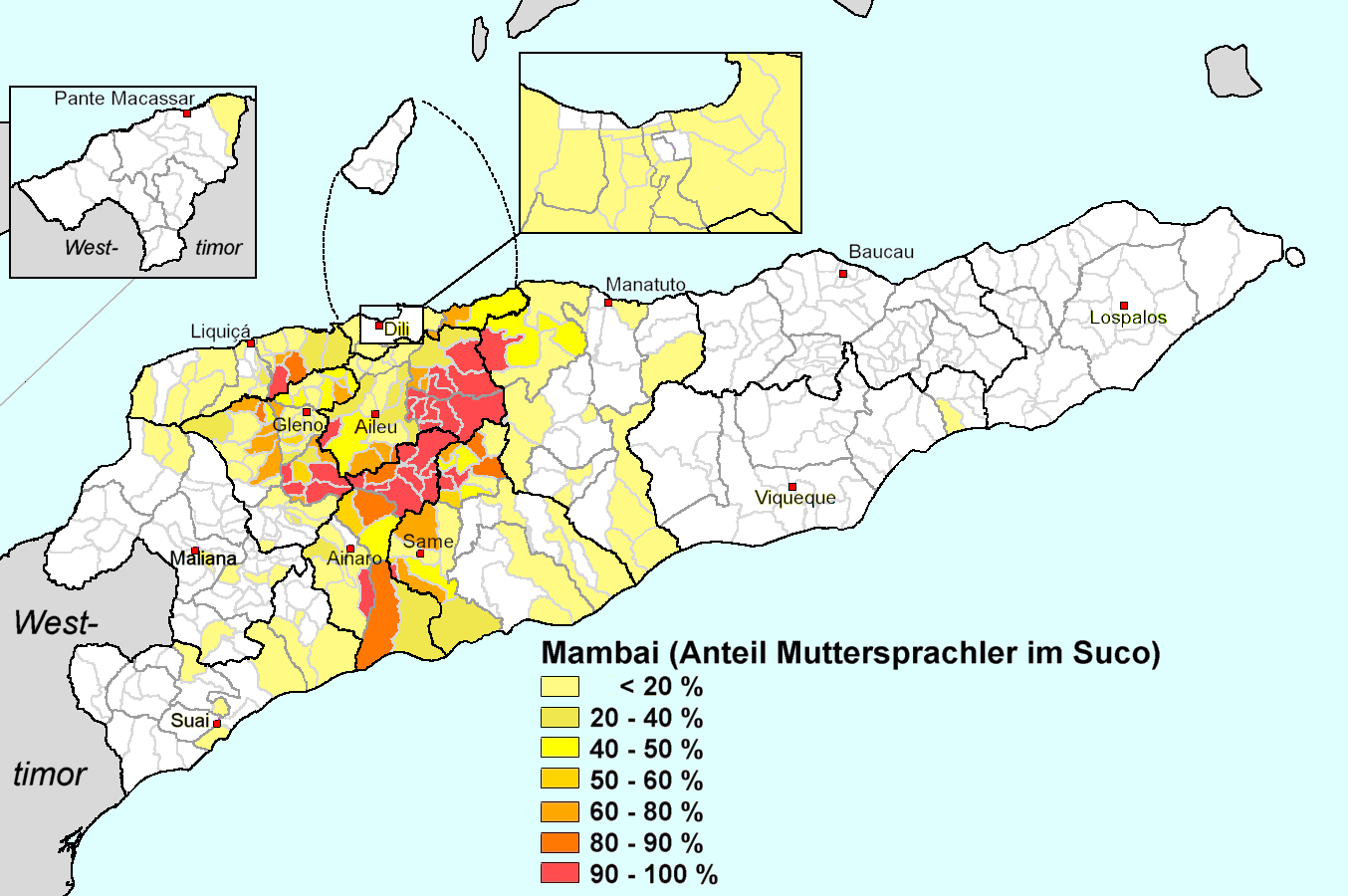
Mambai

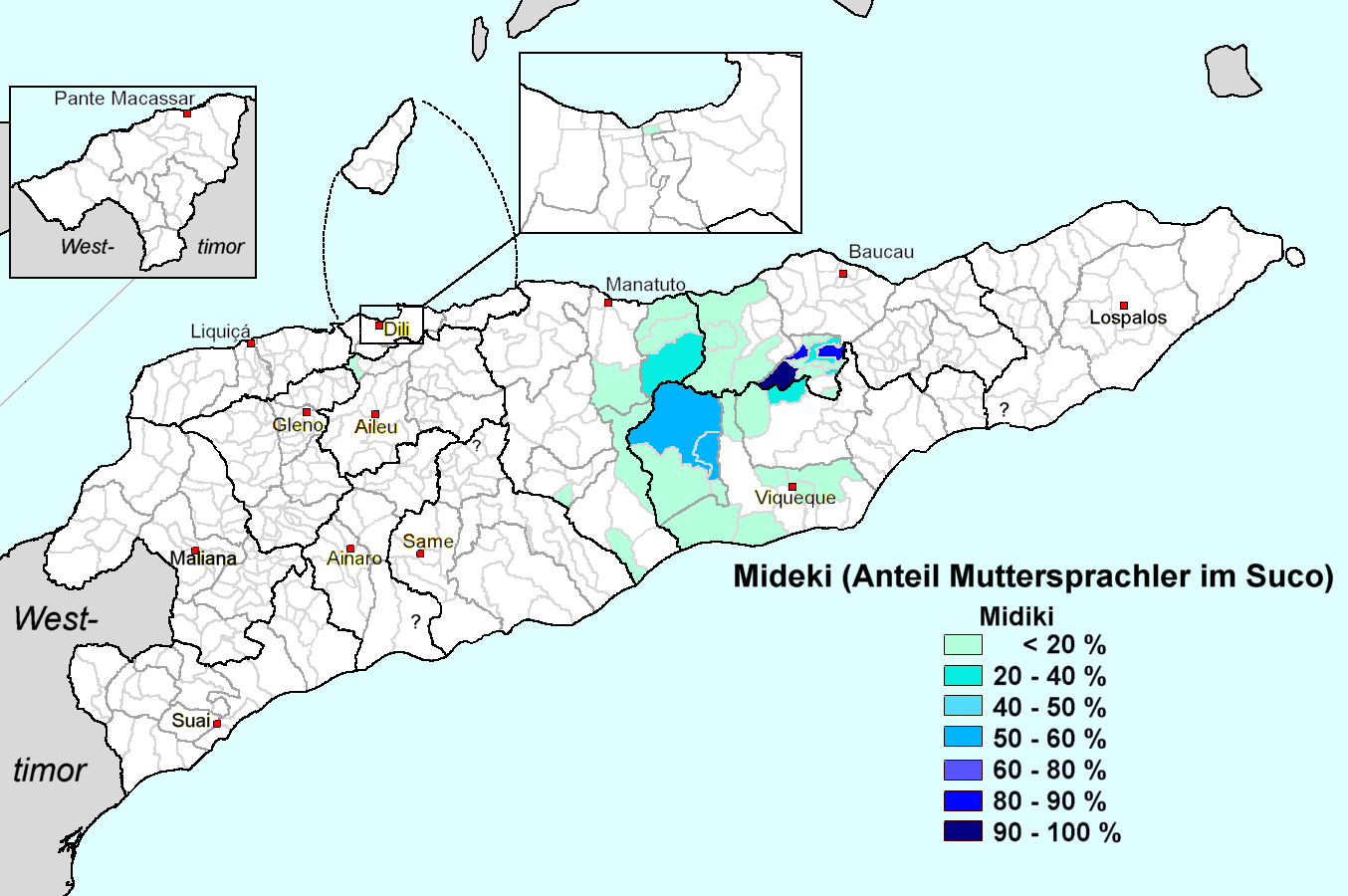
Midiki

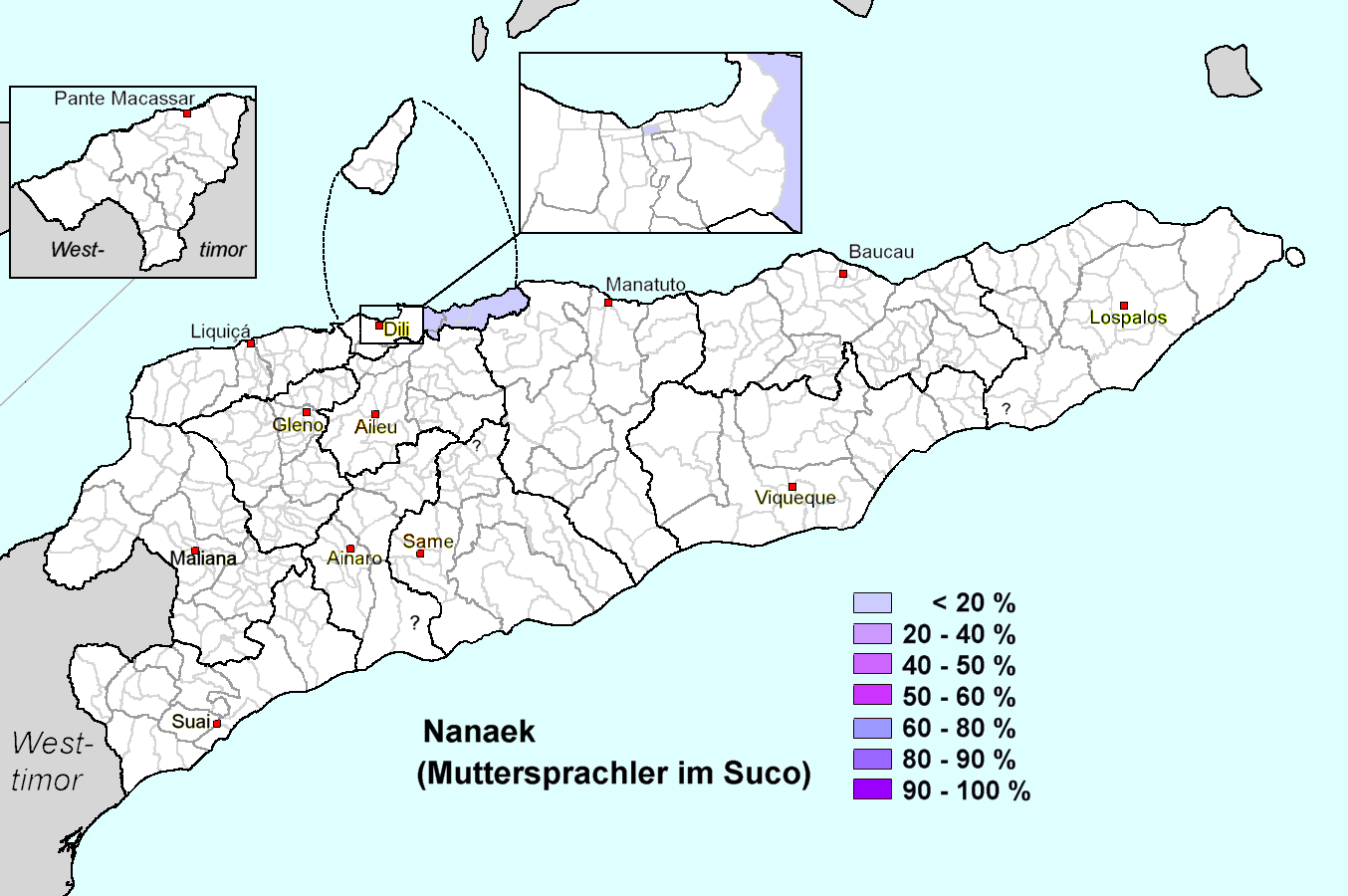
Nanaek

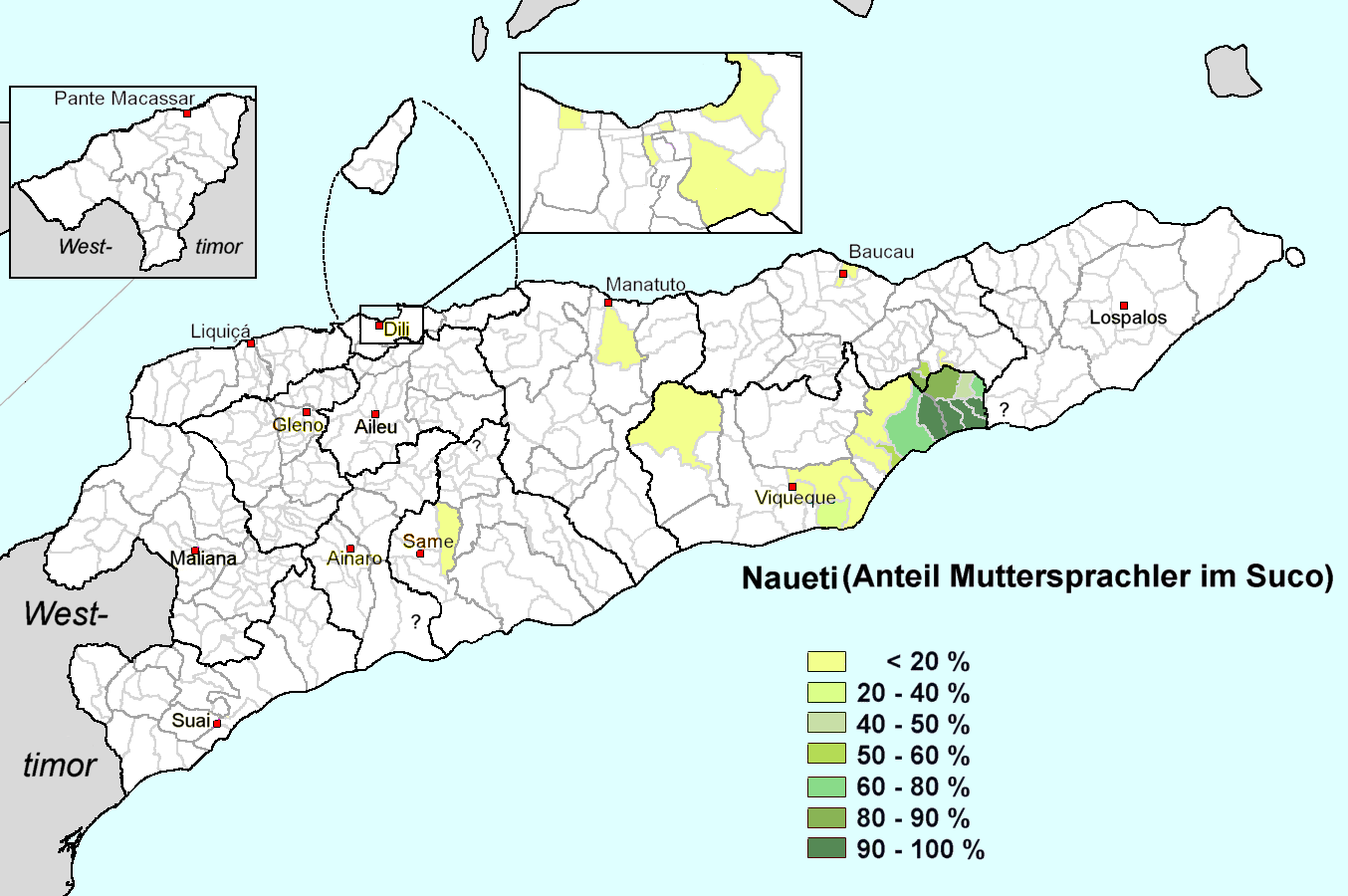
Naueti

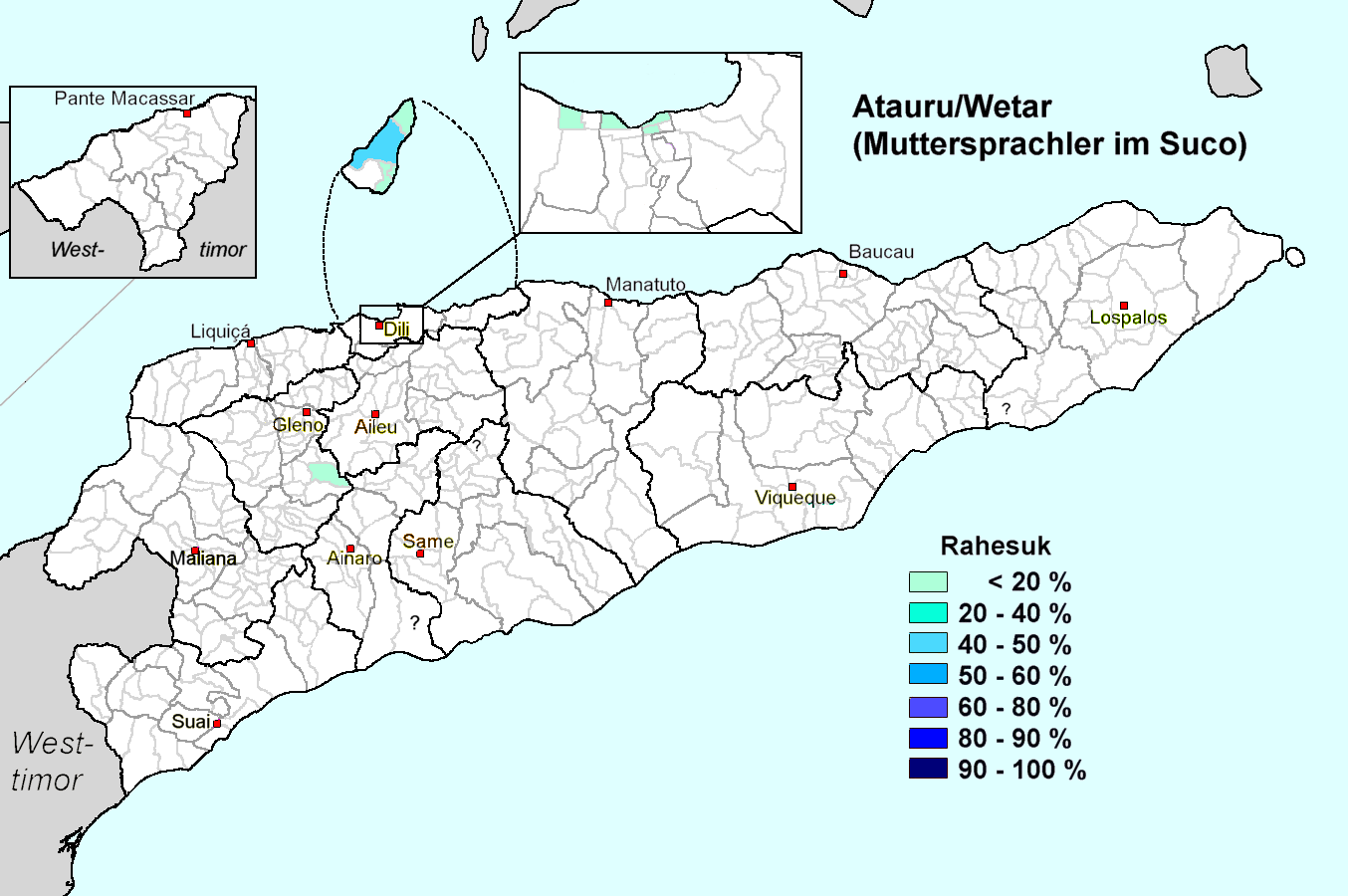
Rahesuk

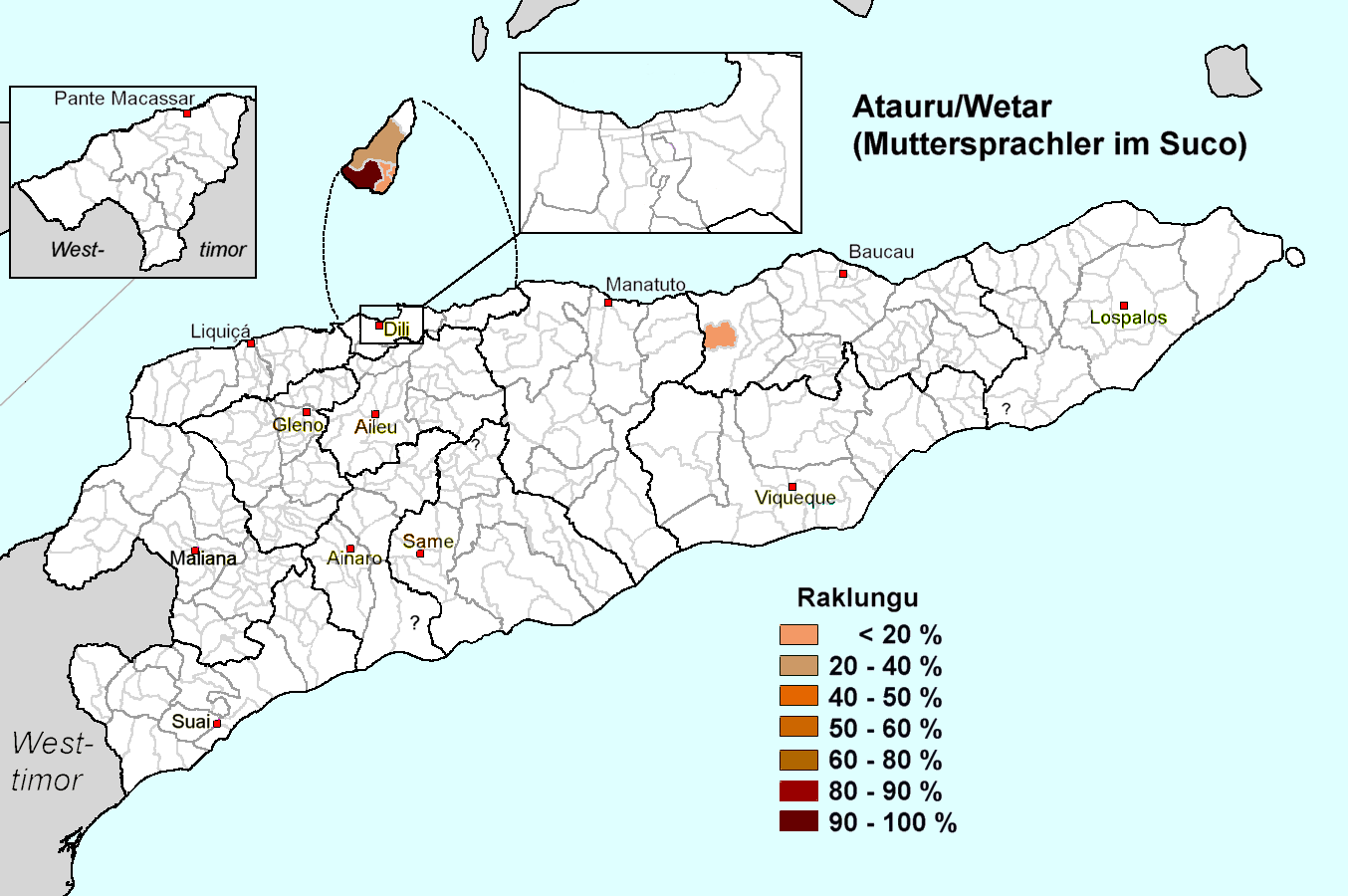
Raklungu

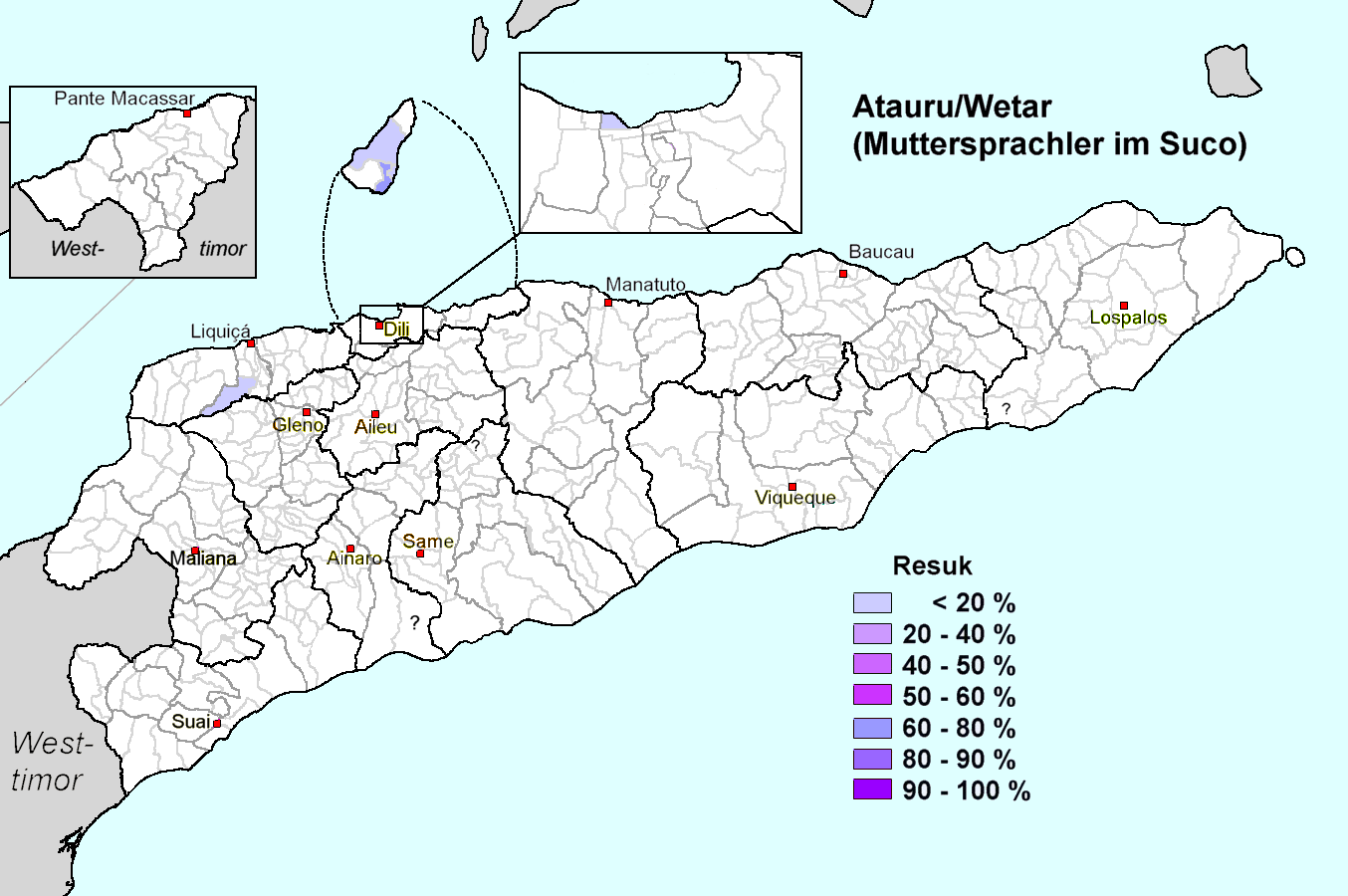
Resuk

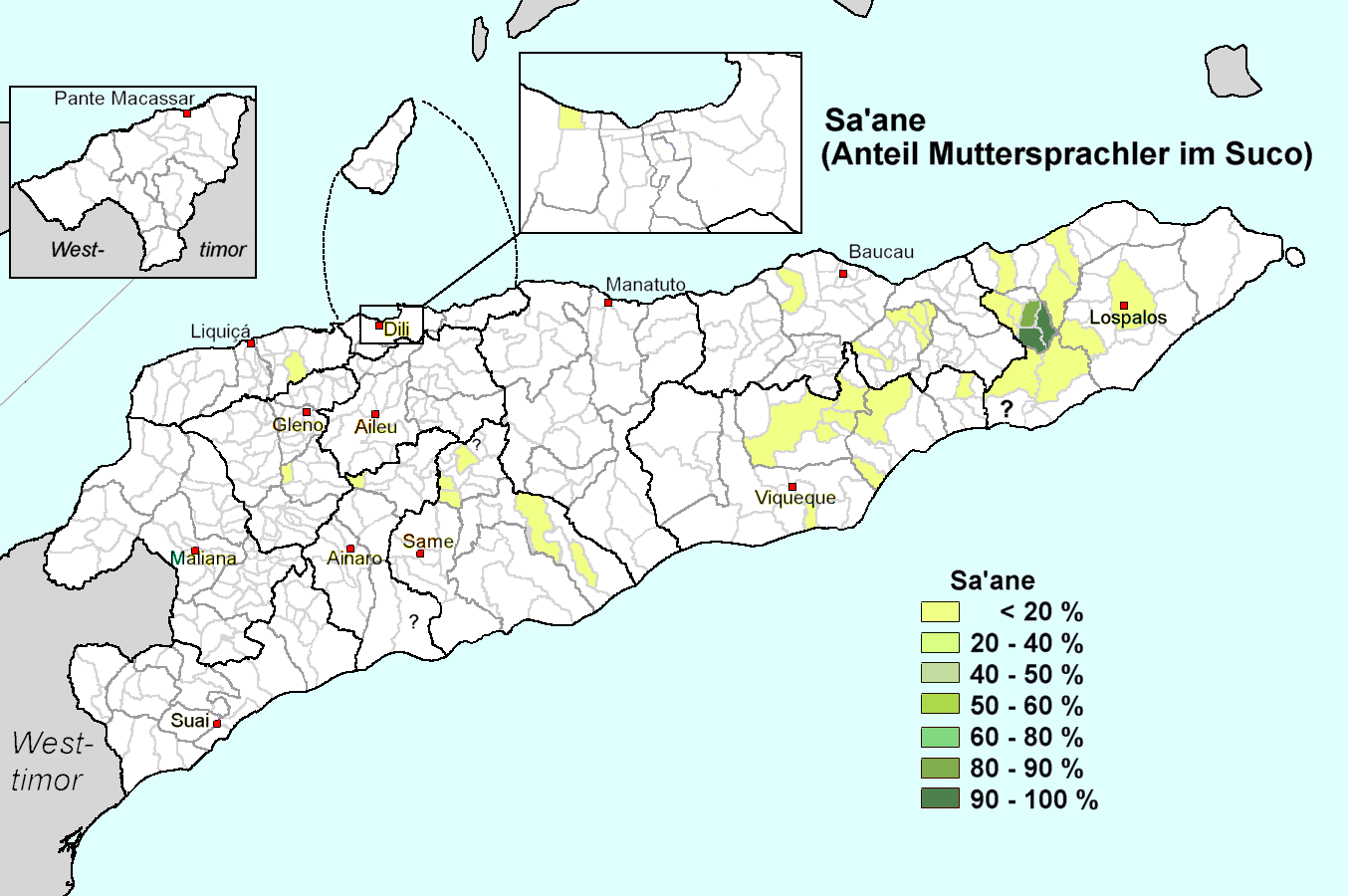
Sa'ane

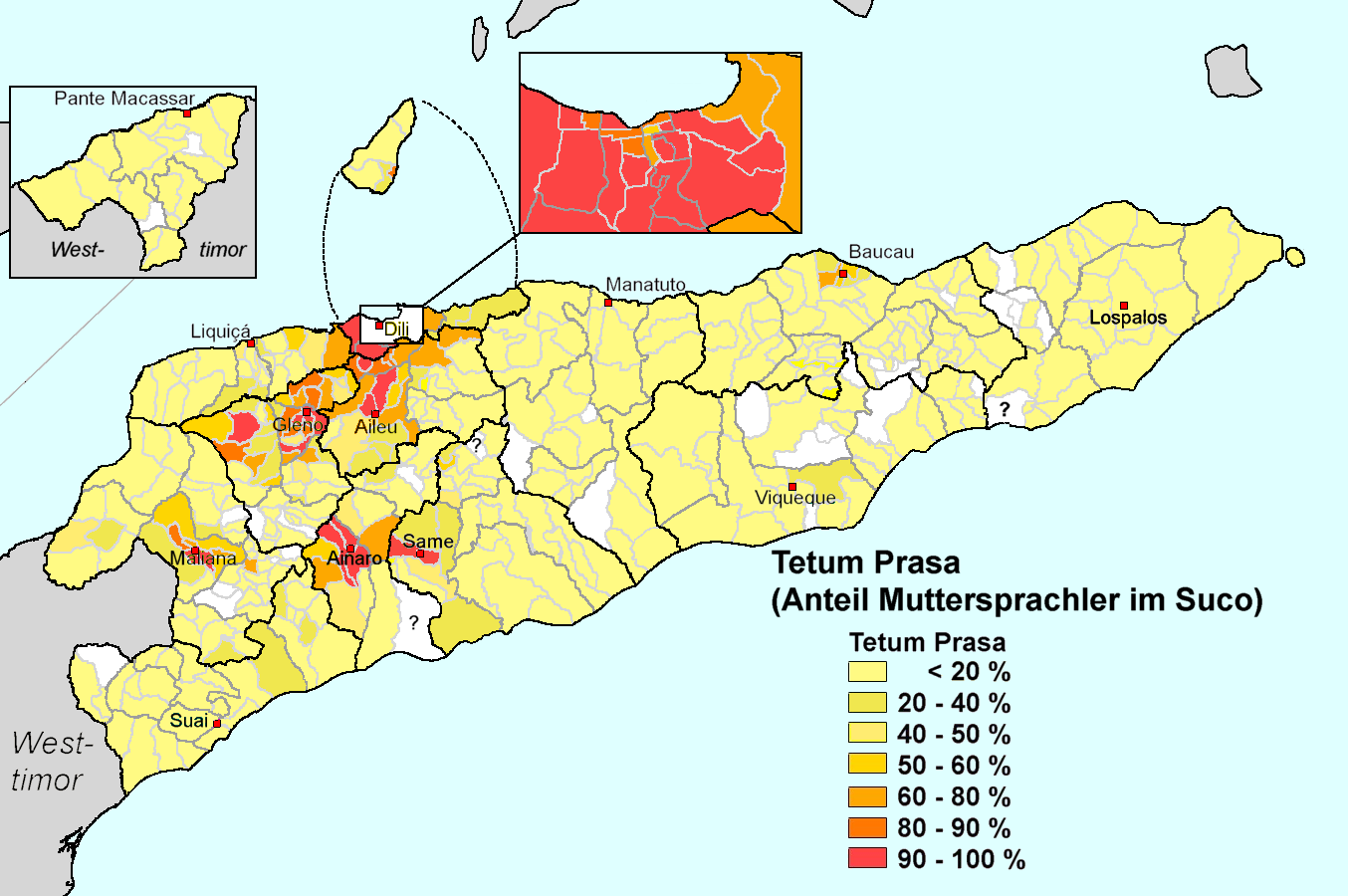
Tetun Prasa

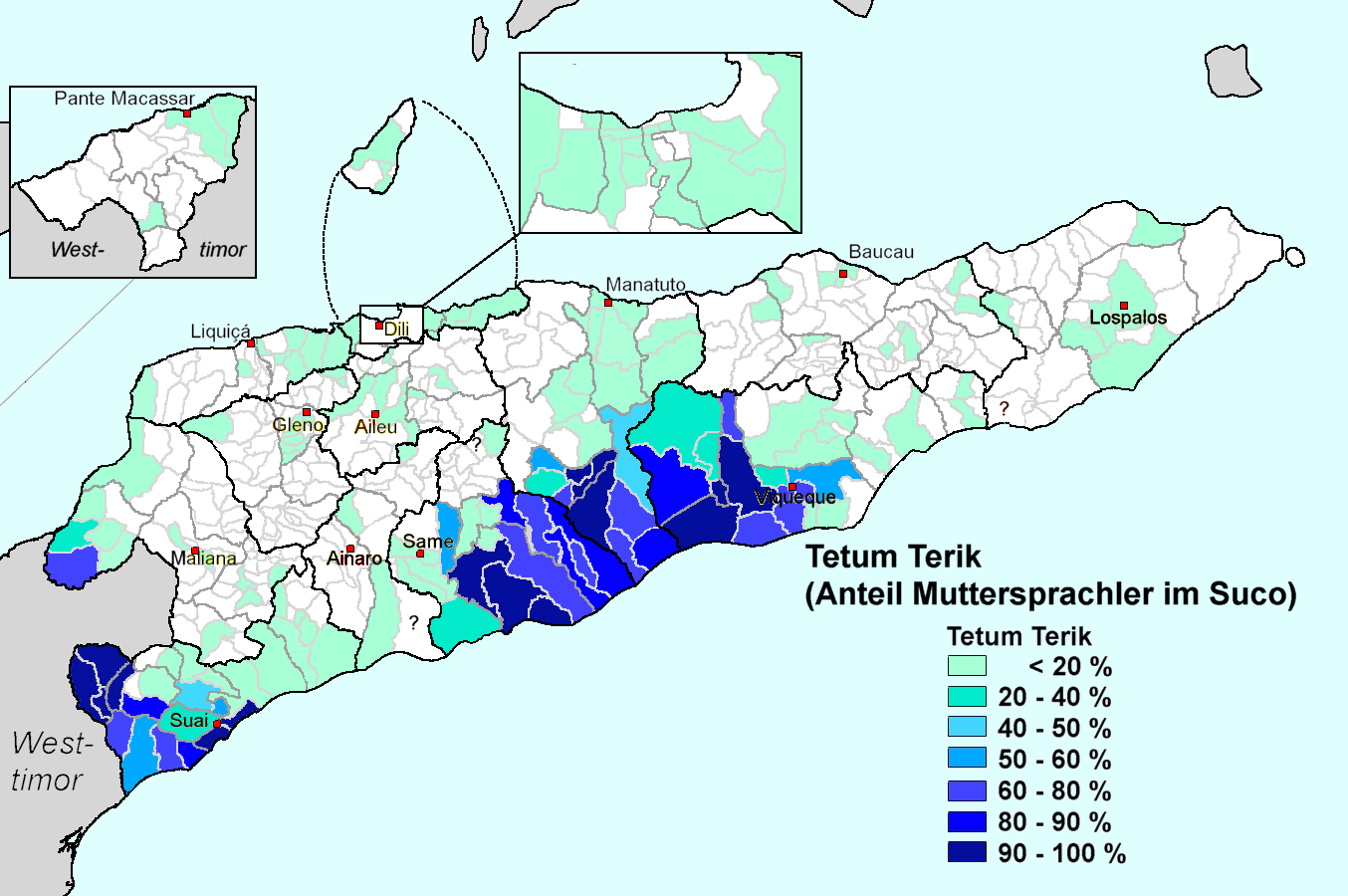
Tetun Terik

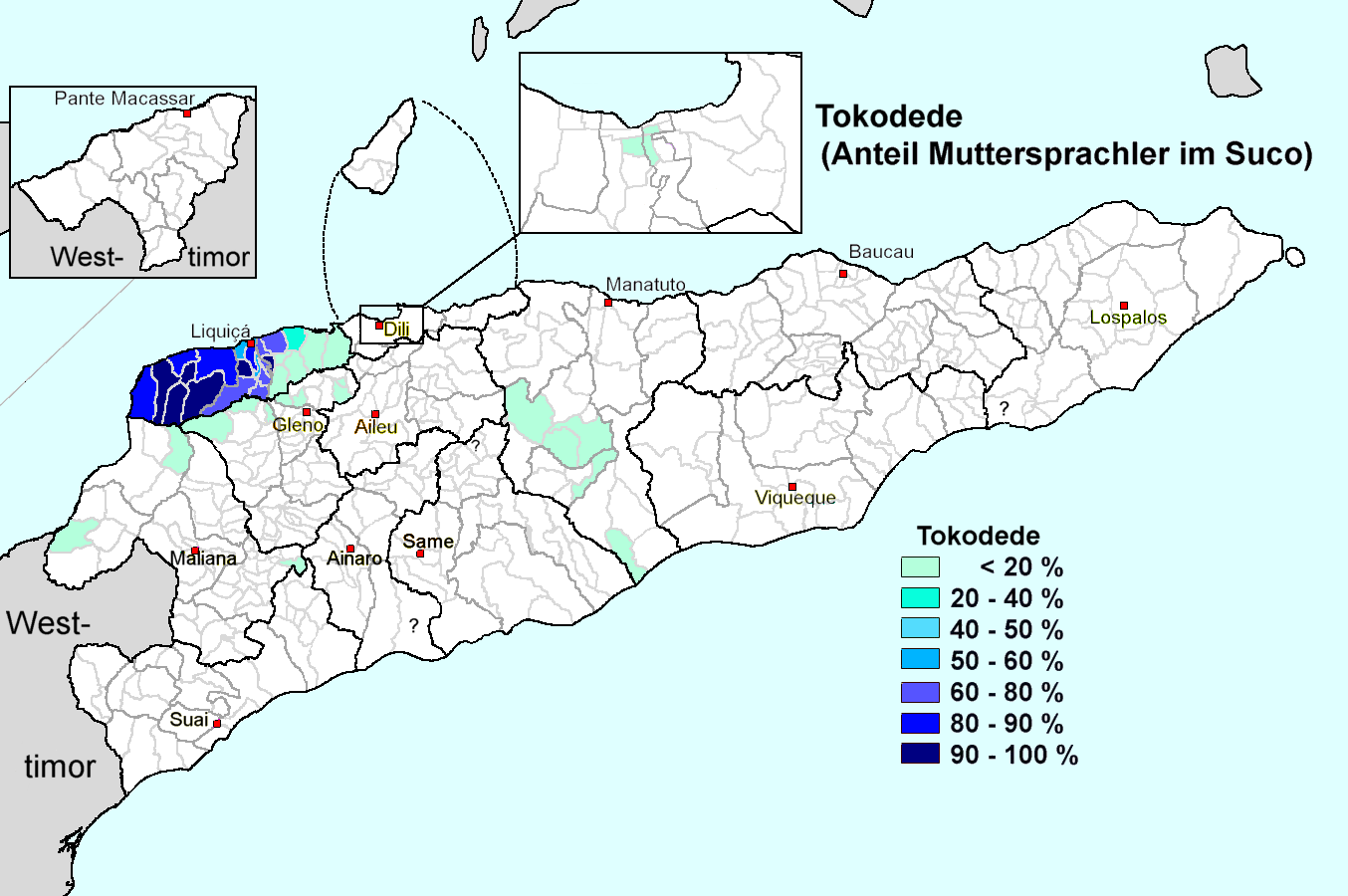
Tokodede

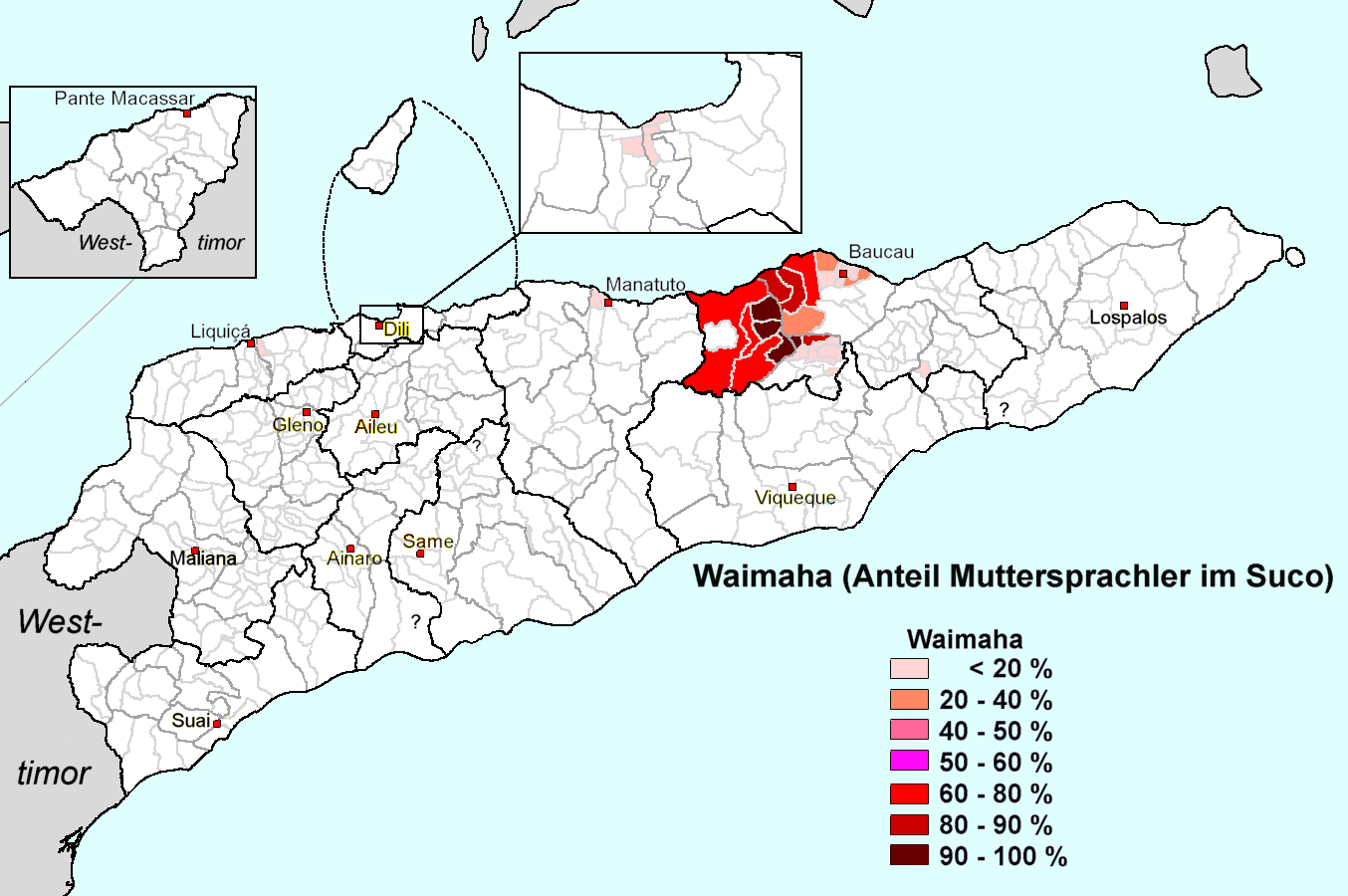
Waimaha
