= Welaun language =

Austronesian language

Welaun
- Bekais, Wekais
- Native to: Indonesia, Timor-Leste
- Native speakers: 2,000–5,575 (ca. 2006/2019)
- Language family: Austronesian: Malayo-Polynesian; Central Timor; Welaun

Official status
- Recognised minority language in: Timor-Leste

Language codes
- ISO 639-3: wlh
- Glottolog: wela1235
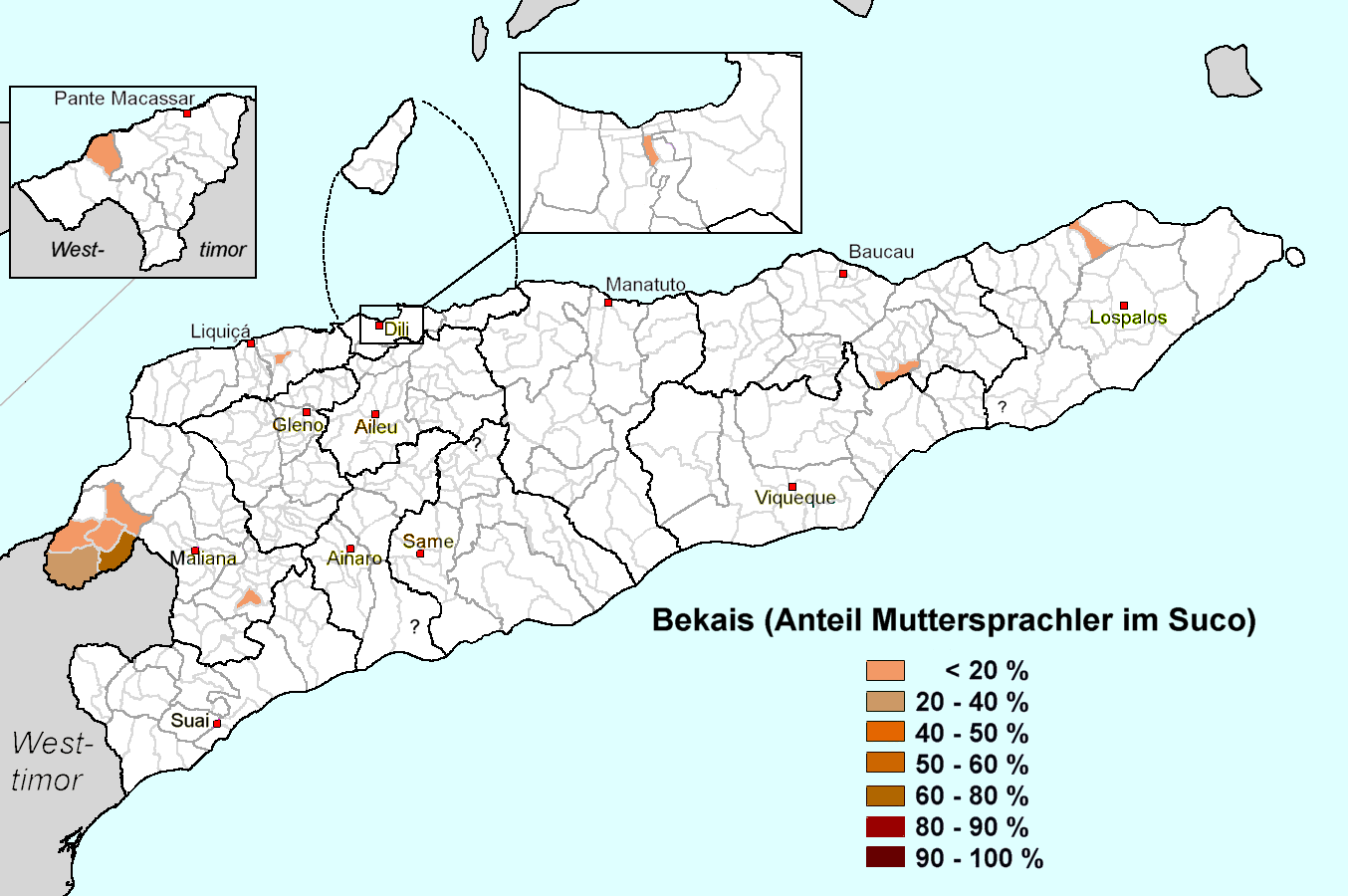
- Distribution of Welaun (Bekais) in East Timor (West Timor not shown)

Welaun (also known as Bekais or Wekais) is an Austronesian language spoken on the border of Timor-Leste and West Timor (a part of Indonesia). It is closely related to Tetun.

== Previous studies ==
Welaun was documented by Hull (2003) and Edwards (2019). Edwards (2019) estimates a speaker population of 5,575. A dictionary of Welaun has been written by da Silva (2012).

== Phonology ==
13 consonants
		Labial	Alveolar	Velar	Glottal
Nasal		m	n		
Plosive	voiceless		t	k	ʔ
Plosive	voiced	b	d		ʔ
Fricative		f	s		h
Approximant			l		w
Trill			r		

It has five vowels: /i e a o u/
