= Helong people =

Indigenous people of Timor, Indonesia

Regions with significant populations
- Indonesia (Kupang Regency, Semau Island, Flores Island)

Languages
- Helong, Kupang Malay, and Indonesia

Religion
- Christianity (predominantly)

Related ethnic groups
- Atoni • Dhao • Rotenese

Helong people are one of the indigenous inhabitants of Timor Island in Indonesia. Most of them live in Kupang Regency, namely in West Kupang and Central Kupang; and some also settled in Flores Island and Semau Island. Their livelihoods are mainly farming, hunting, fishing, and making traditional crafts.

They speak a native language called Helong, which has two dialects, the Helong Semau dialect and the Eastern Land Helong dialect. Helong speakers are found in four villages on the South-Western coast of West Timor, as well as on Semau Island, a small island just off the coast of West Timor.

The basic Helong family system is a nuclear family, which then joins into a limited larger family (ngalo). Some ngalo joins to form a clan (ingu) which is led by a clan leader (koka ana). In terms of social strata, the traditional Helong community was divided into three layers, the nobility (usif), ordinary people (tob), and slaves (ata).

== Notable people ==
- Viktor Laiskodat

== See also ==
- Helong language
- Kupang
