= AAZ =

AAZ or Aaz may refer to:

- Quetzaltenango Airport in Quetzaltenango Department, Guatemala (IATA airport code AAZ)
- Amarasi language, a Malayo-Polynesian language of Indonesia
- 1.9 R4 TD 55kW, a discontinued automobile engine; see the list of discontinued Volkswagen Group diesel engines
- Zalsupindole, a nonhallucinogenic psychoplastogen
