= Semau =

Indonesian island

Coordinates: 10°13′S 123°22′E

Pusmau, Pasar Pusmau
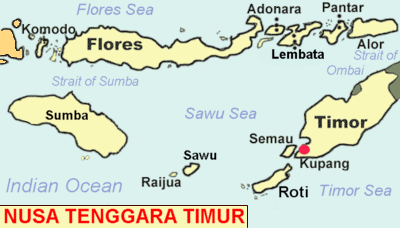
- Map showing the Semau island
- Interactive map of Semau
- Etymology: Indonesian for "all, everything"

Geography
- Location: Savu Sea
- Archipelago: Lesser Sunda Islands
- Adjacent to: Timor
- Area: 143 km^{2} (55 sq mi)
- Length: 30 km (19 mi)
- Coastline: 116 km (72.1 mi)
- Highest elevation: 157 m (515 ft)

Administration
- Indonesia
- Province: East Nusa Tenggara
- Regency: Kupang

Demographics
- Population: 8,097 (2008)
- Pop. density: 56/km^{2} (145/sq mi)
- Languages: Helong
- Ethnic groups: Helong people

Additional information
- Time zone: Central Indonesia Time (UTC+8)

Semau, also known as Pusmau and Pasar Pusmau, is an island in the Lesser Sunda Islands in Indonesia. It is located 20 miles off the harbor of Kupang. The inhabitants of Semau are the Helong people, who some believe are the original inhabitants of the Kupang area. It is a supplier of firewood and charcoal and grows corn, watermelon, and mango. Semau is also used as a holiday village where snorkeling, swimming, and other water sports are popular.
