= Amarasi language =

Timoric language spoken in West Timor

Amarasi
- Native to: Indonesia
- Region: West Timor
- Native speakers: 70,000 (2011)
- Language family: Austronesian: Malayo-Polynesian; Central–Eastern?; Central?; Timoric; Rote–Meto; West Rote–Meto; Meto–Amarasi; Amarasi

Language codes
- ISO 639-3: aaz
- Glottolog: amar1273
- ELP: Amarasi

Amarasi is a Central Malayo-Polynesian language of West Timor, and is spoken by the Amarasi. The Amarasi language has about 80,000 native speakers, with four main dialects called Ro'is, Kotos, Tais Nonof, and Ketun, though many differences exist between individual villages. Speakers are interspersed with those of Helong.

== Classification ==
Amarasi is a Malayo-Polynesian language with strong Melanesian roots, and additional Dutch and Portuguese influences. It belongs to a language group known as Timoric (sometimes Timor-Babar) that includes all the languages spoken on the island of Timor, as well as the nearby islands of Wetar and Babar. The most common languages in the Timor-Babar language group are Uab Meto (previously known as Dawan) on the western half of the island, and Tetum on the eastern half of the island. These languages have over a million speakers between them. Most Timoric languages are separated into east and west because of the island's conflicted colonial history beginning in the early 16th century.

In 1998, Australian linguist Geoffrey Hull classified Amarasi as a dialect of Uab Meto, rather than its own separate language. However, beginning in the mid-2000s, as linguists began to study the differences between Uab Meto and its "dialects," it was understood that there was low mutual intelligibility between the Uab Meto varieties, due mostly to vastly differing grammar structures and foreign language influences (such as Dutch and Portuguese in Amarasi), and so many linguists now recognize the Uab Meto varieties to be independent languages belonging to a common Uab Meto language chain.

== History ==
=== Precolonial contact ===
The island of Timor is thought to have been settled in three waves. The first wave to arrive on the island were the Vedo-Australoide roughly 40,000-20,000 BCE, near the end of the fourth and final global glacier period, when much of Indonesia was a continuous body of land, and Timor was much closer to other islands in the archipelago. The second wave is thought to have come from Melanesia, specifically from Papua New-Guinea, Vanuatu, and the Salomon Islands, around 3,000 BCE. The Melanesian people had well-developed agriculture, so they could explore the surrounding ocean better than other oceanic people's at the time. The Melanesian languages Fataluco, Macaçai, and Búnac are still spoken in some parts of East and West Timor to this day. The third and final pre-colonial wave, known as the Proto-Malay, came to Timor from Southern China and Northern Indochina around 2,500 BCE. The Proto-Malay populated most of modern-day Indonesia.

=== Postcolonial contact ===
Timor was contacted by the Portuguese in 1515, and claimed as a territory of Portugal in 1520. The Dutch East India Company settled the west end of the island in 1640, pushing the Portuguese out and to the east side of the island. The Dutch government officially acknowledged their occupation in 1799, and an unsteady border was formed, separating the two sides. A treaty between the Portuguese and the Dutch was signed in 1859, and reformed in 1893, but it was not until as late as 1914 when the treaty was finalized and border disputes were finally laid to rest. Shortly after, in 1942, both sides of Timor were conquered by Empire of Japan during its invasion of the pacific. Timor participated in the Indonesian Interdependence cause, and joined the Republic of Indonesia in 1949. East Timor voted to leave the republic in 1999, becoming the first new sovereign nation of the 21st century.

=== Amarasi in Timor ===
Dialects of the Amarasi language

The Amarasi were a powerful princedom in the west section of Timor during the initial occupation of the Portuguese beginning in the 16th century. According to legend, a young man named Nafi Rasi, accidentally broke a family heirloom and left his home in East Timor to the west, out of fear of retaliation. He acquired guns from the Portuguese-Timoric Topasses, and used them to gain power and prestige, collecting a following from his home province of Belu, and forming a lasting dynasty. By the mid 17th century, the Amarasi had been mostly converted to Catholicism by Dominican missionaries, an influence that has lasted to present day. A 2010 census found that 96.9% of the population in Timor is Catholic, and that 2.2% are Protestant. Because of their debt to the Portuguese for helping found their dynasty, Amarasi sided with them to help resist the Dutch East India Company's settlement in 1640. For over a hundred years the Amarasi fought against the Dutch in the Kupang area along the west coast of Timor, engaging in "low-scale warfare" and headhunting.

The Amarasi suffered a severe loss at the hands of the Dutch in 1752, after attempting a large-scale resistance with the Topasses against the Dutch occupying the west coast in 1749. The Topasses were completely defeated, and the Amarasi attempted to retreat to their Portuguese allies, but were cut off by the Dutch East India Company's forces. Facing defeat, the Amarasi King killed himself rather than be taken prisoner, and a majority of his people were killed or taken as slaves. After several years, the Amarasi were released from their bondage and allowed to return to their native homes, with the condition that they relinquish any affiliation with the Portuguese, and remain loyal to Dutch interests, which they did until West Timor joined the Republic of Indonesia in the 1940s. During this time, the Amarasi dynasty split into three parts, Buwarein, who remained loyal to the bloodline of Nafi Rasi, andTaiba and Houmen, who believed that the bloodline was what had led them to their defeat at the hands of the Dutch. In the early part of the 20th century infighting let to further subdividing of the Amarasi, resulting in a total of five much smaller factions.

These factions were lost during the Japanese occupation of Indonesia between 1942 and 1945, when the Amarasi were united once again. The princedom returned to power for the first few years of the Republic on Indonesia, until in 1962, when "traditional forms of government" were abolished in their region.

Because of its complex occupational history, Amarasi and other Timoric languages use many loan words from Dutch, Portuguese, Japanese, and various other Oceanic languages. Their long alliance with the Portuguese also accounts for why they seem to have had the largest influence on the Amarasi language. For example, the Amarasi for 'thank you' is obrigadu, derived from the Portuguese obrigado.

== Orthography ==
Written Amarasi uses Latin script, with letters that are identical to Indonesian in terms of pronunciation, with the addition of the glottal stop /ʔ/ written as an apostrophe ⟨'⟩.

Amarasi Alphabet	IPA
a	[a]
b	[b]
e	[ɛ]
f	[f]
g	[g]
h	[h]
i	[i]
j	[d͡ʒ]
k	[k]
m	[m]
n	[n]
o	[ɔ]
p	[p]
r	[ɾ]/[r]
s	[s]
t	[t]
u	[u]
'	[ʔ]

c, d, l, q, v, w, x, y and z are only used in loanwords and foreign names.

== Phonology ==
Amarasi contains 13 consonants and 5 vowels.

=== Consonant phonemes ===
	Labial	Apical	Palatal	Velar	Glottal
Plosive	p b	t	(d͡ʒ)	k (g)	ʔ
Fricative	f	s			h
Nasal	m	n			
Rhotic		r			

=== Vowel phonemes ===
i				
			u	
	ɛ			
				ɔ
		a		

==== Phonetic variance ====
Words that begin with a vowel are spoken with a glottal stop before the initial vowel sound.

Phoneme	Allophone	Gloss
/akan/	[ʔakan]	grumbles
/ain/	[ʔain]	before
/ɔɔn/	[ʔɔːn]	harvests
/ɔʔɛn/	[ʔɔʔɛn]	calls
/ɛuk/	[ʔɛʊk]	eats (hard food)

This initial glottal stop is lost when prefixes are attached to vowel-initial roots, for example the third-person prefix /n-/:

Phoneme	Allophone
/n-/ + /akan/	[nakan]
/n-/ + /ain/	[nain]
/n-/ + /ɔɔn/	[nɔːn]
/n-/ + /ɔʔɛn/	[nɔʔɛn]
/n-/ + /ɛuk/	[nɛʊk]

However, the glottal stop is not lost when prefixes are added to words that actually begin with a glottal stop. In that case, the glottal stop is spoken in its place, between the prefix and the rest of the word.

Phoneme	Allophone	Gloss
/n-/ + /ʔatɔr/	[nʔatɔr]	arranges
/n-/ + /ʔain/	[nʔain]	heads towards
/n-/ + /ʔɔban/	[nʔɔbɐn]	digs (with snout)
/n-/ + /ʔɔnɛn/	[nʔɔnɛn]	prays
/n-/ + /ʔɛɛr/	[nʔɛːr]	looks intently

Amarasi vowels vary in pronunciation frequently. Despite being mid vowels, /ɛ/ and /ɔ/ are realized as higher phonemes ([e] and [o] respectively), when followed by higher vowels, or when preceding certain consonants, such as /s/ and /k/ (for /ɛ/) or any labial consonant (for /ɔ/). The high vowel /a/ is often pronounced as [ɪ] or even [e] in informal speech.

Because there are few minimal pairs in Amarasi, plosive consonants are interchangeable with fricative consonants, so long as both consonants are voiced. For example, the Amarasi word for 'round' (/kbubuʔ/) can be pronounced either [kβʊβʊʔ] or [kbʊβʊʔ] without confusion.

- This phonetic variance differs drastically based on dialect, and personal preference.

Similarly, /r/ can be freely pronounced [r] or [ɾ].

== Phonotactics ==
The following phonotactics rules indicate the typical form of Amarasi words, however, due to the presence of many village dialects and an abundance of loan words, at least one notable exception exists for almost every case.

- Any consonant can appear at the beginning, end, or in the middle of a word, with the exception of /d͡ʒ/ and /ɡ/ which appear only in the middle of words, and are mostly seen in loan words.
- Amarasi is characterized by unusual, sometimes unique, consonant clusters. Consonant clusters contain no more than two consonants, which cannot be the same if the cluster is beginning a word. Consonants may appear in any order in a cluster, with the exception of /ʔ/, which must occupy the first position; and /h/ and /r/ which must not occupy the first position.

All Consonant Clusters in Amarasi
C1↓ C2→	p	b	m	f	t	n	r	s	k	ʔ	h
p						pn	pr	ps			
b					bt	bn	br	bs	bk		bh
m				mf	mt	mn	mr	ms			
f						fn	fr				
t	tp			tf		tn	tr		tk		th
n								ns			
r											
s	sp	sb	sm	sf	st	sn	sr		sk		
k	kp	kb	km	kf	kt	kn	kr				kh
ʔ	ʔp	ʔb	ʔm	ʔf	ʔt	ʔn	ʔr	ʔs	ʔk		
h											

- Because there are several single-consonant prefixes (the most common being /ʔ-/, /t-/, /m-/, and /n-/) and the restriction against a three-consonant cluster beginning a word, the vowel /a/ is often used as a "buffer" between the prefix and the word-initial consonant cluster. Single-consonant prefixes attach to words beginning with a single consonant with no additional morphological rules.

Almost all vowels in Amarasi can be found in pairs in either order, except in the case of a high vowel followed by a mid vowel. Sequences of more than two vowels do not occur in Amarasi.

V1↓ V2→	i	ɛ	a	ɔ	u
i	ii		ia		iu
ɛ	ɛi	ɛɛ	ɛa	ɛɔ	ɛu
a	ai	aɛ	aa	aɔ	au
ɔ	ɔi	ɔɛ	ɔa	ɔɔ	ɔu
u	ui		ua		uu

Diphthongs have not been conclusively studied in Amarasi and with one exception, any phonemic variation caused by a diphthong seems to be accidental in speech. The exception to this is a diphthong consisting of the allophone /a/ followed by a high vowel (most commonly /au/ and /ai/) which is consistently realized as a schwa /ə/.

== Basic vocabulary ==
Amarasi is a variant on Uab Meto, the language spoken by the geographically and socially adjacent Atoni people, and share many basic vocabulary words. The main difference between the two languages is that Amarasi lacks the complex grammar and spatial symbolism that Uab Meto is defined by. Another significant difference is that most of the languages in the Uab Meto language chain contain the phoneme /l/, but Amarasi is unique in that all instances of /l/ are replaced with the phoneme /r/.

Basic Amarasi vocabulary
Amarasi	English
Pah (polite), Tua (polite), Hao (normal), He’ (informal), Ya (normal)	Yes
Kaha’, Kahfa’	No
Obrigadu	Thank you
Nek seun banit (Helong dialects)	Thank you
Obrigadu namfau’	Thank you very much
Terimakasih ‘nanaek (Helong dialects)	Thank you very much
Nareok	You are welcome (formal)
Reko	You are welcome (informal)
Sama-sama	You are welcome ('Don't mention it')
Neu’	Please
Maaf, permisi, parmis	Excuse me
Seramat tinggar (said to subject staying)	Good bye
Seramat Jaran (said to subject leaving)	Good bye

Numbers
Amarasi	English
Nor	Zero
Mese'	One
Nua	Two
Teun	Three
Haa	Four
Niim	Five
Nee	Six
Hiut	Seven
Faun, Faon	Eight
Sio	Nine
Bo'	Ten
Bo'es-am-mese'	Eleven
Bo'es-am-nua	Twelve
Bo'es-am-teun	Thirteen
Bo'es-am-haa	Fourteen
Bo'es-am-niim	Fifteen
Bo'es-am-nee	Sixteen
Bo'es-am-hiut	Seventeen
Bo'es-am-faun	Eighteen
Bo'es-am-sio	Nineteen
Bo'nua	Twenty
Bo'nua-m-mese'	Twenty-one
Bo'teun	Thirty
Bo'haa	Forty
Bo'niim	Fifty
Bo'nee	Sixty
Bo'hiut	Seventy
Bo'faun	Eighty
Bo'sio	Ninety
Natun mese'	One hundred
Nifun mese'	One thousand
Juta mese'	One million

== Counting systems ==
Numerals follow the noun when describing quantity:

Amarasi	Gloss
puin es	one ear of corn
tua-f nua	two people
usi-f niim	five kings
neno nee	six days
'poni hiut	seven baskets

Because of the significance of corn to Amarasi culture and livelihood, several different counting systems were developed specifically for counting corn. The three systems use the same words for the bundling and storage processes, but use different base systems for counting. Soi' tain nima is the standard method and uses base 10, soi' tain ne'e is the "lazy system" and uses base 8, and tu'us bo'es am nua is the "modest system" and uses base 12. Because the systems are in different bases, the largest unit of corn while it is in storage, rean es, has a different value in each system. For example, the standard rean es has 400 ears of corn in it, but the "lazy" rean es has only 384, while the "modest" rean es has 480 ears. The following chart shows the amount of corn in each level of storage across the three systems.

	Puin Es (Single Ear)	Tu'us Es (Tied Bundle)	Tanin Es ("Two Bundles")	Suku Es ("Ten Bundles")	Rean Es
Soi' Tain Nima (Standard)	1 ear (5 per tie)	10 ears (2 'Ties')	20 ears (2 Tu'us)	100 ears (5 Tanin)	400 ears (4 Suku)
Soi' Tain Ne'e ("Lazy")	1 ear (4 per tie)	8 ears (2 'Ties')	24 ears (3 Tu'us)	96 ears (4 Tanin)	384 ears (4 Suku)
Tu'us Bo'es Am Nua ("Modest")	1 ear (6 per tie)	12 ears (2 'Ties')	24 ears (2 Tu'us)	120 ears (5 Tanin)	480 ears (4 Suku)

These counting systems serve multiple purposes. The "lazy system" is not only used to hide laziness, but also to avoid being pitied for having a bad crop. The "modest system" is used not only for modesty, but also for protection, if one thinks that one might be robbed. With these systems, three different farmers could claim to have one rean without the others knowing exactly how many he means. This system would cause a problem if the corn needed to be sold, but Amarasi do not sell the corn they grow. Instead, they preserve it, store it in the ceiling, and the mother of the household rations it out throughout the year, as she is the only one who is allowed to retrieve the corn once it has been stored.

== Grammar ==
Amarasi shares a trait with many other Austronesian languages in the form of prepositional verbs, or verb-like prepositions. The Amarasi verb natuin 'to follow' can imply a direction or location ('follow along the coast'), a person ('follow me'), causation ('because of this, it follows that...'), and can even take the form of a conjunction ('because'/''cuz').

== Amarasi Bible ==
In 2007, The Seed Company and the Australian branch of Wycliffe Bible Translators International published a complete Amarasi-language New Testament Bible. Since 99.1% of the Amarasi people are either Catholic or Protestant (the next most common religion among the Amarasi is Islam, which .3% of the population practices), there was a great need and desire for the Bible to be available in their native language. Work on the Amarasi bible began in 2005, when Amarasi was officially declared its own language instead of a dialect of Uab Meto. The Amarasi Bible was translated to the Amarasi language directly from Greek, rather than from the Indonesian Bible, as is the custom of most modern Bible translation agencies. The Amarasi Bible also "follows the principles of meaning-based translation, rather than form-based translation," which aids in understanding and avoids misinterpretation that could occur if the Bible had been literally translated word-for-word. This style of translation preserves the original meaning of the Greek, while making it significantly easier for everyday Amarasi people to understand.
