= Helong language =

Language spoken in West Timor

Helong
- Native to: Indonesia
- Region: West Timor
- Ethnicity: Helong
- Native speakers: (14,000 cited 1997)
- Language family: Austronesian: Malayo-Polynesian; Central–Eastern; Timoric; West Timor; Helong

Language codes
- ISO 639-3: heg
- Glottolog: helo1243
- ELP: Helong
- Helong is classified as Severely Endangered by the UNESCO Atlas of the World's Languages in Danger.

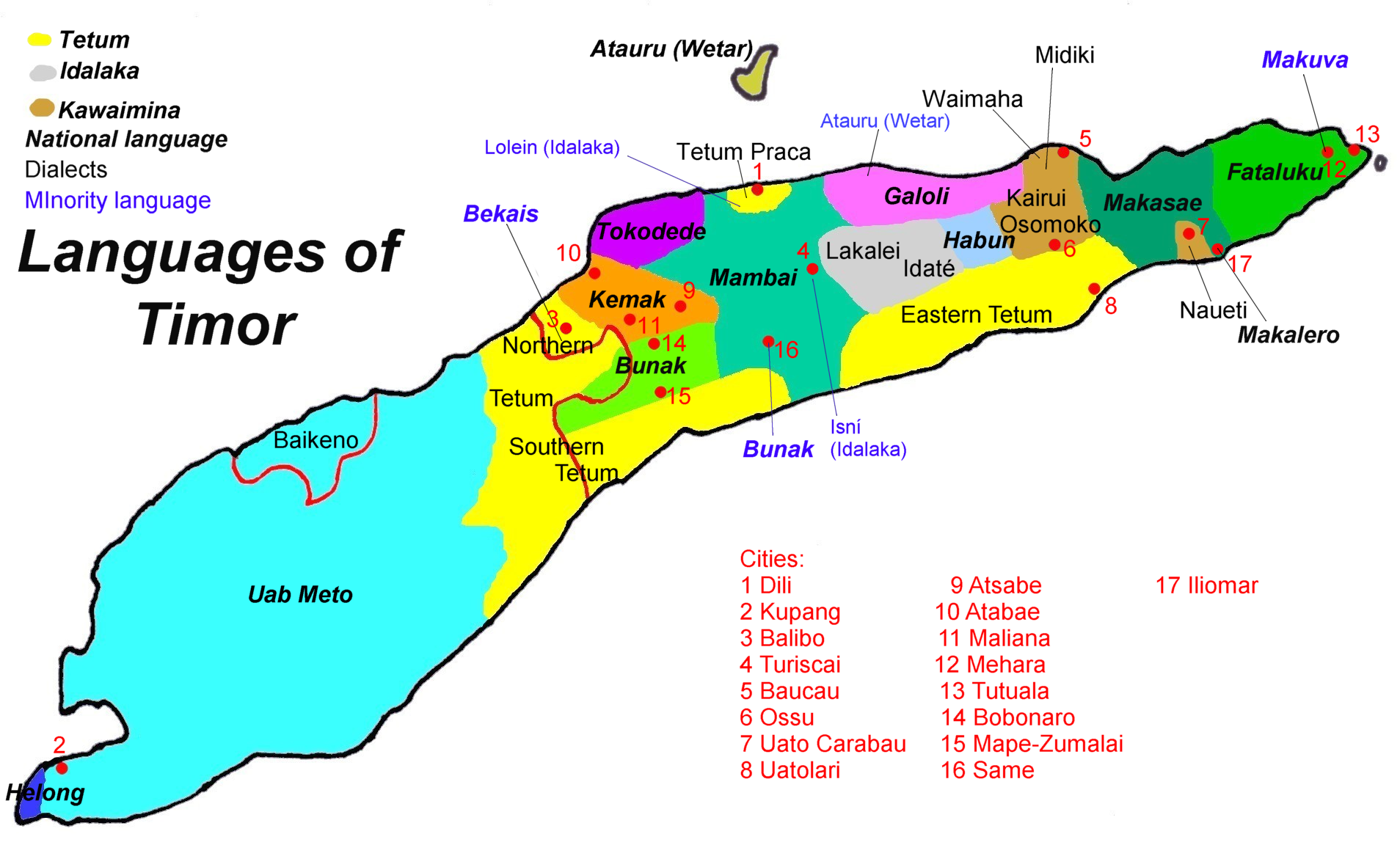
Location of the Helong Language in blue (Western Tip)

Helong (alternate names Helon, Kupang and Semau) is a Central Malayo-Polynesian language of West Timor. Speakers are interspersed with those of Amarasi. This language has become endangered as a result of its native speakers marrying those who do not speak Helong, and as a result of coming in contact with the outside community. Helong speakers are found in four villages on the South-Western coast of West Timor, as well as on Semau Island, a small island just off the coast of West Timor. The mostly Christian, slightly patriarchal society of Semau do their best to send their children away to Bali (or elsewhere) to earn money to send home.

== Classification ==
Helong is an Austronesian language and belongs to its Malayo-Polynesian branch. The Endangered Languages Project has classified Helong as "vulnerable", based on the most recent data from 1997. The largest threat to Helong is a dialect of Malay spoken in Kupang, called Kupang Malay, as the native Helong speakers often visit Kupang, and use that dialect when there.

== History ==
Helong was once the primary language spoken in Kupang, but the language has since fallen out of popularity, and is now used sparsely around Kupang, but mostly used on Semau Island just off the coast of Kupang. In recent years, the people in Kupang have spoken a local dialect of Malay, resulting in Helong being largely forgotten by those who visit the capital city often. While the new language has left behind a lot of the region's history, experts believe that Helong speakers contain a vast wealth of knowledge around the past, specifically, the spreading of Atoni culture when the Dutch gave them weapons, which wiped out many of the other cultures that existed in West Timor, but leaving Helong traditions and culture widely intact.

== Grammar ==
=== Morphology ===
Helong word structure follows a standard C(C)V(C)V(C) (where (C) indicates that a consonant can appear here but does not have to) word structure. Additionally, there is always a consonant at the beginning of every non-clitic word. Ignoring suffixes, the last consonant in any word can only be a few things, the glottal or apical consonants found in the table in the Phonology section, with the exception of the letter d, which does not satisfy this rule. On the contrary, there are no such limits on the last vowel of a word, which can be any of the five.

=== Syntax ===
Helong follows a VSO word order like the other languages closely related to it. Helong is similar to languages like Spanish when it comes to noun-adjective order. The noun will come before the adjective describing it in a sentence. For example, ana hmunan directly translates as 'child first', but refers to somebody's first child. However, unlike in Spanish, punctuation will only come at the end of a sentence. Like most languages, the first word of each sentence, as well as proper nouns are capitalized. Helong uses negative modifiers to change the meaning of a sentence to the opposite. For example, "... parsai lo" means 'do not believe', with parsai meaning 'believe', and lo being a negative modifier.

== Writing system ==
Helong uses the same Latin script used in the majority of languages around the world. While Helong does not use the full 26-character ISO basic Latin alphabet, but contains 27 characters total, which can be seen in the Phonology section below. While most of Helong words are written in the same format as English words, one key difference is that when using modifiers such as plurals, distributive numerals, and frequencies, Helong uses Hyphens or Tildes to connect the base word to the modifier.

For example, in the sentence "Tode-s dua~dua le halin nahi-s deken", tode means lay, so tode-s would refer to laying multiple things, as the -s indicates plurality. Dua is the number 'two', so dua~dua would translate to the English 'pair'.

== Phonology ==
Helong has five vowels: /a, e, i, o, u/.

Consonants
		Labial	Alveolar	Velar	Glottal
Nasal		m	n	ŋ	
Stop	voiceless	p	t	k	ʔ
Stop	voiced	b	d	g	
Fricative		f	s		h
Approximant		w	l		
Trill			r		

The palatal stops /c, ɟ/ and the voiced labio-velar approximant /w/ are marginal phonemes, only occurring in a few loanwords.

== Numbers ==
Numbers 1–30
1	mesa	11	hngul esa	21	buk dua beas esa or buk dua-s esa
2	dua	12	hngul dua	22	buk dua beas dua or buk dua-s dua
3	tilu	13	hngul tilu	23	buk dua beas tilu or buk dua-s tilu
4	aat	14	hngul aat	24	buk dua beas aat or buk dua-s aat
5	lima	15	hngul lima	25	buk dua beas lima or buk dua-s lima
6	eneng	16	hngul eneng	26	buk dua beas eneng or buk dua-s eneng
7	itu	17	hngul itu	27	buk dua beas itu or buk dua-s itu
8	palu	18	hngul palu	28	buk dua beas palu or buk dua-s palu
9	sipa	19	hngul sipa	29	buk dua beas sipa or buk dua-s sipa
10	hngulu	20	buk dua	30	buk tilu

The Helong language uses words for each base unit (i.e. tens, hundreds, thousands). For example, the number 27 could be said as "tens two ones seven", indicating a 2 in the tens column and a 7 in the ones column.

Base Units
ones	beas
tens	buk
hundreds	ngatus
thousands	lihu
millions	juta

Ordinal numbers, with the exception of the word for first, simply add ke in front of the word for the number. Researchers have been unable to determine if ke is its own word, a prefix, or a proclitic.

Ordinals
First	hmunan	Sixth	ke eneng
Second	ke dua	Seventh	ke itu
Third	ke tilu	Eighth	ke palu
Fourth	ke aat	Ninth	ke sipa
Fifth	ke lima	Tenth	ke hngulu

=== Non-numeric quantity ===
Non-Numeric Quantity
many	mamo, mamamo
all	toang, totang
many (crowded)	hut, hutu
plenty (many lots)	mamo kose
plenty (many big)	mamo tene
too much (many excessive)	mamo naseke
entire (complete)	nuli
way too many	ketang kaa to
none, nothing	ase
alone, by yourself	sii
each	mesa-mesa

ketang kaa to is a Helong idiom that translates directly as 'cockatoos eating seeds', which they use as a saying to describe way too many of a specific item.

== Examples ==
The following are example sentences of Helong:

Helong	Literal Translation	Actual Translation
Ni un ana ke lima la nia	This child fifth hers	This is her fifth child
Atuil at hngul dua na-s maa daek hulung	people ten two come work help	Those twelve people came to help
Laok nui kit hmake salat dua	go pick (person and self) tamarind cluster two	Let's go pick two bunches of tamarind
Bingin tilu halas-sam oen pait maa-s	day three just then 3 people return come-plural	In three days then they will come back
Kaim daad lelo ila lo se la-ng	we stay day several at distant place (general)	We stayed there for several days.
Oen tilu-s lii naseke	people 3-plural frighten too much	The three of them were very scared.
Minggua mesa-m oe dua	week one (pause) time two	Two times in one week.
Lahin oen maa-s se ia-s	yesterday people come-plural at close place	Yesterday they came here
