= List of colonial Residents of Dutch Timor =

This is a list of colonial Residents of Dutch Timor from the mid-seventeenth century to decolonization in 1949. Colonial rivalry on Timor between the Dutch East India Company (VOC) and the Portuguese began in 1613, conditioned by the desire to control the sandalwood trade in the region. The Dutch were permanently established on the island Solor, to the north of Timor, from 1646. In 1653 they founded a fortress in Kupang in West Timor, Fort Concordia, and made it their main regional base in 1657. The fortress was headed by a colonial Resident who, during the VOC era, carried the name opperhoofd. The territory controlled by the VOC on Timor was originally restricted to the vicinity of Kupang, the so-called sespalen gebied. After 1749 large parts of West Timor fell under Dutch suzerainty, and a major contract was made by the diplomat Johannes Andreas Paravicini with the various rulers in 1756 to bind them to the VOC sphere. However, attempts to subjugate areas in East Timor were thwarted by 1761. The VOC was dissolved in 1799 and replaced by a new colonial organization under the Batavian Republic. Fort Concordia capitulated to the British in January 1812 and stood under British rule until 1816 when it was returned to the new Kingdom of the Netherlands. Agreements with the Portuguese in 1851 and 1859 established the borders between Dutch and Portuguese Timor. In the late colonial period the Residency of Timor and Dependencies (Timor en Onderhoorigheden) consisted of West Timor, Roti, Savu, Sumbawa, Flores, the Solor Islands, and the Alor Islands. The Dutch administration was ousted through the Japanese attack in 1942. The Dutch, assisted by a force from Australia returned in the fall of 1945. During the Indonesian Revolution in 1945-49 there was widespread republican and anti-colonial agitation, but no physical fighting. The last Dutch Resident A. Verhoef handed over his powers to a new Indonesian administration in late 1949.

== List of Residents ==
- Hendrick Hendricksz van Oldenburgh (on Solor), 1646-1648
- Hendrick ter Horst (on Solor), 1648–1654
- Jacob Verheyden (on Solor), 1654-1655
- Cornelis Ockersz (on Solor, acting), 1655
- Hendrick ter Horst (on Solor until 1657), 1655-1659
- Joseph Margits, 1659-1660
- Johan Truytman (commissioner), 1660
- Hugo Cuylenburgh, 1660-1665
- Anthony Hurt, 1665-1667
- Jacob Pietersz van den Kerper, 1667-1670
- Jacob Lidema (acting), 1670-1672
- Jacob van Wijckersloot, 1672-1680
- Joannes van den Broeck, 1681-1683
- Willem Tange (acting) 1683-1684
- Jan van Heden 1684-1684
- Willem Tange, 1684-1685
- Gerrit Hoofd, 1685-1686
- Willem Moerman, 1686-1687
- Arend Verhoeven 1687
- Willem Moerman, 1687-1698
- François van den Eynde, 1698
- Willem Moerman, 1698-1699
- Joan Focanus, 1699-1702
- Joannes van Alphen, 1702-1706
- Didloff Blad, 1706-1712
- Reynier Leers, 1712-1714
- Isaac Marmer, 1714
- Leendert Grim (acting), 1714-1715
- Willem van Putten, 1715-1717
- Barend van der Swaan, 1717-1721
- Hendrick Engelert, 1721-1725
- Balthazar de Moucheron, 1725-1728
- Steven Palm (acting), 1728-1729
- Anthony Hurt, 1729-1730
- Gerardus Bernardus Visscher, 1730-1736
- Aart Jansz Peper, 1736-1739
- Pieter Jacob Blok, 1739
- Aart Jansz Peper, 1739-1740
- Jan Dinnies, 1740-1740
- Christiaan Fredrik Brandenburg (acting), 1740-1741
- Anthony Cornelis van Oldenbarnevelt (Tulling), 1741-1742
- Christiaan Fredrik Brandenburg (acting), 1742-1744
- Jan Anthony Meulenbeek, 1744-1746
- Gilles Jacob Helmmuts (acting), 1746-1747
- Johannes Steenwegh (acting), 1747-1747/48
- Daniel van der Burgh, 1748-1754
- Elias Jacob Beynon, 1754-1758
- Johannes Andreas Paravicini (commissioner), 1756
- Hans Albrecht von Plüskow, 1758-1761
- Johan Willem Erland Daniel ter Herbruggen, 1762-1765
- Bartholomeus van Voorst, 1765-1766
- Willem Adriaan van Este (acting), 1766-1767
- Alexander Cornabé, 1767-1772
- Barend Willem Fokkens, 1772-1777
- Willem Adriaan van Este, 1777-1789
- Timotheus Wanjon, 1789-1797
- Carel Gratus Greving, 1797-1799
- George Simon Gotthelft Doser (commissioner), 1799-1800
- Hans Andries Lofsteth (commissioner), 1800-1802
- Johannes Giesler, 1802-1803
- Frans Philip Christiaan Kurtzen (acting), 1803-1804
- Pieter Bernardus van Kruijne, 1804-1807
- Frans Philip Christiaan Kurtzen (acting), 1807
- Pieter Stopkerb, 1807-1810
- Jacobus Arnoldus Hazaart, 1810-1812
- Cornelis Willem Knibbe (under British rule), 1812
- Watson (under British rule), 1812
- Joseph Burn (under British rule), 1812-1814
- Curtois (under British rule, acting), 1814
- Jacobus Arnoldus Hazaart (under British rule until 1816), 1814–18
- M. Haleweijn (acting), 1818-1819
- Jacobus Arnoldus Hazaart, 1819-1832
- Emanuel A. Francis (commissioner) 1831-32
- Johan Baptist Spanoghe, 1833-1835
- Carel Frederik Goldman, 1835-1836
- Diderik Johan van den Dungen Gronovius, 1836-1841
- Cornelis Sluyter, 1841-1844
- Siegfried George Friedrich Fraenkel, 1844-1845
- Cornelis Sluyter, 1845-1848
- Dirk Wouter Jacob Carel, Baron van Lynden, 1849-1852
- Frederik Marie Gerard van Cattenburch (acting), 1852
- Jhr. Theodoor van Capellen, 1852-1856
- Siegfried George Friedrich Fraenkel, 1856-1858
- Johannes Grudelbach, 1858-1859
- Willem Leendert Hendrik Brocx, 1859-1861
- Isaac Esser (acting), 1861-1863
- Roelof Wijnen, 1863-1864
- Jan George Coorengel, 1864-1869
- Johan Arnoud Caspersz, 1869-1872
- Jan Karel de Wit, 1872-1873
- Hendrik Carel Humme, 1873-1875
- Charles Matthieu George Arinus Marinus Ecoma Verstege, 1875-1878
- Johann Gerard Friedrich Riedel, 1878-1880
- Willem Fredrik Sikman, 1880-1881
- Salomon Roos, 1882-1884
- Wouter Greve, 1884-1888
- Guillaume Gérard de Villeneuve, 1888-1890
- Willem Cornelis Hoogkamer, 1890-1893
- Cornelis Marius Eduard Merens, 1893-1895
- Joachimus Lambertus Julius Alphonsus Ruijssenaers, 1895
- J. van Wijck, 1896-1898
- Fokko Fokkens (acting), 1898-1899
- Johannes Vijzelaar, 1899-1902
- Frits Anton Heckler, 1902-1905
- Johannes Frederikus Antonius de Rooy, 1906-1908
- Eugene François Jean Loriaux, 1908-1911
- Cornelis Hendrik van Rieschoten, 1911-1913
- Ernst Gustav Theodoor Maier, 1913-1917
- K. A. James, 1917-1918
- Anthony Hendrik Spaan, 1918-1921
- August Jules Louis Couvreur, 1921-1924
- C. Schultz 1924-1927
- Paulus Franciscus Josephus Karthaus, 1927-1931
- Eugene Henri de Nijs Bik, 1931-1934
- Johan Jacob Bosch, 1934-1938
- Fokko Jan Nieboer, 1938-1942
- Cornelis Woutherus Schüller, 1945-1948
- A. Verhoef, 1948-1949

== See also ==
- List of colonial governors of Portuguese Timor
- List of rulers of Timor
- History of Timor
- Kupang
