= Kupang Malay =

Malay-based creole language

- Melayu Kupang
- Native to: Indonesia
- Region: West Timor
- Native speakers: L1: 200,000 (2015); L2: 150,000 (2015)
- Language family: Malay-based creole: Eastern Indonesian Malay; Kupang Malay

Language codes
- ISO 639-3: mkn
- Glottolog: kupa1239

Kupang Malay or Kupang language is a Malay-based creole language spoken in Kupang, East Nusa Tenggara, which is on the west end of Timor Island. Kupang Malay is presently used as a lingua franca for inter-ethnic communication, and it also has native speakers.

It is based on archaic Malay mixed mostly with Dutch, Portuguese, and other local languages. It is similar to Ambonese Malay with several differences in vocabulary and accent. Its grammatical system resembles other Eastern Indonesian Malay creoles.

Kupang Malay originated sometime before the 17th century. Kupang Malay has Rotinese influence.

== Phonology ==
Like Indonesian, words in Kupang Malay are usually stressed on the penultimate syllable. Some words are stressed on the final syllable as they would be in their source languages. This results in some contrastive stress.

Examples of minimal pairs
Kupang Malay	gloss
barat	west
barát	heavy
parang	machete
paráng	war

=== Vowels ===
The vowels of Kupang Malay are shown in the chart below.

Monophthong phonemes
	Front	Central	Back
Close	i		u
Mid	e		o
Open		a	

Unlike in Indonesian, there is no schwa in Kupang Malay.

Examples of words without schwa
Indonesian	Kupang Malay	English Gloss
səlamat	salamat	'greetings, safe'
kəliling	kaliling, kuliling	'go around'
səbentar	sabantar	'a moment'
pərut	parú	'stomach'
pədas	pedis	'spicy'

The "ia ,"ie, "io", and iu, reduces to iya, iye, iyo, iyu or nua, oa, os becomes nuwa, woa, wos.

=== Consonants ===
The consonants of Kupang Malay are shown in the chart below.

Consonant phonemes
		Labial	Alveolar	Palatal	Velar	Glottal
Nasal		m	n	ɲ	ŋ	
Plosive	voiceless	p	t	c	k	ʔ
Plosive	voiced	b	d	ɟ	ɡ	
Fricative		f	s			h
Approximant			l	j	w	
Trill			r			

Kupang Malay has intervocalic glottal stops in some words from which originate from other local languages or Arabic.

- The lack of foreign letters e.g. "z","v", and"q"

For example;

- Zaman → Saman
- Video → Fideo
- Qatar → Katar

== Pronouns ==
The pronouns in Kupang Malay differ from Indonesian as shown in the table below.

Pronouns
Pronouns	Indonesian	Kupang Malay
First person singular First person plural (inclusive); First person plural (exclusive)	aku, saya kita kami	beta katong batong
Second person singular Second person plural	kamu, engkau kalian	lu basong
Third person singular Third person plural	dia mereka	dia dong

== Morphology ==
Reduplication is frequent. Reduplication can express several things such as: variety, similarity, repetition, non-urgency, and aimlessness.

== Grammar ==
The word order of Kupang Malay is mixed Malay and the Helong language.

English	Indonesian	Kupang Malay
Kupang city	Kota Kupang	Kupang kota
Indonesia has already become to most populated country.	Indonesia sudah menjadi negara yang teramai	Indonesia su manjadi yang tarame

Possessives are formed by placing a possessive particle, pung after the possessor and before the possessed item.

beta pung ruma
1S POSS house
'my house'
