= Sasando Building =

Residence of East Nusa Tenggara governor

Coordinates: 10.1716°S 123.6075°E

- Gedung Sasando
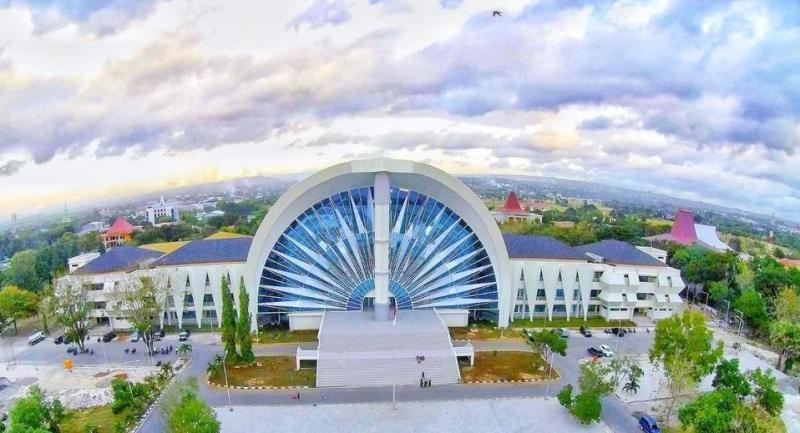
- View of Sasando Building

General information
- Location: Jl. El Tari No. 52, Kota Raja, Kupang 85111 (Indonesia)
- Groundbreaking: 23 October 2015
- Inaugurated: 9 January 2017

Sasando Building (Indonesian: Gedung Sasando) is an office building of East Nusa Tenggara governor. The building is located in city of Kupang, in Kota Raja District.

It is a relatively new building, built in 2015 and inaugurated on 9 January 2017. The building was modeled after traditional music instrument from the province, sasando. It has five floors in the middle section and three floors in both left and right rear section. According to an article in Tempo, the construction cost around Rp 178 billions or around 12 millions USD funded partially by the provincial government. It was constructed after the old governor office building was destroyed by fire in 2013. The construction was initially criticitzed as waste of money and insufficient building permit.

It was damaged on 2018 by strong wind, sparking criticism and questions regarding quality of its building material and alleged corruption. The building was again lightly damaged by Cyclone Seroja in 2021, followed by another wave of criticism that the building was not built to withstand strong wind and poorly designed.

The building is open to public and frequently used by local artists for performance, as it has a performance stage inside.
