= Kupang =

Capital and largest city of East Nusa Tenggara, Indonesia

- City
- City of Kupang; Kota Kupang
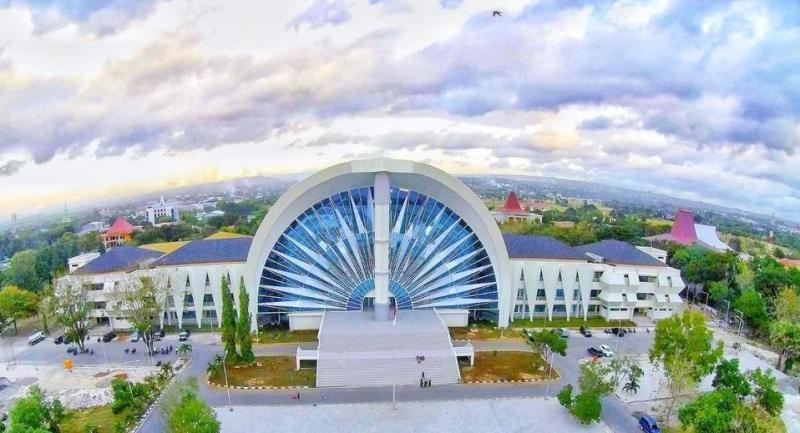
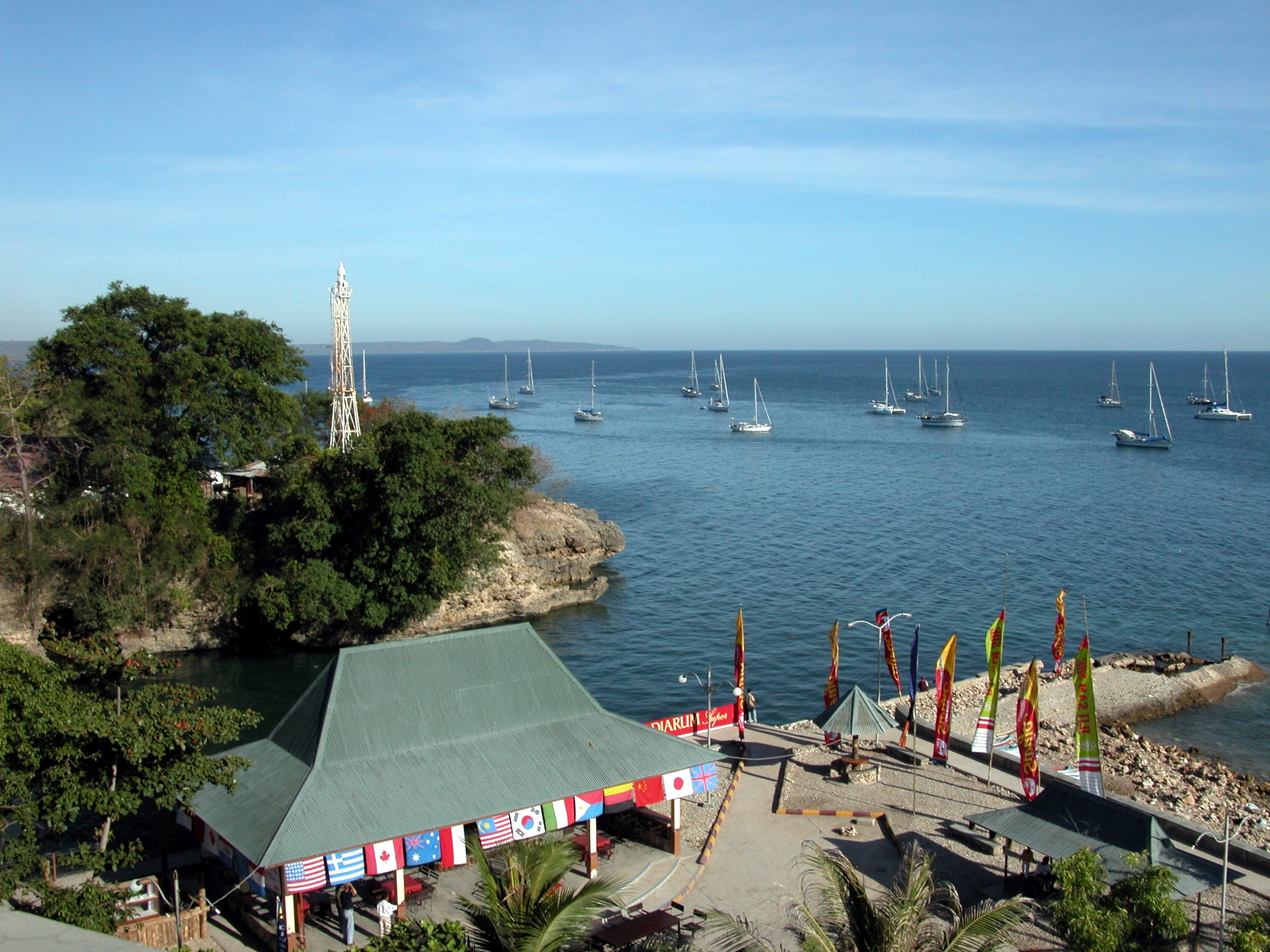
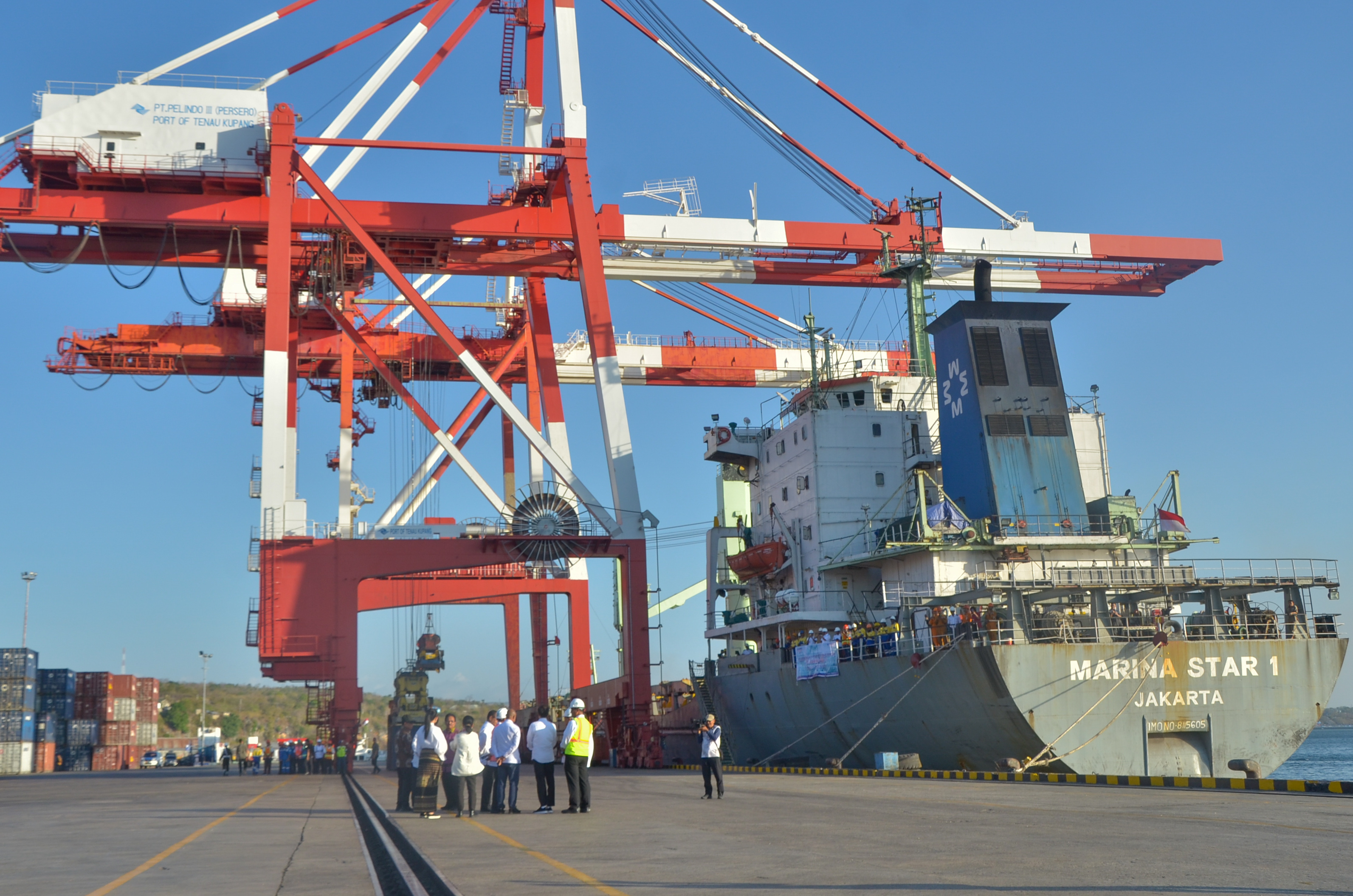
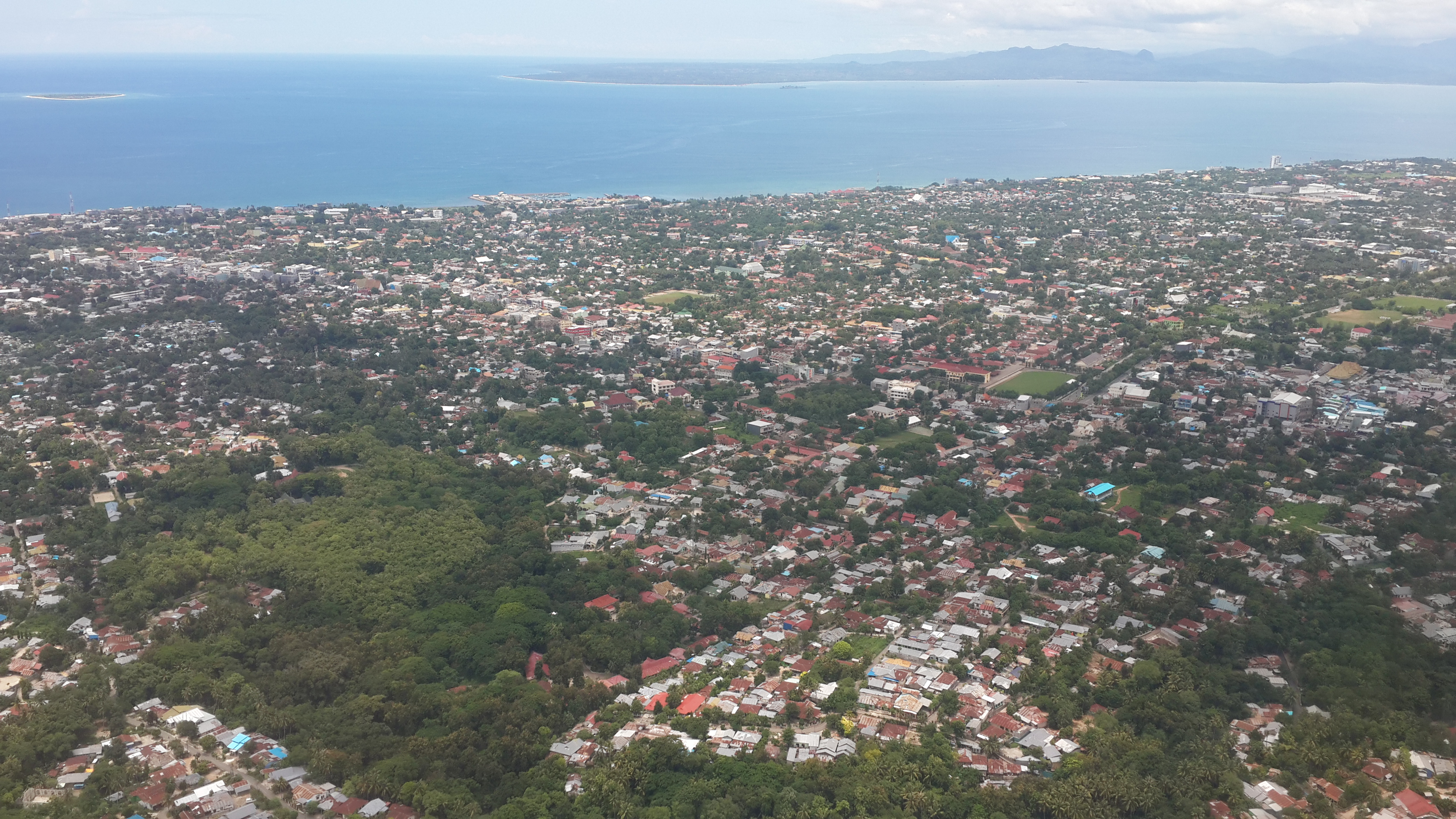
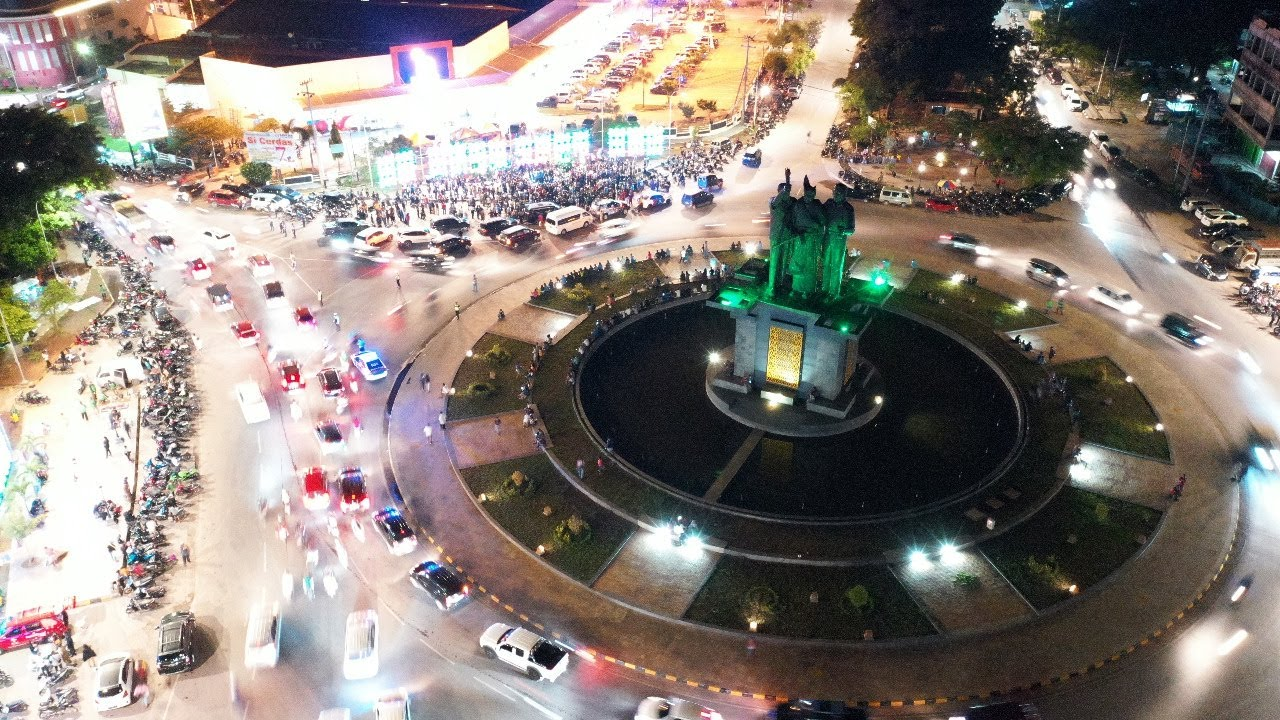
- Clockwise, from above; Sasando Building, Kupang seen from above, and Kupang lighthouse

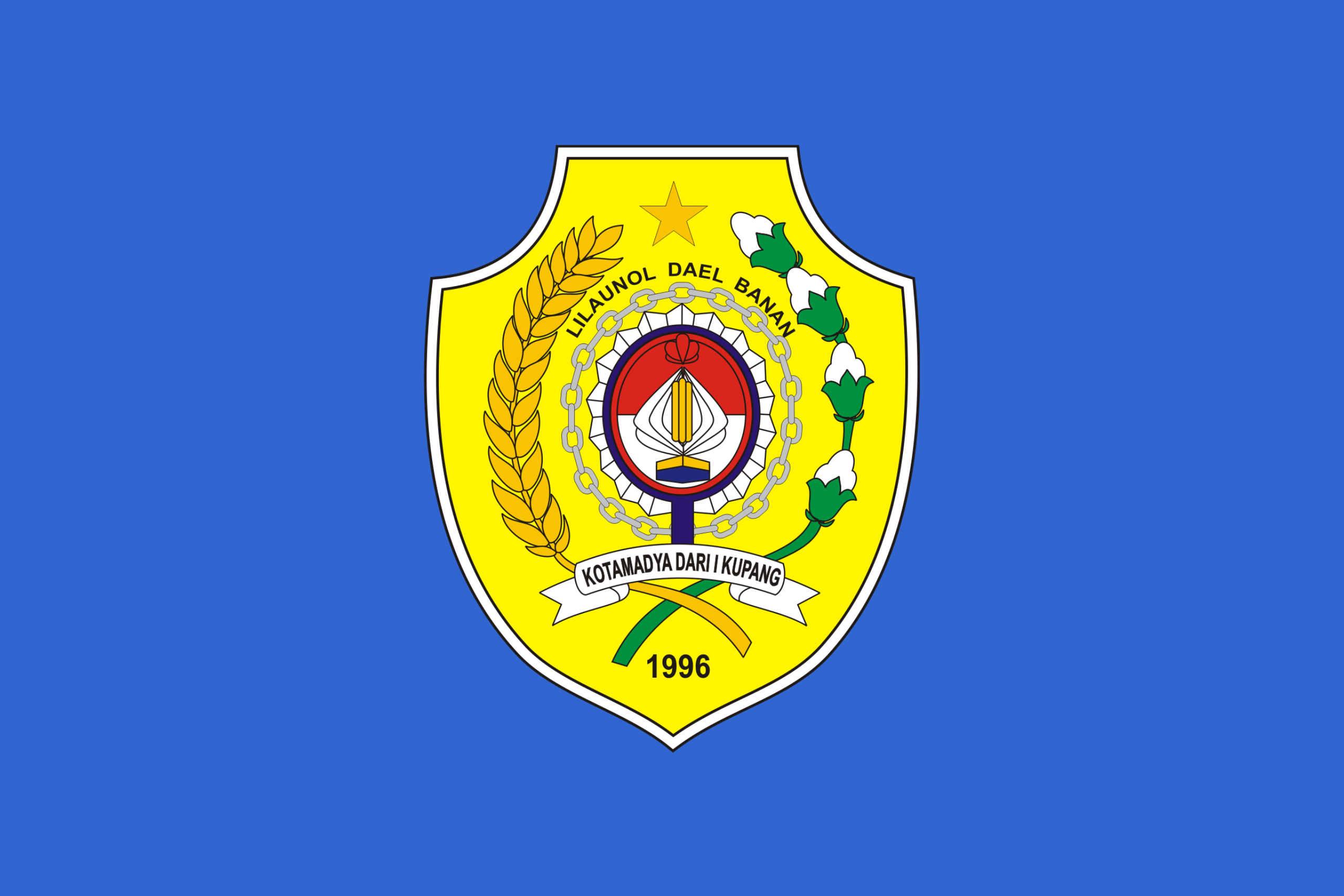
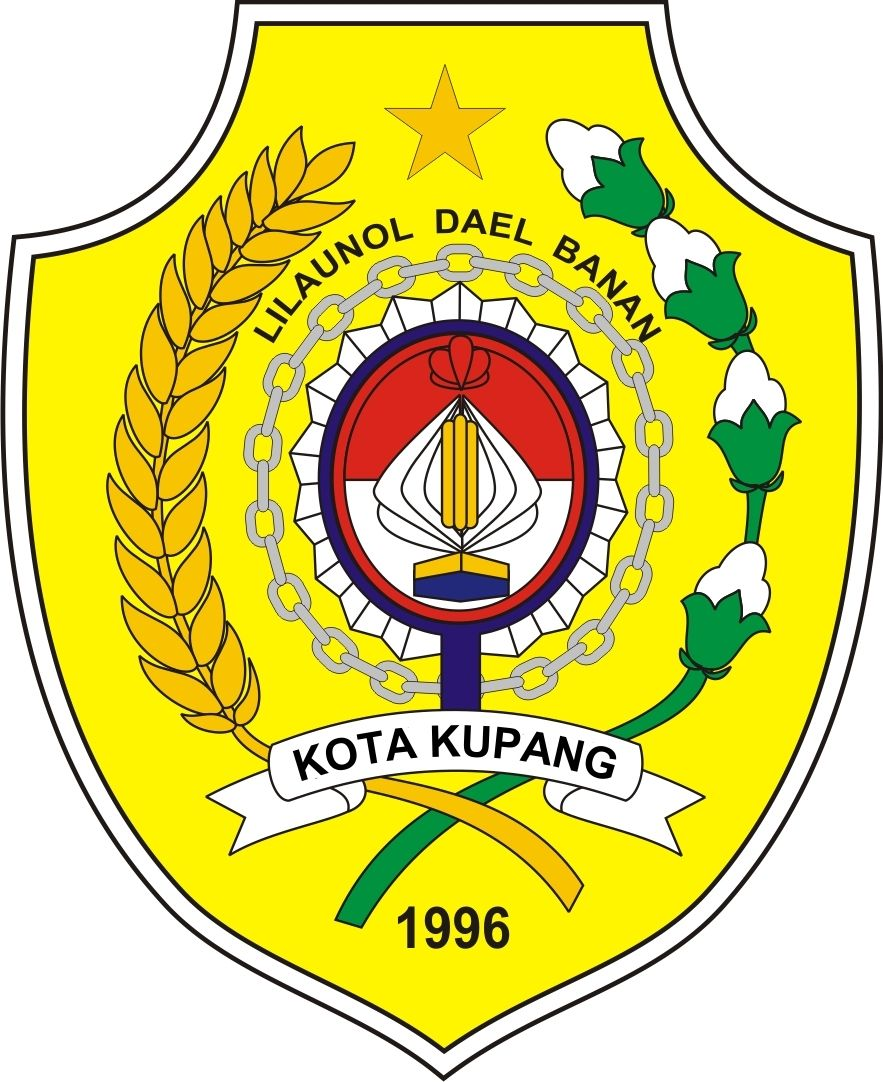
- Flag Coat of arms
- Motto(s): Lil Au Nol Dael Banan (Helong) "Build me with a sincere heart"
- Interactive map of Kupang
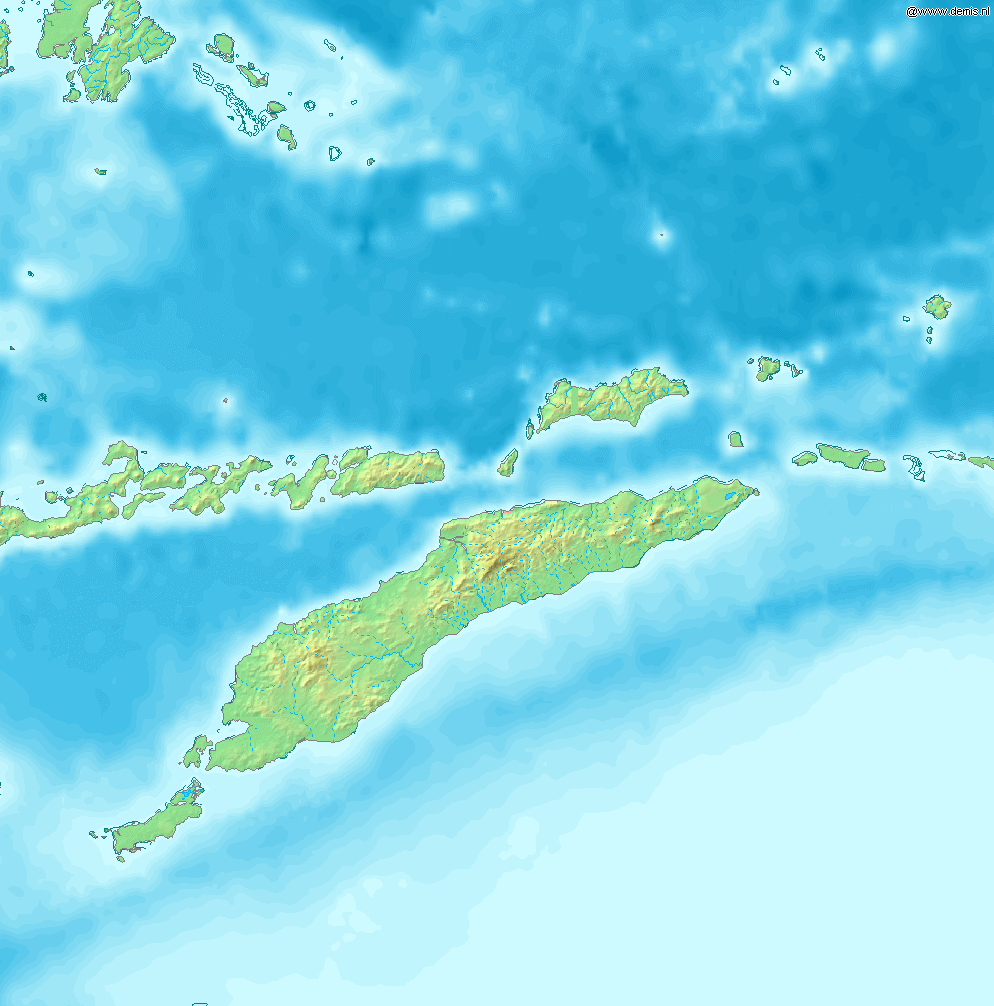
- Location in Timor Location in Lesser Sunda Islands Location in Indonesia
- Coordinates: 10°10′12.6″S 123°36′27.9″E
- Country: Indonesia
- Province: East Nusa Tenggara
- Founded: 1886
- Incorporated: 1 July 1978
- City Status: 11 April 1996

Government
  - Mayor: Christian Widodo (PSI)
  - Vice Mayor: Serena Cosgrova Franscies
  - Legislature: Kupang City Regional House of Representatives (DPRD)

Area
  - Total: 180.27 km^{2} (69.60 sq mi)
- Elevation: 62 m (203 ft)

Population (mid 2025 estimate)
  - Total: 482,734
  - Density: 2,677.8/km^{2} (6,935.6/sq mi)
- Time zone: UTC+8 (Central Indonesia Standard Time)
- Postal code: 85000
- Area code: (+62) 380
- Vehicle registration: DH
- HDI (2022): ▲0.802 (Very high)
- Website: kupangkota.go.id

Kupang (Indonesian: Kota Kupang, Indonesian pronunciation: [ˈkupaŋ]), formerly known in Dutch as Koepang, is the capital of the Indonesian province of East Nusa Tenggara. At the 2020 Census, it had a population of 442,758; the official estimate as of mid 2025 was 482,734 (comprising 242,903 males and 239,831 females). It is the largest city and port (actually the only independent city in the province) on the island of Timor, and is a part of the Timor Leste–Indonesia–Australia Growth Triangle free trade zone. Geographically, Kupang is the southernmost large city in Indonesia, as well as the closest to Australia.

== History ==
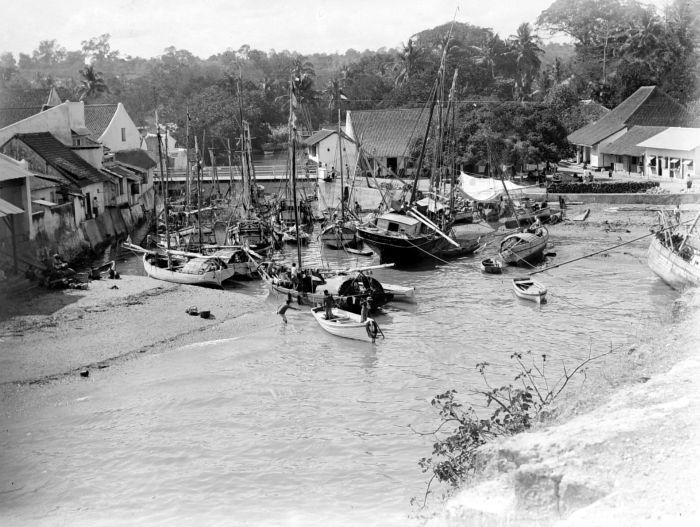
The harbor of Kupang in the early 20th century.

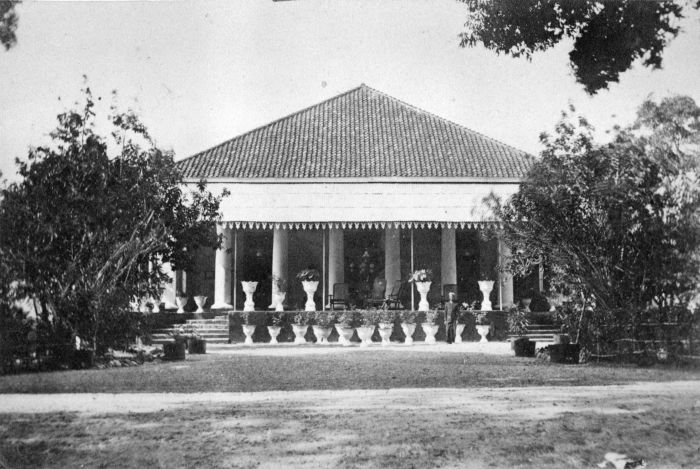
The house of the Resident of Timor in the early 20th century.

=== Early history and Portuguese domination ===
Kupang was an important port and trading post during the Portuguese and Dutch colonial eras. There are still ruins and remnants of the colonial presence in the city.

Representatives of the Dutch East India Company (VOC) first encountered Kupang in 1613 after having conquered the Portuguese fort on the island of Solor. At this time the area of the city was governed by a Raja of the Helong tribe, who claimed descent from the island of Seram in the Maluku archipelago. Kupang occupied an ideal strategic position to exercise control over parts of Timor since it was possible to monitor shipping activities along the south coast of the island from the location. Moreover, the Koinino River provided a supply of fresh water for the city.

An agreement was reached between the VOC and the Helong tribe, but due to a lack of VOC presence in Timor, Kupang was heavily influenced by the Portuguese mestizo population of Flores, the Topasses, which led to the establishment of a Portuguese stronghold by the 1640s. However, by 1646, the VOC was firmly established on the nearby island of Solor and renewed their agreement with the local Raja of Kupang. In January 1653, a Dutch fortification, Fort Concordia, was built on an elevated position on the left bank of the river estuary. Kupang then became the base of the Dutch struggle against the Portuguese. After a series of defeats were inflicted on the Dutch between 1655 and 1657, large groups of refugees from the neighbouring VOC allies of the Sonbai and Amabi principalities settled into the vicinity of Kupang and formed small polities on land that had traditionally belonged to the Helong. They were followed by two other groups, the Amfoang and the Taebenu, who arrived in 1683 and 1688, respectively. The Helong Raja remained the "Lord of the Land" (tuan tanah) but remained closely dependent on VOC authorities. However, apart from the territory of the Helong, the island of Timor was largely dominated by the Portuguese until 1749.

=== Dutch colony ===
The Dutch established a European-modelled administration with a chief executive (opperhoofd) and a council, which regulated affairs with the indigenous population through regular meetings (vergaderingen), and also handled affairs with the nearby VOC-allied islands of Rote, Sabu, and Solor. Chinese traders and artisans were settled by the early 18th century and soon became an indispensable part of the local economy. The area of the town was also settled by various indigenous groups from the region, and by mardijkers (who were the descendants of freed slaves under Dutch jurisdiction). In 1752, the population consisted of 827 Christians and an unspecified number of non-Christians. The political importance of Kupang increased greatly in 1749 when the Topasses were decisively defeated by the Dutch and their allies, which led to the extension of VOC influence over wide areas of western and central Timor. Nevertheless, Dutch influence on the island was somewhat diminished after 1761 due to incompetence and inaction on the part of the colonial administration.

Kupang was the final destination of William Bligh, who was set adrift in an open boat following the Mutiny on the Bounty (1789). After travelling 3,618 nautical miles (6,710 km) from the Tonga Islands over 41 days, Bligh landed in Kupang on 14 June. News of his journey inspired a small party of nine convicts and two children to escape from the penal colony at Sydney Cove, Australia, they escaped from Port Jackson, Australia, and arrived at Kupang after ten weeks, having travelled 3,254 nautical miles (6,026 km) in an open boat.

VOC positions in the East Indies were attacked by British Forces following the occupation of the Netherlands by French revolutionary armies in 1795. Kupang was assaulted in 1797, and the British were eventually expelled, although the town suffered extensive damage. Another British attack in 1811 was similarly defeated. After the British occupation of Java, Kupang finally surrendered in January 1812, and the town was returned to the Dutch in 1816 following the end of the Napoleonic Wars.

The politics of the city in the early 19th century were dominated by Jacobus Arnoldus Hazaart, who governed Dutch Timor as a Resident in three terms between 1810 and 1832 and handled matters with little interference from the colonial government in Batavia. During his tenure, the Christian mission in the city experienced greater success than before, partially through the efforts of the missionary Reint LeBruyn (1799-1829). The town was opened to foreign trade in 1825, and fees were abolished three years later. Kupang's subsequent popularity with British and North American whalers was diminished by the late 19th century after the relocation of whaling areas, although the city was a free port after 1866. In 1917, the five small kingdoms that surrounded the town area (the Helong kingdoms of Kupang, Sonbai Kecil, Amabi, Taebenu, and Funai) were merged into the zelfbesturend landschap (self-ruling territory) of Kupang in 1917, which, despite the name, did not include the city itself. From 1918 to 1955 Kupang was governed by the Nisnoni family, a branch of the Sonbai Dynasty.

=== Recent history and independence ===
The city was used for landing and refueling by long-distance flights between Europe and Australia. It was under Japanese occupation between 1942 and 1945, and much of the Old Town was destroyed by Allied bombing. The city saw significant nationalist agitation but remained otherwise peaceful during the period of the Indonesian revolution (1945-1949). Kupang was later part of the State of East Indonesia and was established by the Dutch authorities in 1946, and the area of the city was included in the zelfbesturend landschap of Kupang. The city, along with the state of East Indonesia was later annexed into the United States of Indonesia in 1949, which was replaced by the current Republic of Indonesia in 1950.

The city later became an important location in the Timorese conflict. In 1967, the city became the seat of the Diocese of Kupang. In 1989, the diocese was elevated to the Archdiocese of Kupang. In April 2021, the city was heavily damaged by Tropical Cyclone Seroja.

== Geography ==
Kupang is located on the southwestern tip of the island of Timor. It is solely bordered by the Kupang Regency on land and on its northern shore by the Savu Sea. It has a land area of 180.27 square kilometers (which is divided into six administrative districts), along with a water area of 94.79 square kilometers. The area around the city is geologically inactive, with soil composition characterised by non-volcanic materials such as Latosol and Terra rossa. At its highest point, the city is 62 metres above sea level, with inclination varying from 0 - 5%. The topography of the city is mostly low-lying but also includes groups of hills in the south and southwest, which has the effect of creating a relatively fertile catchment area.

=== Climate ===
Under the Köppen climate classification, Kupang has a tropical savanna climate (Aw). Unlike many cities with this climate, Kupang's temperature varies little between the summer season (October to March) and the winter season (April to September). The hottest month is October (with an average temperature of 28.8 °C or 83.8 °F), while the coolest is July (with an average temperature of 26.1 °C or 79.0 °F). The city experiences extreme wet and dry seasons, with January being the wettest month (with an average total rainfall of 386 millimetres or 15.20 inches), while August and September are the driest months (with an average of only 2 millimetres or 0.079 inches of rain in each month).

Climate data for Kupang, West Timor, Indonesia (1991–2020 normals)
Month	Jan	Feb	Mar	Apr	May	Jun	Jul	Aug	Sep	Oct	Nov	Dec	Year
Mean daily maximum °C (°F)	30.9 (87.6)	31.0 (87.8)	31.7 (89.1)	32.7 (90.9)	32.5 (90.5)	31.3 (88.3)	31.3 (88.3)	32.2 (90.0)	33.6 (92.5)	34.2 (93.6)	34.1 (93.4)	31.9 (89.4)	32.3 (90.1)
Daily mean °C (°F)	27.0 (80.6)	26.5 (79.7)	26.8 (80.2)	27.3 (81.1)	27.1 (80.8)	26.1 (79.0)	25.9 (78.6)	26.0 (78.8)	26.8 (80.2)	28.3 (82.9)	28.6 (83.5)	27.5 (81.5)	27.0 (80.6)
Mean daily minimum °C (°F)	24.2 (75.6)	23.8 (74.8)	23.5 (74.3)	23.4 (74.1)	23.3 (73.9)	22.6 (72.7)	21.8 (71.2)	21.4 (70.5)	21.5 (70.7)	23.0 (73.4)	24.1 (75.4)	24.5 (76.1)	23.1 (73.6)
Average rainfall mm (inches)	386 (15.2)	347 (13.7)	234 (9.2)	65 (2.6)	30 (1.2)	10 (0.4)	5 (0.2)	2 (0.1)	2 (0.1)	17 (0.7)	83 (3.3)	232 (9.1)	1,413 (55.8)
Average rainy days (≥ 1.0 mm)	18.1	15.5	13.2	5.0	2.5	1.2	0.8	0.3	0.3	1.3	6.9	14.7	79.8
Mean monthly sunshine hours	189	195	223	267	276	276	288	304	306	288	264	205	3,081
Source 1: Deutscher Wetterdienst
Source 2: Danish Meteorological Institute Starlings Roost Weather

== Demographics ==
Because of its status as a provincial capital, Kupang has become a multi-ethnic city and is a popular destination for migration from neighbouring regions. The city's population increased by 31% from 2010 to 2020, and by an estimated further 9% by 2025. In that year, the ratio of males to females in the city was 101.28:100. As with most Indonesian cities, the population is young, with 68.9% of the city's population classified in the potential productive workforce of people aged between 15 and 65 years of age. The predominant age group is in the range of 20 to 24 years old, which can be attributed to an influx of young migrants from other regions. The population growth in 2020 was approximately 3%, which fell to 2.57% per annum on average between 2020 and 2024.

The majority of the city's population identifies as Christians (402,033). Smaller religious groups include Muslim (44,419), Hindu (6,114), and Buddhist (205). Life expectancy in the city is 70 years, which, although slightly below the national level, is higher than the provincial figure.

== Economy ==
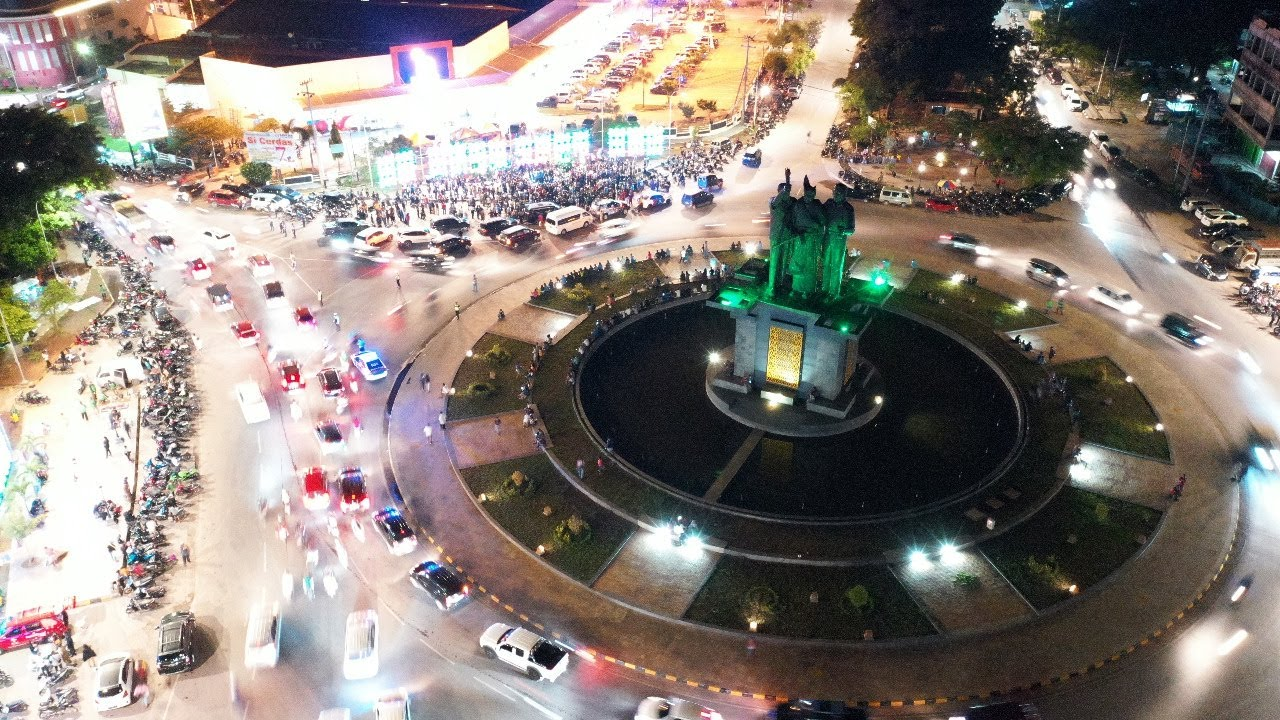
Kupang city at night

The largest contributor to the local economy is the service sector, which provides 48.29% of the city's gross regional product and provides employment for 79.34% of the city's workforce. Meanwhile, the primary sector (which comprises agriculture and mining) only provides 2.33% of the city's gross regional product. Other significant economic areas include construction (16.29%), transportation (9.42%), finance and insurance (7.38%), and real estate (3.03%).

This economic profile significantly differs from that of neighbouring regions, which still rely on agriculture and resource extraction as the primary contributor to their economies. The amount of land used for agriculture in Kupang decreased by 41% from 2018 to 2019, while the industrial sector grew by 11% in the same timeframe. Industrial facilities in the city include three cement plants operated by PT Semen Kupang, which, in total, produce approximately 250,000 tons per year. This figure, however, has been deemed insufficient by the local government, because the combined yearly cement needs for the province and the neighbouring country of East Timor exceed 1.8 million tons per year. This gave rise to a plan by the provincial government to take over ownership of PT Semen Kupang in 2020 to increase production.

The city experienced deflation with an annual rate of 0.5% in 2019. The city experiences average annual inflation figures that are slightly below the national average. As of 2018, there were 31 banks in the city, with credit percentage increases of 53% in the same year, which contributed to the rapid growth of the city's financial sector. In addition, there were 4,534 trade companies registered in the city. The city experienced high economic growth, with a figure of 10% in 2019, which was significantly above the national level. In that year, the unemployment rate was 9.78%.

== Governance ==
=== Administrative division ===
As of 2021, Kupang was divided into six districts (kecamatan). The table below shows the area and population of each district according to the 2020 Census and the official estimates as of mid 2025. It also includes the locations of the district administrative centres, the number of administrative villages (all classed as urban kelurahan) in each district, and its postcodes.

Kode Wilayah	Name of District (kecamatan)	Area in km^{2}	Pop'n Census 2020	Pop'on Estimate mid 2025	Admin centre	No. of villages	Post codes
53.71.01	Alak	86.91	76,908	89,014	Penkase Oeleta	12	85231 - 85239
53.71.02	Maulafa	54.80	97,976	112,939	Maulafa	9	85141 - 85148
53.71.04	Oebobo	14.22	100,560	105,936	Oebobo	7	85111 - 85112
53.71.05	Kota Raja	6.10	57,121	60,178	Kota Raja	8	85111 - 85119
53.71.03	Kelapa Lima	15.02	75,486	78,529	Kelapa Lima	5	85228
53.71.06	Kota Lama	3.22	34,725	36,138	Kota Lama	10	85221 - 85229
	Totals	180.27	442,758	482,734		51	

=== Local government ===
As is standard among Indonesian cities, Kupang is governed as a second-level administrative division, which is run by an executive branch consisting of a mayor and vice mayor, and a legislative body in the form of a city parliament. This system of government is approximately equivalent to that of a regency. The mayor, vice mayor, and members of the city parliament are elected by the population of the city. The district heads, however, are appointed directly by the mayor with the recommendation of the city secretary.

=== Politics ===
The city is coterminous with the 1st electoral district of East Nusa Tenggara province (out of a total of 8 electoral districts in the province), which sends 6 members to the 65-seat provincial parliament. The city parliament is made up of 40 representatives, which are divided into five electoral districts. This division can be seen in the table below. The last legislative election was in 2019 and the next one is scheduled to be held in 2024. As the capital of East Nusa Tenggara province, the city is also home to the provincial parliament building and the governor's office.

Electoral District	Comprising	Representatives
Kupang 1st	Kota Raja District	6
Kupang 2nd	Kelapa Lima & Kota Lama Districts	11
Kupang 3rd	Oebobo District	9
Kupang 4th	Maulafa District	8
Kupang 5th	Alak District	6
Total		40

== Infrastructure ==
=== Health ===
As of 2021, there are 10 hospitals, 45 puskesmas (Community healthcare center), 15 polyclinics, and 33 pharmacies in the city. There are two international-class hospitals in the city, which are Siloam Hospital and Kupang Vertical Technical Implementation Unit Hospital. The latter is expected to become the tertiary referral hospital of East Nusa Tenggara province and the neighbouring country of East Timor after its completion in June 2022. The W. Z. Johannes Regional Public Hospital, located in Oebobo district, is owned by the city government, while army hospitals run by the Indonesian Army such as the Wirasakti Hospital (also located in Oebobo District) and the Naval Army Hospital (located in Alak District) also provide public healthcare. The city contains several medical laboratories, which are used for various purposes such as water and food testing, agricultural and animal health, and medical sample testing. Two biomolecular laboratories were inaugurated in 2020.

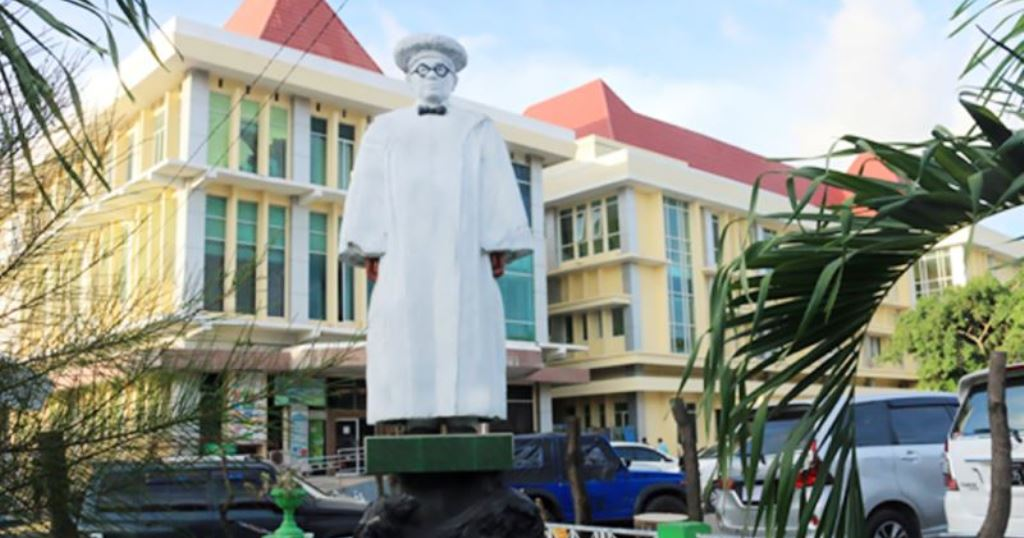
W. Z. Johannes Regional Hospital

=== Education ===
The city contains 122 kindergartens, 150 elementary schools, 59 junior high schools, 42 senior high schools, 24 vocational high schools, and 16 higher education institutions. Oebobo District hosts the largest number of schools, while Kota Lama District hosts the least. One of the most notable universities in the city is the University of Nusa Cendana, located in Kelapa Lima District, which is also the oldest university in the province. Other universities and higher education institutions include Artha Wacana Christian University, Widya Mandira Catholic University, and Kupang State Polytech of Agriculture.

=== Place of worship ===
As of 2021, the city contained 69 mosques, 327 churches, seven Hindu temples, and one Chinese Buddhist temple.

== Transportation ==
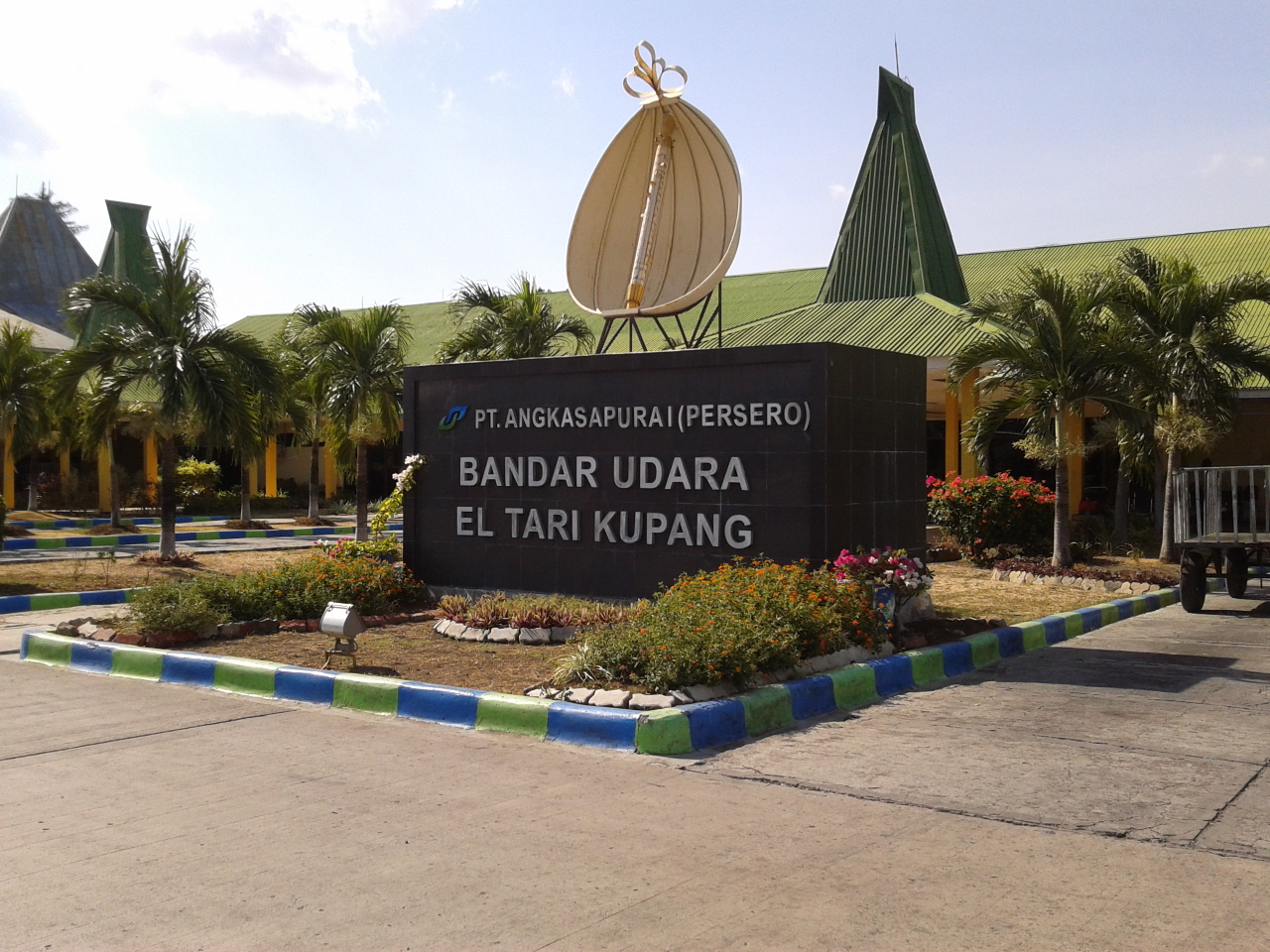
El Tari Airport

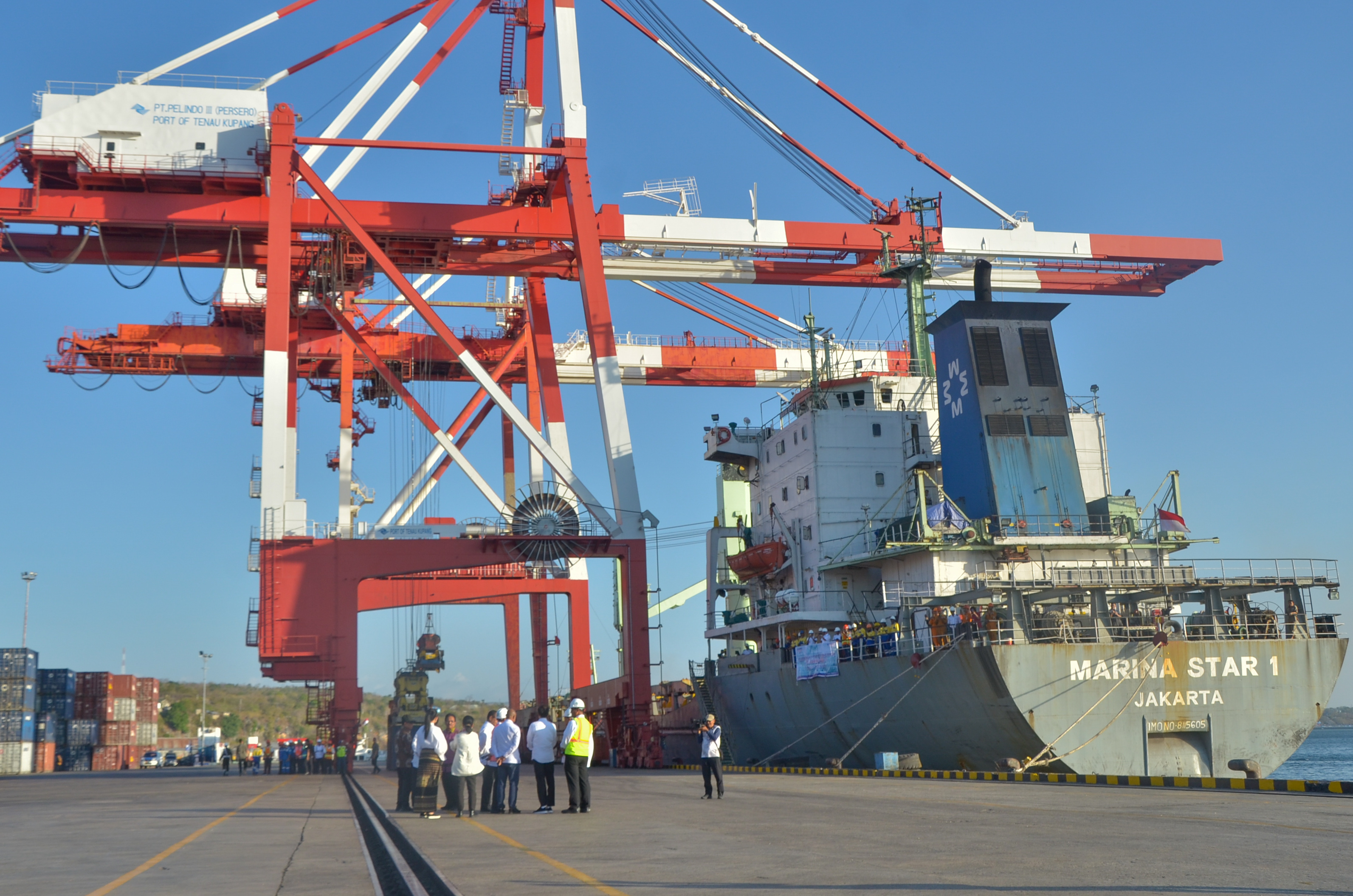
Tenau Port, Kupang

As of 2021, there were a total of 1,665.93 kilometers of road within the city, of which 1,423.05 kilometers had been paved with asphalt. The city is served by El Tari Airport, which in 2019 saw 936,159 arrivals and 992,048 departures. The main port of the city, Tenau International Port, saw 176,888 arrivals and 204,919 departures. In addition, the port also saw a total movement of 234,945 tons of goods in 2020.

In September 2020, the city launched its first bus rapid transit system to improve public transportation in the city, especially for students. The BRT system, named Trans Kota, has four lines and operates from 08:00 to 16:00. However, this was met with opposition from owners and drivers of local share taxi services (bemo or angkot), on the grounds that a BRT system would threaten their jobs. The city is also served by app-based ride-hailing services such as Grab and Gojek.

== See also ==
- List of colonial Residents of Dutch Timor
- History of Timor
- List of regencies and cities of Indonesia
