= Lamaholot language =

Austonesian language spoken in Indonesia

Lamaholot
- Solorese
- Native to: Indonesia
- Region: Flores and Solor
- Ethnicity: Lamaholot people
- Native speakers: 180,000 (2010)
- Language family: Austronesian: Malayo-Polynesian; Central–Eastern MP; Flores–Lembata; Lamaholot

Language codes
- ISO 639-3: Variously: aol – Alor adr – Adonara lmr – Lamalera slp – Lamaholot ila – Ile Ape lwt – Lewotobi lvu – Levuka lmj – West Lembata lmf – South Lembata lmq – Lamatuka lwe – Lewo Eleng
- Glottolog: lama1277 Lamaholot puka1244 Pukaunu

Lamaholot, also known as Solor or Solorese, is a Central Malayo-Polynesian dialect cluster of Flores, Indonesia. The varieties may not be all mutually intelligible; Keraf (1978) reports that there are 18 languages under the name.

The Lamaholot language shows evidence of a Papuan (non-Austronesian) substratum, with about 50 percent of the lexicon being non-Austronesian.

Various Lamaholot dialects are presented as independent languages by Ethnologue. For example, Lewotobi is presented as a separate language by Ethnologue and Grimes (1997). Nagaya (2011) disputes this, classifying it instead as a dialect of Lamaholot.

An additional dialect of Lamaholot not found in Ethnologue, Muhang, is spoken by the Ata Tana 'Ai people living in Sikka Regency. The first children's book in Muhang, Walde Nenang Uran Wair, was published in 2022.

Lamaholot is similar to Sikka to the west and Kedang to the east. Lamaholot dialects are often divided into three groupings: western (on Flores), central (in East Flores, Adonara, and Solor) and eastern (on Lembata). Alorese (spoken on parts of the coast of northern Pantar and northwestern Alor) is partially intelligible with Lamaholot and is often considered to be a dialect of it.

== Phonology ==
=== Consonants ===
		Labial	Dental/ Alveolar	Palatal	Velar	Glottal
Plosive/ Affricate	voiceless	p	t̪	(t͡ʃ)	k	ʔ
Plosive/ Affricate	voiced	b	d	(d͡ʒ)	g	
Fricative	voiceless	(f)	s			h
Fricative	voiced	(v)				
Nasal		m	n	(ɲ)	ŋ	
Trill			r			
Lateral			l			
Approximant		w		j		

Phonemes in parentheses are used in loanwords.

=== Vowels ===
	Front	Central	Back
Close	i ĩ		u ũ
Mid		ə ə̃	o õ
Open-mid	ɛ ɛ̃		
Open		a ã	

== Bibliography ==
- Kroon, Yosep Bisara (2016). A grammar of Solor – Lamaholot: a language of Flores, Eastern Indonesia (Ph.D. thesis). University of Adelaide. doi:10.4225/55/5823cd4c017f4 (inactive 1 July 2025). hdl:2440/102380.
- Nagaya, Naonori (2011). The Lamaholot Language of Eastern Indonesia (Ph.D. thesis). Rice University. hdl:1911/70366.
- Michels, Marc (2017). Western Lamaholot: a cross-dialectal grammar sketch (Master's thesis). Leiden University. hdl:1887/52580.
- Fricke, Hanna L. (2019). Traces of language contact: The Flores-Lembata languages in eastern Indonesia (Ph.D. thesis). Leiden University. hdl:1887/80399.
