= Delha Affair =

1960 Indonesian civil conflict

- Date: May–July 1960
- Location: Rote Ndao Regency, East Nusa Tenggara, Indonesia
- Caused by: Dispute over taxation between villagers and the government
- Goals: Decrease taxation of villagers
- Methods: Demonstrations and Riots
- Result: Multiple deaths and ~59 houses destroyed

Parties
Local and national government	Villagers Supported by: PNI PKI

Lead figures
Various officials	Matheos Petrus

Number
13	≥100

Casualties and losses
2 dead	2 dead

Casualties
- Buildings destroyed: ~59

The Delha Affair, sometimes known as the Nusak Delha Affair, was a civil conflict and dispute that led to an uprising in May 1960 in Rote Ndao Regency, East Nusa Tenggara, Indonesia. The cause of the conflict was a dispute about the amount of taxation owed by villagers to the government. The villagers — led by ex-army officer Matheos Petrus — argued for a lower taxation rate. The matter escalated further when the Indonesian National Party (PNI) became involved and supported the cause of the villagers, resulting in a demonstration against the governor of the province during his visit. Later, the Communist Party of Indonesia (PKI) also became involved and supported Matheos' cause in return of being allowed to establish a branch in the village. It culminated in a clash between local officials escorted by police that visited the village attacked and the villagers, resulting in the deaths of two police officers and two villagers. At the end, fearing reprisals from police, the villagers scorched down their village causing brief waves of refugees to neighbouring villages. While some officials accused PKI as the cause of the conflict, it was later found that PKI's involvement was minimal.

== Background ==
The term Nusak traditionally referred to small autonomous polities within the island of Rote usually consisted of villages. These polities acted as small kingdoms led by a king called Manek. There are 19 traditional Nusak within the island. Since the arrival of Europeans to the region, there have been several wars and rebellions by these Nusaks primarily against the Dutch government such as by Nusak Ndao in 1575, Nusak Bilba in 1576, Nusak Dengka in 1660, and Nusak Thie in 1746, among others. Within the 20th century, there were also several more recent uprisings by Nusaks that were mainly driven by wider anti-taxation movement within the Lesser Sunda Islands region such as in 1932.^{:77} For a while in the aftermath of post-independence era, there was no anti-taxation movement that could be compared to past movements until the Nusak Delha Affair in 1960, which argued for lower taxation.^{:77-78}

== Events ==
The root of the conflict can be traced back to 1950 with the key figure of the event, Matheos Petrus whom was a retired army officer from the village of Bo'a within Nusak Delha. There are differing sources regarding his actual name, with some records mentioning his name as Matheus Feo.^{:79} Matheos gathered support from villagers and churches around the village to petition the local government to have a lower tax of Rp 3,75 per year, which was lower than what the Rote Ndao local government had set up. The actual amount of tax set up by the local government is unknown.^{:80} Matheos further pursued his campaign by sending a letter directly to the president Sukarno asking him to pressure the local government to lower the tax.^{:80} As the campaign gained traction within villagers, Indonesian National Party decided to also support the cause which led to mass demonstration against governor of East Nusa Tenggara at that time, Sarimin Reksodihardjo, during his visit to the island.^{:80} Several villages within Nusak Delha had been refusing to pay their taxes to the local government within the past 10 years, which prompted the Rote Ndao government to form a special operation to collect taxes. While most villages eventually paid their due amount, Bo'a village still refused to pay their current tax rate unless it were lowered.^{:81} The provincial government had been sending delegates to meet with Manek of Delha, Abner Ndoen regarding the situation so that he could help the government to collect taxation from the village on 22 October 1959. Ndoen then held a meeting between villagers in front of his residence with the officials and delegates, where villagers and officials discussed the tax rate. During this discussion, Matheos spoke that he is not against the government or a rebel, but rather that people asked him to be their leader to petition government to lower taxation and sent a letter to the president Sukarno.^{:81-82} This resulted in Matheos being called to the police headquarters in Ba'a town, capital of Rote Ndao, where he was questioned. Feeling threatened and losing his position to bargain with the government, Matheos turned to the Communist Party of Indonesia (PKI) in Ba'a which resulted in the PKI opening a branch within Nusak Delha on 1 January 1960.^{:81}

On 25 January 1960, Ndoen sent a letter to the provincial government requesting assistance to deal with what he perceived as a communist infiltration after the PKI — supported by Matheos — opened a branch on his Nusak without the permission of the local government. On 10 May 1960, the provincial government supported by Rote Ndao parliament sent a team of 13 people consisted of Nusak Delha officials, member of local government, and police personnel to collect the taxes personally from Bo'a village. On 14 May 1960 15:00 Central Indonesia Time, the team arrived at Bo'a village and visited the local tax collector house. However, the official from the village was not there and the team was asked by his wife to wait. However, after waiting, the team decided to leave which was followed by insults by the wife of the official. This was followed by the emergence of several warriors from the village armed with clubs, which resulted in the police firing warning shots. Around 100 villagers then stormed the team resulting in a clash that caused the deaths of two police and two villagers.^{:84-87} Several of the team's personal weapons were taken by the villagers and the team fled to the nearby Nemberala village using horses.^{:87-88} The event was reported to the provincial government by Ndoen in a letter on 16 May 1960. Fearing reprisals from police, the villagers burned down their own village and fled on 17 May 1960, resulting in influx of refugee within nearby the nearby areas of Nusak Oenale, Thie, and Dengka.^{:89-90}

The ensuing violence resulted in the central government sending the army and police Mobile Brigade Corps to secure the region, as well as a relief effort led by El Tari.^{90-92}

== Aftermath ==
Many government officials and locals blamed the PKI for the event, steming from accusation that the PKI was the one encouraging people in Nusak Delha — especially Bo'a village — not to pay taxes. However, this later turned out to be untrue and PKI involvement was indirect and small.^{:92} Around 59 houses were burnt down during the first day of the violence. The refugee situation persisted until around July 1960. It became the last uprising of Nusak within the island and the only uprising of its type to happen in post-independence Indonesia.^{:77-80}
