= Lembata language =

There are several undocumented languages of Lembata. Lembata language may refer to any of these, but especially:

- West Lembata language
- South Lembata language
