= KSX =

KSX or ksx may refer to:

- Kedang language (iso-639-3 code: ksx), an Austronesian language spoken in Flores, Indonesia
- Kings Cross railway station, Sydney, Australia (station code: KSX), a railway station on the Eastern Suburbs Line
- Kotshila Junction railway station, West Bengal, India (station code: KSX), a railway station in the South Eastern Railway Zone
- Yasuru Airport (IATA code: KSX), an airport serving Yasuru, Papua New Guinea. See List of airports by IATA code: K.
