= Lamaholot people =

Ata Lamaholot
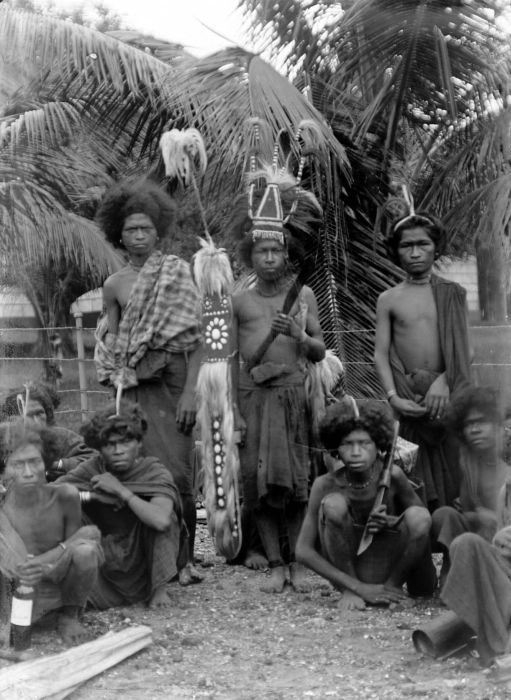
- Young men of Solor in military costume, East Flores.

Total population
- 193,000

Regions with significant populations
- Indonesia (East Nusa Tenggara); Malaysia (Sabah)

Languages
- Lamaholot, Lewotobi, Adonara, Larantuka Malay, and Indonesian

Religion
- Roman Catholicism (predominantly), Islam, and folk religion

Related ethnic groups
- Manggarai • Sikka • Alorese

The Lamahalot or Solorese people are an indigenous ethnic group located on Flores Island, Indonesia, and some smaller islands around it (Solor, Adonara, and Lomblen). Lamaholot people speak the Lamaholot language with different dialects, the number of speakers counts between 150,000 and 200,000.

Lamaholot people's famous traditional dance is a war dance known as Hedung.

== History ==
Since the 16th century the territory of the Lamaholot was the object of the claims of the Sultanate of Makassar, Portugal and the Netherlands. Until the middle of the 19th century Lamaholot were under the Portuguese colonial administration, then under the Netherlands in 1859–1942, and until the middle of the 20th century they were formally submitted to the Rajas of Larantuka and Adonara.

Since the 19th century, many of the Lamaholot people have been migrating to British North Borneo to work in various British plantations. Throughout the Japanese occupation period, many of the Lamaholot, Flores and Javanese people were further taken into British Borneo to serve as part of the Japanese labour forces, which were synonyms throughout the occupation of the Dutch East Indies, where they were stranded when the Japanese began to retreat by the end of the war. By the 20th century, this migration continued, which subsequently established Lamaholot presence within the modern state of Sabah in Malaysia.

== Language ==
The Lamaholot language belongs to the Malayo-Polynesian languages of the Austronesian language family. The language is divided into many dialects, or possibly distinct languages as Adonara language, the most common are the Western Lamaholot (Muhang and Pukaunu), Lamaholot (Lewotaka and Ile Mandiri), Lewo Eleng, and Western Solor. Language is a means lingua franca for wide communication between the numerous ethnic groups living in the area around Larantuka and Solor. On the island of Flores, the Lamaholot people speak Larantuka Malay (Bahasa Nagi), a dialect of the Malay language.

== Religion ==
Most Lamaholot people are Roman Catholics. They converted from the 16th century onwards under Portuguese influence during the Portuguese colonial period. Further conversions occurred during the 20th century due to missionary efforts. A minority are Muslims. Islam has had a presence in the area sometime before the 16th century as Portuguese missionaries reported the established existence of a mosque and Muslims in the islands. A few Lamaholot are devotees of a traditional monotheistic religion who believe in a god whom they call Lera Wulan Tanah Ekan (The combined power of the Sun, Moon, and Earth), death cults and shamanism. The Lamaholot people also preserve rich verbal and musical folklore.

== Family ==
Traditional social organization is strictly based on patrilineal birth. They also maintained a characteristic of descent line that divides into "origin groups" or phratries. Marriages occur across on the matrilateral side, with a marital settlement of patrilocal residence. The family unit is small.

== Economy ==
The main occupation is manual tropical farming. Dominant agricultural crops are such as corn, dried rice, millet, yam, cassava, sweet potato, legumes, pumpkin, various fruits and vegetables. Fishing is developed on the coast. Livestock plays an auxiliary role. The main dietary food includes boiled corn and rice with vegetable and fish seasonings. Residents of a number of coastal villages specialize in intermediary trade in textiles, clothing and agricultural implements. In the Lamalera village on Lomblen island and Lamakera village on Solor island, whaling is developed.

== Lifestyle ==
Traditional cumulus settlements (in the mountains) are surrounded by a dense hedge of corals, houses are skeleton-pillared, rectangular, with a high steep roof. Before the beginning of the 20th century, there were long houses. Modern settlements are coastal farms, the dwelling is designed for a small family. They also adopt Malay-style clothing.
