= Lamalera people =

Ethnic group in Indonesia

Lamalera
Ata Lamalera
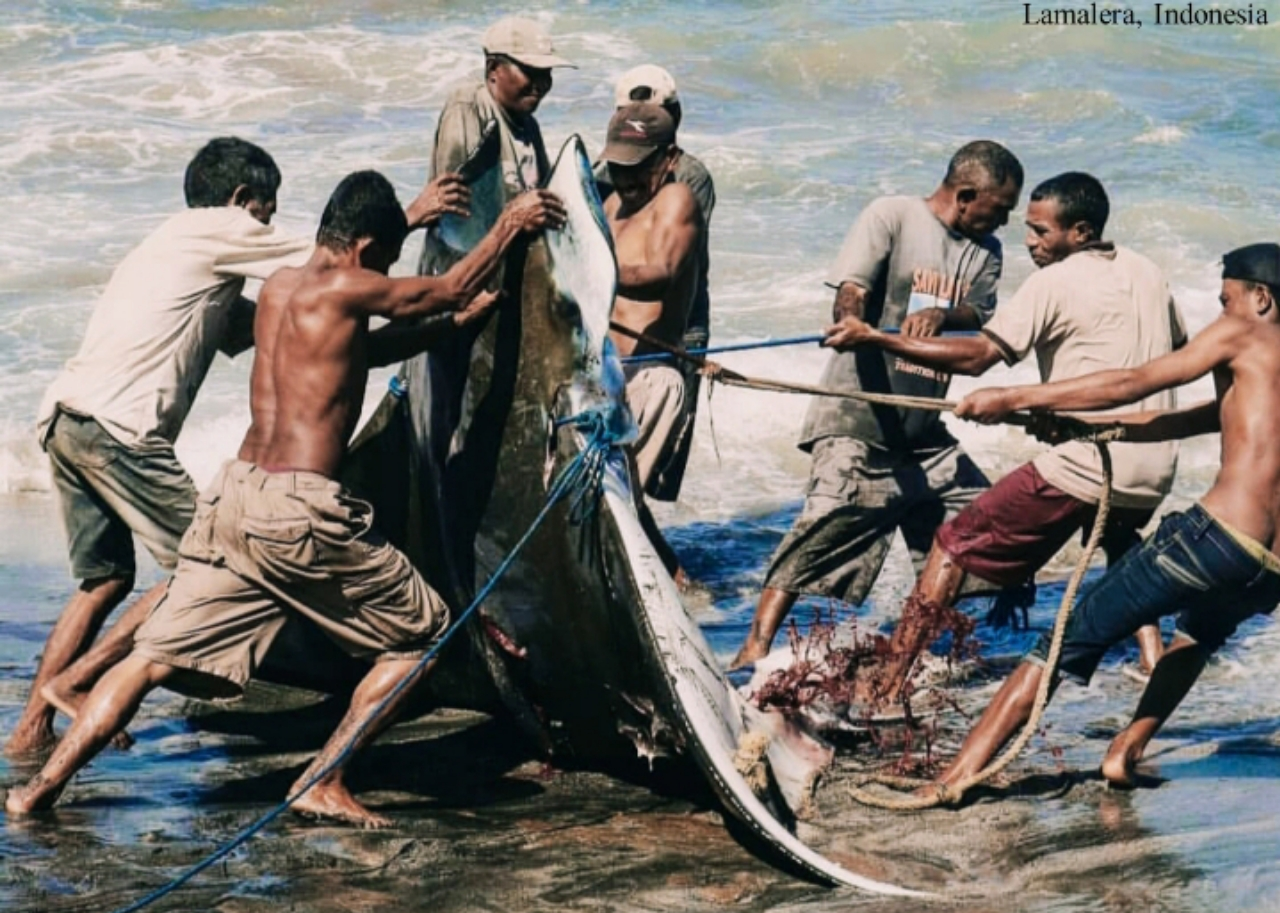
- Traditional whalers of Lamalera.

Total population
- 4,000 (2008)

Regions with significant populations
- Indonesia (Lembata Regency)

Languages
- Lamalera and Lamaholot

Religion
- Catholicism (majority); Islam (minority)

Related ethnic groups
- Lamaholot and Kedang

The Lamalera people (Lamalera: Ata Lamalera) are an ethnic group inhabiting the southern part of Lembata Island, Indonesia. Administratively, they are concentrated in the villages of Lamalera A and Lamalera B, Wulandoni District, Lembata Regency, and several surrounding villages in the district of Wulandoni. Their original language is the Lamalera language, along with Lamaholot, which functions as a lingua franca in the area. Although often referred to as a distinct "ethnic group", anthropologists typically classify the Lamalera people as a sub-group of the Lamaholot people; as such, locals usually call them "the people of Lamalera", referring to the ethnic community inhabiting the island’s southern region.

The Lamalera people are one of two communities of traditional whalers in the Lesser Sunda Islands, along with the village of Lamakera, which claims to be the oldest whaling settlement in Indonesia.

== History ==
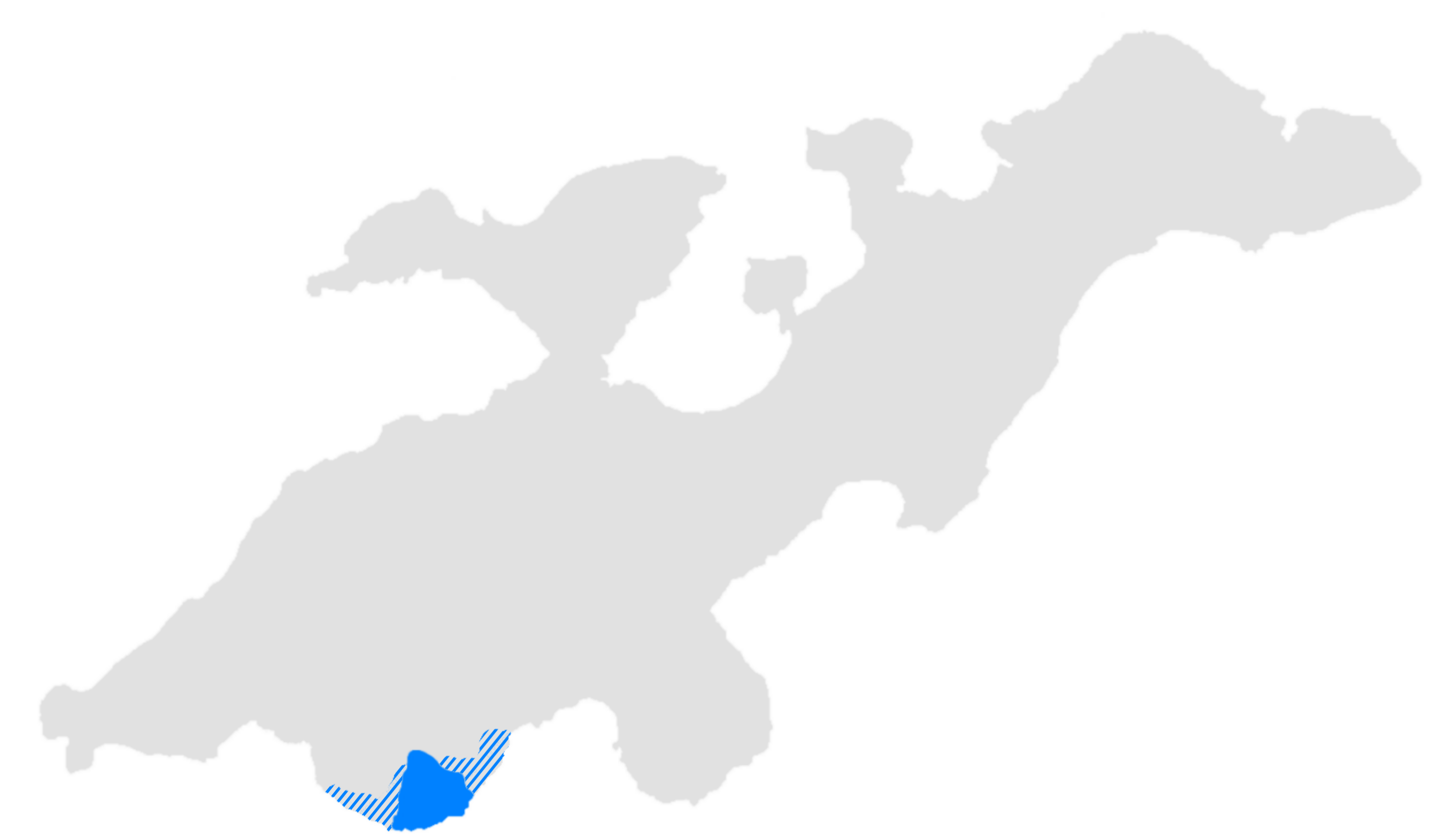
Map of the distribution of the Lamalera people and the Lamalera language on Lembata Island.

According to Ambrosius Oleona and Pieter Tedu Bataona, the ancestors of the Lamalera people did not originate from the indigenous inhabitants of Lembata. Oral histories and genealogical chants known as lia asa-usu ('origin chants') recount that their ancestors came from the Kingdom of Banggai before reaching the southern coast of Lembata and settling there across generations. Their physical traits resemble those of people from Central Sulawesi, particularly the Banggai.

Their ancestors arrived about 500 years ago. Before settling on Lembata, they followed the fleet of Gajah Mada to the waters of Halmahera, then sailed to the Bomberai Peninsula, and later moved south toward Seram, Gorom, Ambon, Banda, Timor, and finally Lembata. Their migration from the Kingdom of Banggai was triggered by attacks and conquest by Majapahit during the reign of Hayam Wuruk. The migrating group became the founders of five lineages: Bataona, Blikololong, Lamanudek, Tanakrofa, and Lefotuka.

These founding lineages gave rise to about nineteen lineages in today’s Lamalera society. For example, Bataona produced the Bediona and Batafor houses; Lefotuka (also called Lewotukan) produced Dasion and Kedang. This Kedang lineage (sometimes spelled Kéda) is unrelated to the Kedang people of eastern Lembata.

The Lamalera customary government operates under the lika-telo ("three hearths") system, represented by the Blikololong, Bataona, and Lewotukan lineages. During the colonial Dutch East Indies era, Lewotukan held administrative authority under the title kakang, the head of Lamalera. Recorded kakang include Muran Kedang and Bao Dasion.

In the Republic of Indonesia, administrative affairs are handled by a village head, but the lika-telo still holds primary cultural authority, especially regarding whaling traditions.

The Lamalera are known for their tradition of hunting sperm whale (baleo), known as leva nuang, practiced since the 16th–17th centuries.

Portuguese records also mention whale hunters on Lembata.

Whaling occurs during the fishing season of May, known as lewa, using traditional boats called peledang. The Lamalera have a legend about a white sperm whale known as "Timor Tom", featured in American author Herman Melville’s 1851 classic Moby-Dick. In their belief, the white whale is the guardian of boats and their construction. Thomas Beale referred to Timor Tom as "the protagonist of many strange tales".

== Religion ==
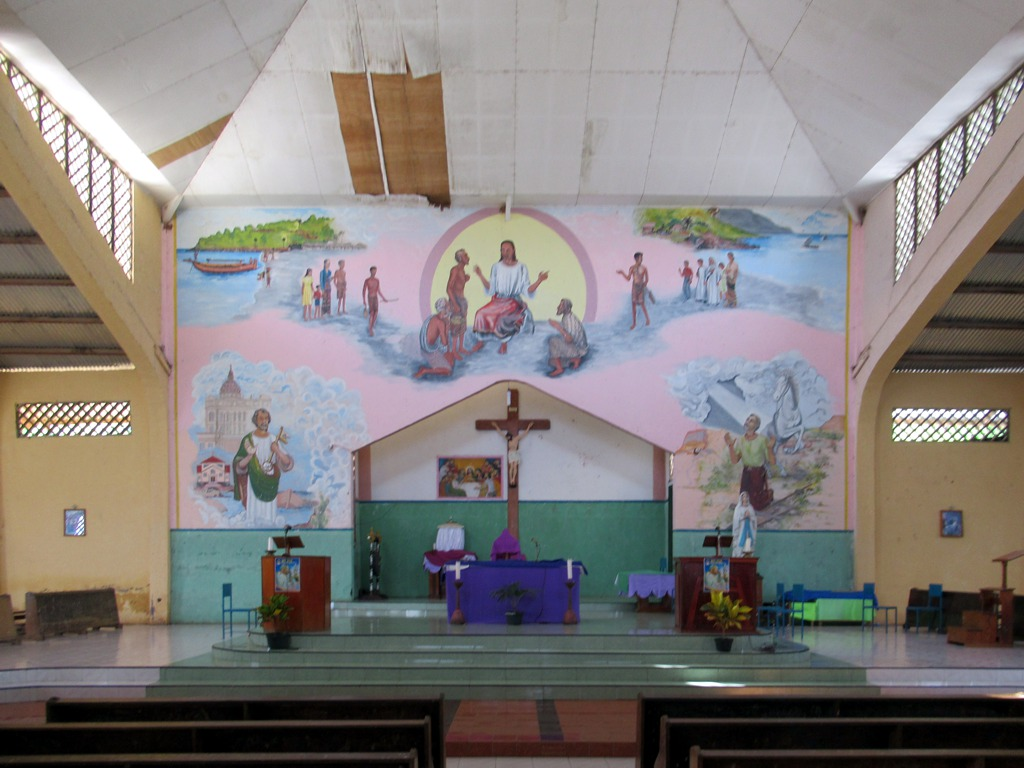
Sts. Peter–Paul Catholic Church in Lamalera A.

The Lamalera people are predominantly Catholic. This is reflected in the Misa Leva, asking divine blessing for the leva season held each 2 May–30 September.

Meanwhile, Islam predominates in nearby coastal settlements.

== Notable people ==
- Gorys Keraf, Indonesian linguist
- Anton Tifaona, Indonesian police general
- Vivick Tjangkung, Indonesian actress and police officer

== See also ==
- Lamaholot people
- Lamakera people
- Kedang people
