= LWE =

LWE may denote:

- Learning with errors, a computational problem used in cryptography
- Lightweight Ethernet, a nickname for the IEC 61162-450 protocol
- Latin World Entertainment
- Left-wing extremism, more commonly known as far-left politics
- the ISO 639 code for the Lewo Eleng language
- the IATA code for Wonopito Airport
- Lincoln-Way East High School
