= LMQ (disambiguation) =

LMQ may refer to:

- Marsa Brega Airport, the IATA code LMQ
- LMQ (esports), a League of Legends team
- ISO 639:lmq, the ISO 639 code for the Lamatuka language
