= East Nusa Tenggara =

Province in Lesser Sunda Islands, Indonesia

East Nusa Tenggara Nusa Tenggara Timur
- Province
- Province of East Nusa Tenggara; Provinsi Nusa Tenggara Timur
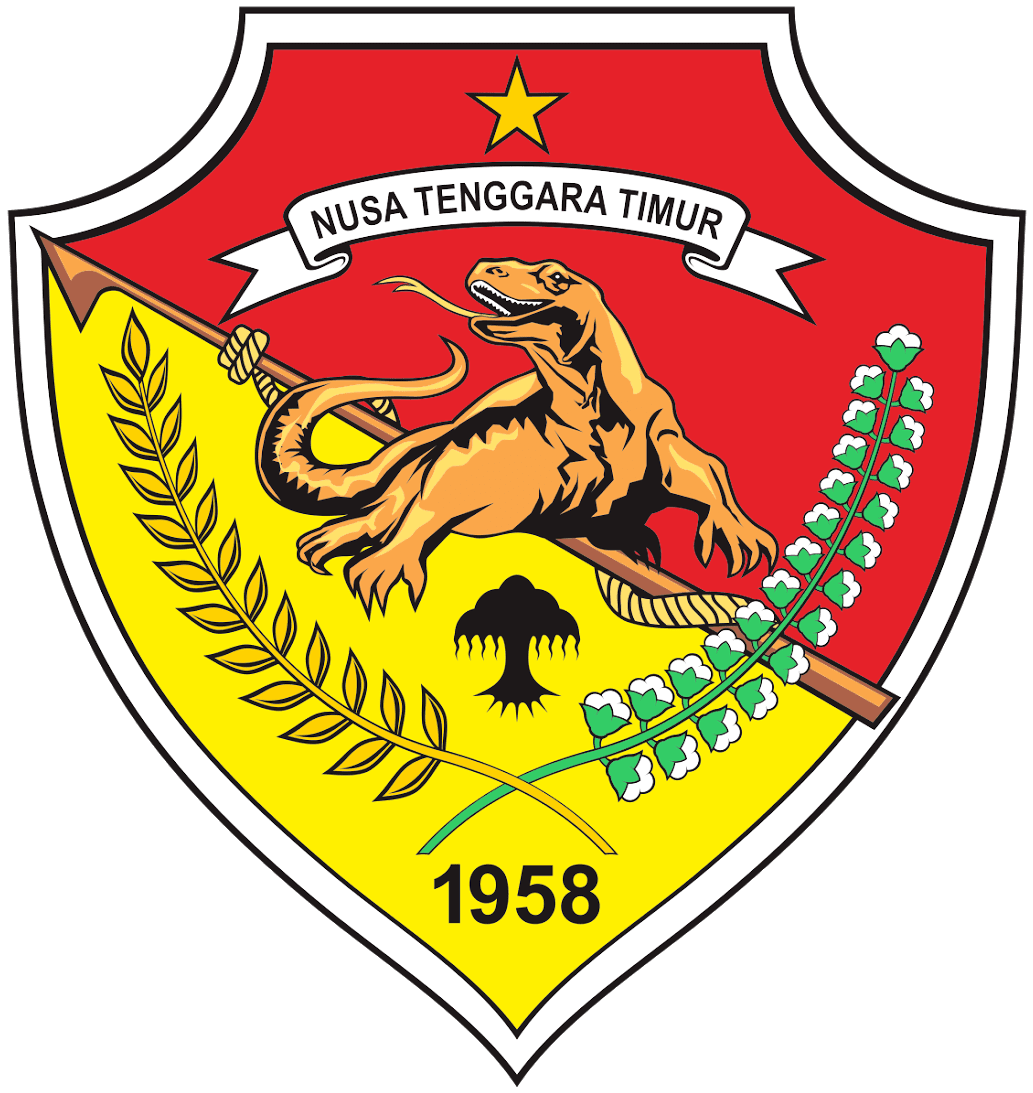
- Coat of arms

- East Nusa Tenggara in Indonesia
- Interactive map of East Nusa Tenggara
- Coordinates: 10°10′18″S 123°36′27″E
- Country: Indonesia
- Region: Lesser Sunda Islands (Eastern Indonesia)
- Established: 14 August 1958
- Capital and largest city: Kupang

Government
  - Body: East Nusa Tenggara Provincial Government
  - Governor: Emanuel Melkiades Laka Lena (Golkar)
  - Vice Governor: Johanis Asadoma
  - Legislature: East Nusa Tenggara Regional House of Representatives (DPRD)

Area
  - Total: 46,378.11 km^{2} (17,906.69 sq mi)
  - Rank: 13th in Indonesia
- Highest elevation (Mount Mutis): 2,427 m (7,963 ft)

Population (mid 2025 Estimate)
  - Total: 5,742,460
  - Rank: 12th in Indonesia
  - Density: 123.818/km^{2} (320.688/sq mi)

Demographics
  - Ethnic groups (2010): 81.18% Indigenous East Nusa Tenggarans (Atoni, Manggarai, Sumba, Lamaholot, Ngada, Tetun, Rotenese, Li'o, Alorese, Savu, etc.); 14.51% Borneoans 1.17% Javanese; 3.14% others
  - Religion (2024): 90.01% Christianity; 54.07% Catholicism; 35.94% Protestantism; 9.35% Islam; 0.55% Marapu; 0.08% Hinduism; 0.01% other
  - Languages: Indonesian (official); Kupang Malay (lingua franca); Uab Meto, Manggarai, Tetun, Sumba, Li'o, Lamaholot, Sikka, Rotenese, Savu, Bunak, Ngada, Kedang, Alorese, Larantuka Malay, Blagar, Palu'e, Komodo, Kui, and others (regional)
- Time zone: UTC+8 (Indonesia Central Time)
- ISO 3166 code: ID-NT
- GDP (nominal): 2022
- Total: Rp 118,718 billion (27th); US$ 8.00 billion US$ 24.95 billion (PPP)
- Per capita: Rp 21.72 million (34th); US$ 1,462; US$ 4,564 (PPP)
- Growth: ▲5.25%
- HDI (2024): ▲0.691 (33rd) – (Medium)
- Website: nttprov.go.id

East Nusa Tenggara (Indonesian: Nusa Tenggara Timur; NTT; Indonesian pronunciation: [ˌnusa təŋˌɡara ˈtimʊr], lit. 'East Southeast Islands') is the southernmost province of Indonesia. It is the eastern portion of the Lesser Sunda Islands, facing the Indian Ocean in the south and the Flores Sea in the north, with a total land area of 46,378.11 km^{2}. It consists of some 653 islands (excluding smaller unnamed ones), with the largest ones being Sumba (10,899.41 km^{2} in area), Flores (15,482.42 km^{2}), and the western part of Timor (14,079.36 km^{2}); the latter shares a land border with the separate nation of Timor-Leste. Also substantial in land area are Alor (2,918.75 km^{2}) and Lembata (1,263.77 km^{2}). The province is subdivided into twenty-one regencies and the regency-level city of Kupang, which is the capital and largest city.

Archaeological research shows that Liang Bua cave in East Nusa Tenggara has been inhabited by humans since about 190,000 years ago. The site was home to early humans, including Homo floresiensis, who were found in the cave's archaeological layers.

East Nusa Tenggara is known for its natural environment and parks, including Komodo National Park, Labuan Bajo, Lake Kelimutu and the area's beaches. The province is rich in culture, with diverse tribes, languages, and traditions such as ikat weaving and the Pasola ceremony in Sumba. East Nusa Tenggara also has a strong missionary history, seen from the majority Catholic population and is one of the two Indonesian provinces where Roman Catholicism is the predominant religion, alongside South Papua. In addition, its marine ecosystem is very rich, making it a popular destination for divers.

== History ==
After the declaration of Indonesian independence in 1945, the eastern part of Indonesia declared the State of East Indonesia. The state was further included in the United States of Indonesia as part of the agreement with the Dutch contained in the transfer of sovereignty to Indonesia in 1949.

In 1950, United States of Indonesia dissolved itself into a unitary state and began to divide its component area into provinces. In 1958, by Indonesian law (Undang-Undang) No. 64/1958, three provinces were established in the Lesser Sunda Islands: Bali, West Nusa Tenggara and East Nusa Tenggara. These three provinces remain unaltered to the present time, although proposals for division have been considered by the Indonesian government but have been deferred due to the moratorium since 2013 on the creation of additional provinces. The area of East Nusa Tenggara province included the western part of Timor island, Flores, Sumba and many smaller islands in the region.

The province was originally (from 1958) sub-divided into twelve regencies, but on 11 April 1996, the City of Kupang, was separated from Kupang Regency and given regency-level status. Then, following the fall of the Suharto regime in 1998 and the passage of a new regional autonomy law, there was a dramatic subdividing (known as pemekaran) of regional governments across Indonesia, at both provincial and regency level. Between 1999 and 2012, nine new regencies were created in East Nusa Tenggara by the division of existing regencies:

- On 4 October 1999, a new Lembata Regency (Regional code 53.13) was formed by the division of the East Flores Regency.
- On 10 April 2002, Rote Island and adjacent islands were split off from Kupang Regency, to form a new Rote Ndao Regency (53.14).
- On 25 February 2003, Manggarai Regency was split into two and a new West Manggarai Regency (53.15) was established.
- On 2 January 2007, the administration of East Nusa Tenggara province was expanded by the establishment of three new regencies
  – Nagekeo (53.16) was cut out of Ngada Regency, and Central Sumba (53.17) and Southwest Sumba (53.18) were both cut out of West Sumba Regency.
- On 17 July 2007 a new regency of East Manggarai (53.19) was cut out of Manggarai Regency.
- On 29 October 2008 a further regency – Sabu Raijua (53.20) (the Savu Islands group) – was formed from part of the remaining Kupang Regency.
- On 14 December 2012 yet another regency – Malaka (53.21) – was created out of the southern half of Belu Regency.

Therefore, as from early 2013, there are twenty-one regencies plus the one autonomous city (Kupang) in the province.

== Geography ==
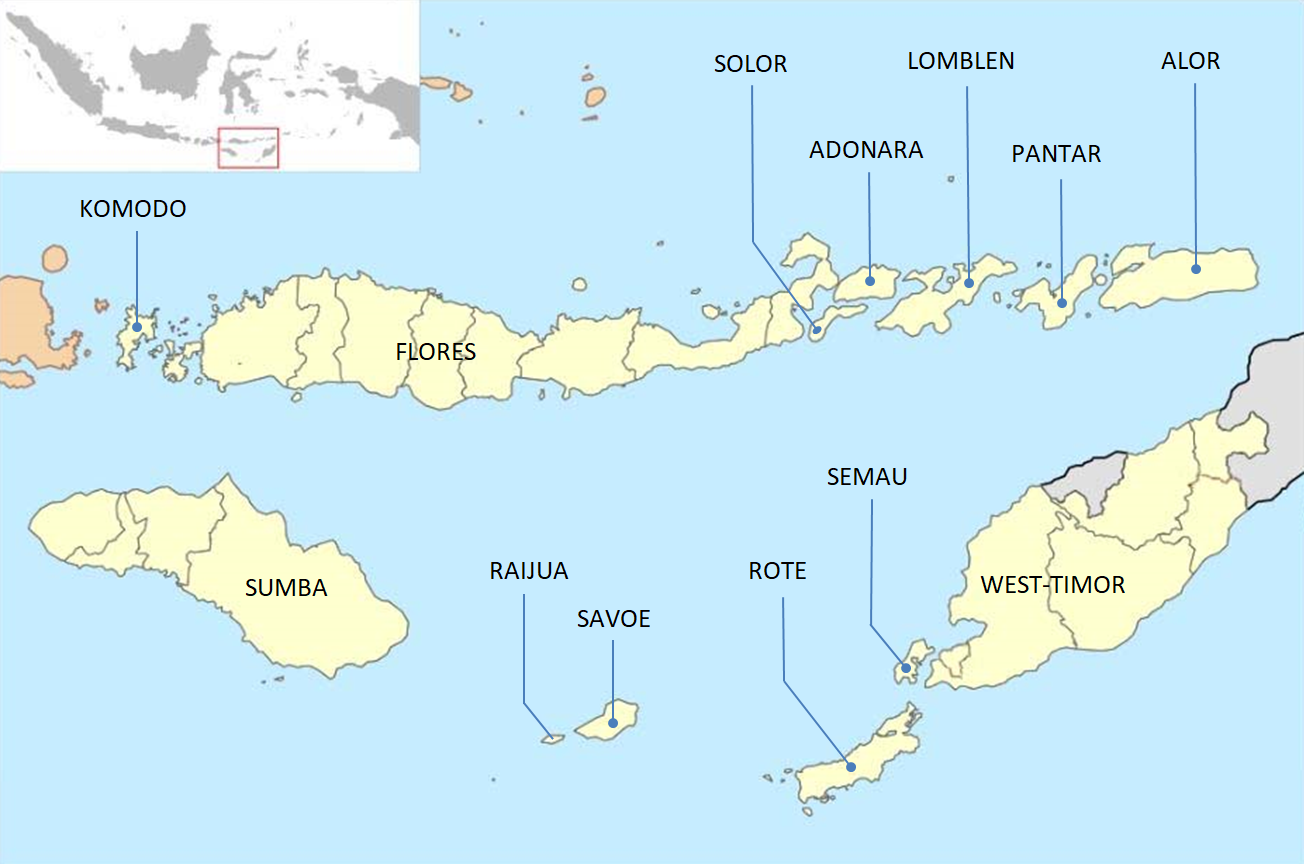
East Nusa Tenggara and its islands, also showing the boundaries between regencies on the three principal islands.

Located in the east of Lesser Sunda Islands, East Nusa Tenggara faces the Indian Ocean in the south and the Flores Sea in the north. This province borders Timor-Leste (East Timor) in the western part of Timor island, and is also close to the province of West Nusa Tenggara (Nusa Tenggara Barat) and the province of Maluku.

The province consists of about 566 islands, the largest and most dominant are Flores, Sumba, and the western part of Timor. The smaller islands include Adonara, Alor, Komodo, Lembata (formerly called Lomblen), Menipo, Pantar, Raijua, Rincah, Rote Island, Savu, Semau, and Solor. While Rote is the southernmost part of Indonesian territory, the Australian territory of the Ashmore and Cartier Islands, 170 kms due south from Rote, is actually much closer to that island than to any point on the Australian mainland, and they lie in zones designated for 'traditional' fishing by Indonesians.

The highest point in the province is Mount Mutis in the South Central Timor Regency, 2,427 metres above sea level. In East Nusa Tenggara, the Terumbu Karang Sehat Indonesia coral-reef programme implemented by Konservasi Indonesia has included work in East Sumba within the Savu Sea marine-national-park zoning area.

Landscapes of East Nusa Tenggara

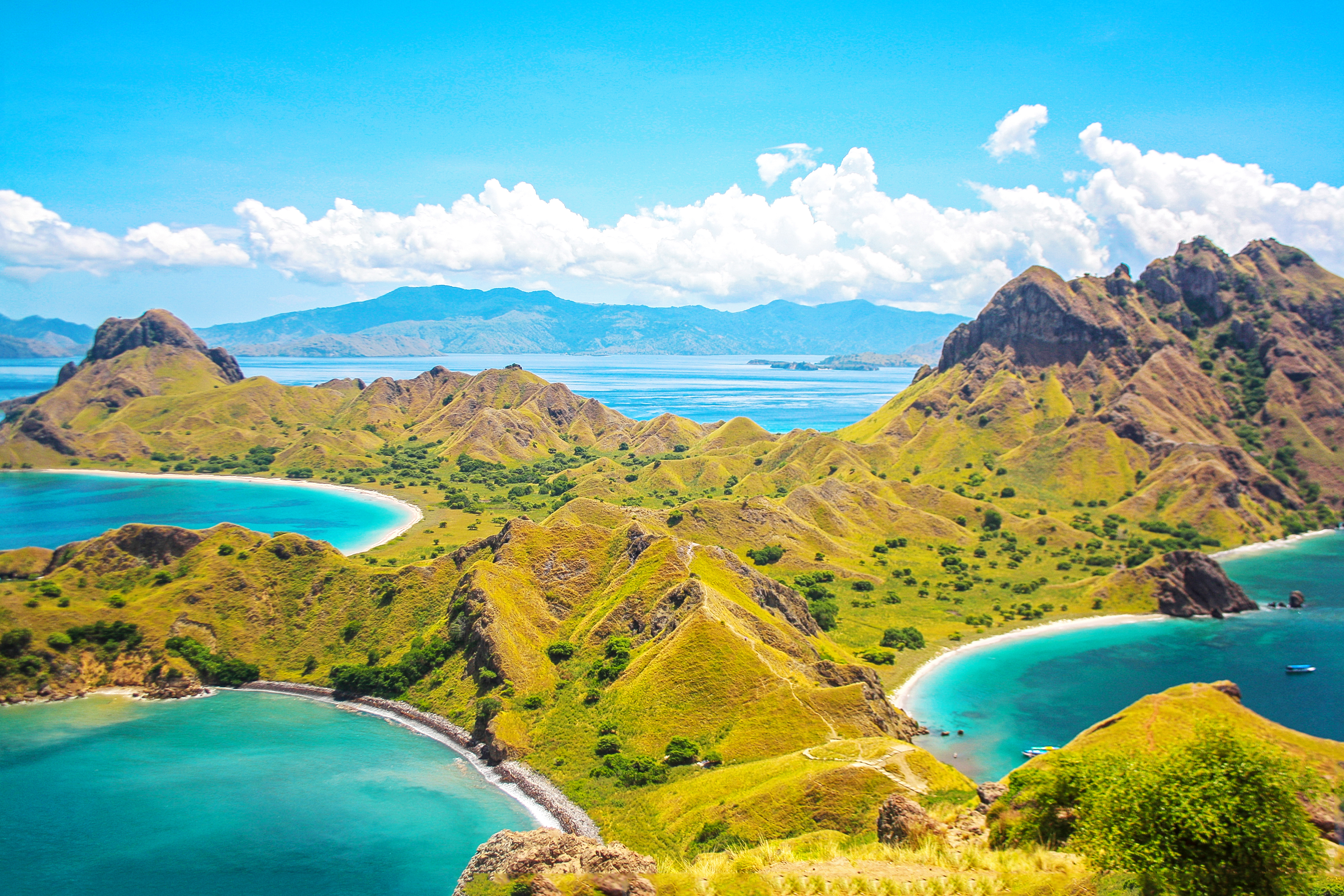
Padar Island, Komodo Island

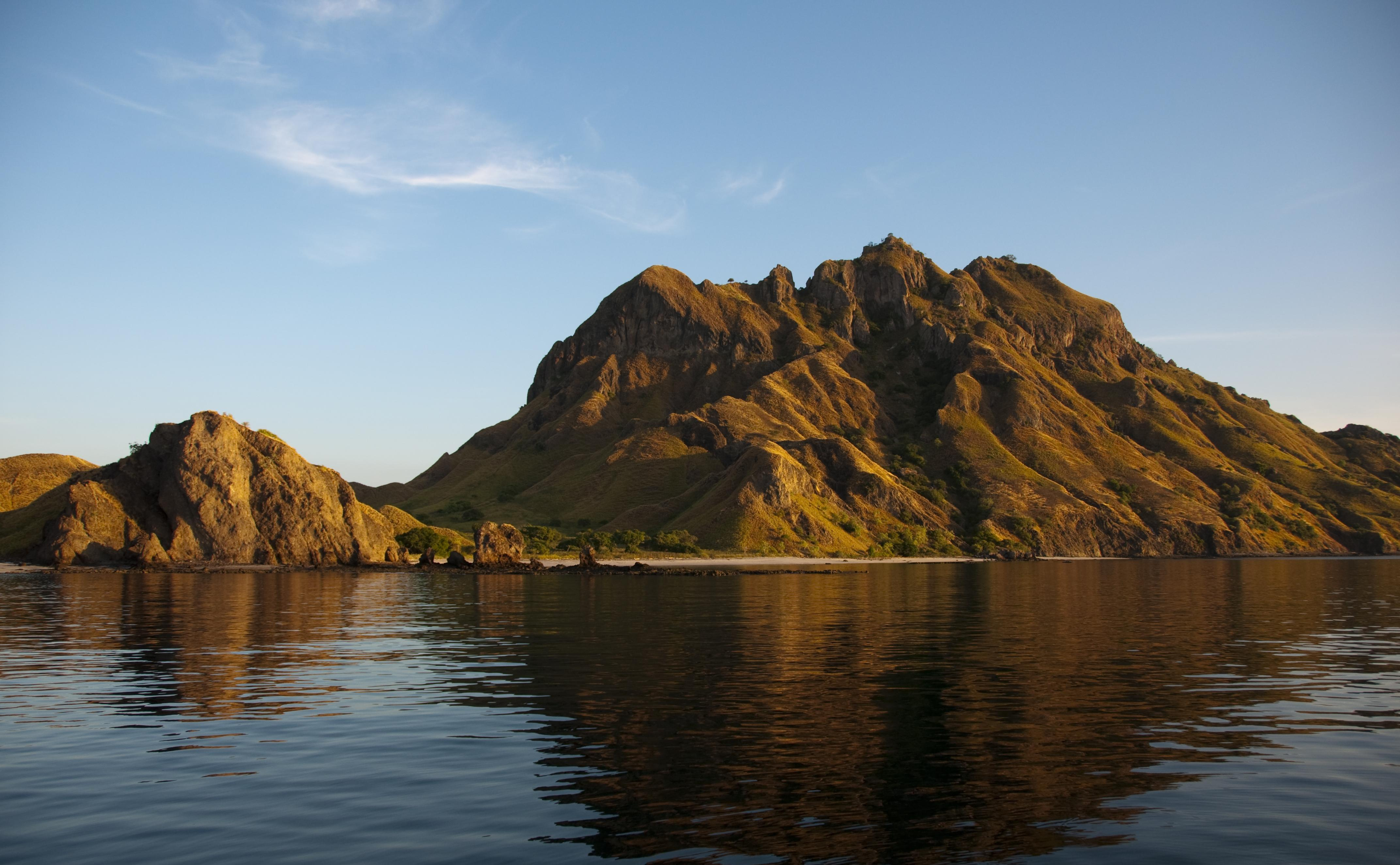
Komodo, one of the small islands in East Nusa Tenggara

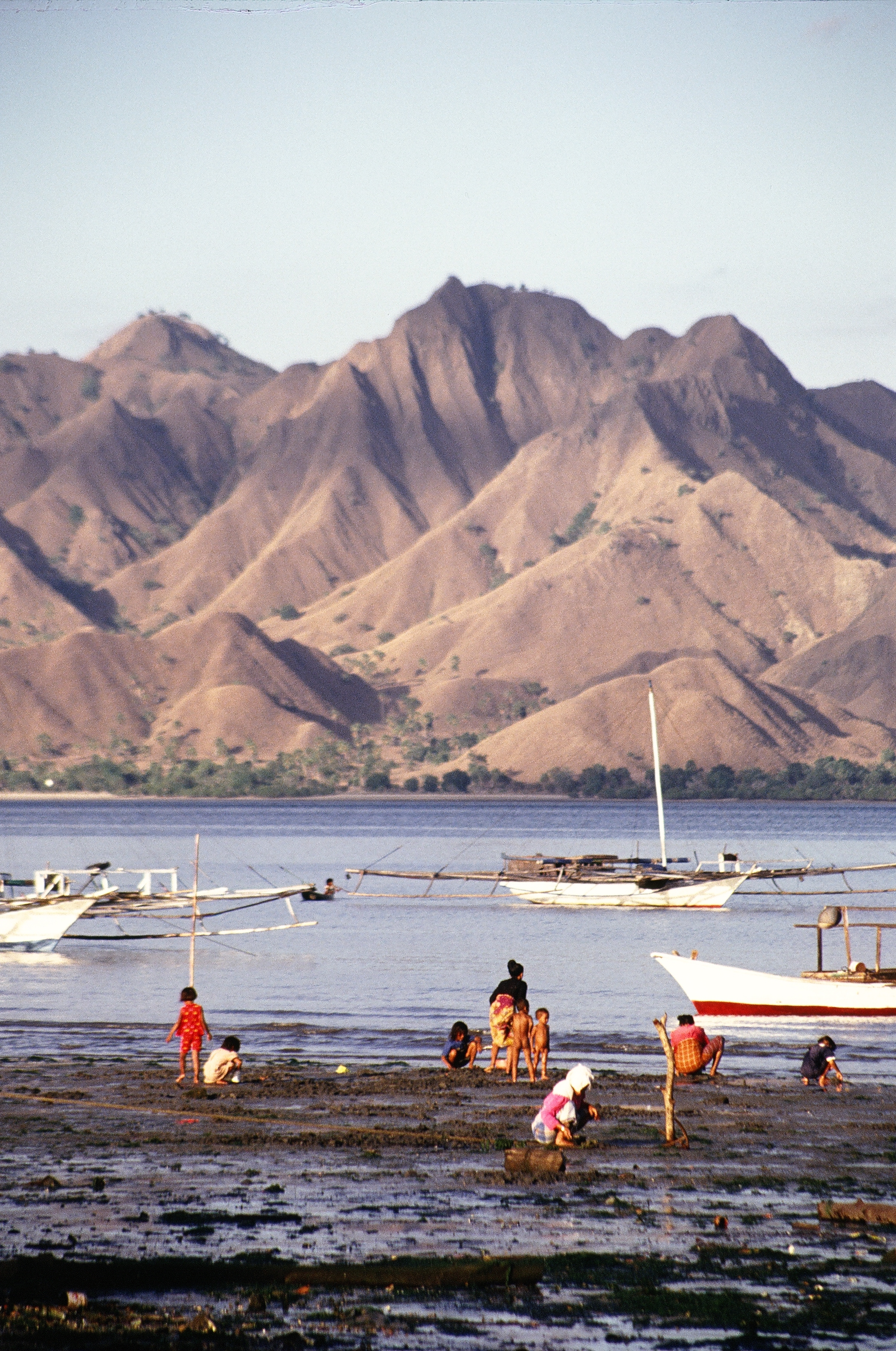
Komodo National Park

== Demographics ==
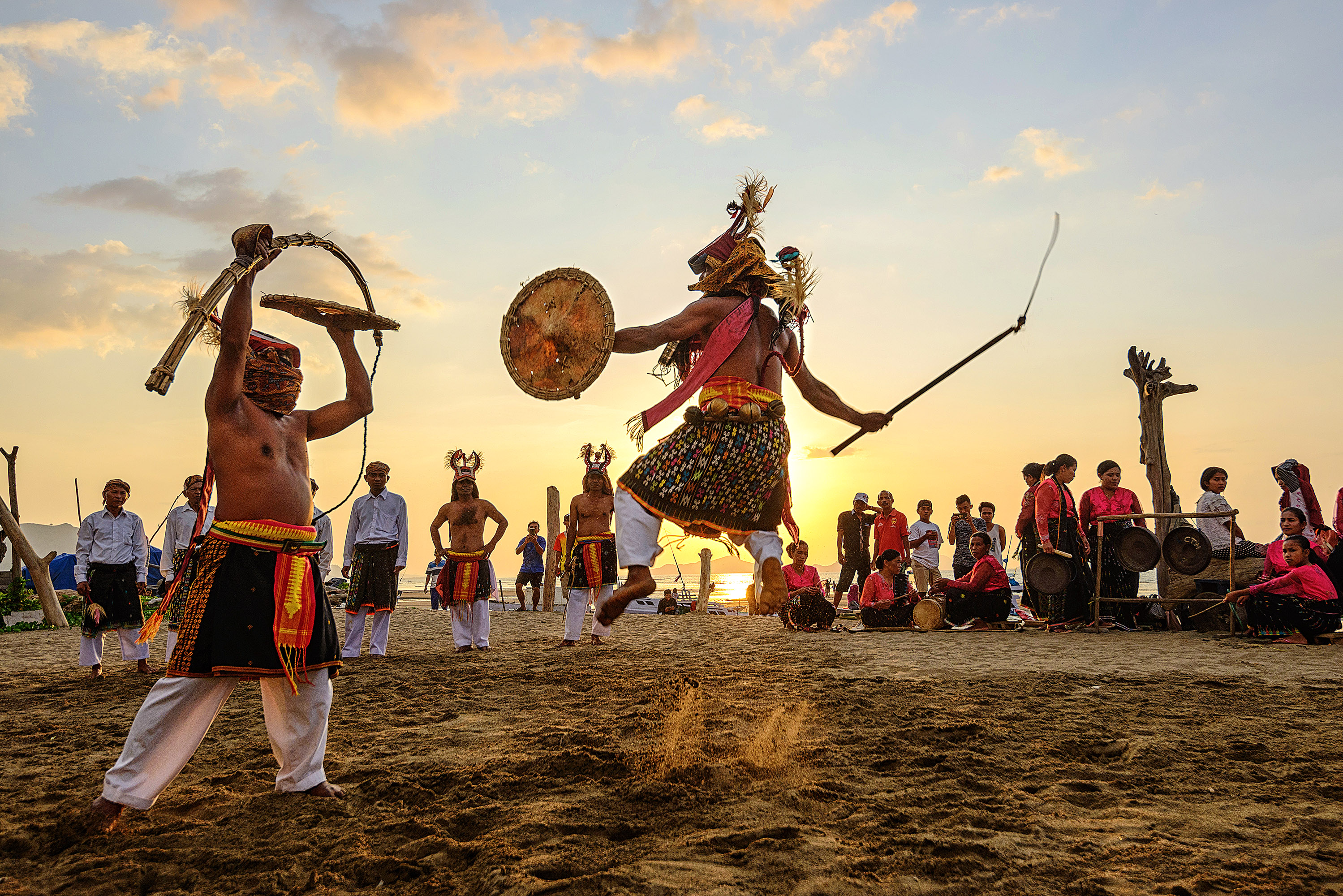
Caci Dance, a traditional dance of the Flores

=== Population ===
Historical population
Year	Pop.	±%
1971	2,295,287	—
1980	2,737,166	+19.3%
1990	3,268,644	+19.4%
1995	3,577,472	+9.4%
2000	3,952,279	+10.5%
2005	4,260,294	+7.8%
2010	4,683,827	+9.9%
2015	5,112,760	+9.2%
2020	5,325,566	+4.2%
2025	5,742,560	+7.8%
Source: Badan Pusat Statistik 2026 and previous

The census population of the province was 4,683,827 in 2010 and 5,325,566 in 2020,

Based on the latest data from the Central Statistics Agency (BPS), the population of East Nusa Tenggara Province had reached around 5.74 million people by mid 2025. Population growth in East Nusa Tenggara is at a fairly stable level, although variations in growth rates are seen in various districts and cities. Kupang City as the provincial capital is the urban area with the largest population, while the most populous regency is South Central Timor, followed by other large regencies such as Sikka and Manggarai on Flores, and Southwest Sumba.

The average population density in East Nusa Tenggara is around 110 people per km², but the population distribution is uneven. Urban areas such as Kupang City have a much higher density than rural areas spread across the outer islands, such as Alor, Rote, or Savu.

=== Ethnicity and religion ===
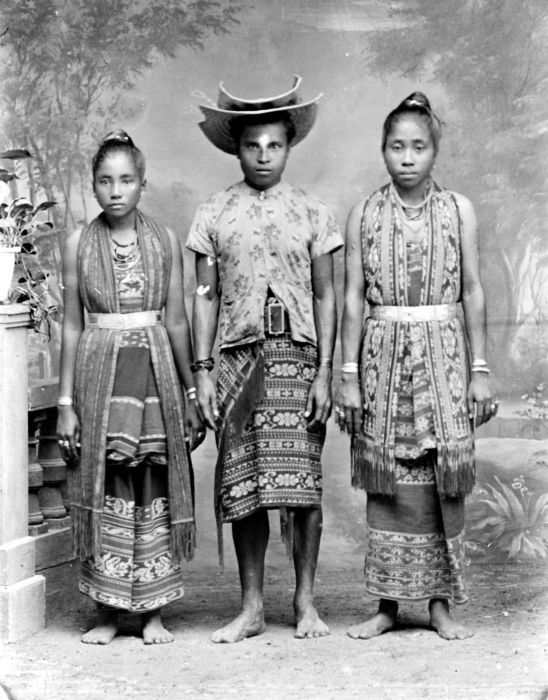
Men and women wearing traditional clothing of the Rotenese people.

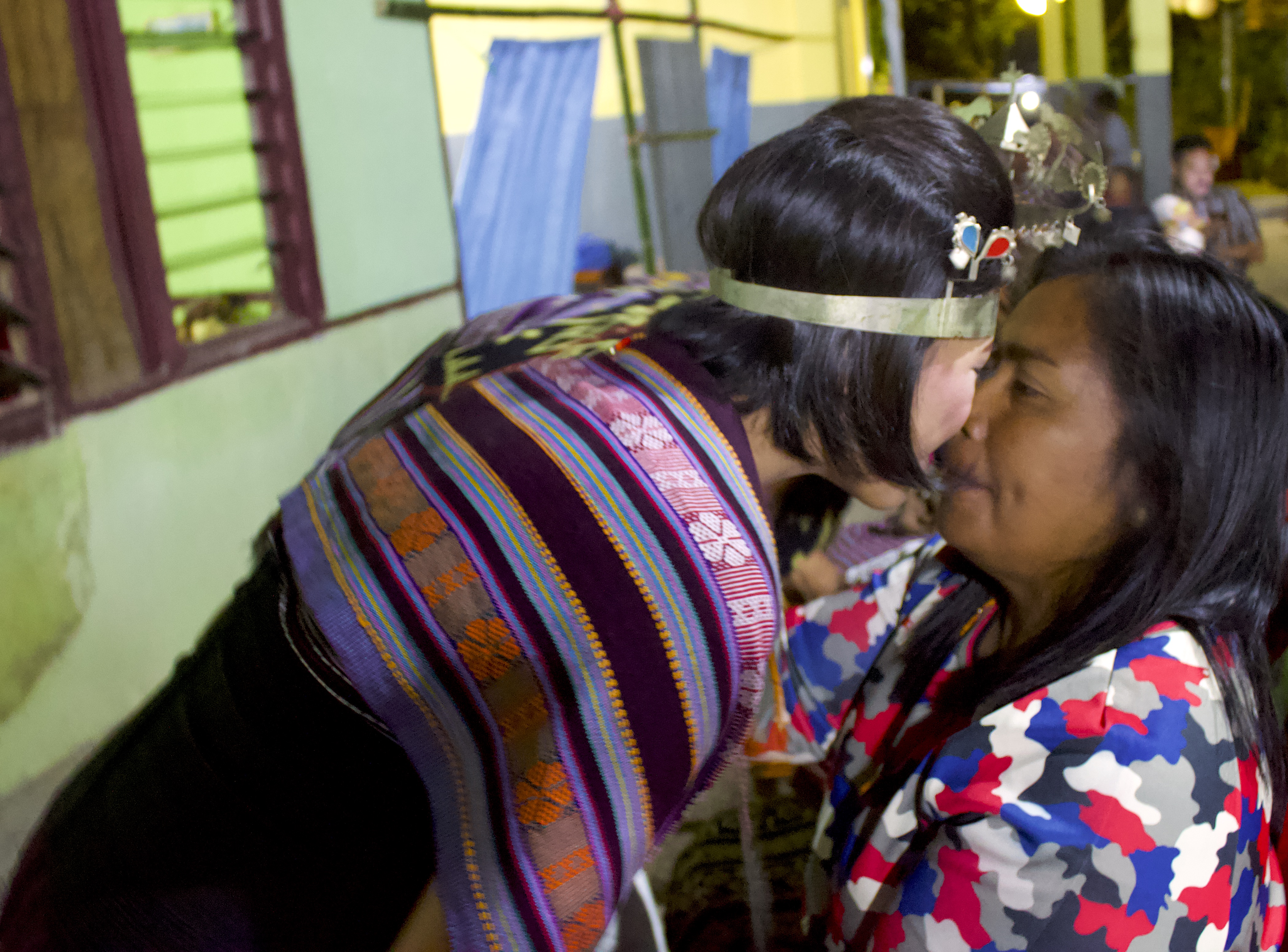
Henge’do, the nose-kissing tradition in Sabu Raijua, East Nusa Tenggara

Ethnicity in East Nusa Tenggara consists of several main groups, including the Flores, Sumba, Timor, Rote, Alor, and Sabu peoples, foreign ethnic groups such as the Chinese, Arabs, as well as Eurasians (primarily of Portuguese and Dutch ancestry) are also present in the province. Indonesian is used as the official language in administration and education, but regional languages are still used in daily life in many local communities.

Religion in East Nusa Tenggara (December 2023)
1. Roman Catholic (53.7%)
2. Protestantism (36.2%)
3. Islam (9.45%)
4. Marapu and others (0.56%)
5. Hinduism (0.10%)
6. Buddhism (0.01%)

East Nusa Tenggara Province is one of the provinces in Indonesia with a majority Christian population, both Catholic and Protestant. The influence of Christianity is very strong in East Nusa Tenggara, especially in the Flores and Sumba regions, which were influenced by the arrival of European missionaries, especially from Portugal and the Netherlands. In Flores, around 85% of the population is Catholic, making it one of the areas with the largest Catholic population in Indonesia.

East Nusa Tenggara also has a significant Muslim minority, specifically in Kupang City and certain regencies such as in coastal areas or on islands such as Alor and Timor. Hinduism as well as local beliefs are also practised by a minority, especially in Sumba and Timor.

== Government and administrative divisions ==
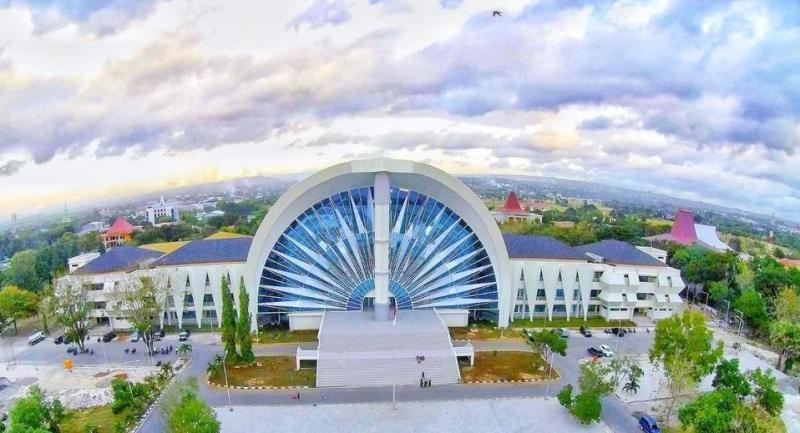
East Nusa Tenggara Governor's Office

The province is divided into twenty-one regencies and one independent city (Kupang). These are listed below with their areas and their populations at the 2010 Census and the 2020 Census, together with the official estimates as of mid-2025.

Kode Wilayah	Name of City or Regency	Statute (including year when established)	Area in km^{2}	Pop'n 2010 Census	Pop'n 2020 Census	Pop'n mid 2025 Estimate	Capital	HDI 2022 estimate
53.71	Kupang City		158.89	336,239	442,758	482,730	Kupang	0.8020 (Very High)
53.01	Kupang Regency	UU 69/1958	5,130.66	304,548	366,383	383,390	Oelamasi	0.6504 (Medium)
53.02	South Central Timor Regency (Timor Tengah Selatan)	UU 69/1958	3,931.75	441,155	455,410	488,000	Soe	0.6273 (Medium)
53.03	North Central Timor Regency (Timor Tengah Utara)	UU 69/1958	2,622.29	229,803	259,829	279,640	Kefamenanu	0.6426 (Medium)
53.04	Belu Regency	UU 69/1958	1,126.77	188,163	217,973	240,390	Atambua	0.6322 (Medium)
53.14	Rote Ndao Regency	UU 9/2002	1,277.26	119,908	143,764	155,370	Baa	0.6321 (Medium)
53.21	Malaka Regency	UU 3/2013	1,109.00	164,134	183,898	196,010	Betun	0.6134 (Medium)
	Southeastern (Timor) group		15,356.62	1,783,950	2,070,015	2,225,530		
53.05	Alor Regency ^{(a)} (Alor Archipelago)	UU 69/1958	2,918.75	190,026	211,872	228,500	Kalabahi	0.6226 (Medium)
53.13	Lembata Regency (Lomblen)	UU 52/1999	1,263.77	117,829	135,930	145,270	Lewoleba	0.6547 (Medium)
53.06	East Flores Regency (Flores Timur) ^{(b)}	UU 69/1958	1,741.06	232,605	276,896	296,760	Larantuka	0.6493 (Medium)
53.07	Sikka Regency	UU 69/1958	1,669.71	300,328	321,953	345,320	Maumere	0.6606 (Medium)
53.08	Ende Regency	UU 69/1958	2,084.08	260,605	270,763	284,170	Ende	0.6797 (Medium)
53.16	Nagekeo Regency	UU 2/2007	1,397.97	130,120	159,732	170,670	Mbay	0.6622 (Medium)
53.09	Ngada Regency	UU 69/1958	1,736.74	142,393	165,254	176,460	Bajawa	0.6826 (Medium)
53.19	East Manggarai Regency (Manggarai Timur)	UU 36/2007	2,389.50	252,744	275,603	301,530	Borong	0.623 (Medium)
53.10	Manggarai Regency (Manggarai Tengah)	UU 69/1958	1,343.34	292,451	312,855	340,150	Ruteng	0.6583 (Medium)
53.15	West Manggarai Regency ^{(c)} (Manggarai Barat)	UU 8/2003	3,120.03	221,703	256,317	281,690	Labuan Bajo	0.6492 (Medium)
	Northern (Flores) group		19,664.92	2,140,804	2,387,175	2,570,520		
53.11	East Sumba Regency (Sumba Timur)	UU 69/1958	7,000.50	227,732	244,820	262,975	Waingapu	0.6617 (Medium)
53.12	West Sumba Regency (Sumba Barat)	UU 69/1958	737.42	111,993	145,097	160,170	Waikabubak	0.6443 (Medium)
53.17	Central Sumba Regency (Sumba Tengah)	UU 3/2007	1,789.69	62,485	85,482	94,187	Waibakul	0.6271 (Medium)
53.18	Southwest Sumba Regency (Sumba Barat Daya)	UU 16/2007	1,381.94	284,903	303,650	335,500	Tambolaka	0.6315 (Medium)
53.20	Sabu Raijua Regency	UU 52/2008	459.58	72,960	89,327	96,259	West Savu	0.5790 (Low)
	Southwestern (Sumba) group		11,369.13	760,073	869,376	949,091		

Notes: (a) includes Alor and Pantar islands. (b) East Flores Regency includes Adonara and Solor islands as well as the eastern part of Flores Island.
(c) West Manggarai Regency includes Komodo and Rinca islands off the west coast of Flores.

The province has two of Indonesia's 84 national electoral districts to elect members to the People's Representative Council. The East Nusa Tenggara I Electoral District consists of the ten regencies in the Northern (Flores) group, and elects six members to the People's Representative Council. The East Nusa Tenggara II Electoral District consists of the six regencies in the Southeastern (Timor) group and the five regencies in the Southwestern (Sumba) group, together with the city of Kupang, and elects seven members to the People's Representative Council.

=== List of provincial governors ===
Below is a list of governors who have held office in the East Nusa Tenggara.

- W. J. Lala Mentik (1960–1965)
- El Tari (1966–1978)
- Ben Mboi (1978–1988)
- Hendrik Fernandez (1988–1993)
- Herman Musakabe (1993–1998)
- Piet Alexander Tallo (1998–2008)
- Frans Lebu Raya (2008–2018)
- Victor Laiskodat (2018-2023)
- Melki Laka Lena (2025–present)

== Economy ==
The economy of East Nusa Tenggara Province is dominated by the agriculture, fisheries, and tourism sectors. Most of the East Nusa Tenggara population works in the agricultural sector, with main crops such as corn, rice, cassava, beans, and coconuts. The livestock sector also plays an important role, especially in areas such as Sumba and Timor, where many residents raise cattle, horses, and pigs.

In addition, the fisheries sector is one of the main sources of livelihood for people in coastal areas and small islands. Fish, seaweed, and other marine products are important commodities developed by local communities.

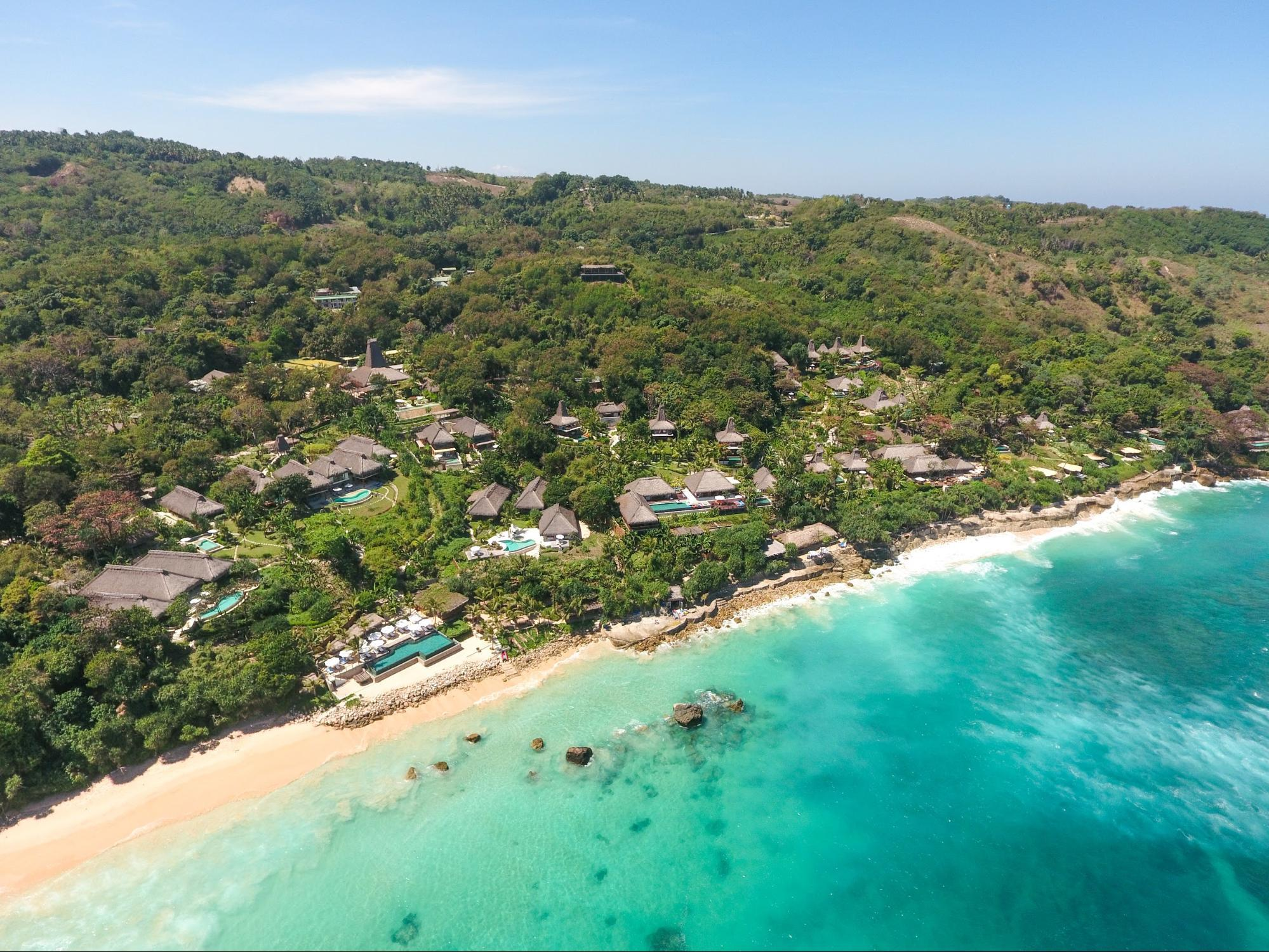
A resort along Nihiwatu Beach

On the other hand, the tourism sector in East Nusa Tenggara has experienced rapid development in recent years, especially with the increasing popularity of tourist destinations such as Labuan Bajo and Komodo National Park which attract tourists from within and outside the country. The area's natural environment, including its exotic beaches, volcanoes and underwater biodiversity, are the main attractions for tourists.

=== Economic activity ===
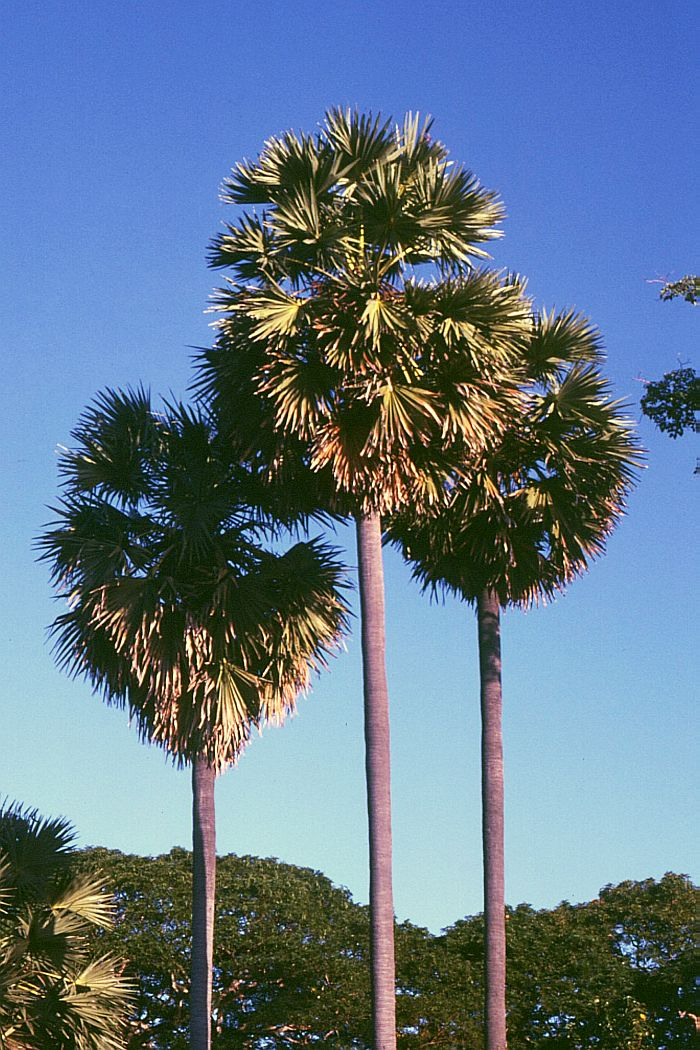
The Lontar palm has high significance in local agriculture

East Nusa Tenggara Province has a diverse economy with agriculture, fisheries, forestry, and cultivation as its main pillars. Subsistence farming dominates economic activity, with corn and smallholder plantation crops such as coffee being the main products. Local plants such as the lontar palm (Borassus flabellifer) and the sugar palm (Arenga pinnata) also play an important role in the local economy.

On Sumba Island, palm trees play a major role in providing wood, roofing materials, and producing food in the form of fruits and palm sugar obtained from tapping the fruit stems. In other areas such as West Manggarai, palm trees are also a source of raw materials and processed products that are useful for local communities. Products from palm and palm trees can even be processed into alcoholic beverages through traditional fermentation, which is part of the local economy.

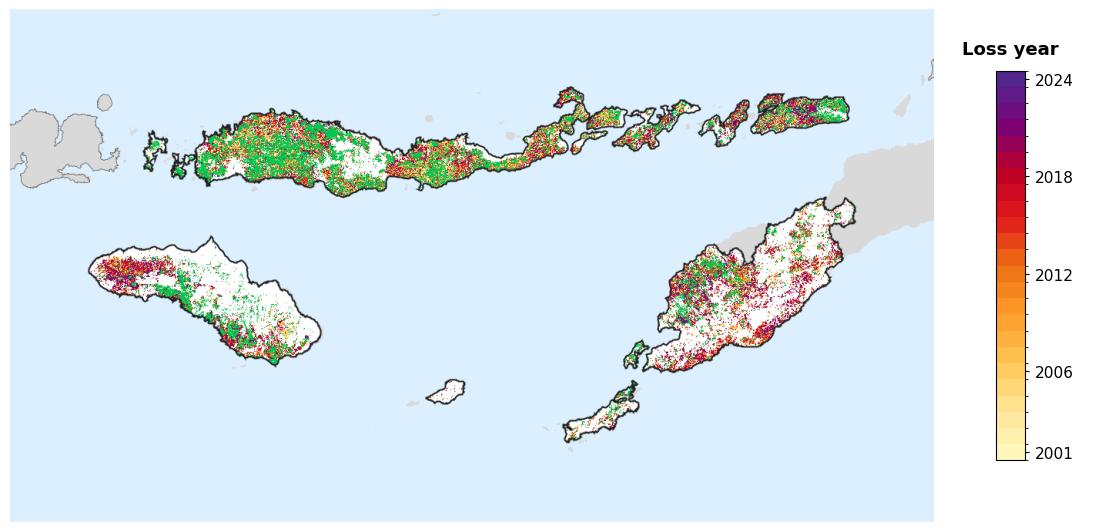
Tree-cover loss year in East Nusa Tenggara, 2001-2024, from the Global Forest Change dataset.

In addition, the forestry sector also plays an important role in supporting the provincial economy. Forests in East Nusa Tenggara provide important resources such as firewood, building materials, and other non-timber products used by local communities. Forestry managed with sustainable principles not only contributes to the economy, but also helps maintain ecosystems and environmental balance, which is very important for communities that depend on natural resources.

Seaweed farming is one of the fastest growing economic sectors in coastal and island areas. In the Alor Islands, for example, informal village-based seaweed farming has become an important source of additional income for the community. Much of this seaweed is exported in its raw form to countries such as Japan, indicating greater economic potential in this sector.

Fisheries are also a mainstay sector for coastal communities. Marine products such as fish, shrimp, and various other marine products are not only a source of food for local communities but also have great potential as export products. This fisheries activity makes a significant contribution to the local economy.

Overall, the economy of East Nusa Tenggara is highly dependent on the use of natural resources traditionally managed by local communities. With agriculture, fisheries, forestry, and seaweed farming as the backbone of the economy, the province continues to develop its potential while preserving the environment and local cultural richness. Through sustainable management of natural resources, East Nusa Tenggara seeks to improve the welfare of its people and strengthen its contribution to the national economy.

==== Poverty and poverty alleviation in East Nusa Tenggara (NTT) ====
NTT is known as one of the poorest provinces in Indonesia, with various factors causing chronic poverty in this region. The arid geographical conditions and remote island geography limit access to basic resources and services. Agriculture, which is the main livelihood, is often hampered by infertile soil and prolonged drought, resulting in low agricultural productivity. In addition, limited infrastructure worsens people's access to education, health, and markets.

The low level of education in NTT is also one of the main causes of poverty. Limited access to education, especially in rural areas, means that many children cannot continue their education, thus hampering their ability to get better jobs. This is exacerbated by poor health conditions, where many residents cannot access basic health services due to the lack of medical facilities, health workers, and remote access.

The government and various organizations have made a number of efforts to alleviate poverty in NTT. Some of these include the development of infrastructure such as roads, bridges, and health facilities, which aim to open access and improve connectivity throughout the region. Programs to improve the quality of education such as building schools and sending teachers to remote areas are also being implemented to increase school participation rates.

Efforts to empower the community's economy include skills training and access to micro-credit to encourage small and medium enterprises. The tourism sector, which has great potential in NTT, has also begun to be developed as an alternative source of income. In addition, the government has launched social assistance programs such as the Family Hope Program (PKH) and Non-Cash Food Assistance (BPNT) to support poor families in meeting their basic needs.

Although various programs have been implemented, challenges still exist. Corruption, slow bureaucracy, and lack of community involvement in development often hinder the effectiveness of programs. In addition, the impact of climate change on agriculture adds to the complexity of the problem. However, with a sustainable approach and active community participation, there is hope that poverty in NTT can be reduced significantly, bringing prosperity to its residents.

== Infrastructure ==
Although infrastructure development in East Nusa Tenggara continues to grow, the province still faces challenges in terms of inter-island connectivity. Land, sea, and air transportation continue to be improved to connect remote areas, but some areas are still difficult to reach, especially during the rainy season when road conditions become less good. On the other hand, the construction of roads, bridges, ports, and airports has been carried out in stages to improve mobility and accessibility, as well as support economic and tourism development in the province.

=== Transport ===
Airports that serves the province are:

- El Tari Airport (serving Kupang)
- Komodo International Airport (serving Labuan Bajo)
- A. A. Bere Tallo Airport (serving Atambua)
- H. Hasan Aroeboesman Airport (serving Ende)
- Gewayantana Airport (serving Larantuka)
- Umbu Mehang Kunda Airport (serving Waingapu)
- Tardamu Airport (serving Savu Island)

The Port of Labuan Bajo also serves the province.

=== Education ===
Accessibility to education is difficult, especially in remote areas and islands, where many schools lack basic facilities such as proper buildings, laboratories, and libraries. The quality of teaching also needs to be improved due to the uneven distribution of teachers and the lack of qualified teaching staff in rural areas. Efforts to improve this sector continue to be carried out through government programs such as scholarships and the construction of new schools, although infrastructure and teaching staff challenges remain major issues.

=== Health ===
The health sector in East Nusa Tenggara sees major challenges in terms of access to and quality of health services. Many remote areas are difficult to reach, and health facilities are often inadequate with limited equipment and medicines. The shortage of medical personnel, especially in rural areas, further exacerbates this situation. Major health problems in NTT (East Nusa Tenggara) include malnutrition, high maternal and infant mortality rates, and infectious diseases such as malaria and tuberculosis. Efforts to improve the situation are being made through the construction of new health facilities, national health programs, and interventions from non-governmental organizations, although geographic and logistical challenges remain major obstacles.

== Tourism ==
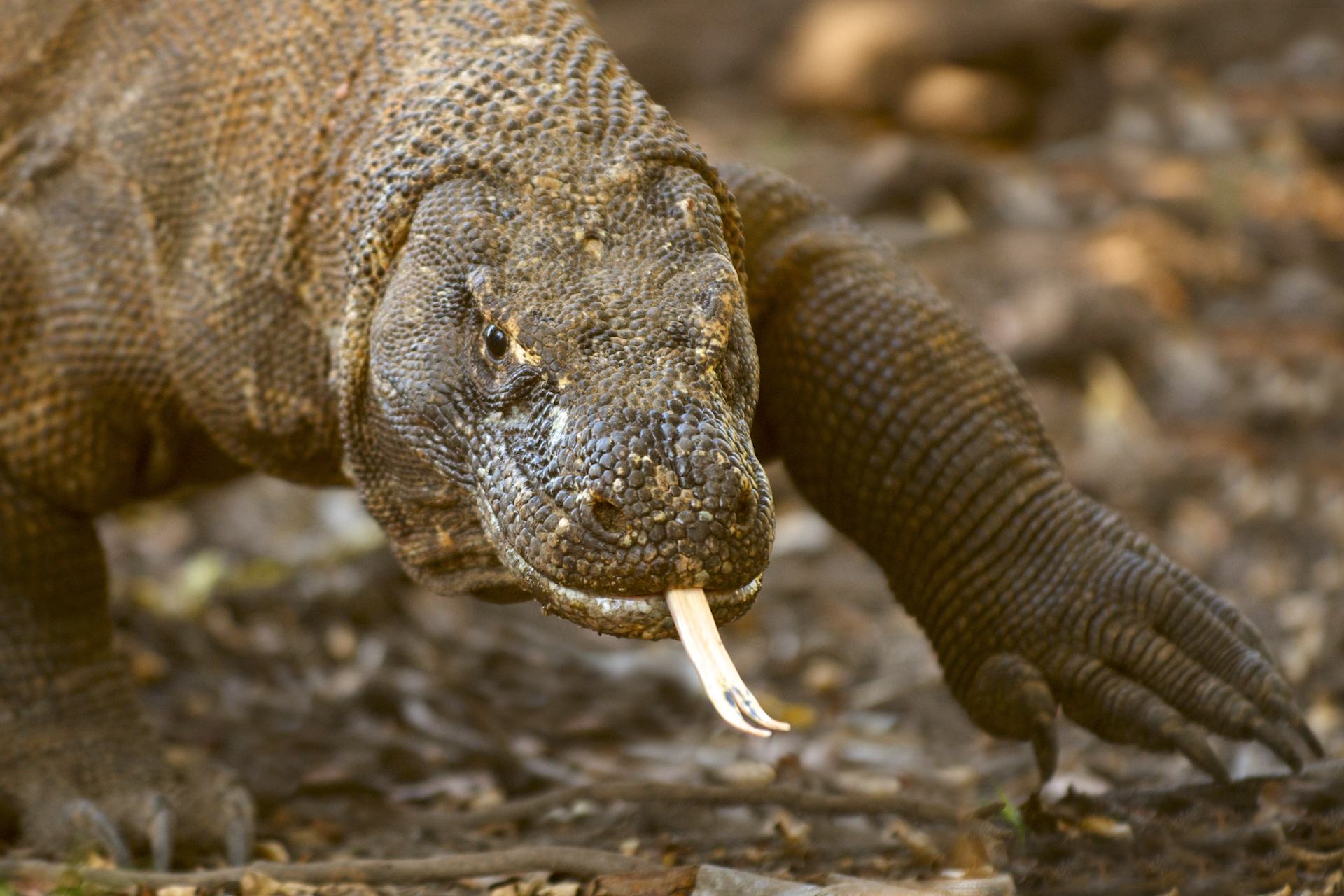
Komodo dragon, a large species of lizard, lives in this province

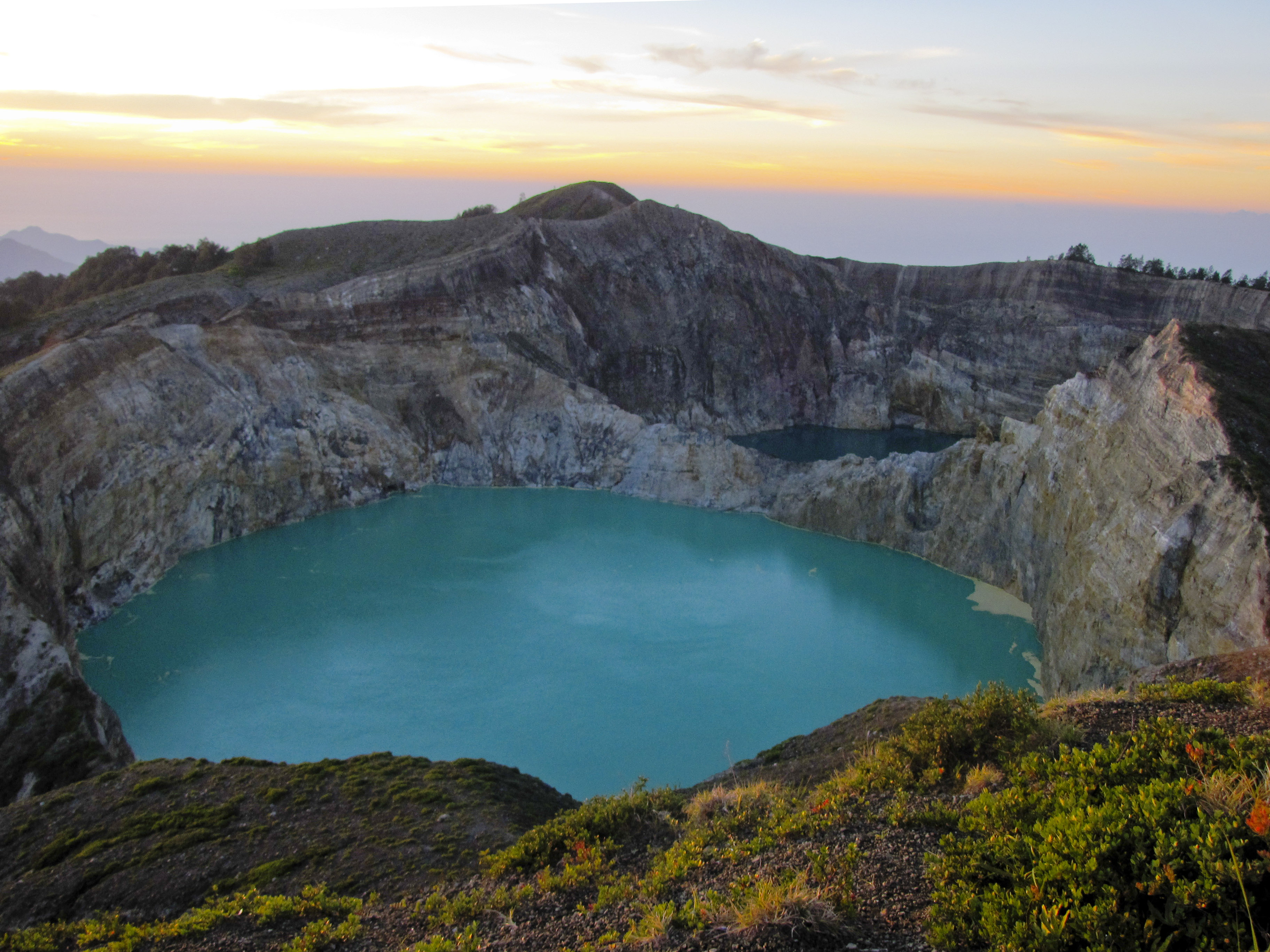
One of the crater lakes of Kelimutu

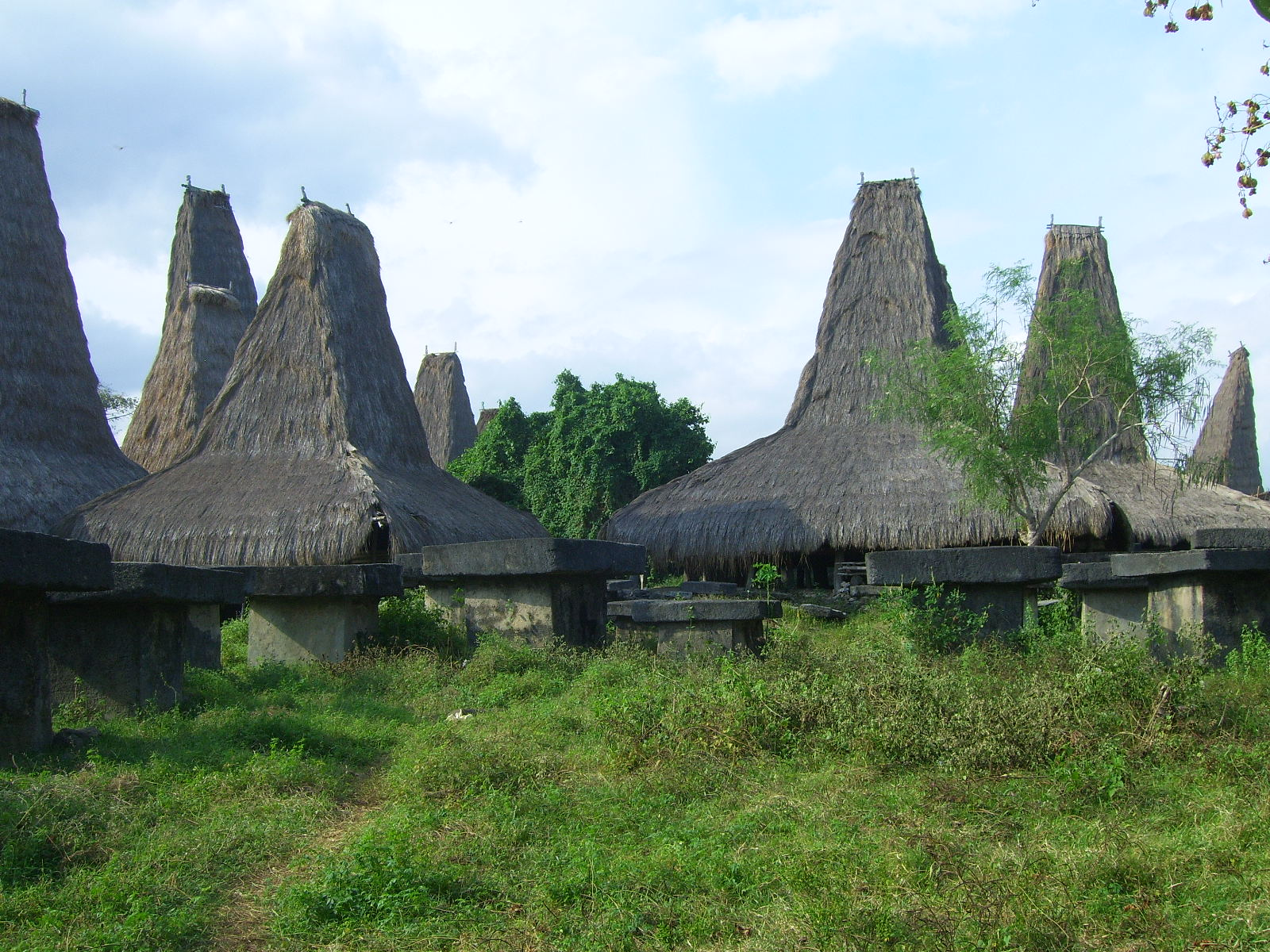
Traditional Sumbanese houses in West Sumba

East Nusa Tenggara is a province rich in diverse tourist attractions, and the provincial government is actively working to promote tourism. Tourist hotspots include:

- Komodo National Park
- Kelimutu National Park on Flores, featuring three crater lakes of varying colors
- Mount Mutis, east of Kupang, known as the highest point of the province
- Semana Santa in Larantuka, a religious tradition celebrated annually
- Sumba Island, known for traditional housing and the Pasola festival
- Alor Island, a renowned diving destination with rich marine biodiversity
- 17 islands National Park on Riung Island, known for its natural environment and remoteness.

== Notable figures ==
Well-known figures from the province include the following:

- Izaak Huru Doko, an independence fighter who organised resistance against the Dutch NICA (Netherlands-Indies Civil Administration) in the 1940s
- Herman Johannes, scientist, government minister, and Rector of Gadjah Mada University (1961–1966)
- Wilhelmus Zakaria Johannes, regarded as the first Indonesian radiologist in Indonesia. The W.Z Johannes hospital in Kupang is named after him.
- Ben Mboi, former East Nusa Tenggara governor
- Adrianus Mooy, an economist who was governor of Bank Indonesia (1988–1993) and executive director of ESCAP
- Karina Nadila Niab, an actress, TV host and beauty queen, Puteri Indonesia Pariwisata 2017, represented Indonesia in Miss Supranational 2017.
- Johnny Gerard Plate, a politician and former 6th Minister of Communications and Informatics
- Frans Seda, a politician and finance minister (1966–1968) of Indonesia
- Edward Tannur, member of the House of Representatives of Indonesia representing East Nusa Tenggara II electoral district from Atambua.

== See also ==
- List of rivers of East Nusa Tenggara
