= Begunkodor railway station =

Railway station

BEGUNKODAR

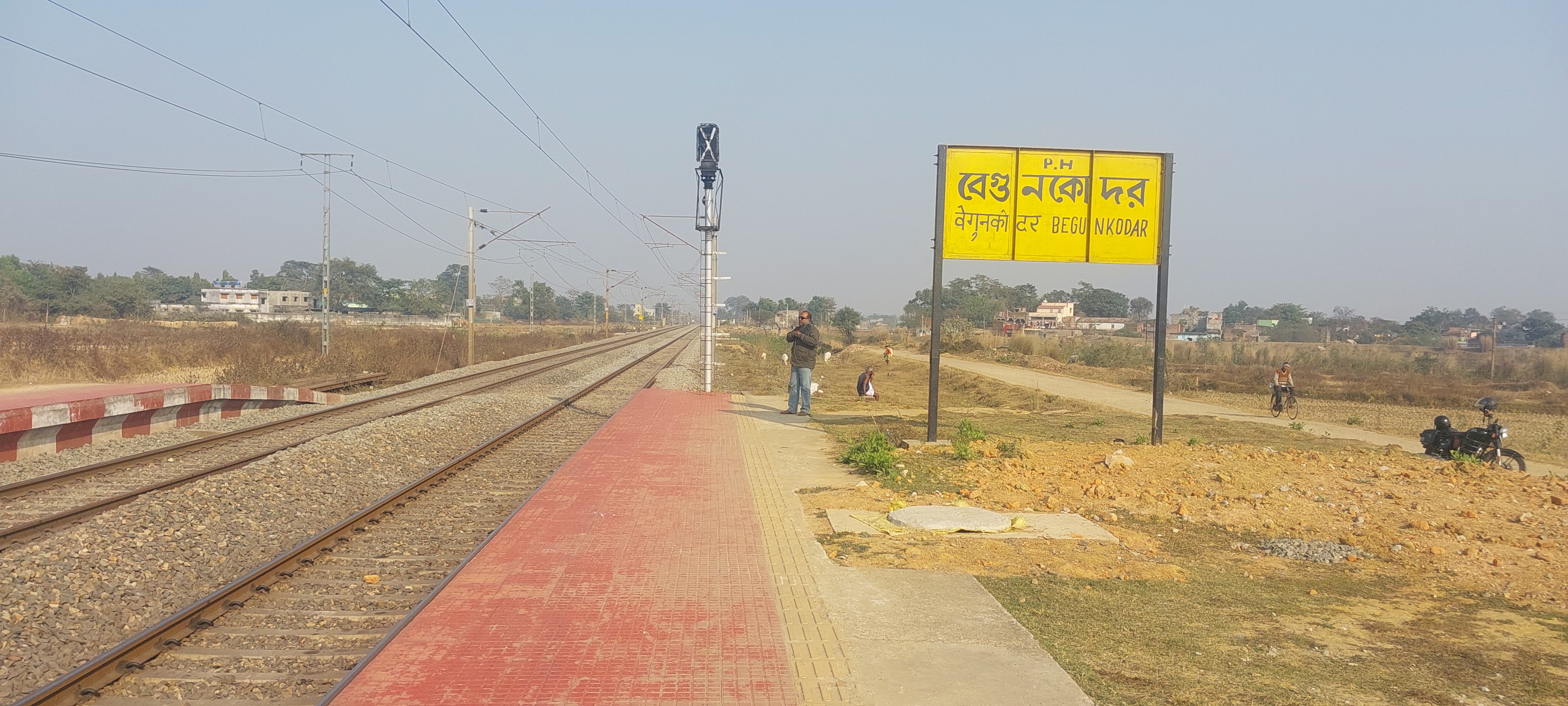
- Begunkodar Railway Station

General information
- Location: Begunkodor, Purulia district, West Bengal; India
- Coordinates: 23.3875°N 86.0217°E
- Elevation: 308 metres (1,010 ft)
- System: Indian Railways station
- Line: Double electrified BG
- Platforms: 2
- Tracks: 2

Construction
- Parking: Not available

Other information
- Status: Functional
- Station code: BKDR
- Zone(s): South Eastern Railway
- Division(s): Ranchi Division

History
- Opened: 1960
- Closed: 1967
- Rebuilt: 2009

Services
Preceding station	Indian Railways	Following station
Kotshila Junction towards Purulia Junction	South Eastern Railway zone Purulia–Muri line	Jhalda towards Muri Junction
Location
- Location within West Bengal Location within India
- Interactive map

Begunkodar railway station is a railway station of Ranchi railway division of the South Eastern Railway zone of the Indian Railways. It serves the nearby area of Begunkodor and Jhalda town in the Purulia district in the Indian state of West Bengal. Passengers deserted the station and it had come to be known as haunted in Railway records. The station was listed by Railways as one of its 10 most haunted stations in India.

== History ==
Begunkodor station was set up by the joint efforts of the queen of Santals, Lachan Kumari and Indian Railways in the year 1960.

== Controversy ==
According to the villagers of Begunkodor, in 1967 a railway employee reported the sighting of a woman ghost, and it was rumored that she had died in a railway accident. The next day he told people about it but they ignored him.

The real trouble started when the dead bodies of the station master and his wife were found in their quarters. The station was subsequently closed as trains stopped making halts here due to alleged paranormal phenomena.

In the late 1990s the villagers formed a committee and asked the officials to reopen the railway station. In 2007 local villagers wrote to then Railway minister Smt. Mamata Banerjee and CPIM leader Basudeb Acharia, who belongs to Purulia and was member of the parliamentary standing committee on Railways at the time. the begunkodar haunted tag remains. Acharia said that railway employees had made up the story to avoid being posted there. After 42 years, in August 2009, the railway station was finally reopened as a passenger train halt, by former Railway minister Mamata Banerjee.

Although 10 trains halt here regularly, passengers avoid using the station after sunset. It is believed that twice a week, a girl is seen running at with the train on the same day when she died. Presently, Begunkodar railway station is being touted by certain people as a ghost tourist spot to attract visitors.

== In Literature ==
A seemingly accurate first-hand account of the events that took place at the station in 1967 is found in a historical fiction story published in 2022
