= Levuka language =

Austronesian language spoken in Indonesia

Levuka
- Native to: Indonesia
- Region: Lembata
- Native speakers: 4,000 (2008 census)
- Language family: Austronesian: Malayo-Polynesian; Central–Eastern; Flores–Lembata; Lamaholot; Levuka–South Lembata; Levuka

Language codes
- ISO 639-3: lvu
- Glottolog: levu1239

Levuka is a Central Malayo-Polynesian language of the island of Lembata, east of Flores in Indonesia.
