= Lamalera language =

Language spoken in Indonesia

Lamalera
- Native to: Indonesia
- Region: Lembata
- Ethnicity: Lamalera
- Native speakers: 4,000 (2008 census)
- Language family: Austronesian: Malayo-Polynesian; Central–Eastern; Flores–Lembata; Lamaholot; Alorese–Lamalera; Lamalera

Language codes
- ISO 639-3: lmr
- Glottolog: lama1278

Lamalera is a Central Malayo-Polynesian language of the island of Lembata, east of Flores in Indonesia.
