= Lewotobi language =

Language spoken in Indonesia

Lewotobi
- Lewotobi Lamaholot
- Native to: Indonesia
- Region: Flores
- Native speakers: (undated figure of 6,000)
- Language family: Austronesian: Malayo-Polynesian; Central–Eastern; Flores–Lembata; Lamaholot; Lewotobi

Language codes
- ISO 639-3: lwt
- Glottolog: lewo1244

Lewotobi is either a separate Central Malayo-Polynesian language or dialect of Lamaholot of Flores island in Indonesia. It is presented as a separate language by Ethnologue and Grimes (1997). Nagaya (2011), in his description of Lewotobi, disputes this, classifying it instead as a dialect of Lamaholot.
