= Begunkodor =

Begunkodar
- Census Town (CT)
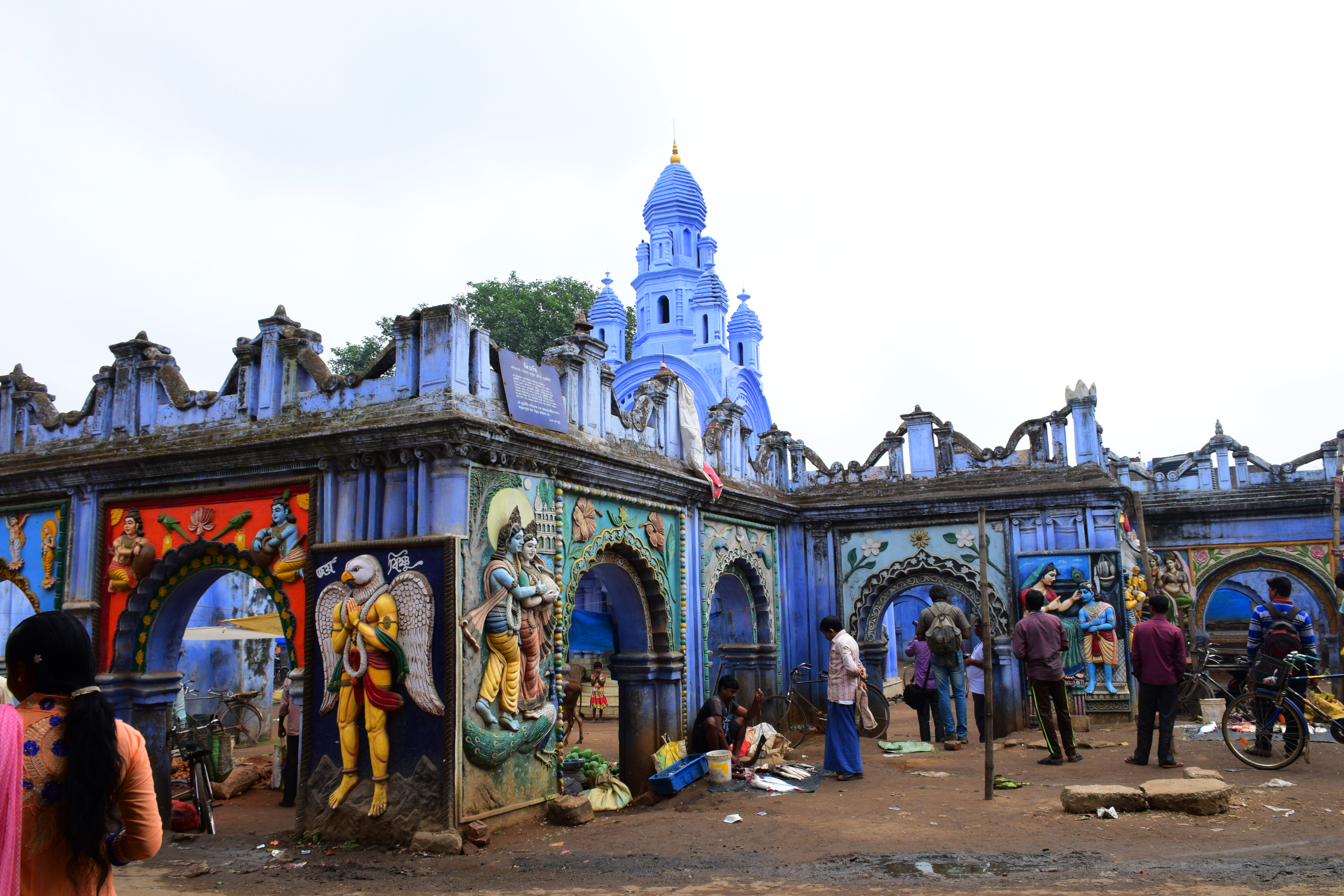
- RasMancha at Begunkodor in Purulia district

- Location in West Bengal, India Begunkodar (India)
- Coordinates: 23.3528°N 86.0566°E
- State: West Bengal
- Purulia: Jhalda

Government
  - Type: Local Body
  - Body: Gram panchayat

Area
  - Total: 3 km^{2} (1.2 sq mi)

Population (2011 census)
  - Total: 6,347
  - Density: 1,965/km^{2} (5,090/sq mi)

Languages
  - Official: Bengali, English, Hindi
- Time zone: UTC+5:30 (IST)
- Postal code: 723202
- Places in Jhalda subdivision in Purulia district. Key: M: municipality, C: census town, R: rural/ urban centre, H: historical/ religious centre, X: craft centre, T: tourist centre, △: hills Owing to space constraints in the small map, the locations in the larger map on click through may vary slightly.

Begunkodor is a census town in the Jhalda II CD block in the Jhalda subdivision of the Purulia district of West Bengal near its border with Jharkhand, situated 46 km (29 mi) away from district town Purulia. Jhalda is the sub division headquarter of the census town which is 8 km (5.0 mi) away.

== Geography ==
Begunkodor is located at 23.3528°N 86.0566°E.

=== Area overview ===
Purulia district forms the lowest step of the Chota Nagpur Plateau. The general scenario is undulating land with scattered hills. Jhalda subdivision, shown in the map alongside, is located in the western part of the district, bordering Jharkhand. The Subarnarekha flows along a short stretch of its western border. It is an overwhelmingly rural subdivision with 91.02% of the population living in the rural areas and 8.98% living in the urban areas. There are 3 census towns in the subdivision. The map alongside shows some of the tourist attractions in the Ajodhya Hills. The area is home to Purulia Chhau dance with spectacular masks made at Charida. The remnants of old temples and deities are found in the subdivision also, as in other parts of the district.

=== Weather ===
The yearly average rainfall of the town is 150 mm (5.9 in). Maximum temperature here reaches up to 40 °C (104 °F) in summer where as it falls up to 5 °C (41 °F) in winter.

== Demographics ==
The Begunkodor census town had a population of 6347 of which 3242 are males while 3105 are females as per the report released by census India in 2011. Female sex ratio is of 958 against state average of 950. In Begunkodor, male literacy rate is around 66.21% while female literary rate is 44.99%.

=== Religion ===
Hindus constitute 98% of the total population and are the largest religious community in the census town followed by Muslims who constitute 2% of the total population.

== Infrastructure ==
According to the District Census Handbook 2011, Puruliya, Begunkodor covered an area of 3.2276 km^{2} (1.2462 sq mi). There is a railway station at Jhalda 8 km (5.0 mi) away. Among the civic amenities, it had 3 km (1.9 mi) roads with both open and covered drains, the protected water supply involved overhead tank, uncovered well, hand pump. It had 950 domestic electric connections and 44 road light points. Among the medical facilities it had three dispensaries/ health centres, and 8 medicine shops. Among the educational facilities it had were nine primary schools, one middle school, one secondary school, one senior secondary school, the nearest degree college being at Jhalda. It had two old age homes. Among the social, recreational and cultural facilities it had an auditorium/ community hall, and one public library. Three important commodities it produced were vegetables, paddy and mustard. It has branches of one nationalised bank, one private commercial bank, 1one cooperative bank, one agricultural credit society and two non-agricultural credit society.

== Tourism ==
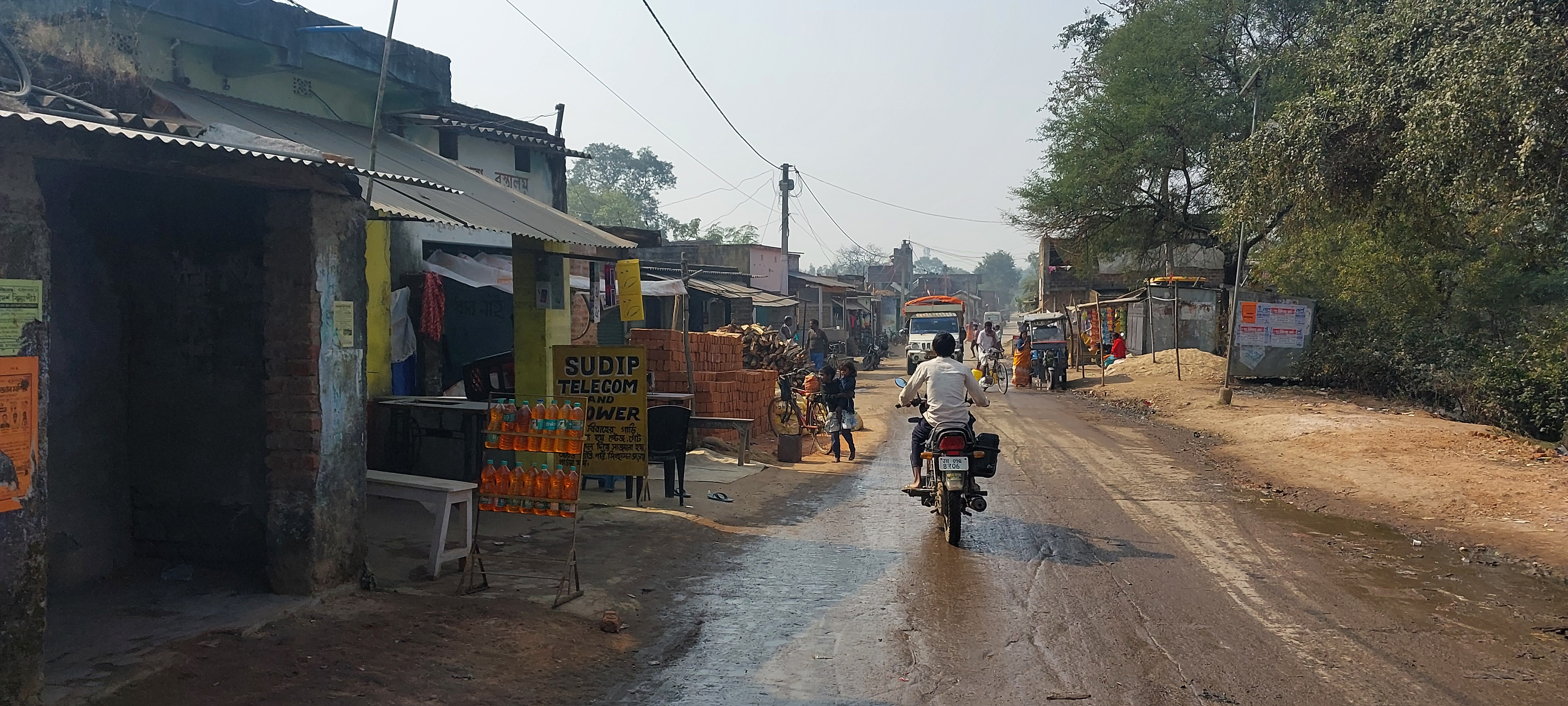
Begunkodar bazar

Begunkodor has its own scenic beauty around it. Situated at the river bank of Saharjore river it is surrounded by Ayodhya hill range and is only 3.5 km (2.2 mi) away from Murguma Dam, which itself is a popular picnic destination and place to view sunsets. The historic Thakurbari and Rashmela in Begunkodor is preserved by the archeological department of West Bengal and visited by thousands of tourists every year. The haunted railway station of Begunkodar is also popular as a "ghost station".

== Transportation ==
Begunkodor is well connected with the District Town Purulia and subdivision town Jhalda through roads. Around 30 buses regularly run between Begunkodor to Purulia and vice versa. The nearest railway station is Begunkodor railway station and nearest town Jhalda, which is 8 km (5.0 mi) away, with good connections through buses and autos. Regular night bus service is also available between Begunkodor to Kolkata, which is 350 km (220 mi) away from the town.

== Railway Station ==
=== History ===
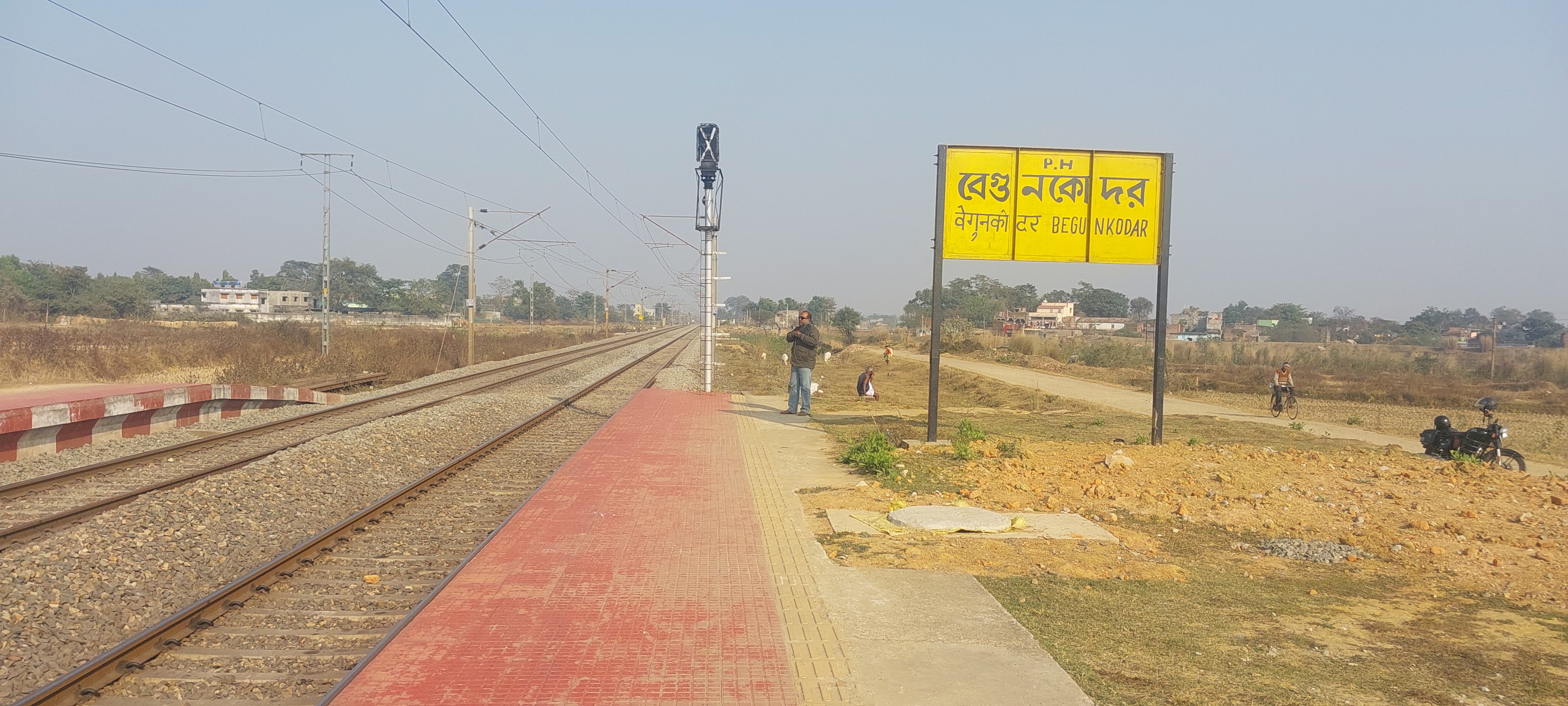
Begunkodar Railway Station

Begunkodor obtained its station due to the joint efforts of the queen of the Santals (the original inhabitants of the villages nearby) and Indian Railways in 1960.

=== The story of the railway station ===
However, the ill-fated station ran into unforeseen troubles just 7 years later. According to the villagers, in 1967, a railway employee reported the sighting of a woman's ghost, and it was rumoured that she had died in a railway accident. The next day he told people about it and they ignored him. The real trouble started when the dead bodies of the station master and his family were found in their quarters. The station was subsequently closed as trains stopped making halts there.

West Bengal's 'haunted' Begun kodar railway station story is documented in a newspaper article. A seemingly accurate first-hand account of the events that took place at the station in 1967 can be found in a historical fiction story published in 2022

=== Reopening in 2009 ===
Basudeb Acharia said that railway employees had made up the story to avoid being posted there. In the late 1990s the villagers formed a committee and asked the officials to reopen the station. About a decade later, in August 2009, the railway station was finally reopened as a passenger train halt, by former Railway minister Mamata Banerjee. However, regularly 10 trains halt here, with the last train being on 10.30pm. However, passengers still avoid using the station after sunset. Many ghost hunters have visited the station repeatedly confirming that there is no presence of ghosts.

In December 2017, a group of nine rationalists spent a night at the station, and found no evidence of any ghosts or spirits.
