= Menipo =

Island in Indonesia

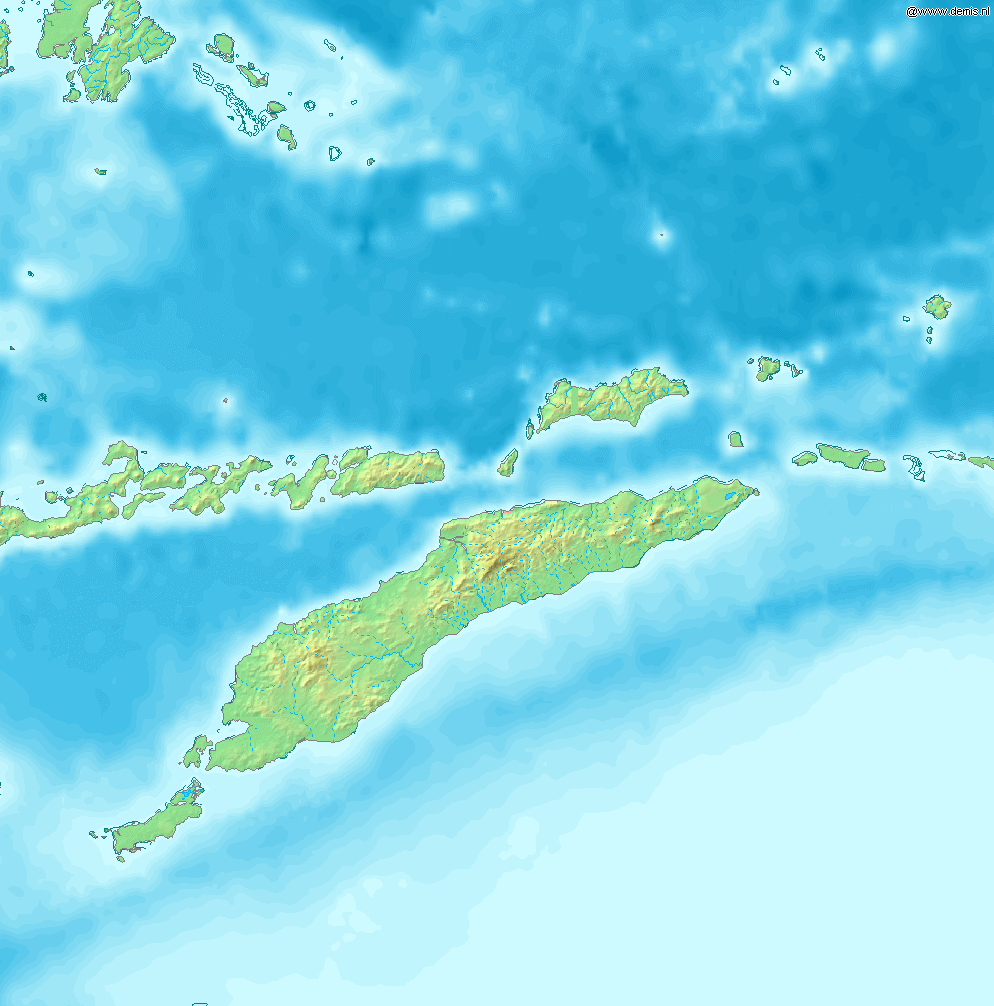
- Menipo near Timor Island

Geography
- Location: Timor Sea
- Coordinates: 10°9′9.61″S 124°9′20.92″E
- Archipelago: Lesser Sunda Islands

Administration
- Indonesia
- Province: East Nusa Tenggara
- Regency: Kupang Regency
- District: Amarasi Timur

Menipo is an island in the Lesser Sunda Islands in Indonesia, separated from Timor Island by a narrow strait. It is 7,328 metres (24,042 ft) long and 700 metres (2,300 ft) wide, officially a part of the Enoraen Village in Kupang. It is home to a variety of wildlife, including Timor deer, wild pigs, turtles and crocodiles. Humans use it for fishing, snorkeling, swimming and surfing.
