= Ile Ape language =

Language in Nusa Tenggara

Ile Ape
- Native to: Indonesia
- Region: Lembata
- Native speakers: 15,000 (2008 census)
- Language family: Austronesian: Malayo-Polynesian; Central–Eastern; Flores–Lembata; Lamaholot; Adonara–Ile Ape; Ile Ape

Language codes
- ISO 639-3: ila
- Glottolog: ilea1237

Ile Ape is a Central Malayo-Polynesian language of the island of Lembata, east of Flores in Indonesia.
