= Ben Mboi =

Indonesian politician

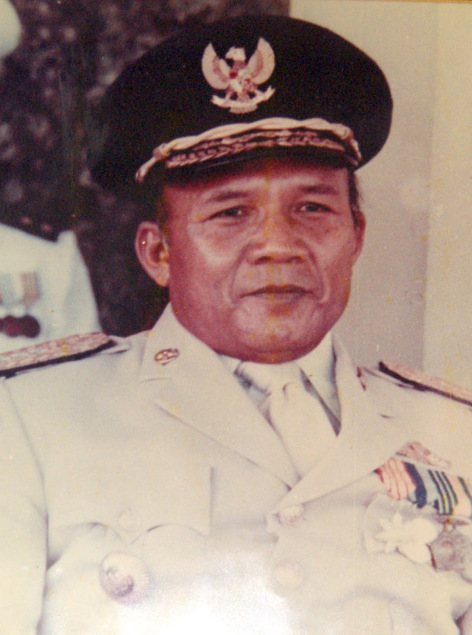

Governor of East Nusa Tenggara
- In office 1978–1988
- President: Suharto
- Preceded by: El Tari
- Succeeded by: Hendrik Fernandez

Personal details
- Born: Aloysius Benedictus Mboi; 22 May 1935 Ruteng, Flores, Dutch East Indies
- Died: 23 June 2015 (aged 80) Jakarta, Indonesia
- Spouse: Nafsiah Mboi
- Children: Maria Yosefina Tridia Mboi; Gerardus Majela Mboi; Henri Dunant Mboi
- Education: University of Indonesia

Aloysius Benedictus "Ben" Mboi (22 May 1935 – 23 June 2015) was the Governor of East Nusa Tenggara from 1978 to 1988. By profession he was a physician. His spouse, Nafsiah Mboi, who is also a physician, was Minister of Health from 14 June 2012 until 20 October 2014.

Ben Mboi died in Jakarta at the age of 80 on 23 June 2015.

Political offices
Preceded by El Tari	Governor of East Nusa Tenggara; 1978–1988	Succeeded by Hendrik Fernandez
