= Hendrik Fernandez =

Indonesian politician (1932–2014)

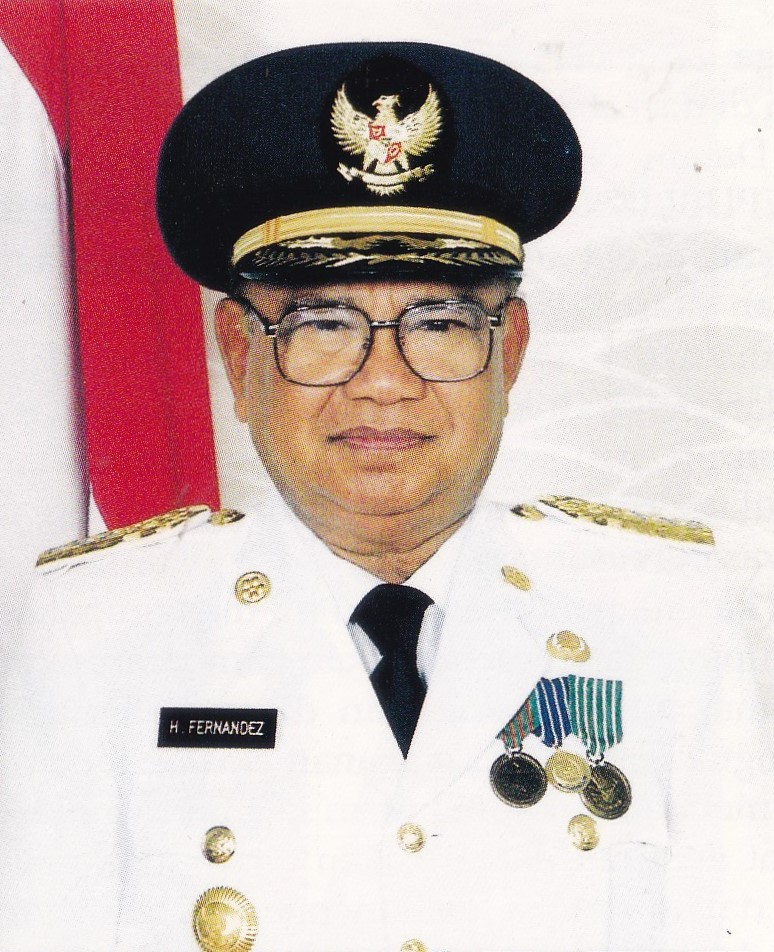

Governor of East Nusa Tenggara
- In office 1988–1993
- President: Suharto
- Preceded by: Ben Mboi
- Succeeded by: Herman Musakabe

Personal details
- Born: November 7, 1932 Kupang, Dutch East Indies
- Died: September 6, 2014 (aged 81) Kupang, East Nusa Tenggara
- Cause of death: Stroke

Hendrik Fernandez (7 November 1932 – 6 September 2014), sometimes known as Dr. Endi, was an Indonesian politician. He was born in Kupang. He was the governor of East Nusa Tenggara from 1988-1993. During his term as governor, Fernandez instituted the Revenue Increasing People's Movement as one of the development programs in the region. One of these programs was to plant one million cashew plant saplings.

Fernandez died at a Kupang hospital on 6 September 2014 due to a complications from a stroke that he had suffered from 4 years previously.

Political offices
Preceded by Ben Mboi	Governor of East Nusa Tenggara; 1988–1993	Succeeded by Herman Musakabe
