= East Atadei language =

Language spoken in Indonesia

East Atadei
- South Lembata
- Native to: Indonesia
- Region: Lembata
- Native speakers: 7,000 (2008 census)
- Language family: Austronesian: Malayo-Polynesian; Central–Eastern; Flores–Lembata; Lamaholot; Levuka–South Lembata; East Atadei

Language codes
- ISO 639-3: lmf
- Glottolog: sout2896
- Coordinates: 8.50°S 123.53°E

East Atadei, also known as South Lembata from its location, is a Central Malayo-Polynesian language of Indonesia spoken in the Atadei District of Lembata, an island east of Flores.
