= Kotshila Junction railway station =

Railway station

KOTSHILA JUNCTION

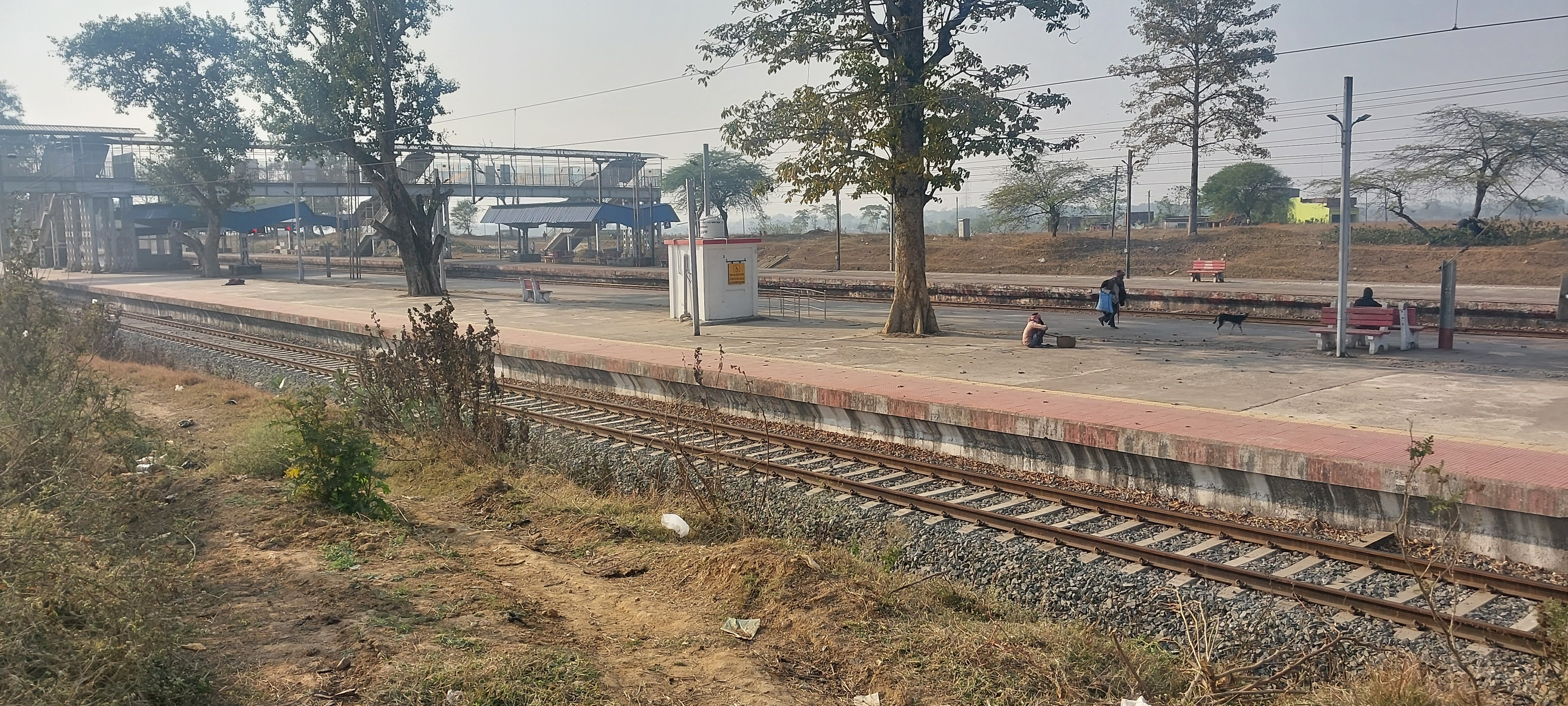
- Kotshila Junction railway station

General information
- Location: Ranchi–Purulia road, Kotshila, Purulia district, West Bengal; India
- Coordinates: 23.3338312°N 85.9006569°E
- Elevation: 312 metres (1,024 ft)
- System: Indian Railways station
- Line: Double electrified BG
- Platforms: 4
- Tracks: 4

Construction
- Parking: Not available

Other information
- Status: Functional
- Station code: KSX
- Zone(s): South Eastern Railway
- Division(s): Adra Division

History
- Opened: 1907
- Closed: 1957
- Rebuilt: 1961

Passengers
- 11,20 (Daily Average, 2019)

Services
| Preceding station | Indian Railways | Following station |
|---|---|---|
| Barbenda towards Purulia Junction | South Eastern Railway zone Purulia–Muri line | Begunkodor towards Muri Junction |
| Damru Ghutu towards Netaji Subhas Chandra Bose Gomoh | South Eastern Railway zone Netaji S. C. Bose Gomoh-Hatia line | Begunkodor towards Hatia |
Location
- Location within West Bengal Location within India
- Interactive map

Kotshila Junction is a railway station of Adra railway division of the South Eastern Railway zone of the Indian Railways. It serve the nearby area of Kotshila town in the Purulia district in the Indian state of West Bengal.

== History ==
The 2 ft 6 in (762 mm)-wide narrow-gauge Purulia–Ranchi line was opened by Bengal Nagpur Railway in 1907.

The construction of the 143 kilometres (89 mi)-long broad-gauge Chandrapura–Muri–Ranchi–Hatia line was started in 1957 and was completed in 1961. The construction of this line included the conversion of the narrow-gauge Kotshila–Ranchi line to broad gauge.

The narrow gauge Purulia–Kotshila sector was converted to broad gauge in 1992.

== Electrification ==
The Purulia–Kotshila sector was electrified in 1998–99.

== Facilities ==
The major facilities available at Kotshila Junction station are waiting rooms, computerised reservation facility, drinking water, reservation counter and vehicle parking. The station also has toilets.

=== Platforms ===
There are 3 platforms and 4 tracks. The platforms are connected by foot overbridge.

=== Station layout ===
| G | Street level | Exit/Entrance & ticket counter |
| P1 | FOB, Side platform, No-1 doors will open on the left/right |
| P1 | Track 1 |
| P1 | Track 2 | toward → |
| P1 | Track 3 | toward → |
| P1 | FOB, Island platform, No- 2 doors will open on the left/right |
| P1 | Island platform, No- 3 doors will open on the left/right |
| Track 4 |
