= Adonara language =

Central Malayo-Polynesian language

Adonara
- Adonara
- Native to: Indonesia
- Region: Adonara, eastern Solor
- Native speakers: 98,000 (2008)
- Language family: Austronesian: Malayo-Polynesian; Central–Eastern; Flores–Lembata; Lamaholot; Adonara

Language codes
- ISO 639-3: adr
- Glottolog: adon1237

Adonara is a Central Malayo-Polynesian language of the island of Adonara and the eastern end of the neighbouring island of Solor, both situated east of Flores in Indonesia.

== Phonology ==
Vowels
	Front	Central	Back
Close	i		u
Mid	e	ə	o
Open		a	

Consonants
		Labial	Alveolar	Palatal	Velar	Glottal
Nasal		m	n		ŋ	
Plosive/ Affricate	voiceless	p	t		k	(ʔ)
Plosive/ Affricate	voiced	b	d	dʒ	ɡ	
Fricative			s			h
Rhotic			r			
Approximant		w	l	j		

The glottal stop [ʔ] mainly occurs in word-initial positions before vowels, and in word-medial positions before vowels.
