= El Tari =

Indonesian politician

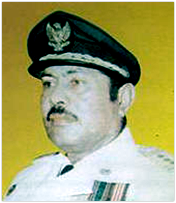

Governor of East Nusa Tenggara
- In office 1966–1978
- President: Sukarno; Suharto
- Preceded by: W. J. Lalamentik
- Succeeded by: Ben Mboi

Personal details
- Born: Elias Tari; 17 April 1926 Savu, Dutch East Indies (Netherlands)
- Died: 29 April 1978 (aged 52) Indonesia
- Cause of death: Kidney failure

Elias Tari (17 April 1926 – 29 April 1978) was the Governor of East Nusa Tenggara from 1966 to 1978. His name became the name of an airport in Kupang, El Tari International Airport.

Political offices
Preceded by W. J. Lalamentik	Governor of East Nusa Tenggara; 1966–1978	Succeeded by Ben Mboi
