= Mingar language =

Austronesian language spoken in Indonesia

Mingar
- West Lembata
- Native to: Indonesia
- Region: Lembata
- Native speakers: 8,000 (2008 census)
- Language family: Austronesian: Malayo-Polynesian; Central–Eastern; Flores–Lembata; Lamaholot; Mingar

Language codes
- ISO 639-3: lmj
- Glottolog: west2541

West Lembata, also known as Mingar, is a Central Malayo-Polynesian language of the island of Lembata, east of Flores in Indonesia.
