= Kedang language =

Language in Indonesia

Kedang
- Native to: Indonesia
- Region: eastern Lembata
- Native speakers: 30,000 (2008 census)
- Language family: Austronesian: Malayo-Polynesian; Central–Eastern; Flores–Lembata; Kedang

Language codes
- ISO 639-3: ksx
- Glottolog: keda1252

Kédang (Kdang, Dang, Kedangese) is a language spoken in the Kedang region on the north coast of Lembata Island, east of Flores, in Indonesia. The language belongs to the Austronesian family and its sub-family, Malayo-Polynesian. More specifically, the language is within the Flores-Lembata sub-group. There are approximately 30,000 speakers of the language.

== Background ==
The name of the language is also the name of the region where the language is spoken, Kedang. The region extends to about 266 square kilometres including two administrative districts – Omesuri and Buyasuri. As of today, there are approximately about 30,000 speakers of the language. The majority of the speakers is engaged in agricultural productions which are mainly farming and fishing. Most speakers are Catholic or Muslim but a few may still retain their traditional spiritual beliefs.

== Phonology ==
=== Vowels ===
Kédang has a total of twelve vowels in its language, separated into two sets evenly with six vowels per set. One set is composed of modal vowels or also known as normal vowels while the other set is breathy vowels. The vowels can be distinct by two different methods: by the word initial position and by the pitch. Modal vowels (normal vowels) occur in the middle and the final position while breathy vowels do not. While the breathy vowels are pronounced at a lower pitch.

Vowels
	Front	Central	Back
Close	i i̤		u ṳ
Open-mid	ɛ ɛ̤		ɔ ɔ̤
Open	æ æ̤	a a̤	

=== Consonants ===
There are twenty consonants in the Kédang alphabet. The consonants display different manners of articulation including plosives, nasals, lateral, flap, trill, fricatives and continuant.

Consonants
		Labial	Dental/ Alveolar	Palatal	Velar	Glottal
Nasal		m	n		ŋ	
Plosive	voiceless	p	t		k	ʔ
Plosive	voiced	b	d		ɡ	
Fricative		v	s			h
Rhotic			ɾ			
Approximant			l	j		

== Word classes ==
Kédang developed its word classes to include nouns, pronouns, adjectives, verbs, adverbs, numerals, prepositions, interjections, conjunctions and classifiers.

=== Nouns ===
Nouns are formed when affixes are added to the verbs. Kédang's affixes are the nominalizing prefix N-, the nominalizing infix -an-, the suffix -n and the free form wala.

- The nominalizing prefix N- replaces the initial consonant. For example:
  - t → n tadaq 'to advise' → nadaq 'advice'
  - k → n kariq 'to speak' → nariq 'language'
- The nominalizing infix -an- is added after the initial consonant. For example:
  - kawang 'to flow' → kanawang 'current'
  - tangul 'to cover a pot with a lid' → tanangul 'lid'
- The suffix -n is added to verbs and adjectives at the end of the words. For example:
  - dei 'to follow' → dein 'offspring'
  - mate 'dead' → maten 'corpse'
- The free form wala follows after a verb to indicate the person who is acting out the verb. For examples:
  - durung 'to sell' → durung wala 'seller'
  - huang 'to play' → huang wala 'player'

=== Pronouns ===
Kédang's pronouns follow the three-way system of singular-dual-plural. They are divided into seven categories: personal, emphatic, possessive, emphatic-possessive, adessive, agent focus and action focus.

	Personal		Emphatic	Possessive	Emphatic-Possessive		Adessive	Agent Focus	Action Focus
	Subjective	Objective			Subjective	Objective			
Person									
1st singular	^{>}ei, ^{>}eqi	^{>}eqi	ko	koq	koqo	koqi	^{>}eko	eti	èrèg
2nd singular	o	o	mo	moq	moqo	meqi	omo	oti	mèrèq
3rd singular	nuo, ni	nuo	ne	neq	neqe	neqi	nene	neti	nèrèq
1st plural exclusive (exclude the addressee(s))	e, ke	e	ke	keq	keqe	keqi	eke	keti	mèrèq
1st plural inclusive (include the addressee(s))	te	te	te	teq	teqe	teqi	tete	teti	tèrèq
2nd plural	me	me	me	meq	meqe	meqi	meme	meti	mèrèq
3rd plural	suo, se	suo	se	seq	seqe	seqi	sese	seti	sèrèq

=== Adjectives ===
Kédang adjectives are divided into two functions: predicative and attributive. In order to distinguish these two functions, a suffix -n is added after the end vowel of a predicative adjective for it to become attributive. If the adjective ends with a consonant, there will be no change.

	Predicative	Attributive
'wet'	baha	bahan
'alive'	bita	bitan
'sour'	kiru	kirun
'new'	werun	werun
'red'	korong	korong
'shy'	iwiq	iwiq

=== Verbs ===
There is only one verb tense in Kédang that is fully developed – future tense. The other tenses usually require an adverb that indicates time (past, present or future) to support the content along with the verb used.

Future Tense ('will')
	Singular	Plural
Person		
1st exclusive (exclude addressee(s))	ena	kena
1st inclusive (including addressee(s))		tena
2nd	ona	mena
3rd	nena	sena
