= Flores–Lembata languages =

Subgroup of the Austronesian language family

Flores–Lembata
- Geographic distribution: Indonesia (Lesser Sunda Islands)
- Linguistic classification: Austronesian: Malayo-Polynesian; (Central); Eastern Lesser Sunda languages; Flores–Lembata
- Subdivisions: Kedang; Sika–Lamaholot

Language codes
- Glottolog: flor1239

The Flores–Lembata languages are a group of related Austronesian languages (geographically Central–Eastern Malayo-Polynesian languages) spoken in the Lesser Sundas, on eastern Flores and small islands immediately east of Flores, Indonesia. They are suspected of having a non-Austronesian substratum, with extreme morphological simplification in Sikka and secondarily in Alorese, but not to a greater extent than the Central Malayo-Polynesian languages in general.

== Languages ==
The generally accepted defined Flores–Lembata languages are:

- Kedang
- Sikka
- Lamaholot

In addition, the following is often grouped either as a dialect of Lamaholot or its own language:

- Adonara
- Alorese

Lamaholot is a dialect chain. Ethnologue treats ten varieties as distinct languages.

== Classification ==
Elias (2017) proposes the following internal classification of Flores–Lembata.

- Flores–Lembata
  - Sikka–Hewa
    - Sikka
    - Hewa
  - Kedang–Lamaholot
    - Kedang
    - Lamaholot
      - Central Lamaholot
      - Eastern–Western Lamaholot
        - Eastern Lamaholot
        - Alorese–Western Lamaholot
          - Alorese
          - Western Lamaholot

Linguistic areas are:

- East Lembata: Kedan, Eastern Lamaholot
- Sedentary Lembata: Eastern Lamaholot, Alorese, Western Lamaholot, Central Lamaholot

== See also ==
- Central Flores languages
