= Alas Strait =

- Selat Alas (Indonesian)
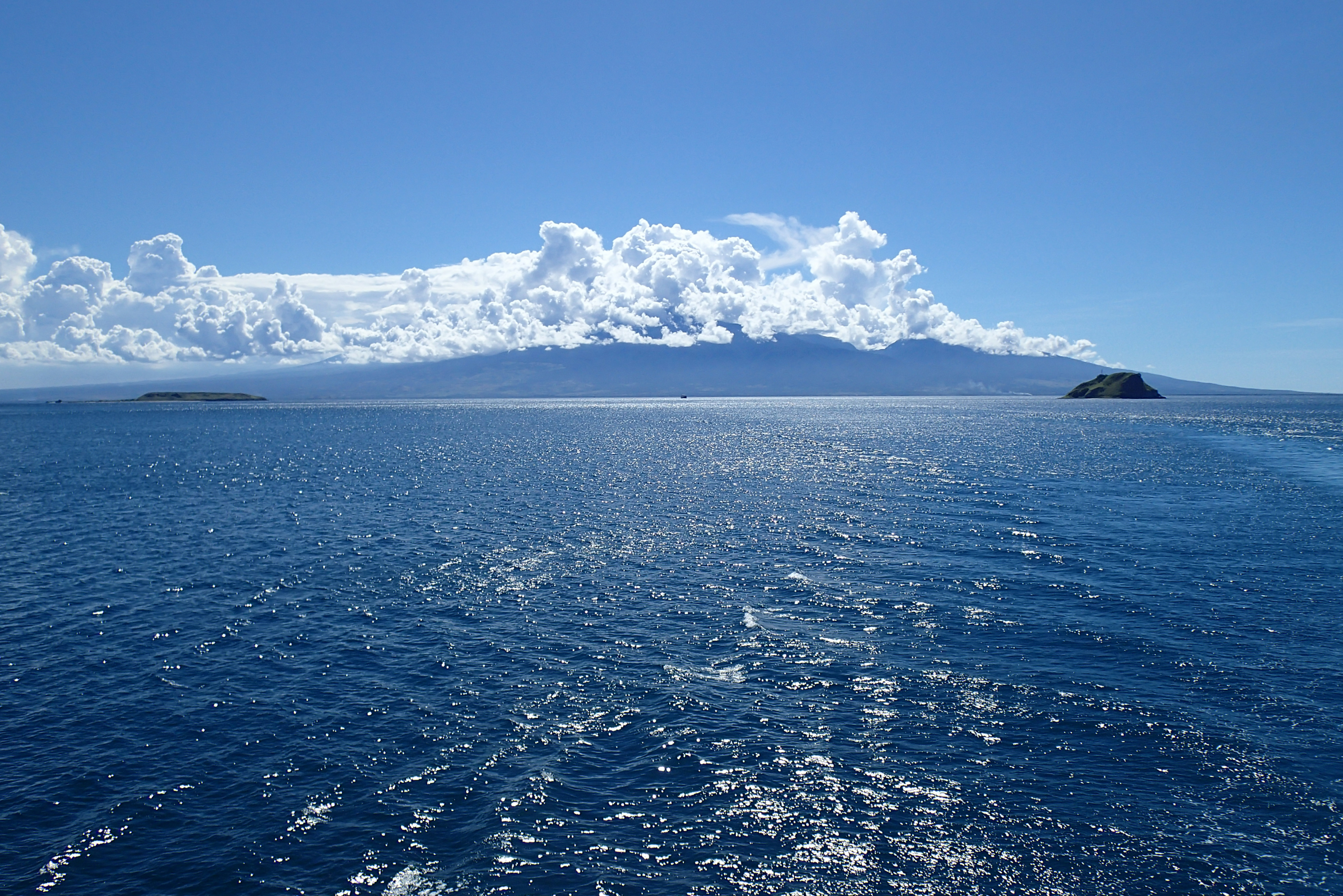
- The Alas Strait, looking westwards with Mount Rinjani on Lombok in the background.

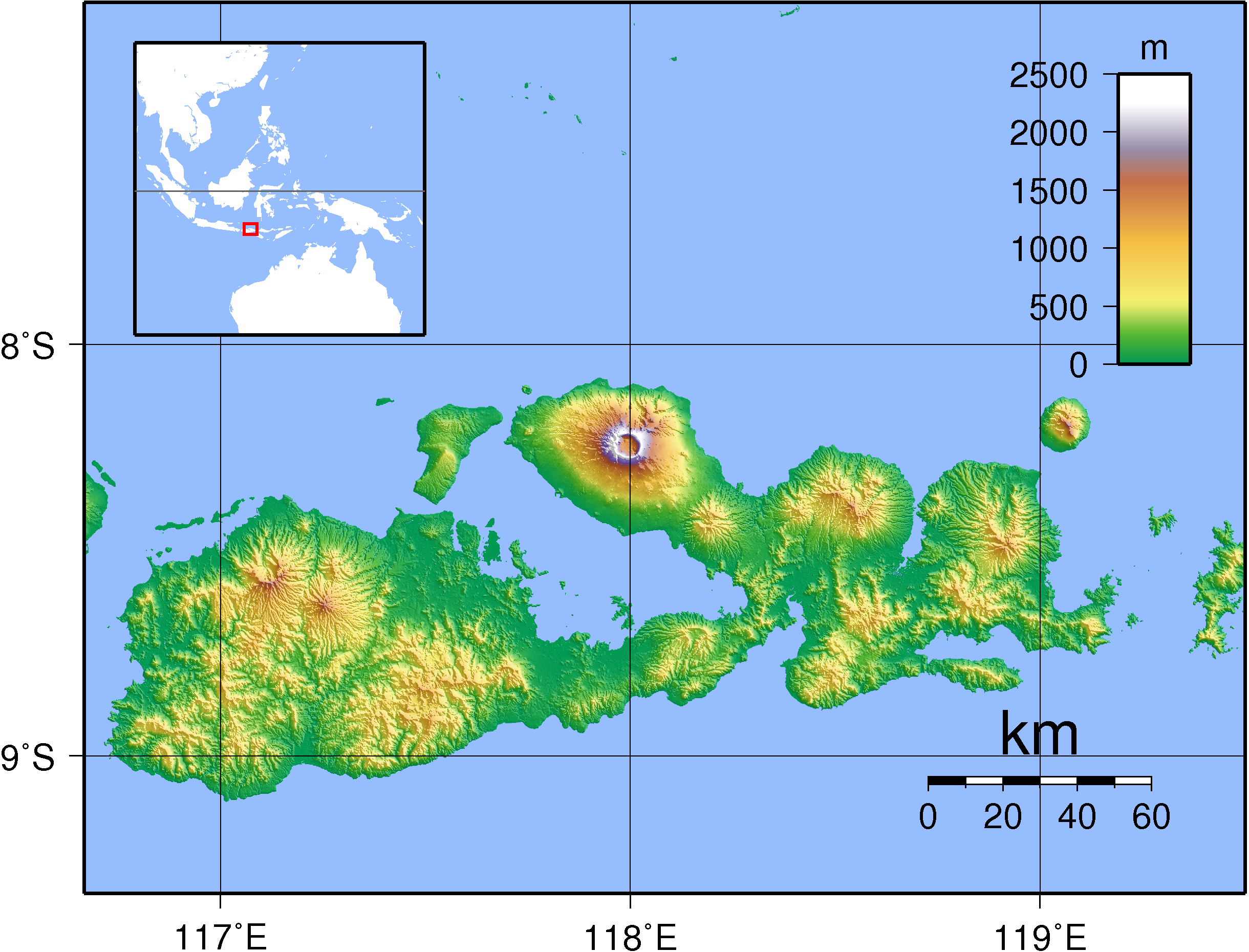
- Sumbawa island, with the Alas Strait to its left
- Coordinates: 8°40′S 116°40′E
- Type: strait
- Basin countries: Indonesia
- References: Selat Alas: Indonesia National Geospatial-Intelligence Agency, Bethesda, MD, USA

The Alas Strait is a strait that separates Lombok and Sumbawa, the two principal islands of West Nusa Tenggara province in Indonesia.

The strait was bridged by land until about 14,000 years before present when sea level rose to about 75 meters below present sea level, unlike Lombok Strait and Alor Strait which continued to be water gaps even during the Last Glacial Maximum, at each end of a 400-mile-long island including present-day Lombok, Sumbawa, Komodo, Flores, Solor, Adonara, and Lembata.

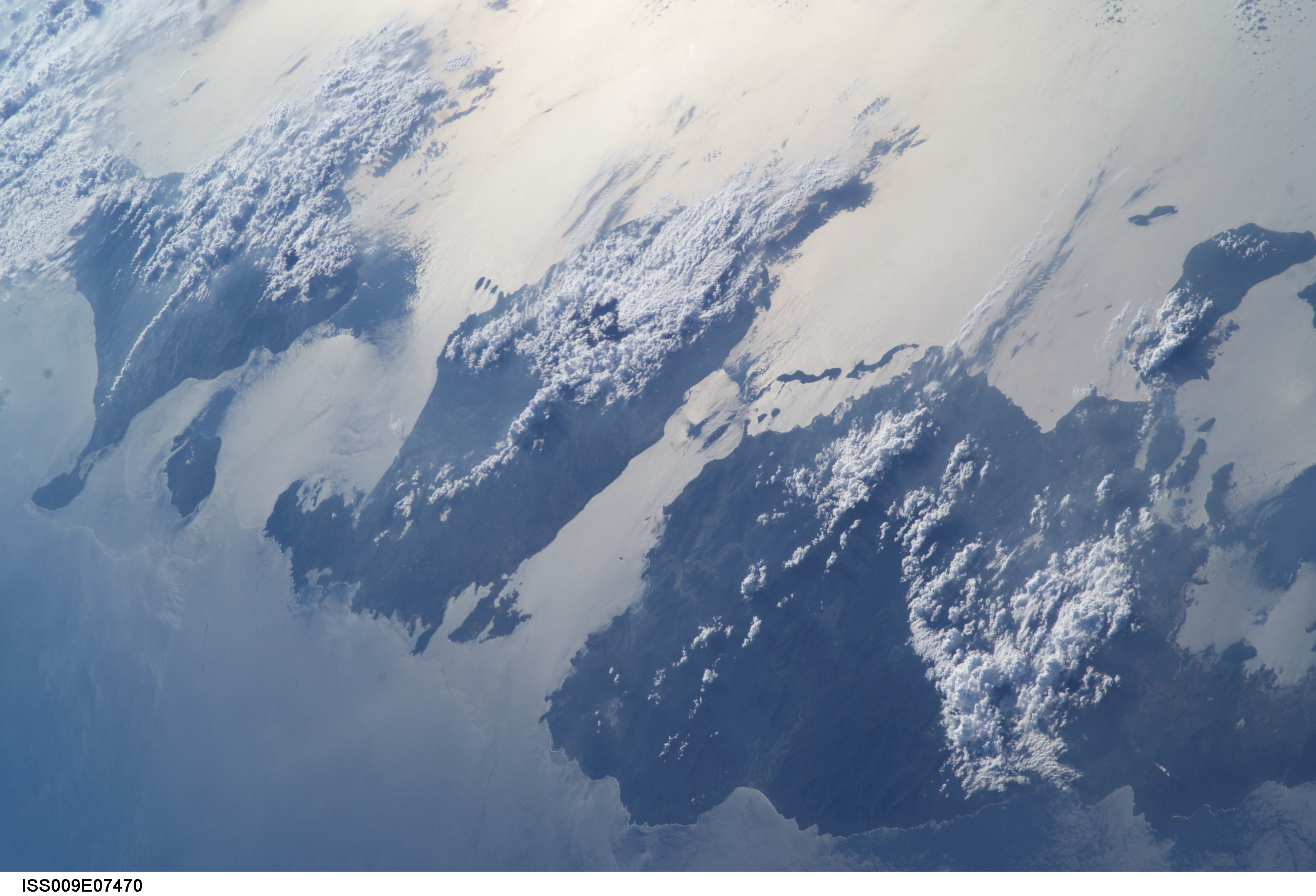
Alas Strait between Lombok (middle) and Sumbawa (right), seen from the International Space Station

== See also ==
- Makassar Strait
- Sunda Strait
- Wallacea
