= Larantuka Malay =

Malay-based creole language

- Ende Malay (misnomer possible)
- bahasa Nagi
- Native to: Indonesia
- Region: Flores (Larantuka)
- Ethnicity: Nagi people
- Native speakers: 20,000 (2007)
- Language family: Malay-based creole: Eastern Indonesia Malay; Larantuka Malay
- Dialects: Dili Malay; Konga Bay; Larantuka; Wure
- Writing system: Latin

Official status
- Recognised minority language in: Indonesia

Language codes
- ISO 639-3: lrt
- Glottolog: lara1260
- Main location of use of the Larantuka Malay in Flores, especially in East Flores (red).

Larantuka Malay (bahasa Nagi, Melayu Larantuka), also known as Nagi, is a Malay-based creole language spoken in the eastern part of Flores in Indonesia, especially in Larantuka. It is a derivative of Malay which is thought to originate from Malacca. It is a language with unspecified linguistic affiliation. According to 2007 data, this language is spoken by 20,000 speakers, mainly the people of East Flores. Larantuka Malay is the mother tongue of the Nagi people. Then it also functions as a second language for several nearby communities.

Apart from the Larantuka, speakers also live in Konga which are also on Flores and Wure (Wureh) on Adonara, where the two dialects are different. In literature it is also called Ende Malay. However, this name is not quite correct and it is not known where it came from, because it was never used at all in Ende. Contrary to the geographical proximity of the two Malay varieties mentioned earlier, they are not at all related to Kupang Malay. Historically, this language has high prestige, where it is a language with a higher status in the eastern part of the island, However, its role was reduced due to pressure from the national language, namely Indonesian. Among its users, it is even starting to be considered a variety of Indonesian.

In terms of grammatical typology, Larantuka Malay can be considered as an isolating language, "with little productive morphology of any kind, apart of reduplication."

== Linguistic characteristics ==
The name "Nagi" refers to the origins of their language and ethnicity, originating from the Malay word negeri, which means 'place of birth'. The origins and classification of this language are still unclear. It appears to display characteristics of the Western Malay variety, as well as the Malay variants found in eastern Indonesia, especially in the branch of Eastern Indonesia Malay. According to the directory by Ethnologue (22nd edition) this is a Malay-based creole language. However, when compared with other varieties of Eastern Indonesia Malay, this language has its own lexical and phonological characteristics. Unlike the languages in these branches, this language never became a lingua franca or developed to the detriment of local languages. Larantuka Malay clearly shows lexical influence from Lamaholot. There are also many words borrowed from Portuguese. Its unusual feature is the mixed possessive construction, the highly productive serial verb construction, using different verb pairs, as well as partial reduplication or with a change of subject.

Structural and phonological characteristics indicate that Larantuka Malay formed independently from the geographically closest Malay variety, although in its development it takes over some of its properties (including a certain order of possessive structures — possessor-possessum with the connector 'puN'). This language is thought to have migrated directly from the Malay Peninsula together with its speakers. It is possible that this was the result of mixing varieties from the Malay Peninsula with historic commercial varieties, however, the course of this process is never known. Their separate origins are also indicated by most of the vocabulary.

== Documentation ==
Larantuka Malay has been documented to some extent, including unpublished grammatical and dictionary data, which is Kamus Dwibahasa..., 1975; Morfologi dan Sintaksis Bahasa Melayu Larantuka, 1985; Struktur Kata dan Struktur Frasa Bahasa Melayu Larantuka, 1993. H. Steinhauer (1991) discusses the phonology and development of Larantuka Malay.^{1991} This language is written in Latin script, although on a minimal scale. Literature is underdeveloped and limited to certain groups of texts. Larantuka Malay is considered an endangered language. Especially because the national language, Indonesian, is used in the education activity, mass media, and religious activity.

== Pronouns ==
=== Personal pronouns ===
The following are personal pronouns in Malay Larantuka.

1. pr. sl.	kita beta	1. pr. pl.	(kә)toraN
2. pr. sl.	(әN)ko no (m.) / oa (f.)	2. pr. pl.	(әN)koraN kamu-oraN
3. pr. sl.	bicu (m.) / bica (f.)	3. pr. pl.	doraN dәraN

== Sources ==
- Adelaar, K. Alexander; Prentice, David J.; Grijns, Cornells D.; Steinhauer, Hein; van Engelenhoven, Aone (1996). "Malay: its history, role and spread". In Wurm, Stephen A.; Mühlhäusler, Peter; Tryon, Darrell T. (eds.). Atlas of Languages of Intercultural Communication in the Pacific, Asia, and the Americas: Vol I: Maps. Vol II: Texts. Trends in Linguistics. Documentation 13. Berlin/New York: Mouton de Gruyter. pp. 673–693. doi:10.1515/9783110819724.2.673. ISBN 9783110819724. OCLC 1013949454.
- Bos, Paula R. (2005). "Nagi music and community: belonging and displacement in Larantuka, eastern Indonesia". In Hae-kyung Um (ed.). Diasporas and Interculturalism in Asian Performing Arts: Translating Traditions. Abingdon–New York: RoutledgeCurzon. pp. 144–158. doi:10.4324/9780203641903. ISBN 0-203-64190-6. OCLC 53215736. ISBN 0-700-71586-X.
- Collins, James T.; Mufwene, Salikoko S.; Escobar, Anna María; et al. (Language Spread) (2022). "The Geographic and Demographic Expansion of Malay". The Cambridge Handbook of Language Contact. Population Movement and Language Change. Cambridge Handbooks in Language and Linguistics. Vol. 1. Cambridge: Cambridge University Press. pp. 327–357. doi:10.1017/9781316796146.016. ISBN 978-1-009-09864-9. OCLC 1330434857.
- Paauw, Scott H. (2009). The Malay contact varieties of eastern Indonesia: A typological comparison (PDF). The State University of New York at Buffalo. OCLC 6002898562.
- Wurm, Stephen A.; Mühlhäusler, Peter; Tryon, Darrell T.; Alexander, Adelaar K.; Prentice, David J.; Grijns, Cornells D.; Steinhauer, Hein; van Engelenhoven, Aone (1996). "Malay: its history, role and spread". Atlas of Languages of Intercultural Communication in the Pacific, Asia, and the Americas: Vol I: Maps. Vol II: Texts. Trends in Linguistics. Documentation 13. Berlin–New York: Walter de Gruyter. pp. 673–693. doi:10.1515/9783110819724.2.673. ISBN 978-3-11-081972-4. OCLC 1013949454.
- Steinhauer, Hein (1991). "Malay in east Indonesia: the case of Larantuka (Flores)". Papers in Austronesian Linguistics (PDF). Pacific Linguistics A-81. Canberra: Department of Linguistics, Research School of Pacific Studies, Australian National University. pp. 177–195. doi:10.15144/PL-A81.177. ISBN 0858834022. OCLC 646958819.
