= Waiwerang =

Coordinates: 8°23′S 123°09′E

Waiwerang is a town in East Adonara District of East Flores Regency, situated on Adonara Island, Indonesia. It is the largest community on Adonara. In the center of Waiwerang stands an obelisk built from September 1960 to August 1961 in a square beside another square that hosts government and social events. The town (kelurahan) had only 3,850 inhabitants in mid 2023, but is flanked by the villages (desa) of Lamahala Jaya (with 6,980 inhabitants) and Terong (with 2,089 inhabitants) to the west and Waiburak (with 3,315 inhabitants) to the east, the combined communities forming an urban area of 16,234 in the centre of Adonara's south coast, directly facing Lamakera (on Solor Island) across the Solor Strait.

Waiwerang is a transit harbour used by sea transportation from and to Lamakera on the eastern end of Solor Island, the regency capital of Larantuka on the mainland of East Flores, and Lewoleba on Lembata Island.
