= Treaty of Lisbon (1859) =

1859 treaty between the Netherlands and Portugal

The Treaty of Demarcation and Exchange of Some Portuguese and Dutch Possessions in the Archipelago of Solor and Timor (Portuguese: Tratado de Demarcação e Troca de Algumas Possessões Portuguesas e Neerlandesas no Arquipélago de Solor e Timor) was a treaty signed between the Kingdom of Portugal (then ruled by Dom Pedro V) and the Netherlands (ruled by William III), on 20 April 1859, which demarcated the border between the colonies of the two kingdoms in the Indonesian Archipelago.

They were represented as plenipotentiaries on the Portuguese side by António Maria de Fontes Pereira de Melo, then Minister of Internal Affairs of the Kingdom of Portugal, and on the Dutch side by Maurits Jan Heldewier, chargé d'affaires of the Netherlands.

By this treaty, Portugal ceded Larantuca, Sicca and Paga on the island of Flores, Wouré on the island of Adonara, and Pamung Kaju on the island of Solor. In return, the Netherlands ceded the kingdoms of Maubara and Ambeno, both on the island of Timor, as well the island of Ataúro. The treaty was ratified on 18 August 1860.

== Treaty articles ==
The treaty, written in French and translated into Portuguese, contained the following articles:

1. Establishes the boundaries between Portuguese and Dutch territories on the Island of Timor;
2. Acknowledges the sovereignty of each kingdom over its respective possessions;
3. Defines the limits of Oecusse (or Oikoussi);
4. Recognizes Portugal's acknowledgment of Dutch sovereignty in the western part of Timor.;
5. Transfers Maubara and Ambeno, which already "fly the Portuguese flag," to Portuguese control;
6. Affirms the Netherlands' relinquishment of any claim to the island of Ataúro;
7. Confirms Portugal's cession of Larantuka, Sikka, and Paga on the island of Flores; the state of Wouré on Adonara Island; and the state of Pamang Kaju on Solor Island to the Netherlands;
8. Grants the Netherlands full possession of the aforementioned territories;
9. As compensation, the Netherlands cancels a debt of 80,000 florins borrowed by Portugal in 1851 and agrees to pay an additional 120,000 florins, to be delivered one month after the ratification of the treaty;
10. Guarantees freedom of worship in the exchanged territories;
11. Stipulates that the treaty be submitted to the parliaments of the respective kingdoms for exchange of ratifications, to be carried out in Lisbon.
