= Iliboleng =

Volcano in East Nusa Tenggara

Ile Boleng
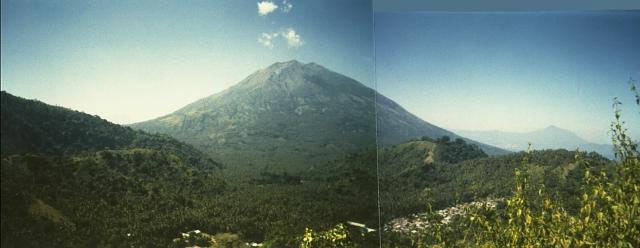
- Ile Boleng seen from Bukit Tomu, north of the volcano

Highest point
- Elevation: 1,658 m (5,440 ft)
- Prominence: 1,658 m (5,440 ft)
- Listing: Ultra; Ribu
- Coordinates: 8°20′38″S 123°15′07″E

Naming
- Language of name: Lamaholot

Geography
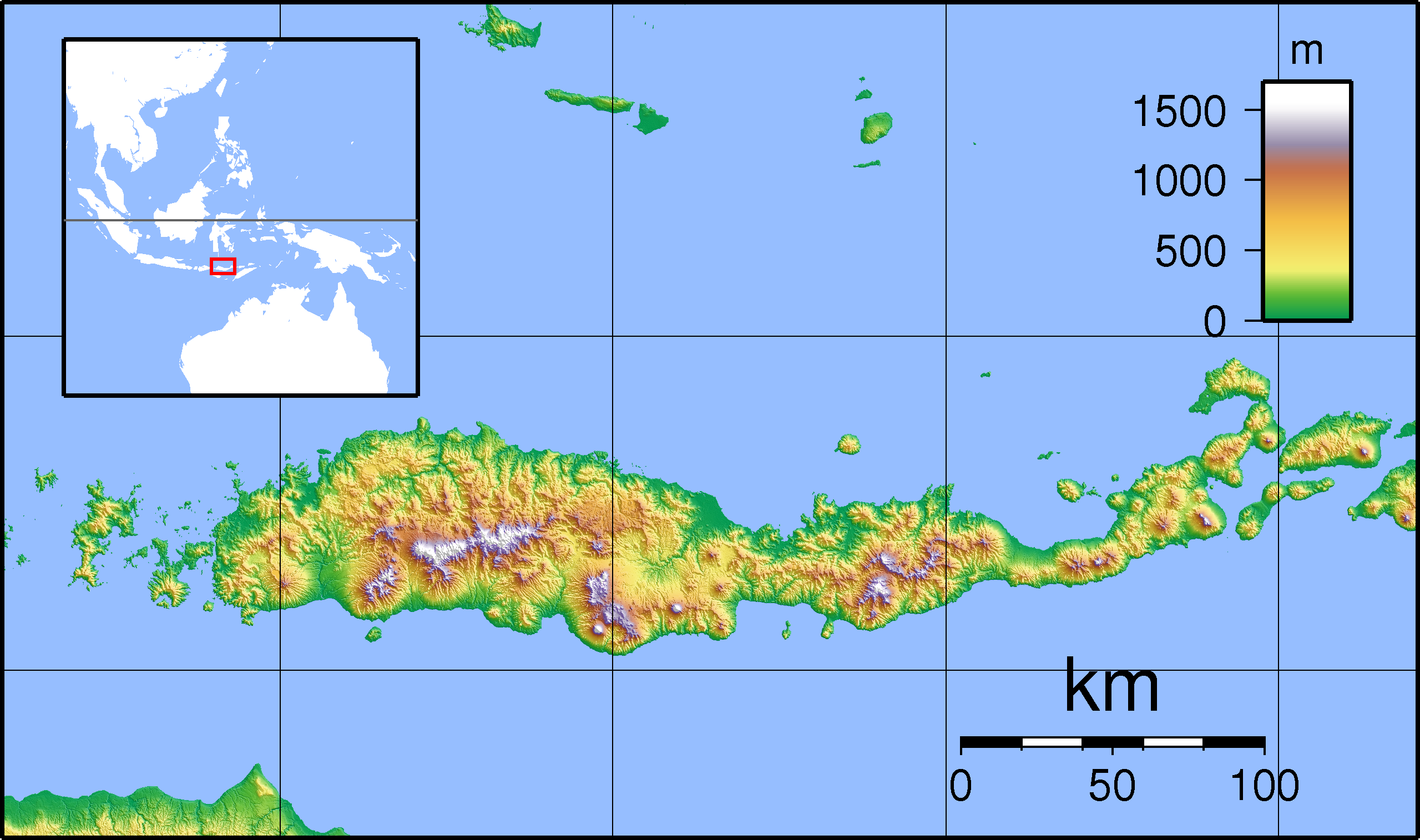
- Location within Flores
- Location: Adonara, Flores Timur, Nusa Tenggara Timur Indonesia

Geology
- Mountain type: Stratovolcano
- Volcanic arc: Sunda Arc
- Last eruption: June to July 1993

The Iliboleng is a stratovolcano located at the southeast end of Adonara Island in Flores in Indonesia.

The top of the volcano was created by several summit craters. The first eruption was recorded in 1885. The activity is classified as moderate.

== See also ==
- List of volcanoes in Indonesia
