= Nelelamadike =

Nelelamadike Desa Nelelamadike
- Village
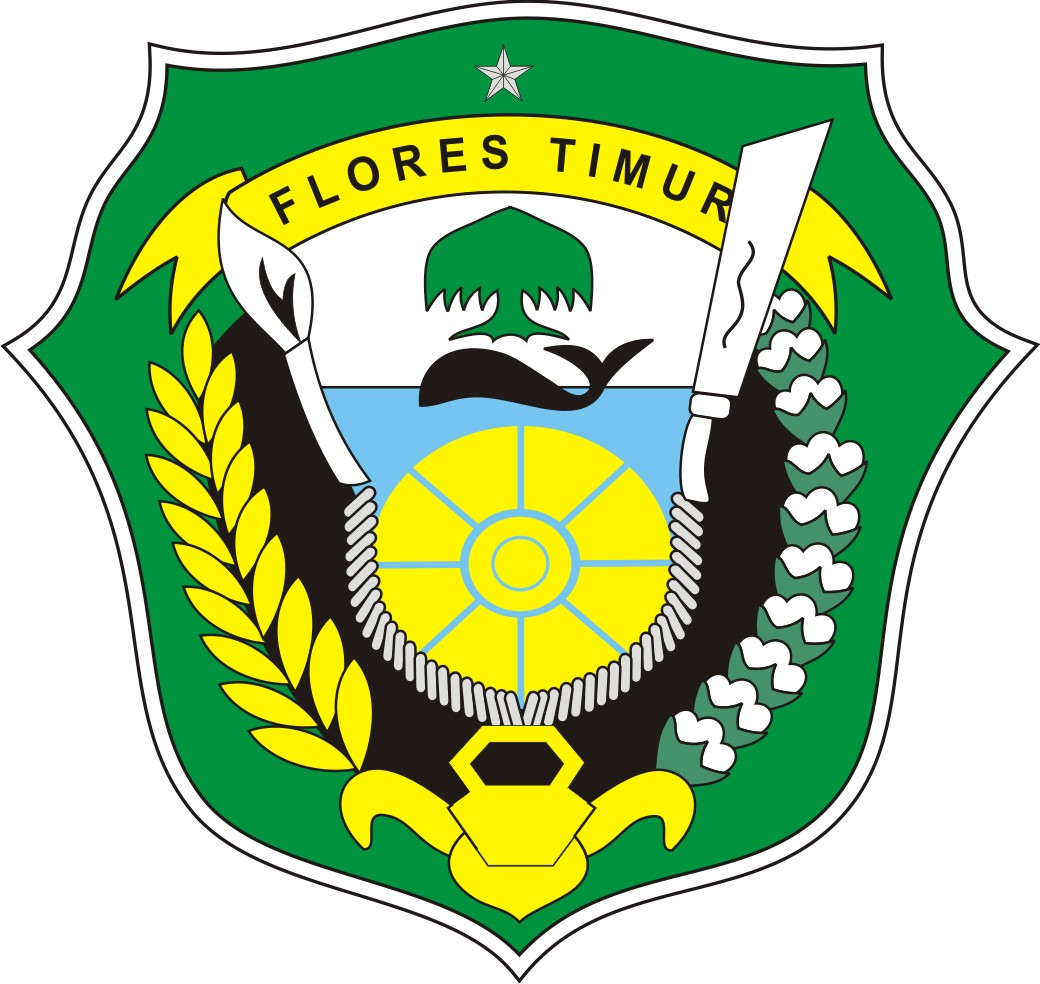
- Seal

- Location within East Nusa Tenggara

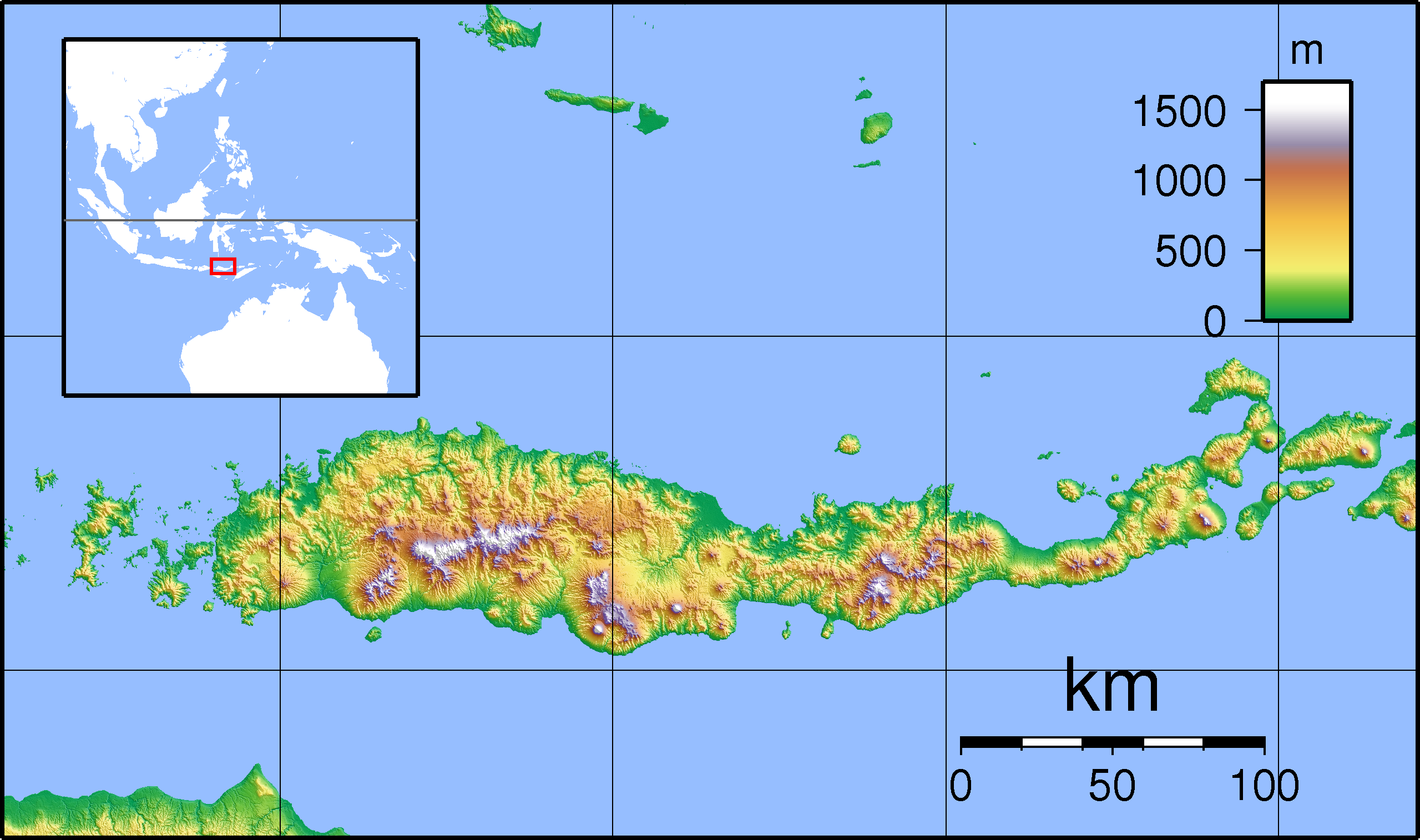
- Location in Flores, Lesser Sunda Islands and Indonesia Nelelamadike (Lesser Sunda Islands) Nelelamadike (Indonesia)
- Coordinates: 8.3625564°S 123.2610879°E
- Country: Indonesia
- Province: East Nusa Tenggara
- District: Ile Boleng

Government
  - Village Head: Theresia Tuto Pati

Area
  - Total: 1.60 sq mi (4.14 km^{2})

Population (2018)
  - Total: 1,247
  - Density: 780/sq mi (301/km^{2})
- Time zone: UTC+8 (ICST)
- Post code: 86253
- Area code: (+62) 383
- Website: nelelamadike.opendesa.id

Nelelamadike is a village in Ile Boleng district (kecamatan), East Flores Regency, East Nusa Tenggara Province, Indonesia.

== Location and Borders ==
- North border: Mount Boleng
- East border: Neleblolong Village
- South border: Nobo Village
- West border: Harubala Village

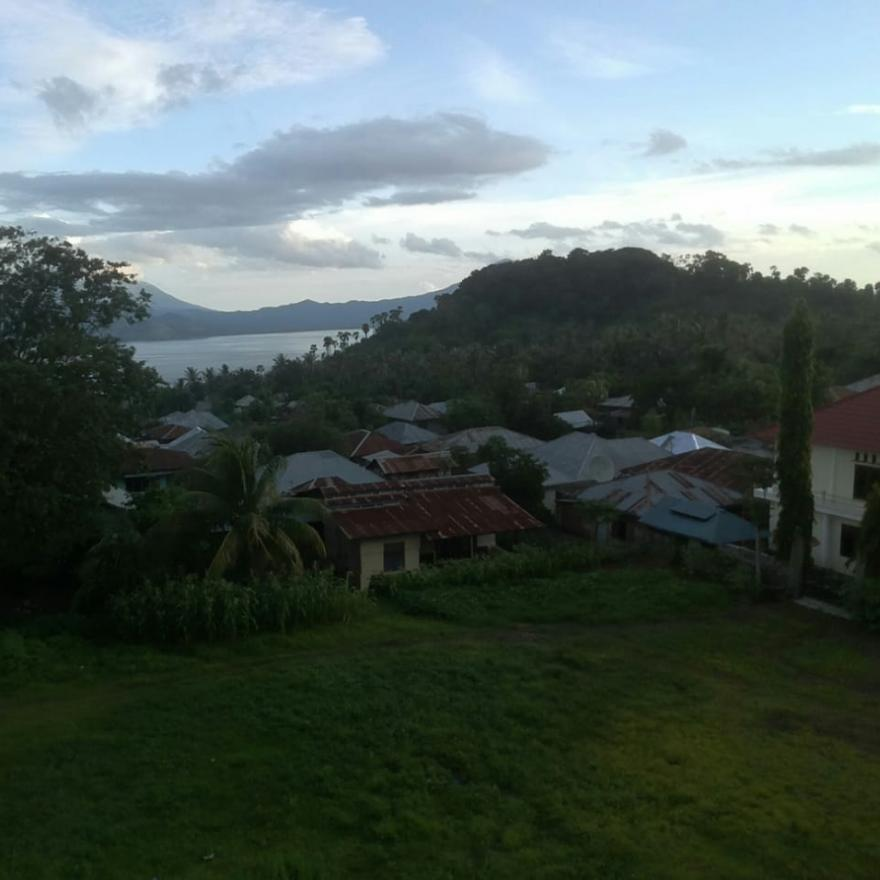

== History ==
Originally from the village of Nelelamadike, previously called the name Lewo Lamanele. According to the speaker: from Lewo Lamanele from Mount Boleng, namely Nelereren and parents who occupied the first Lewo were: Wurin's Old Man. From the descendants of Wurin and other migrants there were more and more so that Lewo Lamanele was formed. After the development of the government every year before with the Hamete center in Boleng, Lamanele was led by the village head Mr Kia Uba. He took the lead from about 1948 until the formation of a new style village in 1966, and Lamanele Village joined Pukaone Village, and finally formed a new style village called Desa Neleblolong, which was led by the village head of Pukaone namely, Bapak Andreas Ola Ama for two years.

In 1968 the village head was replaced by Mr. Aloysius Tupen The name also came from Pukaone, from 1968 until 1991. And for Lamanele assisted by Pamong Desa and the first to take office was Sebastianus Sabon Gua. And then replaced by Gergorius Gega Bala. In 1991 - 1994 the Village Chief Neleblolong was replaced by Mr. Simon Said Ola from Lamanele. Whereas the pamong of Lamanele village was replaced by Siprianus Sanak Kian starting in 1997. In 1997 - 1999 Lamanele village was given the authority to take care of themselves and make requests at the Regency level to be expanded. And on March 6, 2000, it was officially opened by Mr. Plt. East Flores Regent Drs. L. Mekeng with the name of the village of Nelelamadike and the head of his village, Siprianus Sanak Kian. And finally in June 2007 Mr. Siprianus Sanak Kian was replaced by Mr. Agustinus Boro Nubi who was appointed by Mr. East Flores Regent Drs. Simon Hayon on June 26, 2007, and ended on June 26, 2013. After the term of office of Mr. Agustinus Boro Nubi on June 26, 2013, the Village Chief of Nelelamadike was led by Ms. Theresia Tuto Pati, who was sworn in on October 20, 2013, by Ile sub-district head Boleng Kia Sanga Fransiskus and his term of office will expire on October 20, 2019.

== Local Products ==
=== Corn Crackers ("Jagung Titi") ===
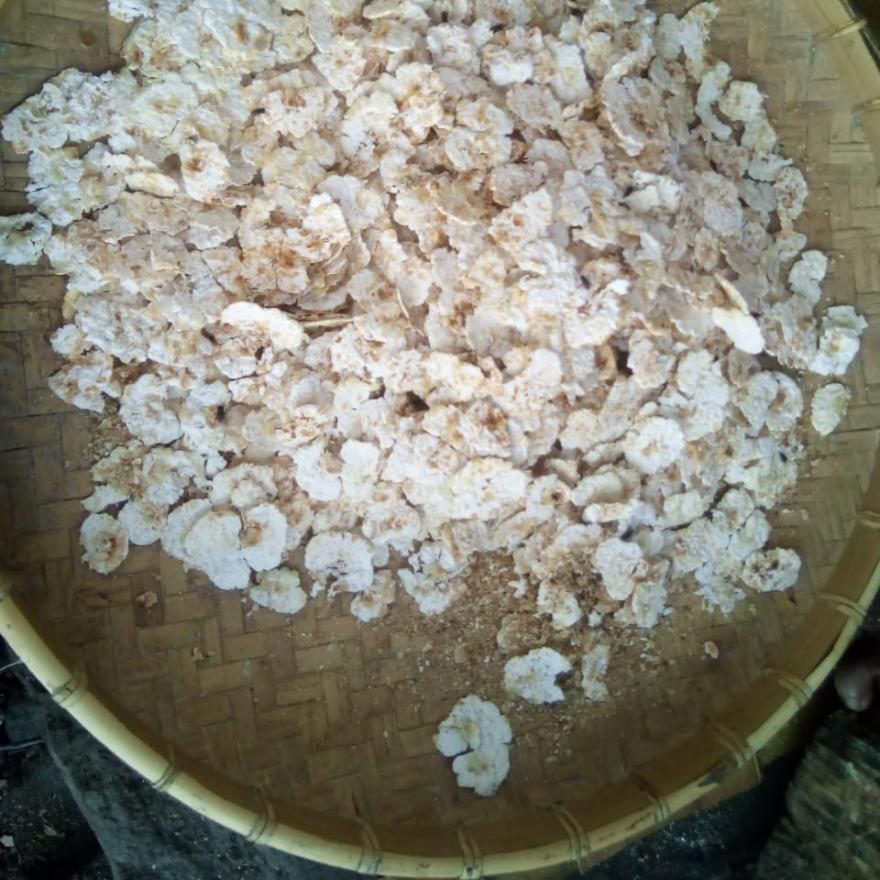
Corn cracker as a local product of Nelelamadike Village shared by the village officials.

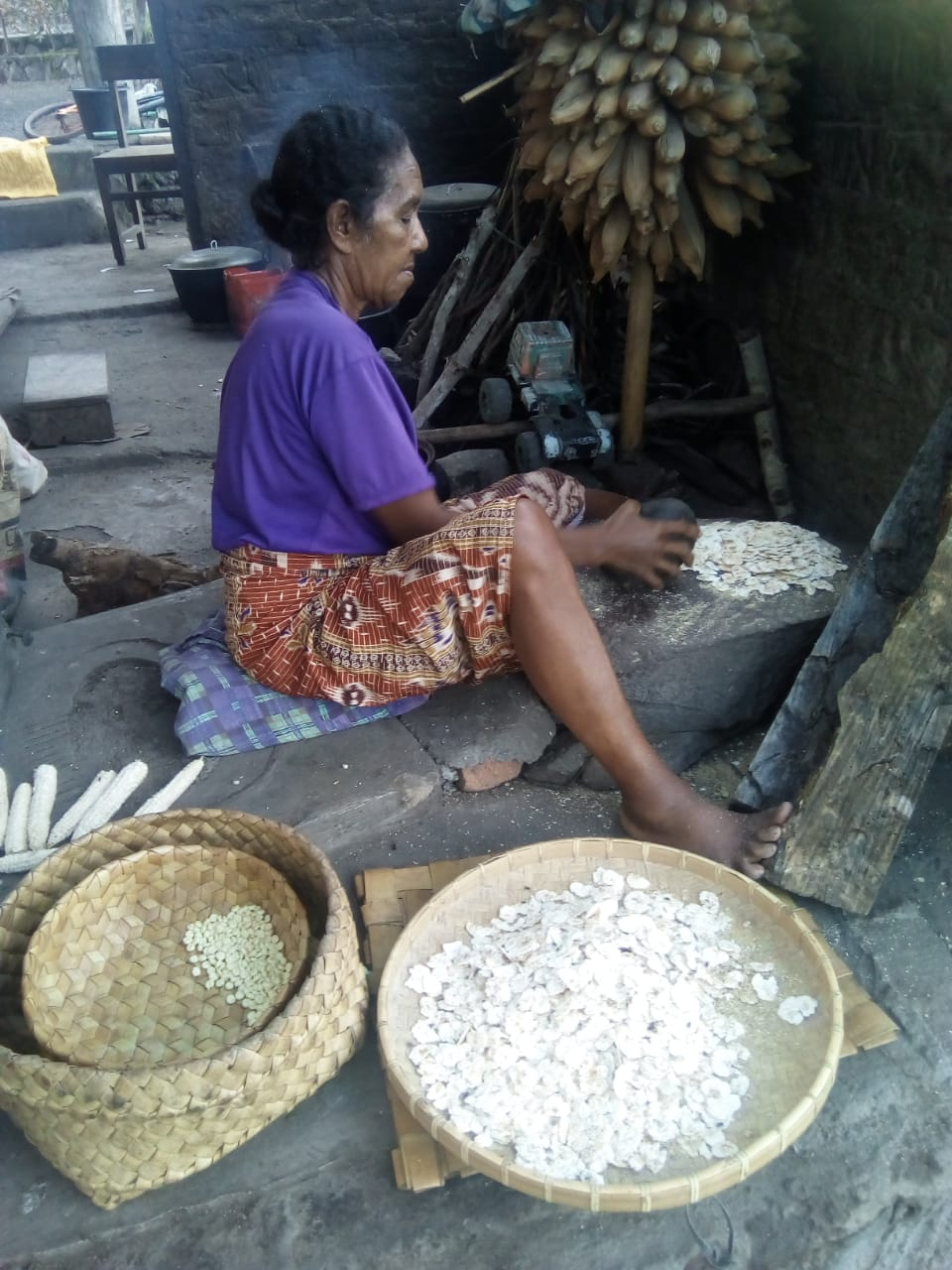
Corn cracker making process as local product of Nelelamadike Village

Corn crackers, or in local name "Jagung Titi" is one of the typical foods in the Lamaholot tribe, especially in the East Flores region, and also a local product and superior products for daily needs for mothers in Nelelamadike Village, Ile Boleng District, Flores Timur Regency, Nusa Province East Southeast.

This crackers tastes savory and crispy and the making process is very easy however it may be rather difficult for those who are just trying. With corn based ingredients is processed with simple and natural tools. Only have one stone measuring approximately 15–30 cm which has a flat and slippery surface 1 Stone Beach with a size of approximately 12 cm as a larger stone pair.

In the Lamaholot language (Language for wilaya Timur Flores, Solor and lembata) the two stones are usually referred to as "WATO INA NO WATO ANA". Wato Ina means, bigger stone while Wato Ana means smaller stone. Both of these stones are used to climb corn which has been stirred until it forms into a melinjo chips on the island of Java.

The oseng tool uses "KEWIK" (Periuk Kecil) made of Clay. The stove is set on the coals of fire, with the stove being made in the shape of a U or even V. To process it does not have to use fried spoons or other spoons that only use 1 small piece of wood is rotated in the middle of a collection of corn seeds that are inside (Kewik) earlier, so that the ripening process is evenly distributed. Once cooked, corn is taken empty-handed or without any base, so the one who climbs Titi Corn must get used to his hands. Beside a bigger stone there must be (Keleka) (Containers made from woven Lontar leaves which are used to store Corn that has been titied. Well, that's just how to manage it, then this corn can be sold on the market by mothers or for food at home. And generally in traditional events in East Flores, Titi corn is the main menu to serve as one of the terms of tribal culture. Lamaholot. And nowadays there are a number of small businessmen who are starting to process it again and sell it in the form of tidier packaging

=== Woven Fabric ("Tenun Ikat") ===
Another local product of Nelelamadike Village is the traditional woven fabric or "Tenun Ikat" in local language. When you visit the village, you will see people wearing tenun ikat.

Originally, the fabric must be present at all cultural occasions such as births, weddings and death ceremonies. It is also an important form of dowry that should be presented by a bride to her groom. The women play an important role in preserving this heritage. They must master the skill of weaving as they are the ones responsible for making fabric for their husbands and children.

For the purpose of commercial, this woven fabric is also mass-produced to meet the demand of local market and also regionally and internationally.

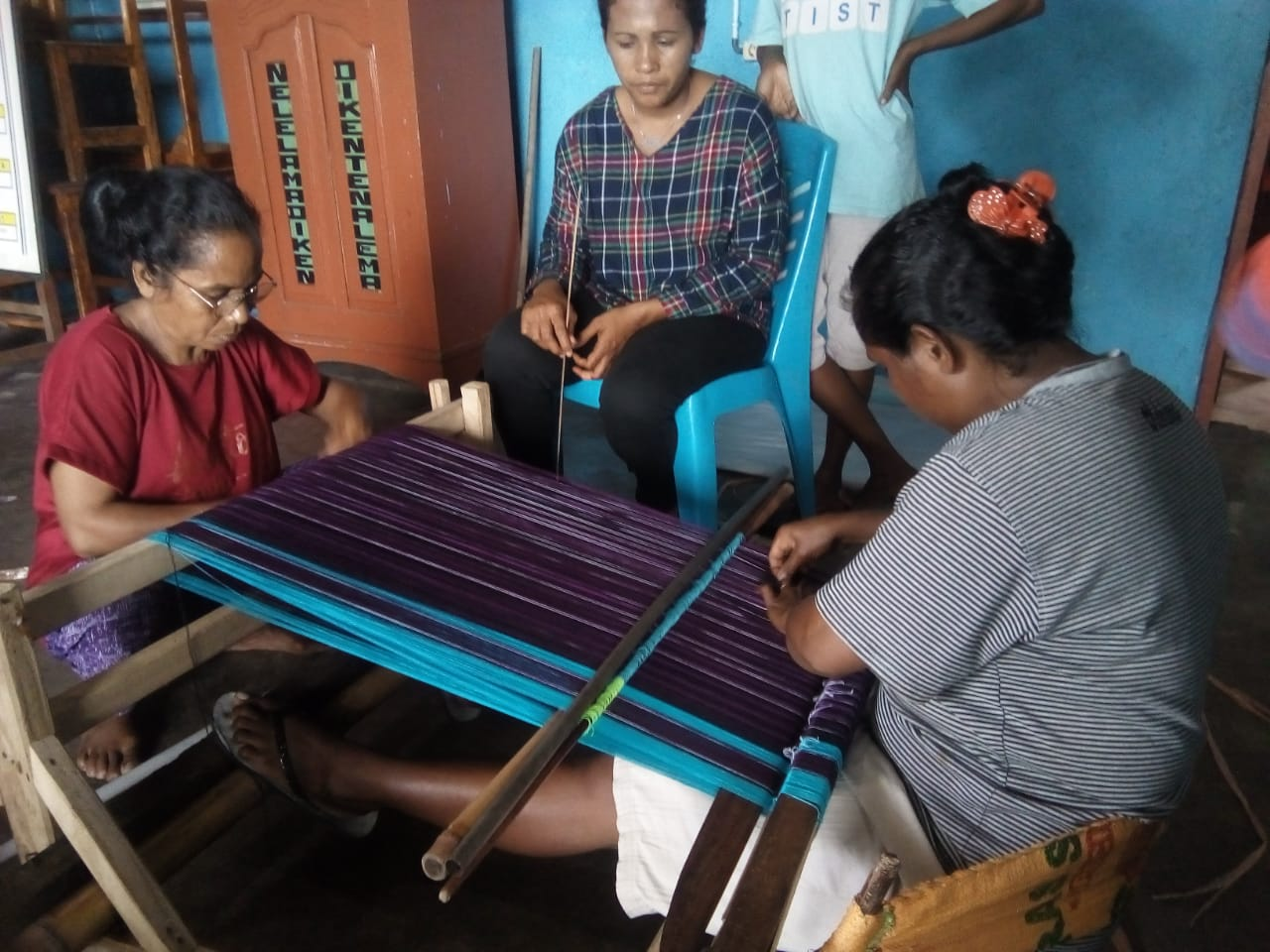
Woven fabric as a local product of Nelelamadike Village shared by the village officials.
