= Solor Archipelago =

Group of islands in the Lesser Sunda Islands, Indonesia

Coordinates: 8.41667°S 123.45°E

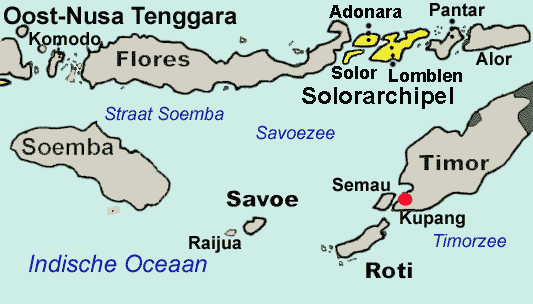
Solor Archipelago

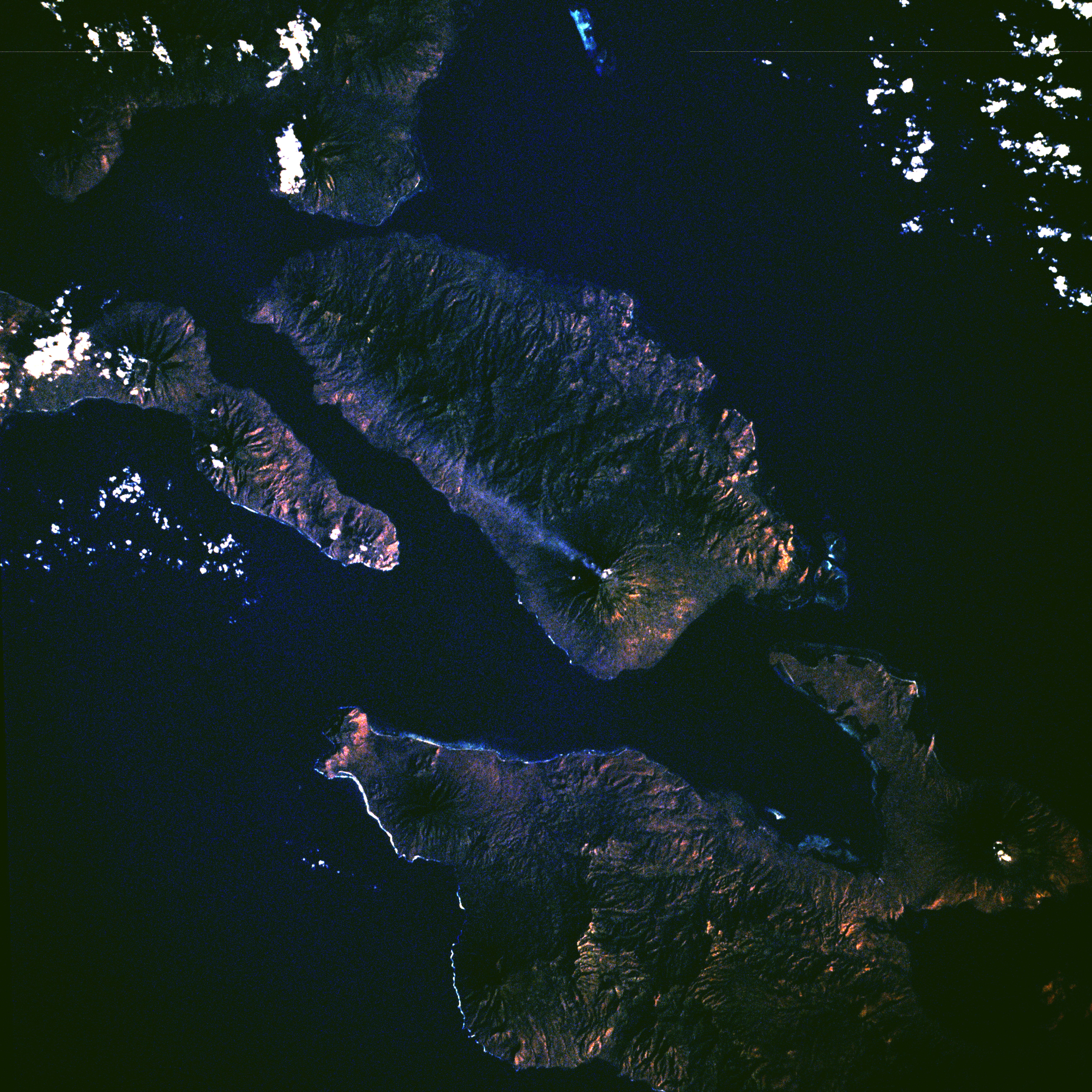
Space Shuttle Photograph of Solor Archipelago

The Solor Archipelago (Indonesian: Kepulauan Solor; Indonesian pronunciation: [kəpuˌlawan ˈsɔlɔr]) is a group of islands in the Lesser Sunda Islands, Indonesia, lying to the east of Flores and the west of the Alor Strait and the Alor Archipelago. To the north is the west part of the Banda Sea, while to the south across the Savu Sea lies the island of Timor. The largest islands are, from west to east, Solor, Adonara, and Lembata (formerly known as Lomblen), although there are many small islands as well.

Administratively, the islands of Solor and Adonara are included within the East Flores Regency, while Lembata (with smaller offshore islands) forms its regency (kabupaten), the Lembata Regency. Both regencies lie within the province of East Nusa Tenggara. The islands are listed below with their areas and their populations at the 2010 Census and the 2020 Census, and according to the official estimates for mid-2024, together with the number of administrative districts (kecamatan) on each island.

Name	Area in km^{2}	Population Census 2010	Population Census 2020	Population Estimate mid 2024	Number of districts
Solor Island	226.34	27,041	34,029	36,739	3
Adonara Island	529.75	104,514	126,469	134,396	8
Lembata Island	1,266.39	117,829	135,930	143,345	9
Totals	2,022.48	249,384	296,428	314,480	20

In addition to the national language of Indonesian, the population also speaks Lamaholot as a lingua franca. There are also many local languages, for example, Adonara which is spoken on Adonara and Solor.

On the South coast of Lembata, the village of Lamalera (pop. 2,500) is known for its hunting of sperm whales and other deep-sea species. This is allowed under International Whaling Commission regulations around aboriginal whaling but conservationists worry that commercial whaling is being carried out in the garb of aboriginal whaling. Lamalera and Lamakera (on the neighbouring island of Solor) are the last two remaining Indonesian whaling communities.
