= Lembata =

Island in Indonesia

Native name: Pulau Lembata
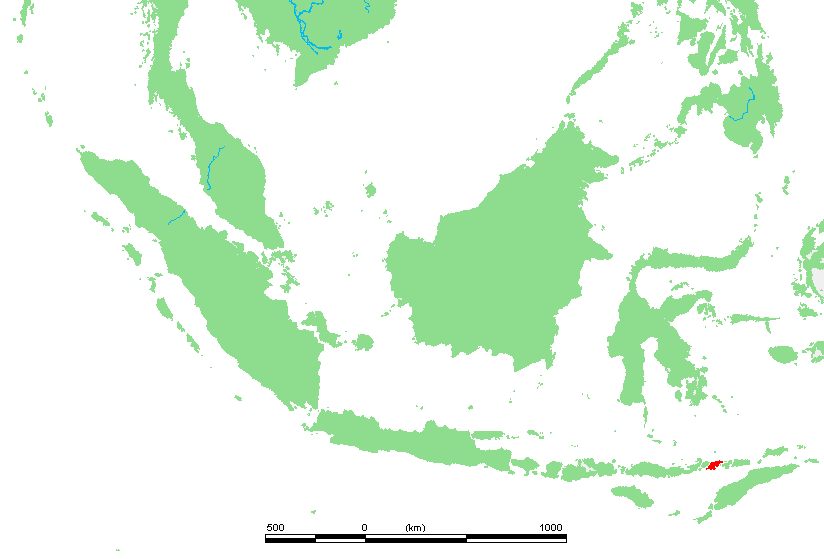
- Location in Indonesia

Geography
- Location: Lesser Sunda Islands
- Coordinates: 8.40°S 123.57°E
- Area: 1,266.39 km^{2} (488.96 sq mi)
- Highest elevation: 1,621 m (5318 ft)
- Highest point: Ile Labalekang

Administration
- Indonesia
- Province: East Nusa Tenggara
- Regency: Lembata Regency
- Largest settlement: Lewoleba (pop. 43,159)

Demographics
- Population: 143,345 (mid 2024 estimate)
- Pop. density: 113.2/km^{2} (293.2/sq mi)

Lembata is an island in the Lesser Sunda Islands, also known as Lomblen or Kawela; it is the largest island of the Solor Archipelago, in the Lesser Sunda Islands, Indonesia. It forms a separate regency of the province of Nusa Tenggara Timur. The island has a very irregular coastline with numerous bays and promontories, of which the largest is the Ile Ape peninsula on the island's north coast. The length of the island is about 80 km from the southwest to the northeast and the width is about 30 km from the west to the east. It rises to an elevation of 1,621 metres at Mount Ile Labalekang.

To the west lie the other islands in the archipelago, most notably Solor and Adonara in the East Flores Regency, and then the larger island of Flores. To the east is the Alor Strait, which separates this archipelago from the Alor Archipelago. To the south across the Savu Sea lies the island of Timor, while to the north the western branch of the Banda Sea separates it from Buton and the other islands of Southeast Sulawesi.

== Administration ==
The Lembata Regency includes the island of Lembata and three small offshore islands. It is sub-divided into nine districts (kecamatan), in turn sub-divided into 151 villages, of which 96 are situated on the coasts and 55 are inland; seven villages are categorised as urban, the others as rural.

== Geography ==
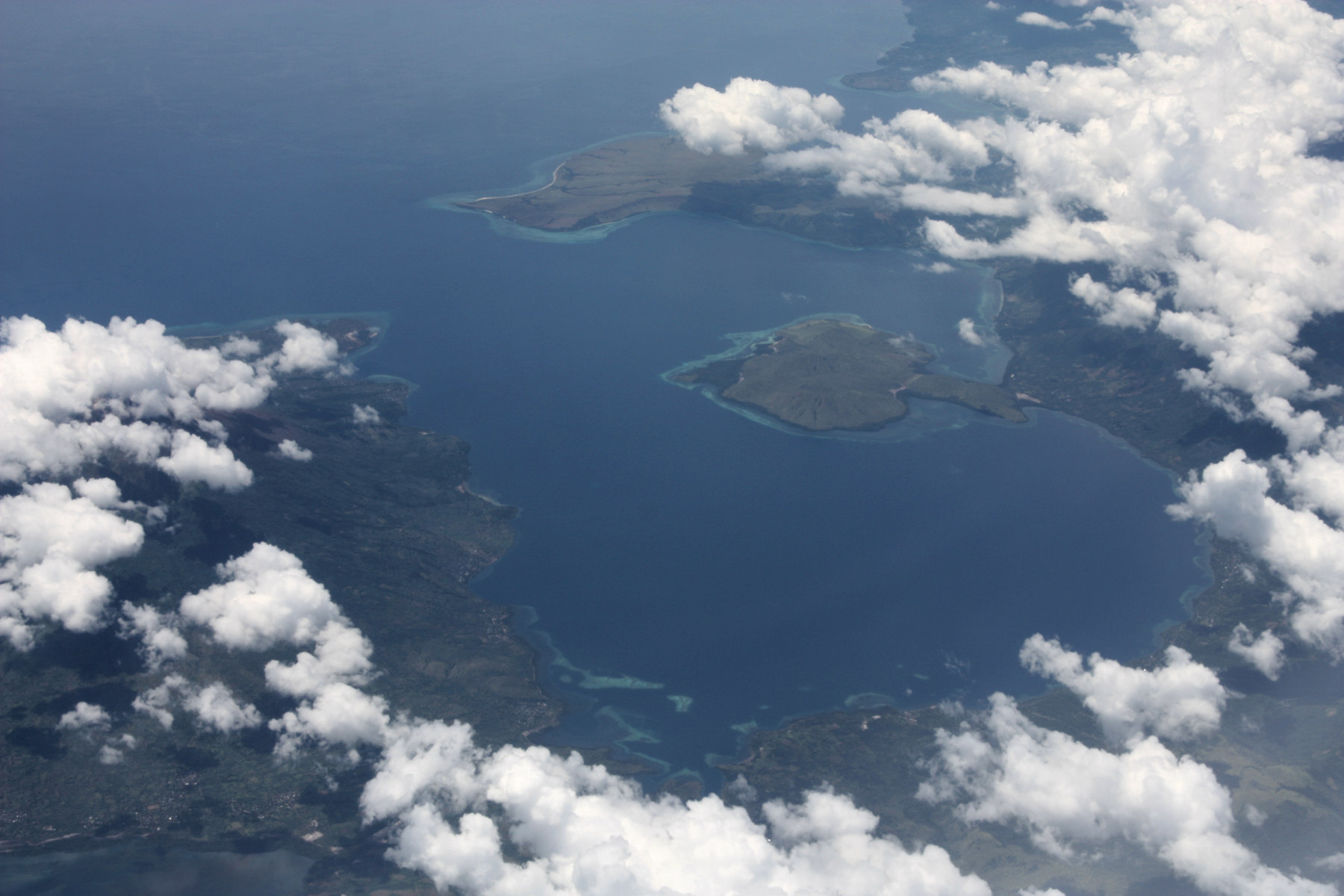
Teluk Waienga - protected bay of Lembata island

The capital city Lewoleba (also known as Labala) is found on the western part of the island next to a bay, across which lies Ile Lewotolok volcano to the north. Ships frequently connect the coastal towns and surrounding islands, but the only large harbour exists at Lewoleba on the north coast of the island. From Lewoleba there are daily connections to Larantuka (on Flores), and Waiwerang (on the neighbouring island of Adonara).

Like the other Lesser Sunda Islands, and indeed much of Indonesia, Lembata is volcanically active. It has three major volcanoes, Ililabalekan, Iliwerung, and Lewotolo.

== History ==
The south part of Lembata was the site of the state of Labala.

== People ==
The people of Lembata are, like many other inhabitants of Eastern Indonesia, famous for their handmade ikat weavings.

The national language, Indonesian, is known by many people of all ages, but like on other islands the national language coexists with many local languages. The most widespread and most widely understood of these is probably Lamaholot (another lingua franca inside the Solor archipelago). Lamaholot is spoken as a native language on Eastern Flores and Western Solor, and is itself divided into ten or more sublanguages (and many more dialects). It is spoken by 150.000 or more people in the region. Some of those sublanguages are indeed very distinct from Lamaholot, i.e. the Atadei language of Atadei District (Kecamatan Atadei), which again is subclassified as Eastern and Western Atadei, the former being spoken in Atalojo for example, the latter in Kalikasa. A very distinct language spoken in the eastern part of the island is Kedang.

On the south coast of Lembata, the village of Lamalera (pop. 2,500) is known for its hunting of sperm whale and other deep-sea species. The hunting has been taking place for at least six centuries, and is allowed under International Whaling Commission regulations concerning aboriginal whaling. However, conservationists worry that commercial whaling also takes place, and that hunters use their engine-powered boats all year round to catch other protected species such as manta rays, orcas (Orcinus orca), dolphins and oceanic sharks. Lamalera and Lamakera (on the neighbouring island of Solor) are the last two remaining Indonesian whaling communities.

== Environment ==
In 2011, the Indonesian Institute of Sciences (LIPI) found two rare coral reef fish in the Lamalera Sea; they were Yellow-fin fairy wrasse (Cirrhilabrus flavidorsalis) and swallowtail hawkfish (Cyprinocirrhites polyactis), which only exist in waters surrounding Indonesia and the Philippines.

The two species were the first to be found in Lamalera Sea, but similar types have been found near Bali before. The fish were only found in seas with good coral reefs, although traces of bombing had been found around the coral reefs in the Lamalera Sea, but it was not serious yet.

In February 2016, a new species of flasher wrasse, Paracheilinus alfiani, was described from a holotype collected from the reef around Lembata.
