= Sorghum production in Indonesia =

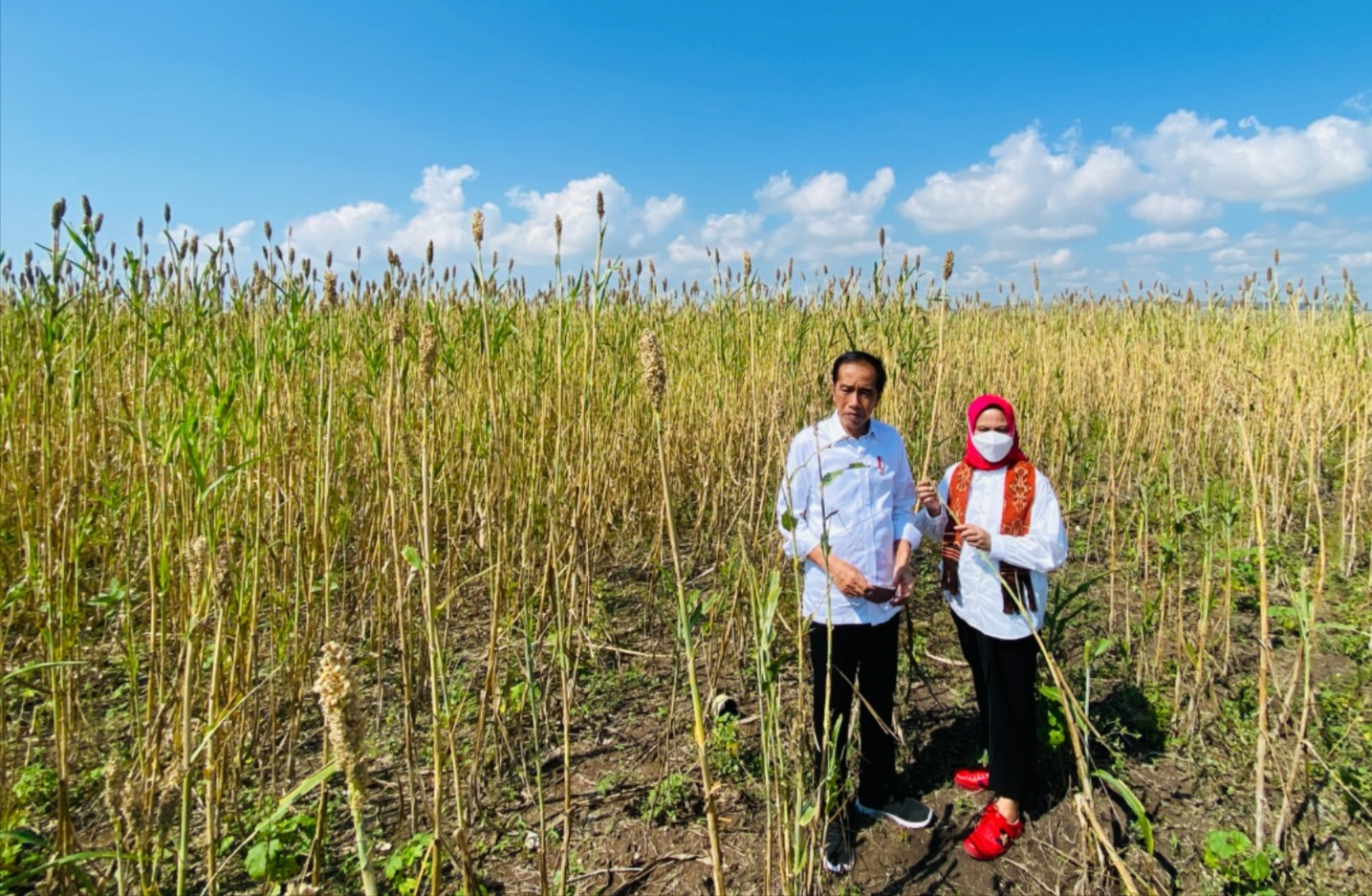
Joko Widodo in a sorghum field, 2022.

Sorghum is cultivated at a small scale in Indonesia, with the crop being concentrated in the East Nusa Tenggara region. Although the crop held historical importance, it was largely displaced by the promotion of rice cultivation in the late twentieth century. Since the 2000s, efforts have been made by local activists and later by the government to reintroduce the production of sorghum in some areas to increase local food security. Aside from local consumption, sorghum is used in some cases as a wheat substitute.

== History ==
Linguistic analysis suggested that sorghum cultivation was introduced to modern-day Indonesia from India between 1,000 and 600 BC, roughly the same time period as the introduction of foxtail millet from China. According to the botanist Georg Eberhard Rumphius, writing in the seventeenth century, sorghum was grown "everywhere in the East Indies". It was usually planted at the edges of rice or corn fields, and the grains were not commonly used as food for people and was instead eaten by birds. It was also planted as part of a crop rotation, with rice in one planting season and sorghum along a mix of various other food crops in another. Although sorghum was not popular as a crop in Java, it was widely cultivated in the East Nusa Tenggara region. Even there, sorghum was overshadowed by corn which took on the word for sorghum in many local languages.

During the New Order period in the 1970s, the Government of Indonesia began promoting rice cultivation nationwide. In places like East Nusa Tenggara, sorghum cultivation persisted until the 1980s when it was widely replaced by rice fields along with various other local crops. The region largely became a major rice importer, being unable to produce enough rice for local consumption.

=== Recent years ===
By 2007, local activists slowly had begun reintroducing sorghum cultivation in East Nusa Tenggara, e.g. by Maria Loretha in East Flores. Loretha established a foundation to promote sorghum cultivation in 2014, developing the village of Kawalelo in East Flores as a model for sorghum agriculture. The local governments of East Flores and East Nusa Tenggara also passed several laws promoting the development of the crop. Other activists also promoted sorghum cultivation in other regions, e.g. in West Nusa Tenggara, East Java, and in the Bangka Belitung Islands. Sorghum is promoted as a more drought-resilient crop to combat the effects of climate change, which had increased the frequency of harvest failures of other crops.

In 2022, following a spike in world wheat prices due to the Russian invasion of Ukraine, the Indonesian government began to look to sorghum as a partial substitute for wheat in the production of flour. It was particularly promoted on the island of Sumba. Food manufacturer Indofood began conducting research into sorghum-based products, generally mixing 20 to 30 percent sorghum flour into wheat flour. In November 2025, agriculture minister Amran Sulaiman announced that the ministry would trial large-scale sorghum production in 5,000 hectares of land in Java and East Nusa Tenggara.

== Statistics ==
In 2023, the National Research and Innovation Agency reported that the annual production of sorghum in Indonesia was around 10 thousand tonnes, cultivated on around 4 thousand hectares of land. Most of the land used for sorghum cultivation was in East Nusa Tenggara (with 3,400 hectares) with a further ~800 hectares used for sorghum in Java.
