= Alor Strait =

Strait in Indonesia

- Selat Alor (Indonesian)
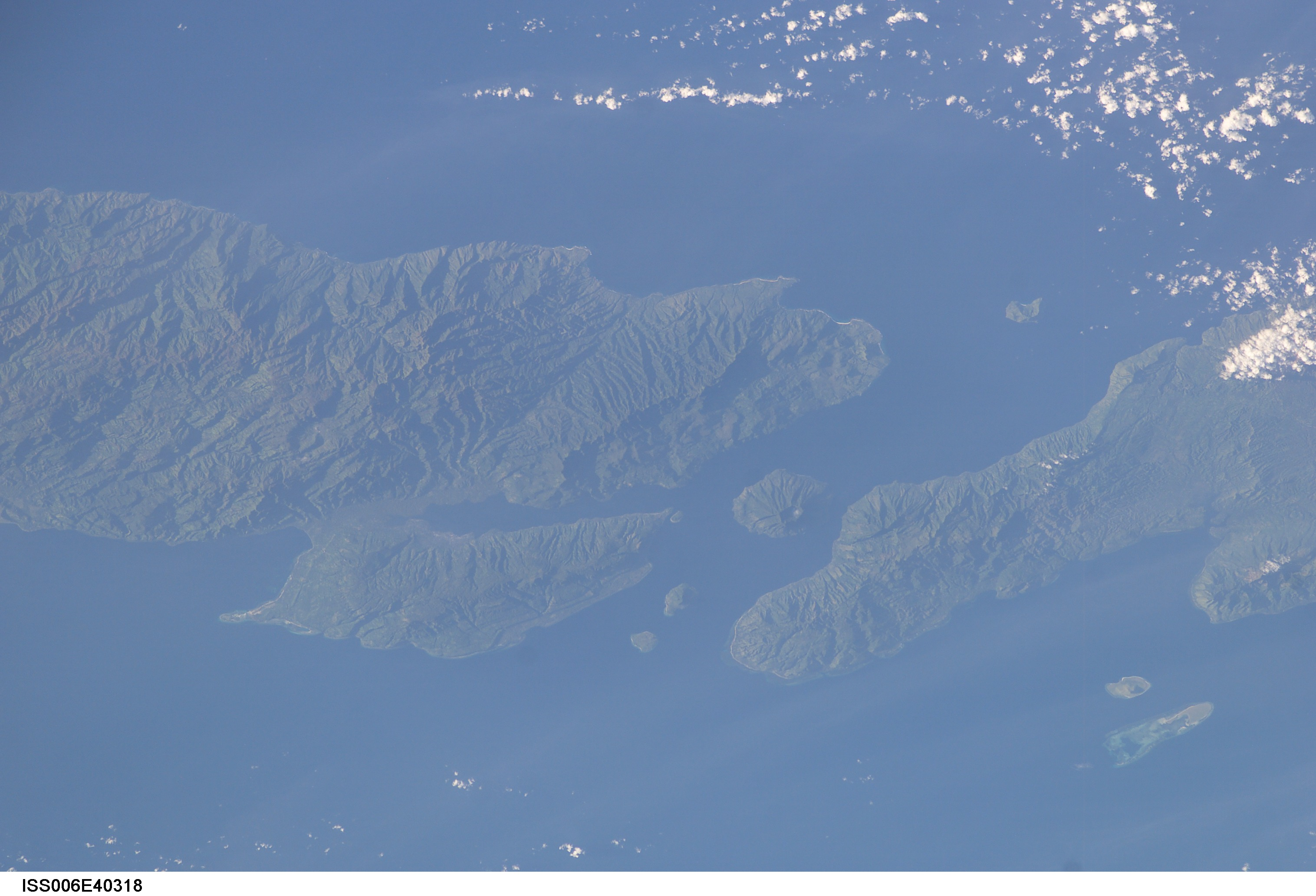
- Alor Strait seen from the International Space Station

- Location within Lesser Sunda Islands
- Coordinates: 8°20′00″S 123°48′00″E
- Type: strait
- Basin countries: Indonesia
- References: Selat Alor: Indonesia National Geospatial-Intelligence Agency, Bethesda, MD, USA

Alor Strait (also Alloo Strait) divides the Solor Archipelago from the Alor Archipelago, in the Lesser Sunda Islands of Indonesia. It lies mainly between the larger islands of Pantar and Lembata. The strait connects the western part of the Banda Sea in the north to the Savu Sea in the south.
