= Adonara =

Island in the Lesser Sunda islands, Indonesia

Coordinates: 8°15′S 123°09′E

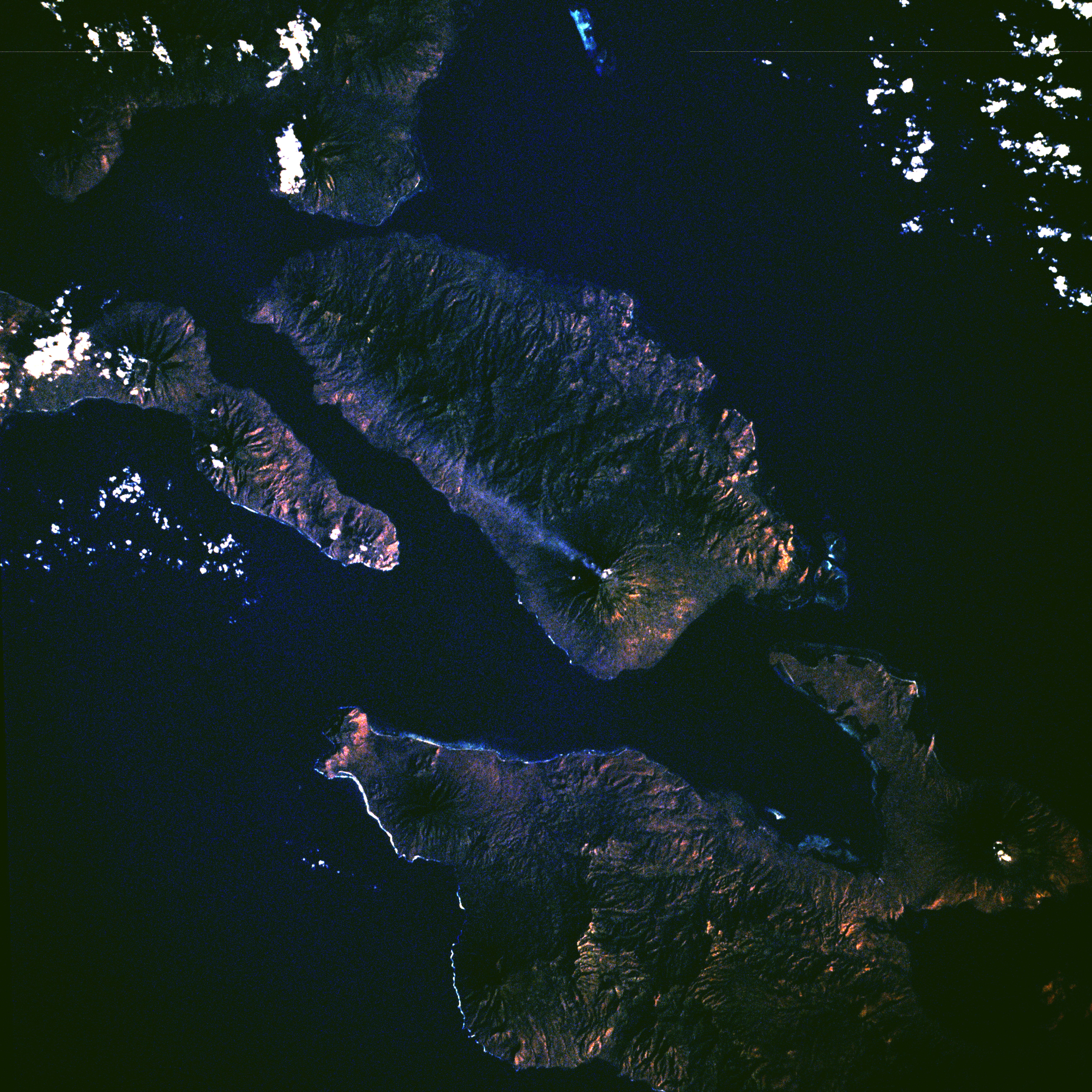
- Adonara, viewed from the Space Shuttle, 1983. Solor Island appears to the left and Lembata Island is below Adonara, while part of Flores Island appears above Adonara. The eruption plume from stratovolcano Iliboleng is visible.

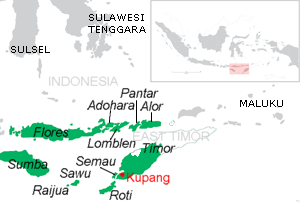

Geography
- Location: Lesser Sunda Islands
- Archipelago: Solor Archipelago
- Area: 529.75 km^{2} (204.54 sq mi)
- Highest elevation: 1,659 m (5443 ft)

Administration
- Indonesia
- Province: East Nusa Tenggara
- Largest settlement: Waiwerang

Demographics
- Population: 136,538 (mid 2025 estimate)
- Pop. density: 257.7/km^{2} (667.4/sq mi)
- Ethnic groups: Lamaholot

Adonara (Indonesian pronunciation: [adoˈnara]) is an island in the Lesser Sunda Islands of Indonesia, located east of the much larger island of Flores. Further to the east lies Lembata, formerly known as Lomblen, while to the south is Solor Island; the three islands together form the Solor Archipelago. Adonara is the highest of the islands of the archipelago, reaching an altitude of 1,659 metres, and it has an area of 529.75 km^{2}. It is situated administratively in the East Flores Regency of East Nusa Tenggara province.

== Etymology ==
The name Adonara is a combination of two words from the Lamaholot language (which includes the Adonara language), namely Ado and nara. Ado refers to the name of the first man who inhabited Adonara Island, Kelake Ado Pehan, while nara means village, nation, or kin group. Literally, Adonara means “the village of Ado,” “the people of Ado,” or “the descendants and relatives of Ado.”

Another interpretation suggests that the name comes from two Lamaholot words: adok and nara. Adok means to provoke or incite fighting, and nara means siblings. Based on this meaning, Adonara can be interpreted literally as “inciting siblings to fight” or “making relatives fight each other.”

Because of this, Ernst Vatter referred to Adonara as the “island of killers.” This view is considered reasonable, as conflicts between relatives and wars between villages over land were historically common on Adonara.

== Administration ==
The island is divided into eight districts (kecamatan), tabulated below with their areas (in km^{2}) and their populations at the 2010 Census and 2020 census, together with the official estimates as at mid 2025.

Kode Wilayah	Name of District (kecamatan)	Area in km^{2}	Pop'n Census 2010	Pop'n Census 2020	Pop'n Estimate mid 2025	Admin centre	No. of villages	Post codes
53.06.08	Adonara Barat (West Adonara)	79.71	11,743	13,529	14,256	Waiwadan	18	86263
53.06.09	Wotan Ulu Mado	86.31	7,871	9,968	10,996	Baniona	12	86260
53.06.18	Adonara Tengah (Central Adonara)	42.73	10,686	13,312	14,568	Lewobele	13	86264
53.06.10	Adonara Timur ^{(a)} (East Adonara)	91.06	26,161	30,299	32,010	Waiwerang	21 ^{(b)}	86261
53.06.13	Ile Boleng	49.30	13,948	17,416	19,081	Senadan	21	86253
63.06.12	Witihama	79.43	14,140	17,460	19,026	Oringbele	16	86266
53.06.11	Kelubagolit	44.41	10,210	12,650	13,807	Pepak Kelu	12	86265
53.06.17	Adonara ^{(c)}	56.80	9,745	11,835	12,794	Sagu	8	86262
	Totals on Adonara Island	529.75	104,504	126,469	136,538		121	

Note: (a) Adonara Timur District, notwithstanding its name, actually occupies the south-central part of Adonara Island, with Wotan Ulu Mado District to the southwest and Ile Boleng District to the southeast.
(b) including the two kelurahan of Lamatewelu and Waiwerang Kota.
(c) Adonara District covers only the north-central part of Adonara Island ("Adonara Utara"), with Kelubagolit and Witihama Districts to the east and Adonara Barat and Adonara Tengah Districts to the west.

== History ==
Local history on Adonara is documented from the sixteenth century, when Portuguese traders and missionaries established a post on the nearby island of Solor. By that time Adonara and the surrounding islands were ritually divided between a population of coastal dwellers known as Paji, and a population mainly settling the mountainous inland called Demon. The Paji were susceptible to Islam, while the Demon tended to fall under Portuguese influence. The Paji areas on Adonara contained three principalities, namely Adonara proper (centered on the north coast of the island), and Terong and Lamahala (on the south coast). Together with two principalities on Solor (Lohayong and Lamakera), they constituted a league called Watan Lema ("the five shores"). The Watan Lema allied with the Dutch East India Company (VOC) in 1613, confirmed in 1646. The Adonara principalities had frequent feuds with the Portuguese in Larantuka on Flores, and were not always obedient to the Dutch authorities. In the course of the nineteenth century, the ruler of Adonara (proper) in the north strengthened his position in the Solor Archipelago; by then, he was also the overlord of parts of eastern Flores and Lembata. The Demon areas stood under the suzerainty of the principality of Larantuka, which in turn was under Portuguese rule until 1859, when it was ceded to the Netherlands. The principalities of Larantuka and Adonara (proper) were abolished by the Indonesian government in 1962. Some post-independence local officials trace their roots to past rulers, called raja, of Adonara (proper). These include:

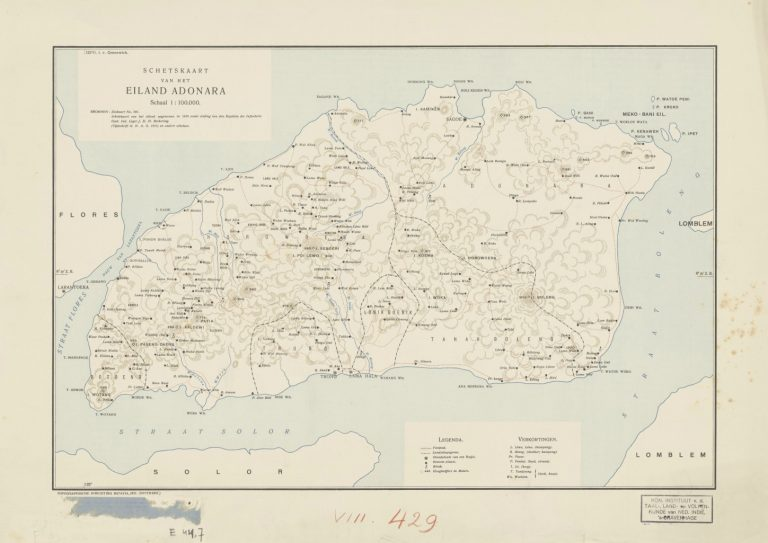
A map of Adonara made in 1911

- Foramma, c. 1650
- Boli I, c. 1671–1684
- Eke 1684–1688 (killed by mountain people)
- Gogok, c. 1702
- Wuring (brother of Eke), 1688–1719
- Boli II (son of Wuring), 1719-after 1756
- unknown rulers
- Jou, c. 1815
- Lakabella Jou (son of Jou), c. 1832
- Begu, d. July 28, 1850 (killed)
- Pela(ng) (son of Begu), 1850–1857
- Jou (brother of Pela), 1857–1868
- Kamba Begu (brother of Lakabella), 1868–1893
- Bapa Tuan (son of Kamba Begu), temporary Raja in 1893 for 6 months
- Arkiang Kamba (Arakang; brother of Bapa Tuan, b. 1866), 1893 or 1894 – abdicated December 18, 1930
- Bapa Ana (son of a sister of Kamba Begu), Regent with the title of Kapitan 1930 – December 1, 1935, condemned to life imprisonment 1935 and sent to Kupang
- Bapa Nuhur, (son of Gela, a son of Bapa Tuan, b. 1915), 1941–1947
- Bapa Kaya, (son of Bapa Ana, d. 12/1/1954), Regent 1947–1951
- Mohamad Eke (great-grandson of Raja Jo, 1929 – c. 1985), 1951–1962, first referred as Government Asst during Bapa Kaya's rule and also Kapitan of Adonara

== Geography ==
Adonara Island is a part of the Indonesian regency of East Flores. It can be reached by airplane from Jakarta to Kupang, then by ferry to Larantuka, then by boat.

The town of Waiwerang and its neighbouring desa (villages) of Lamahala Jaya and Terong to the west and Waiburak to the east form the only urban area on Adonara. There is no single administrative centre on the island, as each district has its own centre, all subservient to the regency administration at Larantuka on Flores island.
