= Larantuka =

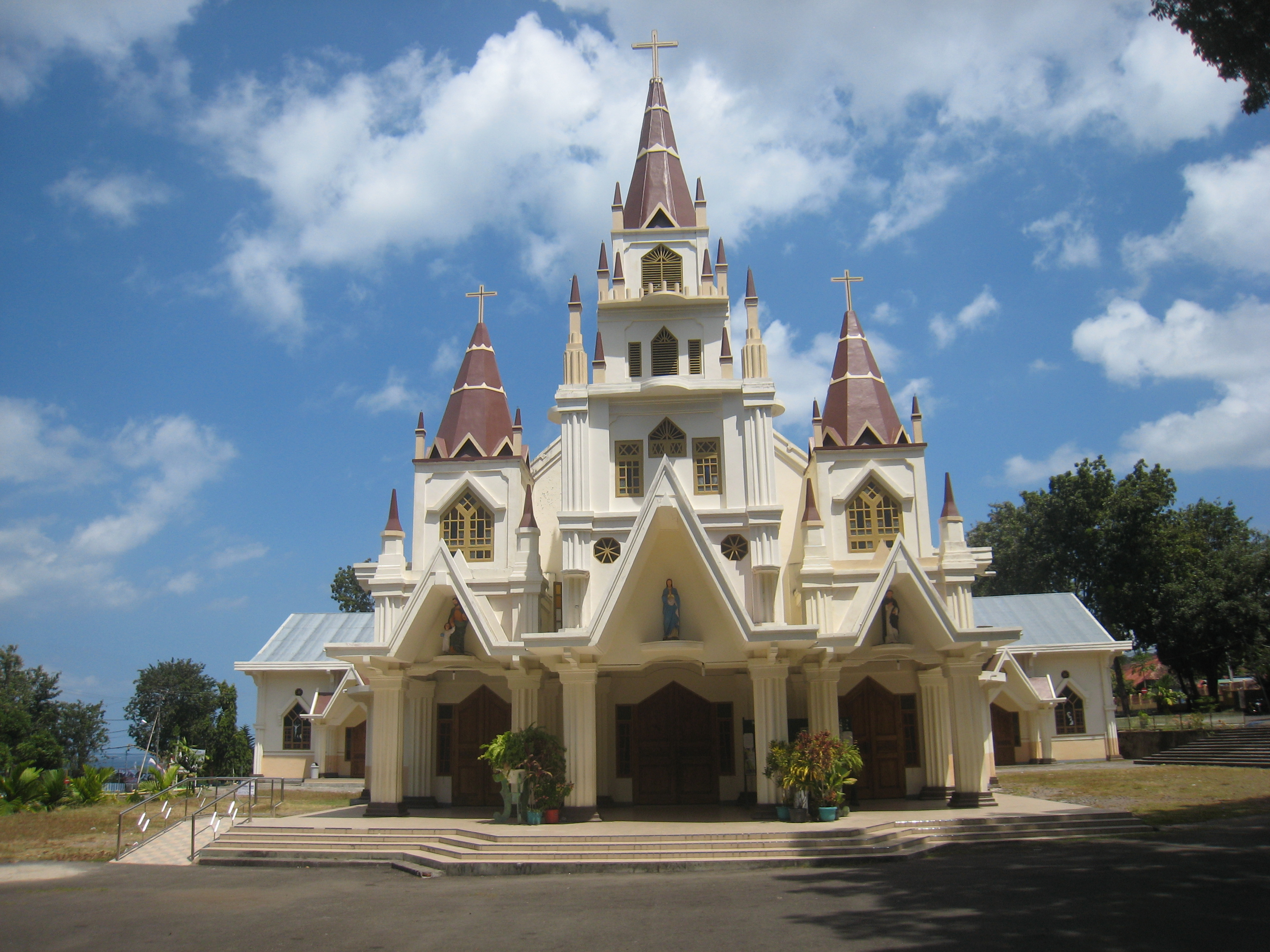
- The Catholic Larantuka Cathedral, Indonesia

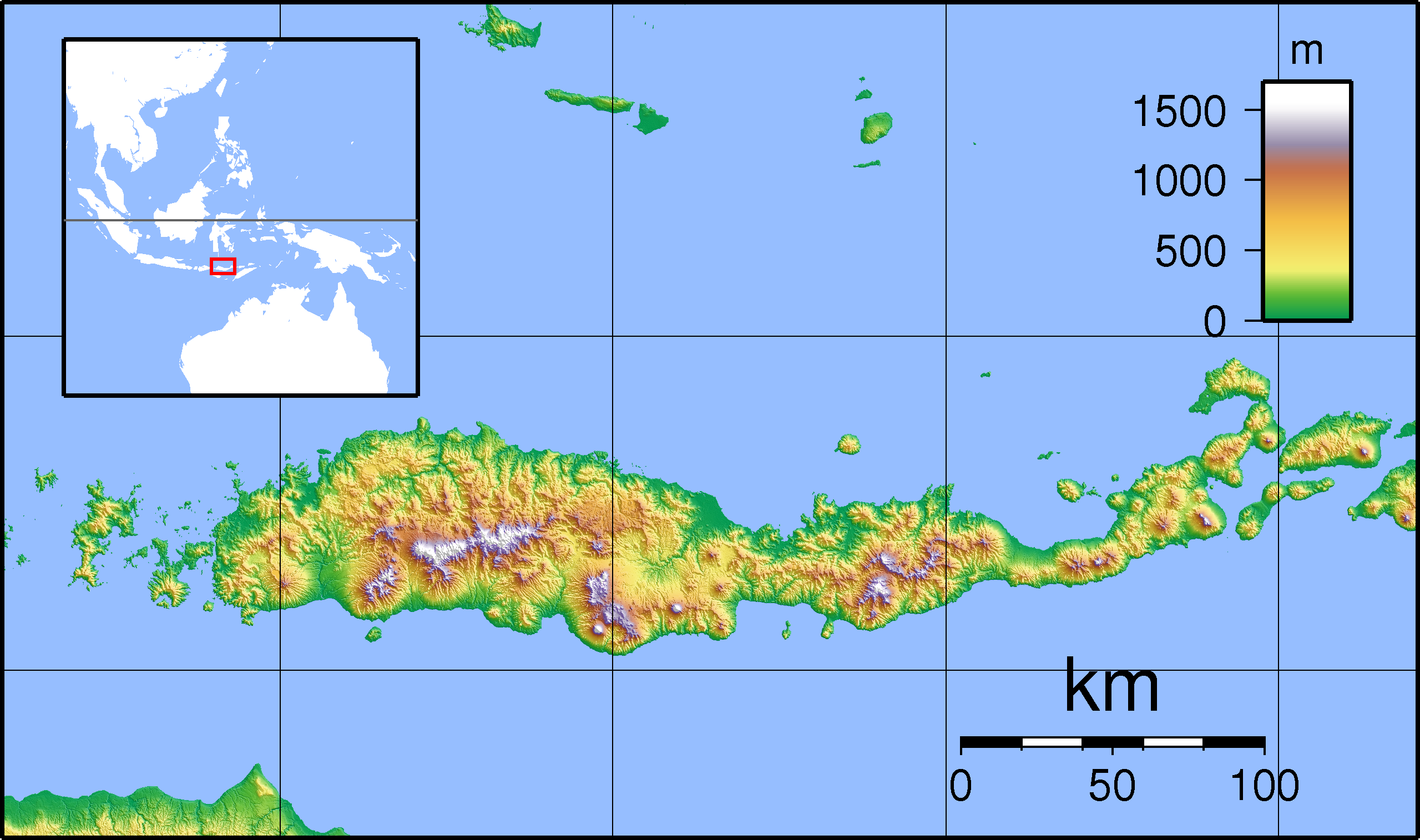
- Location in Indonesia Larantuka (Indonesia)
- Country: Indonesia
- Region: Lesser Sunda Islands
- Province: East Nusa Tenggara
- Regency: East Flores

Area
  - Total: 67.77 km^{2} (26.17 sq mi)

Population (mid 2025 estimate)
  - Total: 41,973
  - Density: 619.3/km^{2} (1,604/sq mi)
- Time zone: UTC+8 (WITA)

Larantuka (Dutch: Larantoeka, Portuguese: Larantuca) is a kecamatan (district) and the seat of East Flores Regency, on the eastern end of Flores Island, East Nusa Tenggara, Indonesia. Like much of the region, Larantuka has a strong colonial Portuguese influence. The town (including the two rural villages within the administrative district) covers a land area of 67.77 km^{2}, and had 37,348 inhabitants at the 2010 census and 40,828 at the 2020 census; the official estimate as at mid 2025 was 41,973 - comprising 20,840 males and 21,133 females. This overwhelmingly (95.4%) Roman Catholic area enjoys some international renown for its Holy Week celebrations.

== Language ==
Larantuka Malay (similar to Ende Malay), a local dialect over 80% cognate with Indonesian, is used as a lingua franca in this area. Portuguese is used in certain Catholic religious rituals.

== Communities ==
Larantuka District comprises eighteen urban villages (kelurahan) and two rural villages (desa), listed below with their areas and their populations as officially estimated for mid 2025, together with their postcodes.

Kode Wilayah	Name of kelurahan or desa	Area in km^{2}	Pop'n Estimate mid 2025	Post code
53.06.03.2019	Mokantarak (desa)	12.37	1,587	86219
53.06.03.2020	Lamawalang (desa)	4.50	1,092	86219
53.06.03.1001	Waibalun	7.88	3,050	86212
53.06.03.1002	Lewoleri	1.68	2,335	86212
53.06.03.1003	Pantai Besar	4.50	1,394	86213
53.06.03.1004	Larantuka (kelurahan)	5.62	1,292	86213
53.06.03.1005	Balela	1,68	1,165	86214
53.06.03.1006	Pohon Sirih	1.40	739	86214
53.06.03.1007	Lohayong	2.82	703	86215
53.06.03.1008	Lokea	1.68	1,540	86215
53.06.03.1009	Postoh	2.82	1,889	86216
53.06.03.1010	Amagarapati	1.68	2,599	85219
53.06.03.1011	Ekasapta	2.82	3,864	86217
53.06.03.1014	Puken Tobi Wangi Bao	0.84	3,105	86219
53.06.03.1012	Sarotari	5.83	3,042	86219
53.06.03.1013	Weri	2.17	3,326	86219
53.06.03.1022	Pohon Bao	1.05	1,257	86219
53.06.03.1021	Waihali	2.45	3,265	86219
53.06.03.1023	Sarotari Tengah (Central Sarotari)	1.84	2,891	86219
53.06.03.1024	Sarotari Timur (East Sarotari)	2.14	1,838	86219
53.06.03	Totals	67.77	41,973	

The main part of the town is situated along the eastern and southern coasts of the promontory created by Mount Ile Mandiri (which rises to a height of 1,510 m), and thus on the lower slopes of that mountain. The western and northern slopes of the mountain lies in adjacent Ile Mandiri District - which physically separates Larantuka on the landward side from the rest of Flores Island. Of the two rural desa, Mokantarak desa is an exclave which is separated (by part of Ile Mandiri District) from the rest of Larantuka District, and by the waters of the Solor Strait (Selat Solor) and Larantuka Strait (Selat Larantuka) which separate Flores from Solor and Adonara islands, while Lamawalang desa lies at the western end of the built-up area of the town (and thus beyond the eighteen kelurahan).

== History ==
Briefly before 1600 Portuguese traders left Solor and settled in Larantuka. The traders conflicted with the Dominicans in Solor because they were more interested in trade than in Christianization. In 1613 the Dutch occupied Solor and the Dominicans moved to Larantuka, too.

Larantuka was a nexus for the trade of sandalwood from Timor and became the Portuguese trading center of South East Indonesia. It was also a refuge for deserters of the Dutch East India Company (VOC).

Two waves of immigration brought additional population. As the Dutch conquered Malacca in 1641, many Portuguese moved to Larantuka. Two villages, Wureh and Konga, accommodated the new arrivals. As the Dutch attacked Makassar in 1660, most of the Portuguese from there also came to Larantuka.

The Portuguese took indigenous wives, but they always wrote down their Portuguese ancestry. This new population group was called Topasses, but they called themselves Larantuqueiros (inhabitants of Larantuka). The Dutch called them also Zwarte Portugeesen ("black Portuguese").

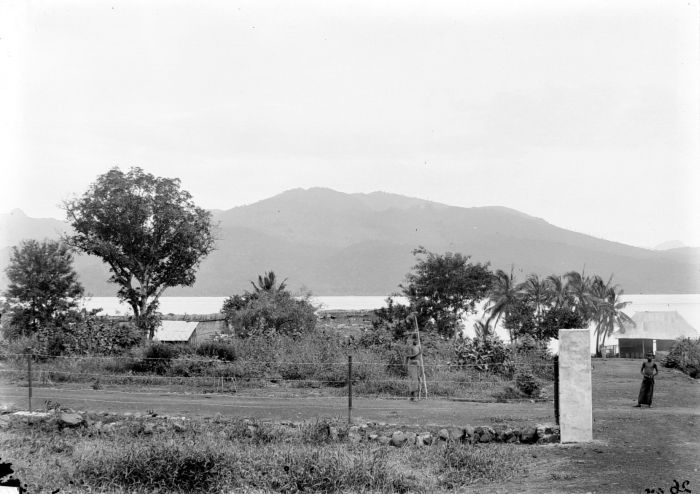
View from Larantoeka of the island Adonara

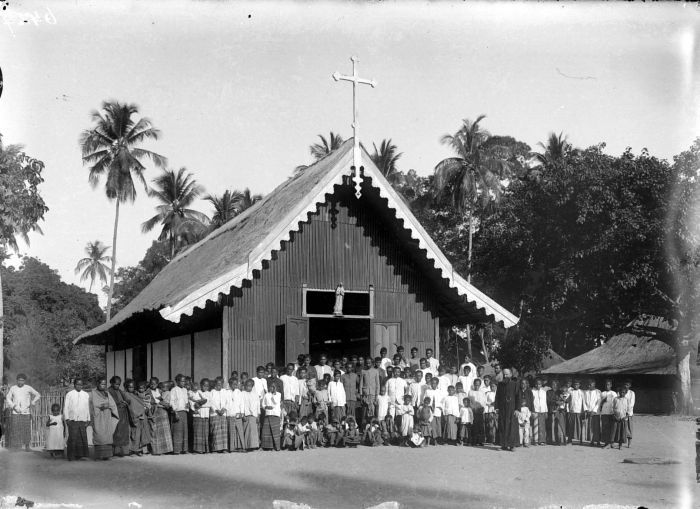
Group Portrait with missionary pastor J. van der Loo in front of the Roman Catholic church in Konga (circa 1915)

The Larantuqueiros turned out a loose, but mighty power in the region, whose influence reached far beyond the settlement. The core cell was the federation of Larantuka, Wureh, and Konga. Theoretically, they were subordinated to Portugal. But in practice they were free. They had no Portuguese administration and they did not pay taxes. Letters from the Lisbon government were ignored. For long years there was a bloody struggle for power between the families da Costa and de Hornay. In the end, they shared the power.

The Larantuqueiros made "alliances" with the indigenous people of Flores and Timor. They followed a certain strategy; the most notable raja was converted to Catholicism by military pressure. He had to take an oath of allegiance to the king of Portugal and thereon the title Dom was granted to him. The raja was allowed to rule his folk autonomously, but in war, he had to supply auxiliary forces.

The Larantuqueiros were the rulers and established Portuguese as the official language to distance themselves from the natives. The language of commerce was the Malay language, which was understood on the surrounding islands.

In 1640 the Larantuqueiros settled in Lifau on Timor to gain control over the sandalwood of Timor. From Lifau they expanded to the island's hinterland where sandalwood grows. With strong forces the sovereigns there were compelled to enter into negotiations. For the delivery of musketry, the Larantuqueiros gained control over most of the sandalwood production and were able to control the price.

Trade was flourishing when the “white Portuguese” came by order of the king of Portugal to exert influence, on Timor. But they were besieged by the Larantuqueiros and left empty-handed in 1769. In 1854 the Portuguese offered the Dutch the sovereign rights for sale. The contract was ratified in 1859.

The Dutch sent a military and administrative officer, who took residence in a small fort. But they do not influence the population.

Larantuka offered little promise, after the downturn of the sandalwood trade. The Larantuqueiros resorted to farming. Not much was left of the former profitable foreign trade.

Formally the Larantuqueiros were Catholics, but the control of the belief was devolved to laymen organisations, which gave the belief a new direction. In Larantuka the most powerful organisation was A Confraria da Rainha do Rosário, the brotherhood of the rosary queen, which exists still this day.

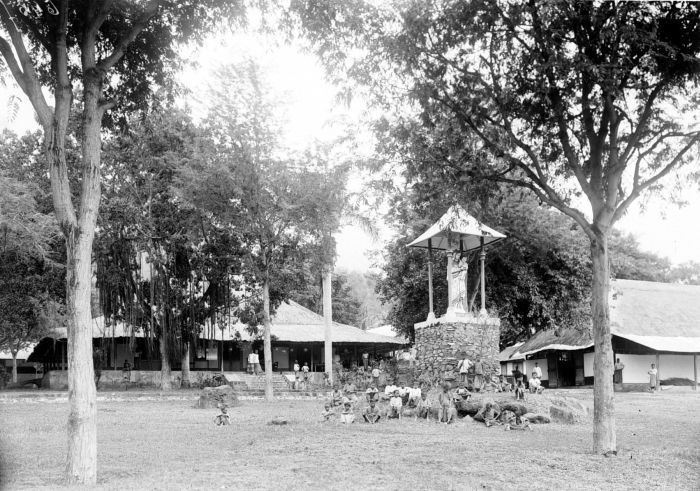
Children at a statue of Mary in the yard of the parsonage in Larantoeka (circa 1915)

The contract between the Portuguese and the Dutch respected religious freedom. Thus Dutch Calvinism did not take root. However, Dutch Jesuits engaged in missionary work. Starting in Larantuka by building the first rectory and reintroducing the orthodox form of Catholicism again. Monogamy was reinforced due to their influence. The missionaries even built Catholic schools and brought health care.

With the independence of Indonesia, the Larantuqueiros gained new influence. They were able to reach leading positions because they had a more high level of education than the natives. Even the standard Indonesian variety, which became the new official language, was easy for them because it is very similar to colloquial Malay.

== Present ==
Indonesia Tourism describes:

Larantuka is a neat clean seaport with a beautiful view. Everything is within walking distance except for the pier where the boats leave for Timor (4-5 km from town). [...Larantuka is a] little port nestled at the base of a tall hill at the eastern end of Flores, from where Solor, Adonara, and Lembata islands (the small islands nearby) are visible across the narrow strait. [...] people are very outgoing and friendly. Their bemos are brightly painted with murals on the sides and their radios are blasting the latest tunes. Lots of Catholic churches line the roads with a few mosques sprinkled in. [...] There are several tuna boats at the docks. They have a big square platform on the bow where fishermen line up with bamboo poles, flipping hooked tunas.

== Holy Week ==
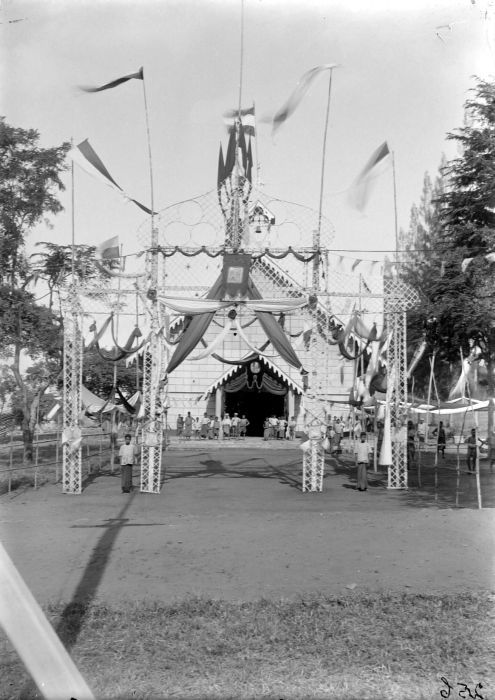
Celebratory decorations in front of the Roman Catholic Church during a public holiday in Larantoeka (early 20th century)

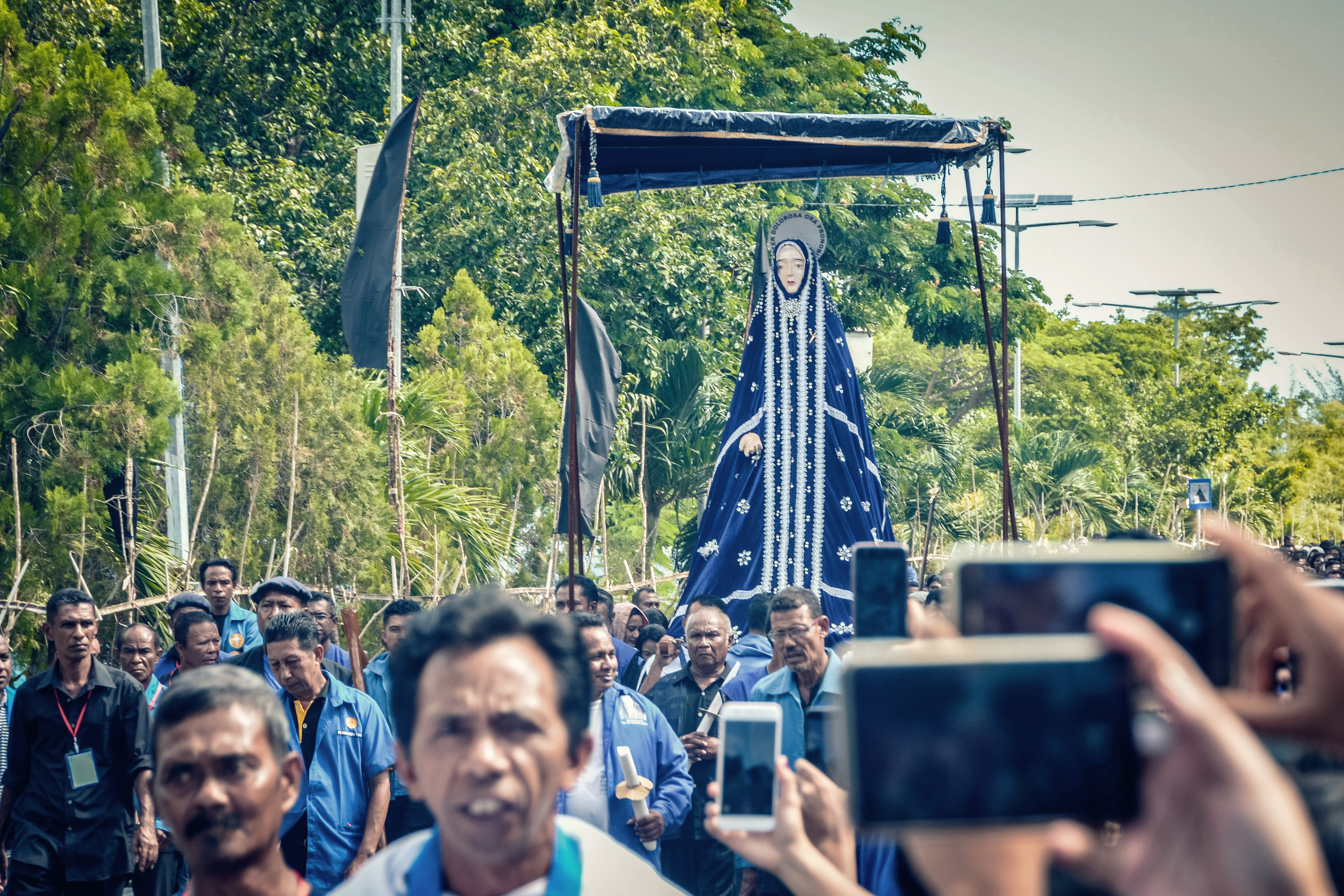
The statue of Tuan Ma is carried in a procession around the city of Larantuka during the celebration of Semana Santa

"Semana Santa" (Holy Week), the week before Easter, is an important time of religious celebration for the devoutly Catholic people of the Diocese of Larantuka. The celebrations center on two religious statues, one of Jesus Christ and one of the Virgin Mary brought by Portuguese missionaries Gaspar do Espírito Santo and Agostinho de Madalena in the 16th century. These statues are only presented to the public every Easter and are kept out of view for the rest of the year.

The religious festivities begin on the Wednesday before Easter, known locally as Rabu Trewa or "Shackled Wednesday" in remembrance of the betrayal of Judas Iscariot that led to Jesus's arrest and shackling. Devotees surround the chapel of Tuan Ana where the statue of Jesus is kept, shouting in Latin to mourn the arrest of Jesus by Roman soldiers. Devotees likewise surround the chapel of Tuan Ma in nearby Lohayong village where the statue of the Virgin Mary is kept.

On Holy Thursday, devotees enact the tikam turo ritual that prepares the route of the next day's seven-kilometer procession by planting candles along the road. After the candle is prepared, devotees attend the munda tuan ritual in which members of a religious fraternity known as the Konfreria Reinha Rosaria (Brotherhood of the Queen of Roses) bathe the statues of Jesus and Mary. The holy water used is afterward considered special and is saved to cure ill children and to help women having birth complications.

On the morning of Good Friday, the raja of Larantuka opens the door of the chapel of Tuan Ma thus making many for devotees to enter. His clan, the Diaz Vieira de Godinho, enter first followed by the brotherhood members and the rest of the population. Worshipers kiss the statue of Mary and pray for divine benevolence per Mariam ad Jesum (through Mary to Jesus).

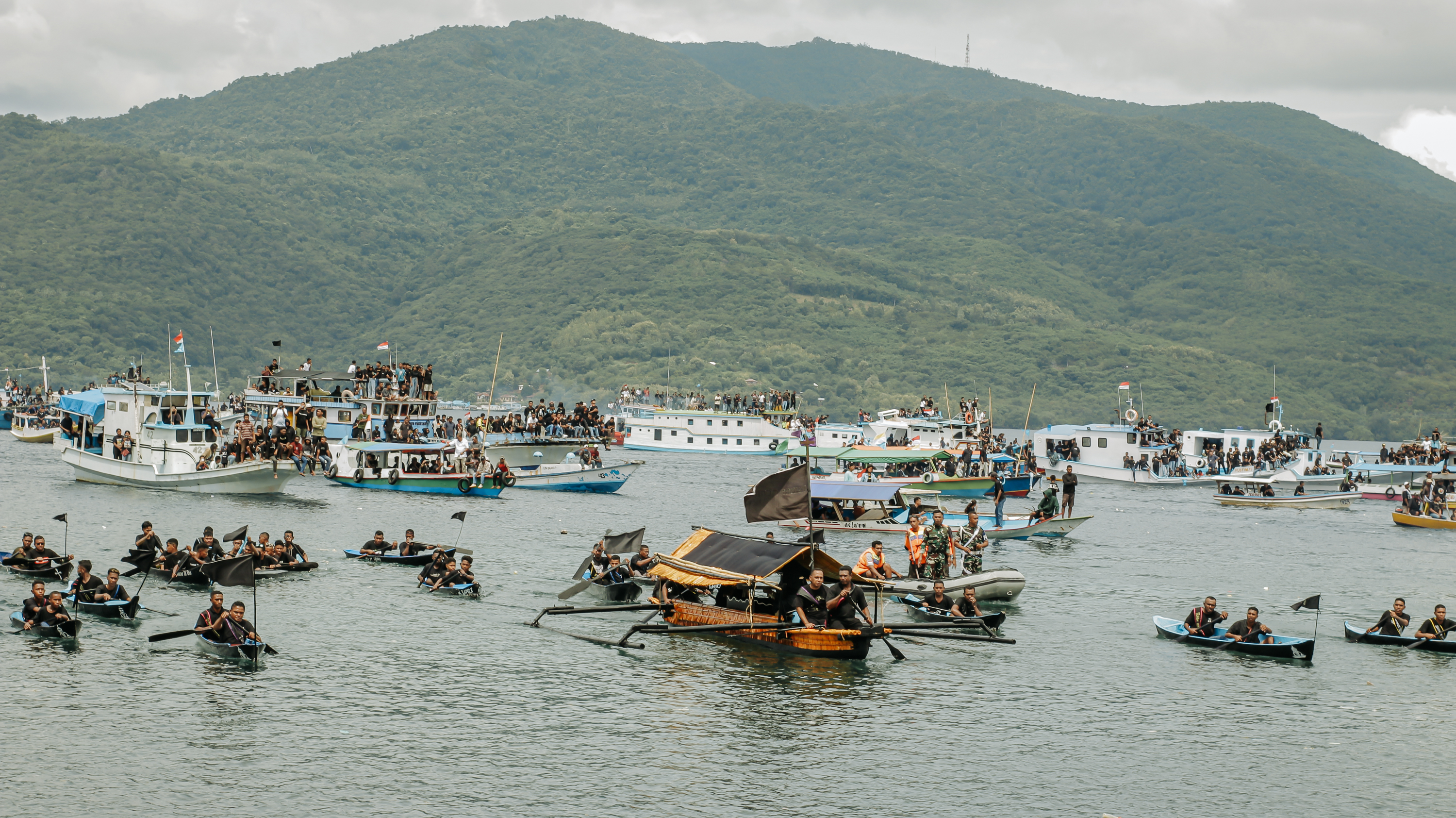
Catholics in Larantuka and pilgrims accompany Tuan Meninu, or the statue of the Infant Jesus, from the Rowido City Chapel to Kuce Beach, passing through the sea. During the sea procession, Tuan Meninu statue is carried on a traditional rowing boat, flanked by small boats

Meanwhile, the statue of Jesus is taken from the chapel in Larantuka and is brought on a seven-kilometer-long procession by land and sea. The procession has eight stops, each representing a major clan of Larantuka (among which are the Mulawato, Sarotari, Amakalen, Kapitan Jentera, Fernandez da Gomez, Diaz Pohon Sirih, and Diaz Vieira de Godinho clans). At each stop, there is a small chapel where a short prayer and devotional singing honor the suffering of the Passion. When the statues of Jesus and Mary are united, they are brought together to Larantuka Cathedral where many devotees attend a Good Friday service that lasts all night.

== Transportation ==
The area is served by Gewayantana Airport.

== Climate ==
Larantuka has a tropical savanna climate (Aw) with a long dry season and short wet season.

Climate data for Larantuka
Month	Jan	Feb	Mar	Apr	May	Jun	Jul	Aug	Sep	Oct	Nov	Dec	Year
Mean daily maximum °C (°F)	30.3 (86.5)	30.0 (86.0)	30.5 (86.9)	31.3 (88.3)	31.5 (88.7)	31.0 (87.8)	30.7 (87.3)	30.8 (87.4)	31.1 (88.0)	31.6 (88.9)	31.8 (89.2)	30.9 (87.6)	31.0 (87.7)
Daily mean °C (°F)	26.8 (80.2)	26.5 (79.7)	26.6 (79.9)	27.0 (80.6)	27.0 (80.6)	26.4 (79.5)	25.7 (78.3)	25.6 (78.1)	25.9 (78.6)	26.8 (80.2)	27.7 (81.9)	27.3 (81.1)	26.6 (79.9)
Mean daily minimum °C (°F)	23.4 (74.1)	23.1 (73.6)	22.8 (73.0)	22.7 (72.9)	22.5 (72.5)	21.8 (71.2)	20.7 (69.3)	20.4 (68.7)	20.8 (69.4)	22.1 (71.8)	23.7 (74.7)	23.8 (74.8)	22.3 (72.2)
Average rainfall mm (inches)	251 (9.9)	220 (8.7)	199 (7.8)	101 (4.0)	44 (1.7)	33 (1.3)	18 (0.7)	6 (0.2)	5 (0.2)	32 (1.3)	99 (3.9)	171 (6.7)	1,179 (46.4)
Source: Climate-Data.org

== See also ==
- Kingdom of Larantuka
