= East Flores Regency =

Regency in East Nusa Tenggara, Indonesia

East Flores Regency Kabupaten Flores Timur
- Regency
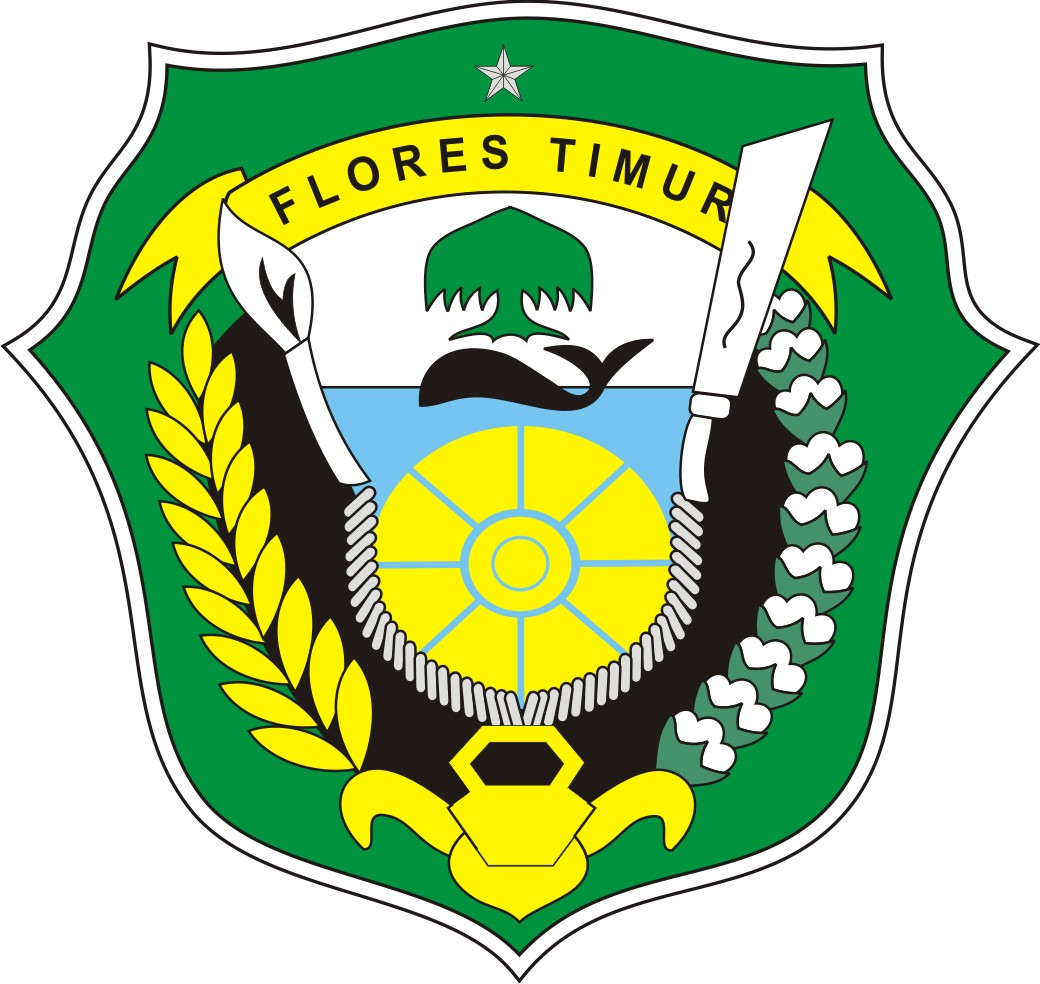
- Coat of arms

- Location within East Nusa Tenggara

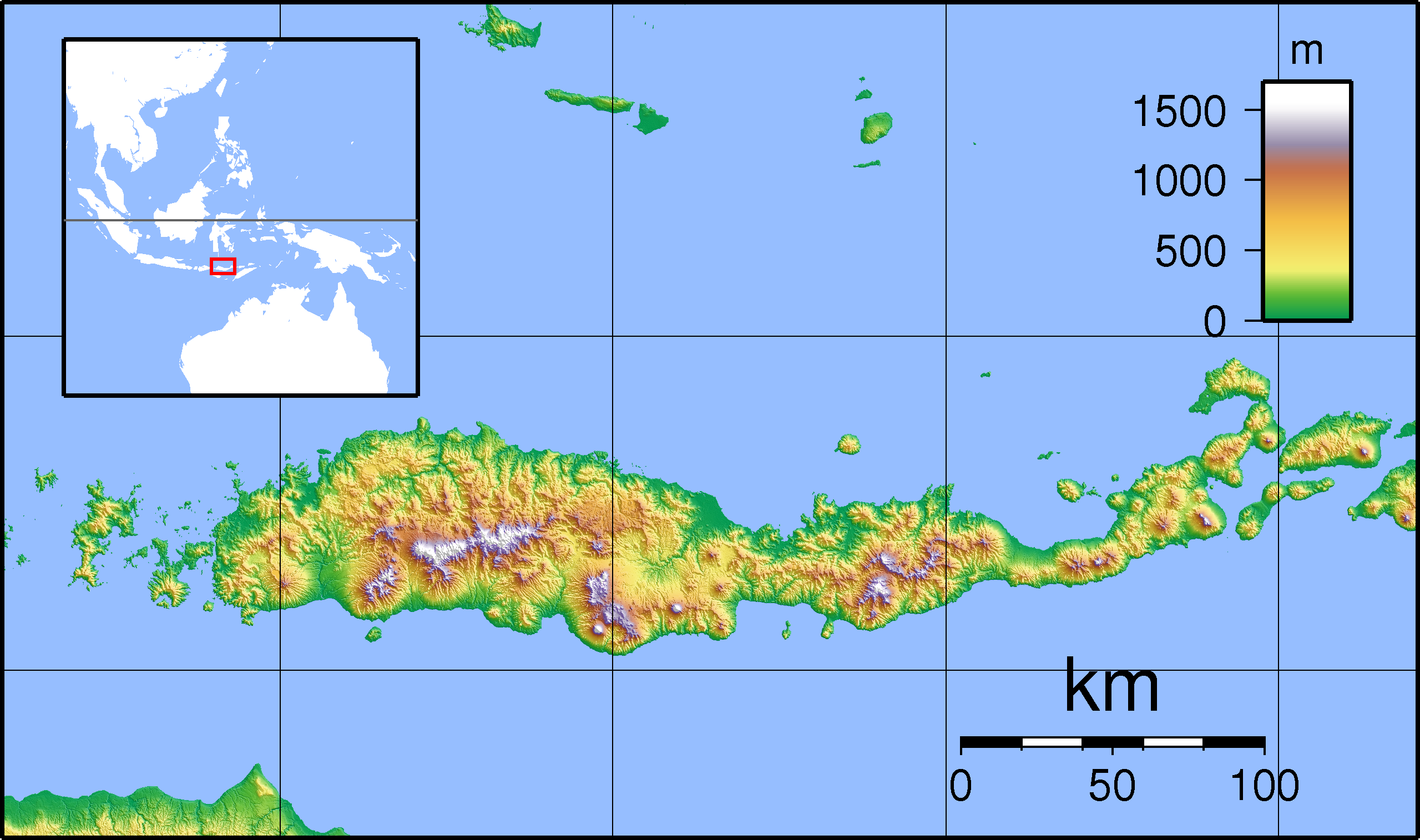
- Location in Flores, Lesser Sunda Islands and Indonesia East Flores Regency (Lesser Sunda Islands) East Flores Regency (Indonesia)
- Coordinates: 8.2422°S 122.9682°E
- Country: Indonesia
- Province: East Nusa Tenggara
- Capital: Larantuka

Government
  - Regent: Antonius Doni Dihen
  - Vice Regent: Ignasius Boli Uran

Area
  - Total: 1,812.58 km^{2} (699.84 sq mi)

Population (mid 2025 estimate)
  - Total: 296,760
  - Density: 163.72/km^{2} (424.04/sq mi)
- Time zone: UTC+8 (ICST)
- Area code: (+62) 383
- Website: florestimurkab.go.id

East Flores Regency (Indonesian: Kabupaten Flores Timur) is a regency in East Nusa Tenggara province of Indonesia. Established in 1958, the regency has its seat (capital) in Larantuka on Flores Island. The regency encompasses the eastern tip of the island of Flores, together with all of the adjacent islands of Adonara and Solor to the east of Flores (and both part of the Solor Archipelago), with some 14 much smaller (and uninhabited) offshore islands. On 4 October 1999, the island of Lembata (formerly called Lomblen) at the eastern end of the Solor Archipelago was separated from the East Flores Regency and formed into its own Regency.

The reduced regency covers a land area of 1,812.58 km^{2}, and it had a population of 232,605 as of the 2010 census and 276,896 at the 2020 Census; the official estimate as of mid 2025 was 296,760 (comprising 146,119 males and 150,641 females), and is projected to be over 301,000 in mid 2026.

== Economy ==
Since the 2010s, the local government and activists has promoted the cultivation of sorghum, which had previously been a major crop in the area but was displaced by rice cultivation during the 1970s and 1980s.

== Administration ==
The regency is divided into nineteen districts (kecamatan), tabulated below with their areas and their populations at the 2010 Census and the 2020 Census, together with the official estimates as of mid 2025. The table also includes the locations of the district administrative centres, the number of administrative villages in each district (totaling 229 rural desa and 21 urban kelurahan), and its postcode.

Kode Wilayah	Name of District (kecamatan)	Area in km^{2}	Pop'n Census 2010	Pop'n Census 2020	Pop'n Estimate mid 2025	Admin centre	No. of villages	Post codes
53.06.01	Wulanggitang	225.85	13,143	14,780	15,393	Boru	11	86256
53.06.02	Titehena	154.84	11,145	12,974	13,740	Lewolaga	14	86255
53.06.16	Ile Bura	118.32	6,165	7,517	8,141	Lewotobi	7	86254
53.06.05	Tanjung Bunga	257.57	11,880	14,184	15,207	Waiklibang	16	86251
53.06.15	Lewolema	92.84	7,951	9,694	10,499	Kawaliwu	7	86252
53.06.03	Larantuka (town)	48.91	37,348	40,828	41,944	Larantuka	20 ^{(a)}	86212 -86219
53.06.04	Ile Mandiri	72.76	9,145	11,506	12,653	Lewohala	8	86211
53.06.14	Demon Pagong	85.40	4,283	4,916	5,171	Lewokluok	7	86219
	Totals on Flores Island	1,056.49	101,060	116,398	122,748		90	
53.06.06	Solor Barat (West Solor)	128.20	9,321	11,180	12,013	Ritaebang	15 ^{(b)}	86272
53.06.19	Solor Selatan (South Solor)	31.58	4,841	6,874	8,015	Kalike	7	86273
53.06.07	Solor Timur (East Solor)	66.56	12,879	15,975	17,446	Menanga	17	86271
	Totals on Solor Island	226.34	27,041	34,029	37,474		39	
53.06.08	Adonara Barat (West Adonara)	79.71	11,743	13,529	14,256	Waiwadan	18	86263
53.06.09	Wotan Ulu Mado	86.31	7,871	9,968	10,996	Baniona	12	86260
53.06.18	Adonara Tengah (Central Adonara)	42.73	10,686	13,312	14,568	Lewobele	13	86264
53.06.10	Adonara Timur ^{(c)} (East Adonara)	91.06	26,161	30,299	32,010	Waiwerang	21 ^{(d)}	86261
53.06.13	Ile Boleng	49.30	13,948	17,416	19,081	Senadan	21	86253
63.06.12	Witihama	79.43	14,140	17,460	19,026	Oringbele	16	86266
53.06.11	Kelubagolit	44.41	10,210	12,650	13,807	Pepak Kelu	12	86265
53.06.17	Adonara ^{(e)}	56.80	9,745	11,835	12,794	Sagu	8	86262
	Totals on Adonara Island	529.75	104,504	126,469	136,538		121	

Note: (a) comprises 18 kelurahan (Amagarapati, Balela, Ekasapta, Larantuka, Lewolere, Lohayong, Lokea, Pantai Besar, Pohon Bao, Pohon Sirih, Postoh, Puken Tobi Wangi Bao, Sarotari, Sarotari Tengah, Sarotari Timur, Waibalun, Waihali and Weri) and 2 desa (Mocantarak and Lamawalang); Mocantarak desa is a large exclave of the district (covering 12.37 km^{2} with 1,556 inhabitants in mid 2023), separated by part of Ile Mandiri District from the rest of Larantuka District.
(b) including the kelurahan of Ritaebang.
(c) Adonara Timur District, notwithstanding its name, actually occupies the south-central part of Adonara Island, with Wotan Ulu Mado District to the southwest and Ile Boleng District to the southeast. (d) including the two kelurahan of Lamatewelu and Waiwerang Kota.
(e) Adonara District covers only the north-central part of Adonara Island ("Adonara Utara"), with Kelubagolit and Witihama Districts to the east and Adonara Barat and Adonara Tengah Districts to the west.
