= Solor =

Island in the Lesser Sunda Islands

Coordinates: 8°29′18″S 122°58′26″E

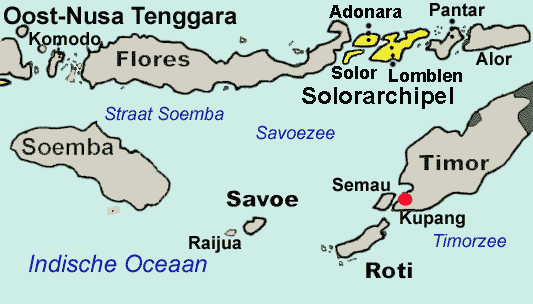
Solor Archipelago in yellow

Solor is a volcanic island located off the eastern tip of Flores island in the Lesser Sunda Islands of Indonesia, in the Solor Archipelago. It is situated administratively in the East Flores Regency of East Nusa Tenggara province. The island supports a small population that has been whaling for hundreds of years. They speak the languages of Adonara and Lamaholot. There are at least five volcanoes on this island which measures only 40 kilometres (25 miles) by 6 kilometres (3.7 miles). The island's area is 226.34 square kilometres (87 square miles), and it had a population of 34,029 at the 2020 Census. The official estimate as at mid 2025 was 37,474.

== Administrative districts ==
The island is divided into three districts (kecamatan), tabulated below with their areas (in km^{2}) and their populations at the 2010 Census and 2020 Census, together with the official estimates as at mid 2025.

Kode Wilayah	Name of District (kecamatan)	Area in km^{2}	Pop'n Census 2010	Pop'n Census 2020	Pop'n Estimate mid 2025	Admin centre	No. of villages	Post codes
53.06.06	Solor Barat (West Solor)	128.20	9,321	11,180	12,013	Ritaebang	15 ^{(a)}	86272
53.06.19	Solor Selatan (South Solor)	31.58	4,841	6,874	8,015	Kalike	7	86273
53.06.07	Solor Timur (East Solor)	66.56	12,879	15,975	17,446	Menanga	17	86271
	Totals on Solor Island	226.34	27,041	34,029	37,474		39	

Note: (a) including the town (kelurahan) of Ritaebang, with 1,516 inhabitants in mid 2023.

== Villages ==
West Solor District (kecamatan Solor Barat) is sub-divided into the town (kelurahan) of Ritaebang and fourteen rural villages (desa), as listed below with their areas and populations as at mid 2023.
South Solor District (kecamatan Solor Selatan) is sub-divided into seven rural villages (desa), as listed below with their areas and populations as at mid 2023.
East Solor District (kecamatan Solor Timur) is sub-divided into seventeen rural villages (desa), as listed below with their areas and populations as at mid 2023.

Kode Wilayah	Name of desa	Area in km^{2}	Pop'n mid 2023 estimate
53.06.06.1001	Ritaebang	17.99	1,516
53.06.06.2002	Tanah Lein	24.74	988
53.06.06.2003	Lamaole	17.24	445
53.06.06.2004	Kalelu	2.88	744
53.06.06.2005	Nuhalolong	3.25	591
53.06.06.2007	Balaweling II	6.75	818
53.06.06.2008	Balaweling I	6.75	730
53.06.06.2009	Pamakayo	9.98	765
53.06.06.2012	Ongalereng	4.50	1,333
53.06.06.2013	Karawatung	4.50	818
53.06.06.2014	Lamawohong	3.24	451
53.06.06.2015	Daniwato	3.50	751
53.06.06.2017	Lewotawah Ole	12.00	436
53.06.06.2019	Titehena	2.87	4,869
53.06.06.2020	Lewonama	8.90	3,589
Totals	West Solor	128.11	11,583
53.06.19.2001	Kalike	4.99	1,048
53.06.19.2002	Kalike Aimatan	4.00	1,132
53.06.19.2003	Sulengwaseng	4.50	915
53.06.19.2004	Kenere	3.01	694
53.06.19.2005	Lemanu	5.98	1,236
53.06.19.2006	Lewograran	5.69	959
53.06.17.2007	Bubu Atagamu	3.41	1,296
Totals	South Solor	31.58	7,280

Kode Wilayah	Name of desa	Area in km^{2}	Pop'n mid 2023 estimate
53.06.07.2002	Watanhura	1.43	704
53.06.07.2003	Lebao	2.71	879
53.06.07.2004	Watohari	6.85	753
53.06.07.2005	Moton Wutun	0.39	1,382
53.06.07.2006	Watobuku	1.45	1,233
53.06.07.2007	Labelen	4.69	773
53.06.07.2008	Menanga	12.49	664
53.06.07.2009	Lohayong I	3.01	694
53.06.07.2010	Wulublolong	5.98	1,236
53.06.07.2011	Liwo	5.69	959
53.06.07.2012	Tanah Werang	0.85	1,743
53.06.07.2013	Lewohedo	4.50	915
53.06.07.2014	Lohayong II	1.88	731
53.06.07.2016	Watanhura II	8.91	390
53.06.07.2017	Lewogeka	7.35	1,981
53.06.07.2018	Lamawai	5.41	1,713
53.06.07.2019	Kawuta	1.10	708
Totals	East Solor	66.56	17,066

== History ==
=== Pre-colonial period ===
In the 14th century, Solor was said to have been conquered by the Majapahit empire, and the island is mentioned in the Negarakertagama as a possession of Majapahit. In the 16th century, parts of the island were under the influence of the Sultanate of Ternate. Since at least the 16th century, Solor played an important role in the trade of sandalwood by acting as a popular safe harbor for ships engaged in the trade. This made Solor a relevant part of the mercantile networks of the wider region, a situation that would be reversed with the arrival of the Portuguese.

=== Colonial period ===
In 1520, the Portuguese established a trading post in the village of Lamakera on the eastern side of the island as a transit harbor between Maluku and Portuguese Malacca. In 1562, Dominican priests built a palm-trunk fortress which Javanese Muslims burned down the following year. The fort was rebuilt from more durable materials and the Dominicans commenced the Christianisation of the local population. By 1590 the Portuguese and Christian population numbered about 25,000. There were, however, repeated displays of resistance against both the Portuguese and their religion; in 1598–1599, for example, the Portuguese required an armada of 90 ships to put down a Solorese uprising.

At this time, there was a conflict between the traders and the priests, so the traders left Solor and settled in Larantuka at Flores island. When the Dutch came in 1613, the priests surrendered at the first attack and were brought to Larantuka, too.

The Dutch kept the fort, but did not make a profit close to the Portuguese port. After two commanders defected to the Portuguese, they gave up Solor. In 1636 the Portuguese were attacked by the Dutch and had to abandon the fort. In 1646 the Dutch occupied the fort again. The first of the new commanders was suspended, because he married an indigenous woman. The second commander challenged the Portuguese commander to a duel and was slain. In 1648 the Dutch left and the Dominican priests returned.

In 1851 the Portuguese governor José Joaquim Lopes de Lima sold Solor and other areas of the Lesser Sunda Islands, which had been under Portuguese sovereignty, to the Netherlands for 200,000 florins without authorization from Lisbon. Lisbon did not recognise the sale and had Lopes arrested. He died on the way back to Europe. From 1854, the agreements were renegotiated. The sale was finally confirmed in the Lisbon Treaty and was ratified in 1859. Although the Dutch occupied the fort with a small force, the occupation was withdrawn again in 1869 for economic reasons but the official affiliation to the Netherlands remained. It was under Japanese occupation between 1942 and 1945, but along with the state of East Indonesia was later annexed into the United States of Indonesia with independence in 1949.

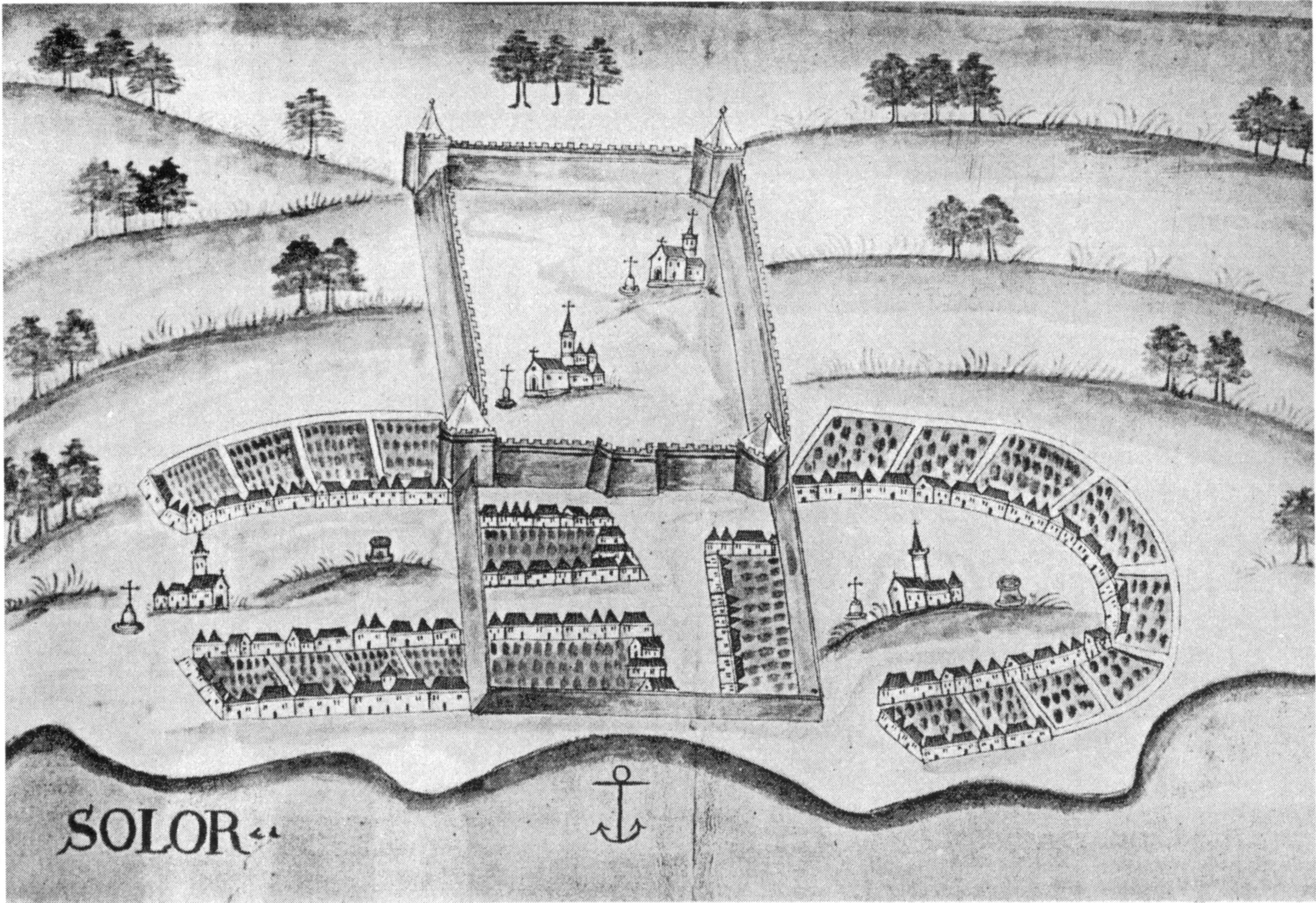
Portuguese Fortress of Solor

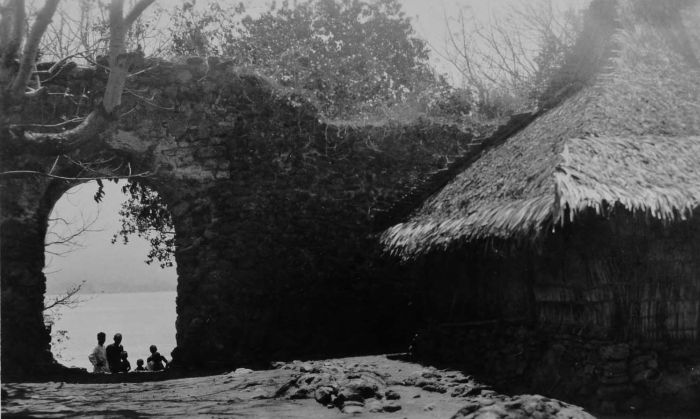
Ruins of a fort in Solor in the 1930s

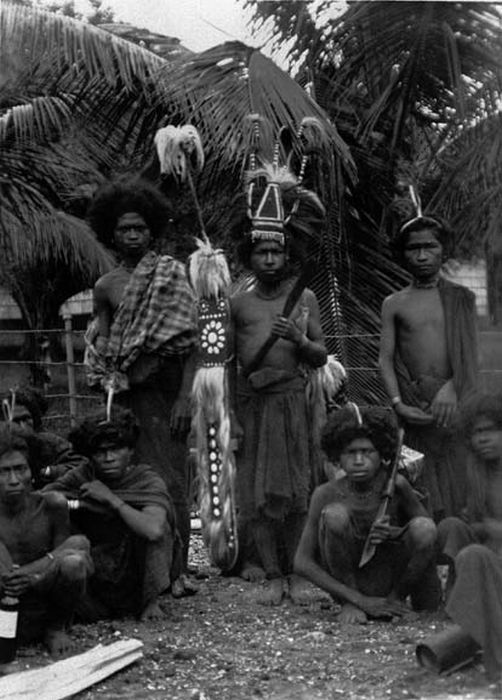
Solor warriors, 1915.

== Towns and villages ==
- Amakebo
- Apelame
- Aplame
- Balawelin
- Balawelin I – Riangtaliha and Lamalewo
- Balawelin II – Riangmuda and Rianglaka
- Buwu-Atagamu
- Daniwato
- Enatukan
- Karawatung
- Kelike
- Kelike – Lewolo and lamagohan
- Kenere
- Kukuwerang
- Lamakera, Indonesia
- Lamawolo
- Lamboleng
- Lebao
- Lemanu
- Lewograran
- Lewograran
- Lewohedo
- Liko
- Liwo
- Lohayong
- Menanga
- Ongalereng
- Pamakayo
- Sulengwaseng
- Wulublolong
