= Gewayantana Airport =

Airport in Larantuka, East Nusa Tenggara, Indonesia

Gewayantana Airport Bandar Udara Gewayantana
- IATA: LKA; ICAO: WATL

Summary
- Airport type: Public
- Owner: Government of Indonesia
- Operator: Directorate General of Civil Aviation
- Serves: Larantuka
- Location: Ile Mandiri District, East Flores Regency, Flores, East Nusa Tenggara, Indonesia
- Time zone: WITA (UTC+08:00)
- Elevation AMSL: 9 m (30 ft)
- Coordinates: 08°16′28.36″S 123°00′8.38″E

Map
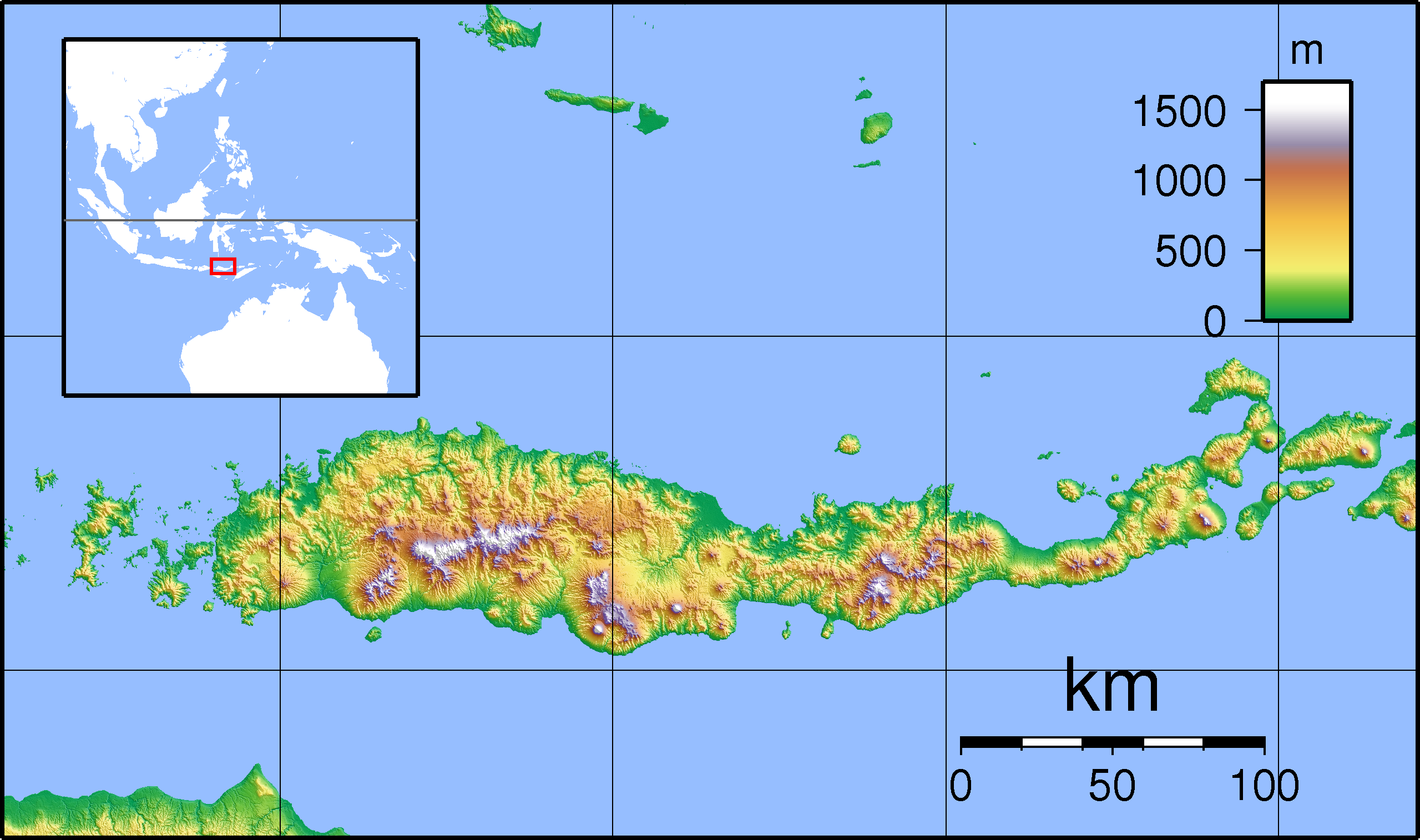
- Location of airport in Flores

Runways
Direction	Length		Surface
Direction	m	ft	Surface
10/28	1,600	5,249	Asphalt

Statistics (2024)
- Passengers: 56,632 (▲71.1%)
- Cargo (tonnes): 144.43 (▲2.1%)
- Aircraft movements: 951 (▲45.0%)
- Source: DGCA

Gewayantana Airport (IATA: LKA, ICAO: WATL) is a domestic regional airport serving Larantuka. the administrative seat of East Flores Regency, in the island of Flores in East Nusa Tenggara province, Indonesia. The name "Gewayantana" is derived from a local language spoken in East Flores, particularly in the Larantuka and Lamaholot areas, and carries a profound philosophical meaning associated with togetherness, cooperation, and communal solidarity. It is located in the village of Tiwatobi, Ile Mandiri District about 10 km (6.2 mi) from Larantuka town center, and serve as the point of entry to the town and eastern Flores from air. As of 2026, Wings Air is the sole airline operating flights to the airport, connecting Larantuka with Kupang in Timor, the provincial capital of East Nusa Tenggara. Previously the airport was other airlines, such as Merpati Nusantara Airlines and TransNusa, but all of these airlines have ceased flights to the airport.

== History ==
=== Construction and early history ===
Check-in counters

The development of Gewayantana Airport was first initiated by the East Flores Regency Government in 1972, during the administration of Regent C. Y. Monteiro, following the transfer of a parcel of land by traditional elders and residents of Watowiti Village to the local government. The project began with a site survey conducted by a Catholic priest and engineer, Father Ir. Florante, SVD. Construction of Gewayantana Airport began in 1974 using funds from the local government. The initial runway measured 700 m × 23 m (2,297 ft × 75 ft). The airport was officially inaugurated and commenced operations in 1976, marked by the first landing of a Cessna aircraft operated by Mission Aviation Fellowship (MAF). At the time, the airport was classified as a rural airstrip and served exclusively pioneer flights. Merpati Nusantara Airlines was among the first airlines to operate commercial services to the airport, serving a pioneer route linking Kupang, Maumere, and Larantuka before returning to Kupang.

By the 1990s, the airport continued to serve only pioneer routes. Merpati Nusantara Airlines maintained a weekly service from Kupang to Larantuka, with flights continuing onward to Lewoleba. The runway at the time consisted of a mixture of grass and asphalt and could accommodate only small aircraft, such as the de Havilland Canada DHC-6 Twin Otter. By 1999, the airport's runway had been extended to 850 m × 23 m (2,789 ft × 75 ft), allowing it to accommodate larger aircraft such as the CASA C-212 Aviocar.

During the 2000s, the runway was upgraded and fully paved with asphalt. The runway was extended again and widened to 1,200 m × 30 m (3,937 ft × 98 ft) sometime before 2012, allowing the airport to accommodate aircraft up to the size of the ATR 42. During the same period, additional airlines began serving Larantuka. During the decade, TransNusa introduced three weekly flights between Kupang and Larantuka, complementing the services operated by Merpati Nusantara Airlines. The route was operated using ATR 42 and BAe 146 aircraft in cooperation with Aviastar and Indonesia Air Transport. Around the same period, Susi Air also began operating pioneer flights between Kupang and Larantuka using Cessna 208 Caravan aircraft.

=== Contemporary history ===
Boarding gate

In 2014, Wings Air launched a route between Kupang and Larantuka, operated with ATR 72 aircraft. In 2016, TransNusa began collaborating with NAM Air, a subsidiary of Sriwijaya Air, to operate the Kupang–Larantuka route, which was served using Fokker 50 aircraft. NAM Air would operate the flights using aircraft provided by TransNusa, while the route would be integrated into Sriwijaya Air and NAM Air's wider network. That same year, the government announced plans to expand and develop the airport, including extending the runway to accommodate larger aircraft. Although funding had been allocated for the project, its implementation was delayed by land acquisition issues, as local residents occupying land designated for the expansion opposed the plans. In 2021, local residents blocked the access road to the airport over unpaid compensation for land acquired for the airport's development.

TransNusa continued operating the Kupang–Larantuka route until 2021, when it suspended all services in East Nusa Tenggara amid the COVID-19 pandemic and the resulting decline in passenger demand. As a result, Wings Air became the sole airline operating scheduled flights to and from the airport as of 2026, with Kupang as its only destination. The airport authority is actively lobbying the Ministry of Transportation to introduce new routes to the airport, including Larantuka–Selayar–Makassar and Larantuka–Ende. The East Flores Regency Government has also proposed the introduction of a Larantuka–Labuan Bajo route to improve air connectivity and support tourism in Larantuka and the surrounding areas.

Between 2024 and 2026, the airport was temporarily closed on multiple occasions due to volcanic eruptions in the surrounding area, severely disrupting air services to Larantuka. In January 2024, it was closed for two days following eruptions of Mount Lewotobi. In September 2025, the airport was closed again for six days due to an eruption of Mount Ili Lewotolok. In June 2026, both volcanoes erupted simultaneously, resulting in another temporary closure of the airport.

== Facilities and development ==
Baggage claim area

The airport has a 600 m² (6,458 sq ft) passenger terminal, with its departure gates capable of accommodating up to 120 passengers during peak hours. The current terminal was built in a modern architectural style, replacing the former terminal, and was constructed between 2016 and 2019, with its interior renovated in 2023. The terminal features a warm and welcoming atmosphere, combining modern design elements with traditional Flores carvings incorporated throughout parts of the interior to reflect the region's cultural heritage. It is equipped with basic facilities, including check-in counters, departure gates, baggage carousels in the arrivals hall, prayer rooms, a lactation room, a VIP room, toilets, and a canteen. In addition to the passenger terminal, the airport has a 60 m² (646 sq ft) administrative building, a 105 m² (1,130 sq ft) powerhouse, and a 192 m² (2,067 sq ft) aircraft rescue and firefighting (PKP-PK) building.

On the airside, the airport has a single runway measuring 1,600 m × 30 m (5,249 ft × 98 ft), capable of accommodating aircraft up to the size of the ATR 72. The runway is equipped with two turn pads at either end, each measuring 100 m × 7.5 m (328 ft × 25 ft), as well as a 100 m × 120 m (328 ft × 394 ft) Runway End Safety Area (RESA). The runway is non-instrument and lacks published straight-in instrument approach procedures and electronic navigation aids such as an Instrument Landing System (ILS). Consequently, aircraft operating at the airport rely on visual approaches and are restricted to daytime operations. The runway is planned to be extended to 1,800 m (5,906 ft) to accommodate larger aircraft. The East Flores Regency Government has allocated approximately 12 hectares (30 acres) for the runway extension and a total of 35.2 hectares (87 acres) for the wider airport expansion, with the project estimated to cost approximately Rp153 billion. In addition to the runway, the airport has two taxiways connecting the runway to the apron, each measuring 34 m × 18 m (112 ft × 59 ft). The airport also has two aircraft aprons, measuring 80 m × 40 m (262 ft × 131 ft) and 60 m × 40 m (197 ft × 131 ft), with the latter providing two aircraft parking stands.

== Airlines and destinations ==
Airlines	Destinations
Wings Air	Kupang

== Statistics ==
A Wings Air ATR 72 at Gewayantana Airport

Annual passenger numbers and aircraft statistics
Year	Passengers handled	Passenger % change	Cargo (tonnes)	Cargo % change	Aircraft movements	Aircraft % change
2006	5,549	Steady	13.75	Steady	344	Steady
2007	2,321	▼58.2	2.21	▼83.9	138	▼59.9
2008	2,198	▼5.3	3.64	▲64.7	122	▼11.6
2009	2,827	▲28.6	2.81	▼22.8	104	▼14.8
2010	4,858	▲71.8	2.72	▼3.2	390	▲275.0
2011	6,490	▲33.6	2.91	▲7.0	654	▲67.7
2012	14,557	▲124.3	6.45	▲121.6	766	▲17.1
2013	43,680	▲200.1	30.33	▲370.2	964	▲25.8
2014	26,741	▼38.8	35.87	▲18.3	688	▼28.6
2015	49,467	▲85.0	43.70	▲21.8	1,160	▲68.6
2016	74,472	▲50.5	36.42	▼16.7	1,314	▲13.3
2017	88,296	▲18.6	61.99	▲70.2	1,498	▲14.0
2018	102,050	▲15.6	87.87	▲41.7	1,852	▲23.6
2019	75,665	▼25.9	126.44	▲43.9	1,544	▼16.6
2020	51,293	▼32.2	146.86	▲16.1	932	▼39.6
2021	33,403	▼34.9	163.28	▲11.2	716	▼23.2
2022	30,562	▼8.5	134.71	▼17.5	618	▼13.7
2023	33,101	▲8.3	141.49	▲5.0	656	▲6.1
2024	56,632	▲71.1	144.43	▲2.1	951	▲45.0
^{Source: DGCA, BPS}
