= Wunopito Airport =

Airport in Indonesia

Wunopito Airport Bandar Udara Wunopito
- IATA: LWE; ICAO: WATW

Summary
- Airport type: Public
- Owner: Government of Indonesia
- Operator: Directorate General of Civil Aviation
- Serves: Lewoleba
- Location: Nubatukan District, Lembata Regency, Lembata, East Nusa Tenggara, Indonesia
- Time zone: WITA (UTC+08:00)
- Elevation AMSL: 5 m (16 ft)
- Coordinates: 08°21′45″S 123°26′17″E

Map
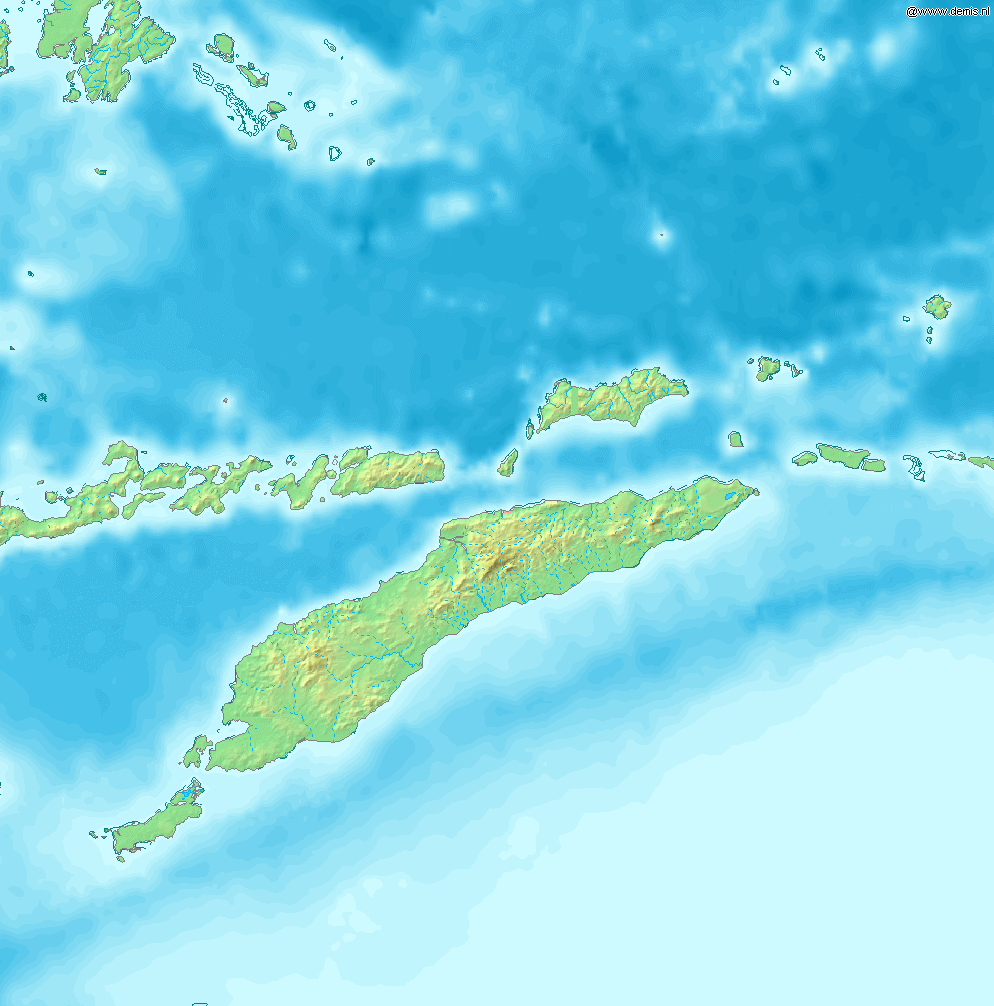
- Location of airport in Lembata LWE (Indonesia)

Runways
Direction	Length		Surface
Direction	m	ft	Surface
02/20	1,200	3,937	Asphalt

Statistics (2024)
- Passengers: 12,965 (▼25.2%)
- Cargo (tonnes): 14.56 (▼40.4%)
- Aircraft movements: 951 (▼22.1%)
- Source: DGCA

Wunopito Airport (IATA: LWE, ICAO: WATW), is a domestic regional airport serving Lewoleba, the administrative seat of Lembata Regency, on the island of Lembata in East Nusa Tenggara, Indonesia. The name "Wunopito" means "Seven Stars" or "Seven Hills" in the local language, symbolizing the seven original districts of Lembata Regency. The airport is located close to the center of Lewoleba, approximately 2.5 km (1.6 mi) from the Lembata Regent's Office. It is the only airport on Lembata Island and serves as the main gateway to Lewoleba, Lembata Regency, and surrounding areas by air. As of 2026, Wings Air is the sole airline operating scheduled flights to the airport, connecting Lewoleba with Kupang on Timor Island, the provincial capital of East Nusa Tenggara. Previously, airlines including Merpati Nusantara Airlines and TransNusa also operated scheduled services to the airport, but these services have since been discontinued.

== History ==
=== Construction and early history ===
Check-in counters

Wunopito Airport was constructed in 1977 by the East Flores Regency Government, when Lembata was still part of the regency. The airport was built to meet the air transportation needs of the local population and support development in various sectors across Lembata. The name "Wunopito" means "Seven Stars" or "Seven Hills" in the Lamaholot language, referring to the seven original districts of Lembata: Buyasuri, Omesuri, Lebatukan, Ile Ape, Nubatukan, Atadei, and Nagawutung. The airfield initially consisted of only basic facilities, with the runway at the time consisting of a grass surface. The first aircraft to land at the airport was operated by Mission Aviation Fellowship (MAF), carrying several East Nusa Tenggara provincial government officials.

On 27 May 1985, Wunopito Airport marked an important milestone when a Merpati Nusantara Airlines de Havilland Canada DHC-6 Twin Otter conducted its first test landing at the airfield. The test landing was preceded by a traditional ceremony conducted by local customary elders, who sought the protection of God Almighty and offered prayers and praise to Ina, Ama Tua Magu, and Lera Wulan Tana Ekan, in accordance with Lamaholot traditions and beliefs practiced in East Flores and Lembata. Following the successful test landing, Merpati Nusantara Airlines began operating scheduled commercial services to the airport, connecting Lewoleba with Kupang and Larantuka.

Initially, Wunopito Airport was managed by the East Flores Regency Government from 1977 to 1990. In 1991, its management was transferred to the Directorate General of Civil Aviation of the Ministry of Transportation. Throughout the 1990s, Merpati Nusantara Airlines continued to operate two weekly pioneer flights to the airport, serving the Kupang–Larantuka–Lewoleba route before returning to Kupang. Following the 1997 Asian financial crisis and the political and economic instability that followed in Indonesia, the airport was closed. It resumed operations in 2002, with flights to Kupang subsequently resuming. After the resumption of operations, the government began announcing plans to develop the airport, including extending the runway, which at the time could accommodate only Merpati Nusantara Airlines' DHC-6 Twin Otter and CASA C-212 Aviocar. The planned improvements were intended to prepare the airport for Pelita Air, which was then considering launching a Denpasar–Labuan Bajo–Maumere–Lewoleba–Denpasar route using the de Havilland Canada Dash 7.

=== Contemporary history ===
Departure gate

By the 2010s, additional airlines had begun introducing services to the airport. In May 2013, TransNusa launched a Kupang–Lewoleba route using Fokker 50 aircraft. Around the same time, Susi Air also began operating the Kupang–Lewoleba route, complementing Merpati Nusantara Airlines' services to the airport. The Lembata Regency Government also lobbied Merpati to introduce a direct route to Labuan Bajo, with the aim of improving air connectivity and promoting tourism in Lembata. However, the airport's short runway remained a major constraint. At the time, the government planned to develop several regional airports across East Nusa Tenggara, with a total budget of Rp1.2 trillion allocated through the state budget (APBN). The Lembata Regency Government has also proposed designating the airport as an international airport and lobbied the Ministry of Transportation to facilitate the introduction of direct international flights to Darwin, Australia, in the future.

TransNusa continued operating flights to Lewoleba until 2021, when it suspended all services in East Nusa Tenggara amid the COVID-19 pandemic, as travel restrictions and the resulting decline in passenger demand affected its operations. In June 2021, Wings Air began operating daily services from Kupang to Lewoleba using ATR 72 aircraft. However, due to the airport's short runway, each flight was restricted to a maximum of 58 passengers. As of 2026, Wings Air is the sole airline operating scheduled flights to and from the airport.

In 2022, the Lembata Regency Government discussed a proposal to rename the airport as Petrus Gute Betekeneng Airport or Guru Gute Betekeneng Airport. The proposed name would honor Petrus Gute Betekeneng, a Lembatanese politician who advocated for Lembata's autonomy and played a role in the establishment of Lembata Regency as a separate administrative entity from East Flores Regency in 1999.

During the 2020s, the airport was closed several times due to volcanic activity from Mount Ile Lewotolok, located relatively close to the airport, as well as Mount Lewotobi on the neighboring island of Flores. It experienced temporary closures in 2021, 2024, 2025, and 2026, resulting in flight cancellations and disruptions to air services to Lewoleba and access to Lembata.

== Facilities and development ==
=== Landside facilities ===
VIP room

The airport is equipped with a single passenger terminal measuring 1,080 m² (11,625 sq ft), with an annual capacity of 15,138 passengers and a boarding gate capacity of up to 90 passengers during peak periods. The terminal provides basic passenger facilities, including check-in counters, a boarding gate, an arrival hall, a VIP room, a canteen, restrooms, and prayer rooms. In 2023, the Lembata Regency Government announced plans to expand the passenger terminal to accommodate increasing passenger demand. In addition to the passenger terminal, the airport is also equipped with other landside facilities such as an administration building measuring 360 m² (3,875 sq ft), an AirNav Indonesia office measuring 36 m² (388 sq ft), a 120 m² (1,292 sq ft) powerhouse, an aircraft rescue and firefighting (PKP-PK) building measuring 380.5 m² (4,096 sq ft), and a vehicle parking area measuring 4,266 m² (45,920 sq ft).

=== Airside facilities ===
On the airside, the airport has a single runway measuring 1,200 m × 30 m (3,937 ft × 98 ft), capable of accommodating aircraft up to the size of an ATR 72, although operations are subject to payload restrictions. The runway is equipped with two turn pads, one at each end, measuring 72.7 m × 13 m (238.5 ft × 42.7 ft) each, as well as a 100 m × 30 m (328 ft × 98 ft) Runway End Safety Area (RESA). The runway is non-instrument and lacks published straight-in instrument approach procedures and electronic navigation aids such as an Instrument Landing System (ILS). Consequently, aircraft operating at the airport rely on visual approaches and are restricted to daytime operations. Plans have been proposed to extend the runway to 1,500 m (4,921 ft), which would allow the airport to accommodate ATR 72 aircraft without payload restrictions. The government plans to allocate approximately Rp200 billion for the extension, including land acquisition and site clearance.

In addition to the runway, the airport has a single taxiway connecting the runway to the apron, measuring 53.5 m × 15 m (175.5 ft × 49.2 ft), and an aircraft apron measuring 90 m × 50 m (295.3 ft × 164 ft).

=== New airport ===
Because of its proximity to Mount Ile Lewotolok, Wunopito Airport faces terrain constraints that affect aircraft approaches. Aircraft must approach and land from the north, as approaches from the south are obstructed by the mountain. These constraints have prompted the Lembata Regency Government to explore the construction of a new airport to replace Wunopito Airport. The proposed airport would be located in Tanjung Ile Ape Village, Ile Ape District, on an 80-hectare site. It is planned to be developed to international standards and would feature a 2,500 m (8,202 ft) runway, substantially longer than Wunopito Airport's existing runway. As of 2018, negotiations with local landowners had begun, with approximately 80% reportedly agreeing to the proposed construction of the new airport.

== Airlines and destinations ==
Airlines	Destinations
Wings Air	Kupang

== Statistics ==
A Wings Air ATR 72 at Wunopito Airport

Annual passenger numbers and aircraft statistics
Year	Passengers handled	Passenger % change	Cargo (tonnes)	Cargo % change	Aircraft movements	Aircraft % change
2006	9,224	Steady	60.15	Steady	306	Steady
2007	8,719	▼5.5	18.12	▼69.9	288	▼5.9
2008	4,903	▼43.8	9.48	▼47.7	170	▼41.0
2009	3,182	▼35.1	2.32	▼75.5	173	▲1.8
2010	7,563	▲137.7	4.10	▲76.7	420	▲142.8
2011	12,765	▲68.8	3.40	▼17.1	1,234	▲193.8
2012	10,248	▼19.7	2.04	▼40.0	1,074	▼13.0
2013	17,801	▲73.7	7.39	▲262.3	1,166	▲8.6
2014	23,214	▲30.4	26.62	▲260.2	1,102	▼5.5
2015	24,185	▲4.2	9.33	▼65.0	1,248	▲13.2
2016	25,944	▲7.3	17.91	▲92.0	1,120	▼10.3
2017	27,399	▲5.6	39.47	▲120.4	1,082	▼3.4
2018	30,211	▲10.3	60.38	▲53.0	902	▼16.6
2019	27,099	▼10.3	51.35	▼15.0	760	▼15.7
2020	7,862	▼71.0	31.19	▼39.3	232	▼69.5
2021	9,497	▲20.8	7.86	▼74.8	222	▼4.3
2022	20,772	▲118.7	19.92	▲153.4	465	▲109.5
2023	17,331	▼16.6	24.42	▲22.6	362	▼22.2
2024	12,965	▼25.2	14.56	▼40.4	282	▼22.1
^{Source: DGCA, BPS}
