= TransNusa =

Airline of Indonesia

PT TransNusa Aviation Mandiri
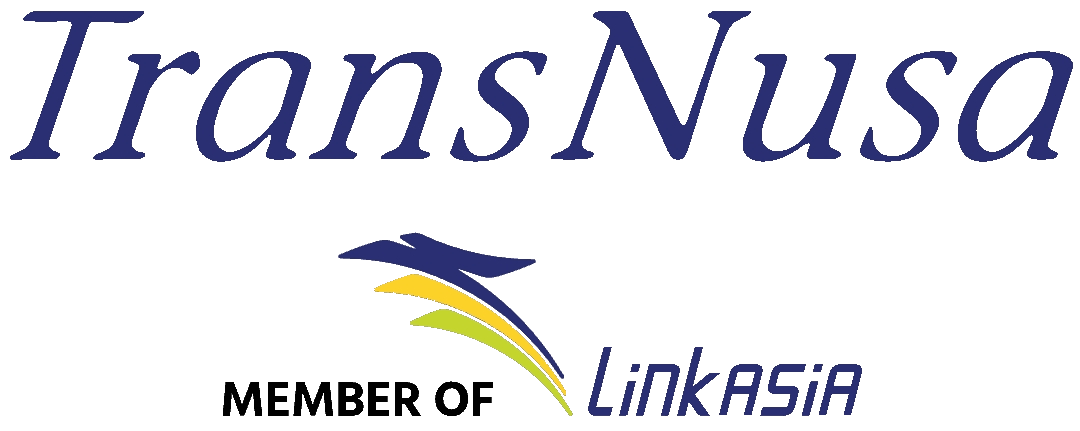
- TransNusa's logo used since 2021

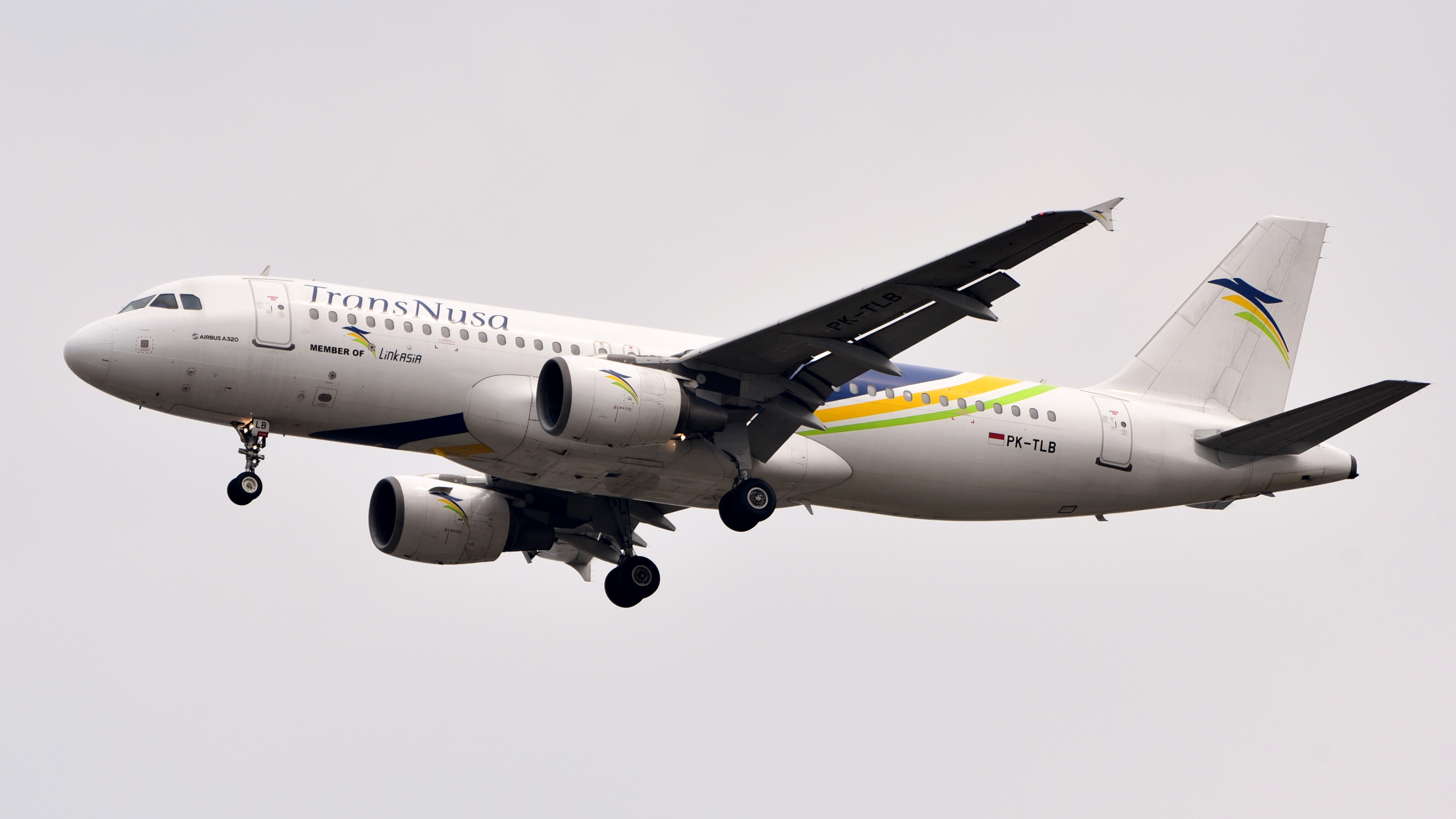
- TransNusa Airbus A320
IATA	ICAO	Call sign
8B (Note: Not current)	TNU	TRANSNUSA
- Founded: 4 August 2005; 21 years ago (original); 20 October 2022; 4 years ago (relaunch)
- Hubs: Soekarno–Hatta International Airport
- Secondary hubs: Ngurah Rai International Airport
- Fleet size: 15
- Destinations: 12
- Parent company: PT Panca Global International Indonesia (51%); Linkasia Airlines Group Ltd (China Everbright Limited) (49%)
- Headquarters: Jakarta, Indonesia (head office)
- Key people: Bayu Sutanto; Dato' Bernard Francis; Leo Budiman
- Website: www.transnusa.co.id

TransNusa is an airline headquartered in Jakarta, Indonesia. It was launched in August 2005, serving various destinations from Kupang, Timor, using aircraft chartered from Pelita Air and Trigana Air Service. In August 2011, TransNusa received its own air operator's certificate (AOC) and scheduled commercial airline permit, operating as a regional carrier. The airline relaunched in 2022 after briefly ceasing operations in 2020 as a result of the COVID-19 pandemic. Due to a change in strategy, the airline has since been aligning itself closer to a full-service carrier.

== History ==
=== Launch and early years (2005–2011) ===
TransNusa undertook its first commercial flight on August 4, 2005 in co-operation with Trigana Air Service. Initial services were established to Waingapu, Tambolaka and Lewoleba followed by routes to Alor, Ende, Maumere, Ruteng serviced by a Trigana Air ATR 42-300. Subsequently, TransNusa agreed to further co-operative partnerships in Nusa Tenggara with Riau Airlines using Fokker 50s with a second Trigana supplied ATR 42 introduced in April 2006. In June, a Boeing 737-200 was supplied on contract from Trigana to service the routes, Kupang to Denpasar to Surabaya and Kupang to Makassar. In late 2006, the 737 service was replaced by a Pelita Air Fokker F28-4000.

In March 2007, arrangements with Mandala Airlines commenced with TransNusa acting both as a ticketing agent for Mandala at their office in Kupang and operating as a feeder service to the then-new Mandala Airbus A320 service operating from Kupang airport. This connected TransNusa's East Nusa Tenggara services into the Mandala Indonesian network through Jakarta and Surabaya. TransNusa commenced by block buying seats on the A320 services. In August 2007, TransNusa entered into a route subsidy agreement with the West Nusa Tenggara provincial government to provide services for the Mataram to Sumbawa and Mataram to Bima routes. The subsidised services were provided three times a week. In October 2007, TransNusa established the first implementation of airline e-ticketing in East Nusa Tenggara.

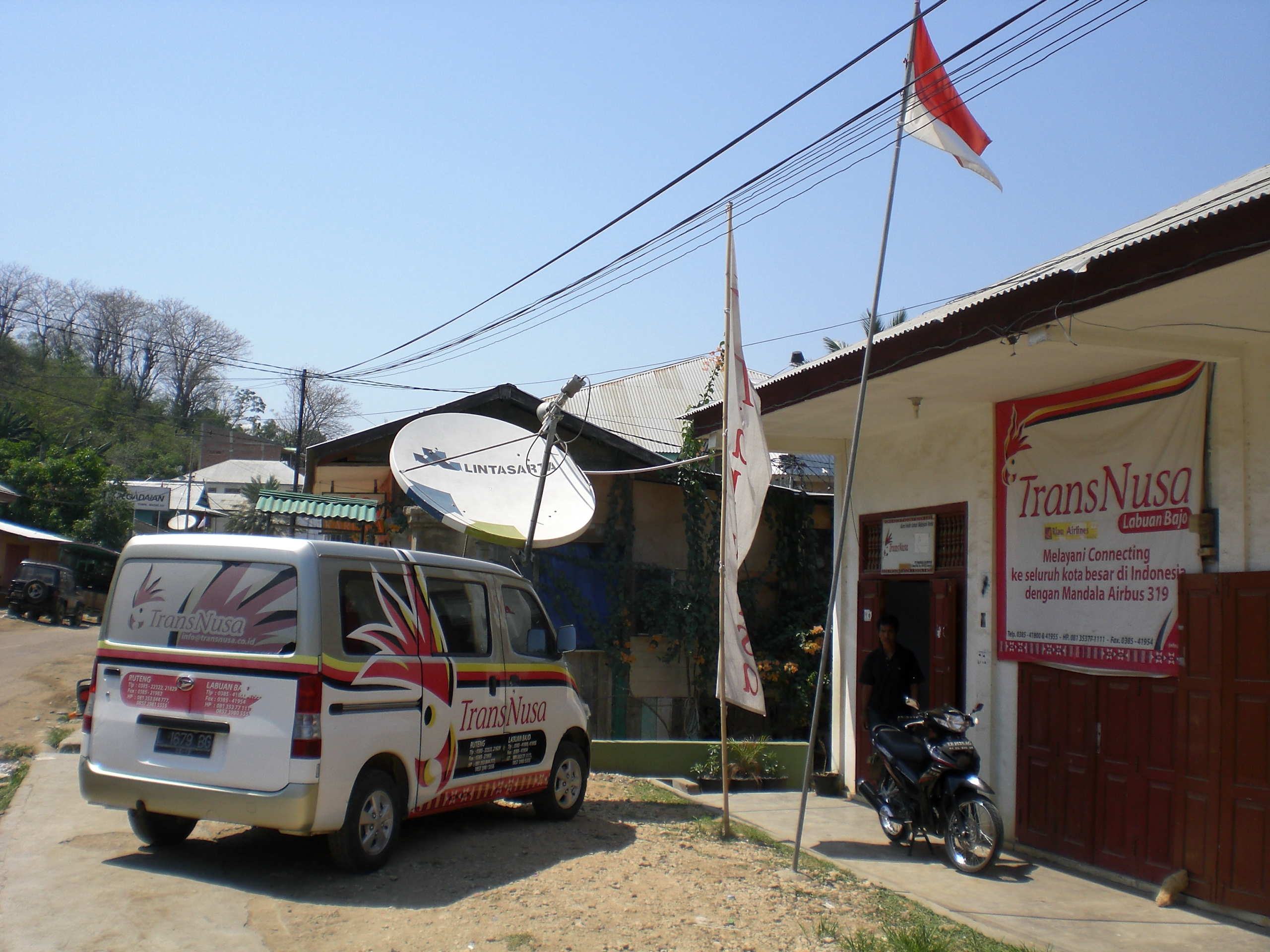
TransNusa office in Labuan Bajo

By March 2008, TransNusa was operating 4 Fokker 50 turboprop aircraft in fleet co-operation arrangements with Riau Airlines. On 10 September 2008, Mandala Airlines announced arrangements with TransNusa to supply further feeder services from Jakarta via Surabaya providing services to passengers through the Kupang hub, connecting to and from destinations including Ende, Sika, Bajawa, Lombok, Waingapu, Tambolaka, Labuan Bajo and Alor.

In December 2009, charter airline Aviastar took delivery of a second new BAe 146-200 from BAE Systems to be operated on behalf of TransNusa in a 98-seat all-economy layout. It was announced that the new aircraft was to be based at Denpasar Airport in Bali to operate to destinations in East Nusa Tenggara. This aircraft complemented an ATR 42-300 aircraft acquired in a similar collaboration with Indonesia Air Transport (IAT) for operations in East Nusa Tenggara originating from Kupang and serving the Maumere, Alor and Lewoleba routes. The ATR 42-300 aircraft also served airports in the region that have a relatively short runway, such as Larantuka, Rote, and Sabu. The co-operation with IAT grew the airline's ATR 42-300 fleet to four aircraft by the end of the year. In 2010, TransNusa offered connections into the Sriwijaya Air network to link directly with flights from Kupang to Surabaya and Jakarta.

=== Independent operation and suspension of operations (2011–2020) ===
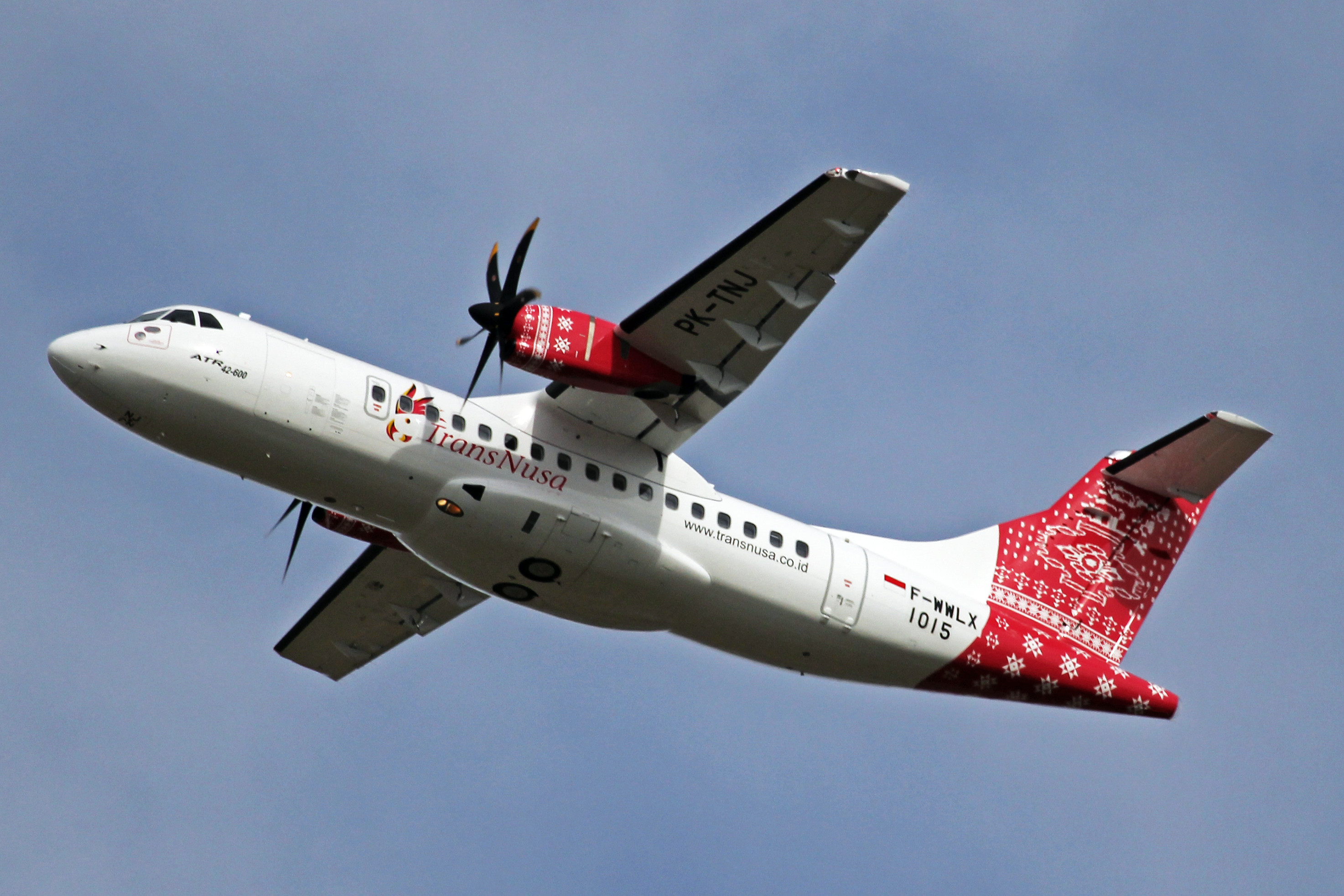
An ATR 42-500 formerly operated by TransNusa

In 2011, TransNusa expanded into operating commercially scheduled flights through the procurement of its own aircraft and the obtaining of the 121 Regular Aviation Operation License issued by the Indonesian Civil Aviation Authority.

In 2017, TransNusa expanded its fleet when it introduced two brand new ATR 72-600s, followed by a further ATR 72-600 and ATR 42-500 the following year. By June 2019, TransNusa had in its fleet seven ATR aircraft in its commercial fleet with a further three on order, complemented by a single BAe 146.

Impacted by the effects on the industry by the COVID-19 pandemic, the airline suspended operations in September 2020, which led to its fleet being transferred back to lessors.

=== Relaunch (2021–present) ===
In November 2021, TransNusa announced through Instagram that the airline intends to return operating, although as a low-cost carrier in place of its former regional model. The airline reapplied for an Air Operator's certificate and conducted proving flights in February 2022.

In early 2022, the airline, now backed and part-owned by the China Aircraft Leasing Group (CALC) (indirect subsidiary of China Everbright Group), announced that it will be operating a mixed fleet of Airbus A320neos and Comac ARJ21s, making TransNusa the first foreign operator of the latter aircraft.

On 6 October 2022, TransNusa officially relaunched with a flight between Jakarta and Denpasar. In February 2024, the airline announced a strategy change to reposition the airline into a "premium service carrier", claiming that it has implemented plans to differentiate the airline apart from other low-cost carriers. In April 2025, the airline transitioned into a medium service carrier; this resulted in the offering of complimentary light snacks and baggage allowance on domestic flights, in line with the requirements for a medium service airline as stipulated by the Indonesian government.

== Destinations ==
The airline has disclosed that it will focus on flying between larger airports rather than revive its former inter-island network.

As of November 2026, TransNusa flies (or has flown) to the following destinations.

Country	City	Airport	Notes	Refs
Australia	Melbourne	Melbourne Airport		
Australia	Perth	Perth Airport		
China	Guangzhou	Guangzhou Baiyun International Airport		
China	Guiyang	Guiyang Longdongbao International Airport	Charter	
China	Nanjing	Nanjing Lukou International Airport	Charter	
China	Shanghai	Shanghai Pudong International Airport		
China	Shenzhen	Shenzhen Bao'an International Airport		
East Timor	Dili	Presidente Nicolau Lobato International Airport	Terminated	
Indonesia	Ambon	Pattimura Airport	Terminated	
Indonesia	Alor	Alor Island Airport	Terminated	
Indonesia	Atambua	A. A. Bere Tallo Airport	Terminated	
Indonesia	Bajawa	Bajawa Soa Airport	Terminated	
Indonesia	Balikpapan	Sultan Aji Muhammad Sulaiman Sepinggan Airport	Terminated	
Indonesia	Bandar Lampung	Radin Inten II Airport	Terminated	
Indonesia	Bandung	Husein Sastranegara Airport	Terminated	
Indonesia	Banjarmasin	Syamsudin Noor International Airport	Terminated	
Indonesia	Bau Bau	Betoambari Airport	Terminated	
Indonesia	Berau	Kalimarau Airport	Terminated	
Indonesia	Bima	Sultan Muhammad Salahudin Airport		
Indonesia	Denpasar	Ngurah Rai International Airport		
Indonesia	Ende	H. Hasan Aroeboesman Airport	Terminated	
Indonesia	Jakarta	Soekarno–Hatta International Airport	Hub	
Indonesia	Kendari	Haluoleo Airport	Terminated	
Indonesia	Kupang	El Tari Airport	Terminated	
Indonesia	Kolaka	Sangia Nibandera Airport	Terminated	
Indonesia	Kotabaru	Gusti Syamsir Alam Airport	Terminated	
Indonesia	Labuan Bajo	Komodo International Airport	Terminated	
Indonesia	Larantuka	Gewayantana Airport	Terminated	
Indonesia	Lewoleba	Wonopito Airport	Terminated	
Indonesia	Lombok	Lombok International Airport		
Indonesia	Luwuk	Syukuran Aminuddin Amir Airport	Terminated	
Indonesia	Makassar	Sultan Hasanuddin International Airport		
Indonesia	Mamuju	Tampa Padang Airport	Terminated	
Indonesia	Manado	Sam Ratulangi International Airport		
Indonesia	Maumere	Frans Xavier Seda Airport	Terminated	
Indonesia	Morowali	Maleo Airport	Terminated	
Indonesia	Palangkaraya	Tjilik Riwut Airport	Terminated	
Indonesia	Palopo	Bua Airport	Terminated	
Indonesia	Palu	Mutiara SIS Al-Jufrie Airport	Terminated	
Indonesia	Ruteng	Frans Sales Lega Airport	Terminated	
Indonesia	Selayar	H. Aroeppala Airport	Terminated	
Indonesia	Semarang	Jenderal Ahmad Yani International Airport	Terminated	
Indonesia	Singkawang	Singkawang Airport		
Indonesia	Sorong	Domine Eduard Osok Airport		
Indonesia	Sumbawa Besar	Sultan Muhammad Kaharuddin III Airport	Terminated	
Indonesia	Surabaya	Juanda International Airport		
Indonesia	Tambolaka	Lede Kalumbang Airport	Terminated	
Indonesia	Tana Toraja	Pongtiku Airport	Terminated	
Indonesia	Tarakan	Juwata Airport	Terminated	
Indonesia	Ternate	Sultan Babullah Airport		
Indonesia	Timika	Mozes Kilangin Airport		
Indonesia	Toli Toli	Sultan Bantilan Airport	Terminated	
Indonesia	Waingapu	Umbu Mehang Kunda Airport		
Indonesia	Wakatobi	Matahora Airport		
Indonesia	Yogyakarta	Adisutjipto Airport	Terminated	
Indonesia	Yogyakarta	Yogyakarta International Airport		
Malaysia	Johor Bahru	Senai International Airport	Terminated	
Malaysia	Kuala Lumpur	Kuala Lumpur International Airport		
Malaysia	Kuala Lumpur	Sultan Abdul Aziz Shah Airport		
Malaysia	Penang	Penang International Airport		
Singapore	Singapore	Changi Airport		
Taiwan	Taipei	Taoyuan International Airport	Charter	
Thailand	Bangkok	Suvarnabhumi Airport		
Thailand	Phuket	Phuket International Airport		

== Services ==
TransNusa offers options to buy on board during the flight, offering food, drinks, merchandise and duty free for purchase on the aircraft. Light snacks provided on a complimentary basis have been introduced on domestic flights following the airline's transition into a medium service carrier.

== Fleet ==
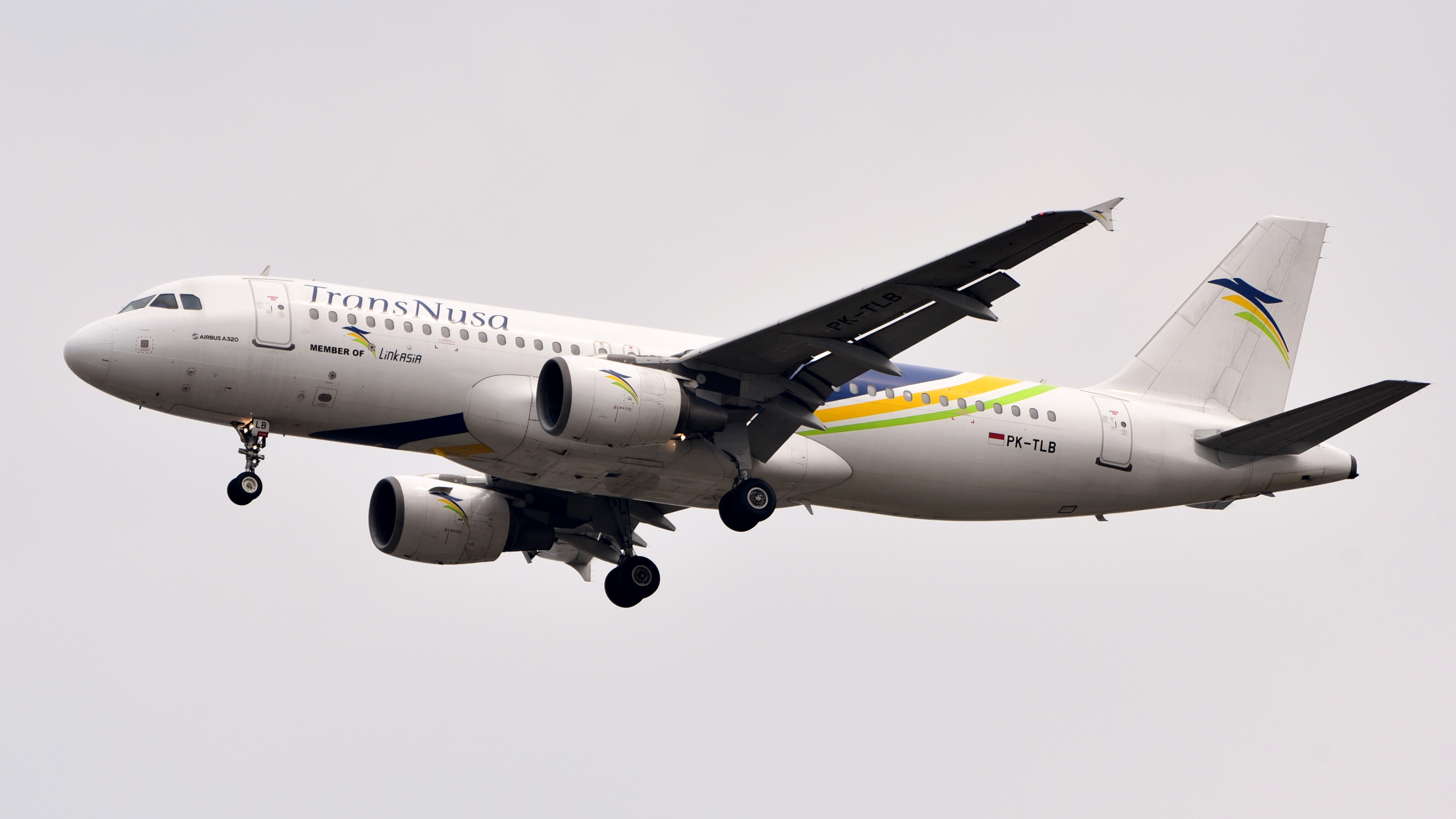
A TransNusa A320-200

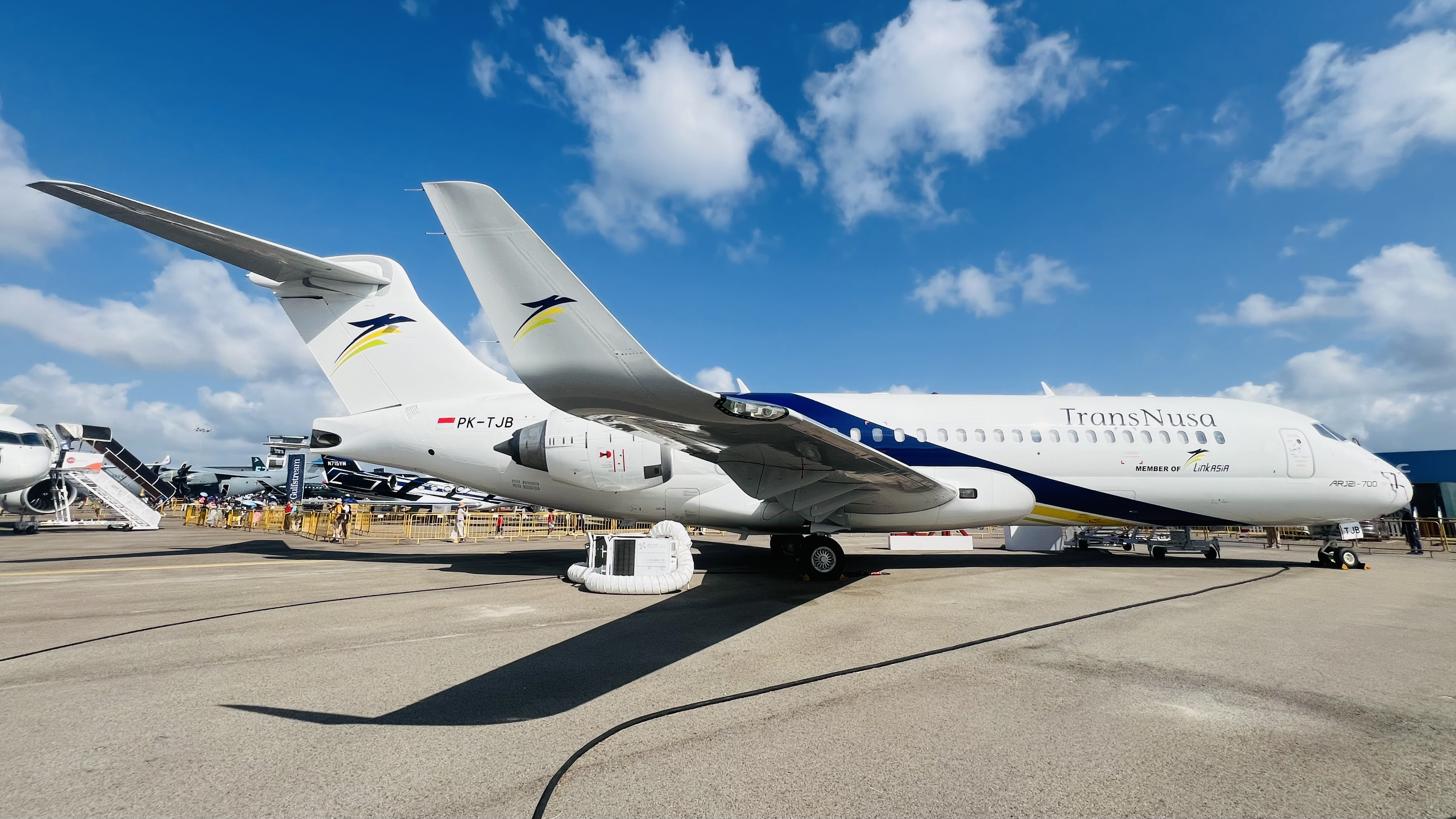
A TransNusa Comac C909 on display at the 2024 Singapore Airshow

=== Current fleet ===
As of July 2026, TransNusa operates the following aircraft:

TransNusa fleet
Aircraft	In fleet	Orders	Passengers	Notes
Airbus A320	7	—	174	
Airbus A321	3	—	195	
Comac C909	5	25	90	First non-Chinese operator.
Total	15	25		

=== Former fleet ===
As of August 2025, TransNusa operated 5 Airbus A320, 2 Airbus A321 and 6 Comac C909.

The airline also previously operated:

- 1 ATR 42-500
- 6 ATR 72-600
- 1 Fokker 50
- 1 Fokker 70
- 1 Airbus A320neo

== Incidents and accidents ==
- On 4 April 2016, a TransNusa ATR 42-600, that was being towed from one part of Halim Perdanakusuma Airport in Jakarta to another, was involved in a collision with a Batik Air Boeing 737. The Boeing 737 was on its takeoff roll when its wingtip sliced the tail off the ATR 42-600 while it was being towed across the runway. The Boeing 737's wing then caught on fire. There were no fatalities in the accident.
