= Singkawang Airport =

Airport serving Singkawang, West Kalimantan, Indonesia

Singkawang Airport Bandar Udara Singkawang
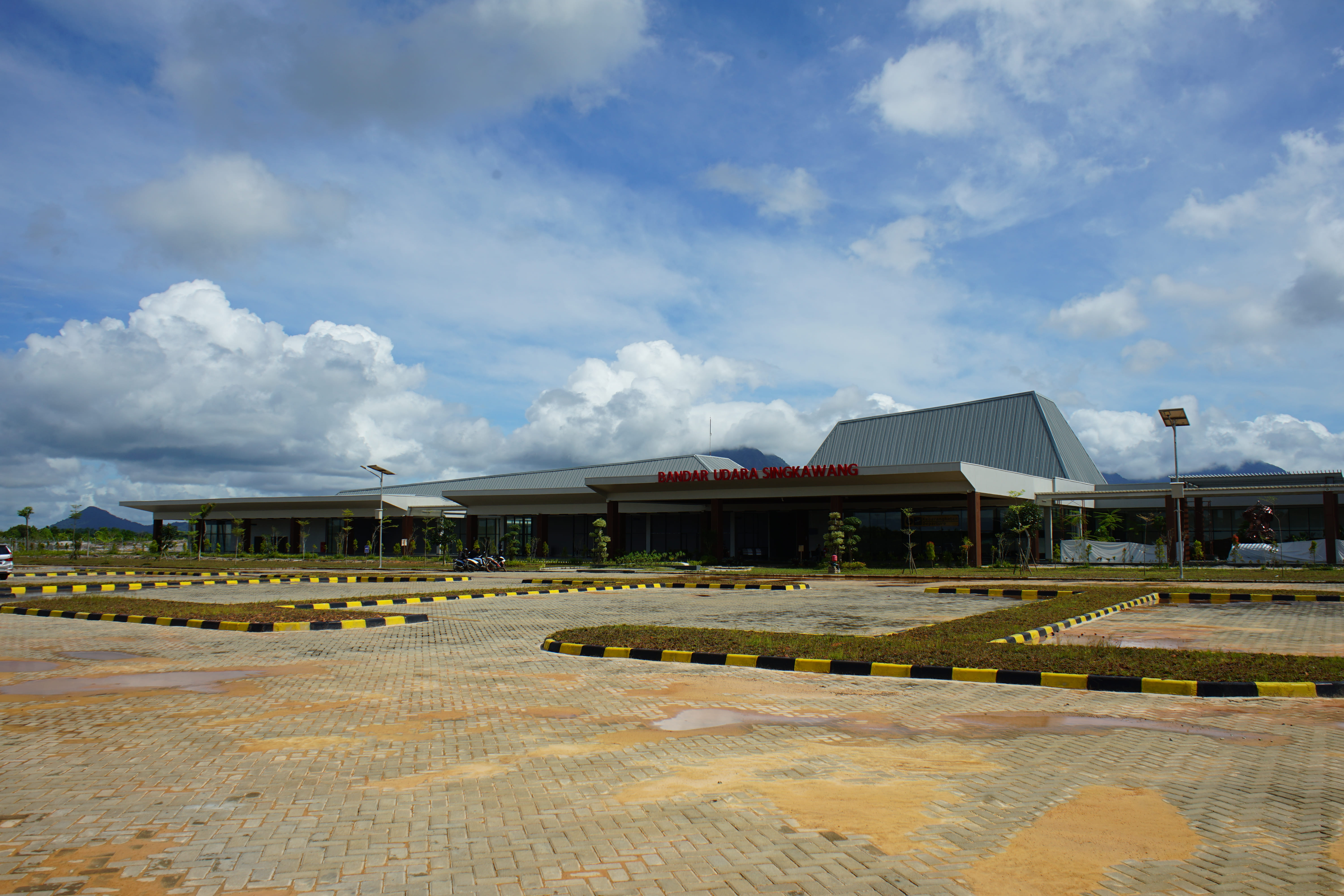
- IATA: SKJ; ICAO: WIOD

Summary
- Airport type: Public
- Owner: Government of Indonesia
- Operator: Directorate General of Civil Aviation
- Serves: Singbebas (Singkawang, Bengkayang and Sambas)
- Location: South Singkawang, Singkawang, West Kalimantan, Indonesia
- Opened: 18 April 2024; 2 years ago
- Time zone: WIB (UTC+07:00)
- Elevation AMSL: 10 ft (3.0 m)
- Coordinates: 00°47′54.5″N 108°57′26.4″E

Map
- Location in Kalimantan Location in Indonesia

Runways
Direction	Length		Surface
Direction	m	ft	Surface
16/34	2,000	6,562	Asphalt

Statistics (2024)
- Passengers: 32,500
- Cargo (tonnes): N/A
- Aircraft movements: 32
- Source: DGCA

Singkawang Airport (IATA: SKJ, ICAO: WIOD) is a domestic airport serving the city of Singkawang in West Kalimantan, Indonesia. The airport is located in Pangmilang Subdistrict, South Singkawang District, approximately 13 km (8.1 mi) south of the city center. It is intended to serve the wider Singbebas area, comprising Singkawang, Bengkayang Regency, and Sambas Regency. The airport began operations in 2024 and is also intended to serve as an alternative to Supadio International Airport in Pontianak, the provincial capital of West Kalimantan. The development of Singkawang Airport is expected to help alleviate pressure on Supadio International Airport, which has faced increasing passenger demand and growing capacity constraints.

Flight operations at Singkawang Airport remain relatively limited. As of 2026, the airport is served by a single scheduled route to Jakarta, operated by two airlines, Super Air Jet and TransNusa. Despite its limited current services, the airport is expected to play a greater role in improving air connectivity for Singkawang and the surrounding Singbebas region as passenger demand and flight frequencies increase.

== History ==
=== Construction and inauguration ===
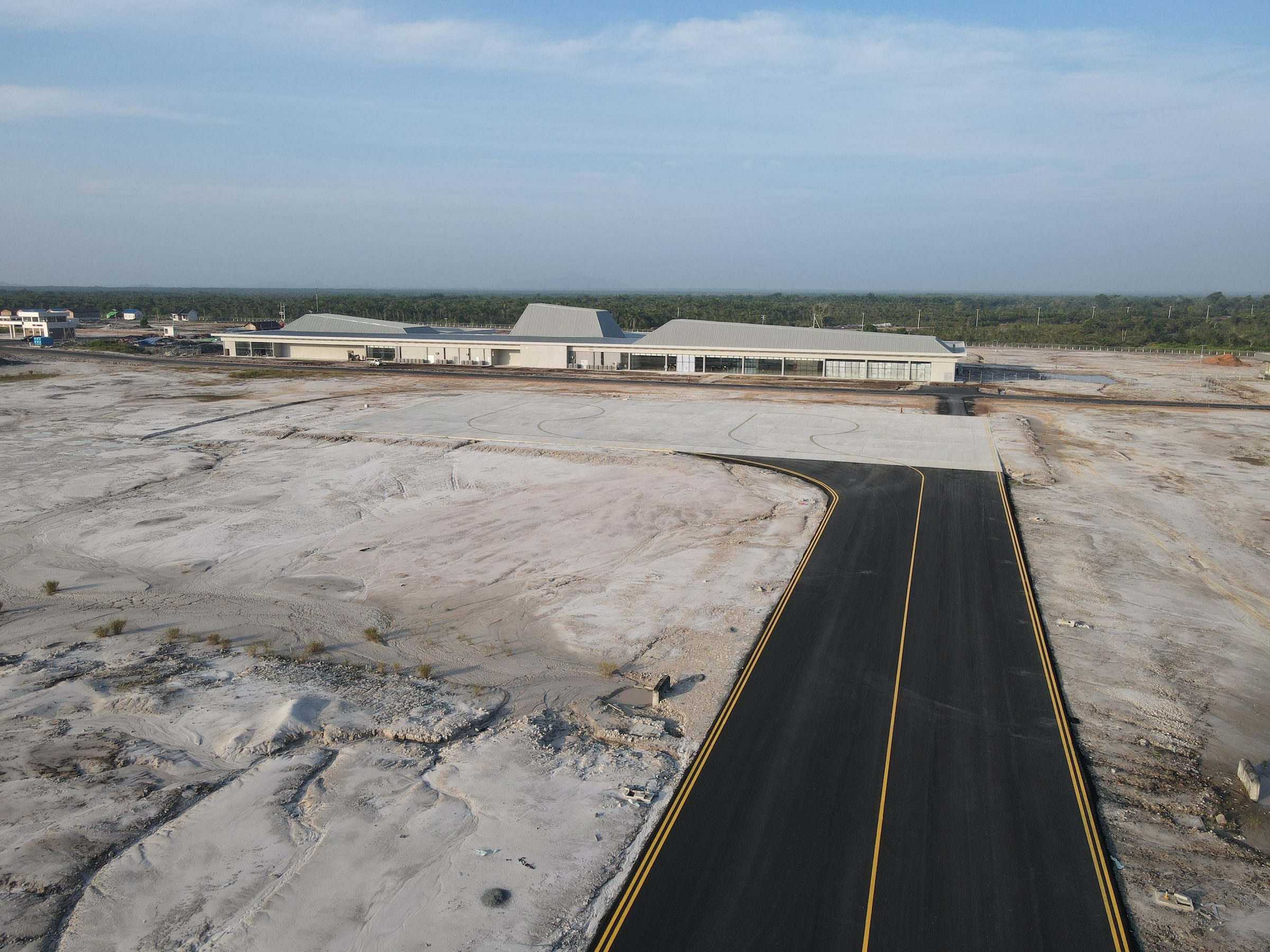
Apron view of the airport compound

Supadio International Airport in Pontianak, the primary airport serving West Kalimantan, has faced increasing passenger traffic and capacity constraints, compounded by limited opportunities for further expansion at its existing site. In response, the construction of a new airport in Singkawang was proposed to provide additional air connectivity to the region and support its long-term economic development. The new airport is also intended to improve accessibility to Singkawang and surrounding areas and stimulate tourism, particularly during major cultural events such as the annual Cap Go Meh festival. Before the airport was constructed, visitors travelling to Singkawang by air generally had to fly to Pontianak and continue their journey by road, which could take approximately four hours. The new airport is expected to significantly reduce travel times and improve air connectivity between Singkawang and major domestic and international markets, including Taiwan, Singapore, Malaysia, and China.

This new airport aims to boost tourism, generate revenue, create employment opportunities, and foster socio-economic development in the region. Over a 32-year period, it is expected to generate 15.9 trillion rupiah (US$1.12 billion) in aeronautical revenue and 2.1 trillion rupiah in non-aeronautical revenue. In response, the mayor of Singkawang, Tjhai Chui Mie, submitted a proposal to the Ministry of Transportation in 2018 for the construction of a new airport to serve the city. The ministry approved the plan, and the process of land acquisition commenced. It completed at the end of 2018, and construction began from late 2020, and was originally expected to completed by 2023. The two state-owned airport operators, Angkasa Pura I and Angkasa Pura II, which were later merged to form InJourney Airports, expressed interest in assuming management of the airport once it became operational.

In January 2018, the Mayor of Singkawang, Tjhai Chui Mie, stated the city's administration is reviewing plans for land clearance in Semelagi Kecil village for the construction of a privately funded airport. In November 2018, the city administration has acquired 106 hectares of land for the construction of the airport.

The ground breaking ceremony for the airport is held in February 2019 by Indonesia's Minister of Transport, Budi Karya Sumadi. Construction will begin from 2020 and will be completed by 2023. Sumadi also invited the private sector to invest in the airport project in West Kalimantan via Public–private partnerships (PPP). The Ministry of Transport will sign the PPP contract in 2023.

In June 2022, it is announced that the completion of the airport will be delayed to the end of 2024. Despite these delays, the airport was completed ahead of the revised deadline and officially opened on 20 March 2024, with the inauguration presided over by then-President Joko Widodo. The total cost of constructing the airport, including both airside and landside facilities, amounted to approximately Rp272 billion, funded by the state budget, while local businessmen and investors contributed an additional Rp115 billion.

=== Contemporary history ===
On 23 November 2024, the airport began commercial operations with the inauguration of a charter service between Singkawang and Jakarta, operated by TransNusa using an Airbus A320. Initially operating as a charter service, the route was upgraded to scheduled service on 20 March 2025. Two days later, on 22 March 2025, Super Air Jet also launched scheduled service to Jakarta.

The airport plans to expand its network with additional destinations in the future. Discussions are underway with other airlines, including Pelita Air, regarding the introduction of services to Jakarta, while new routes to Yogyakarta and Surabaya are also being considered, potentially operated by Super Air Jet and TransNusa. The airport is also being prepared for potential international status in the future, which would enable it to accommodate international flights. Several international routes have been proposed, including a potential service to Kuching in Sarawak, Malaysia.

In August 2026, the airport was forced to close for several days due to haze caused by forest fires. As a result, all flights to and from the airport were cancelled because of poor visibility.

== Facilities and development ==
=== Terminal ===
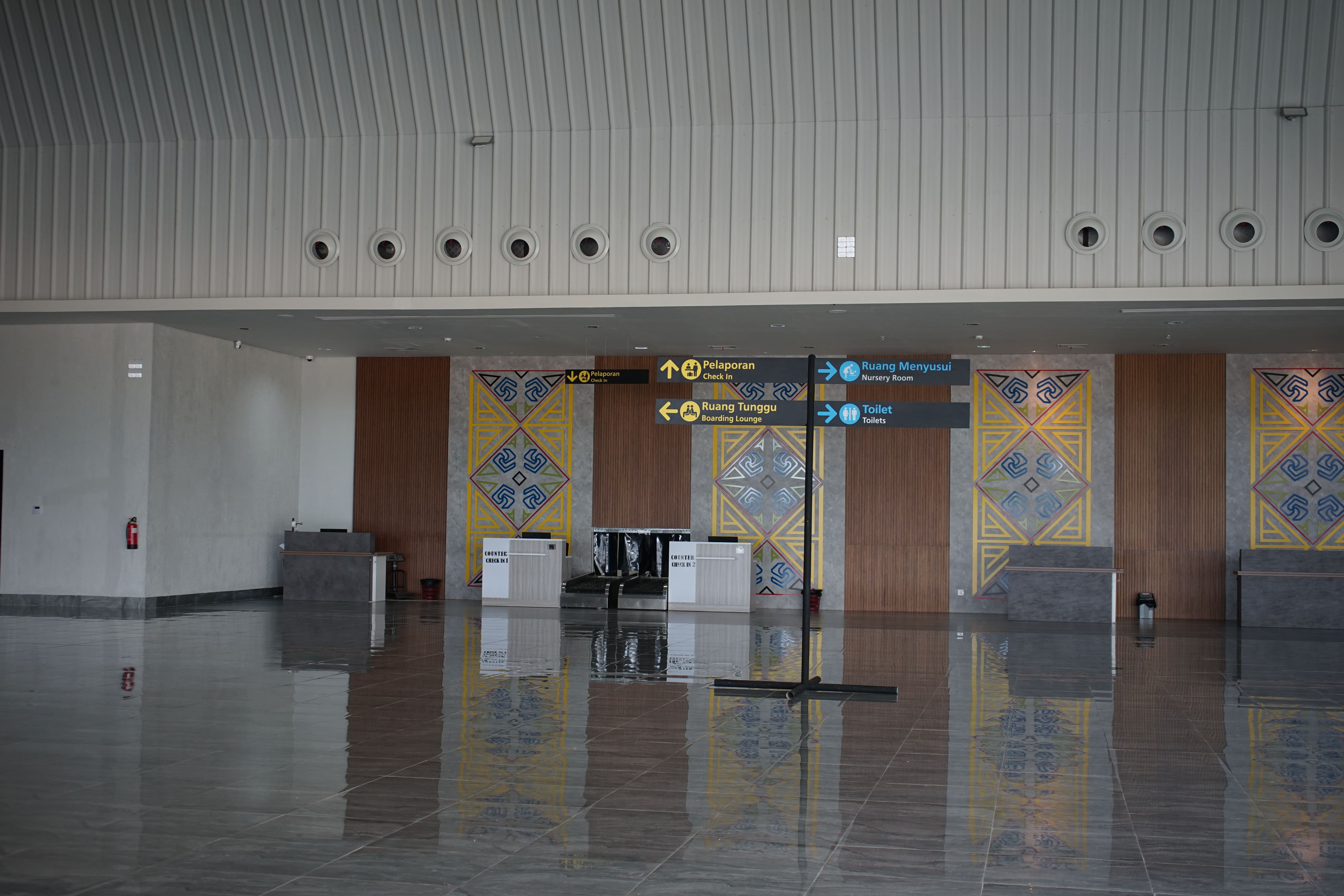
Check-in counters

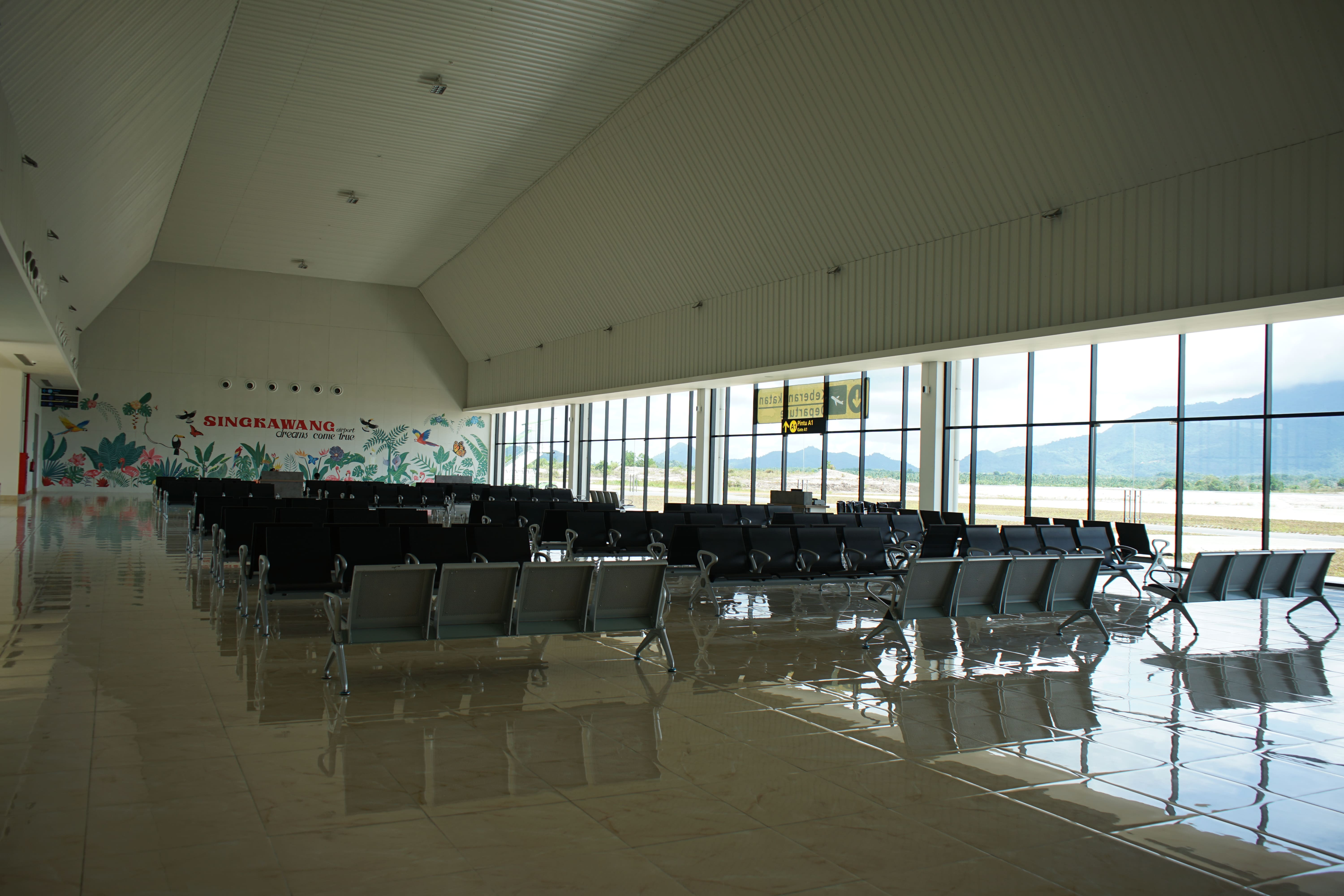
Boarding gate

The airport is built on a 151.5-hectare site, with the passenger terminal covering approximately 8,000 m². The terminal currently has an annual passenger handling capacity of approximately 335,800 passengers. The terminal features a distinctive architectural concept that incorporates elements inspired by the area's natural and cultural heritage. The exterior design draws inspiration from the three mountains surrounding the airport: Mount Raya, Mount Pasi, and Mount Poteng. Meanwhile, the interior incorporates the Tidayu batik motif, symbolizing harmony and balance between life and nature. Its principal decorative elements include the phoenix, hornbill, and seahorse, reflecting the cultural heritage and ethnic diversity of Singkawang. The passenger terminal was constructed using corporate social responsibility (CSR) funding, while the airport's 312 m² cargo terminal was financed through the national budget (APBN).

=== Runway and other airside facilities ===
On the airside, the airport has a single runway measuring 2,000 m × 30 m, capable of accommodating narrow-body aircraft such as the Boeing 737 and Airbus A320. The runway was initially 1,400 m long before being extended to its current length using corporate social responsibility (CSR) funding. The airport is also equipped with a 200 m × 18 m taxiway and a 100 m × 50 m apron. The runway is planned to be further extended to a maximum length of 2,600 m. The apron is also planned to be expanded to accommodate additional aircraft, as its current capacity is considered insufficient to handle the projected increase in flight operations. The expansion is expected to enable the apron to accommodate up to three narrow-body aircraft simultaneously. There are also plans to construct additional apron areas and taxiways, with provisions for a potential second runway to accommodate the anticipated growth in passenger traffic and flight operations in the future.

=== Other developments ===
The area surrounding the airport in Pangmilang urban village, South Singkawang District, is also being planned for development as an aerocity, which is expected to become a new center of economic growth through the expansion of service, commercial, and residential activities. The development of the aerocity is intended to stimulate new economic activity around the airport and create additional business opportunities for the local community.

== Airlines and destinations ==
=== Passenger ===
Airlines	Destinations
Super Air Jet	Jakarta–Soekarno-Hatta
TransNusa	Jakarta–Soekarno-Hatta

== Statistics ==
Annual passenger numbers and aircraft statistics
Year	Passengers handled	Passenger % change	Cargo (tonnes)	Cargo % change	Aircraft movements	Aircraft % change
2024	32,500	Steady	N/A	Steady	32	Steady
^{Source: DGCA, BPS}
