= Lembata Regency =

Regency in East Nusa Tenggara, Indonesia

Lembata Regency Kabupaten Lembata
- Regency
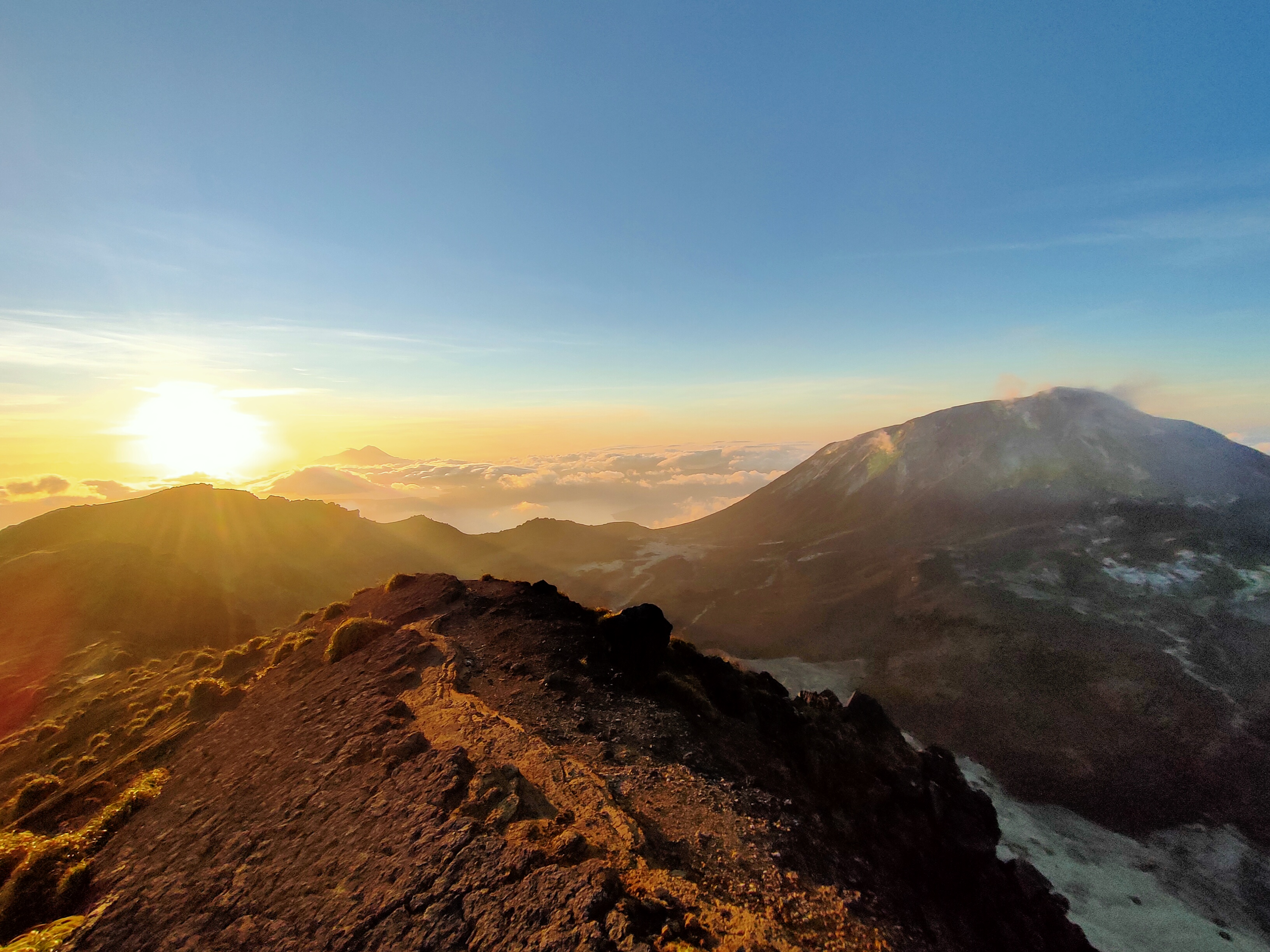
- the peak of Mount Ile Lewotolok

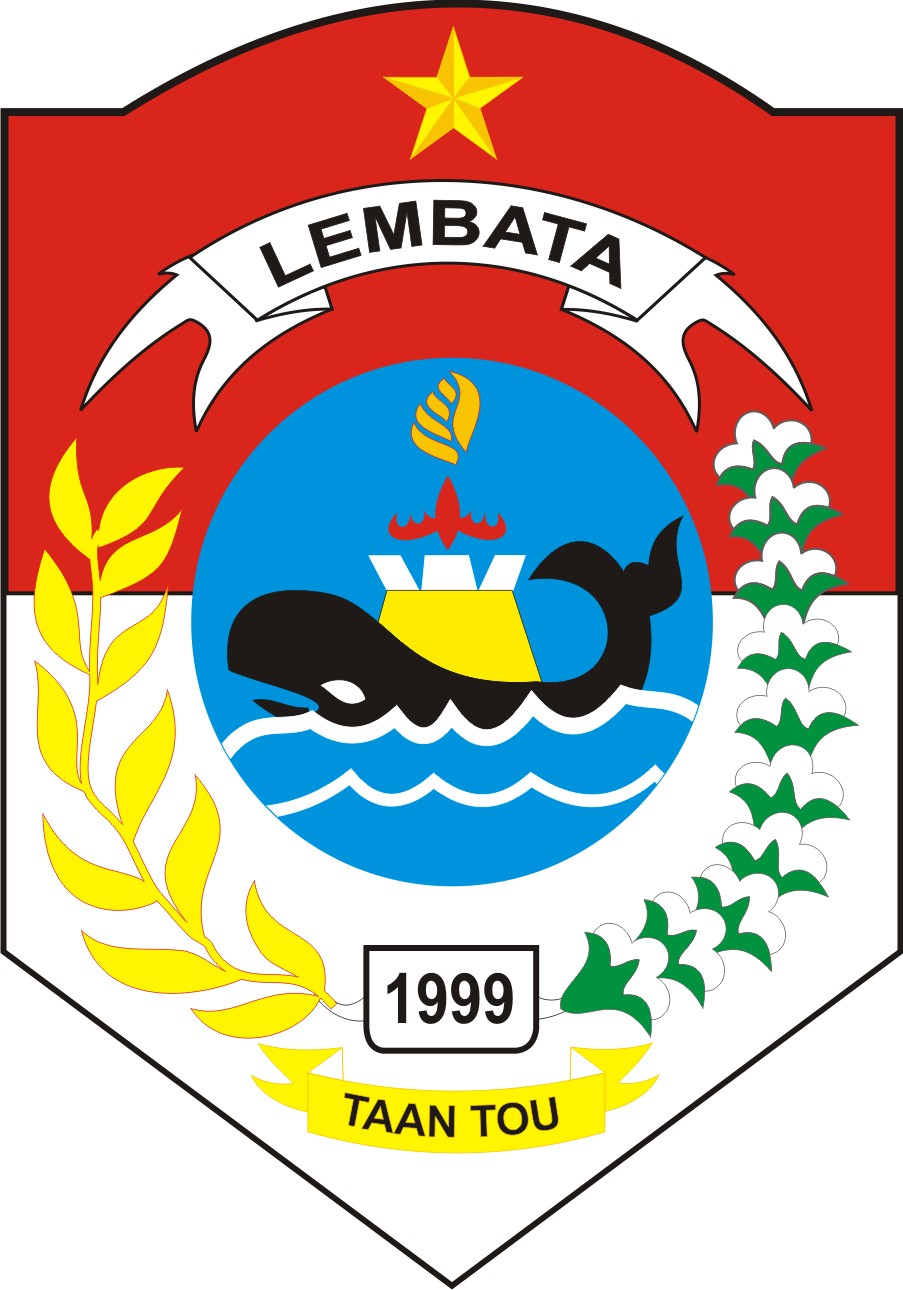
- Coat of arms

- Location within East Nusa Tenggara

- Location in Lesser Sunda Islands and Indonesia Lembata Regency (Indonesia)
- Coordinates: 8.4330°S 123.4670°E
- Country: Indonesia
- Province: East Nusa Tenggara
- Capital: Lewoleba

Government
  - Regent: Petrus Kanisius Tuaq
  - Vice Regent: Muhamad Nasir

Area
  - Total: 1,266.39 km^{2} (488.96 sq mi)

Population (mid 2025 estimate)
  - Total: 145,271
  - Density: 114.713/km^{2} (297.104/sq mi)
- Area code: (+62) 383
- Website: lembatakab.go.id

Lembata Regency is a regency in East Nusa Tenggara province of Indonesia. Established on 4 October 1999 (under administrative Law UU 52/1999) from the most easterly part of East Flores Regency, the regency covers the island of Lembata (formerly known as Lomblen), together with three small offshore islands, forming the eastern part of the Solor Archipelago, and has its administrative seat (capital) in the town of Lewoleba. The population of the Regency was 117,829 at the 2010 decennial census and at the 2020 census was 135,930; the official estimate as of mid-2025 was 145,271 (comprising 70,452 males and 74,819 females).

== Administrative districts ==
The regency is divided into nine districts (kecamatan), tabulated below with their areas and their populations at the 2010 census and 2020 census, together with the official estimates as of mid-2025. The table also includes the location of the district headquarters, the number of administrative villages in each district (totaling 144 rural desa and 7 urban kelurahan - the latter all in Nubatukan District), and its post code.

Kode Wilayah	Name of District (kecamatan)	Location	Area in km^{2}	Pop'n census 2010	Pop'n census 2020	Pop'n estimate mid 2025	Admin centre	No. of villages	Post codes
53.13.01	Nagawutung ^{(a)}	(Southwest Lembata)	185.70	8,735	10,120	10,824	Loang	18	86684
53.13.08	Wulandoni ^{(b)}	(South Lembata)	121.44	8,375	9,020	9,321	Wulandoni	15	86686
53.13.02	Atadei	(Southeast Lembata)	150.42	7,537	7,700	7,751	Kalikasa	15	86685
53.13.03	Ile Ape	(Northwest Lembata)	96.86	11,499	13,150	13,976	Waipukang	17	86683
53.13.09	Ile Ape Timur	(East Ile Ape)	38.26	5,099	5,880	6,277	Lamaau	9	86687
53.13.04	Lebatukan	(Central Lembata)	241.90	8,550	9,770	10,380	Hadakewa	17	86681
53.13.05	Nubatukan ^{(c)}	(West Lembata)	165.64	33,236	40,200	43,931	Lewoleba	18	^{(d)}
53.13.06	Omesuri	(East Lembata)	161.91	15,919	18,830	20,356	Balauring	22	86691
53.13.07	Buyasuri	(Far East Lembata)	104.26	18,879	21,270	22,455	Wairiang	20	86692
	Total island		1,266.39	117,829	135,930	145,271	Lewoleba	151	

Notes: (a) includes offshore island of Pulau Sewanggi. (b) includes offshore islands of Batutara and Watonubi.
(c) includes regency administrative centre of Lewoleba town, which covers 44.62 km^{2} with a population of 29,376 in mid 2025.
(d) of the seven kelurahan, Lewoleba has a postcode of 86611, Lewoleba Utara of 86612, Lewoleba Barat of 86613, Lewoleba Tengah of 86615, Lewoleba Timur (and the desa of Lite Ulu Mado) of 86616, while Lewoleba Selatan and Selandoro, together with the remaining ten desa, share the postcode of 86682.

Nagawutung District comprises the 18 desa of Atawai, Babokerong, Baobolak, Belabaja, Boli Bean, Duawutun, Idalolong, Ile Boli, Labalimut, Liwulagang, Lolong, Lusiduawutun, Pasir Putih, Penikene, Ria Bao, Tewaowutung, Warawatung and Wuakerong.
Wulandoni District comprises the 15 desa of Alap Atadei, Atakera, Ataili, Belobao, Imulolong, Lamalera A, Lamalera B, Lelata, Leworaja, Pantai Harapan, Puor, Puor B, Posiwatu, Tapobali and Wulandoni.
Atadei District comprises the 15 desa of Atakore, Dori Pewut, Dulir, Ile Kerbau, Ile Kimok, Katakeja, Nubaboli, Lebaata, Lerek, Lusilame, Nogo Doni, Nuba Atalojo, Nubahaeraka, Tubuk Rajan and Lewogroma.
Ile Ape District comprises the 17 desa of Amakaka, Beutaran, Bungamuda, Dulitukan, Kolipadan, Kolontobo, Lamawara, Laranwuntun, Muruona, Napasabok, Petuntawa, Plilolon, Riangbao, Tagawiti, Tanjung Batu, Waowala and Watodiri.
Ile Ape Timur District comprises the 9 desa of Aulesa, Bao Lai Duli, Jontona, Lamaau, Lamagute, Lamatokan, Lamawolo, Todanara and Waimatan.
Lebatukan District comprises the 17 desa of Atakowa, Baopana, Balurebong, Banitobo, Dikesare, Hadakewa, Lamadale, Lamalela, Lamatuka, Lerahinga, Lewoeleng, Lodotodokowa, Merdeka, Seranggorang, Tapobaran, Tapolangu and Waienga.
Nubatukan District comprises the 7 kelurahan of Lewoleba, Lewoleba Barat, Lewoleba Selatan, Lewoleba Tengah, Lewoleba Timur, Lewoleba Utara and Selandoro, plus the 11 desa of Bakalerek, Baolangu, Belobatang, Bour, Lite Ulumado, Nuba Mado, Pada, Paubokol, Udak Melomata, Waijarang and Watokobu.
Omesuri District comprises the 22 desa of Aramengi, Balauring, Dolulolong, Hingalamamengi, Hoelea, Hoelea II, Lebewala, Leubatang, Leudanung, Leuwayang, Mahal, Mahal II, Meluwiting, Meluwiting I, Nilanapo, Normal, Normal I, Peusawah, Roma, Wailolong, Walangsawah and Wowong.
Buyasuri District comprises the 20 desa of Atu Wa'lupang, Atulaleng, Bareng, Bean, Benihading I, Benihading II, Buriwutung, Kalikur, Kalikur WL, Kaohua, Leuburi, Leuwohung, Loyobohor, Mampir, Panama, Roho, Rumang, Tobotani, Tubung Walang and Umaleu.

== Geography ==
Ile Ape forms a large peninsula in the northwest of Lembata Island; its two districts cover some 135 km^{2} and have about 20,000 inhabitants. The peninsula includes Mount Ile Lewotolok, an active volcano; in November 2020 it erupted, leading to the evacuation of over 4,000 people from areas close to the volcano.

== Transport ==
Wunopito Airport is situated to the east of Lewoleba, near the road leading to the Ile Ape peninsula. Lewoleba Hospital lies further east along this road, which continues into the peninsula and runs clockwise around the volcano before returning through the neck (isthmus) and then proceeding east to the south of the enclosed Waienga Bay and then eastwards along the island's north coast to Mount (Gunung) Uyelewun and the eastern port of Wairiang.

== Sports ==
=== Football club ===
In association football, Lembata Regency is represented by the Persebata Lembata. This club has achieved proud results for all of East Nusa Tenggara as the first club to be promoted to the Liga Nusantara from Liga 4 in the 2024–25 season. They first participated in an official event at the 1999 El Tari Memorial Cup competition in Ende Regency.

=== Sports facilities ===
In Lembata Regency, there is the Gelora 99 Stadium and the Polres Lembata Field, which in 2022 was used as venues for the 2022 El Tari Memorial Cup competition where Lembata Regency was the host.
