= Lewoleba =

- Location of Lembata in East Nusa Tenggara Province

- Location within Indonesia
- Country: Indonesia
- Region: Lesser Sunda Islands
- Province: East Nusa Tenggara
- Regency: Lembata

Area
  - Total: 44.62 km^{2} (17.23 sq mi)

Population (mid 2025 estimate)
  - Total: 29,376
  - Density: 658.4/km^{2} (1,705/sq mi)

Lewoleba is a town and also the capital of the Lembata Regency, East Nusa Tenggara province of Indonesia. It is located in Nubatukan District on Lembata Island, which comprises seven urban communities (kelurahan) in the north of the district, and eleven rural villages (desa) to the south, that together form that administrative district.

== Communities ==
Nubatukan District comprises seven urban communities (kelurahan, primarily the component parts of Lewoleba town) and eleven rural villages (desa), listed below with their areas and their populations as officially estimated for mid 2025, together with their postcodes.

Kode Wilayah	Name of kelurahan or desa	Area in km^{2}	Pop'n Estimate mid 2025◎	Post code
53.13.05.1001	Lewoleba	7.00	4,170	86611
53.13.05.1002	Lewolela Timur	14.40	4,997	86616
53.13.05.1003	Lewoleba Tengah	6.18	3,471	86615
53.13.05.1004	Lewoleba Utara	3.14	3,546	86612
53.13.05.1015	Selandoro	7.20	6,286	86682
53.13.05.1016	Lewoleba Selatan	3.15	2,888	86682
53.13.05.1017	Lewoleba Barat	3.55	4,018	86613
53.13.05	Sub-total Lewoleba town	44.62	29,376	
53.13.05.2006	Baolangu	16.68	850	86682
53.13.05.2007	Nuba Mado	8.35	448	86682
53.13.05.2008	Watokobu	18.00	897	86682
53.13.05.2009	Belobatang	19.80	411	86682
53.13.05.2010	Waijarang	10.00	838	86682
53.13.05.2011	Udak Melomata	9.90	291	86682
53.13.05.2012	Paobokol	8.88	374	86682
53.13.05.2013	Pada	11.32	1,603	86682
53.13.05.2014	Liteulumado	5.80	290	86616
53.13.05.2018	Bakalerek	10.43	384	86682
53.13.05.2019	Bour	18.00	448	86682
53.13.05	Total Nubatukan District	181.78	36,210	

== Transportation ==
The town is served by Wonopito Airport.

== Climate ==
Lewoleba has a tropical savanna climate (Aw) with long dry season and short wet season.

Climate data for Lewoleba
Month	Jan	Feb	Mar	Apr	May	Jun	Jul	Aug	Sep	Oct	Nov	Dec	Year
Mean daily maximum °C (°F)	30.1 (86.2)	29.8 (85.6)	30.2 (86.4)	31.0 (87.8)	31.2 (88.2)	30.7 (87.3)	30.3 (86.5)	30.4 (86.7)	30.7 (87.3)	31.2 (88.2)	31.5 (88.7)	30.6 (87.1)	30.6 (87.2)
Daily mean °C (°F)	26.8 (80.2)	26.5 (79.7)	26.5 (79.7)	26.8 (80.2)	26.9 (80.4)	26.3 (79.3)	25.5 (77.9)	25.4 (77.7)	25.8 (78.4)	26.6 (79.9)	27.7 (81.9)	27.2 (81.0)	26.5 (79.7)
Mean daily minimum °C (°F)	23.6 (74.5)	23.2 (73.8)	22.9 (73.2)	22.7 (72.9)	22.6 (72.7)	21.9 (71.4)	20.8 (69.4)	20.5 (68.9)	20.9 (69.6)	22.1 (71.8)	23.9 (75.0)	23.9 (75.0)	22.4 (72.4)
Average rainfall mm (inches)	251 (9.9)	219 (8.6)	198 (7.8)	98 (3.9)	45 (1.8)	28 (1.1)	15 (0.6)	5 (0.2)	4 (0.2)	28 (1.1)	91 (3.6)	176 (6.9)	1,158 (45.7)
Source: Climate-Data.org
