= Mount Ile Lewotolok =

Volcano in Indonesia

Ile Lewotolok
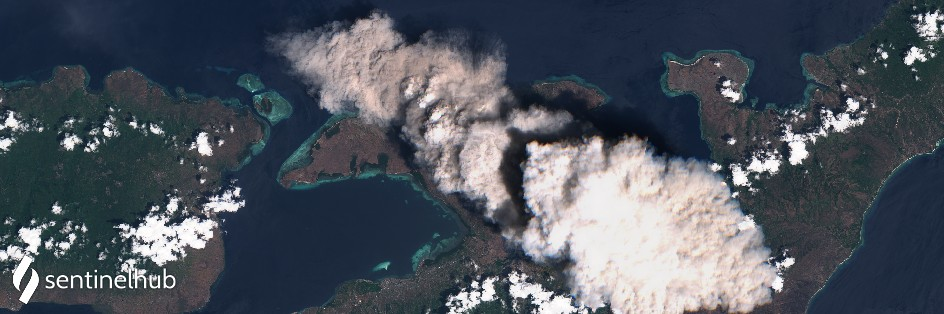
- The 2020 eruption as captured by ESA Sentinel-2 on 29 November

Highest point
- Elevation: 1,455 m (4,774 ft)
- Prominence: 1,421 m (4,662 ft)
- Listing: Ribu
- Coordinates: 8.272°S 123.505°E

Geography
- Location within Indonesia
- Location: Lembata Island, East Nusa Tenggara, Indonesia

Geology
- Mountain type: Stratovolcano
- Volcanic arc: Sunda Arc
- Last eruption: September 2026

Mount Ile Lewotolok or Lewotolo (Indonesian: Gunung Lewotolok), or Gunung Api Lewotolok ("Lewotolok Fire Mountain"), is a stratovolcano in the north-central part of the island of Lembata in the Province of East Nusa Tenggara in Indonesia. Its most recent eruption was in September 2026.

== 2020 eruptions ==
On 27 November, an eruption occurred at 5:57 a.m. local time (21:57 UTC), which generated an ash column that rose to an altitude 500 meters into the sky. On 29 November, two days later, a major blast took place sending an ash column as high as 50000 ft (15.24 km) into the sky. Volcanic bombs have an impact radius of about 2 km from the main crater.

By 2 December, it was reported that more than 5,500 people had been evacuated from their homes near the volcano. Residents on the slopes of Mt Ile Lewotolok had been warned of potential cold lava flows, especially during periods of heavy rain, and had been advised to remain outside of a 4-kilometre (2.5 mi) radius from the crater.

== See also ==
- List of volcanoes in Indonesia
