= Directorate General of Civil Aviation (Indonesia) =

Government agency of Indonesia

- Direktorat Jenderal Perhubungan Udara
- Emblem of the Indonesian Ministry of Transportation

Agency overview
- Type: Directorate General at Ministry
- Jurisdiction: Indonesia
- Headquarters: Jakarta, Gedung Karsa Lantai 5 Departemen Perhubungan
- Agency executive: Suprasetyo, Director General of Civil Aviation
- Parent agency: Ministry of Transportation
- Child agencies: Secretariate of the Directorate General of Civil Aviation; Directorate of Airports; Directorate of Air Transport; Directorate of Aviation Security; Directorate of Air Navigation; Directorate of Airworthiness and Operation
- Website: hubud.dephub.go.id/hubud/website_en/

The Directorate General of Civil Aviation (Indonesian: Direktorat Jenderal Perhubungan Udara, lit. 'Directorate General of Air Transportation') is a Directorate General under the control of the Ministry of Transportation of the Republic of Indonesia, which oversees the administration of civil aviation throughout the nation. The office of the Directorate General of Civil Aviation oversees all government regulations pertaining to civil aviation and the Aviation Act (Undang Undang Nomor 1 Tahun 2009 Tentang Penerbangan). Its headquarters is in Jakarta.

== History ==
The history of aviation in Indonesia can be traced back to 1913, when J.W.E.R. Hilger commenced a demo flight in Surabaya using a Fokker-made Spin aircraft. The flight was unsuccessful, but the aviator, Hilger, survived the crash.

First route of the Netherlands to Dutch East Indies opened on 1 October 1924, started from Schiphol Airport to Cililitan Airport (now Halim Perdanakusuma International Airport). On 1 November 1928, Koninklijke Nederlandsch-Indische Luchtvaart Maatschappij (KNILM) established as Dutch East Indies aviation company, supported with Koninklijke Luchtvaart Maatschappij (KLM) and Dutch East Indies government, and other Dutch companies operated in Dutch East Indies. On 1929, KLM started to operate scheduled flights across Dutch East Indies.

For much of its existence, those companies operated flights and regulated civilian flights in Dutch East Indies until 25 December 1949, when a KLM representative, Dr. Konijnenburg, met Sukarno in Yogyakarta and relinquished KLM Interinsulair Bedrijf which was formed after KNILM dissolution in 1947, to Indonesian government as follow up of the Round Table Conference. While much of the KLM Interinsulair Bedrijf later transformed to Garuda Indonesian Airways, part of it transformed to civilian flight regulatory authority called Djawatan Penerbangan Sipil (Civil Aviation Service) in 1952. It later elevated to a directorate-level Directorate of Civil Aviation in 1963 within the Ministry of Transportation, and finally to Directorate General of Civil Aviation in 1969. The Directorate General of Civil Aviation experienced several times of structural expansion, with the current form of the structure being established in 1991.

To support the Directorate General work, a network of air navigational aid system, SENOPEN (Sentra Operasi Keselamatan Penerbangan, Air Safety Operation Center), opened in 1978 with 7 offices across Indonesia.

== Structure ==
Ministry of Transportation

- The Directorate General of Civil Aviation (Direktorat Jenderal Perhubungan Udara)
  - Secretariat of the Directorate General of Civil Aviation
  - Directorate of Air Transport
  - Directorate of Airports
  - Directorate of Aviation Security
  - Directorate of Air Navigation
  - Directorate of Airworthiness and Operation

== Functions ==
- Fulfilling standard of safety, security and service to the aviation industry
- Providing infrastructure and a reliable, optimum and integrated air transportation network
- Facilitation of a competitive and sustainable aviation service business
- To provide effective and efficient organisational support, manage the available resources of the agency and deliver comprehensive regulation and enforcement

=== Task ===
The Directorate General of Civil Aviation shall perform the following functions :

- Preparing the formulation of policies of the Ministry of Transportation on the field of air transportation, airports, flight security, air navigation, aircraft airworthiness and operation;
- Implementing policies on air transportation, airports, flight security, air navigation, aircraft airworthiness and operation;
- preparing standardisation, norms, guidance, criteria, system and procedures for air transportation, airports, flight security, air navigation, aircraft airworthiness and operation;
- performing certification and/or licensing on air transportation, airports, flight security, air navigation, aircraft airworthiness and operation;
- supervising (in the sense of monitoring and assessment) the implementation of policies on air transportation, airports, flight security, air *navigation, aircraft airworthiness and operation;
- controlling (in the sense of providing directives, guidance, technical guidance on the implementation of policies in air transportation, airports, flight security, air navigation, aircraft airworthiness and operation;
- law enforcement/corrective actions with respect to the implementation of policies in air transportation, airports, flight security, air navigation, aircraft airworthiness and operation;
- evaluating and reporting the implementation of policies in air transportation, airports, flight security, air navigation, aircraft airworthiness and operation;
- carrying out administrative affairs on the Directorate General of Civil Aviation

== See also ==
- National Transportation Safety Committee
- Civil aviation authority
