= X-SAMPA =

Remapping of the IPA into ASCII

The Extended Speech Assessment Methods Phonetic Alphabet (X-SAMPA) is a variant of SAMPA developed in 1995 by John C. Wells, professor of phonetics at University College London. It is designed to unify the individual-language SAMPA alphabets, and extend SAMPA to cover the entire range of characters in the 1993 version of International Phonetic Alphabet (IPA). The result is a SAMPA-inspired remapping of the IPA into 7-bit ASCII.

X-SAMPA was devised as a hack to work around the inability of text encodings to represent IPA symbols. Later, as Unicode support for IPA symbols became more widespread, the necessity for a separate, computer-readable system for representing the IPA in ASCII decreased. However, X-SAMPA is still useful as a basis for an input method for IPA.

== History ==
SAMPA was developed in the late 1980s in the European Commission-funded ESPRIT project 2589 "Speech Assessment Methods" (SAM)—hence "SAM Phonetic Alphabet"—in order to facilitate email data exchange and computational processing of transcriptions in phonetics and speech technology. As many symbols as possible were taken over from the IPA; where this is not possible, other signs that are available were used, e.g. [@] for schwa (IPA [ə]), [2] for [ø] (the vowel sound found in French deux ('two')), and [9] for [œ] (the vowel sound found in French neuf ('nine')).

SAMPA, as originally standardized, is a partial encoding of the IPA. The first version of SAMPA was the union of the sets of phoneme codes for Danish, Dutch, English, French, German and Italian; later versions extended SAMPA to cover other European languages. Since SAMPA is based on phoneme inventories, each SAMPA table is valid only in the language it was created for. In order to make this IPA encoding technique universally applicable, X-SAMPA was developed, which provides one single table without language-specific differences.

Language-specific SAMPA representations have been developed for the sounds of the following languages:

- Arabic
- Bulgarian
- Cantonese
- Czech
- Danish
- Dutch
- English (chart)
- Estonian
- French
- German
- Greek
- Hebrew
- Hungarian
- Italian
- Norwegian
- Polish
- Portuguese
- Romanian
- Russian
- Scots
- Serbo-Croatian
- Slovak
- Slovenian
- Spanish
- Swedish
- Thai
- Turkish

== Notation ==
X-SAMPA uses the ASCII notation below for IPA representation.

- The IPA symbols that are ordinary lower case letters have the same value in X-SAMPA as they do in the IPA.
- X-SAMPA uses backslashes as modifying suffixes to create new symbols. For example, s is a distinct sound from s\, which are phonologically related in many ways. Such use of the backslash character can be a problem, since many programs interpret it as an escape character for the character following it. For example, such X-SAMPA symbols do not work in EMU, so backslashes must be replaced with some other symbol (e.g., an asterisk: '*') when adding phonemic transcription to an EMU speech database. The backslash has no fixed meaning.
- X-SAMPA uses the underscore character to join following diacritics to the symbols they modify, except for ~ (nasalization), = (syllabicity), and ` (retroflexion and rhotacization), for which the underscore is optional.
- The underscore character is also used to encode the IPA tiebar: k_p codes for /k͡p/.
- The numbers _1 to _6 are reserved diacritics as shorthand for language-specific tone numbers.
- The IETF language tags registry has assigned fonxsamp as the subtag for text transcribed in X-SAMPA.

=== Lower-case symbols ===
| X-SAMPA | IPA | IPA image | Description | Examples |
|---|---|---|---|---|
| a | a | | open front unrounded vowel | French dame [dam] |
| b | b | | voiced bilabial plosive | English bed [bEd], French bon [bO~] |
| b_< | ɓ | | voiced bilabial implosive | Sindhi ɓarʊ [b_<arU] |
| c | c | | voiceless palatal plosive | Hungarian latyak ["lQcQk] |
| d | d | | voiced alveolar plosive | English dig [dIg], French doigt [dwa] |
| d` | ɖ | | voiced retroflex plosive | Swedish hord [hu:d`] |
| d_< | ɗ | | voiced alveolar implosive | Sindhi ɗarʊ [d_<arU] |
| e | e | | close-mid front unrounded vowel | French blé [ble] |
| f | f | | voiceless labiodental fricative | English five [faIv], French femme [fam] |
| g | ɡ | | voiced velar plosive | English game [geIm], French longue [lO~g] |
| g_< | ɠ | | voiced velar implosive | Sindhi ɠəro [g_<@ro] |
| h | h | | voiceless glottal fricative | English house [haUs] |
| h\ | ɦ | | voiced glottal fricative | Czech hrad [h\rat] |
| i | i | | close front unrounded vowel | English be [bi:], French oui [wi], Spanish si [si] |
| j | j | | palatal approximant | English yes [jEs], French yeux [j2] |
| j\ | ʝ | | voiced palatal fricative | Greek γειά [j\a] |
| k | k | | voiceless velar plosive | English skip [skIp], Spanish carro ["karo] |
| l | l | | alveolar lateral approximant | English lay [leI], French mal [mal] |
| l` | ɭ | | retroflex lateral approximant | Svealand Swedish sorl [so:l`] |
| l\ | ɺ | | alveolar lateral flap | Wayuu püülükü [pM:l\MkM] |
| m | m | | bilabial nasal | English mouse [maUs], French homme [Om] |
| n | n | | alveolar nasal | English nap [n{p], French non [nO~] |
| n` | ɳ | | retroflex nasal | Swedish hörn [h2:n`] |
| o | o | | close-mid back rounded vowel | French veau [vo] |
| p | p | | voiceless bilabial plosive | English speak [spik], French pose [poz], Spanish perro ["pero] |
| p\ | ɸ | | voiceless bilabial fricative | Japanese fuku [p\M_0kM] |
| q | q | | voiceless uvular plosive | Arabic qasbah ["qQs_Gba] |
| r | r | | alveolar trill | Spanish perro ["pero] |
| r` | ɽ | | retroflex flap | Bengali gari [gar`i:] |
| r\ | ɹ | | alveolar approximant | English red [r\Ed] |
| r\` | ɻ | | retroflex approximant | Malayalam വഴി ["v@r\`i] |
| s | s | | voiceless alveolar fricative | English seem [si:m], French session [sE"sjO~] |
| s` | ʂ | | voiceless retroflex fricative | Swedish mars [mas`] |
| s\ | ɕ | | voiceless alveolo-palatal fricative | Polish świerszcz [s\v'ers`ts`] |
| t | t | | voiceless alveolar plosive | English stew [stju:], French raté [Ra"te] |
| t` | ʈ | | voiceless retroflex plosive | Swedish mört [m2t`] |
| u | u | | close back rounded vowel | English boom [bu:m], Spanish su [su] |
| v | v | | voiced labiodental fricative | English vest [vEst], French voix [vwa] |
| v\ (or P) | ʋ | | labiodental approximant | Dutch west [v\Est]/[PEst] |
| w | w | | labial-velar approximant | English west [wEst], French oui [wi] |
| x | x | | voiceless velar fricative | Scots loch [lOx] or [5Ox]; German Buch, Dach; Spanish caja, gestión |
| x\ | ɧ | | voiceless palatal-velar fricative | Swedish sjal [x\A:l] |
| y | y | | close front rounded vowel | French tu [ty] German über ["y:b6] |
| z | z | | voiced alveolar fricative | English zoo [zu:], French azote [a"zOt] |
| z` | ʐ | | voiced retroflex fricative | Mandarin Chinese rang [z`aN] |
| z\ | ʑ | | voiced alveolo-palatal fricative | Polish źrebak ["z\rEbak] |

=== Upper-case symbols ===
| X-SAMPA | IPA | IPA image | Description | Example |
|---|---|---|---|---|
| A | ɑ | | open back unrounded vowel | English father ["fA:D@(r\)] (RP and Gen.Am.) |
| B | β | | voiced bilabial fricative | Spanish lavar [la"Ba4] |
| B\ | ʙ | | bilabial trill | Medumba mʙʉ [mB\}_H] |
| C | ç | | voiceless palatal fricative | German ich [IC], English human ["Cjum@n] (broad transcription uses [hj-]) |
| D | ð | | voiced dental fricative | English then [DEn] |
| E | ɛ | | open-mid front unrounded vowel | French même [mE:m], English met [mEt] (RP and Gen.Am.) |
| F | ɱ | | labiodental nasal | English emphasis ["EFf@sIs] (spoken quickly, otherwise uses [Emf-]) |
| G | ɣ | | voiced velar fricative | Greek γωνία [Go"nia] |
| G\ | ɢ | | voiced uvular plosive | Inuktitut nirivvik [niG\ivvik] |
| G\_< | ʛ | | voiced uvular implosive | Mam ʛa [G\_<a] |
| H | ɥ | | labial-palatal approximant | French huit [Hit] |
| H\ | ʜ | | voiceless epiglottal fricative | Agul мехӀ [mEH\] |
| I | ɪ | | near-close front unrounded vowel | English kit [kIt] |
| I\ | ᵻ | | near-close central unrounded vowel (non-IPA) | Polish ryba [rI\bA] |
| J | ɲ | | palatal nasal | Spanish año ["aJo], English canyon ["k{J@n] (broad transcription uses [-nj-]) |
| J\ | ɟ | | voiced palatal plosive | Hungarian egy [EJ\] |
| J\_< | ʄ | | voiced palatal implosive | Sindhi ʄaro [J\_<aro] |
| K | ɬ | | voiceless alveolar lateral fricative | Welsh llaw [KaU] |
| K\ | ɮ | | voiced alveolar lateral fricative | Mongolian долоо [tOK\O:] |
| L | ʎ | | palatal lateral approximant | Italian famiglia [fa"miLLa], Castilian: llamar [La"mar] |
| L\ | ʟ | | velar lateral approximant | Korean 달구지 [t6L\gudz\i] |
| M | ɯ | | close back unrounded vowel | Korean 음식 [M:ms\_hik_}] |
| M\ | ɰ | | velar approximant | Spanish fuego ["fweM\o] |
| N | ŋ | | velar nasal | English thing [TIN] |
| N\ | ɴ | | uvular nasal | Japanese さん san [saN\] |
| O | ɔ | | open-mid back rounded vowel | American English off [O:f] |
| O\ | ʘ | | bilabial click | |
| P (or v\) | ʋ | | labiodental approximant | Dutch west [PEst]/[v\Est], allophone of English phoneme /r\/ |
| Q | ɒ | | open back rounded vowel | RP lot [lQt] |
| R | ʁ | | voiced uvular fricative | German rein [RaIn] |
| R\ | ʀ | | uvular trill | French roi [R\wa] |
| S | ʃ | | voiceless postalveolar fricative | English ship [SIp] |
| T | θ | | voiceless dental fricative | English thin [TIn] |
| U | ʊ | | near-close back rounded vowel | English foot [fUt] |
| U\ | ᵿ | | near-close central rounded vowel (non-IPA) | English euphoria [jU\"fO@r\i@] |
| V | ʌ | | open-mid back unrounded vowel | Scottish English strut [str\Vt] |
| W | ʍ | | voiceless labial-velar fricative | Scots when [WEn] |
| X | χ | | voiceless uvular fricative | Klallam sχaʔqʷaʔ [sXa?q_wa?] |
| X\ | ħ | | voiceless pharyngeal fricative | Arabic ح ḥāʾ [X\A:] |
| Y | ʏ | | near-close front rounded vowel | German hübsch [hYpS] |
| Z | ʒ | | voiced postalveolar fricative | English vision ["vIZ@n] |

=== Other symbols ===
| X-SAMPA | IPA | IPA image | Description | Example |
|---|---|---|---|---|
| . | . | | syllable break | |
| " | ˈ | | primary stress | |
| % | ˌ | | secondary stress | American English pronunciation [pr\@%nVn.si"eI.S@n] |
| ' (or _j) | ʲ | | palatalized | Russian Земля (Earth) [z'I"ml'a] or [z_jI"ml_ja] |
| : | ː | | long | |
| :\ | ˑ | | half long | Estonian differentiates three vowel lengths |
| - | | | separator | Polish trzy [t-S1] vs. czy [tS1] (affricate) |
| @ | ə | | schwa | English arena [@"r\i:n@] |
| @\ | ɘ | | close-mid central unrounded vowel | Chuvash пӗррехинче [p@\rrEXints\E] |
| @` | ɚ | | r-coloured schwa | American English color ["kVl@`] |
| { | æ | | near-open front unrounded vowel | English trap [tr\{p] |
| } | ʉ | | close central rounded vowel | Swedish sju [x\}:]; AuE/NZE boot [b}:t] |
| 1 | ɨ | | close central unrounded vowel | Welsh tu [t1], American English rose's ["r\oUz1z] |
| 2 | ø | | close-mid front rounded vowel | Danish købe ["k2:b@], French deux [d2] |
| 3 | ɜ | | open-mid central unrounded vowel | English nurse [n3:s] (RP) or [n3`s] (Gen.Am.) |
| 3\ | ɞ | | open-mid central rounded vowel | Irish tomhail [t3\:l'] |
| 4 | ɾ | | alveolar flap | Spanish pero ["pe4o], American English better ["bE4@`] |
| 5 | ɫ | | velarized alveolar lateral approximant; also see _e | English milk [mI5k], Portuguese livro ["5iv4u] |
| 6 | ɐ | | near-open central vowel | German besser ["bEs6], Australian English mud [m6d] |
| 7 | ɤ | | close-mid back unrounded vowel | Estonian kõik [k7ik], Vietnamese mơ [m7_M] |
| 8 | ɵ | | close-mid central rounded vowel | Swedish buss [b8s] |
| 9 | œ | | open-mid front rounded vowel | French neuf [n9f], Danish drømme [dR9m@] |
| & | ɶ | | open front rounded vowel | Swedish skörd [x\&d`] |
| ? | ʔ | | glottal stop | Cockney English bottle ["bQ?o] |
| ?\ | ʕ | | voiced pharyngeal fricative | Arabic ع ʿayn [?\Ajn] |
| * | | | undefined escape character, SAMPA's "conjunctor" | |
| / | / | | (a) French vowel archiphonemes or indeterminacies (b) delimiter of phonemic transcriptions | maison /mE/zO~/ |
| < | ⟨ | | begin nonsegmental notation, e.g., SAMPROSA | |
| <\ | ʢ | | voiced epiglottal fricative | Siwi arˤbˤəʢa (four) [ar_?\b_?\@<\a] |
| > | ⟩ | | end nonsegmental notation | |
| >\ | ʡ | | epiglottal plosive | Archi гӀарз (complaint) [>\arz] |
| ^ | ꜛ | | upstep | |
| ! | ꜜ | | downstep | |
| !\ | ǃ | | postalveolar click | Zulu iqaqa (polecat) [i:!\a:!\a] |
| | | | | | minor (foot) group | |
| |\ | ǀ | | dental click | Zulu icici (earring) [i:|\i:|\i] |
| || | ‖ | | major (intonation) group | |
| |\|\ | ǁ | | alveolar lateral click | Zulu xoxa (to converse) [|\|\O:|\|\a] |
| =\ | ǂ | | palatal click | Taa ǂnûm [=\~u_Fm] |
| -\ | ‿ | | linking mark | |

=== Diacritics ===
| X-SAMPA | IPA | IPA image | Description |
|---|---|---|---|
| _" | ̈ | | centralized |
| _+ | ̟ | | advanced |
| _- | ̠ | | retracted |
| _/ | ̌ | | rising tone |
| _R | ̌ | | rising tone |
| _0 | ̥ | | voiceless |
| _< | | | implosive (IPA uses separate symbols for implosives) |
| = (or _=) | ̩ | | syllabic |
| _> | ʼ | | ejective |
| _?\ | ˤ | | pharyngealized |
| _\ | ̂ | | falling tone |
| _F | ̂ | | falling tone |
| _^ | ̯ | | non-syllabic |
| _} | ̚ | | no audible release |
| ` | ˞ | | rhotacization in vowels, retroflexion in consonants (IPA uses separate symbols for consonants, see t` for an example) |
| ~ (or _~) | ̃ | | nasalization |
| _A | ̘ | | advanced tongue root |
| _a | ̺ | | apical |
| _B | ̏ | | extra low tone |
| _B_L | ᷅ | | low rising tone |
| _c | ̜ | | less rounded |
| _d | ̪ | | dental |
| _e | ̴ | | velarized or pharyngealized; also see 5 |
| _f | ↘ | | global fall |
| _G | ˠ | | velarized |
| _H | ́ | | high tone |
| _H_T | ᷄ | | high rising tone |
| _h | ʰ | | aspirated |
| _j (or ') | ʲ | | palatalized |
| _k | ̰ | | creaky voice |
| _L | ̀ | | low tone |
| _l | ˡ | | lateral release |
| _M | ̄ | | mid tone |
| _m | ̻ | | laminal |
| _N | ̼ | | linguolabial |
| _n | ⁿ | | nasal release |
| _O | ̹ | | more rounded |
| _o | ̞ | | lowered |
| _q | ̙ | | retracted tongue root |
| _r | ↗ | | global rise |
| _R_F | ᷈ | | rising falling tone |
| _r | ̝ | | raised |
| _T | ̋ | | extra high tone |
| _t | ̤ | | breathy voice |
| _v | ̬ | | voiced |
| _w | ʷ | | labialized |
| _X | ̆ | | extra-short |
| _x | ̽ | | mid-centralized |

== SAMPROSA ==
The SAM PROSodic Alphabet (SAMPROSA) is a system for prosodic transcription, developed by Dafydd Gibbon, Daniel J. Hirst, and William J. Barry as part of the SAM Prosody Working Group. SAMPROSA is composed of the prosodic symbols of SAMPA along with a SAM System for Intonation Transcription (SAMSINT). There is some overlap between the segmental symbols of SAMPA and the prosodic symbols of SAMPROSA, however, and so X-SAMPA separates out SAMPROSA notation from SAMPA by the use of the < and > tier escape symbols. The IPA's alternative way of encoding tones (ȅ, e̋, etc) also derives from the same SAMPROSA notational system: using B,L,M,H,T; R,F following a _.

=== Prosodic symbols and diacritics ===
| X-SAMPA | IPA | IPA image | Description |
|---|---|---|---|
| <^> (or ^) | ꜛ | | upstep |
| <!> (or !) | ꜜ | | downstep |
| </> (or <R>) | ↗ | | global rise |
| <\> (or <F>) | ↘ | | global fall |
| <T> | ˥ | | extra high tone |
| <H> | ˦ | | high tone |
| <M> | ˧ | | mid tone |
| <L> | ˨ | | low tone |
| <B> | ˩ | | extra low tone |
| <BT> (or <LH>, etc) | ˩˥ | | rising tone |
| <TB> (or <HL>, etc) | ˥˩ | | falling tone |
| <HT> | ˧˥ | | high rising tone |
| <BL> | ˩˧ | | low rising tone |
| <HTH> (or <MHM>, etc) | ˧˥˧ | | rising falling tone |

Such tone letters as above are represented in Unicode through combining modifier characters rendered as ligatures. For example, ˧˥ (<HT>) is represented by ˧ (<H>) and ˥ (<T>) directly adjacent, with no separating space. Occasionally, language-specific tone numbers (<1>, <2>, etc) are used instead of their explicit counterparts (eg. <TT>, <M>), but such usage across languages is not standardized as a part of X-SAMPA.

== Charts ==
=== Consonants ===
Consonants (pulmonic)
| Place of articulation → | Labial | | Coronal | | | | Dorsal | | | | Laryngeal | | | | |
| Manner of articulation ↓ | Bilabial | Labio‐ dental | Dental | Alveolar | Post‐ alveolar | Retro‐ flex | Palatal | Velar | Uvular | | Pharyn‐ geal | | Epi‐ glottal | | Glottal |
|---|---|---|---|---|---|---|---|---|---|---|---|---|---|---|---|
| Nasal | m | F | n | | | n` | J | N | N\ | | | | | | |
| Plosive | p b | p_d b_d | t d | | | t` d` | c J\ | k g | q G\ | | | | >\ | | ? |
| Fricative | p\ B | f v | T D | s z | S Z | s` z` | C j\ | x G | X | R | X\ | ?\ | H\ | <\ | h h\ |
| Approximant | B_o | v\ | r\ | | | r\` | j | M\ | | R | | ?\ | | <\ | h h\ |
| Trill | B\ | | r | | | * | | | R\ | | | | * | | |
| Tap or Flap | *^{†} | *^{†} | 4 | | | r` | | | | | | | * | | |
| Lateral Fricative | | | K K\ | | | * | * | * | | | | | | | |
| Lateral Approximant | | | l | | | l` | L | L\ | | | | | | | |
| Lateral Flap | | | l\ | | | * | * | * | | | | | | | |

- Asterisks (*) mark sounds that do not have X-SAMPA symbols. Daggers (†) mark IPA symbols that have recently been added to Unicode. Since April 2008, the latter is the case of the labiodental flap, symbolized by a right-hook v in the IPA:. A convention for the labiodental flap does not yet exist in X-SAMPA.

Coarticulated
| W | Voiceless labialized velar approximant |
| w | Voiced labialized velar approximant |
| H | Voiced labialized palatal approximant |
| s\ | Voiceless palatalized postalveolar (alveolo-palatal) fricative |
| z\ | Voiced palatalized postalveolar (alveolo-palatal) fricative |
| x\ | Voiceless "palatal-velar" fricative |

Affricates and double articulation
| ts | voiceless alveolar affricate |
| dz | voiced alveolar affricate |
| tS | voiceless postalveolar affricate |
| dZ | voiced postalveolar affricate |
| ts\ | voiceless alveolo-palatal affricate |
| dz\ | voiced alveolo-palatal affricate |
| tK | voiceless alveolar lateral affricate |
| dK\ | voiced alveolar lateral affricate |
| kp | voiceless labial-velar plosive |
| gb | voiced labial-velar plosive |
| Nm | labial-velar nasal stop |

Consonants (non-pulmonic)
| Clicks | | Implosives | | Ejectives | |
|---|---|---|---|---|---|
| O\ | Bilabial | b_< | Bilabial | _> | For example: |
| |\ | Laminal alveolar ("dental") | d_< | Alveolar | p_> | Bilabial |
| !\ | Apical (post-) alveolar ("retroflex") | J\_< | Palatal | t_> | Alveolar |
| =\ | Laminal postalveolar ("palatal") | g_< | Velar | k_> | Velar |
| |\|\ | Lateral coronal ("lateral") | G\_< | Uvular | s_> | Alveolar fricative |

=== Vowels ===
| | Front | Central | Back |
| Close |
Near‑close
Close‑mid
Mid
Open‑mid
Near‑open
Open

== See also ==
- Comparison of ASCII encodings of the International Phonetic Alphabet
- SAMPA chart for English
- List of phonetics topics
- BABEL Speech Corpus

| Place → | Labial | | | | | Coronal | | | | | | | | | | Dorsal | | | | | Laryngeal | | | |
| Manner ↓ | Bilabial | | Labiodental | | Linguolabial | | Dental | | Alveolar | | Postalveolar | | Retroflex | | (Alveolo-)palatal | | Velar | | Uvular | | Pharyngeal/epiglottal | | Glottal | |
|---|---|---|---|---|---|---|---|---|---|---|---|---|---|---|---|---|---|---|---|---|---|---|---|---|
| Nasal | m̥ | m | ɱ̊ | ɱ | | n̼ | n̪̊ | n̪ | n̥ | n | n̠̊ | n̠ | ɳ̊ | ɳ | ɲ̊ | ɲ | ŋ̊ | ŋ | ɴ̥ | ɴ | | | | |
| Plosive | p | b | p̪ | b̪ | t̼ | d̼ | t̪ | d̪ | t | d | | | ʈ | ɖ | c | ɟ | k | ɡ | q | ɢ | ʡ | | ʔ | |
| Sibilant affricate | | | | | | | t̪s̪ | d̪z̪ | ts | dz | t̠ʃ | d̠ʒ | tʂ | dʐ | tɕ | dʑ | | | | | | | | |
| Non-sibilant affricate | pɸ | bβ | p̪f | b̪v | | | t̪θ | d̪ð | tɹ̝̊ | dɹ̝ | t̠ɹ̠̊˔ | d̠ɹ̠˔ | | | cç | ɟʝ | kx | ɡɣ | qχ | ɢʁ | ʡʜ | ʡʢ | ʔh | |
| Sibilant fricative | | | | | | | s̪ | z̪ | s | z | ʃ | ʒ | ʂ | ʐ | ɕ | ʑ | | | | | | | | |
| Non-sibilant fricative | ɸ | β | f | v | θ̼ | ð̼ | θ | ð | θ̠ | ð̠ | ɹ̠̊˔ | ɹ̠˔ | ɻ̊˔ | ɻ˔ | ç | ʝ | x | ɣ | χ | ʁ | ħ | ʕ | h | ɦ |
| Approximant | | β̞ | | ʋ | | | | ð̞ | | ɹ | | ɹ̠ | | ɻ | | j | | ɰ | | | | | | ˷ |
| Tap/flap | | ⱱ̟ | | ⱱ | | | | | ɾ̥ | ɾ | | | ɽ̊ | ɽ | | | | | | ɢ̆ | | ʡ̮ | | |
| Trill | ʙ̥ | ʙ | | | | | | | r̥ | r | | r̠ | ɽ̊r̥ | ɽr | | | | | ʀ̥ | ʀ | ʜ | ʢ | | |
| Lateral affricate | | | | | | | | | tɬ | dɮ | | | tꞎ | d𝼅 | c𝼆 | ɟʎ̝ | k𝼄 | ɡʟ̝ | | | | | | |
| Lateral fricative | | | | | | | ɬ̪ | | ɬ | ɮ | | | ꞎ | 𝼅 | 𝼆 | ʎ̝ | 𝼄 | ʟ̝ | | | | | | |
| Lateral approximant | | | | | | | | l̪ | l̥ | l | | l̠ | ɭ̊ | ɭ | ʎ̥ | ʎ | ʟ̥ | ʟ | | ʟ̠ | | | | |
| Lateral tap/flap | | | | | | | | | ɺ̥ | ɺ | | | 𝼈̊ | 𝼈 | | ʎ̮ | | ʟ̆ | | | | | | |

| | | BL | LD | D | A | PA | RF | P | V | U |
|---|---|---|---|---|---|---|---|---|---|---|
| Implosive | Voiced | ɓ | | | ɗ | | ᶑ | ʄ | ɠ | ʛ |
| Implosive | Voiceless | ɓ̥ | | | ɗ̥ | | ᶑ̊ | ʄ̊ | ɠ̊ | ʛ̥ |
| Ejective | Stop | pʼ | | | tʼ | | ʈʼ | cʼ | kʼ | qʼ |
| Ejective | Affricate | | p̪fʼ | t̪θʼ | tsʼ | t̠ʃʼ | tʂʼ | tɕʼ | kxʼ | qχʼ |
| Ejective | Fricative | ɸʼ | fʼ | θʼ | sʼ | ʃʼ | ʂʼ | ɕʼ | xʼ | χʼ |
| Ejective | Lateral affricate | | | | tɬʼ | | | c𝼆ʼ | k𝼄ʼ | q𝼄ʼ |
| Ejective | Lateral fricative | | | | ɬʼ | | | | | |
| Click (top: velar; bottom: uvular) | Tenuis | kʘ qʘ | | kǀ qǀ | kǃ qǃ | | k𝼊 q𝼊 | kǂ qǂ | | |
| Click (top: velar; bottom: uvular) | Voiced | ɡʘ ɢʘ | | ɡǀ ɢǀ | ɡǃ ɢǃ | | ɡ𝼊 ɢ𝼊 | ɡǂ ɢǂ | | |
| Click (top: velar; bottom: uvular) | Nasal | ŋʘ ɴʘ | | ŋǀ ɴǀ | ŋǃ ɴǃ | | ŋ𝼊 ɴ𝼊 | ŋǂ ɴǂ | ʞ | |
| Click (top: velar; bottom: uvular) | Tenuis lateral | | | | kǁ qǁ | | | | | |
| Click (top: velar; bottom: uvular) | Voiced lateral | | | | ɡǁ ɢǁ | | | | | |
| Click (top: velar; bottom: uvular) | Nasal lateral | | | | ŋǁ ɴǁ | | | | | |
