= Labiodental consonant =

Consonants articulated with the lower lip and the upper teeth

In phonetics, labiodentals are consonants articulated with the upper teeth and the lower lip, such as [f] and [v].

== Labiodental consonants in the IPA ==
The labiodental consonants identified by the International Phonetic Alphabet are:

IPA	Description	Example			
IPA	Description	Language	Orthography	IPA	Meaning
ɱ̊	voiceless labiodental nasal	Angami			allophone of /m̥/ before /ə/
ɱ	voiced labiodental nasal	Kukuya (disputed)	[ɱíì]		'eyes'
p̪	voiceless labiodental plosive	Greek	σάπφειρος	[ˈsap̪firo̞s̠]	'sapphire'
b̪	voiced labiodental plosive	Sika			
p̪͡f	voiceless labiodental affricate	Tsonga	timpfuvu	[tiɱp̪͡fuβu]	'hippos'
b̪͡v	voiced labiodental affricate	Tsonga	shilebvu	[ʃileb̪͡vu]	'chin'
f	voiceless labiodental fricative	English	fan	[fæn]	
v	voiced labiodental fricative	English	van	[væn]	
ʋ	voiced labiodental approximant	Dutch	wang	[ʋɑŋ]	'cheek'
ⱱ	voiced labiodental flap	Mono	vwa	[ⱱa]	'send'
p̪͡fʼ	labiodental ejective affricate	Tsetsaut	apfʼo	[ap̪͡fʼo]	'boil'
fʼ	labiodental ejective fricative	Yapese	fʼaang	[fʼaːŋ]	'type of eel'
ʘ̪	labiodental click release (many different consonants)	Nǁng	ʘoe	[k͜ʘ̪oe]	'meat'

Consonants without a dedicated symbol in the IPA may be written as the corresponding bilabial consonant with the bridge diacritic for dentalization.

In English, labiodentalized /s/, /z/ and /r/ are characteristic of some individuals; these may be written [sᶹ], [zᶹ], [ɹᶹ].

The IPA chart shades out labiodental lateral consonants. This is despite the fact that the airflow in the fricatives [f] and [v] is often at the side of the mouth. No language makes a distinction in the lateral or central location of the airflow, and perhaps because of this a lateral consonant is defined as one in which the airflow passes over the side of the tongue, and so does not apply to labial consonants.

The IPA symbol ɧ was devised for a consonant of Swedish that has various pronunciations, in one dialect a rounded velarized labiodental less ambiguously transcribed as [fˠʷ]. The labiodental click is an allophonic variant of the (bi)labial click.

== Occurrence ==
The only common labiodental sounds to occur phonemically are the fricatives and the approximant. The labiodental flap occurs phonemically in over a dozen languages, but it is restricted geographically to central and southeastern Africa. With most other manners of articulation, the norm are bilabial consonants (which together with labiodentals, form the class of labial consonants).

[ɱ] is quite common, but in nearly all languages in which it occurs, it occurs only as an allophone of /m/ before labiodental consonants such as /v/ and /f/. It has been reported to occur phonemically in Kukuya, but similar claims in the past have proven spurious.

The XiNkuna dialect of Tsonga features a pair of affricates as phonemes. In some other languages, such as Xhosa, affricates may occur as allophones of the fricatives. These differ from the German voiceless labiodental affricate ⟨pf⟩, which commences with a bilabial p. All these affricates are rare sounds.

The stops are not confirmed to exist as separate phonemes in any language. They are sometimes written as ȹ ȸ (qp and db ligatures). They may also be found in children's speech or as speech impediments.

== Origins ==
The frequency of labiodentals (especially f and v) has been argued to be linked to the Agricultural Revolution.

== See also ==
- Place of articulation
- List of phonetics topics

== Sources ==
- Ladefoged, Peter; Maddieson, Ian (1996). The Sounds of the World's Languages. Oxford: Blackwell. ISBN 0-631-19815-6.
- Olson, Kenneth S.; Hajek, John (2003). "Crosslinguistic insights on the labial flap". Linguistic Typology. 7 (2): 157–186. doi:10.1515/lity.2003.014.
- Paulian, Christiane (1975). Le kukuya, langue teke du Congo: phonologie, classes nominales. Paris: SELAF. ISBN 978-2-85297-008-3.

Place →	Labial					Coronal										Dorsal					Laryngeal			
Manner ↓	Bilabial		Labiodental		Linguolabial		Dental		Alveolar		Postalveolar		Retroflex		(Alveolo-)palatal		Velar		Uvular		Pharyngeal/epiglottal		Glottal	
Nasal	m̥	m	ɱ̊	ɱ		n̼	n̪̊	n̪	n̥	n	n̠̊	n̠	ɳ̊	ɳ	ɲ̊	ɲ	ŋ̊	ŋ	ɴ̥	ɴ				
Plosive	p	b	p̪	b̪	t̼	d̼	t̪	d̪	t	d			ʈ	ɖ	c	ɟ	k	ɡ	q	ɢ	ʡ		ʔ	
Sibilant affricate							t̪s̪	d̪z̪	ts	dz	t̠ʃ	d̠ʒ	tʂ	dʐ	tɕ	dʑ								
Non-sibilant affricate	pɸ	bβ	p̪f	b̪v			t̪θ	d̪ð	tɹ̝̊	dɹ̝	t̠ɹ̠̊˔	d̠ɹ̠˔			cç	ɟʝ	kx	ɡɣ	qχ	ɢʁ	ʡʜ	ʡʢ	ʔh	
Sibilant fricative							s̪	z̪	s	z	ʃ	ʒ	ʂ	ʐ	ɕ	ʑ								
Non-sibilant fricative	ɸ	β	f	v	θ̼	ð̼	θ	ð	θ̠	ð̠	ɹ̠̊˔	ɹ̠˔	ɻ̊˔	ɻ˔	ç	ʝ	x	ɣ	χ	ʁ	ħ	ʕ	h	ɦ
Approximant		β̞		ʋ				ð̞		ɹ		ɹ̠		ɻ		j		ɰ						˷
Tap/flap		ⱱ̟		ⱱ					ɾ̥	ɾ			ɽ̊	ɽ						ɢ̆		ʡ̆		
Trill	ʙ̥	ʙ							r̥	r		r̠	ɽ̊r̥	ɽr					ʀ̥	ʀ	ʜ	ʢ		
Lateral affricate									tɬ	dɮ			tꞎ	d𝼅	c𝼆	ɟʎ̝	k𝼄	ɡʟ̝						
Lateral fricative							ɬ̪		ɬ	ɮ			ꞎ	𝼅	𝼆	ʎ̝	𝼄	ʟ̝						
Lateral approximant								l̪	l̥	l		l̠	ɭ̊	ɭ	ʎ̥	ʎ	ʟ̥	ʟ		ʟ̠				
Lateral tap/flap									ɺ̥	ɺ			𝼈̊	𝼈		ʎ̆		ʟ̆						

		BL	LD	D	A	PA	RF	P	V	U
Implosive	Voiced	ɓ			ɗ		ᶑ	ʄ	ɠ	ʛ
Implosive	Voiceless	ɓ̥			ɗ̥		ᶑ̊	ʄ̊	ɠ̊	ʛ̥
Ejective	Stop	pʼ			tʼ		ʈʼ	cʼ	kʼ	qʼ
Ejective	Affricate		p̪fʼ	tθʼ	tsʼ	tʃʼ	tʂʼ	tɕʼ	kxʼ	qχʼ
Ejective	Fricative	ɸʼ	fʼ	θʼ	sʼ	ʃʼ	ʂʼ	ɕʼ	xʼ	χʼ
Ejective	Lateral affricate				tɬʼ			c𝼆ʼ	k𝼄ʼ	q𝼄ʼ
Ejective	Lateral fricative				ɬʼ					
Click (top: velar; bottom: uvular)	Tenuis	kʘ qʘ		kǀ qǀ	kǃ qǃ		k𝼊 q𝼊	kǂ qǂ		
Click (top: velar; bottom: uvular)	Voiced	ɡʘ ɢʘ		ɡǀ ɢǀ	ɡǃ ɢǃ		ɡ𝼊 ɢ𝼊	ɡǂ ɢǂ		
Click (top: velar; bottom: uvular)	Nasal	ŋʘ ɴʘ		ŋǀ ɴǀ	ŋǃ ɴǃ		ŋ𝼊 ɴ𝼊	ŋǂ ɴǂ	ʞ	
Click (top: velar; bottom: uvular)	Tenuis lateral				kǁ qǁ					
Click (top: velar; bottom: uvular)	Voiced lateral				ɡǁ ɢǁ					
Click (top: velar; bottom: uvular)	Nasal lateral				ŋǁ ɴǁ					
