= Dafydd Gibbon =

British professor (born 1944)

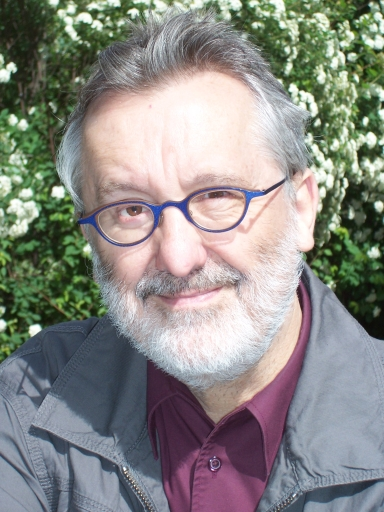
- Born: 5 April 1944 (age 82); Halifax, West Riding of Yorkshire, England

Academic background
- Education: King's College London; University of Göttingen

Academic work
- Discipline: Linguist
- Sub-discipline: Computational linguistics, phonetics
- Institutions: University of Göttingen; Bielefeld University
- Website: wwwhomes.uni-bielefeld.de/gibbon/

Dafydd Gibbon (born 5 April 1944) is a British emeritus professor of English and General Linguistics at Bielefeld University in Germany, specialising in computational linguistics, the lexicography of spoken languages, applied phonetics and phonology. He is particularly concerned with endangered languages and has received awards from the Ivory Coast, Nigeria and Poland.

Gibbon is the author of over 180 publications, editor of three handbooks and three further collections, and supervisor of 21 PhD theses. He has been Visiting Professor at Jinan University (JNU), Guangzhou, China, since 2016.

== Early life and education ==
Dafydd Gibbon was born in Halifax, West Yorkshire, UK. He is the son of a Welsh Baptist clergyman, John Thomas Gibbon (1915–1973) and Mary Gibbon (née Hudson, a physical education teacher, 1918–2012), with whom he and his four siblings lived in different towns in England and Wales during their father's pastoral ministry. He attended elementary school and grammar school in Huddersfield and grammar schools in Llanelli, South Wales, and in Great Yarmouth, Norfolk. His grandparents were tenant farmers in Pembrokeshire, South Wales, and they and his father were native speakers of Welsh. As a child he experienced inter-generational language loss, being spoken to only in English, but retaining basic knowledge of Welsh thanks to Welsh lessons in school.

Gibbon studied German, French and theology at King's College, University of London. He earned his B.A. Honours from the University of London and his Associate of King's College in 1966. He received his doctor of philosophy degree at the University of Göttingen in 1976, with a dissertation on Perspectives of intonation analysis (1976). Its discussion of "calling" or "vocative invocation" was considered "the most complete discussion of the subject to date".

== Academic career ==
Gibbon started his academic career in the year 1968 as an English lecturer at the Seminar für Englische Philologie, University of Göttingen, Germany. Four years later he became an assistant professor at that university and held this position until 1980. In 1980–1981 he worked as professor for Theory and Practice of translation at University of Applied Sciences in Cologne. In 1981 he became professor of English and General Linguistics at the Faculty of Linguistics and Literary Studies at Bielefeld University in Germany, working there until his retirement in 2009.

Gibbon participated in the European Speech Assessment Methods (SAM) project and was involved in development of the SAMPA Alphabet in this project, and in the European EAGLES projects. As part of these projects he was lead editor of two handbooks on standards and evaluation of speech technology systems (1997, 2000).

In the international Verbmobil project for speech-to-speech translation, he was the lexicographic coordinator for the development of an inheritance lexicon, supporting speaker independent automatic translation from German to English and Japanese.

He became Convenor of the international COCOSDA group (International Coordinating Committee for Speech Databases and Assessment) from 2006 until 2014.

He has published mainly in the areas of computational phonology, prosody, and lexicography. He has researched English, German, Welsh, Polish, Brazilian Portuguese, Yacouba, and Baule (Ivory Coast), Tem (Togo), Igbo, and Ibibio (Nigeria), Kuki-Thadou (India) and Mandarin (China), and is particularly concerned about endangered languages.

On 10 March 2010, Gibbon was selected as Linguist of the Day on the Linguist List and then again on 27 March 2018 as Featured Linguist.

His Erdős number is 4, with the lineage Erdős – Tarski – Maddux – Ladkin – Gibbon, and his current h-index is 27.

=== Awards ===
Gibbon has received various awards including the following:

- 1968: University of London Laurel for ecumenical work on the Religious Affairs Sub-Committee as President of the John Clifford Society (London Baptist Students Society)
- 1992: Best Paper Award, KONVENS 1992, Nürnberg: "Prosody, time types and linguistic design factors in spoken language system architectures." (1992)
- 1994: Best Paper Award, DAGM Symposium, Wien: "Detektion unbekannter Wörter mit Hilfe phonotaktischer Modelle", co-awarded with A. Jusek, H. Rautenstrauch, G.A.Fink, F. Kummert, G. Sagerer, J.Carson-Berndsen (1994)
- 2001: Honorary membership in the Polish Phonetic Association (Polskie Towarzystwo Fonetyczne)
- 2006: Silver Jubilee Distinguished Award of the Linguistic Association of Nigeria
- 2009: Distinguished Service Medal of Adam Mickiewicz University in Poznań, Poland
- 2009: Urua, Eno-Abasi; Ekpenyong, Moses; Ahoua, Firmin (2009). Language Development beyond Borders. A Festschrift in Honour of Professor Dr. Dafydd Gibbon. University of Uyo, Nigeria and Université Houphouet Boigny, Abidjan, Côte d'Ivoire. ISBN 978-978-055-556-6.
- 2014: "Officier de l'Ordre du Mérite Ivoirien" in Abidjan, Côte d'Ivoire, for his life's work in supporting linguistics and language technologies in West Africa

=== Selected publications ===
==== Books ====
- Gibbon, Dafydd (1976). Perspectives of intonation analysis. Bern: Herbert Lang. ISBN 9783261017345.
- Gibbon, Dafydd; Richter, Helmut, eds. (1984). Intonation, accent, and rhythm studies in discourse phonology. Berlin: W. de Gruyter. ISBN 978-3110863239.
- Gibbon, Dafydd; Moore, Roger; Winski, Richard, eds. (1997). Spoken language reference materials (2 editions: single volume and four volumes ed.). Berlin: Mouton de Gruyter. ISBN 9783110157369.
- Gibbon, Dafydd; Mertins, Inga; Moore, Roger K., eds. (2000). Handbook of multimodal and spoken dialogue systems : resources, terminology and product evaluation. Boston, Mass.: Kluwer Academic Publ. ISBN 9780792379041.
- Mehler, Alexander; Romary, Laurent; Gibbon, Dafydd, eds. (2012). Handbook of Technical Communication. Berlin: Walter de Gruyter. doi:10.1515/9783110224948. ISBN 9783110224948. S2CID 60295302.

==== Book chapters and articles ====
- Gibbon, Dafydd (1988). "Intonation and discourse." In Janos Petöfi, ed. (1988), Text and Discourse Constitution. Berlin: de Gruyter. 3-25.
- Gibbon, Dafydd (1995). "Empirical and semiotic foundations of prosodic analysis." In: Uta Quasthoff, ed. (1995), Aspects of Oral Communication, Research in Texttheory. Berlin: de Gruyter.
- Gibbon, Dafydd (1992). "ILEX: A Linguistic Approach to Computational Lexica." Computatio Linguae, Zeitschrift für Dialektologie und Linguistik, 73:32-53.
- Gibbon, Dafydd and Inge Mertins (2000). "Terminology for spoken language systems." In: Gibbon, Dafydd, Inge Mertins and Roger Moore, eds. (2000). Handbook of Multimodal and Spoken Dialogue Systems: Resources, Terminology and Product Evaluation. Dordrecht: Kluwer Academic Publishers, 240-280.
- Gibbon, Dafydd (2001). "Finite state prosodic analysis of African corpus resources," Proceedings of Eurospeech 2001, Aalborg, Denmark, I: 83-86.
- Gibbon, Dafydd (2006). "Time Types and Time Trees: Prosodic Mining and Alignment of Temporally Annotated Data." In: Sudhoff, Stefan, Denisa Lenertova, Roland Meyer, Sandra Pappert, Petra Augurzky, Ina Mleinek, Nicole Richter and Johannes Schließer, eds. (2006). Methods in Empirical Prosody Research. Berlin: Walter de Gruyter, 181-210.
- Gibbon, Dafydd and Sascha Griffiths (2017). "Multilinear Grammar: Ranks and Interpretations." In: Open Linguistics 3 (1): 265–307.
