= Voiced labiodental flap =

Consonantal sound represented by ⟨ⱱ⟩ in IPA

ⱱ

v̆
- IPA number: 184

Audio sample
- source · help

Encoding
- Entity (decimal): &#11377;
- Unicode (hex): U+2C71
- X-SAMPA: v_X
- Braille: ⠖ (braille pattern dots-235) ⠧ (braille pattern dots-1236)
Image

In phonetics, a voiced labiodental flap is a speech sound found primarily in languages of Central Africa, such as Kera and Mangbetu. It has also been reported in the Austronesian language Sika. It is one of the few non-rhotic flaps. The sound begins with the lower lip placed behind the upper teeth. The lower lip is then flipped outward, striking the upper teeth in passing.

== Transcription ==
The symbol in the International Phonetic Alphabet that represents this sound is ⟨ⱱ⟩, which resembles Cyrillic izhitsa, ⟨ѵ⟩, but is composed of a V and the hook of the flap ⟨ɾ⟩. In 2005, the International Phonetic Association, responding to Kenneth Olson's request for its adoption, voted to include a symbol for this sound, and selected a v with a right hook, that is, a combination of ⟨v⟩ + ⟨ɾ⟩. As of version 5.1.0, the Unicode character set encodes this character at U+2C71 (ⱱ). In earlier literature, it is often transcribed by a v modified by the extra-short diacritic, ⟨v̆⟩, following a 1989 recommendation of the International Phonetic Association. Another historic symbol for this sound was v with curl ⟨ⱴ⟩, which had been employed in articles from the School of Oriental and African Studies, by Joseph Greenberg, and others.

== Features ==
Features of a voiced labiodental flap:

- Its manner of articulation is flap, which normally means it is produced with a single contraction of the muscles so that the tongue makes very brief contact. In this case, being a non-rhotic consonant, the flap is made with the lower lip.
- Its place of articulation is labiodental, which means it is articulated with the lower lip and the upper teeth.
- Its phonation is voiced, which means the vocal cords vibrate during the articulation.
- It is an oral consonant, which means that air is not allowed to escape through the nose.
- Because the sound is not produced with airflow over the tongue, the median–lateral dichotomy does not apply.
- Its airstream mechanism is pulmonic, which means it is articulated by pushing air only with the intercostal muscles and abdominal muscles, as in most speech sounds.

== Occurrence ==
A labiodental flap is found primarily in Central Africa, in as many as a few hundred languages found in the Chadic family (Margi, Tera), Ubangian (Ngbaka, Ma'bo, Sera), Mbum (e.g. Kare), Central Sudanic (Mangbetu, Kresh), and Bantoid (Ngwe, some Shona dialects). It is extremely rare outside Africa, though it has been reported from Sika in Flores.

Language	Word	IPA	Meaning	Notes
Bana	[ɡeⱱin]		'fishhook'	Mainly restricted to ideophones, and between high central vowels. Contrasts with /v/.
Kera	[ⱱehti]		'push your head out of a hole or out of water'	Since most of the lexical items are ideophones, it is not definitively the case that the labial flap has been fully incorporated into the phonological system of Kera.
Mangbetu	[taⱱa]		'ten'	Contrasts with /ʙ, v, w/.
Marghi Central	[ⱱǎ]		'to bypass'	
Mono	vwa	[ⱱa]	'send'	Contrasts with /v, w/. In free variation with bilabial flap
Ngbaka	vù	[ⱱù]	'to clear a field'	Generally not considered a core underlying phoneme.
Shona	[ⱱuka]		'to predict'	
Sika	[ⱱoti]		'I stand a pole in the ground'	Contrasts with /v/ and /β/. May also be realized as [b̪]

The bilabial flap is a variant of the labiodental flap in several languages, including Mono. This sound involves striking the upper lip rather than the upper teeth. The two sounds are not known to contrast in any language; the term labial flap can be used as a broader description encompassing both sounds.

In Sika, the flap is heard in careful pronunciation, but it may also be realized as a voiced labiodental stop, [b̪], or an affricate. It contrasts with both a bilabial and a labiodental fricative:

[ⱱoti]	'I stand a pole in the ground'
[βati]	'I buy'
[vehte]	'we (inclusive) buy'

== Bibliography ==
- Hofmann, Erica (1990), A Preliminary Phonology of Bana (PDF) (MA thesis), University of Victoria, OCLC 27946722, archived from the original (PDF) on 2017-01-13
- International Phonetic Association (1989), "Report on the 1989 Kiel Convention", Journal of the International Phonetic Association, 19 (2): 67–80, doi:10.1017/S0025100300003868, S2CID 249412330
- International Phonetic Association (2005), "IPA news", Journal of the International Phonetic Association, 35 (2): 261–262, doi:10.1017/S0025100305002227, S2CID 232350099
- Olson, Kenneth S.; Hajek, John (1999), "The phonetic status of the labial flap", Journal of the International Phonetic Association, 29 (2): 101–114, doi:10.1017/S0025100300006484, JSTOR 44526239, S2CID 14438770
- Olson, Kenneth S.; Hajek, John (2003), "Crosslinguistic insights on the labial flap", Linguistic Typology, 7 (2): 157–186, doi:10.1515/lity.2003.014
- Olson, Kenneth S.; Hajek, John (2004), "A crosslinguistic lexicon of the labial flap", Linguistic Discovery, 2 (2): 21–57, doi:10.1349/ps1.1537-0852.a.262
- Olson, Kenneth S. (2004), "Mono" (PDF), Journal of the International Phonetic Association, 34 (2): 233–238, doi:10.1017/S0025100304001744

Place →	Labial					Coronal										Dorsal					Laryngeal			
Manner ↓	Bilabial		Labiodental		Linguolabial		Dental		Alveolar		Postalveolar		Retroflex		(Alveolo-)palatal		Velar		Uvular		Pharyngeal/epiglottal		Glottal	
Nasal	m̥	m	ɱ̊	ɱ		n̼	n̪̊	n̪	n̥	n	n̠̊	n̠	ɳ̊	ɳ	ɲ̊	ɲ	ŋ̊	ŋ	ɴ̥	ɴ				
Plosive	p	b	p̪	b̪	t̼	d̼	t̪	d̪	t	d			ʈ	ɖ	c	ɟ	k	ɡ	q	ɢ	ʡ		ʔ	
Sibilant affricate							t̪s̪	d̪z̪	ts	dz	t̠ʃ	d̠ʒ	tʂ	dʐ	tɕ	dʑ								
Non-sibilant affricate	pɸ	bβ	p̪f	b̪v			t̪θ	d̪ð	tɹ̝̊	dɹ̝	t̠ɹ̠̊˔	d̠ɹ̠˔			cç	ɟʝ	kx	ɡɣ	qχ	ɢʁ	ʡʜ	ʡʢ	ʔh	
Sibilant fricative							s̪	z̪	s	z	ʃ	ʒ	ʂ	ʐ	ɕ	ʑ								
Non-sibilant fricative	ɸ	β	f	v	θ̼	ð̼	θ	ð	θ̠	ð̠	ɹ̠̊˔	ɹ̠˔	ɻ̊˔	ɻ˔	ç	ʝ	x	ɣ	χ	ʁ	ħ	ʕ	h	ɦ
Approximant		β̞		ʋ				ð̞		ɹ		ɹ̠		ɻ		j		ɰ						˷
Tap/flap		ⱱ̟		ⱱ					ɾ̥	ɾ			ɽ̊	ɽ						ɢ̆		ʡ̆		
Trill	ʙ̥	ʙ							r̥	r		r̠	ɽ̊r̥	ɽr					ʀ̥	ʀ	ʜ	ʢ		
Lateral affricate									tɬ	dɮ			tꞎ	d𝼅	c𝼆	ɟʎ̝	k𝼄	ɡʟ̝						
Lateral fricative							ɬ̪		ɬ	ɮ			ꞎ	𝼅	𝼆	ʎ̝	𝼄	ʟ̝						
Lateral approximant								l̪	l̥	l		l̠	ɭ̊	ɭ	ʎ̥	ʎ	ʟ̥	ʟ		ʟ̠				
Lateral tap/flap									ɺ̥	ɺ			𝼈̊	𝼈		ʎ̆		ʟ̆						

		BL	LD	D	A	PA	RF	P	V	U
Implosive	Voiced	ɓ			ɗ		ᶑ	ʄ	ɠ	ʛ
Implosive	Voiceless	ɓ̥			ɗ̥		ᶑ̊	ʄ̊	ɠ̊	ʛ̥
Ejective	Stop	pʼ			tʼ		ʈʼ	cʼ	kʼ	qʼ
Ejective	Affricate		p̪fʼ	tθʼ	tsʼ	tʃʼ	tʂʼ	tɕʼ	kxʼ	qχʼ
Ejective	Fricative	ɸʼ	fʼ	θʼ	sʼ	ʃʼ	ʂʼ	ɕʼ	xʼ	χʼ
Ejective	Lateral affricate				tɬʼ			c𝼆ʼ	k𝼄ʼ	q𝼄ʼ
Ejective	Lateral fricative				ɬʼ					
Click (top: velar; bottom: uvular)	Tenuis	kʘ qʘ		kǀ qǀ	kǃ qǃ		k𝼊 q𝼊	kǂ qǂ		
Click (top: velar; bottom: uvular)	Voiced	ɡʘ ɢʘ		ɡǀ ɢǀ	ɡǃ ɢǃ		ɡ𝼊 ɢ𝼊	ɡǂ ɢǂ		
Click (top: velar; bottom: uvular)	Nasal	ŋʘ ɴʘ		ŋǀ ɴǀ	ŋǃ ɴǃ		ŋ𝼊 ɴ𝼊	ŋǂ ɴǂ	ʞ	
Click (top: velar; bottom: uvular)	Tenuis lateral				kǁ qǁ					
Click (top: velar; bottom: uvular)	Voiced lateral				ɡǁ ɢǁ					
Click (top: velar; bottom: uvular)	Nasal lateral				ŋǁ ɴǁ					
