= SAMPA chart for English =

SAMPA is a computer-readable phonetic script based on the International Phonetic Alphabet (IPA). It was developed in the late 1980s in the European Commission-funded ESPRIT project 2589 Speech Assessment Methods (SAM) to facilitate email data exchange and computational processing of transcriptions in phonetics and speech technology.

SAM Phonetic Alphabets (SAMPA) have been developed for sounds in at least 27 languages.

The following is a concise SAMPA chart for English:

SAMPA: English Consonants
| SAMPA | Examples | IPA |
|---|---|---|
| p | pen, spit, lip | p |
| b | bed, rib | b |
| t | two, sting, bet | t |
| d | do, odd | d |
| 4 | better, matter (GenAm) | ɾ |
| tS | chair, nature, teach | tʃ |
| dZ | gin, joy, edge | dʒ |
| k | cat, kill, skin, queen, thick | k |
| g | go, get, beg | ɡ |
| f | fool, enough, leaf | f |
| v | voice, have, of | v |
| T | thing, breath | θ |
| D | this, breathe | ð |
| s | see, city, pass | s |
| z | zoo, rose | z |
| S | she, sure, emotion, leash | ʃ |
| Z | pleasure, beige | ʒ |
| h | ham | h |
| m | man, ham | m |
| n | no, tin | n |
| N | singer, ring | ŋ |
| l | left, bell | l |
| r\ | run, very | ɹ |
| w | we | w |
| j | yes | j |
| W | what (some accents, such as Scottish) | ʍ |
| x | loch (Scottish) | x |

SAMPA: English Vowels
| SAMPA | | | Examples | IPA | | |
| RP | GenAm | AuE | Examples | RP | GenAm | AuE |
|---|---|---|---|---|---|---|
| A: | A | 6: | father | ɑː | ɑ | ɐː |
| i: | i | i: | see | iː | i | iː |
| I | I | I | city | ɪ | ɪ | ɪ |
| E | E | e | bed | ɛ | ɛ | e |
| 3: | 3` | 3: | bird | ɜː | ɝ | ɜː |
| { | { | { | lad, cat, ran | æ | æ | æ |
| A: | Ar\ | 6: | arm | ɑː | ɑɹ | ɐː |
| V | V | 6 | run, enough | ʌ | ʌ | ɐ |
| Q | A | O | not, wasp | ɒ | ɑ | ɔ |
| O: | O or A | o: | law, caught | ɔː | ɔ or ɑ | oː |
| U | U | U | put | ʊ | ʊ | ʊ |
| u: | u | }: | soon, through | uː | u | ʉː |
| @ | @ | @ | about | ə | ə | ə |
| @ | @` | @ | winner | ə | ɚ | ə |

SAMPA: English Diphthongs
| SAMPA | | | Examples | IPA | | |
| RP | GenAm | AuE | Examples | RP | GenAm | AuE |
|---|---|---|---|---|---|---|
| eI | eI or e | {I | day | eɪ | eɪ or e | æɪ |
| aI | aI | Ae | my | aɪ | aɪ | ɑɪ |
| OI | OI | oI | boy | ɔɪ | ɔɪ | oɪ |
| @U | oU or o | @} | no | əʊ | oʊ or o | əʉ |
| aU | aU | {O | now | aʊ | aʊ | æɔ |
| I@ | ir\ | I@ | near, here | ɪə | iɹ | ɪə |
| E@ | er\ | e: | hair, there | ɛə | eɹ | eː |
| U@ | Ur\ | U@ | tour | ʊə | ʊɹ | ʊə |
| ju: | ju | j}: | pupil | juː | ju | jʉː |

SAMPA: Other symbols used in transcription of English pronunciation
| SAMPA | Explanation | IPA |
|---|---|---|
| " | Primary stress (placed before the stressed syllable), for example "happy" /"h{pi/ | ˈ |
| % | Secondary stress, for example "battleship" /"b{tl=%SIp/ | ˌ |
| . | Syllable separator | . |
| = | Syllabic consonant, for example /"rIdn=/ for ridden | ◌̩ |

== See also ==
- International Phonetic Alphabet chart for English dialects
- X-SAMPA
