= Qp ligature =

Ligature of letters Q and P

- ȹ

Usage
- Writing system: Latin script
- Type: Alphabetic
- Sound values: [p̪]
- In Unicode: U+0239

History
- Development: q, p: ȹ

Other
- Writing direction: Left-to-right

The qp ligature, ȹ, is an orthographic ligature of Latin letters q and p, and is used in some phonetic transcription systems, particularly for African languages, to represent a voiceless labiodental plosive [p̪], for example in the Zulu sequence [ɱȹfʼ].

== In Unicode ==
Character information
Preview	ȹ	
Unicode name	LATIN SMALL LETTER QP DIGRAPH	
Encodings	decimal	hex
Unicode	569	U+0239
UTF-8	200 185	C8 B9
Numeric character reference	&#569;	&#x239;

== See also ==
- ȸ, ligature of Latin letters d and b
- ⴔ (pari), the 24th letter of Georgian alphabets (Nuskhuri letter looks identical)
- φ (phi), the 21st letter of Greek alphabet
- ф (ef), the 21st letter of Cyrillic alphabet
