= Db ligature =

Ligature of letters D and B

- ȸ

Usage
- Writing system: Latin script
- Type: Alphabetic
- Sound values: [b̪]
- In Unicode: U+0238

History
- Development: d, b: ȸ

Other
- Writing direction: Left-to-right

The db ligature, ȸ, is a typographic ligature of Latin d and b, and is used in Africanist linguistics for the transcription of certain African languages to represent [b̪], for example in the Zulu sequence [ɱȸv]. ȸ was added to Unicode 4.1 in 2005, as U+0238 LATIN SMALL LETTER DB DIGRAPH. As of 2010, only a handful of fonts can display the character. These include Charis SIL, Code2000, Doulos SIL, Ubuntu, and DejaVu fonts.

== Unicode character ==
Character information
Preview	ȸ	
Unicode name	LATIN SMALL LETTER DB DIGRAPH	
Encodings	decimal	hex
Unicode	568	U+0238
UTF-8	200 184	C8 B8
Numeric character reference	&#568;	&#x238;

== See also ==
- ȹ, its voiceless counterpart
