= Bilabial consonant =

Consonant articulated with both lips

In phonetics, a bilabial consonant is a labial consonant articulated with both lips.

== Frequency ==
Bilabial consonants are very common across languages. Only around 0.7% of the world's languages lack bilabial consonants altogether, including Taushiro, Tlingit, Chipewyan, Oneida, and Wichita, though all of these have a labial–velar approximant /w/.

== Varieties ==
Some bilabial consonants identified by the International Phonetic Alphabet (IPA) are:

IPA	Description	Example			
IPA	Description	Language	Orthography	IPA	Meaning
m̥	voiceless bilabial nasal	Hmong	Hmoob	[m̥ɔ̃́]	Hmong
m	voiced bilabial nasal	English	man	[mæn]	man
p	voiceless bilabial plosive	English	spin	[spɪn]	spin
b	voiced bilabial plosive	English	bed	[bɛd]	bed
p͜ɸ	voiceless bilabial affricate	Kaingang	fy	[ˈp͜ɸɤ]	'seed'
b͜β	voiced bilabial affricate	Shipibo	boko	[ˈb͜βo̽ko̽]	'small intestine'
ɸ	voiceless bilabial fricative	Japanese	富士山 (fujisan)	[ɸɯʑisaɴ]	Mount Fuji
β	voiced bilabial fricative	Ewe	ɛʋɛ	[ɛ̀βɛ̀]	Ewe
β̞	bilabial approximant	Spanish	lobo	[loβ̞o]	wolf
ⱱ̟	voiced bilabial flap	Mono	vwa	[ⱱ̟a]	'send'
ʙ̥	voiceless bilabial trill	Pará Arára	[ʙ̥uta]		'to throw away'
ʙ	voiced bilabial trill	Nias	simbi	[siʙi]	lower jaw
pʼ	bilabial ejective stop	Adyghe	пӀэ	[pʼa]	meat
ɸʼ	bilabial ejective fricative	Yuchi	ḟasę	[ɸʼasẽ]	'good evening!'
ɓ̥	voiceless bilabial implosive	Kaqchikel	b'ojoy	[ɓ̥oχoj]	'pot'
ɓ	voiced bilabial implosive	Jamaican Patois	beat	[ɓiːt]	beat
k͡ʘ q͡ʘ ɡ͡ʘ ɢ͡ʘ ŋ͡ʘ ɴ͡ʘ	bilabial clicks (many distinct consonants)	Nǁng	ʘoe	[k͡ʘoe]	meat

Owere Igbo has a six-way contrast among bilabial stops: [p pʰ ɓ̥ b b̤ ɓ].

The IPA chart shades out bilabial lateral consonants. This is because lateral consonants are defined as ones in which the airflow passes over the side of the tongue; the category therefore does not apply to labial consonants. (See also labiodental consonant, which very commonly have airflow at the side of the mouth.)

== Other varieties ==
The extensions to the IPA also define a bilabial percussive ([ʬ]) for smacking the lips together. A lip-smack in the non-percussive sense of the lips audibly parting would be an ingressive [ʬ↓].

== See also ==
- Place of articulation
- Index of phonetics articles

Place →	Labial					Coronal										Dorsal					Laryngeal			
Manner ↓	Bilabial		Labiodental		Linguolabial		Dental		Alveolar		Postalveolar		Retroflex		(Alveolo-)palatal		Velar		Uvular		Pharyngeal/epiglottal		Glottal	
Nasal	m̥	m	ɱ̊	ɱ		n̼	n̪̊	n̪	n̥	n	n̠̊	n̠	ɳ̊	ɳ	ɲ̊	ɲ	ŋ̊	ŋ	ɴ̥	ɴ				
Plosive	p	b	p̪	b̪	t̼	d̼	t̪	d̪	t	d			ʈ	ɖ	c	ɟ	k	ɡ	q	ɢ	ʡ		ʔ	
Sibilant affricate							t̪s̪	d̪z̪	ts	dz	t̠ʃ	d̠ʒ	tʂ	dʐ	tɕ	dʑ								
Non-sibilant affricate	pɸ	bβ	p̪f	b̪v			t̪θ	d̪ð	tɹ̝̊	dɹ̝	t̠ɹ̠̊˔	d̠ɹ̠˔			cç	ɟʝ	kx	ɡɣ	qχ	ɢʁ	ʡʜ	ʡʢ	ʔh	
Sibilant fricative							s̪	z̪	s	z	ʃ	ʒ	ʂ	ʐ	ɕ	ʑ								
Non-sibilant fricative	ɸ	β	f	v	θ̼	ð̼	θ	ð	θ̠	ð̠	ɹ̠̊˔	ɹ̠˔	ɻ̊˔	ɻ˔	ç	ʝ	x	ɣ	χ	ʁ	ħ	ʕ	h	ɦ
Approximant		β̞		ʋ				ð̞		ɹ		ɹ̠		ɻ		j		ɰ						˷
Tap/flap		ⱱ̟		ⱱ					ɾ̥	ɾ			ɽ̊	ɽ						ɢ̆		ʡ̮		
Trill	ʙ̥	ʙ							r̥	r		r̠	ɽ̊r̥	ɽr					ʀ̥	ʀ	ʜ	ʢ		
Lateral affricate									tɬ	dɮ			tꞎ	d𝼅	c𝼆	ɟʎ̝	k𝼄	ɡʟ̝						
Lateral fricative							ɬ̪		ɬ	ɮ			ꞎ	𝼅	𝼆	ʎ̝	𝼄	ʟ̝						
Lateral approximant								l̪	l̥	l		l̠	ɭ̊	ɭ	ʎ̥	ʎ	ʟ̥	ʟ		ʟ̠				
Lateral tap/flap									ɺ̥	ɺ			𝼈̊	𝼈		ʎ̮		ʟ̆						

		BL	LD	D	A	PA	RF	P	V	U
Implosive	Voiced	ɓ			ɗ		ᶑ	ʄ	ɠ	ʛ
Implosive	Voiceless	ɓ̥			ɗ̥		ᶑ̊	ʄ̊	ɠ̊	ʛ̥
Ejective	Stop	pʼ			tʼ		ʈʼ	cʼ	kʼ	qʼ
Ejective	Affricate		p̪fʼ	t̪θʼ	tsʼ	t̠ʃʼ	tʂʼ	tɕʼ	kxʼ	qχʼ
Ejective	Fricative	ɸʼ	fʼ	θʼ	sʼ	ʃʼ	ʂʼ	ɕʼ	xʼ	χʼ
Ejective	Lateral affricate				tɬʼ			c𝼆ʼ	k𝼄ʼ	q𝼄ʼ
Ejective	Lateral fricative				ɬʼ					
Click (top: velar; bottom: uvular)	Tenuis	kʘ qʘ		kǀ qǀ	kǃ qǃ		k𝼊 q𝼊	kǂ qǂ		
Click (top: velar; bottom: uvular)	Voiced	ɡʘ ɢʘ		ɡǀ ɢǀ	ɡǃ ɢǃ		ɡ𝼊 ɢ𝼊	ɡǂ ɢǂ		
Click (top: velar; bottom: uvular)	Nasal	ŋʘ ɴʘ		ŋǀ ɴǀ	ŋǃ ɴǃ		ŋ𝼊 ɴ𝼊	ŋǂ ɴǂ	ʞ	
Click (top: velar; bottom: uvular)	Tenuis lateral				kǁ qǁ					
Click (top: velar; bottom: uvular)	Voiced lateral				ɡǁ ɢǁ					
Click (top: velar; bottom: uvular)	Nasal lateral				ŋǁ ɴǁ					
