= Voiced bilabial flap =

Consonantal sound represented by ⟨ⱱ̟⟩ or ⟨b̆⟩ in IPA

ⱱ̟

w̆

b̆
- IPA number: 184 413

Audio sample
- source · help

Encoding
- Entity (decimal): &#11377;&#799;
- Unicode (hex): U+2C71 U+031F
- X-SAMPA: w_X or b_X
Image

A voiced bilabial flap is an uncommon non-rhotic flap. It is usually, and perhaps always, an allophone of the labiodental flap, though it is the preferred allophone in a minority of languages such as Banda and some of its neighbors.

In Mono, the sound has been described as follows:

In the first step, the lower lip retracts into the oral cavity to a position behind the upper teeth. At the same time, the upper lip descends to wrap over the upper teeth. In the second step, the lower lip moves forward quickly, flapping against the upper lip as it exits the oral cavity. It is voiced throughout the articulation. In addition, during the articulation of the sound, the tongue bunches in the back of the mouth, adding a velar component to the sound.

And, for allophony between the bilabial and labiodental flap,

The articulation of the sound consists of two stages. First, the lower lip is retracted slowly into the mouth well behind the upper teeth. Second, the lower lip is brought forward rapidly striking the upper lip or upper teeth in passing.

In the literature, this sound has most often been transcribed with ⟨w̆⟩, a ⟨w⟩ modified by an extra-short diacritic. (Note: Velar taps and flaps are considered impossible sounds according to the IPA, so an extra-short ⟨w⟩ by definition can only refer to labial articulation. The decision to use ⟨w̆⟩ instead of ⟨b̆⟩, an extra short ⟨b⟩, maintains a graphical parallel with ⟨v̆⟩, the former transcription most commonly used for the voiced labiodental flap.) A less frequently used alternative transcription is ⟨ⱱ̟⟩, a labiodental flap ⟨ⱱ⟩ modified by an advanced diacritic. In addition, the symbol ⟨ⱳ⟩, a W with hook, is supported by SIL Global as a para-IPA transcription for this sound.

== Features ==
Features of a voiced bilabial flap:

- Its manner of articulation is flap, which normally means it is produced with a single contraction of the muscles so that the tongue makes very brief contact. In this case, being a non-rhotic consonant, the flap is made with the lower lip.
- Its place of articulation is bilabial, which means it is articulated with both lips.
- Its phonation is voiced, which means the vocal cords vibrate during the articulation.
- It is an oral consonant, which means that air is not allowed to escape through the nose.
- Because the sound is not produced with airflow over the tongue, the median–lateral dichotomy does not apply.
- Its airstream mechanism is pulmonic, which means it is articulated by pushing air only with the intercostal muscles and abdominal muscles, as in most speech sounds.

== Occurrence ==
Language		Word	IPA	Meaning	Notes
Taiwanese Hakka	Sixian	𤸁苶苶仔	[kʰʲoʲ˥ ŋʲap˨ ŋʲaⱱ̟˨ ɛ˥˧]	'tired'	
Mambay		vbwah	[ⱱ̟wâˁħ]	'fog'	Phonemic.
Mangbetu		[nɔ́w̆à]		'to refrain'	In free variation with a labiodental flap [ⱱ]
Mono		vwa	[w̆a]	'send'	Contrasts with /v/ and /w/. In free variation with a labiodental flap [ⱱ]

== Notes ==
Place →	Labial					Coronal										Dorsal					Laryngeal			
Manner ↓	Bilabial		Labiodental		Linguolabial		Dental		Alveolar		Postalveolar		Retroflex		(Alveolo-)palatal		Velar		Uvular		Pharyngeal/epiglottal		Glottal	
Nasal	m̥	m	ɱ̊	ɱ		n̼	n̪̊	n̪	n̥	n	n̠̊	n̠	ɳ̊	ɳ	ɲ̊	ɲ	ŋ̊	ŋ	ɴ̥	ɴ				
Plosive	p	b	p̪	b̪	t̼	d̼	t̪	d̪	t	d			ʈ	ɖ	c	ɟ	k	ɡ	q	ɢ	ʡ		ʔ	
Sibilant affricate							ts̪	dz̪	ts	dz	tʃ	dʒ	tʂ	dʐ	tɕ	dʑ								
Non-sibilant affricate	pɸ	bβ	p̪f	b̪v			tθ	dð	tɹ̝̊	dɹ̝	t̠ɹ̝̊	d̠ɹ̝			cç	ɟʝ	kx	ɡɣ	qχ	ɢʁ	ʡʜ	ʡʢ	ʔh	
Sibilant fricative							s̪	z̪	s	z	ʃ	ʒ	ʂ	ʐ	ɕ	ʑ								
Non-sibilant fricative	ɸ	β	f	v	θ̼	ð̼	θ	ð	θ̠	ð̠	ɹ̝̠̊	ɹ̠᷵	ɻ̥᷵	ɻ᷵	ç	ʝ	x	ɣ	χ	ʁ	ħ	ʕ	h	ɦ
Approximant		β̞		ʋ				ð̞		ɹ		ɹ̠		ɻ		j		ɰ						˷
Tap/flap		ⱱ̟		ⱱ					ɾ̥	ɾ			ɽ̊	ɽ						ɢ̆		ʡ̆		
Trill	ʙ̥	ʙ							r̥	r		r̠	ɽ̊r̥	ɽr					ʀ̥	ʀ	ʜ	ʢ		
Lateral affricate									tɬ	dɮ			tꞎ	d𝼅	c𝼆	ɟʎ̝	k𝼄	ɡʟ̝						
Lateral fricative							ɬ̪		ɬ	ɮ			ꞎ	𝼅	𝼆	ʎ̝	𝼄	ʟ̝						
Lateral approximant								l̪	l̥	l		l̠	ɭ̊	ɭ	ʎ̥	ʎ	ʟ̥	ʟ		ʟ̠				
Lateral tap/flap									ɺ̥	ɺ			𝼈̊	𝼈		ʎ̆		ʟ̆						

		BL	LD	D	A	PA	RF	P	V	U
Implosive	Voiced	ɓ			ɗ		ᶑ	ʄ	ɠ	ʛ
Implosive	Voiceless	ɓ̥			ɗ̥		ᶑ̊	ʄ̊	ɠ̊	ʛ̥
Ejective	Stop	pʼ			tʼ		ʈʼ	cʼ	kʼ	qʼ
Ejective	Affricate		p̪fʼ	tθʼ	tsʼ	tʃʼ	tʂʼ	tɕʼ	kxʼ	qχʼ
Ejective	Fricative	ɸʼ	fʼ	θʼ	sʼ	ʃʼ	ʂʼ	ɕʼ	xʼ	χʼ
Ejective	Lateral affricate				tɬʼ			c𝼆ʼ	k𝼄ʼ	q𝼄ʼ
Ejective	Lateral fricative				ɬʼ					
Click (top: velar; bottom: uvular)	Tenuis	kʘ qʘ		kǀ qǀ	kǃ qǃ		k𝼊 q𝼊	kǂ qǂ		
Click (top: velar; bottom: uvular)	Voiced	ɡʘ ɢʘ		ɡǀ ɢǀ	ɡǃ ɢǃ		ɡ𝼊 ɢ𝼊	ɡǂ ɢǂ		
Click (top: velar; bottom: uvular)	Nasal	ŋʘ ɴʘ		ŋǀ ɴǀ	ŋǃ ɴǃ		ŋ𝼊 ɴ𝼊	ŋǂ ɴǂ	ʞ	
Click (top: velar; bottom: uvular)	Tenuis lateral				kǁ qǁ					
Click (top: velar; bottom: uvular)	Voiced lateral				ɡǁ ɢǁ					
Click (top: velar; bottom: uvular)	Nasal lateral				ŋǁ ɴǁ					
