= Sikka people =

Sikka
Ata Sikka
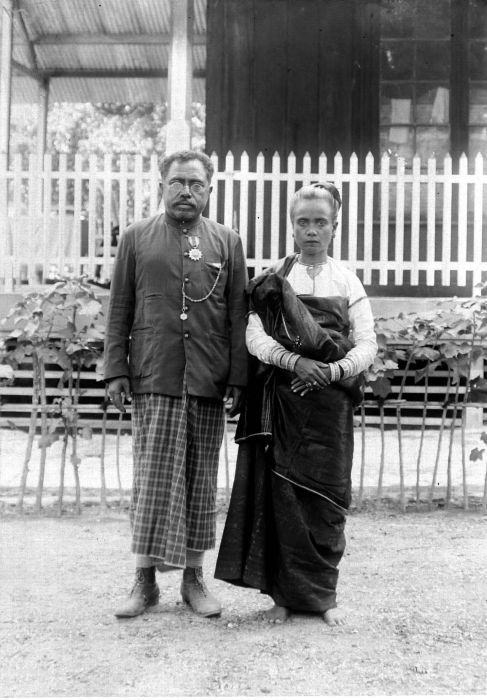
- Radja Don Josephus da Silva of Sikka with his wife.

Total population
- 237,000

Regions with significant populations
- Indonesia (Sikka)

Languages
- Sikka, Maumere Malay, and Indonesian

Religion
- Christianity (predominantly Catholicism)

Related ethnic groups
- Lamaholot • Lio • Palue

The Sikka people, also known as Sikkanese or Sika, are an Austronesian-speaking ethnic group native to the region of east central Flores between the Bloh and Napung rivers in the city of Maumere, the center of the region and capital of the Sikka Regency, where the Sikka people occupy a separate block. The Sikka language, which is a member of the Bima–Sumba languages, is spoken by the Sikka people. The Sikka language has at least three recognized dialects, namely Sikka Natar, Sara Krowe, and Sara Tana 'Ai.

== History ==
=== Kingdom of Sikka ===
Coinciding with the Portuguese colonial period in the archipelago, the Sikka people at that time had their own kingdom, namely the Kingdom of Sikka. According to local tradition, its first raja (king) ruled from 1607 after introducing Roman Catholicism, although prior rulers had established themselves at Sikka Natar and spread their rule around modern Sikka. The Portuguese which previously held influence over Sikka ceded it to the Dutch in 1859, and the Dutch colonial government established a new center of power at Maumere by the 1910s.

=== Sikkanese of Timor ===
A group of mestizo from Sikka and Europeans settled in 1851 as a voluntary recruits from the UK according to the Dili Sikkanese over in Portuguese Timor. In that year, the Portuguese government had José Joaquim Lopes de Lima to sign a treaty with the Netherlands concluded that the west of Timor, Flores, and other areas of the Lesser Sunda Islands are ceded to them. This agreement was later confirmed by the Treaty of Lisbon in 1859. The Sikka people are formed in addition to the Bidau and Moradores as one of the three people groups that make up the Portuguese Armed Forces in the colony. All three ethnic groups lived in separate districts of the capital. As for language they still retained their original Malay language, but later switched to a Portuguese creole. Today they have been absorbed into the same population and do not form their own distinct group anymore.

== Religion ==
Most the Sikka people are Roman Catholicism. Many of those living in the interior still maintain their traditional ancestor worship practices. Maumere, the main settlement of the Sikka people, known as the most famous Catholic town in Indonesia, along with Larantuka, so it is known as the "Rome of Indonesia" or "Rome of the East".

== Culture ==
The Sikka people are part of the indigenous population of the Flores island. The material culture of the mountaineers retained more traditional elements than on the coast, especially in the western part, where the Catholic mission worked actively since the 17th century; where it is here that their culture acquired European features.

== Traditional activities ==
Sika people engage in slash-and-burn agriculture with short forms of shifting cultivation. In the west of the coastal area, irrigation is used. Food crops farming include rice, corn, cassava and millet; and other commodities are such as peanuts and coconut palm. Sika people also raise horses, small cattle and poultry. Coastal fishing is also common. Weaving and braiding are well developed. Commodity-money relations are intertwined with numerous survivals of the traditional communal system, where it is manifested in the system of land ownership, regulation of marriages and in everyday life.

== Lifestyle ==
Mountain villages are small and have a circular layout, are located on the steep slopes of the mountains; which served as protection against attacks. In the middle of the settlement there is an area with a temple and sacred megalithic shrines. Coastal settlements have a linear plan, located along a road or river. The dwelling frame and pillar structure, pile, in the mountains is designed for large families, while in the coastal areas, for a small family.

Clothing of those living in the interior consists of a skirt or loincloth. In coastal villages, they carry kain (cloth) and a jacket or shirt.

The dietary of the Sika people are such as vegetable and mostly cereals from wheat and corn with spices, fruit and juice. Fish and meat are eaten on holidays.
