= Verbmobil =

Interdisciplinary language technology research project

Verbmobil was a long-term interdisciplinary Language Technology (esp. Machine Translation) research project with the aim of developing a system that could recognize, translate and produce natural utterances and thus "translate spontaneous speech robustly and bidirectionally for German/English and German/Japanese".

Verbmobil research was carried out between 1993 and 2000 and received a total of 116 million German marks (roughly 60 million euros) in funding from Germany's Federal Ministry of Research and Technology, the Bundesministerium für Forschung und Technologie; industry partners (such as DaimlerChrysler, Siemens and Philips) contributed an additional 52 million DM (26 million euros).

In the Verbmobil II project, the University of Tübingen created semi-automatically annotated treebanks for German, Japanese and English spontaneous speech. TüBa-D/S contains approximately 38,000 sentences or 360,000 words. TüBa-E/S contains approximately 30,000 sentences or 310,000 words. TüBa-J/S contains approximately 18,000 sentences or 160,000 words.
