= Sikka language =

Austronesian language spoken in Flores, Indonesia

Sikka
- Native to: Indonesia
- Region: Flores
- Ethnicity: Sikka
- Native speakers: (180,000 cited 1995)
- Language family: Austronesian: Malayo-Polynesian; Central–Eastern MP; Flores–Lembata; Sikka

Language codes
- ISO 639-3: ski
- Glottolog: sika1262

The Sikka language or Sikkanese, also known as Sika, is spoken by around 180,000 people of the Sikka ethnic group on Flores island in East Nusa Tenggara province, Indonesia. It is a member of the Central Malayo-Polynesian branch of the Austronesian language family.

Sikka is notable for being one of the few languages which contain a non-allophonic labiodental flap. Like many other languages in eastern Indonesia, it shows evidence of having a Papuan (non-Austronesian) substratum, but in the case of Sika, this includes extreme morphological simplification and about 20% lexical replacement in basic vocabulary. It has been hypothesized that the Austronesian languages in that area could be descendants of a creole language, resulting from the intrusion of Austronesian languages into eastern Indonesia.

Sika has at least three recognized dialects:

- Sikka Natar, which is generally perceived in the region to be the most refined and most prestigious of the Sika speech varieties.
- Sara Krowe, spoken in the central hills of Sika-speaking people.
- Ata Tana 'Ai or Sara Tana 'Ai, used by both outsiders and insiders to refer to the people and language of the region; it is also used as a ritual language.

== Phonology ==
=== Consonants ===
Sika has the following consonant phonemes:

		Labial	Dental	Palatal	Velar	Glottal
Nasal		m	n		ŋ	
Plosive/ Affricate	voiceless	p	t		k	ʔ
Plosive/ Affricate	voiced	b	d	d͡ʒ	g	
Fricative		β	s			h
Approximant			l			
Vibrant		ⱱ	r			

=== Vowels ===
Sika has the following vowel phonemes:

	Front	Central	Back
Close	i		u
Mid	e	ə	o
Open		a	

== Bibliography ==
- Gil, David (2015). "The Mekong-Mamberamo linguistic area". In N. J. Enfield; Bernard Comrie (eds.). Languages of Mainland Southeast Asia: The State of the Art. Walter de Gruyter GmbH & Co KG. p. 334. ISBN 978-1-5015-0168-5.
- Lewis, Ε. D.; Grimes, Charles E. (1995). "Sika". In Tryon, Darrell T. (ed.). Comparative Austronesian Dictionary: An Introduction to Austronesian Studies. Berlin: Walter de Gruyter. ISBN 3-1108-8401-1.
