= Mono language (Congo) =

Banda language of DR Congo

Mono
- Native to: Democratic Republic of the Congo
- Region: Northwestern corner of Congo (DRC)
- Native speakers: (65,000 cited 1984 census)
- Language family: Niger–Congo?: Atlantic–Congo; Volta–Congo; Savanna?; Ubangian; Banda; Central Banda; Mid-Southern; Mono

Language codes
- ISO 639-3: mnh
- Glottolog: mono1270
- ELP: Mono (Democratic Republic of the Congo)

Mono is an indigenous language spoken by about 65,000 people in the northwestern corner of the Democratic Republic of the Congo. It is one of the Banda languages, a subbranch of the Ubangian branch of the Niger–Congo languages. It has five dialects: Bili, Bubanda, Mpaka, Galaba, and Kaga.

== Phonology ==
Mono has 33 consonant phonemes, including three labial-velar stops (/k͡p/, /ɡ͡b/, and prenasalized /ᵑ͡ᵐɡ͡b/), an asymmetrical eight-vowel system, and a labiodental flap /ⱱ/ (allophonically a bilabial flap [ⱱ̟]) that contrasts with both /v/ and /w/. It is a tonal language.

Consonants
		Labial	Alveolar	Post-alv./ Palatal	Velar	Labial- Velar	Glottal
Nasal		m ⟨m⟩	n ⟨n⟩	ɲ ⟨ny⟩			
Plosive/ Affricate	Voiceless	p ⟨p⟩	t ⟨t⟩	tʃ ⟨tsh⟩	k ⟨k⟩	k͡p ⟨kp⟩	ʔ ⟨'⟩
Plosive/ Affricate	Voiced	b ⟨b⟩	d ⟨d⟩	dʒ ⟨dj⟩	g ⟨g⟩	ɡ͡b ⟨gb⟩	
Plosive/ Affricate	Prenasalized	ᵐb ⟨mb⟩	ⁿd ⟨nd⟩	ⁿdʒ ⟨ndj⟩	ᵑɡ ⟨ng⟩	ᵑ͡ᵐɡ͡b ⟨ngb⟩	
Plosive/ Affricate	Implosive	ɓ ⟨'b⟩	ɗ ⟨'d⟩				
Fricative	Voiceless	f ⟨f⟩	s ⟨s⟩	ʃ ⟨sh⟩			h ⟨h⟩
Fricative	Voiced	v ⟨v⟩	z ⟨z⟩	ʒ ⟨j⟩			
Trill/Tap		ⱱ ~ ⱱ̟ ⟨vw⟩	r ⟨r⟩				
Approximant			l ⟨l⟩	j ⟨y⟩		w ⟨w⟩	

Vowels
	Front	Central	Back
Close	i ⟨i⟩	ɨ ⟨ɨ⟩	u ⟨u⟩
Close-mid	e ⟨e⟩	ə ⟨œ⟩	o ⟨o⟩
Open-mid		ə ⟨œ⟩	ɔ ⟨ɔ⟩
Open		a ⟨a⟩	

Tones
	High	Mid	Low
IPA	˥ ⟨á⟩	˧ ⟨ā⟩	˩ ⟨à⟩
Transcription	á	a	à
Example	áwá ⟨áwá⟩	āwā ⟨awa⟩	àwà ⟨àwà⟩
English Meaning	"diarrhea"	"road"	"fear"

== Sample text ==
The North Wind and the Sun text was translated into Mono by Gaspard Yalemoto Suma, Marie Sungayase Yalemoto, Kilio Mapuya and Ama Geangozo. The translation is based on the French version of the text found in Fougeron & Smith (1993). The text was read by a male native speaker of Mono, about 35 years old. The individual words illustrating the various sounds were read by a male native speaker of Mono, about 40 years old.

Ayigu endje dœ ɔlɔ pa lima gbarama. Uzu dœ uzu pa lima adeke, œnœ da sœ dœ gbɔgbɔ kœdo pa nœ. Lɔkɔ endje wu anga gene bale a tshe dje lœba ɨzɨ gatœ ɨgɨ ye. Kœndo dœ endje, endje tɔ adeke uzu a tshé kàkara lœba tœ ɨgɨ ye da sœ gbɔgbɔ kœro pa nœ. Tœrale yigu na kpɨ, kpɨ, kpɨ, kpɨ. Kpɨ, kpɨ, kpɨ gba, gene nœ kpa soro lœba nœ gatœ ye. Œrrrœ yigu Totoro kœkakara tœ ɨgɨ ye. Manda nœ, ɔlɔ kpa tɔ vwege, vwege, vwege, Osho wo tœ gene. Tshe vwara lœba nœ tœ ɨgɨ ye. Yigu wu atamœ, œ yi ndœ nœ adeke ɔlɔ do pa nœ dœ gbɔgbɔ.
