= Finger cot =

Personal protective equipment

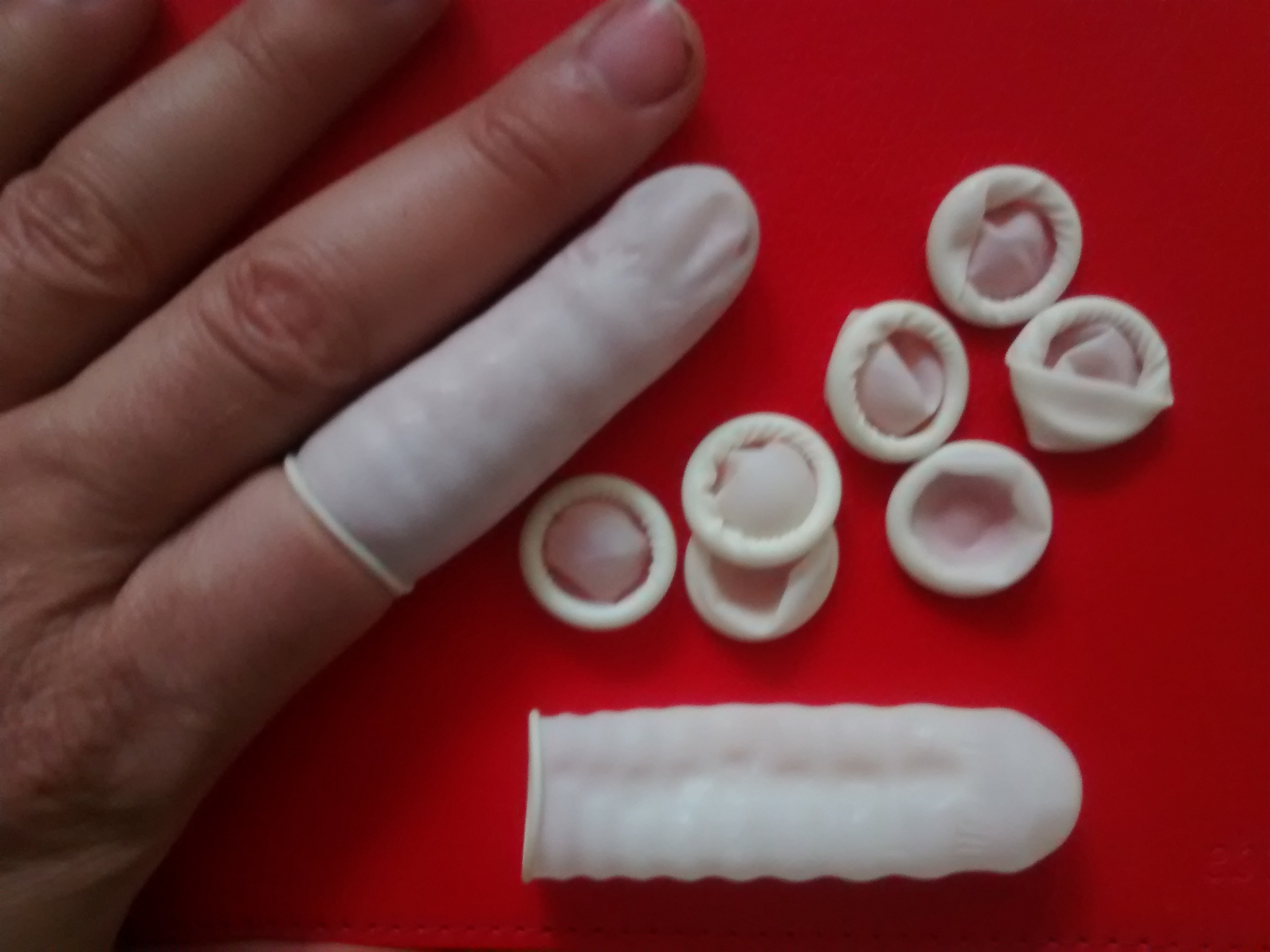
Finger cots

A finger cot (also finger frock or finger stall, informally finger condom) is used to cover one or more fingers in situations where a full glove seems unnecessary. Like medical and rubber gloves, finger cots may be made from a variety of water-tight materials including latex, nitrile rubber, and vinyl.

A toe protector or toe cap is very similar, but shorter and of greater diameter. The function is not so much to prevent contamination—toes are normally contained within footwear that protects them—but to protect an injured toe against further damage from friction and pressure by continual rubbing against other toes and shoes. They are consequently made partly or wholly of a soft material such as a mineral oil gel, and the end may be either open or closed.

== Medical use ==
They are used in medicine to limit patient exposure to infection, and to protect health professionals from contact with bodily fluids that can transmit disease. Finger cots can be used in a wide scope of medical procedures and examinations, for example, when applying a topical medication or during digital rectal examination. Finger cots may be used when bandaging a finger to secure the dressing and keep it dry. The term "fyngyr stalle" was recorded in 1483; "cot" has been used since 1617. Early stalls were usually made of leather.

Finger cots can also used as a protective barrier during sexual activities such as fingering to help reduce the risk of sexually transmitted infections; however, some sources recommend using a full glove instead for better protection. Finger cots are not intended to replace condoms for penetrative sex.

== In the workplace ==
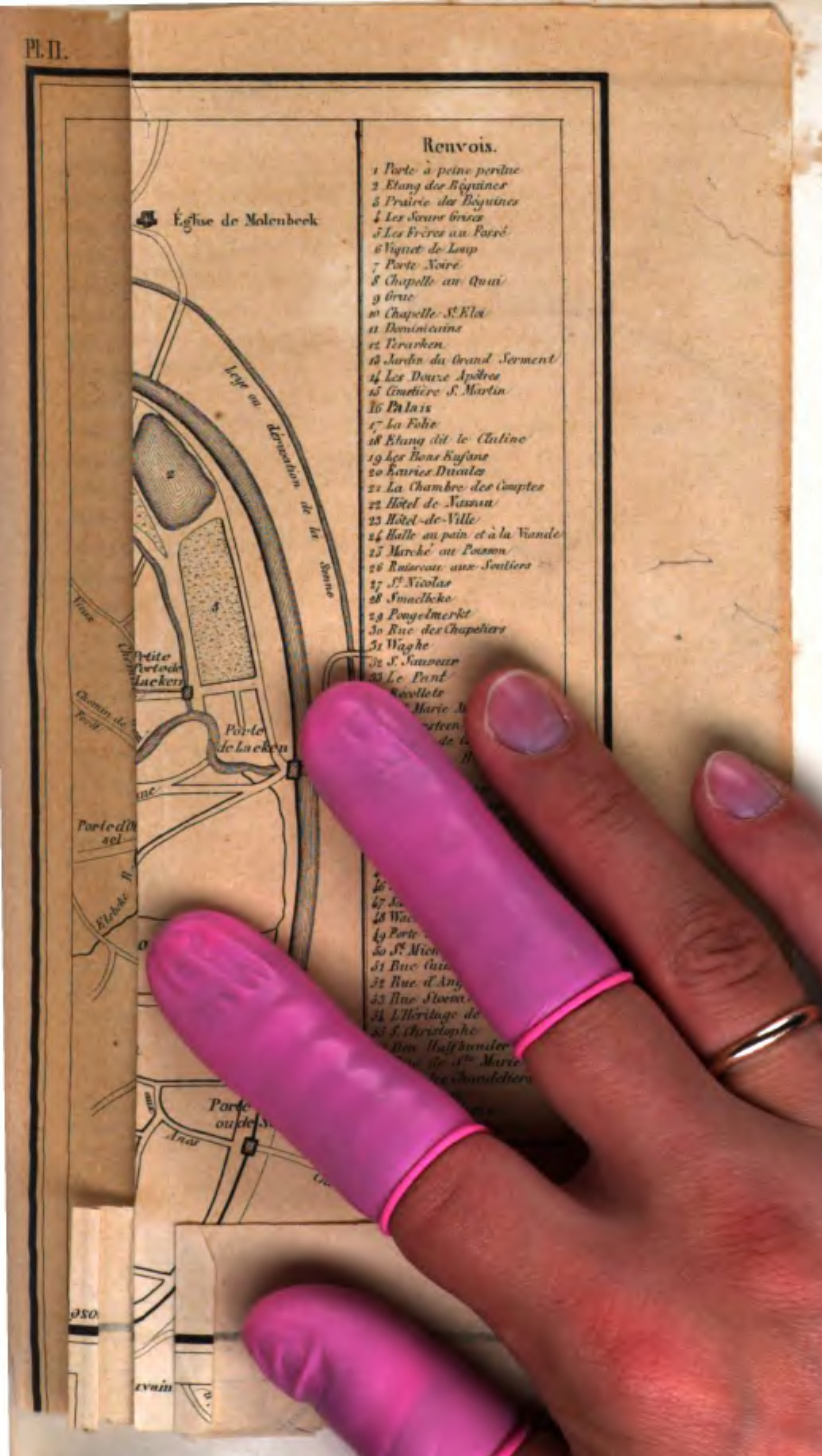
Finger cots being worn while digitising an antiquarian book

Finger cots have applications in many workplaces, mainly to protect objects which can be damaged by exposure to the skin's natural oils, skin particles, and dirt on hands. In electronics manufacturing, e.g., the manufacture of semiconductors, finger cots are used while handling such components. In watchmaking they are used to protect delicate watch parts. In art conservation and restoration they protect works of art from contamination which can have detrimental effects over time. In jobs that require labor with the hands, such as automobile repair or cooking, finger cots may be used to protect and isolate an injured finger.

Thimblettes (also known as rubber fingers, banker's friend, rubber thimbles and finger cones) are soft thimbles, made predominantly of rubber, used primarily for leafing through or counting documents, bank notes, tickets, or forms. They also protect against paper cuts as a secondary function.

== Other uses ==
Finger cots have been used during the COVID-19 pandemic to limit contamination for voters using touch-screen voting systems in the 2020 U.S. elections.

Finger cots can also be used as a picking barrier for people with dermatillomania.

== See also ==
- Finger sleeve
- Personal protective equipment
- Thimble
