= Mutti =

Mutti may refer to:

== People ==
- Angela Merkel (nicknamed "Mutti", German for "mummy"), German politician;
- Mutti (surname), Italian surname.

== Species ==
- Eosentomon mutti (E. mutti), a species of Caribbean arthropod.

== See also ==
- Mutti Mutti people
- Mutti Mutti language
- Mutti (company), Italian company that specializes in preserved food
- Ramón Muttis (1899–1955), Argentine soccer player
- Muti (disambiguation)
