= Mutti (surname) =

Mutti is a surname. Notable people with the surname include:

- Albert Frederick Mutti (born 1938), American Bishop of the United Methodist Church
- Bortolo Mutti (born 1954), Italian soccer player and manager
- Callisto Mutti, co-founder of Mutti (company)
- Chisanda Mutti (1957–1999), Zambian boxer
- Emiliano Mutti (born 1933), Italian geologist
- Jethro Mutti (1934–2013), Zambian politician
- Marcellino Mutti (1862–1941), co-founder of Mutti (company)
- Nelly Mutti (born 1956), Zambian lawyer

== See also ==
- Mutti (disambiguation)
