= Mutis (disambiguation) =

Mutis may refer to:

== People ==
- Álvaro Mutis (1923–2013), Colombian poet
- Guido Mutis (1934–2008), Chilean professor of English
- Jeff Mutis (born 1966), U.S. baseball player
- José Celestino Mutis (1732–1808), Spanish priest, mathematician, botanist
- Julio Carrizosa Mutis, Colombian businessman
- Mario Mutis (born 1947), Chilean musician
- Olivier Mutis (born 1978), French tennis player

== Places ==
- Mount Mutis, a mountain in West Timor, East Nusa Tenggara, Indonesia.
- Mutis, a district in North Central Timor Regency, East Nusa Tenggara, Indonesia

== Other uses ==
- "Mutis", a botanical abbreviation for José Celestino Mutis
- Castilleja mutis (C. mutis), a herbaceous flowering plant

== See also ==
- Ramón Muttis (1899–1955), Argentinian soccer player
- Muthis, Egyptian pharaoh
- Muti (disambiguation)
