= John Lofting =

Dutch engineer (1659–1742)

Jan Lofting
- Born: Jan Loftingh; 1659
- Died: 15 June 1742 (aged 82–83)

John Lofting (1659 – 15 June 1742, London), originally Jan Loftingh, was an engineer and entrepreneur from the Dutch Republic.

== Biography ==
His parents were Herman and Johanna. He moved to London, England, before 1686. He patented two inventions: the "sucking worm engine" (a fire engine) and a horse-powered thimble knurling machine. His mill was set up in Islington, where Lofting Road is named after him. However, in or about 1700, he moved his main operation to Great Marlow in Buckinghamshire to take advantage of the River Thames' ability to turn a water wheel which improved productivity, enabling the production of over 2 million thimbles per year.
