= Muti (disambiguation) =

A muti is a term for traditional medicine in Southern Africa.

Muti may also refer to:

== People ==
- al-Muti (914–974), Abbasid Caliph in Baghdad
- Muti Randolph, Brazilian architect
- Abdullah-Al-Muti (1930–1998), Bangladeshi educationist, scientist and writer

=== Surname ===
- Abd Allah ibn Muti (died 692), Qurayshi governor of Kufa
- Ibn Muti al-Zawawi (1168–1232), medieval Muslim grammarian
- Tiberio Muti (1574–1636), Roman Catholic cardinal
- Valeriano Muti (died 1610), Roman Catholic bishop
- Ettore Muti (1902–1943), Italian Fascist politician
- Ahmed Abdel Muti Hijazi (born 1935), Egyptian poet
- Abdelkrim Motii (born 1935), Algerian schoolteacher and politician
- Riccardo Muti (born 1941), conductor
- Zayd Mutee' Dammajj (1943–2000), Yemeni author and politician
- Ornella Muti (born 1955), actress
- Netane Muti (born 1999), Tongan-American football player

== Places ==
- Palazzo Muti, Rome, Italy; an historic house
- Villa Muti, Frascati, Italy; a historic villa
- Muti, Estonia, a village

== Other uses ==
- Muti (film), U.S. action-thriller film

== See also ==
- Muti Muti people, alternative name for Muthi Muthi people
- Muti Muti language, alternative name for Madhi Madhi language
- Mutis (disambiguation)
- Mutti (disambiguation)
