= Charles Horner (jeweller) =

British jeweller (1837–1896)

- Born: 1837; Ovenden
- Died: 1896 (aged 58–59)
- Occupation: Jeweller

Charles Horner (1837–1896) was an English jeweller and founder of the Halifax jewellery business Charles Horner of Halifax.

== Life ==
He was born at Ovenden.

Horner's business was founded in the 1860s and was based at 23 Northgate, Halifax. It produced silver jewellery and ornaments. Among its better-known jewellery lines were enamelled Art Nouveau pendants and necklaces, twisted silver wire and glass paste 'knot' brooches, and silver hatpins.

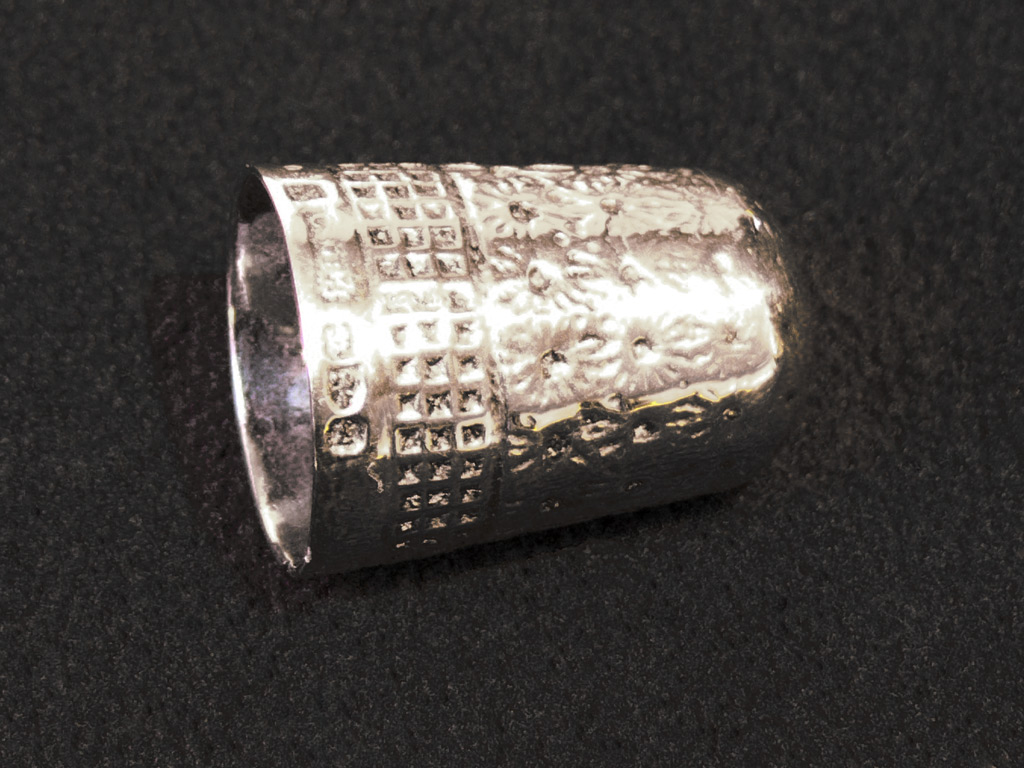
Nineteenth century silver thimble by Horner

Horner's "Dorcas" thimbles were patented in 1884. These solved the problem of the previous soft, silver thimbles by using a sandwich of strong steel and sterling silver layers. The three layers were formed separately, stacked together, and then a protruding lip of the inner silver liner was burnished over the steel, locking into place in a groove around the outer silver decorative layer.

After his death in 1896, his two sons, James Dobson Horner and Charles Henry Horner, continued the business, in partnership with Charles William Leach. (Note: Leach is described as a 'commercial traveller', of the same address.) They expanded in 1905 with the opening of a new factory at Mile Cross, Halifax. The Charles Horner factory produced a range of products during the 20th century, together with other items like silverware, tableware and clocks.

In 1889 the partners obtained a second patent on the manufacture of 'Dorcas' thimbles. This was for a minor improvement, the provision of thicker material at the top of the thimble, the area of most wear. As this was such a minor improvement, it may have been applied for more to extend the lifetime of patent protection held by the Horner company, rather than for a specific improvement. The same partners were also granted another patent, for a similar idea of layered metal protection formed by the presswork with which they were already familiar. This was for a long-lasting yarn spindle or 'cone', where the boxwood cone was sheathed entirely in brass. Such an invention was of obvious relevance in the Pennines of Northern England, where textile spinning and weaving was such an important trade. Previous cones had been partially sheathed in brass. The softer boxwood would wear in time so that the brass became a protruding lip which then caught on the yarn. A complete sheathing would have no lip, but required the Horner's skill to devise a means of manufacturing the deep metal cone. Unusually, although Halifax and Yorkshire East of the Pennines is best known for its wool trade, the patent mentions cotton yarns specifically, generally considered a Lancashire trade, West of the Pennines.

The company is also known for hatpins, a collection of which were shown on the BBC television programme 'Antiques Roadshow' in May 2013. A small number were made in gold.

After the Great War, the Charles Horner company was one of the first to use the new plastic materials becoming available, specifically casein plastics. These were branded as 'Dorcasine'.

Thimbles continued to be produced until 1947 and the company went into voluntary liquidation in 1984.

== Hallmarks ==
As the Dorcas thimbles were partly steel they could not be hallmarked, even though the silver layers were of sterling. Silver jewellery pieces were marked at Chester and also marked with a "C H" maker's mark.

Sterling silver thimbles were also produced. These may be identified as they are hallmarked, do not carry the 'Dorcas' name and do not have the rolled lip of the Dorcas design.

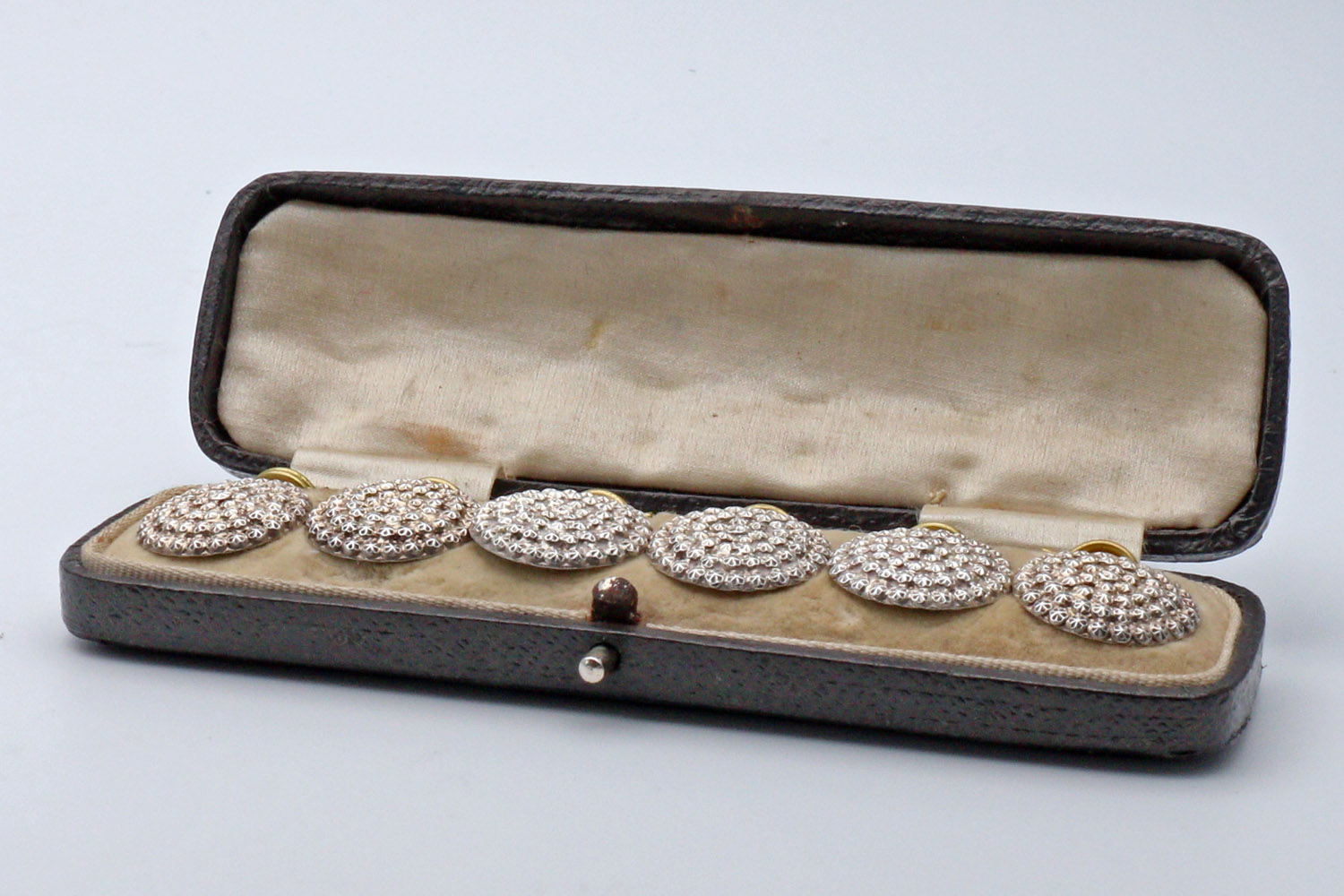
Set of six silver buttons

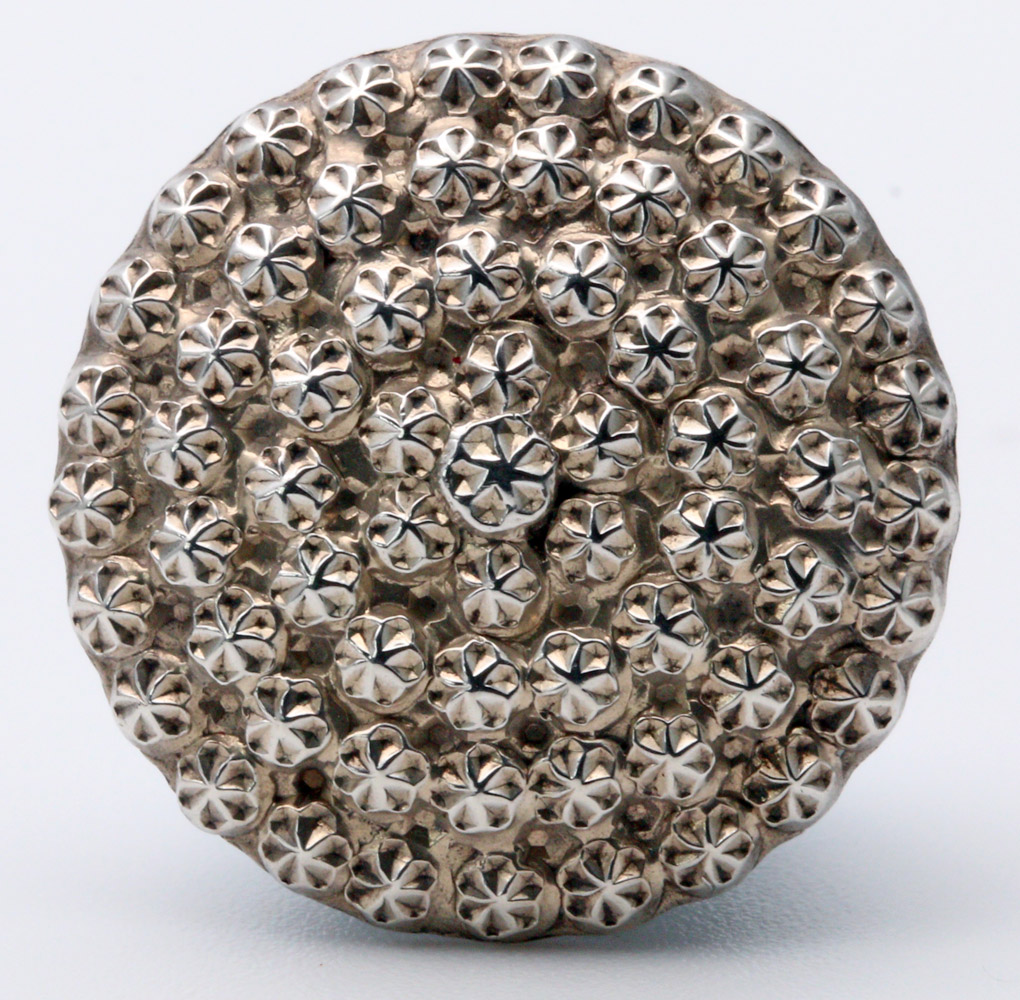
1.9 cm diameter

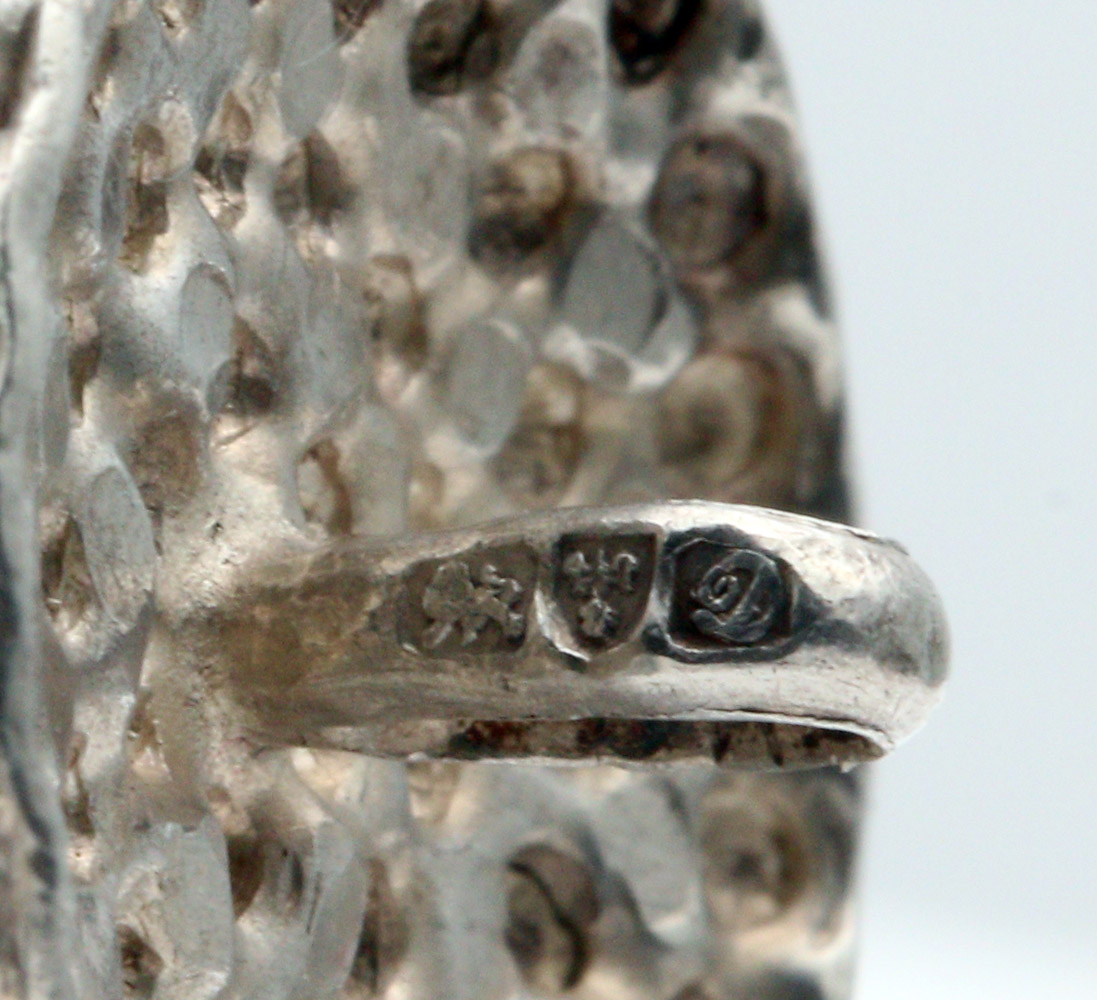
Chester 1904 hallmark on silver button

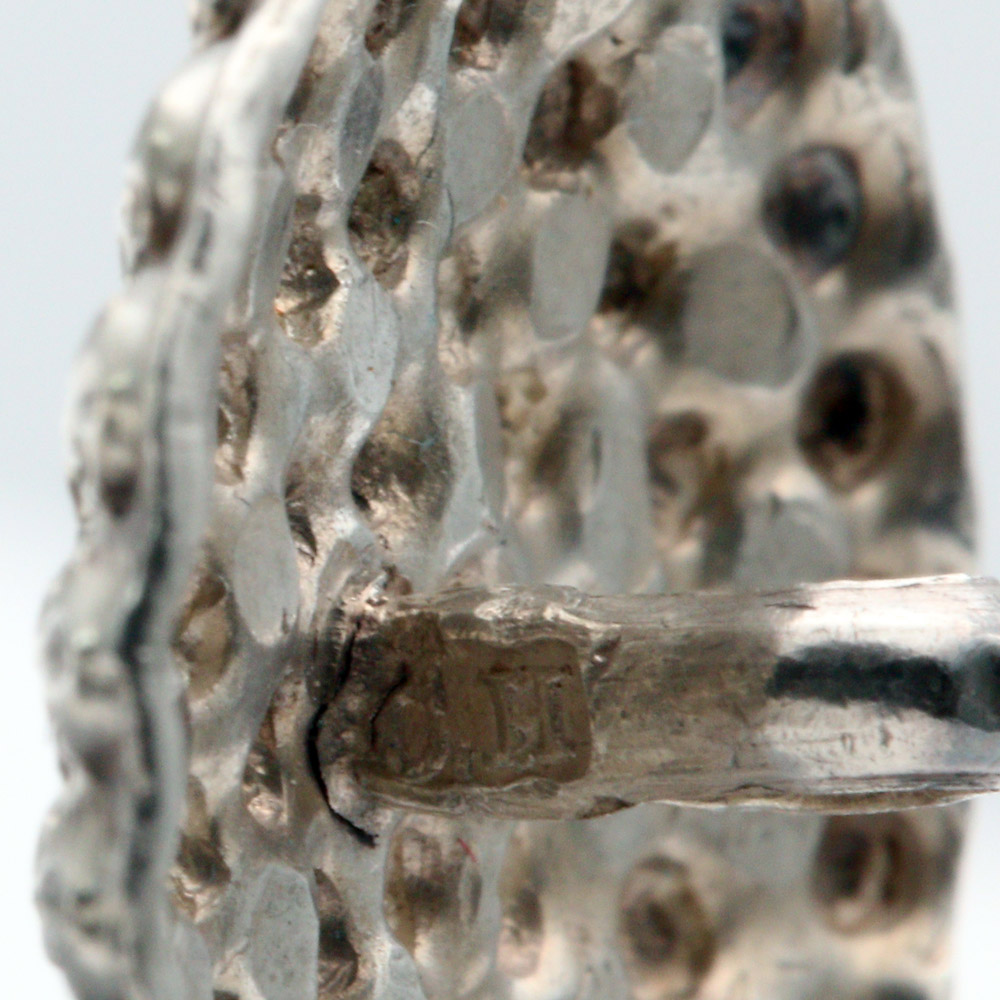
Charles Horner CH hallmark on silver button
