= Thimble =

Protective cup used during sewing

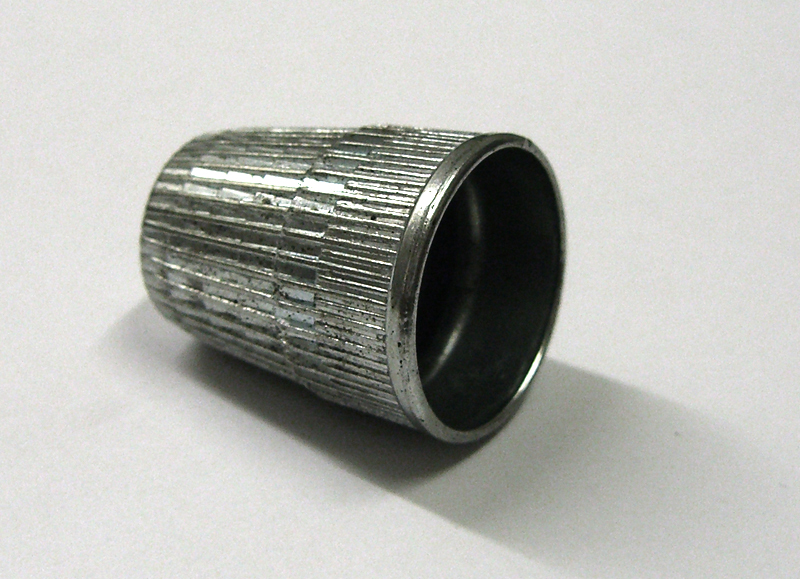
A thimble

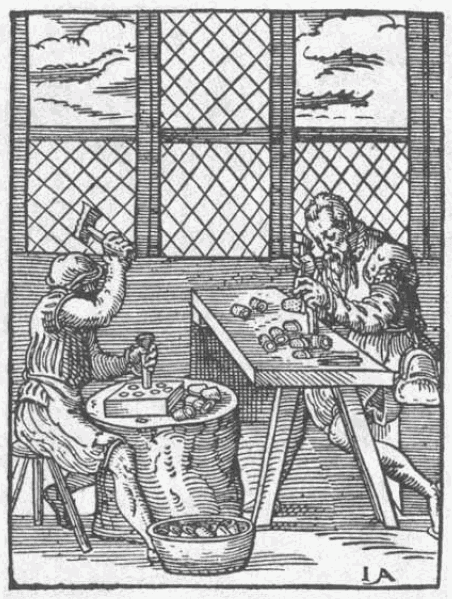
Der Fingerhüter (Thimblemaker) from Das Ständebuch by Jost Amman, 1568

A thimble is a small pitted cup worn on the finger that protects it from being pricked or poked by a needle while sewing. The Old English word þȳmel, the ancestor of thimble, is derived from Old English þūma, the ancestor of the English word thumb.

== History ==
=== Pre-17th century ===
As the purpose of a thimble is to prevent discomfort while sewing by providing a barrier between fingertips and the blunt end of a needle, it is likely that the earliest thimbles were created closely following the invention of sewing.

According to the United Kingdom Detector Finds Database, thimbles dating to the 10th century have been found in England, and thimbles were in widespread use there by the 14th century.

Although there are isolated examples of thimbles made of precious metals—Elizabeth I is said to have given one of her ladies-in-waiting a thimble set with precious stones—the vast majority of metal thimbles were made of brass. Medieval thimbles were either cast brass or made from hammered sheet. Early centers of thimble production were those places known for brass-working, starting with Nuremberg in the 15th century, and moving to Holland by the 17th.

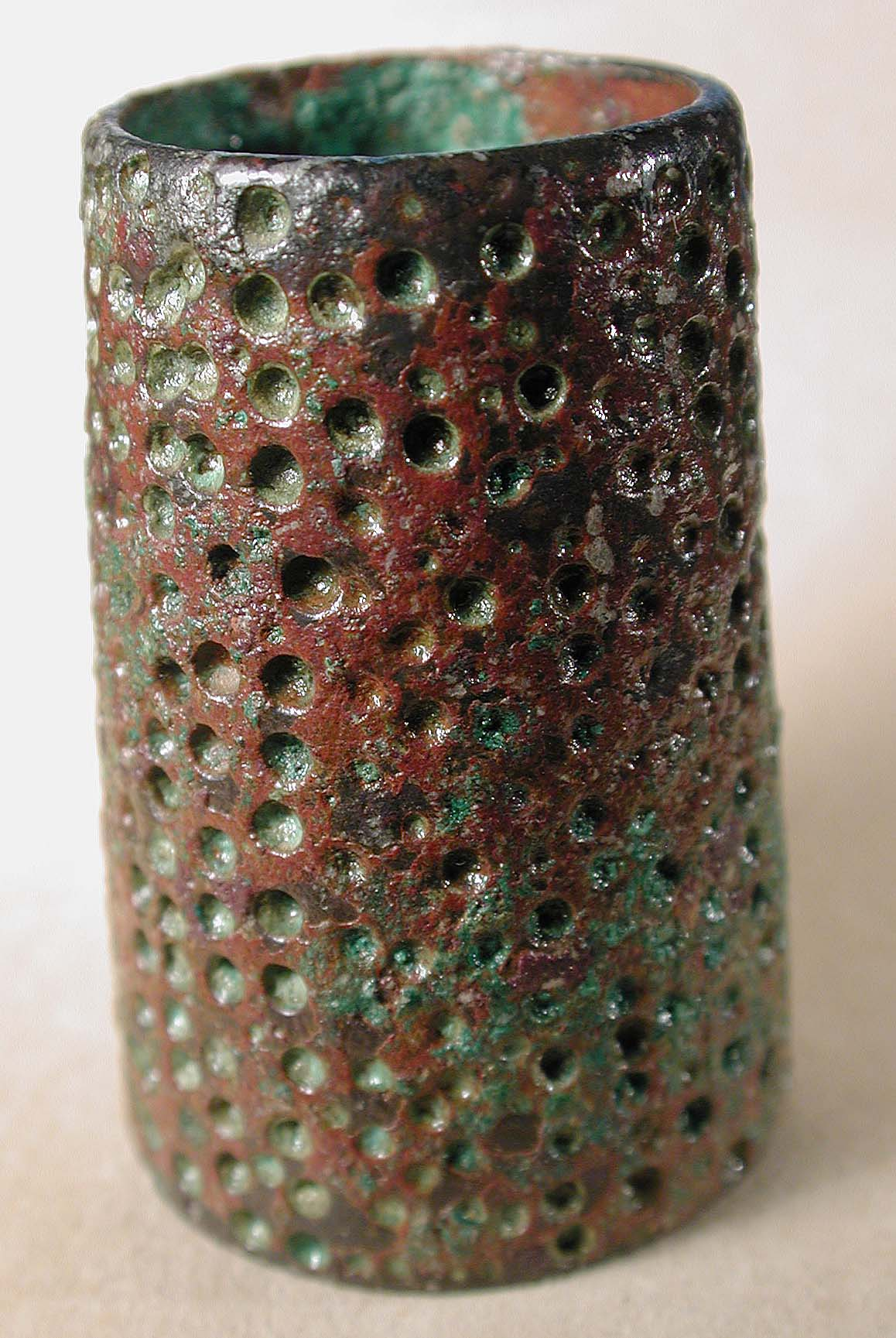
A very early hand-dimpled soldered cylinder thimble.

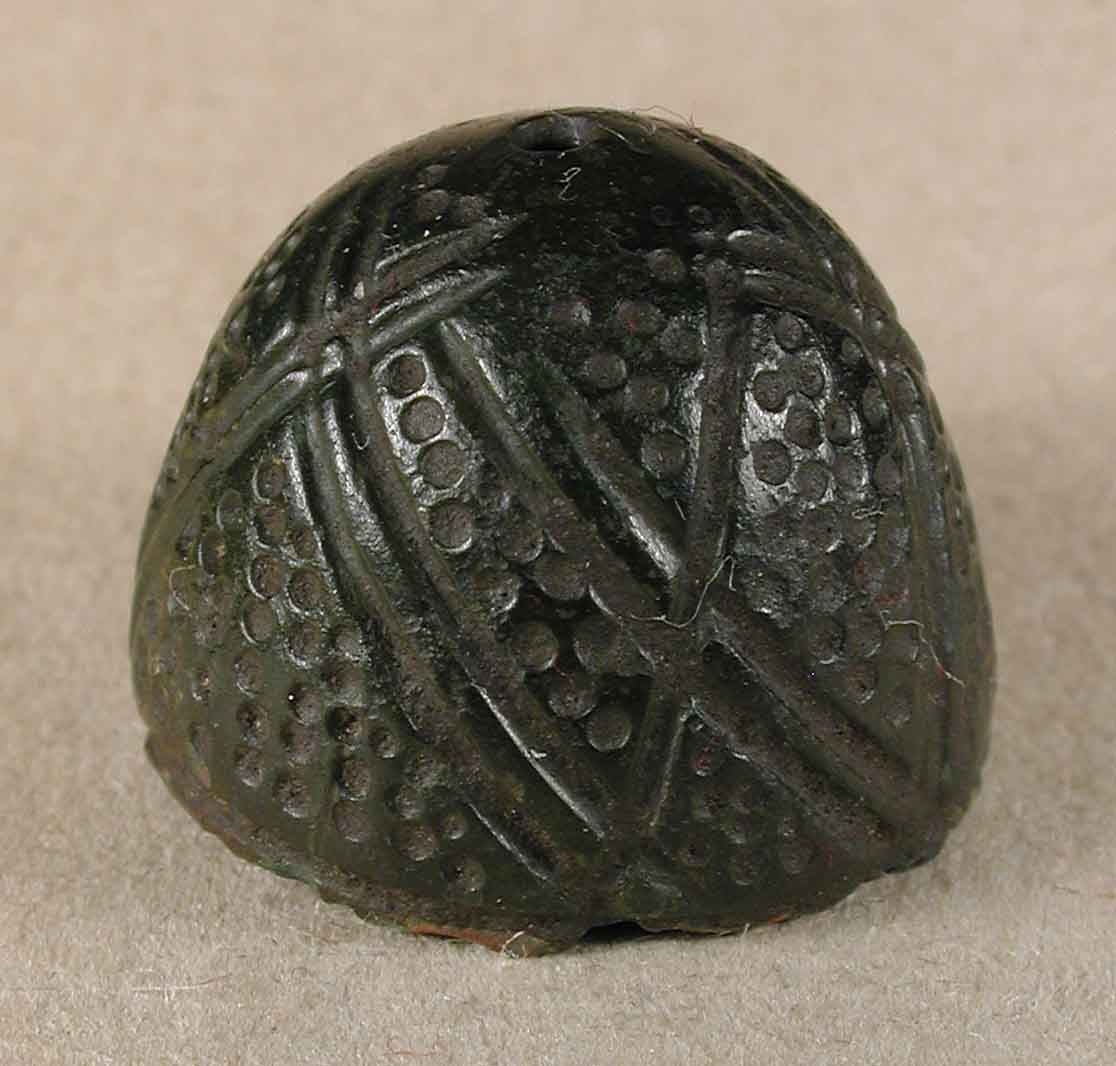
Cast 14th century thimble.

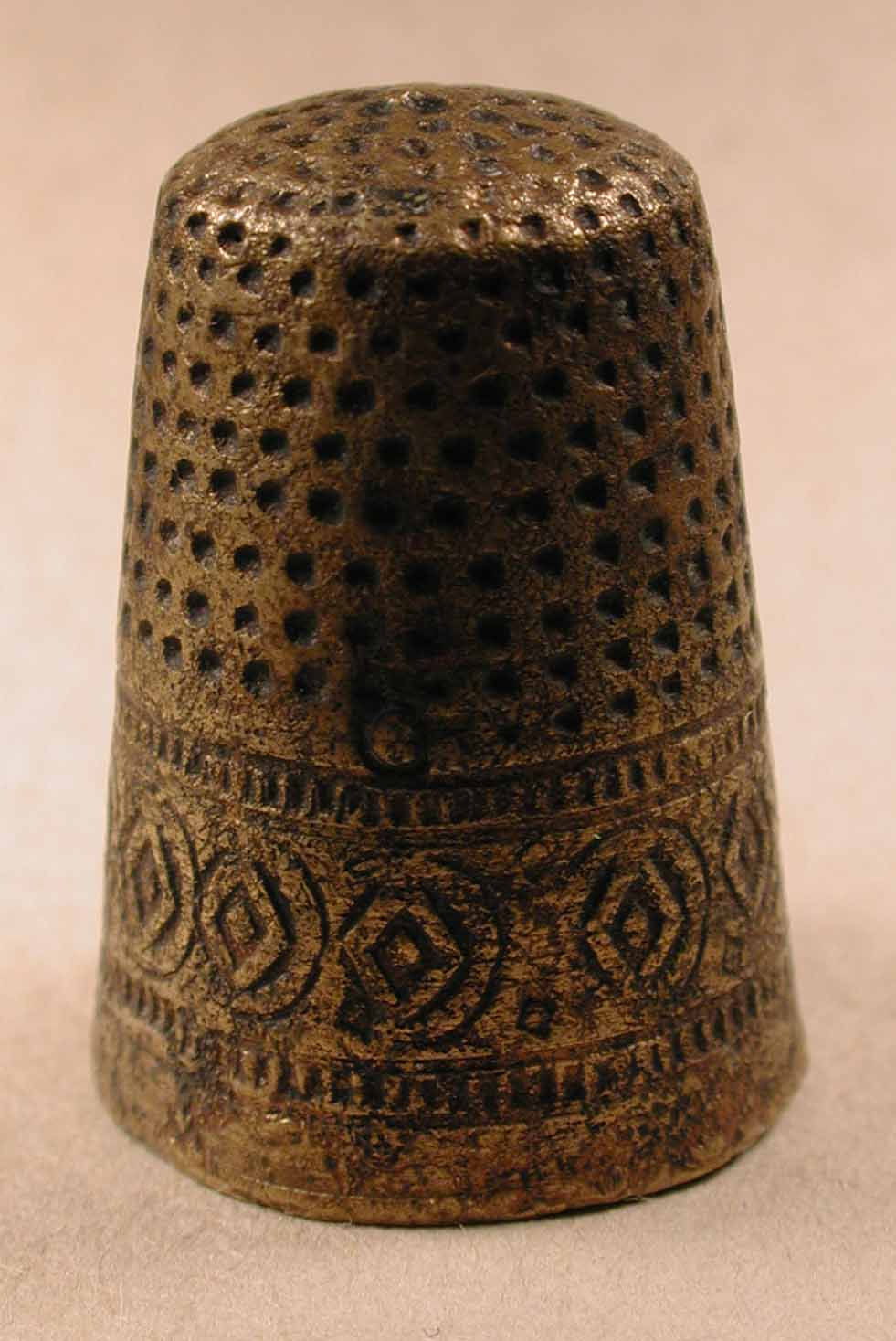
Deep drawn Nürnberg thimble. 16th century.

=== 17th century and later ===
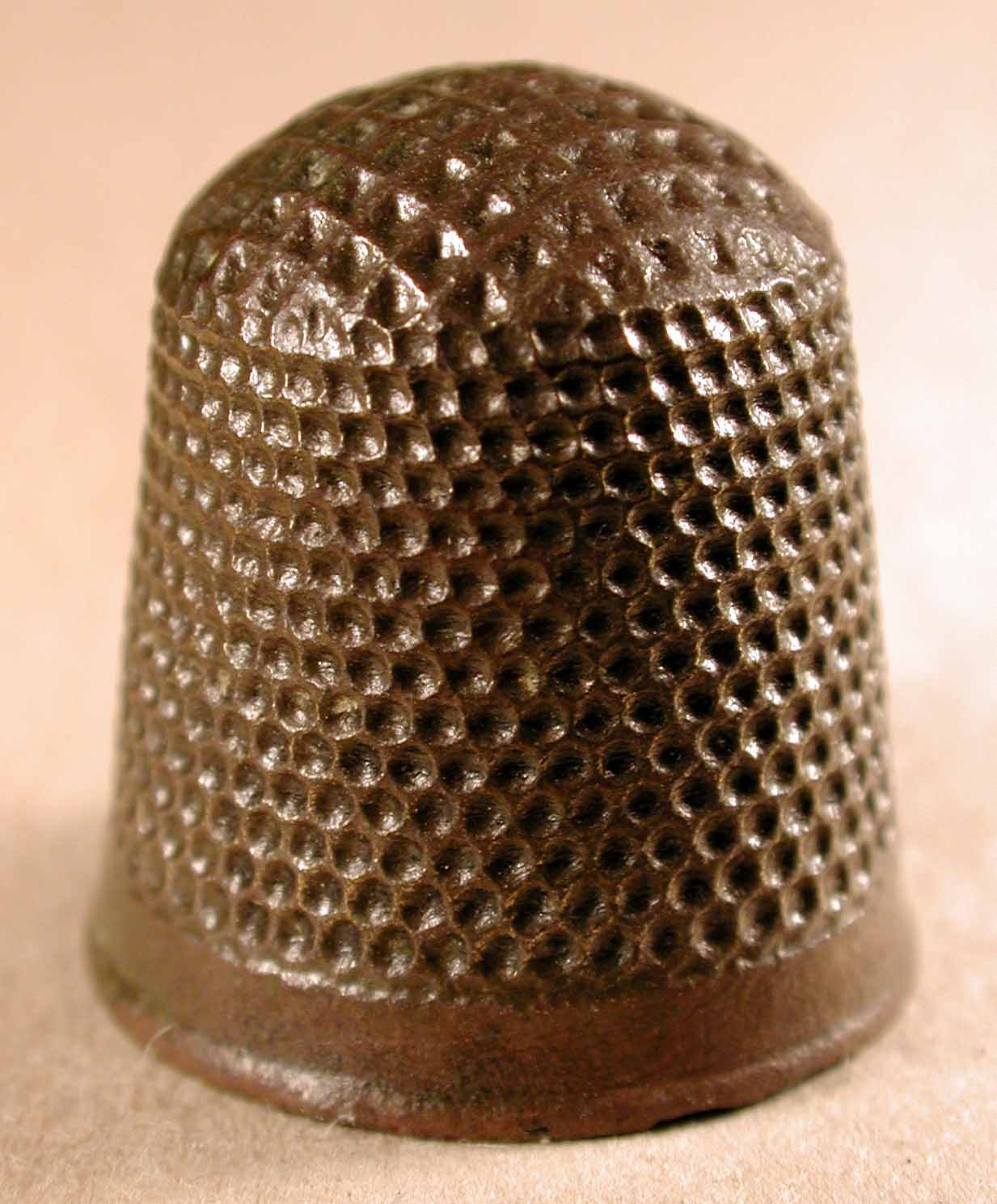
Lofting type brass thimble

In 1693, a Dutch thimble manufacturer named John Lofting established a thimble manufactory in Islington, in London, England, expanding British thimble production to new heights. He later moved his mill to Buckinghamshire to take advantage of water-powered production, resulting in a capacity to produce more than two million thimbles per year. By the end of the 18th century, thimble making had moved to Birmingham, and shifted to the "deep drawing" method of manufacture, which alternated hammering of sheet metals with annealing, and produced a thinner-skinned thimble with a taller shape. At the same time, cheaper sources of silver from the Americas made silver thimbles a popular item for the first time.

Thimbles are usually made from metal, leather, rubber, wood, and even glass or china. Early thimbles were sometimes made from whale bone, horn, or ivory. Natural sources were also used, such as Connemara marble, bog oak or mother of pearl..

Advanced thimblemakers enhanced thimbles with semi-precious stones to adorn the apex or along the outer rim. Rarer works from thimble makers used diamonds, sapphires, or rubies. Cabochon adornments are sometimes made of cinnabar, agate, moonstone, or amber. Thimble artists would also use enameling, or the Guilloché techniques advanced by Peter Carl Fabergé.

== As collectibles ==
Originally, thimbles were used simply solely for pushing a needle through fabric or leather as it was being sewn. Since then, however, they have gained many other uses. From the 16th century onwards silver thimbles were regarded as an ideal gift for ladies.

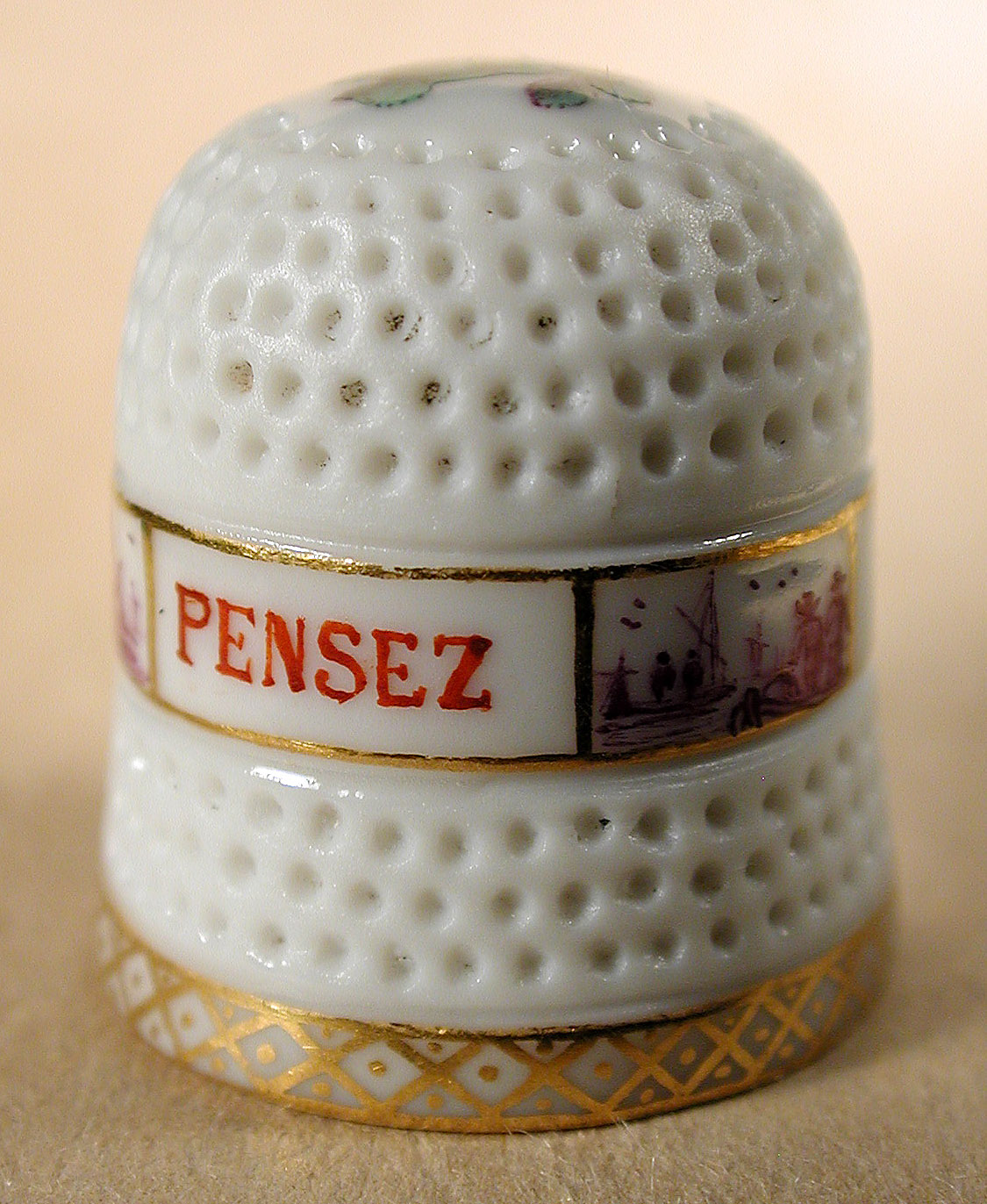
Meissen 'keepsake' thimble. 18th century

Early Meissen porcelain and elaborate, decorated gold thimbles were also given as keepsakes and were usually quite unsuitable for sewing. This tradition has continued to the present day. In the early modern period, thimbles were used to measure spirits and gunpowder, which brought rise to the phrase "just a thimbleful". Prostitutes used them in the practice of thimble-knocking where they would tap on a window to announce their presence. Thimble-knocking also refers to the practice of Victorian schoolmistresses who would tap on the heads of unruly pupils with dames thimbles.

Before the 18th century, the small dimples on the outside of a thimble were made by hand punching, but in the middle of that century, a machine was invented to do the job. A thimble with an irregular pattern of dimples was likely made before the 1850s. Another consequence of the mechanization of thimble production is that the shape and the thickness of the metal changed. Early thimbles tend to be quite thick and to have a pronounced dome on the top. The metal on later ones is thinner and the top is flatter.

Collecting thimbles became popular in the UK when many companies made special thimbles to commemorate the Great Exhibition held in the Crystal Palace in Hyde Park, London. In the 19th century, many thimbles were made from silver; however, it was found that silver is too soft a metal and can be easily punctured by most needles. Charles Horner solved the problem by creating thimbles consisting of a steel core covered inside and out by silver, so that they retained their aesthetics but were now more practical and durable. He called his thimble the Dorcas, and these are now popular with collectors. There is a small display of his work in Bankfield Museum, Halifax, England.

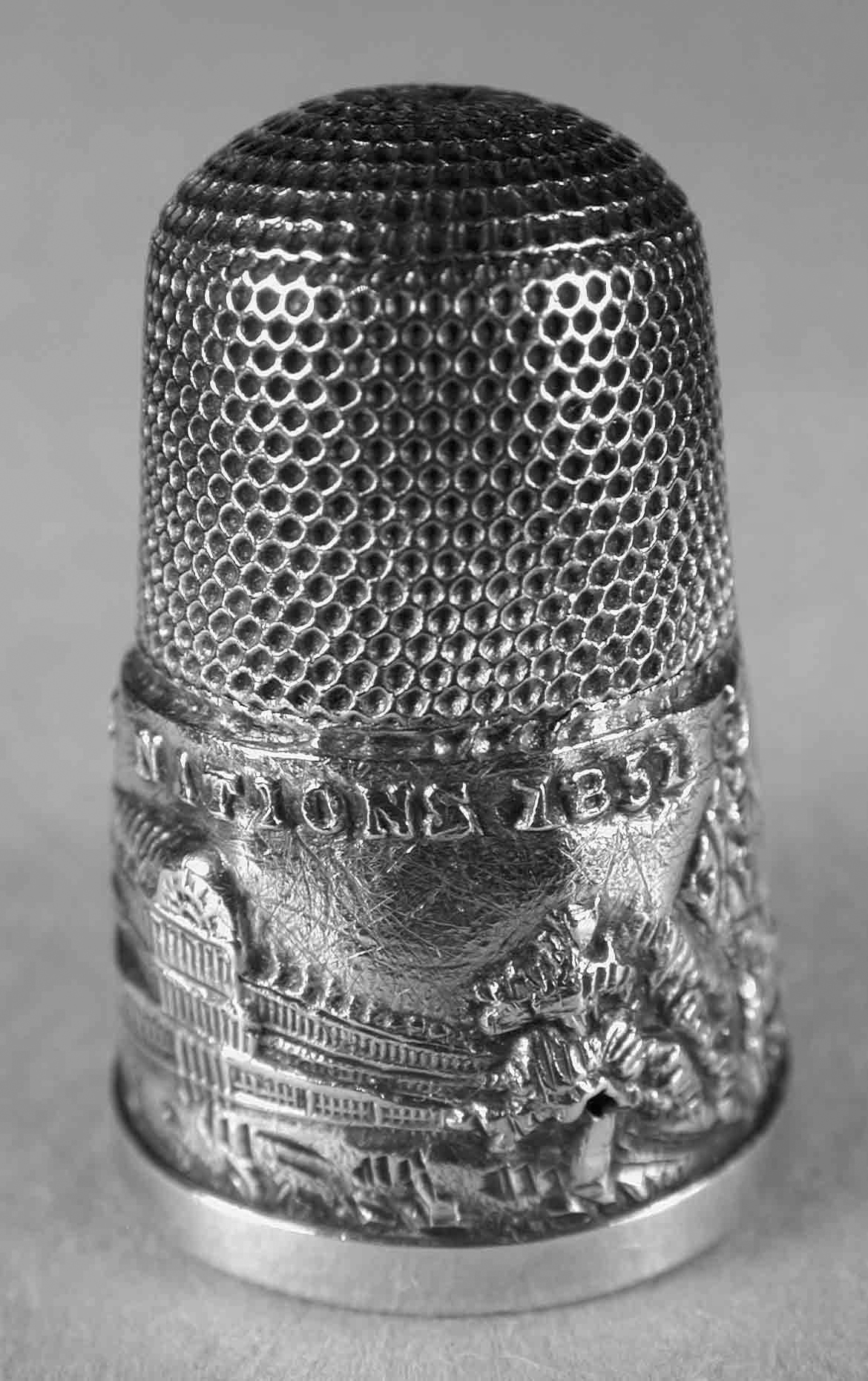
Silver thimble commemorating the Great Exhibition

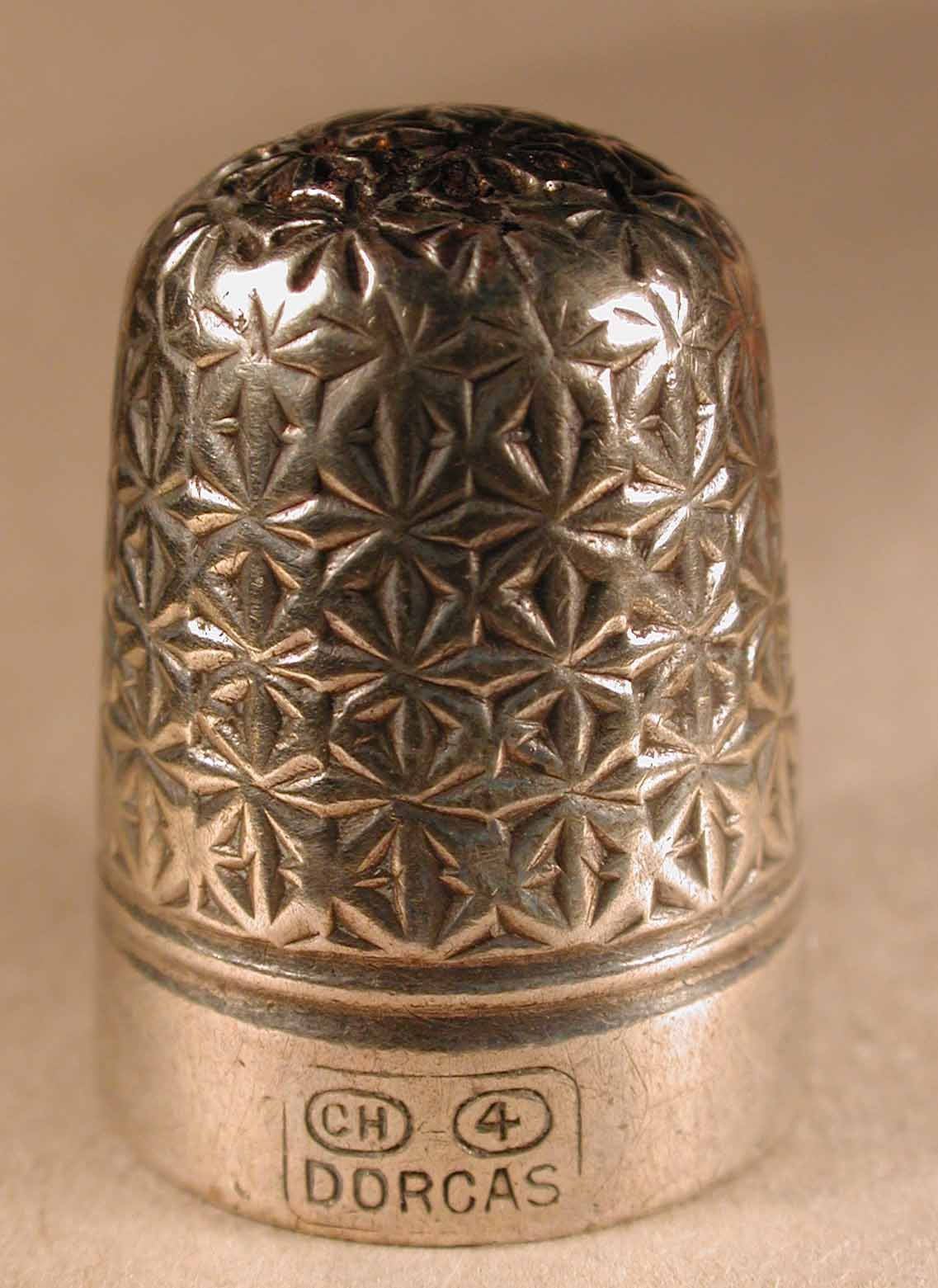
Dorcas thimble

Early American thimbles made of whale bone or tooth featuring miniature scrimshaw designs are considered valuable collectibles. Such rare thimbles are prominently featured in a number of New England Whaling Museums.

During the First World War, silver thimbles were collected from "those who had nothing to give" by the British government and melted down to buy hospital equipment. In the 1930s and 1940s glass-topped thimbles were used for advertising.

Leaving a sandalwood thimble in a fabric store was a common practice for keeping moths away. Thimbles have also been used as love-tokens and to commemorate important events. People who collect thimbles are known as digitabulists. One superstition about thimbles says that if a person has three thimbles given to them, they will never be married.

== Known thimble makers ==
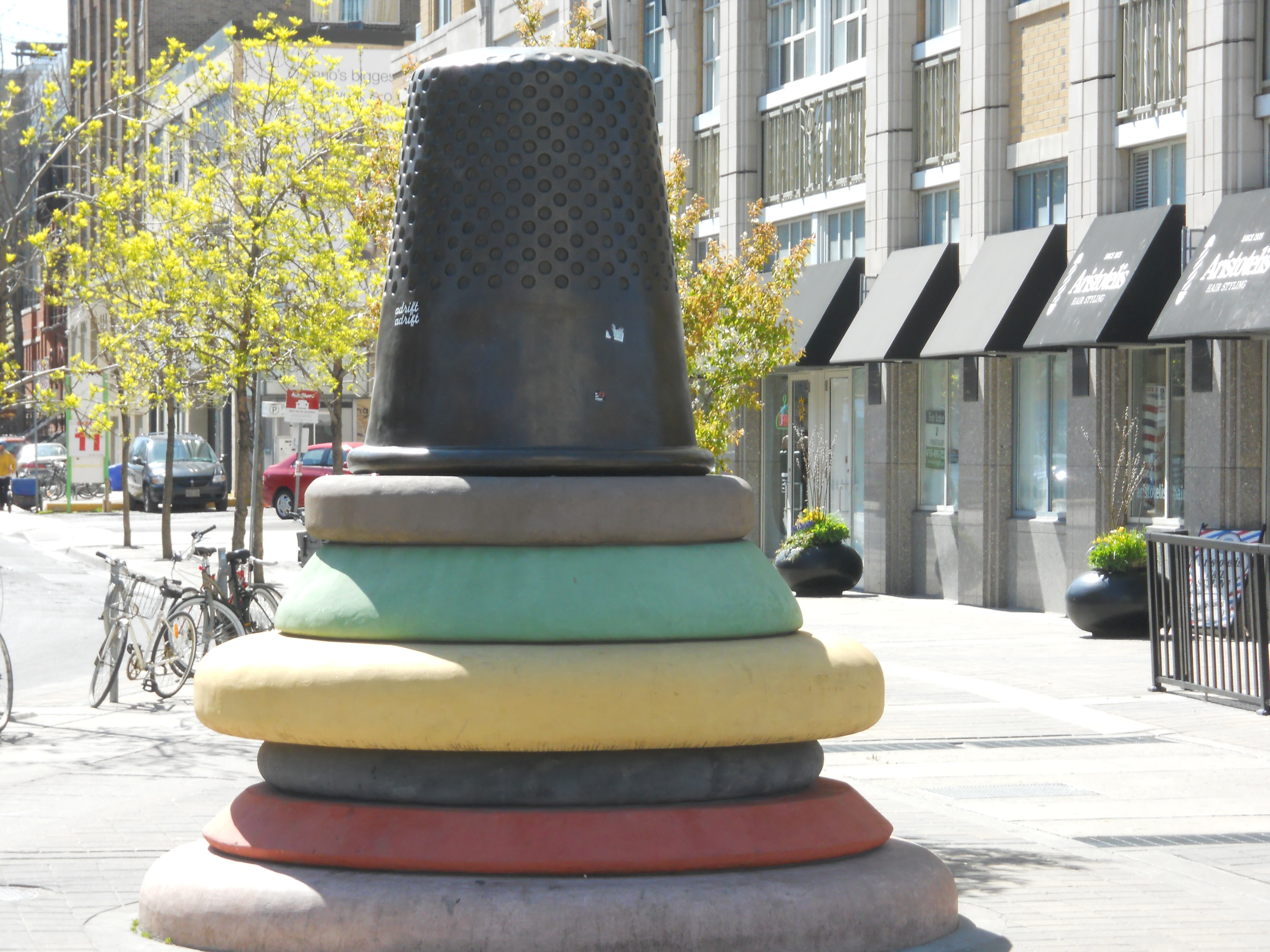
A 9-foot high sculpture of a giant thimble resting on a stack of buttons, commemorating the garment district in Toronto

Most of these thimble makers no longer create thimbles.

- Avon Fashion Thimbles
- Wicks (Inventor USA)
- A Feaù and René Lorillon (French)
- Charles Horner (UK) (1837–1896)
- Charles Iles (UK)
- Charles May
- Anthony Stavrianoudakis (GR)
- Gabler Bros (German)
- Henry Fidkin (UK)
- Henry Griffith (UK)
- James Fenton (UK)
- James Swann (UK)
- Jean Levy (France)
- Johan Caspar Rumpe (Germany)
- Ketcham & McDougall (USA)
- Meissen (German)
- Roger Lenain (French)
- Samuel & Foskett (UK)
- Simons Bros Co (USA)
- Stern Bros & Co (USA)
- Uyu (USA)
- Waite-Thresher (USA)
- Webster (USA)
- William Prym (Germany)
- Judith Apple (USA)

== Thimblette ==
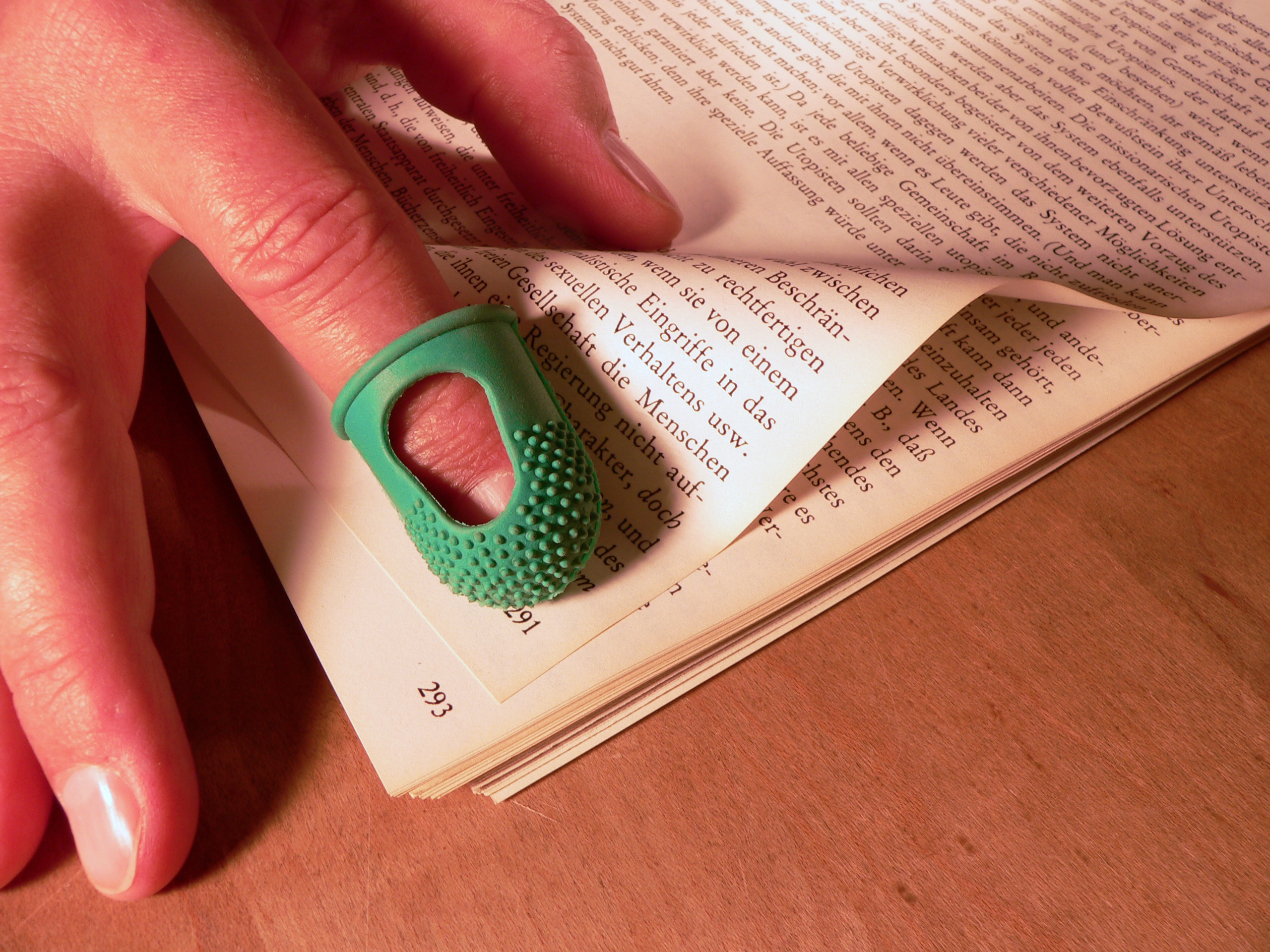
Turning pages using a thimblette.

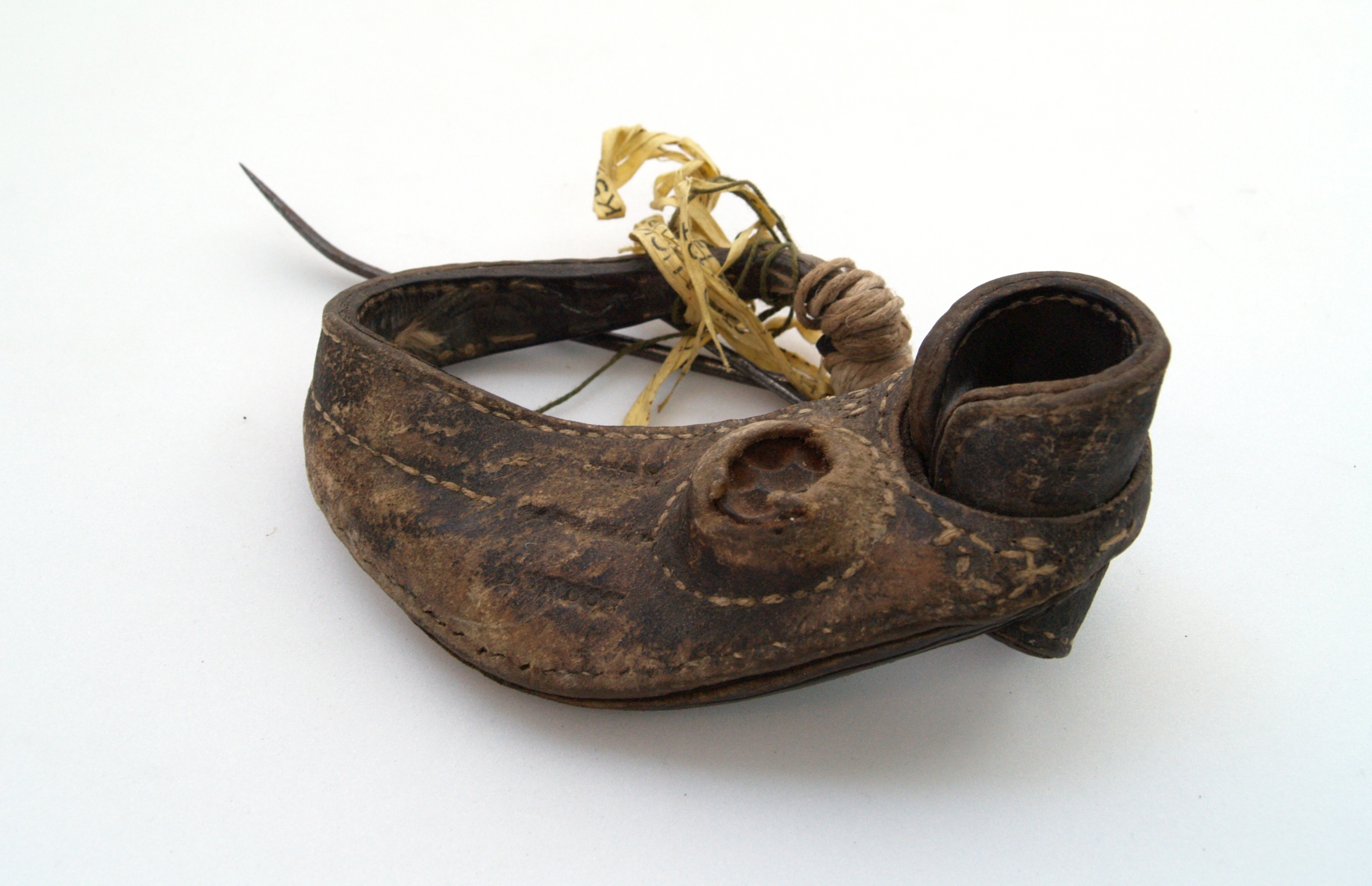
Right handed roping palm

Thimblettes (also known as rubber finger, rubber thimbles and finger cones) are soft thimbles, made predominately of rubber, used primarily for leafing through or counting documents, bank notes, tickets, or forms. They also protect against paper cuts as a secondary function. Unlike thimbles, the softer thimblettes become worn over time. They are considered disposable and sold in boxes. The surface is dimpled with the dimples inverted to provide better grip. Thimblettes are sized from 00 through to 3.

A finger cot is a smooth rubber "glove finger" used to protect the finger or the item being handled.

== Sewing palms ==
A variation on the thimble used by sailmakers and leather workers is the sail palm, also known as sailor's palm and sailmaker's palm. There are two variations, seaming palm which is used for light work, such as sewing canvas together and roping palm which is built for heavier work, such as sewing canvas and rope together. This item consists of a pitted hard plate set into a stiff leather band that is worn around the palm of the hand, with the plate resting against the first joint of the thumb. It is used by grasping a needle between the thumb and indexing finger, with the eye end of the needle against the pitted plate, and pushing the needle with the entire arm. Most palms are hand specific to give the user a better fit. This design permits the sewer to exert a great amount of force when pushing thick needles through very tough materials such as sail cloth, canvas or leather.

== Cultural references ==
In the Parker Brothers board game Monopoly, first published in 1935, the thimble was one of the eight traditional metal game pieces used to mark a player's position on the game board. However, this piece was replaced in new versions of the board game from August 2017 following public consultation.

In 2022, Hasbro again consulted the public on the removal of a current playing piece and the reintroduction of a previous one. The public voted for the return of the thimble, replacing the T-Rex.

== Auction records ==
On December 3, 1979, a London dealer bid the sum of $18,000 USD for a dentil shaped Meissen porcelain thimble, circa 1740, at Christie's auction in Geneva, Switzerland. The thimble, just over 0.5 inches (13 mm) high, was painted in a rare lemon-yellow color about the band. It also had tiny harbor scene hand painted within gold-trimmed cartouches. The rim was scalloped with fired gold on its bottom edge. The thimble now belongs to a Meissen collector in Canada.

== Additional pictures ==
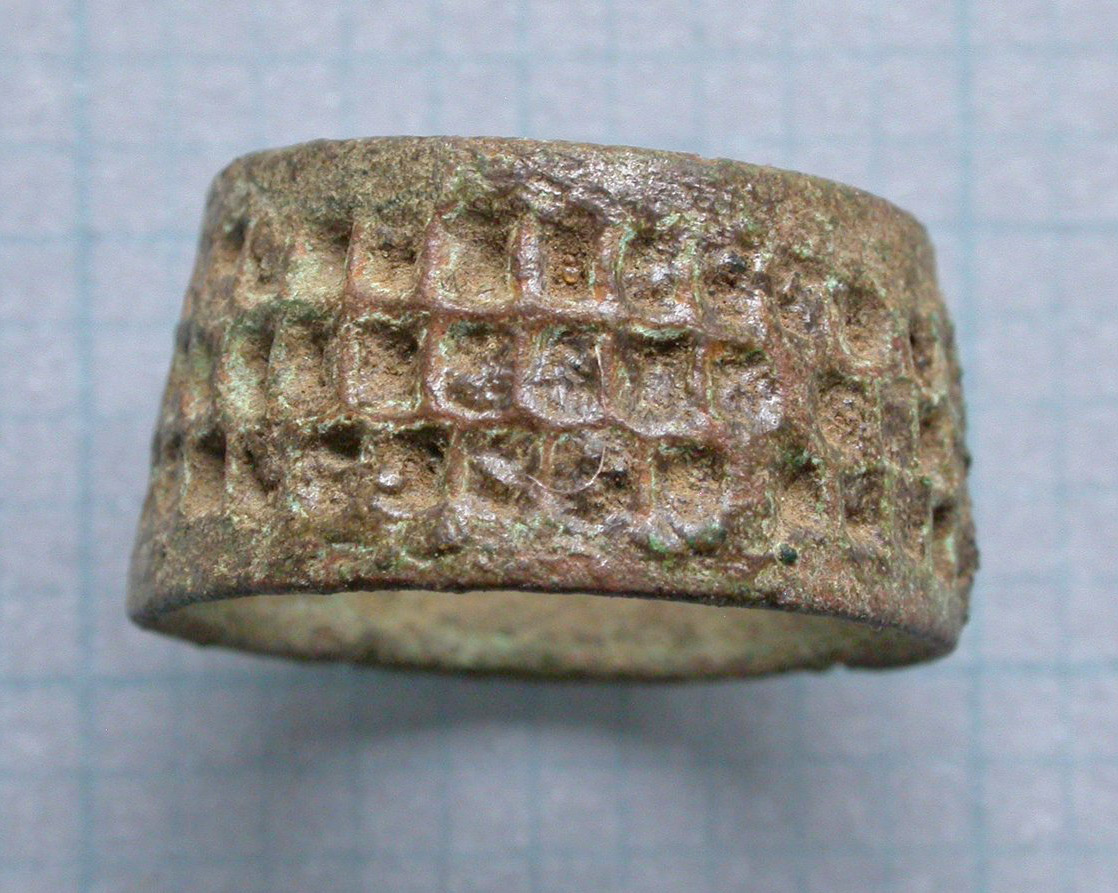
16th–17th century English copper sewing ring

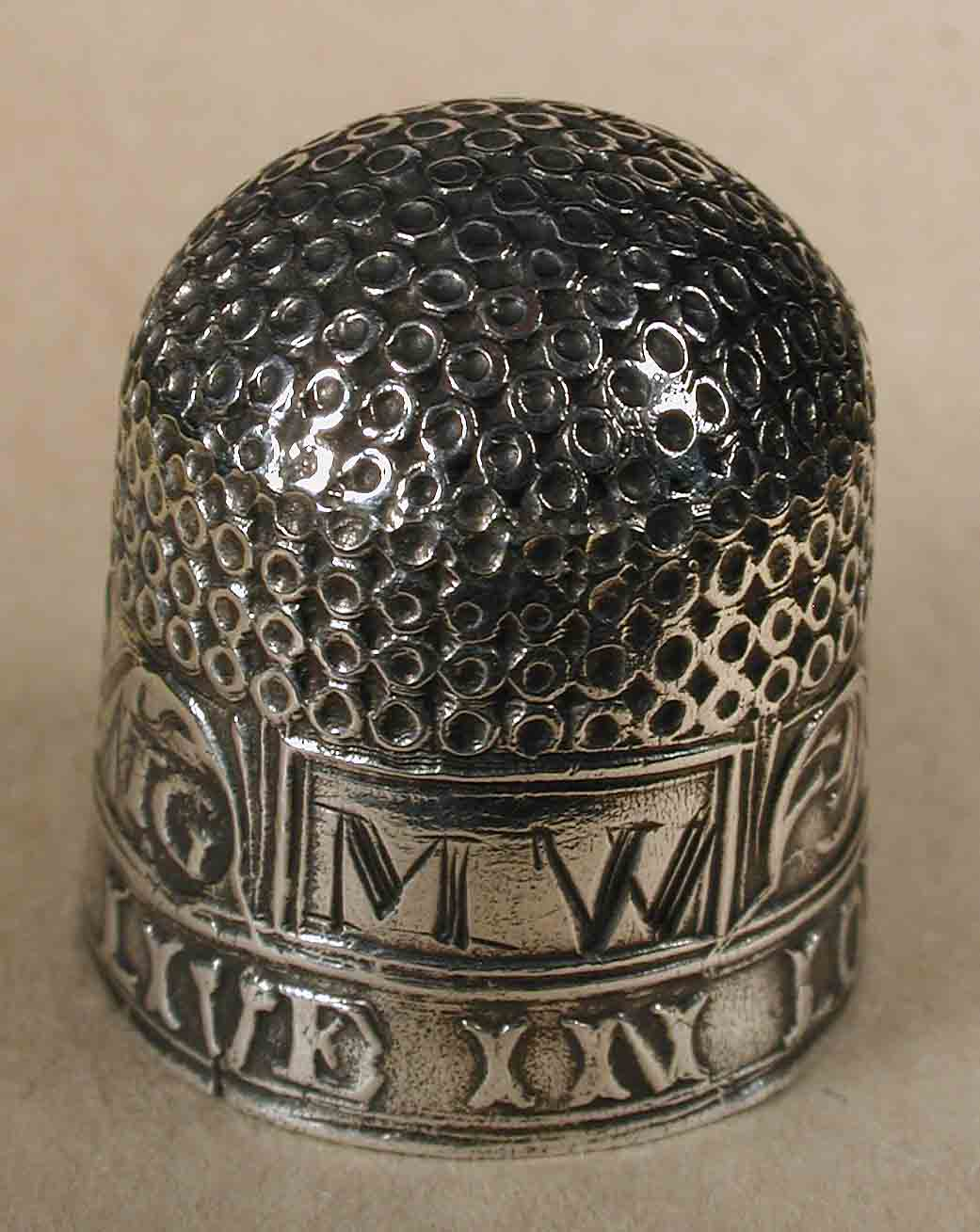
17th century English silver

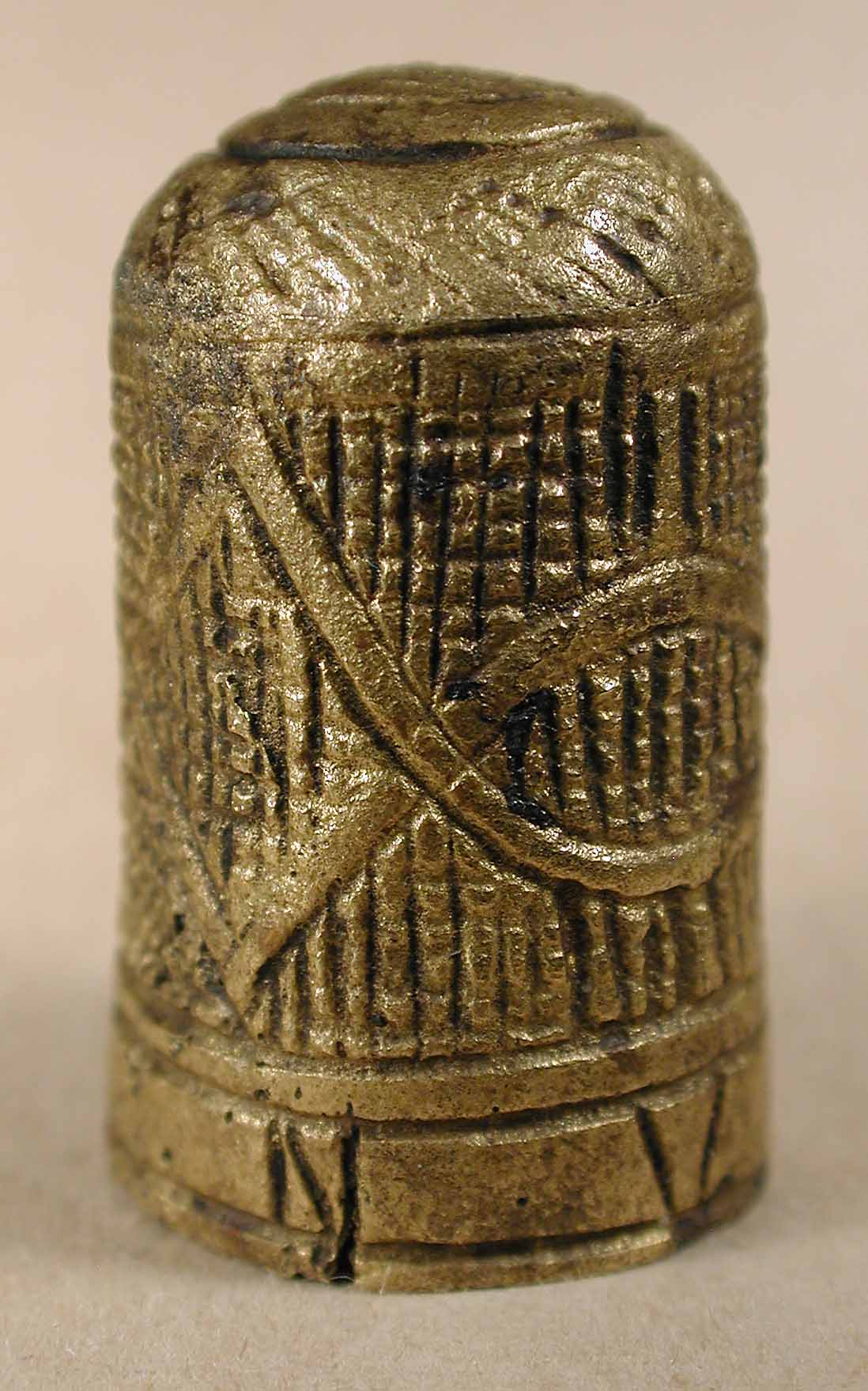
17th century Jacobean brass

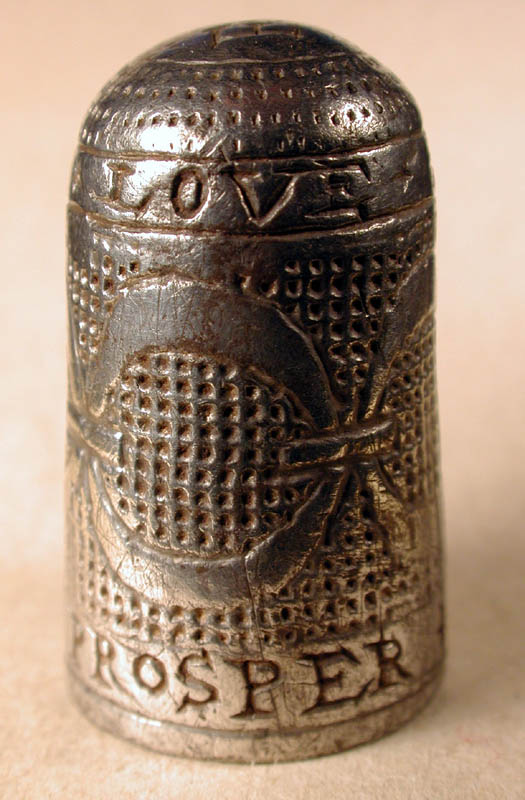
17th century Jacobean silver

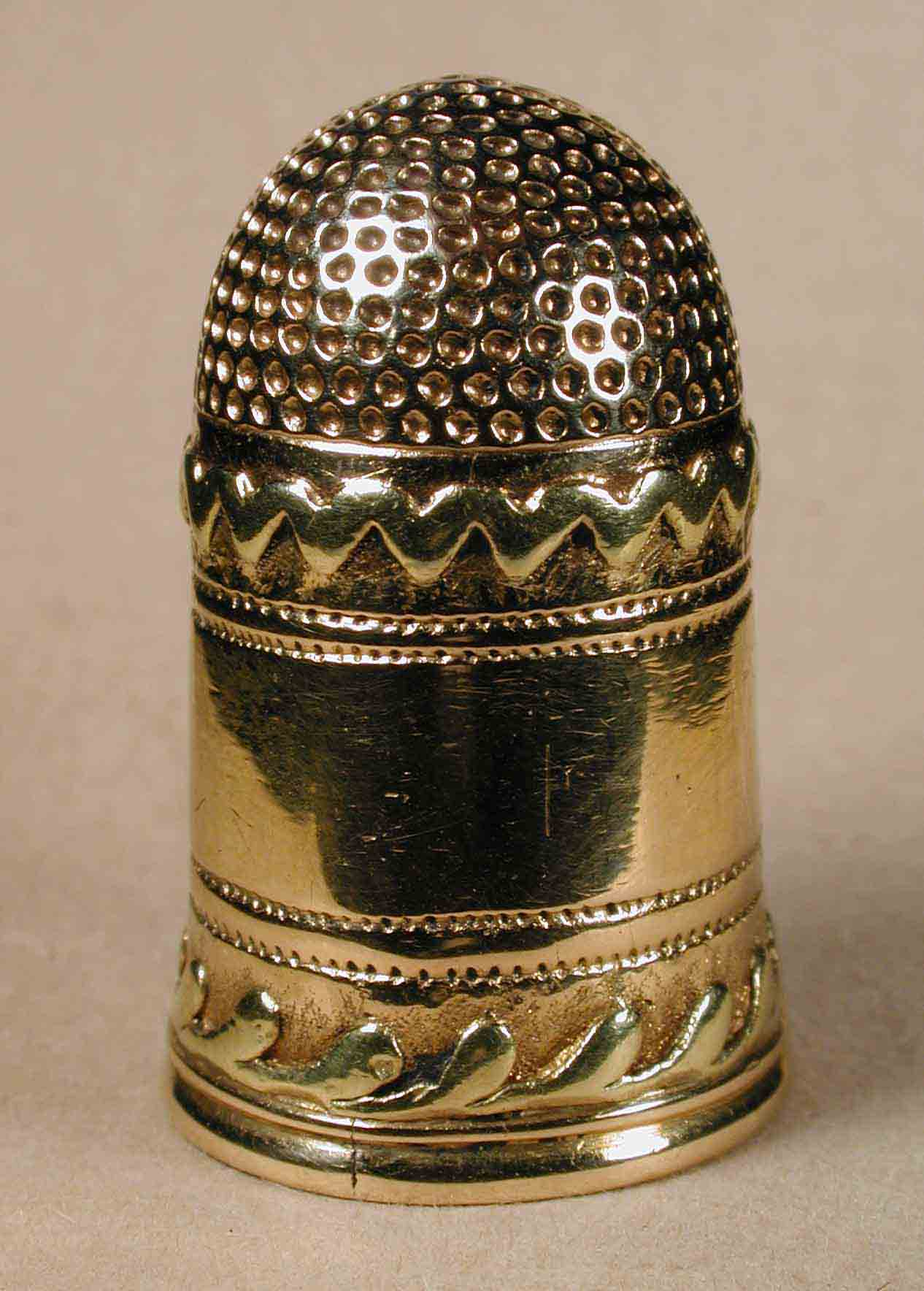
18th century French gold

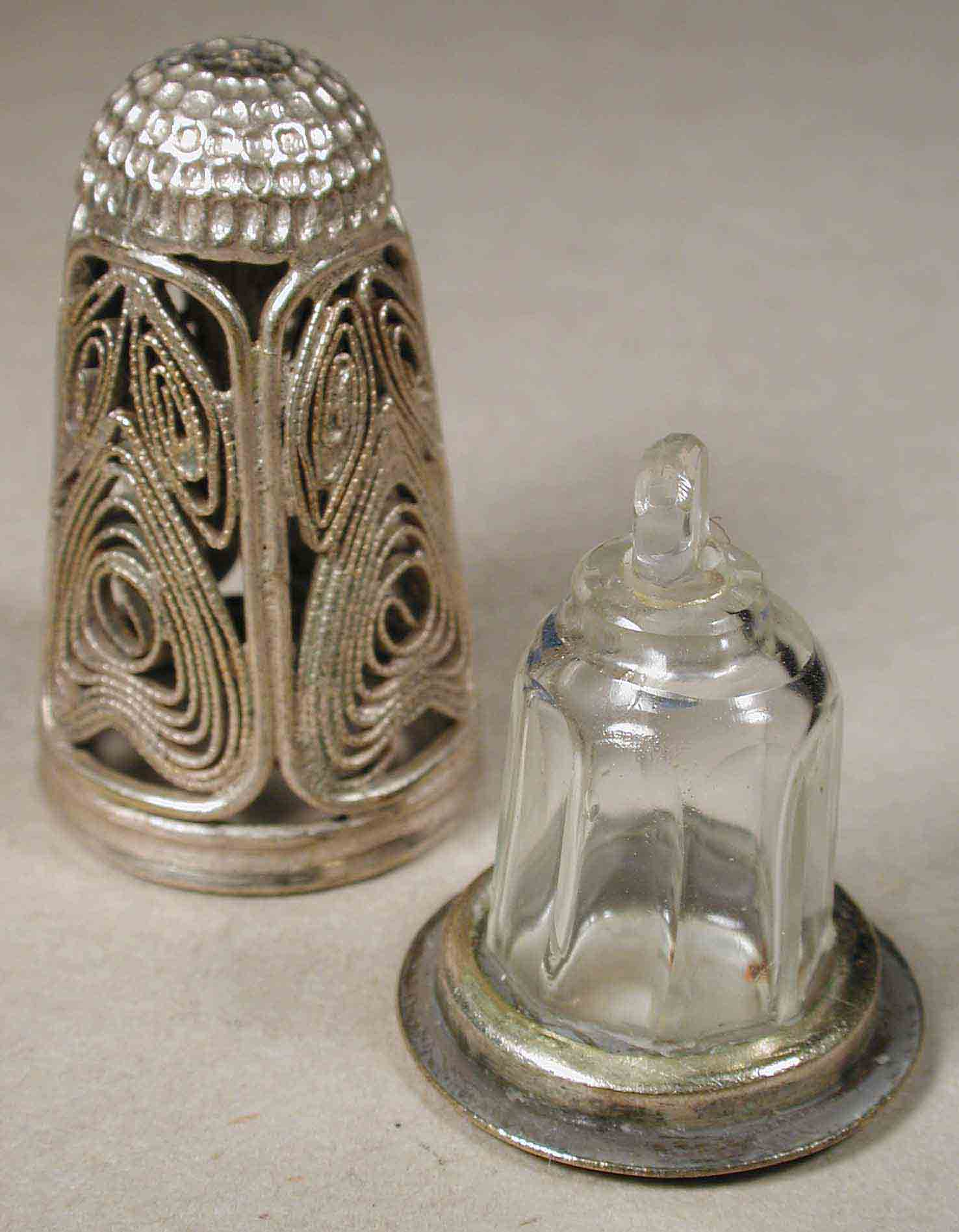
18th century silver filigree with scent bottle

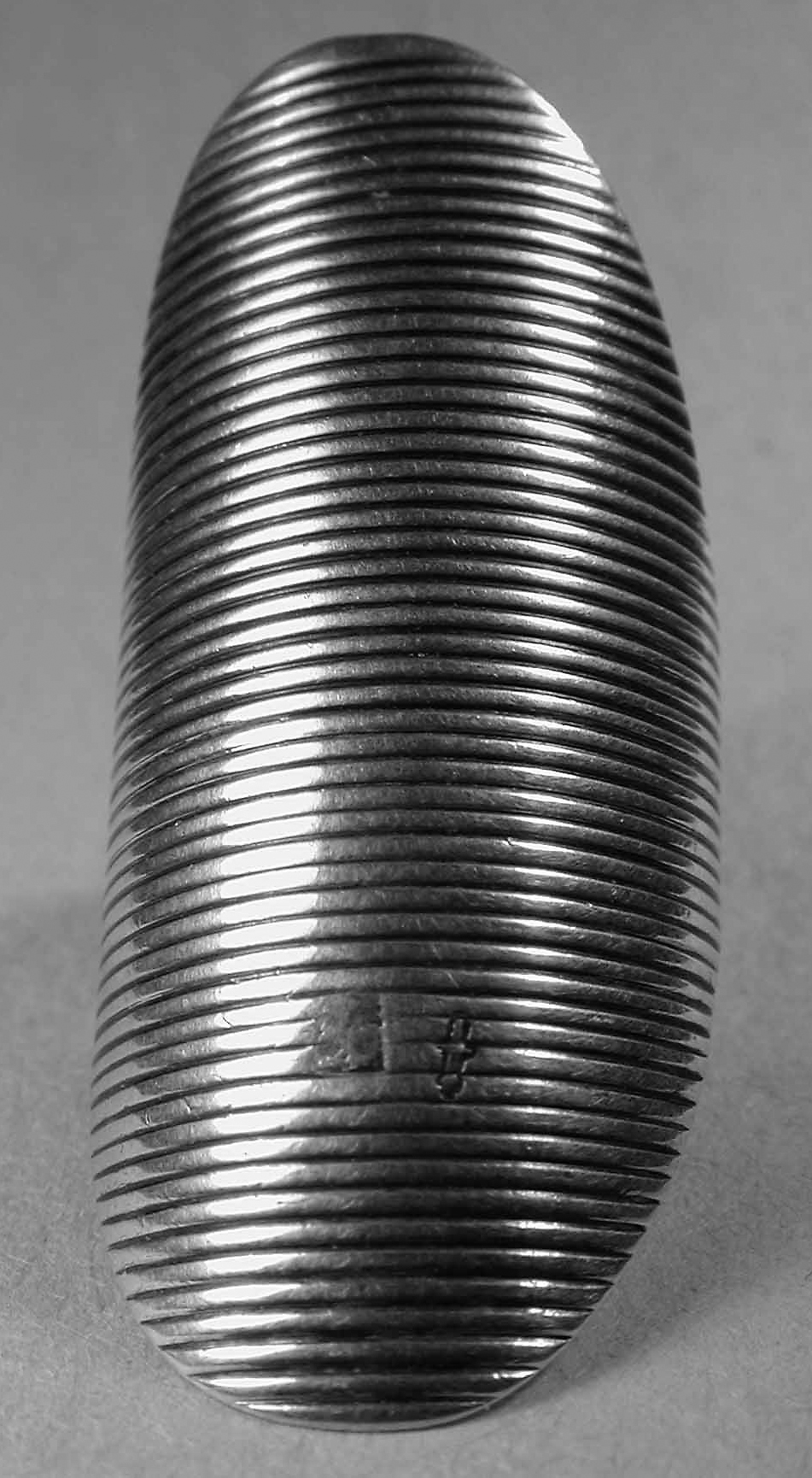
19th century Dutch fingerguard

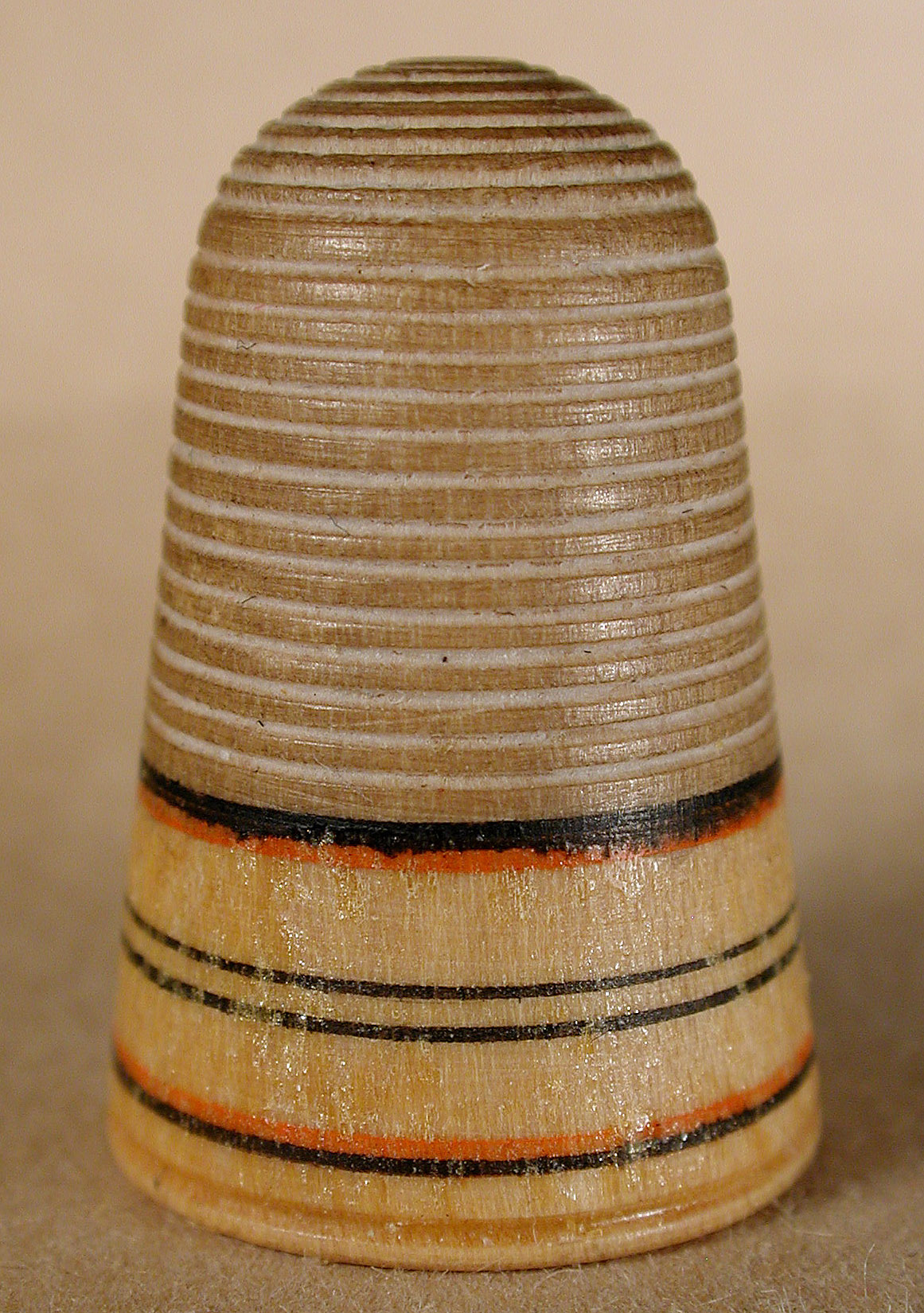
19th century English Tunbridge (wood)

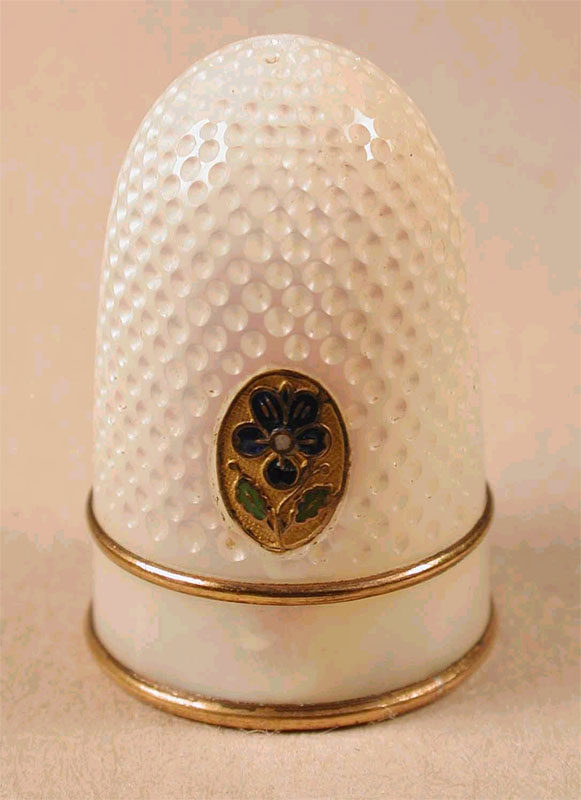
19th century French mother of pearl – Palais Royal

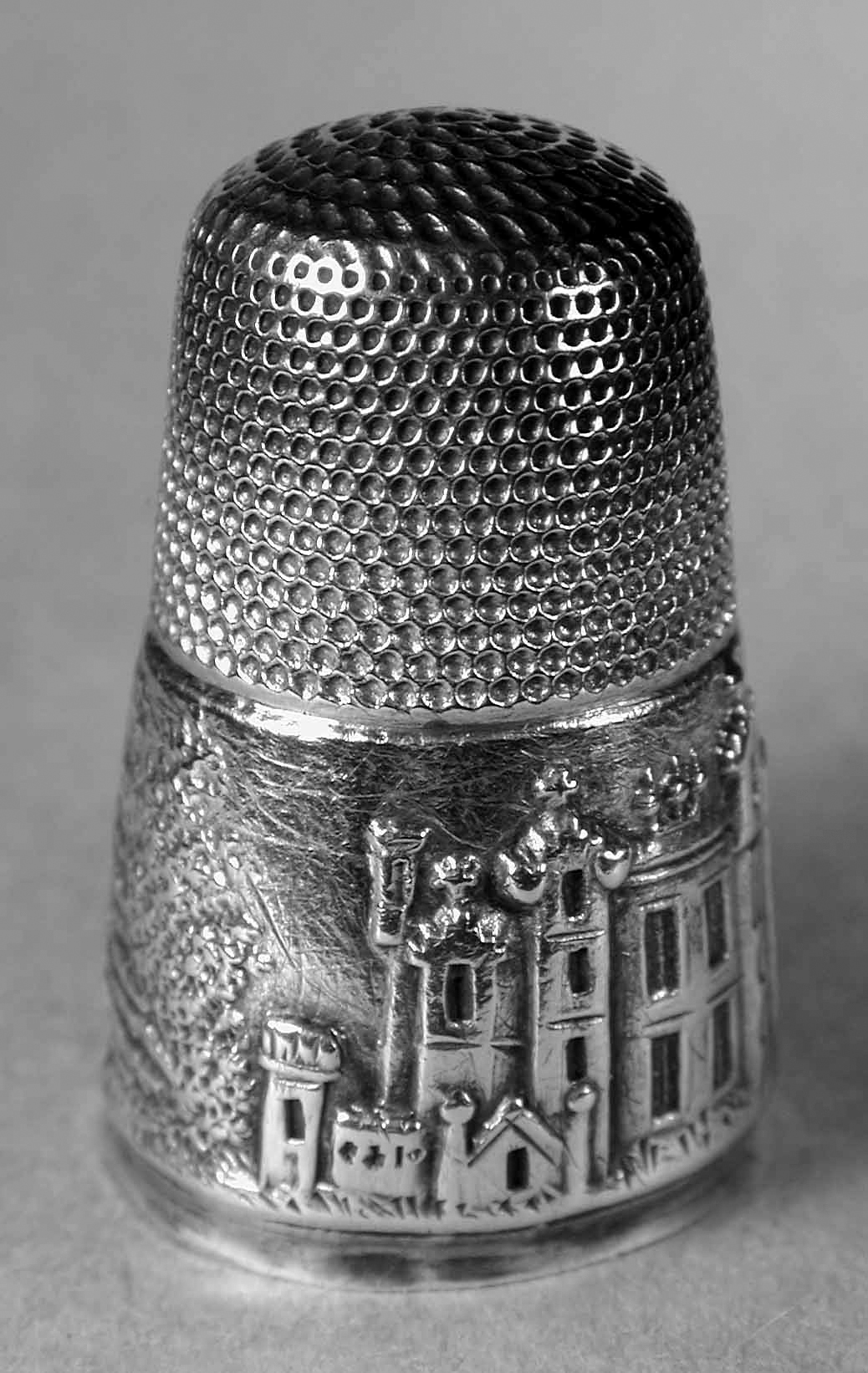
20th century English souvenir – Abbotsford House

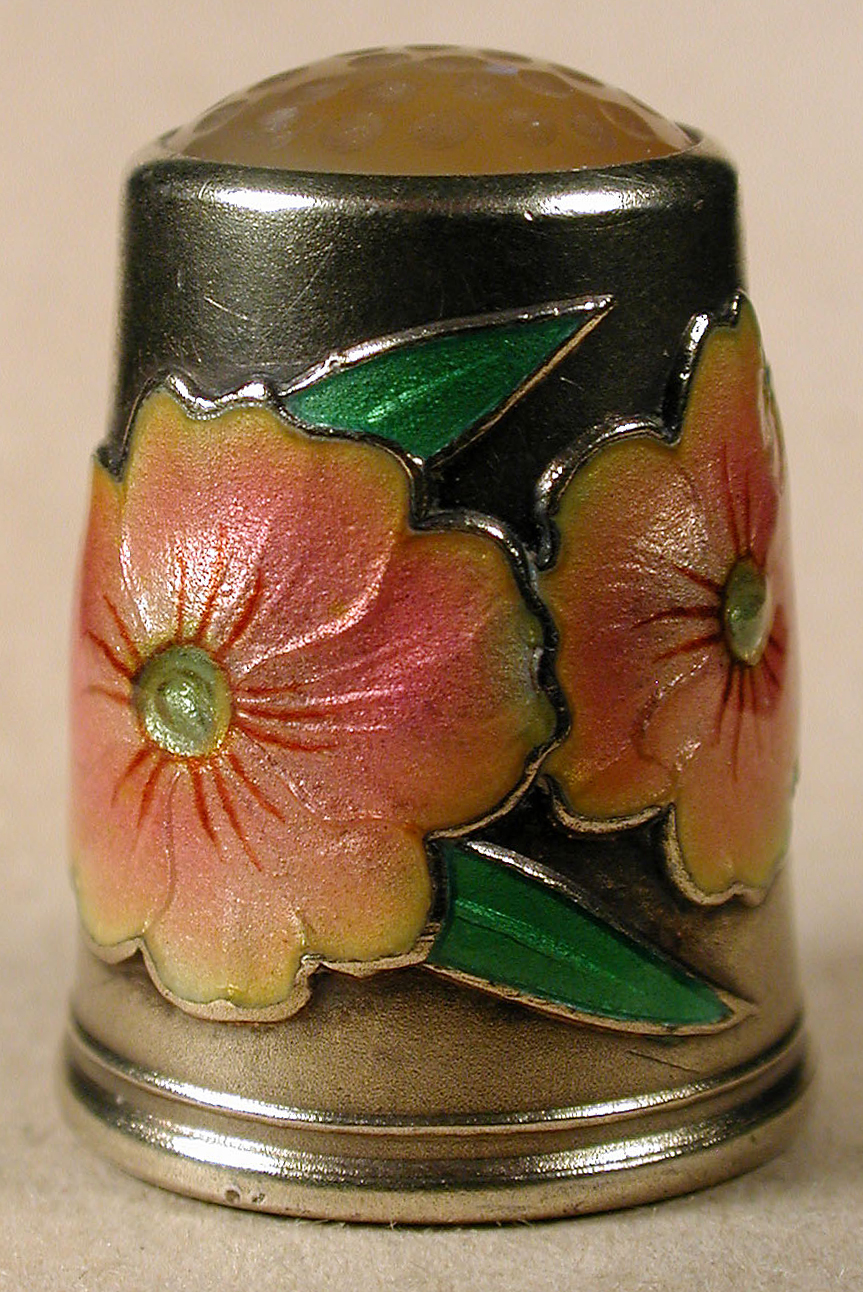
20th century Norwegian enamel (basse-taille) – David Anderson

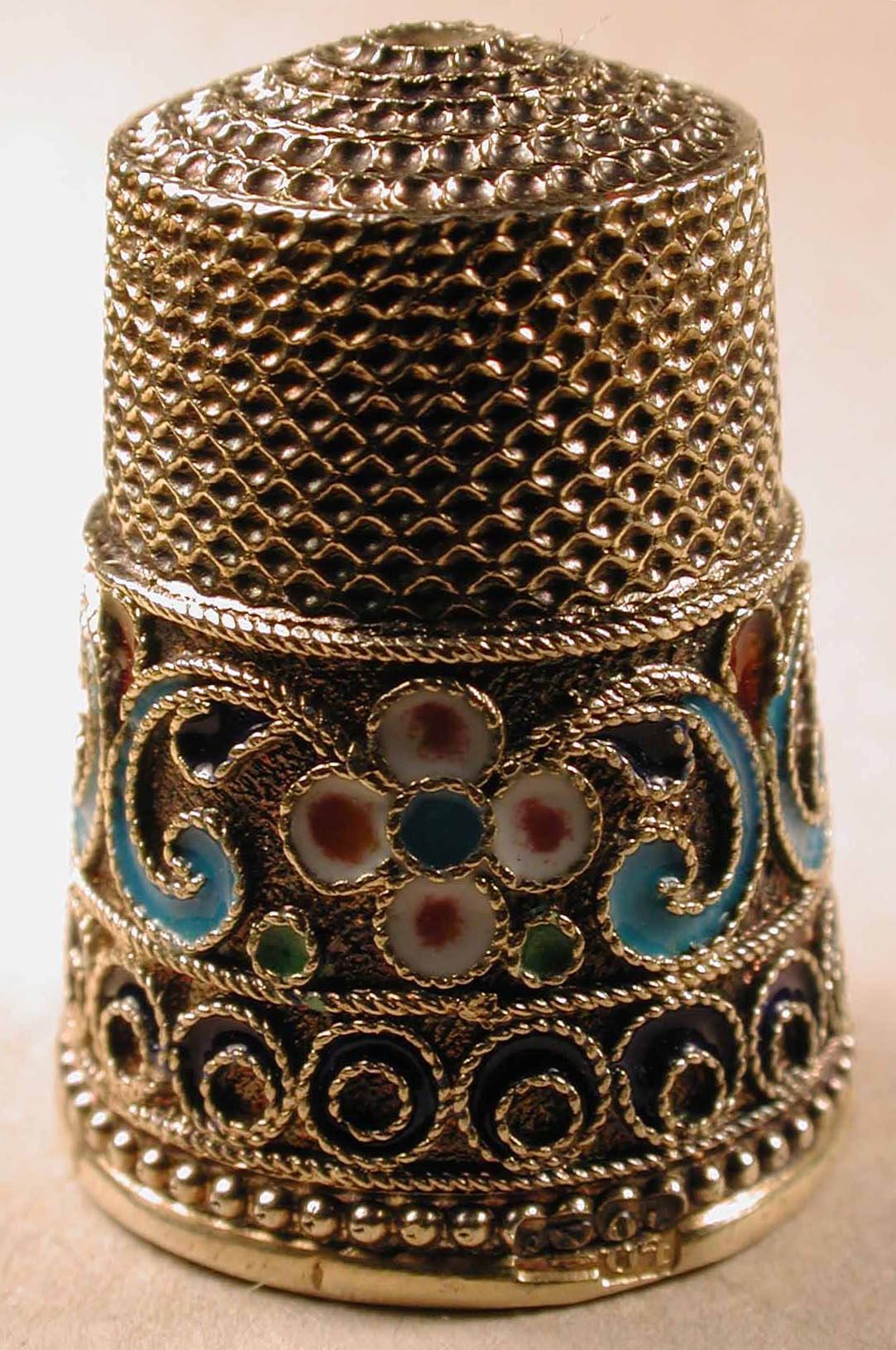
Pre-revolution Russian silver gilt filigree

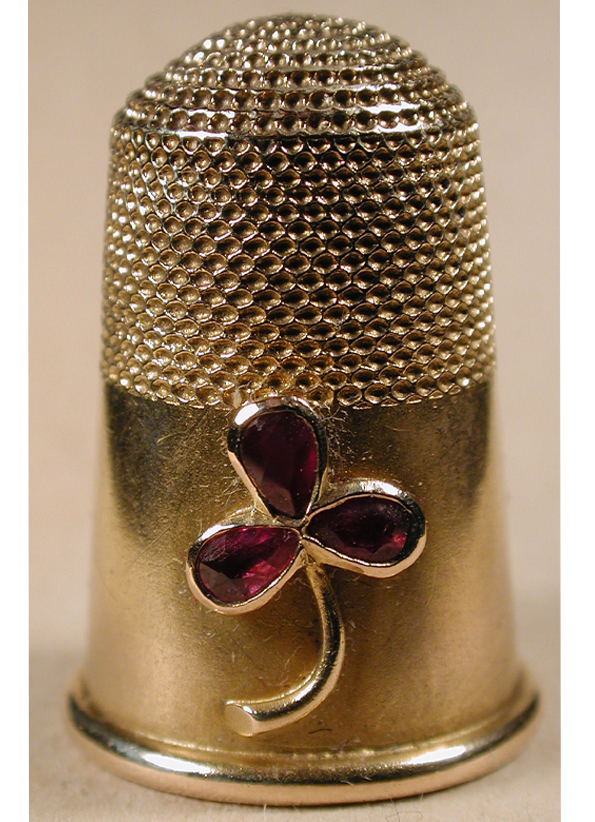
Pre-revolution Russian gold

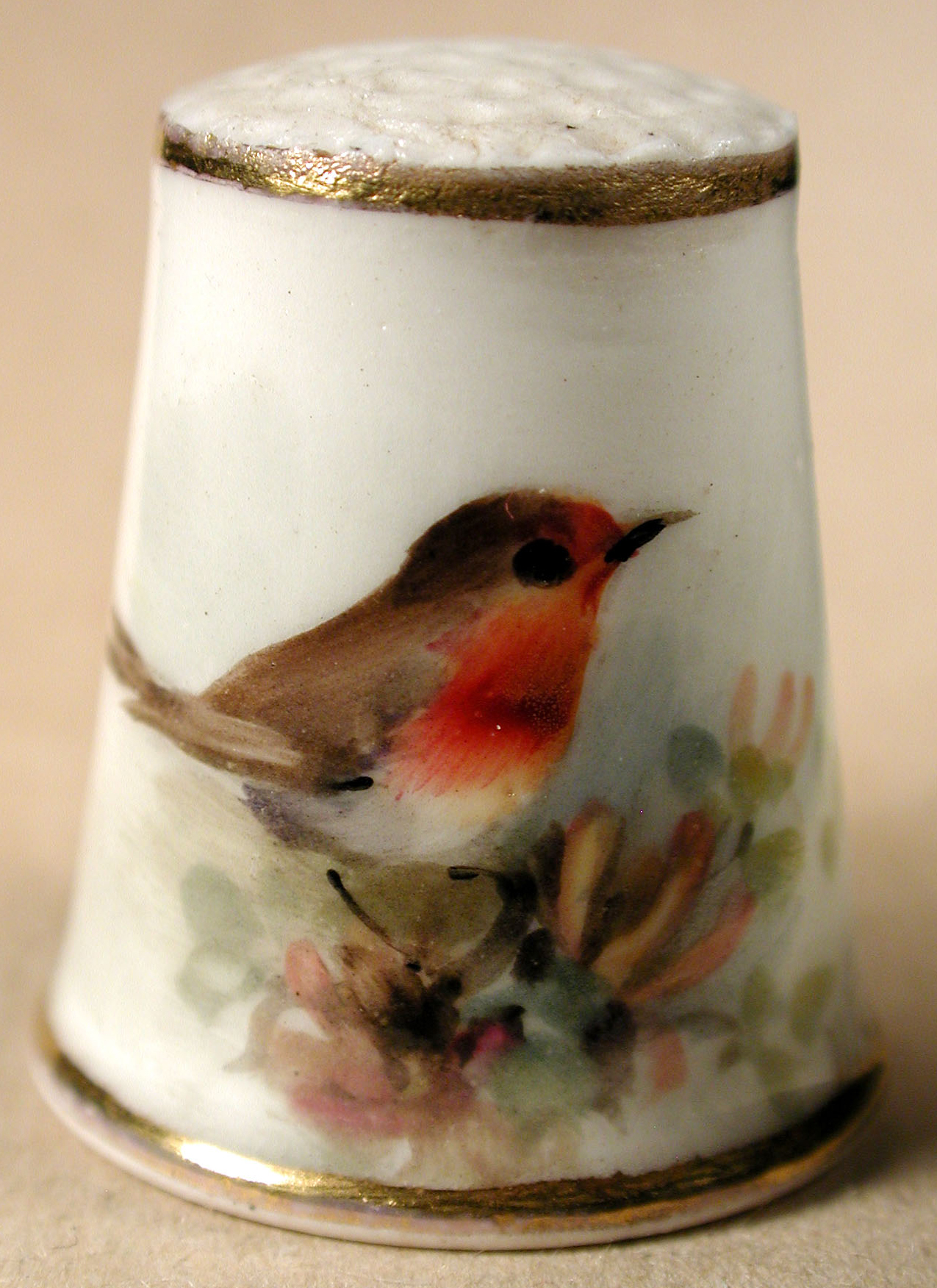
20th century Royal Worcester – William Powell painter

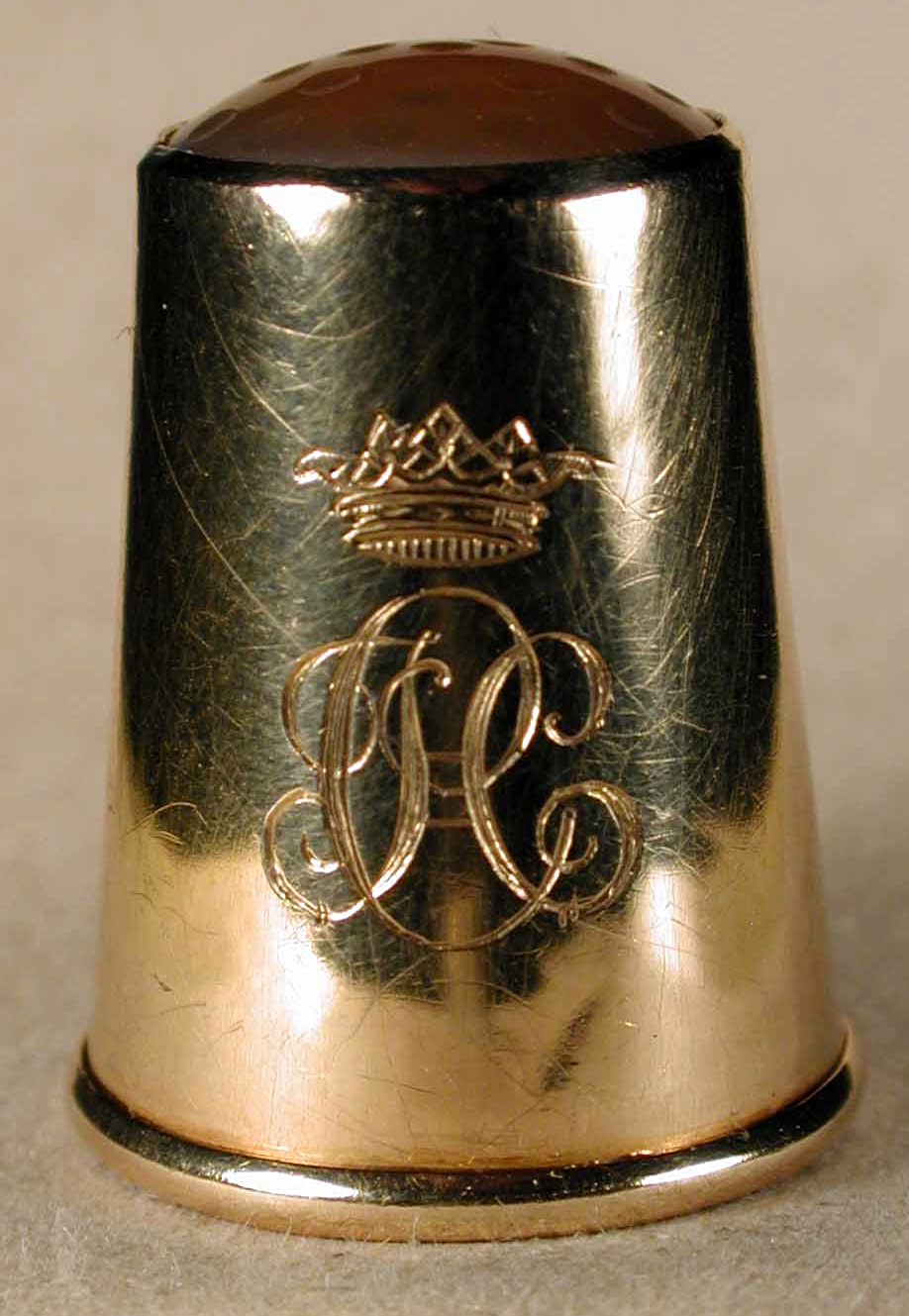
20th century Swedish gold

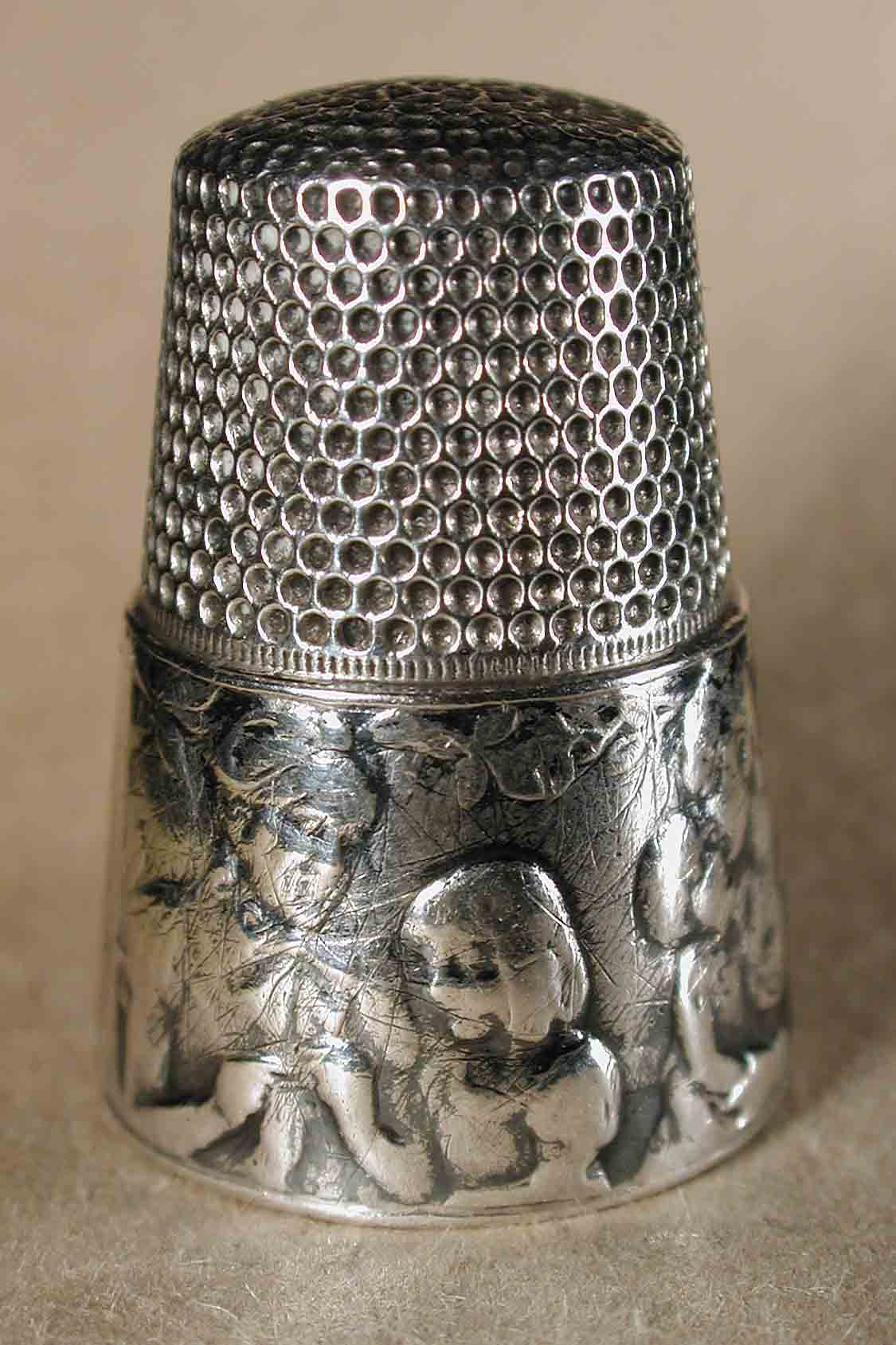
20th century French silver – F Vernon 'Sewing girls'

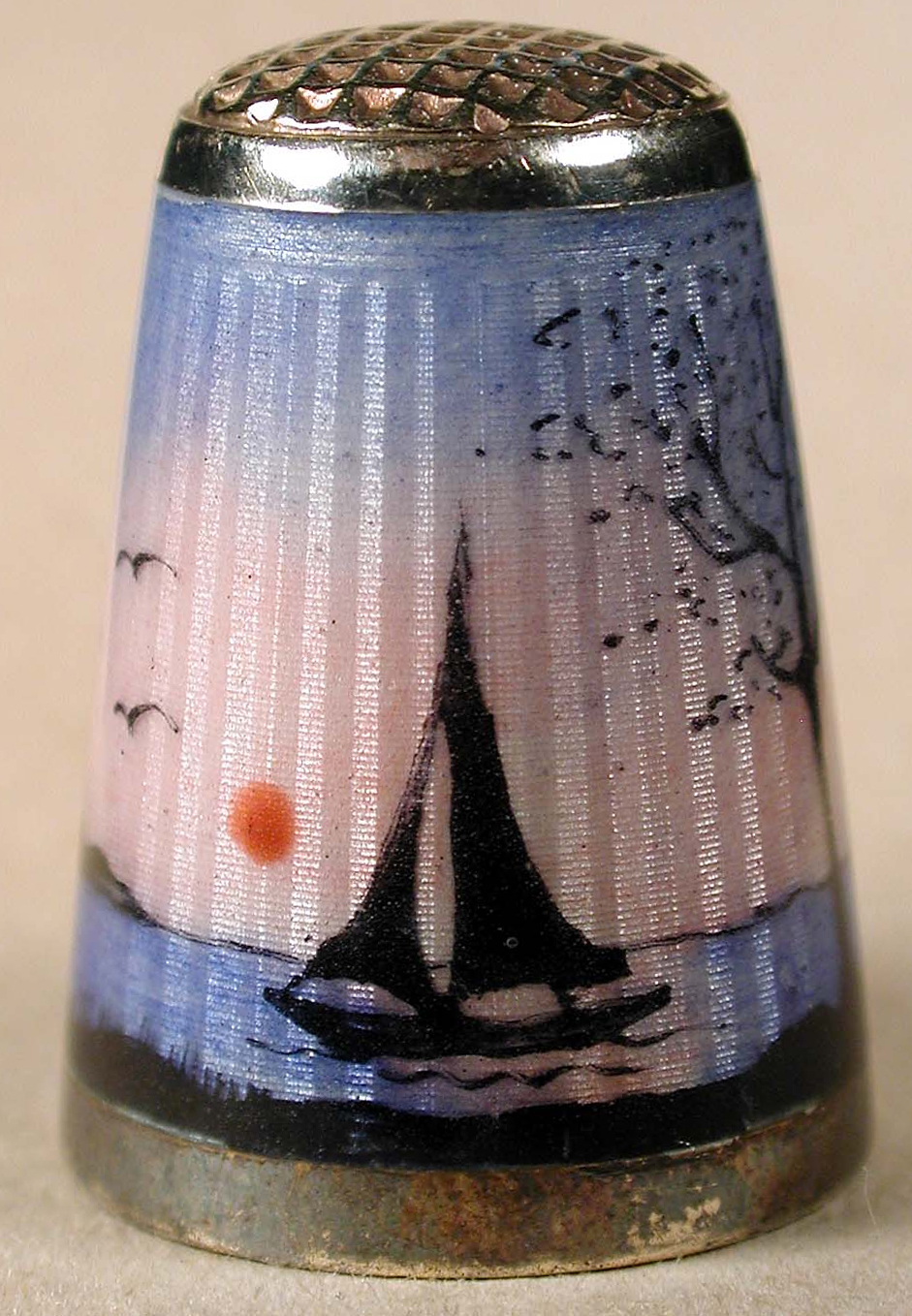
20th century Norwegian enamel (guilloché)
