= Mutti (company) =

Italian food manufacturer

Mutti S.p.A.
- Type: Private (family-owned)
- Industry: Food
- Founded: 1899; 127 years ago in Montechiarugolo, Italy
- Founders: Callisto Mutti and Marcellino Mutti
- Headquarters: Basilicanova, Italy
- Key people: Francesco Mutti (CEO)
- Products: Tomato sauce, tomato pulp, tomato paste, tomato puree, peeled tomato, ketchup
- Revenue: €378 million (2019)
- Number of employees: 234
- Website: mutti-parma.com

Mutti – Industria Conserve Alimentari is an Italian company that specialises in preserved food, particularly in the tomato sector, founded in 1899 in Piazza di Basilicanova, a district in Montechiarugolo, in the Province of Parma.

== History ==
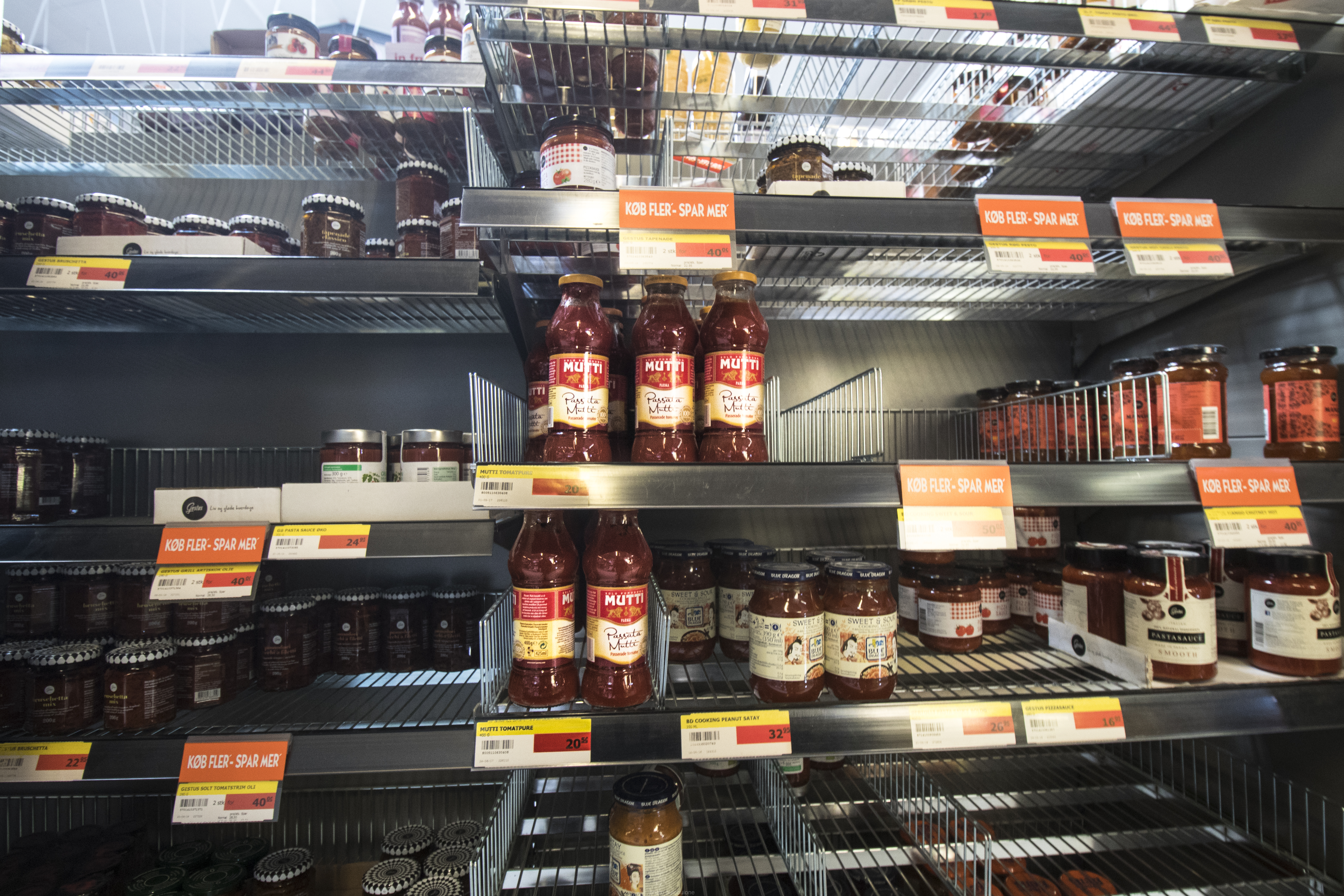
"Mutti" sold in the city of Ilulissat in Greenland

The company was founded by Callisto and Marcellino Mutti (1862–1941) under the name Fratelli Mutti in Piazza di Basilicanova, as a tomato preservation business.

In 1911, the "two lions" trademark was registered and the company obtained its first award with the First-Class Gold Medal certificate at the International Industry and Agriculture Exhibition in Rome. In 1914, Mutti obtained the Grand Cross certificate and was enrolled in the Gran Libro d'Oro dei Benemeriti del lavoro.

During this period, the historic factory in Piazza was connected to the Parma-Traversetolo/Montecchio tramway.

As preservation techniques evolved, in 1922 Mutti began to produce double-concentrated paste and the business continued to develop in 1927 with a number of acquisitions of other preservation companies.

In 1951, the tube for tomato paste was developed by Ugo Mutti (Marcellino's son). The product in this tube does not deteriorate because it does not come into contact with the air, allowing users to consume only what they need. Additionally, housewives could also use the cap as a practical thimble for sewing. It was launched as: the "thimble tube".

In 1971, Mutti's very fine pulp was created, a recipe that remains secret to this day.

Founded as a family business, the company soon became a de facto company, then a limited partnership and finally a joint-stock company in 1979.

In 1994, Francesco Mutti was appointed CEO.

In 1999, the Mutti factory became the first to have all its products certified with integrated pest management and non-GMO. A year later, the "Pomodorino d'Oro" award was created, with which Mutti rewards its producers: a recognition for farmers capable of producing high-quality tomatoes.

In 2004, tomato vinegar was produced for the first time, followed by ready sauces in 2007.

In 2010, the company began to collaborate with WWF in order to research and implement more sustainable production, in particular in reducing CO_{2} emissions and water footprint throughout the supply chain.

Together with Piacenza University's Faculty of Agriculture and the Lims Laboratory in Verbania, in 2012 Mutti developed a methodology to identify the geographical origin of raw materials, starting from an analysis of semi-finished products. The project was presented before the Senate of the Italian Republic on the theme "Nutrition and transparency from the table to the Earth".

In 2013, Mutti France was opened to develop the French market. In the same year, the company began to collaborate with Fiordagosto, a factory based in Oliveto Citra (Salerno), for the production of typical Southern specialties, which it then acquired in 2016.

In 2014, in collaboration with Horta, a spin-off of Università Cattolica of Piacenza, pomodoro.net was created to promote assistance, support and cooperation with farmers.

In 2015, the "Salse Pronte" (ready-made sauces) were launched.

In November 2017, the company acquired Copador, the consortium that operates in the tomato-processing sector in Collecchio, at an auction held by the court of Parma.

== Caporalato ==
In 2017, an investigation revealed that at least one of Mutti's produce suppliers in Nardò, Italy, was allegedly using forced labour (also known as caporalato) to pick tomatoes. The company's CEO, Francesco Mutti, responded by stating that they were working on fully automating the harvesting of their tomatoes, and that they pay above the national framework price for tomatoes. Mutti also argued that the issue was the lack of police intervention in the situation.

== See also ==
- List of Italian companies
