= Paper cut =

Skin wound caused by a thin edge, most often paper

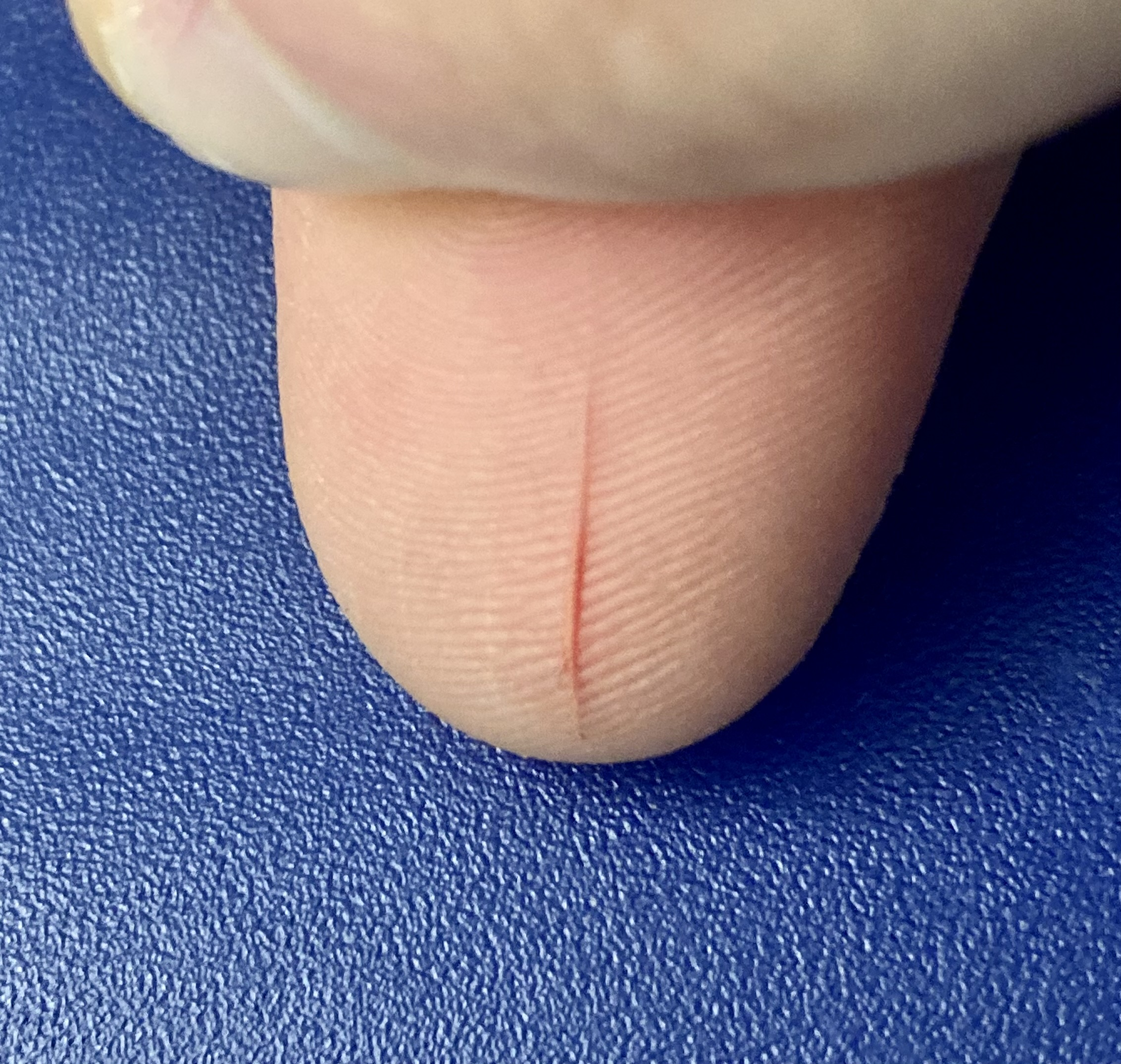
An open paper cut on the thumb

A paper cut occurs when a piece of paper or other thin, sharp material slices a person's skin, often on the upper part of the index finger. Similar injuries caused by things other than paper may also be referred to as "paper cuts". Paper cuts can be highly painful, even though they may bleed little, if at all.

Although a loose sheet of paper is usually too soft to cut the skin, it can be very thin (sometimes as thin as a razor's edge), and can thus exert enough pressure to cause a cut. Paper cuts are most often caused by paper sheets that are fastened together—such as a sheet of paper out of a ream—because a single sheet might be dislocated from the rest. In this case, all the other sheets hold the dislocated sheet in position, making it stiff enough to act as a razor.

Paper cuts can be painful relative to their size, as they can stimulate a large number of skin pain receptors in a small area of the skin. Because the cut typically does not bleed much, the pain receptors are left exposed to the air, causing continued pain. This can be exacerbated by irritation from fibers from the paper itself left behind in the wound, which may be coated in chemicals such as bleach. Additionally, most paper cuts occur in the fingers and hands, which have a high concentration of sensory receptors.
