= Soe, Timor =

Soe
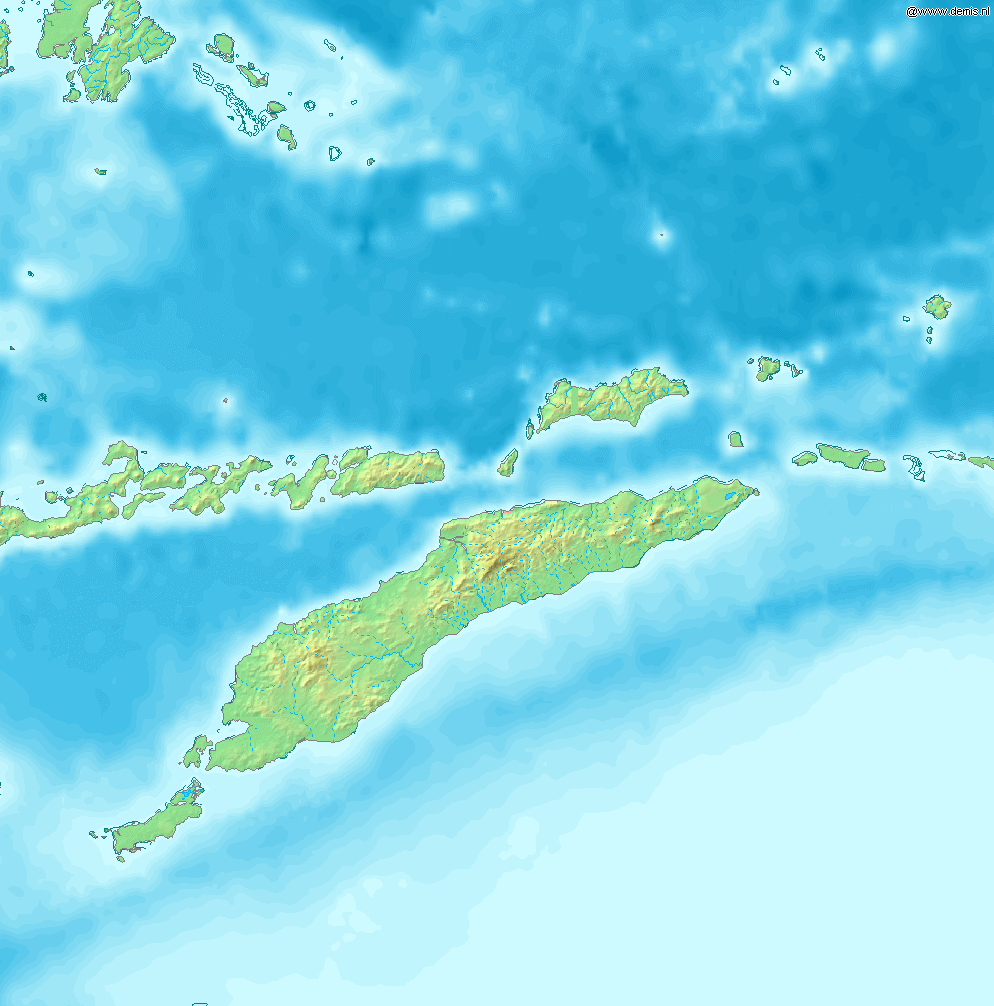
- Location in Indonesia Soe (Indonesia)
- Country: Indonesia
- Region: Lesser Sunda Islands
- Province: East Nusa Tenggara
- Territory: West Timor
- Regency: South Central Timor

Area
  - Total: 10.84 sq mi (28.08 km^{2})
- Elevation: 2,600 ft (800 m)

Population (mid 2025 estimate)
  - Total: 42,657
  - Density: 3,935/sq mi (1,519/km^{2})
- Time zone: UTC+8 (CIT)

Soe (sometimes seen as SoE) is a town which serves as the administrative capital of the South Central Timor Regency, in East Nusa Tenggara province of Indonesia. Soe is located in the south of Timor Island and is bordered by two other districts of the regency, Mollo Selatan on the north side and Amanuban Barat on the south side.

It was heavily bombed in 1944 during the second world war

Water supplies for the locality have been a problem for a considerable time, despite aid to assist with dams and other means of finding water

The town had a population of 40,190 at the 2020 Census, the official estimate as at mid 2025 was 42,657.

Soe can be a base for tourists for trips to other locations. Oinlasi, Boti, Niki Niki and Kapan are reachable from Soe.

It is on the route (via Kapan) to the highest mountain in West Timor Mount Mutis.

== Villages ==
Soe Town is sub-divided administratively into eleven urban subdistricts (kelurahan) and two rural villages (desa), listed below with their populations as of 2024.

- Kuatae (desa) (1,485)
- Noemato (desa) (2,011)
- Cendana (3,750)
- Soe (village) (3,728)
- Oebesa (3,030)
- Kobekamusa (1,716)
- Nunumeu (5,685)
- Oekefan (3,787)
- Taubneno (2,702)
- Kampung Baru (1,406)
- Karang Siri (5,172)
- Nonohonis (5,676)
- Kota Baru (1,874)

Note that Kobekamusa kelurahan is an exclaved part of Soe town, situated to the east of the town and fully surrounded by Amanuban Barat District.
