= Timor =

Island in Indonesia and Timor-Leste

Native name: Illa Timór (Tetun); Pulau Timor (Indonesian); Ilha de Timor (Portuguese)
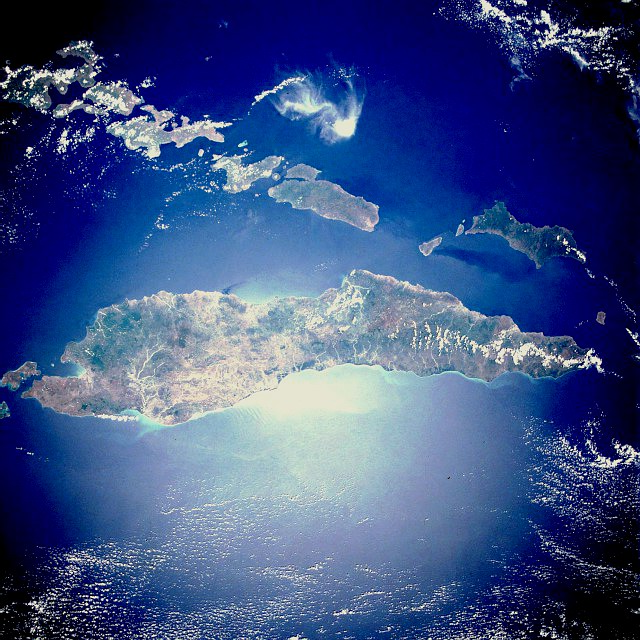
- Timor as seen from space in 1989

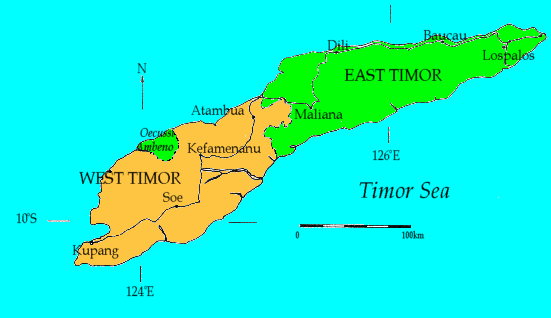
- Political division of Timor between Indonesia and Timor-Leste

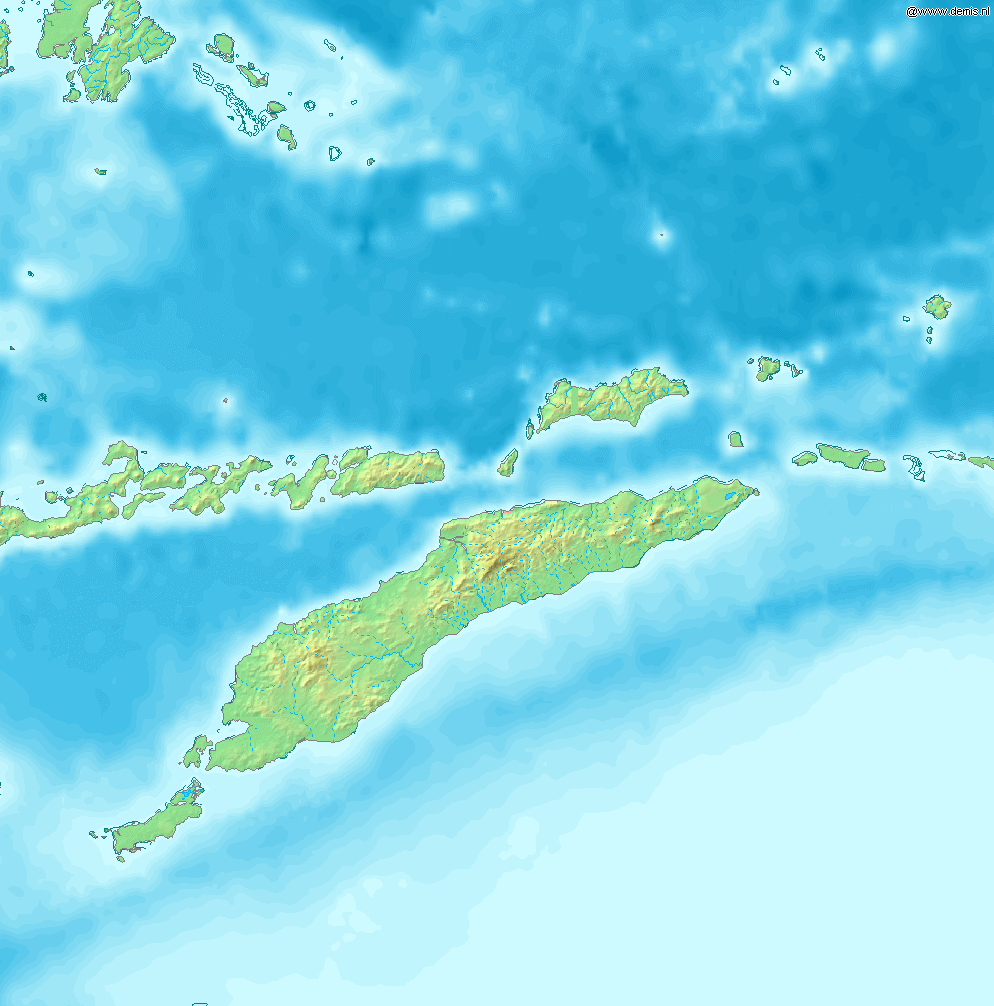
- Location of Timor Timor (Indonesia)

Geography
- Location: Southeast Asia
- Coordinates: 9°14′S 124°56′E
- Area: 30,777 km^{2} (11,883 sq mi)
- Area rank: 44th
- Highest elevation: 2,963 m (9,720 ft)
- Highest point: Ramelau
- Indonesia
- Province: East Nusa Tenggara
- Largest settlement: Kupang (pop. 474,801 as of 2024)
- Timor-Leste
- Largest settlement: Dili (pop. 277,488 as of 2023)

Demographics
- Population: 3,311,735 (2020)
- Population rank: 32nd
- Pop. density: 107.6/km^{2} (278.7/sq mi)
- Languages: Tetun; Uab Meto; Indonesian; East Timorese Portuguese; Helong; Many Timoric languages
- Ethnic groups: Tetun; Mambai; Atoni; Bunak; Kemak; Chinese; Luso-Timorese

Additional information
- Time zones: Central Indonesia Time (West Timor) (UTC+8); Timor-Leste Time (UTC+9)

Timor (Indonesian: Pulau Timor; Portuguese: Ilha de Timor; Tetun: Illa Timór) is an island at the southern end of Maritime Southeast Asia, in the north of the Timor Sea. The name is a variant of timur, Malay for "east"; it is so called because it lies at the eastern end of the Lesser Sunda Islands. Mainland Australia is less than 500 km away, separated by the Timor Sea. The island covers an area of 30,777 square kilometres (11,883 square miles).

With a population of over 3 million people, the island is divided between the sovereign states of Timor-Leste in the eastern part and Indonesia in the western part. The Indonesian part, known as West Timor, is inhabited by around 2 million people and constitutes part of the province of East Nusa Tenggara. Timor-Leste, previously under Indonesian occupation from 1975 to 1999, has a population of around 1.3 million. Within West Timor lies an exclave of Timor-Leste called Oecusse District. The island had previously been divided between the Dutch and Portuguese colonial empires.

== History ==
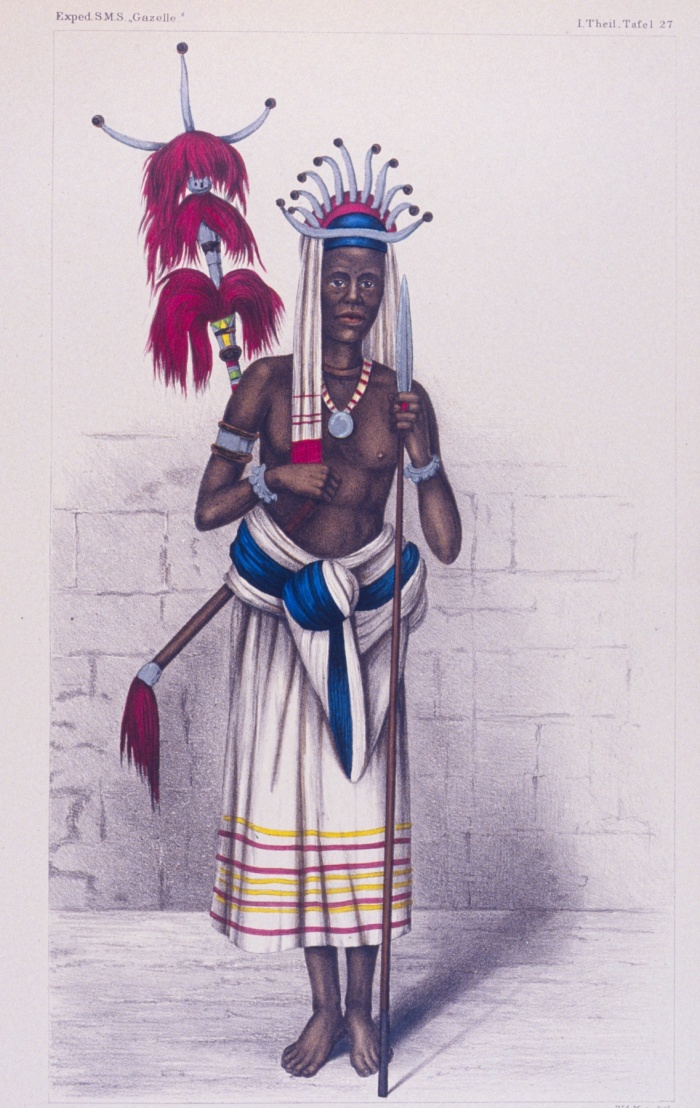
Portrait of a Timorese warrior in the area of Kupang in 1875, from the report of the expedition of the German ship SMS Gazelle

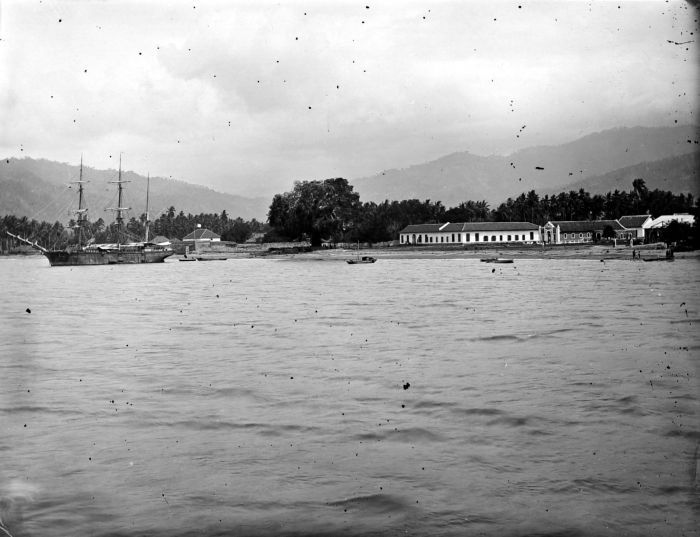
Boats along the Timor coast

The earliest historical record about Timor island is the 13th-century Chinese Zhu Fan Zhi, where it is called Ti-wu and is noted for its sandalwood. In the 14th-century, Javanese Nagarakretagama, Canto 14, Timur is identified as an island within Majapahit's realm. Timor was incorporated into ancient Javanese, Chinese and Indian trading networks of the 14th century as an exporter of aromatic sandalwood, slaves, honey and wax, and was settled by both the Portuguese, in the end of the 16th century, and the Dutch, based in Kupang, in the mid-17th century.

As the nearest island with a European settlement at the time, Timor was the destination of William Bligh and seamen loyal to him following the infamous mutiny on the Bounty in 1789. It was also where survivors of the wrecked HMS Pandora, sent to arrest the Bounty mutineers, landed in 1791 after that ship sank in the Great Barrier Reef.

The island has been politically divided in two parts for centuries. The Dutch and Portuguese fought for control of the island until it was divided by treaty in 1859, but they still did not formally resolve the matter of the boundary until 1912. West Timor, was known as Dutch Timor until 1949 when it became Indonesian Timor, a part of the nation of Indonesia which was formed from the old Netherlands East Indies; while East Timor was known as Portuguese Timor, a Portuguese colony until 1975. It includes the exclave of Oecussi-Ambeno in West Timor.

Although Portugal was neutral during World War II, in December 1941, Portuguese Timor was occupied by Australian and Dutch forces, which were expecting a Japanese invasion. This Australian military intervention dragged Portuguese Timor into the Pacific War but it also slowed the Japanese expansion. When the Japanese did occupy Timor, in February 1942, a 400-strong Dutch-Australian force and large numbers of Timorese volunteers engaged them in a one-year guerrilla campaign. After the allied evacuation in February 1943 the East Timorese continued fighting the Japanese, with comparatively little collaboration with the enemy taking place. This assistance cost the civilian population dearly: Japanese forces burned many villages and seized food supplies. The Japanese occupation resulted in the deaths of between 40,000 and 70,000 Timorese.

Following the 1974 Carnation Revolution, a military coup in Portugal, the Portuguese began to withdraw from Timor. The subsequent internal unrest and fear of the communist Fretilin party led to an invasion by Indonesia, who opposed the concept of an independent East Timor. In 1975, East Timor was annexed by Indonesia and became known as Timor Timur or 'Tim-Tim' for short. It was regarded by Indonesia as the country's 27th province, but this was never recognised by the United Nations (UN) or Portugal.

The people of East Timor, through Falintil the military wing of Fretilin, resisted 35,000 Indonesian troops in a prolonged guerrilla campaign, but the whole island remained under Indonesian control until a referendum held in 1999 under a UN-sponsored agreement between Indonesia and Portugal in which its people rejected the offer of autonomy within Indonesia. The UN then temporarily governed East Timor until it became independent as Timor-Leste in 2002 under the presidency of Falintil leader Xanana Gusmão. Political strife continued, as the new nation coped with poverty. Nevertheless, the UN presence was much reduced.

A group of people on the Indonesian side of Timor have been reported active since 2001 trying to establish a Great Timor state. However, there is no real evidence that the people of West Timor, most of whom are ethnically Atoni, the traditional enemy of the East Timorese, have any interest in such a union. Furthermore, the current government of Timor-Leste recognizes the existing boundary.

== Language, ethnic groups and religion ==
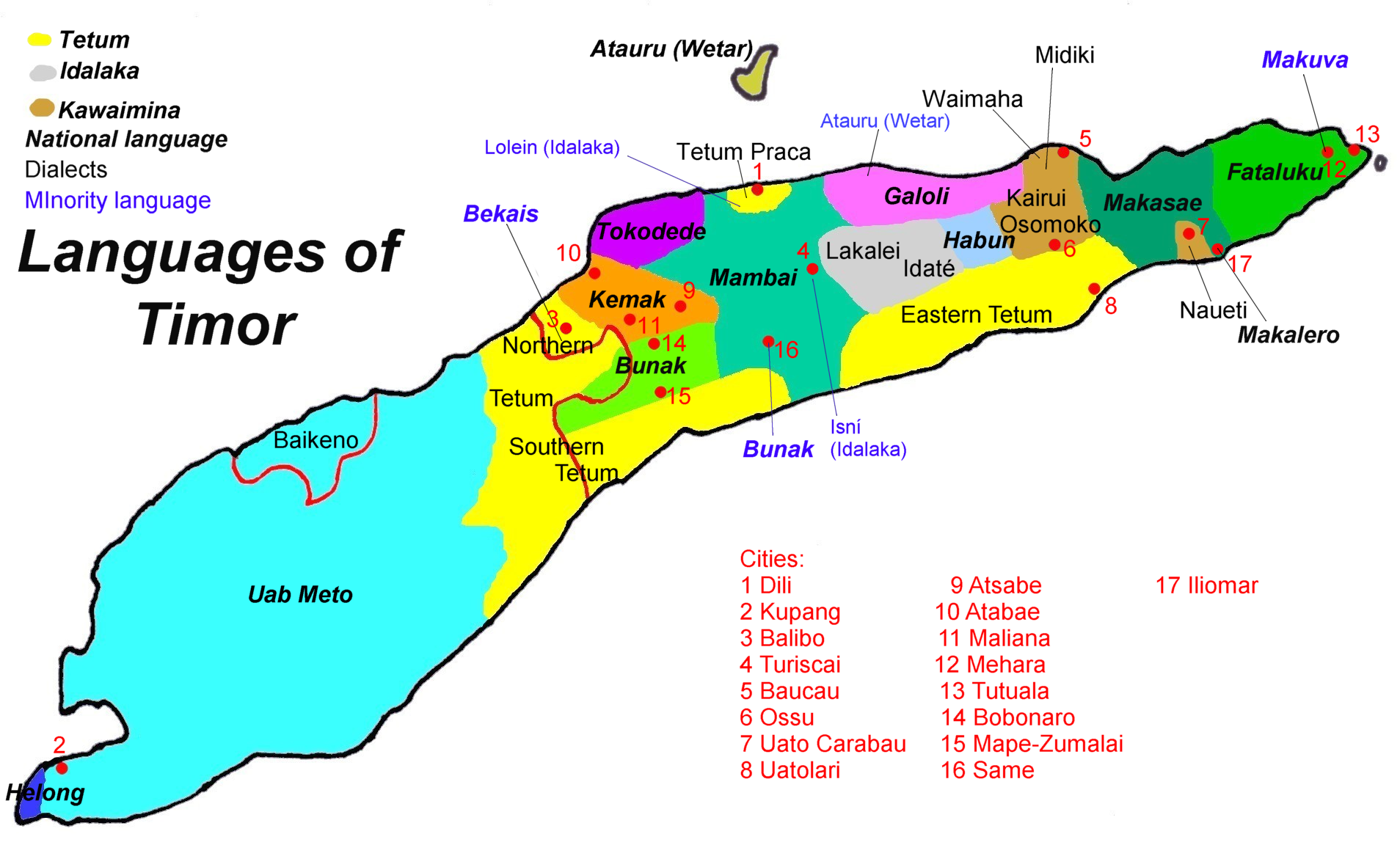
Language map of Timor

Anthropologists identify eleven distinct ethno-linguistic groups in Timor. The largest are the Atoni of western Timor and the Tetun of central and eastern Timor. Most indigenous Timorese languages belong to the Timor–Babar branch of the Austronesian languages spoken throughout the Indonesian archipelago. Although lexical evidence is lacking, the non-Austronesian languages of Timor are thought to be related to languages spoken on Halmahera and in Western New Guinea. Some are so mixed that it is difficult to tell which family they descend from.

The official languages of Timor-Leste are Tetun and Portuguese, while in West Timor it is Indonesian, although Uab Meto (also known as Dawan language) is the local Atoni language spoken throughout Kupang, South Central Timur and North Central Timur Regencies. Indonesian, a standardized dialect of Malay, is also widely spoken and understood in Timor-Leste.

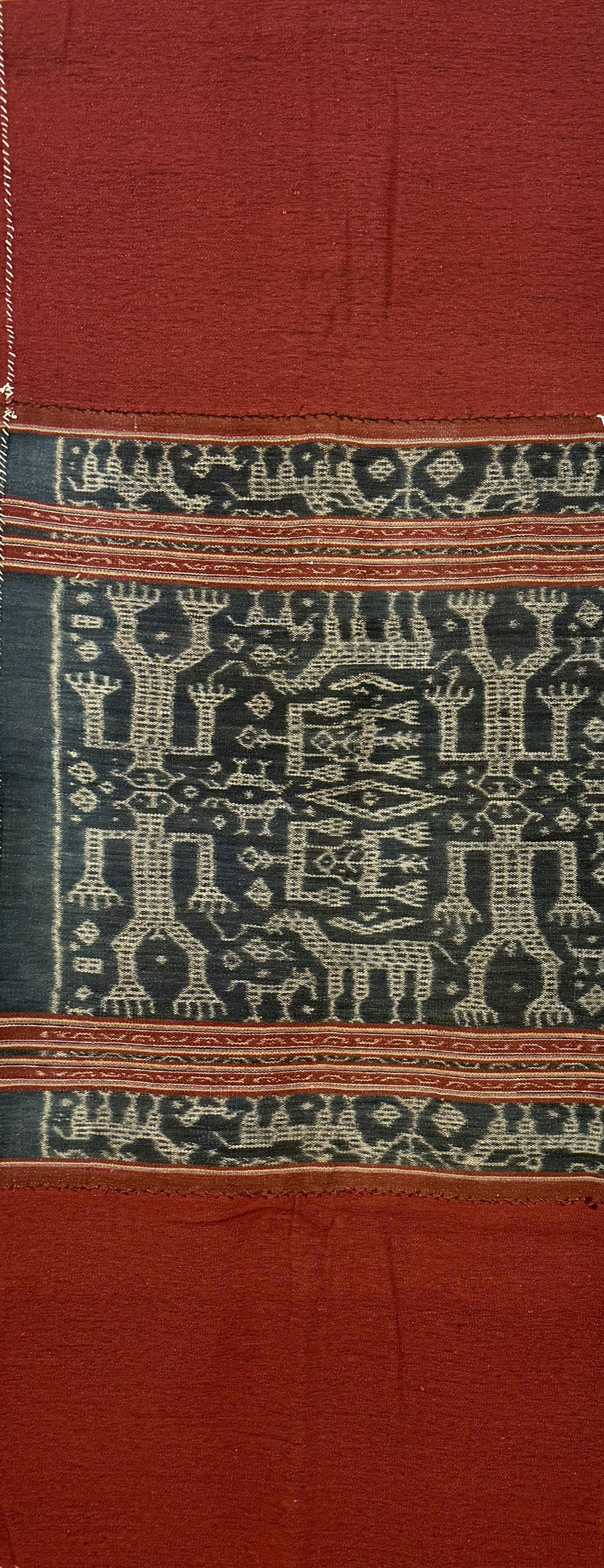

Christianity is the dominant religion throughout the island of Timor, at about 90% of the population. However, it is unequally distributed as West Timor is 58% Protestant and 37% Catholic, and Timor-Leste is 98% Catholic and 1% Protestant. Islam and animism make up most of the remainder at about 5% each across the island.

== Geography ==
Timor is located north of Australia and Oceania, and is one of the easternmost Sunda Islands and the easternmost of Lesser Sunda Islands. Together with Sumba, Babar and associated smaller islands, Timor forms the southern outer archipelago of the Lesser Sunda Islands with the inner islands of Flores, Alor and Wetar to the north, and beyond them Sulawesi.

Timor is the principal island of the Outer Banda Arc, which is being uplifted by arc-continent collision with the Australian continent. Timor consists mostly of rocks from the Australian continental margin that are accreted to the Banda Arc. It occupies a forearc position in front of the active volcanic arc that forms the islands in the Flores region to the north. The orientation of the main axis of the island also differs from its neighbors. These features have been explained as the result of being on the northern edge of the Indo-Australian Plate as it meets the Eurasian Plate and pushes into Southeast Asia. The climate includes a long dry season (April-November) with hot winds blowing over from Australia. Rivers on the island include the North and South Laclo Rivers in Timor-Leste. The mountains, which reach up to nearly 3000m in elevation, are one of the most mature parts of the Banda Range, which stretches from Sumba to Seram. Mutis is the highest mountain in West Timor and Ramelau is the highest mountain in Timor Leste.

The largest towns on the island are the provincial capital of Kupang in West Timor, Indonesia and the Portuguese colonial towns of Dili the capital, and Baucau in Timor-Leste. Poor roads make transport to inland areas difficult, especially in Timor-Leste. Sources of revenue include gas and oil in the Timor Sea, coffee growing and tourism.

== Geology ==
Timor is an aerially exposed portion of the Banda Forearc formed by collision of Eurasian oceanic crust and continental crust of the Australian plate. This is a unique convergent margin where a thick continental margin is forced under thinner oceanic crust. The result is a large accretionary wedge of imbricated thrust sheets composed of Cretaceous and Tertiary distal material of the Australian continental margin thrust on top of Australian continental shelf deposits. Timor is well known for its structural complexity. Debate continues about the nature of deformation of continental crust. Some researchers advocate shallow thin-skinned deformation, while others favor shallow thin-skinned with some basement deformation.

Timor also has potential for significant petroleum development. Onshore and offshore exploration efforts have been attempted with varying success. Timor host dozens of natural oil and gas seeps with most exploration concentrated on the north end of the Island where oil seeps are prevalent. Carbon rich shales from the island have been found with TOC up to 23%. Such shales buried deep in the subsurface could act as high-quality source rocks. Jurassic marine shoreface and turbidite sands of the Plover and Militia Formations are proven reservoirs in the North Australian Shelf. Over pressured Upper Jurassic silt and mudstones shales may also provide adequate seals for hydrocarbons. Research focusing on the structure of deformed basement rocks provides insight into possible onshore and offshore structural and stratigraphic traps for future petroleum development.

== Demographics ==
=== Most populous settlements ===
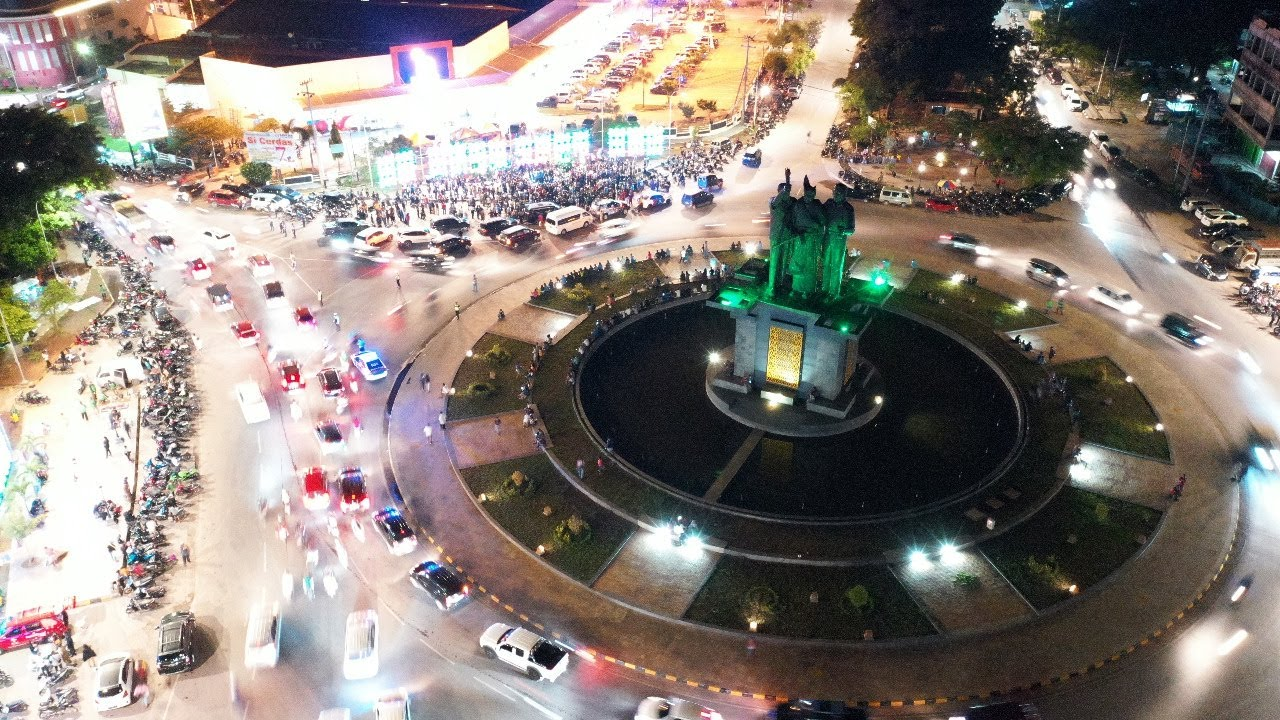
Kupang, the most populous and largest city on the island of Timor

- Provincial/municipality capital
- National capital

Rank	City/Town	Population	Country	Province/municipality
1	Kupang	474,801	Indonesia	East Nusa Tenggara
2	Dili	277,488	Timor-Leste	Dili
3	Atambua	85,838	Indonesia	East Nusa Tenggara
4	Kefamenanu	49,589	Indonesia	East Nusa Tenggara
5	Central Kupang	48,635	Indonesia	East Nusa Tenggara
6	Soe	41,640	Indonesia	East Nusa Tenggara
7	Betun	41,631	Indonesia	East Nusa Tenggara
8	West Malaka	23,639	Indonesia	East Nusa Tenggara
9	Oelamasi	15,013	Indonesia	East Nusa Tenggara
10	Baucau	14,961	Timor-Leste	Baucau Municipality

== Administration ==
=== 2018 and 2023 ===
Name	Capital	Population		HDI		GDP billion US$		Nominal (US$) per capita		PPP (Int$) per capita		Country
Name	Capital	2018	2023	2018	2023	2018	2023	2018	2023	2018	2023	Country
West Timor	Kupang	1,935,245	2,011,273	0.664 (Medium)	0.701 (high)	3.646	3.992	1,884	1,985	6,193	6,357	Indonesia
Timor-Leste	Dili	1,183,643	1,350,664	0.606 (Medium)	0.566 (Medium)	1.531	2.338	1,294	1,731	3,252	4,051	Timor-Leste
Timor	–	3,118,888	3,361,938	0.635 (Medium)	0.647 (Medium)	5.177	6.330	1,589	1,883	4,722	5,431	

=== 2023 ===
Name	Capital	Area km^{2}	Population 2023	HDI 2023	GDP per capita nominal US$	GDP per capita PPP US$	Country
Kupang City	Kupang	160	466,629	0.828 (Very High)	4,004	12,823	Indonesia
Kupang Regency	Oelamasi	5,898	376,842	0.675 (Medium)	1,594	5,106	Indonesia
North Central Timor Regency	Kefamenanu	2,669	271,273	0.666 (Medium)	1,166	3,733	Indonesia
Belu Regency	Atambua	1,284	231,012	0.675 (Medium)	1,557	4,985	Indonesia
South Central Timor Regency	Soe	3,947	474,526	0.654 (Medium)	1,313	4,205	Indonesia
Malaka Regency	Betun	1,160	190,991	0.645 (Medium)	1,176	3,765	Indonesia
Dili	Dili	367	252,884	0.709 (High)			Timor-Leste
Liquiçá	Liquiçá	549	73,027	0.613 (Medium)			Timor-Leste
Manufahi	Same	1,323	52,246	0.598 (Medium)			Timor-Leste
Manatuto	Manatuto	1,782	45,541	0.596 (Medium)			Timor-Leste
Covalima	Suai	1,203	4,550	0.596 (Medium)			Timor-Leste
Aileu	Aileu	737	48,554	0.594 (Medium)			Timor-Leste
Lautém	Lospalos	1,813	64,135	0.586 (Medium)			Timor-Leste
Viqueque	Viqueque	1,877	77,402	0.584 (Medium)			Timor-Leste
Bobonaro	Maliana	1,376	98,932	0.584 (Medium)			Timor-Leste
Baucau	Baucau	1,506	124,061	0.584 (Medium)			Timor-Leste
Ainaro	Ainaro	804	66,397	0.545 (Low)			Timor-Leste
Ermera	Gleno	768	127,283	0.543 (Low)			Timor-Leste
Oecusse (SAR)	Pante Macassar	814	72,230	0.542 (Low)			Timor-Leste
West Timor	Kupang	15,120	2,011,273	0.701 (high)	1,985	6,357	Indonesia
Timor-Leste	Dili	15,007	1,350,664	0.566 (Medium)	1,731	4,051	Timor-Leste
Timor	–	30,777	3,361,938	0.647 (Medium)	1,883	5,431	

=== West Timor ===
West Timor is part of the East Nusa Tenggara province. It was formerly split into the City of Kupang (a kabupaten or regency-level administrative area) and four regencies (kabupaten); from west to east these are: Kupang, Timor Tengah Selatan (South Central Timor), Timor Tengah Utara (North Central Timor) and Belu. However, a fifth regency – Malaka – was in 2012 formed from the southern half of Belu Regency. Note that the administrative area has shrunk as Rote Ndao Regency (Rote and Ndoa islands to the southwest) and Sabu Raijua Regency (the Savu Islands further west) were split off in 2002 and 2009 respectively from Kupang Regency. The island accounts for 35.5% of the provincial population.

=== Timor-Leste ===
Timor-Leste is divided into thirteen municipalities, which in turn are subdivided into 65 administrative posts, 442 sucos (villages), and 2,225 aldeias (hamlets).

== Flora and fauna ==
Timor and its offshore islands such as Atauro, a former place of exile increasingly known for its beaches and coral, as well as Jaco along with Wetar and the other Barat Daya Islands to the northeast constitute the Timor and Wetar deciduous forests ecoregion. The natural vegetation was tropical dry broadleaf forests with an undergrowth of shrubs and grasses supporting a rich wildlife. However much of the original forest has been cleared for farming, especially on the coasts of Timor and on the smaller islands like Atauro. Apart from one large block in the centre of Timor only patches remain. This ecoregion is part of the Wallacea area with a mixture of plants and animals of Asian and Australasian origin; it lies in the western part of Wallacea, in which Asian species predominate.

Many trees are deciduous or partly deciduous, dropping their leaves during the dry season, there are also evergreen and thorn trees in the woodland. Typical trees of the lowland slopes include Sterculia foetida, Calophyllum teysmannii and Aleurites moluccanus.

During the Pleistocene epoch, Timor was the abode of extinct giant monitor lizards similar to the Komodo dragon. Like Flores, Sumba and Sulawesi, Timor was also once a habitat of extinct dwarf stegodonts, relatives of elephants.

Fauna of today includes a number of endemic species such as the distinctive Timor shrew and Timor rat. The northern common cuscus, a marsupial of Australasian origin occurs as well, but is thought to be introduced. The island have a great number of birds, mainly of Asian origin with some of Australasian origin. There is a total of 250 species of which twenty four are endemic, due to the relative isolation of Timor, including five threatened species; the slaty cuckoo-dove, Wetar ground dove, Timor green pigeon, Timor imperial pigeon, and iris lorikeet.

Saltwater crocodiles are found in the wetlands whereas reticulated pythons can be found in forests and grasslands of Timor. However, the population sizes and status are unknown.

Frog species in Timor include Duttaphrynus melanostictus, Hoplobatrachus tigerinus, Limnonectes timorensis, Litoria everetti, and Polypedates leucomystax. A new species of microlyhid frog belonging to the genus Kaloula has also recently been discovered in Timor.

Late Cretaceous fossils of marine vertebrates are known from Timor-Leste deposits. These include mosasaurs such as Globidens timorensis, lamniforme sharks, coelacanths and the choristodere Champsosaurus.

== Time zone ==
UTC+8:

- (Indonesia) East Nusa Tenggara (West Timor)

UTC+9:

- Timor-Leste (most of state)

== See also ==
- Battle of Timor
- Indonesian occupation of East Timor
- List of divided islands
- List of rulers of Timor
