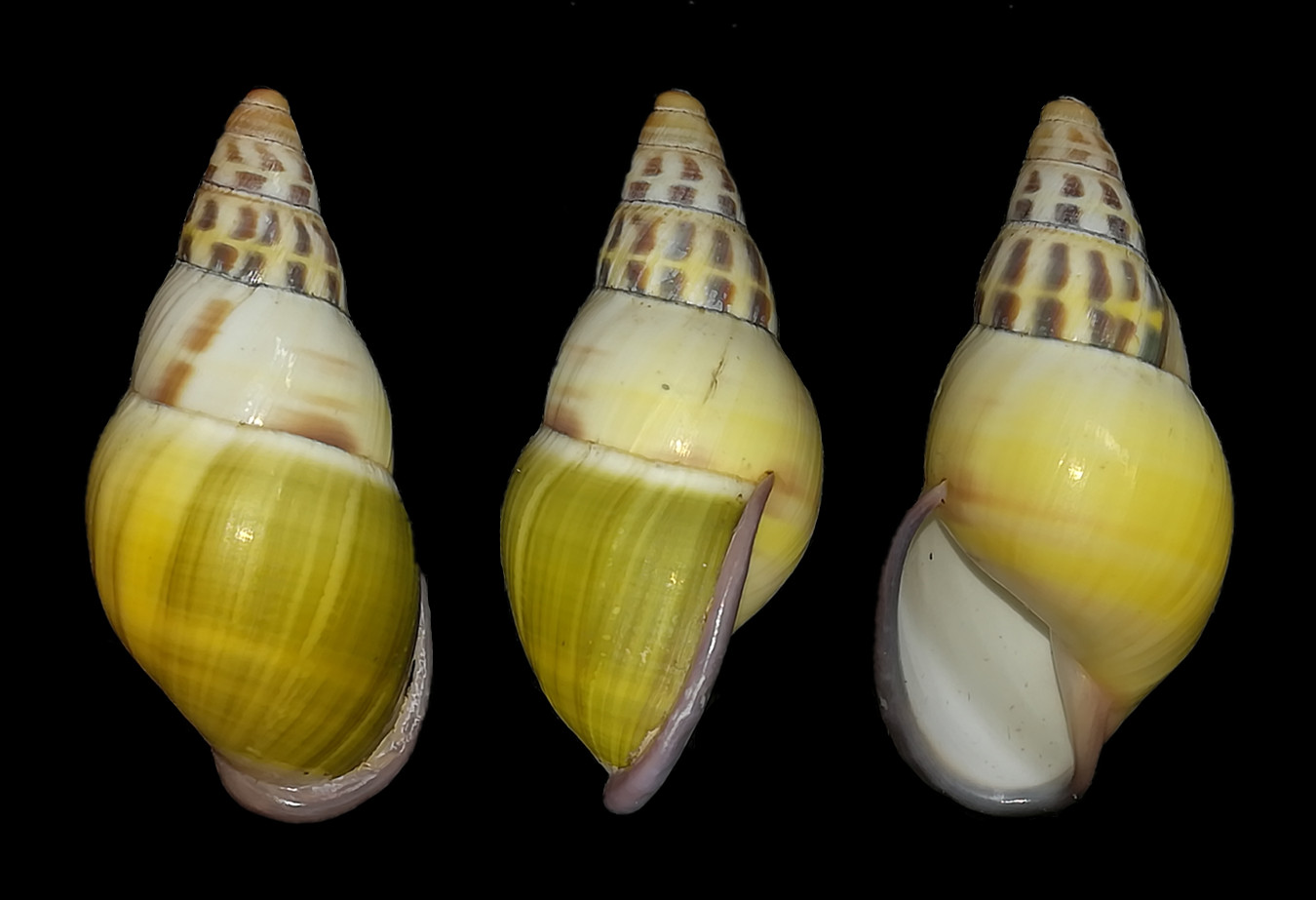

Scientific classification
- Kingdom: Animalia
- Phylum: Mollusca
- Class: Gastropoda
- Order: Stylommatophora
- Family: Camaenidae
- Genus: Amphidromus
- Species: A. abbasorum

Binomial name
- Amphidromus abbasorum Thach, 2017

= Amphidromus abbasorum =

Species of tree snail

Amphidromus abbasorum is a species of air-breathing tree snail, an arboreal gastropod mollusk in the family Camaenidae. It is endemic to West Timor, Indonesia.

== Habitat ==
Amphidromus abbasorum is usually found in an arboreal habitat.

== Distribution ==
The distribution of Amphidromus abbasorum is restricted to South Amarasi, in West Timor, Indonesia.

== Etymology ==
This species is named after the Indonesian Sri Patimah and the American John Abbas, in honour of their work on terrestrial snails of Indonesia.
