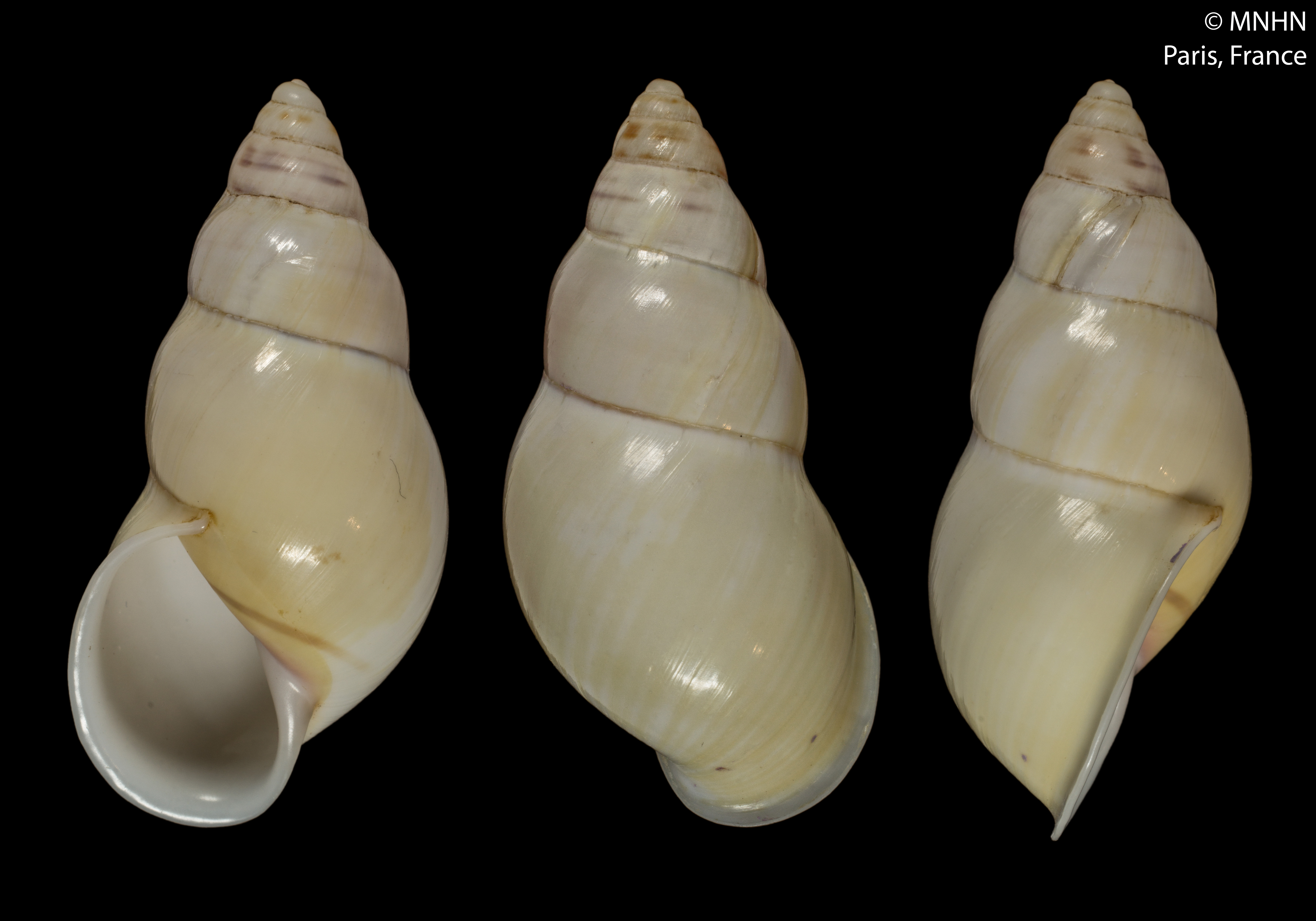
- Shell of Amphidromus keppensdhondtorum (holotype at MNHN, Paris)

Scientific classification
- Kingdom: Animalia
- Phylum: Mollusca
- Class: Gastropoda
- Order: Stylommatophora
- Family: Camaenidae
- Genus: Amphidromus
- Species: A. keppensdhondtorum

Binomial name
- Amphidromus keppensdhondtorum Thach, 2018

= Amphidromus keppensdhondtorum =

Species of snail in the family Camaenidae

Amphidromus keppensdhondtorum is a species of medium-sized air-breathing tree snail, an arboreal gastropod and mollusk in the family Camaenidae.

== Distribution ==
This species occurs on West Timor, Indonesia.

== Habitat ==
This species lives in trees.
