= Betun, Malaka =

Betun
- Town
- Betun
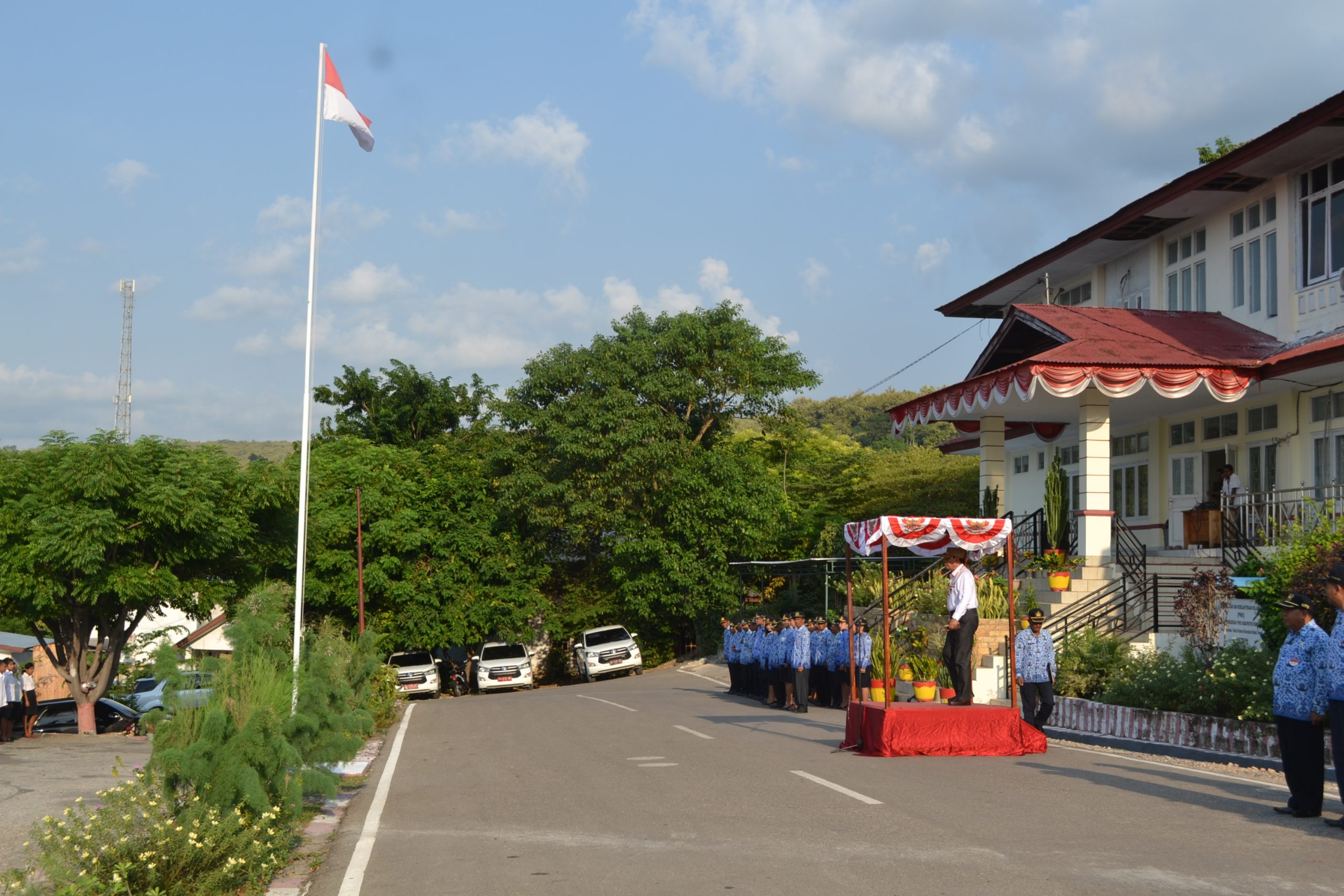
- Government office building in Betun

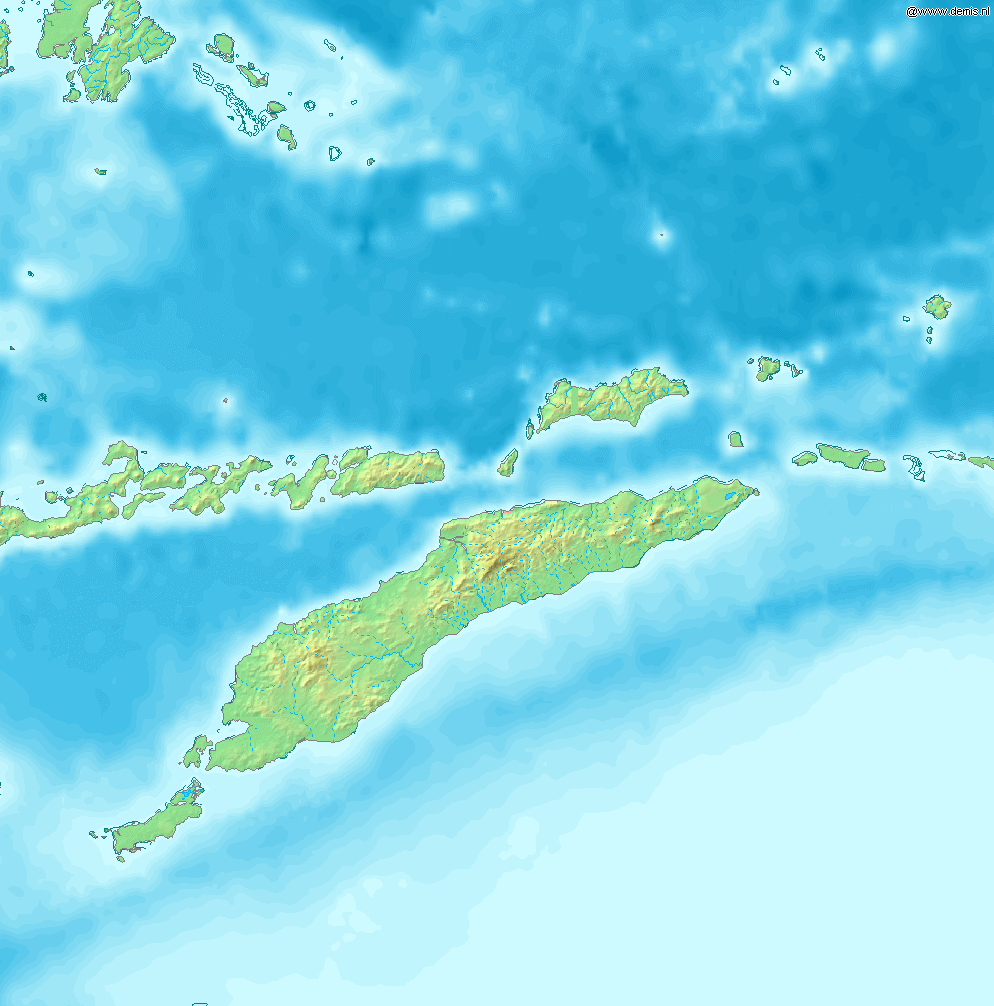
- Location in Timor, Lesser Sunda Islands and Indonesia Betun (Lesser Sunda Islands) Betun (Indonesia)
- Coordinates: 9°29′43″S 124°57′37″E
- Country: Indonesia
- Region: Lesser Sunda Islands
- Province: East Nusa Tenggara
- Regency: Malaka

Area
  - Total: 168.69 km^{2} (65.13 sq mi)

Population (mid 2024 estimate of Malaka Tengah District)
  - Total: 42,329
  - Density: 250.93/km^{2} (649.90/sq mi)
- Time zone: UTC+8 (WITA)
- Area code: (+62) 389
- Website: belukab.go.id

Betun is the capital of Malaka Regency, East Nusa Tenggara, Indonesia. Aside from Atambua, this town was also one of the shelters for refugees from neighboring Timor-Leste, who fled because of the violence and destruction that erupted after East Timor voted for independence from Indonesia in 1999. When violence erupted in Timor-Leste in 2006, there was again an influx of refugees.

== Geography ==
Betun is a town located in West Timor which serves as the capital of Malaka Regency, and is also the administrative center of Malaka Tengah district.

== Demographics ==
Besides Atambua and Kefamenanu, Betun was also one of the reception centres for refugees from Timor-Leste, during the 1999 and 2006 Crisis between Indonesia and Timor-Leste.
