= Great Timor =

Geographical concept

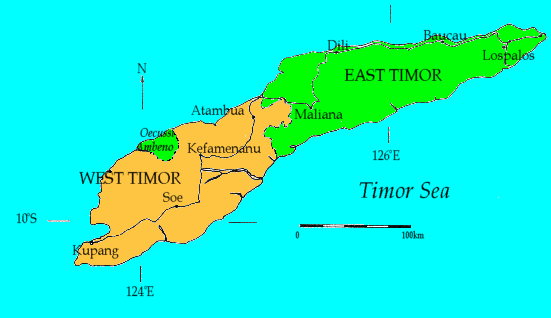
The island of Timor.

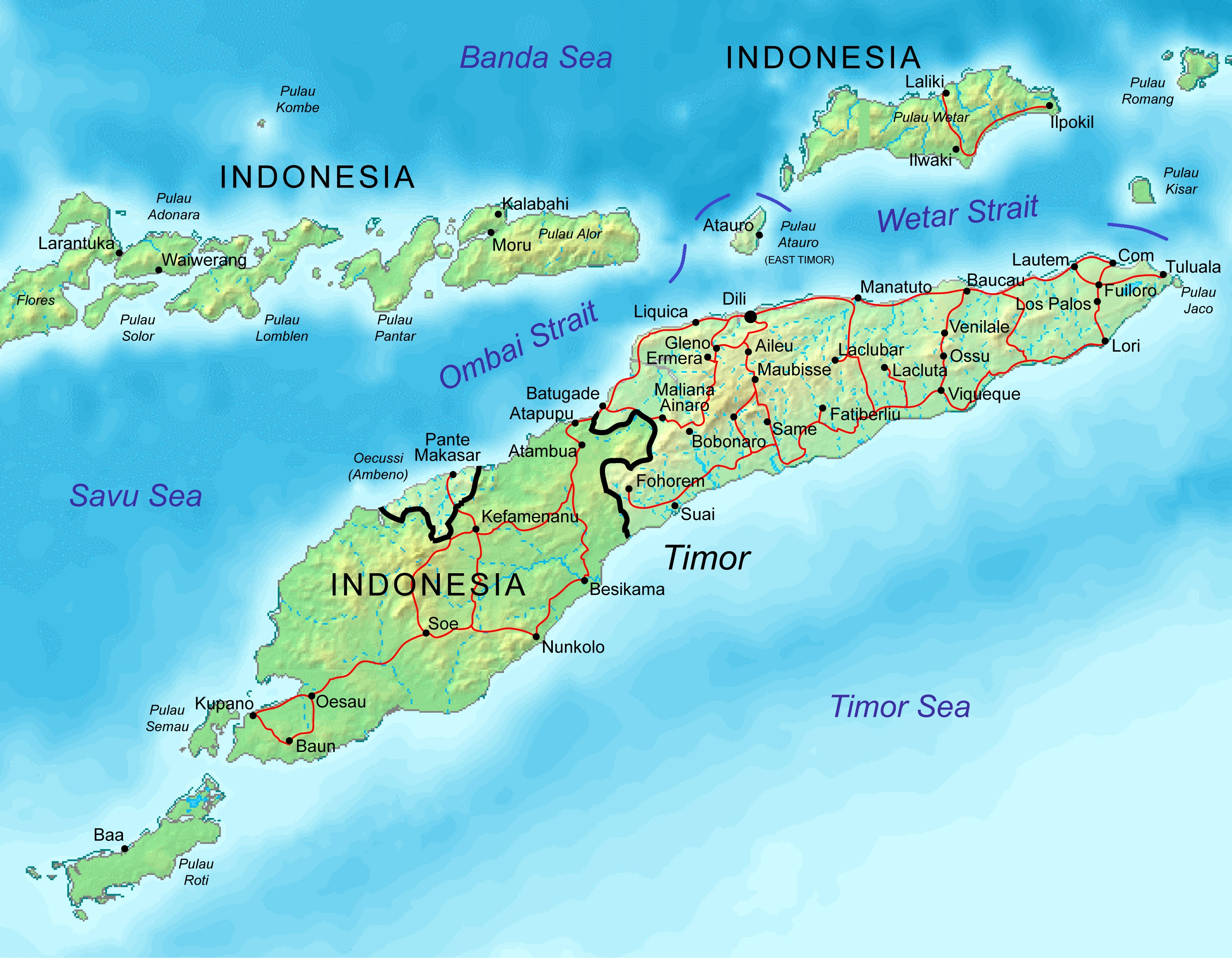
The island of Timor.

Great Timor (Portuguese: Grande Timor; Indonesian: Timor Raya) refers to the irredentist concept of a united and independent island of Timor, which is currently divided between the independent state of Timor-Leste and the Indonesian territory of West Timor. The concept of unifying (or re-unifying) the island has been raised since the mid-20th century.

== History ==
Historically, the idea of uniting Timor island had been expressed by several Timorese groups. The earliest reference point is the pre-colonial Empire of Wehali, whose center was in today's West Timor, but the ruling group was the Tetun speaking Belunese associated with the inhabitants of the Eastern Timor.

During the Japanese occupation of the island (1942–1945), there were some Japanese and Timorese efforts to unite West and East Timor through match-making between the traditional authorities of Dutch and Portuguese Timor. Tōru Maeda (a Japanese intelligence agent, later poet, who served in Viqueque and Atambua) was instrumental in a matchmaking between the family of Don. Joaquim da Costa of Ossu and the Nai-Buti clan in Atambua.

During 1974–75, APODETI, an East Timorese party expressed its will to integrate East Timor and West Timor through an integration into the Republic of Indonesia. This idea was reflected in the original Portuguese version of so-called Balibo Declaration in which the signatories lamented the separation with the "Indonesian people of Timor" through demarcation of the colonial borders.

Timor-Leste was invaded and occupied by Indonesia in 1975, which annexed the territory as its "27th Province" in 1976, but in a referendum held in 1999, the people of East Timor voted to end Indonesian occupation and become an independent state. This caused widespread anger among many Indonesian nationalists, particularly in the military.

In 2001 and 2002, before Timor-Leste's independence, there were claims by the Indonesian military and some commentators, that this would inspire the secession of West Timor from Indonesia.

FRETILIN's independence movement never laid claim to West Timor at any time, before the Indonesian invasion or thereafter. After the restoration of independence in 2002, the government of Timor-Leste fully recognises Indonesia's existing boundaries as inherited from the Netherlands East Indies.

As of 2023, APODETI party administrators and members still espouses the goal of Great Timor reunification within Indonesia, through referendum.

== See also ==
- Timor-Leste
- West Timor
- History of Timor-Leste
- History of West Timor
- Separatism in Indonesia
- Ethnic conflicts in Indonesia
