= South Central Timor Regency =

Regency in East Nusa Tenggara, Indonesia

South Central Timor Regency Kabupaten Timor Tengah Selatan
- Regency
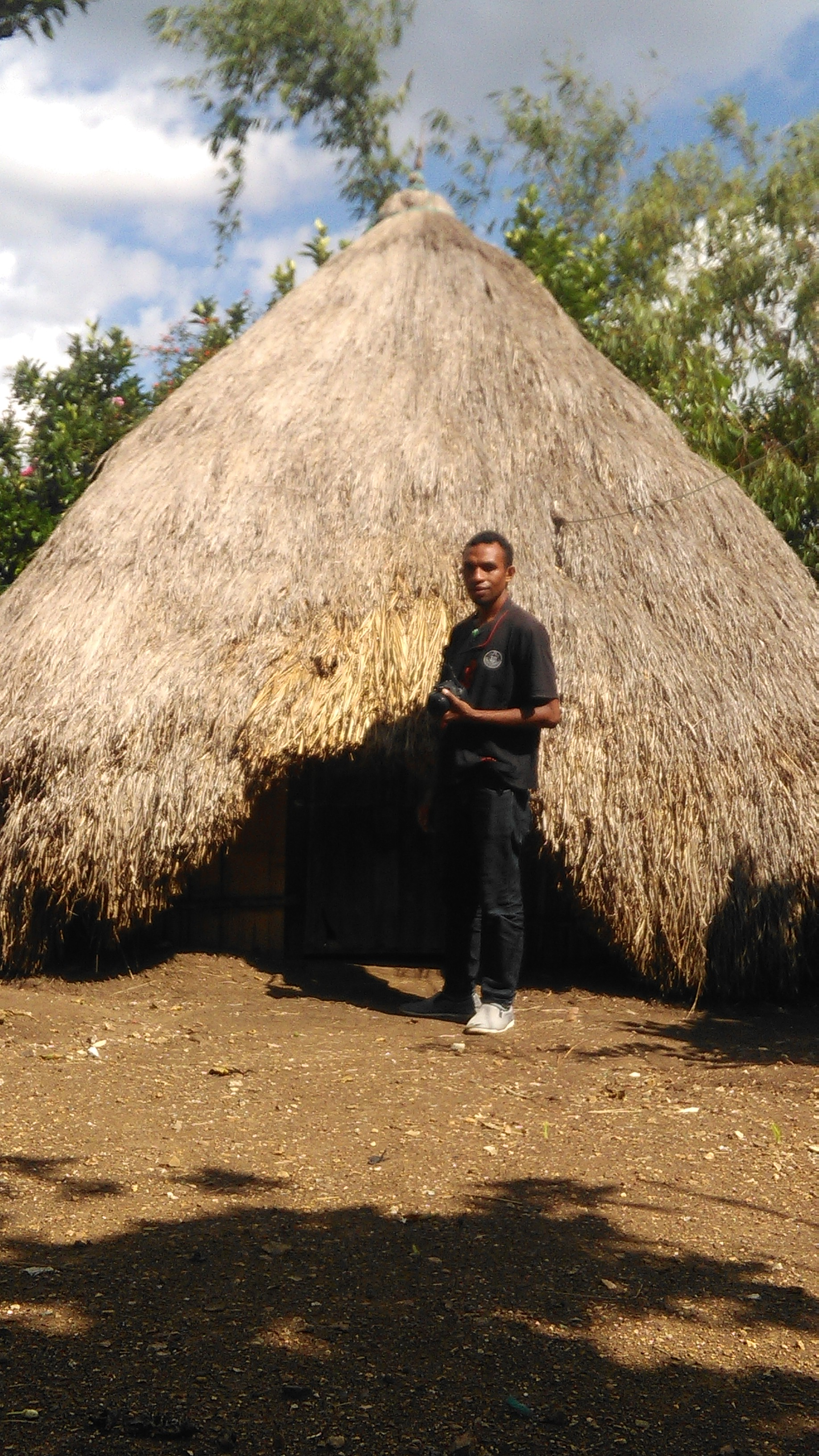
- A rumah bulat ("round house") traditional house of South Central Timor

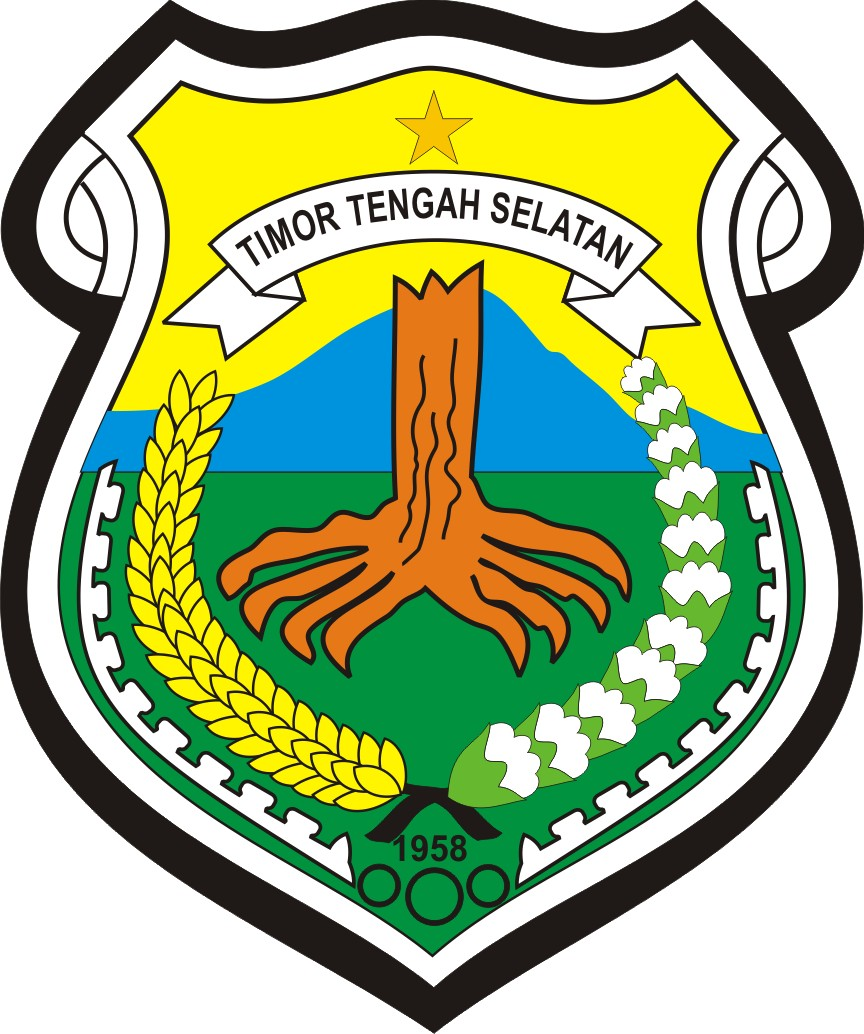
- Coat of arms

- Location within East Nusa Tenggara

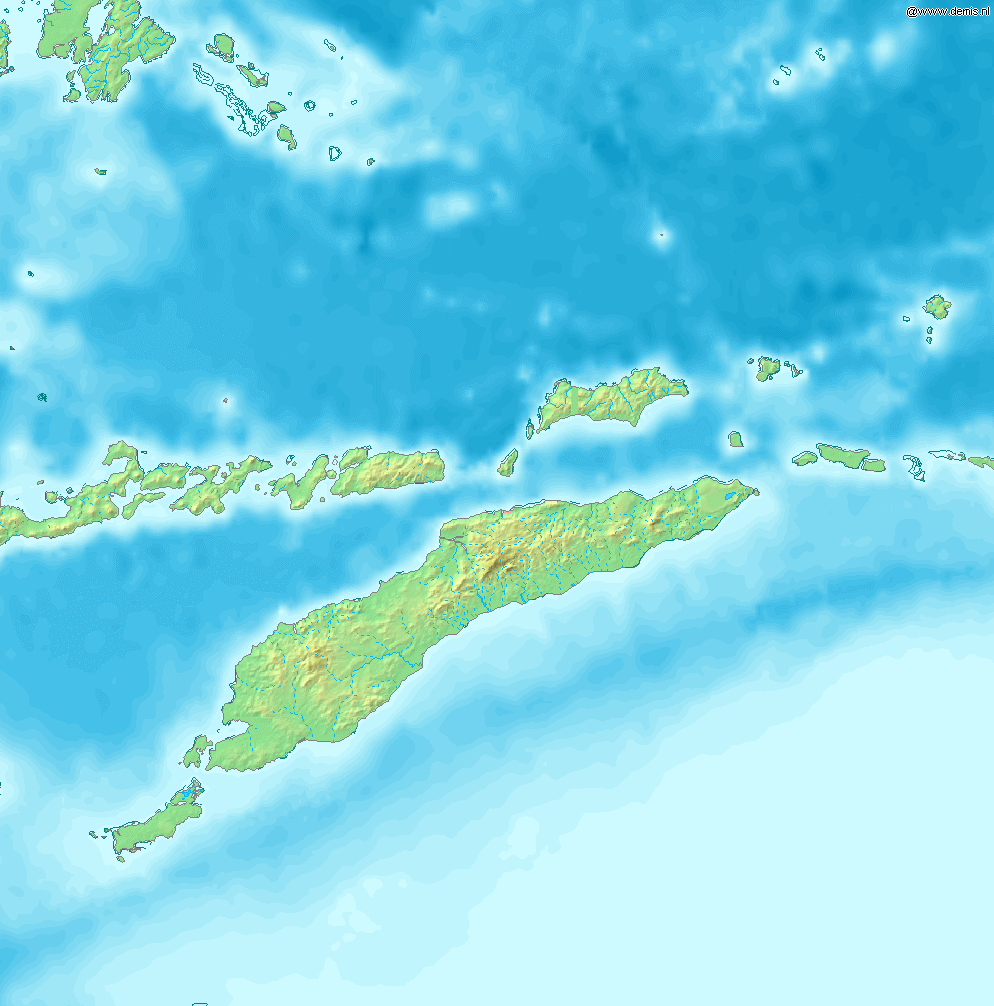
- Location in Timor, Lesser Sunda Islands and Indonesia South Central Timor Regency (Lesser Sunda Islands) South Central Timor Regency (Indonesia)
- Coordinates: 9°28′18″S 124°48′17″E
- Country: Indonesia
- Region: Lesser Sunda Islands
- Province: East Nusa Tenggara
- Capital: Soe

Government
  - Regent: Eduard Markus Lioe
  - Vice Regent: Johny Army Konay

Area
  - Total: 3,955.36 km^{2} (1,527.17 sq mi)

Population (mid 2025 estimate)
  - Total: 487,999
  - Density: 123.377/km^{2} (319.544/sq mi)
- Area code: (+62) 388
- Website: ttskab.go.id

South Central Timor Regency (Indonesian: Kabupaten Timor Tengah Selatan) is a regency in East Nusa Tenggara province of Indonesia, established in 1958. the regency has its seat (capital) in the town of Soe. It covers an area of 3,955.36 km^{2} and had a population of 440,470 at the 2010 Census and 455,410 at the 2020 Census; the official estimate as of mid-2025 was 487,999 (comprising 242,011 males and 245,988 females).

Mount Mutis, the highest mountain in the province of East Nusa Tenggara, is in the northern part of the regency. International visitors have noted that the region is rich in bird life and so is a good site for birdwatching.

== Demographics ==
Of the population in mid 2025, 133,811 (27.42%) were below the age of 15, and 354,188 were aged 15 and above; of the latter, 316,029 (64.76%) were of working age and 38,159 (7.82%) were aged 65 and above.

== Economy ==
The local economy in the area is poor and underdeveloped. Subsistence agriculture is the main economic activity in many villages. In addition, when opportunities are available, some local village communities sometimes undertake unregulated mining or other resource-based activities. For example, in the Kolbano Beach area south of Soe, there is a local industry in the collection of coloured stones. The stones, which come in a range of attractive shapes and sizes, are sold to local companies. The companies in turn export the stones to countries such as Australia, China, Malaysia, Singapore and elsewhere. Sacks of stones sell (mid-2012) for between Rp 10,000 to Rp 25,000 (about US$1.00 to US$2.50). Local villagers are reported to be able to earn around Rp 50,000 (US$5) per day collecting stones although there are complaints that the prices paid to workers who collect the stones are too low.

However, there are concerns amongst some local community groups, such as the Mollo people in the Mount Mutis Sanctuary, about the environmental impacts of mining in the area. There has been social resistance, for example, to the activities of mining firms conducting marble quarrying. Partly as a result of the local resistance, marble mining firms abandoned their work in the area in 2010.

== Administration ==
The regency is divided into thirty-two districts (kecamatan), tabulated below with their areas and their populations at the 2010 Census and the 2020 Census, together with the official estimates as of mid-2025. The table also includes the locations of the district administrative centres, the number of administrative villages in each district (totaling 266 rural desa and 12 urban kelurahan), and its post code. They are grouped below for convenience into three geographical sectors (which have no administrative function) plus the regency capital, Soe. Outside of the urban area of Soe, the highest average population densities are in the eastern sector (with 153 people per km^{2}), while the lowest average population densities lie in the northeast sector (with less than 75 people per km^{2}).

Kode Wilayah	Name of District (kecamatan)	English name	Area in km^{2}	Pop'n Census 2010	Pop'n Census 2020	Pop'n estimate mid 2025	Admin centre	No. of villages	Post codes
53.02.03	Mollo Utara	North Mollo	208.22	23,282	22,870	24,003	Kapan	18	85552
53.02.12	Fatumnasi		198.65	6,661	6,780	7,171	Kuanoel	5	85561
53.02.31	Tobu		98.89	9,377	9,930	10,714	Tobu	8	85552 ^{(a)}
53.02.32	Nunbena		134.49	5,078	5,460	5,939	Numbena	6	85544
53.02.02	Mollo Selatan	South Mollo	147.18	15,122	17,420	18,930	Siso	7	85542
53.02.13	Polen		250.29	13,668	13,760	14,488	Puna	11	85545
53.02.22	Mollo Barat	West Mollo	165.14	7,493	7,300	7,662	Kiukole	5	85541
53.02.30	Mollo Tengah	Central Mollo	99.68	7,128	7,670	8,340	Saktao	6	85543
Totals	Northwestern (Mollo) Sector		1,302.54	87,809	91,190	97,247		66	
53.02.01	Kota Soe	Soe Town	28.08	39,285	40,190	42,657	Soe	13 ^{(b)}	85511 -85519
Totals	Town (Soe) Sector		28.08	39,285	40,190	42,657		13	
53.02.07	Amanuban Barat	West Amanuban	114.30	21,752	24,840	27,812	Neonmat	8	85551 ^{(c)}
53.02.14	Batu Putih		102.32	12,129	13,350	14,685	Oebobo	7	85565
53.02.27	Kuatnana		141.22	14,903	16,320	17,896	Tetaf	8	85551
53.02.06	Amanuban Selatan	South Amanuban	326.01	24,051	24,430	25,838	Panite	10	85562
53.02.26	Noebeba		186.02	11,358	12,290	13,397	Oepliki	7	85567
53.02.11	Kuanfatu		136.52	18,977	19,700	21,056	Kuanfatu	13	85564
53.02.21	Kualin		195.84	20,895	20,400	21,416	Kualin	8	85566
53.02.05	Amanuban Tengah	Central Amanuban	87.71	15,172	16,130	17,177	Niki-Niki	10 ^{(d)}	85571
53.02.19	Kolbano		108.70	18,476	19,260	20,627	Kolbano	12	85563
53.02.18	Oenino		154.96	10,533	11,068	12,725	Oenino	7	85583
53.02.04	Amanuban Timur	East Amanuban	149.26	16,623	16,110	16,913	Oe’Ekam	10	85572
53.02.28	Fautmolo		46.34	7,256	7,460	7,935	Oeleon	7	85582
53.02.29	Fatukopa		65.59	4,996	5,870	6,655	Nunfutu	7	85581
Totals	Southern (Amanuban) Sector		1,814.77	197,121	207,228	224,132		114	
53.02.10	Kie		162.78	21,318	23,140	25,276	Napi	13	85575
53.02.20	Kot'olin		58.94	11,125	10,650	11,182	Hoibeti	8	85576
53.02.98	Amanatun Selatan	South Amanatun	82.64	16,568	18,380	19,440	Oinlasi	13	85573
53.02.15	Boking		94.58	9,892	9,630	10,112	Boking	7	85584
53.02.17	Nunkolo		69.09	13,744	13,410	14,076	Nunkolo	9	85586
53.02.24	Noebana		49.63	4,662	4,780	5,080	Noebana	5	85585
53.02.25	Santian		48.17	6,477	6,000	6,295	Santian	5	85587
53.02.09	Amanatun Utara	North Amanatun	105.84	16,348	16,160	16,894	Snok	9	85574
53.02.16	Toianas		103.95	12,382	11,860	12,454	Toianas	9	85578
53.02.23	Kokbaun		34.32	3,163	3,010	3,154	Lotas	6	85577
Totals	Eastern (Amanatun) Sector		809.94	115,679	117,020	123,963		84	
Totals for	Regency		3,955.36	440,470	455,410	487,999	Soe	278	

Notes: (a) except the two desa (villages) of Bonleu and Tune (which have a post code of 85561).
(b) comprising 11 kelurahan (Cendana, Kampung Baru, Karang Sirih, Kobekamusa, Kuatae, Nonohonis, Nunumeu, Oekefan, Oebesa, Soe and Taubneno) and 2 desa.
The kelurahan of Kobekamusa is an exclave to the east of the town, separated from the rest of Kota Soe by part of Amanuban Barat District.
(c) except the desa (village) of Mnelalete (which has a post code of 85514). (d) including one kelurahan - Niki-Niki (with 3,189 inhabitants in 2024).
