= West Timor =

Coordinates: 10°23′S 123°38′E

West Timor Timor Barat Dutch Timor Indonesian Timor
- Region
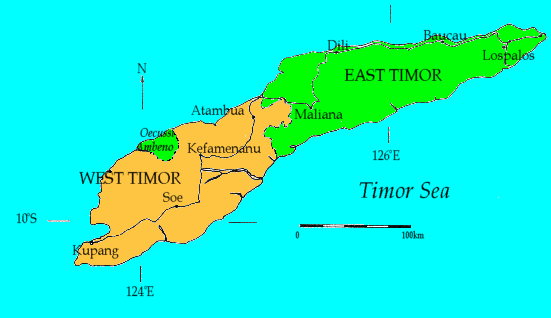
- Location of West Timor (orange) in Timor Island.
- Country: Indonesia
- Province: East Nusa Tenggara
- Largest city: Kupang
- Regencies: Belu, Kupang, Malaka, North Central Timor, South Central Timor

Area (Note: The area of West Timor is 14,513 square kilometers excluding the offshore islands.)
  - Total: 15,000 km^{2} (5,800 sq mi)
- Elevation (Mount Mutis): 2,427 m (7,963 ft)

Population (mid 2024 estimate)
  - Total: 2,060,311
  - Density: 140/km^{2} (360/sq mi)
- Time zone: UTC+8 (Central Indonesia Time)
- Area code: (62)3xx
- Vehicle sign: DH
- HDI: ▲0.631 (Medium)

West Timor (Indonesian: Timor Barat; Portuguese: Timor Ocidental) is a region covering the Indonesian-administered, western part of the island of Timor (except the East Timorese exclave of Oecusse). Administratively, West Timor is part of Indonesia's East Nusa Tenggara province. The largest city and main port is Kupang. During the colonial period, the area was named Dutch Timor and was a centre of Dutch loyalists during the Indonesian National Revolution (1945–1949). From 1949 to 1975 it was called Indonesian Timor. West Timor has a population of around 2 million.

The total area of West Timor is 14,513.03 km^{2} (5,603.51 sq mi), excluding offshore islands. The highest peaks are Mount Mutis, 2,427 meters (7,963 ft) above sea level, and Mount Lakaan, 1,600 meters (5,249 ft) above sea level. Indonesian is widely spoken in West Timor, along with local languages including Bunak, Dawan, Helong, Kemak, and Tetun language, some of which are also spoken in Timor-Leste. Kupang is the capital of East Nusa Tenggara and the largest city in West Timor. Other major towns include Atambua, Kefamenanu, Soe, and Betun.

== History ==
=== Pre-colonial period ===
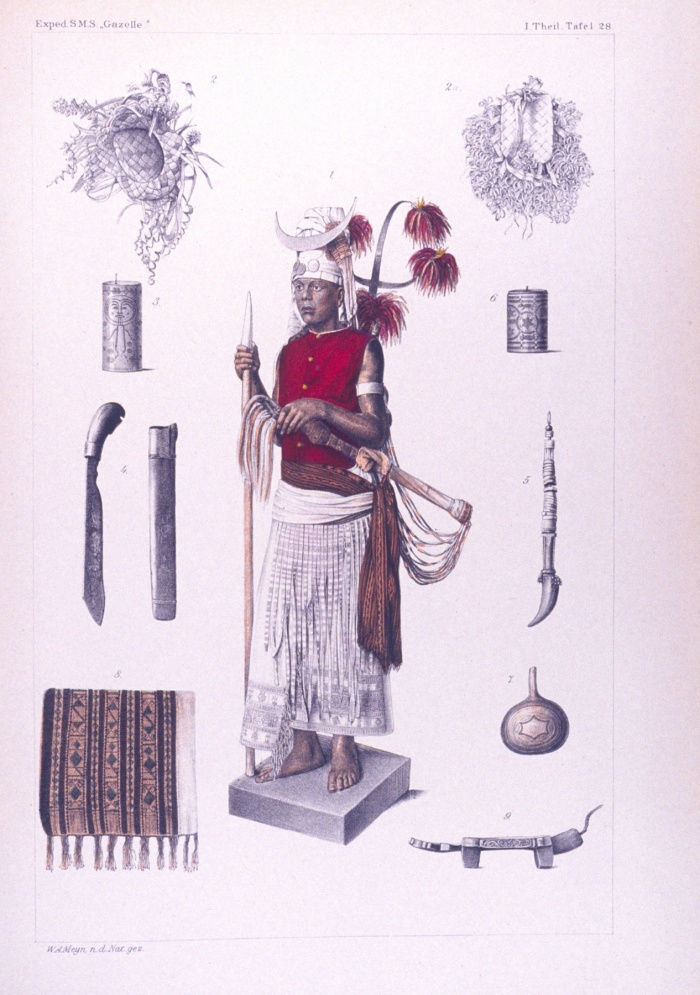
Warriors from the region around Kupang (1875). Engraving from the Gazelle expedition report

The population of Timor came to the island as part of the general settlement of the region. Anthropologists assume that the descendants of three waves of immigration live here, which also explains Timor's ethnic-cultural diversity. Australo-Papuans are thought to have reached Timor from the north and west around 40,000 to 20,000 BC, during the last Ice Age. The Atoin Meto, who dominate West Timor, are considered the descendants of this first wave of settlers, although their language is one of the Austronesian languages. The same applies to the Helong, who originally inhabited the region around Kupang and were displaced by the Atoin Meto to the far western tip of the island. Around 3000 BC, Melanesians came from the west with a second wave of immigration and brought the oval axe culture to Timor. The Bunak people in the borderland to Timor-Leste are among their descendants. The last peoples to migrate to Timor in prehistoric times were the Malay peoples. There are different indications as to whether the Malays reached Timor in one or two waves. The proto-Malays from southern China and northern Indochina, probably reached Timor in 2500 BC. They spread throughout the archipelago under pressure from the expansion of the East Asian peoples. Probably around 500 AD, Deutero-Malays (who emerged from Iron Age Austronesian peoples who came equipped with more advanced farming techniques and new knowledge of metals) became the dominant population throughout the archipelago and also reached Timor. The Tetum in eastern West Timor form the largest ethnic group in East Timor and are descendants of the Malay immigrants, as are the Kemak people living on the border.

Recent cultural contacts of West Timor's dominant population, the Atoin Meto, are due to the interest of various Asian (India and China) and European (Portugal and the Netherlands) traders in the island's formerly very rich sandalwood resources. This sandalwood trade with Southeast Asia, which took place over centuries, did not leave Timorese cultures unscathed. All buyers of Timorese sandalwood have left their mark from a cultural point of view.

=== Portuguese ===
The first European colonization of Timor was in the 16th century. In 1512 (other sources mention 1509 or 1511), the Portuguese navigator António de Abreu was the first European to discover the island of Timor in search of the Spice Islands. When the first Portuguese reached Timor, they found the population divided into many small kingdoms (Indonesian: kerajaan) that were relatively independent of each other. The centre of the island was dominated by the Wehale (Wehali) kingdom with its allies among the tribes of the Tetum, Bunak and Kemak ethnic groups. The Tetum formed the core of the kingdom. The capital Laran village on the territory of today's West Timor formed the spiritual centre of the entire island at that time. Following the Wehale model, a second kingdom arose in West Timor, that of the Sonba'i kingdom.

In 1556, the Dominican Order founded the village of Lifau, six kilometres west of today's Pante Macassar, to secure the sandalwood trade. Portugal initially established few garrisons and trading posts on Timor. Only when the threat from the Dutch increased did the Portuguese begin to expand their positions. Dutch traders first reached Timor in 1568.

To extend their control to the interior of the island, the Portuguese began a large-scale invasion in 1642 under Francisco Fernandes. However, this action was justified by the protection of the Christianised rulers of the coastal region. The previous Christianisation supported the Portuguese in their quick and brutal victory, as their influence on the Timorese had already weakened the resistance. Fernandes first moved through the Sonba'i area and then quickly conquered the kingdom of Wehale, which was considered the religious and political centre of the island. After the victory, the immigration of the Topasses continued to increase. They were mestizos whose ancestors were inhabitants of the islands of Solor and Flores and Portuguese. The centre of the Topasses became Lifau, the main Portuguese base on Timor. Later, the Topasses also settled inland at the present-day villages of Kefamenanu and Niki-Niki. They were given land by the local rulers and soon formed their own local kingdoms, such as Noimuti, and became a power on the island. Two clans, the Hornay and the Costa, at times controlled large parts of Timor, which was not without conflict between them.

=== Netherlands ===
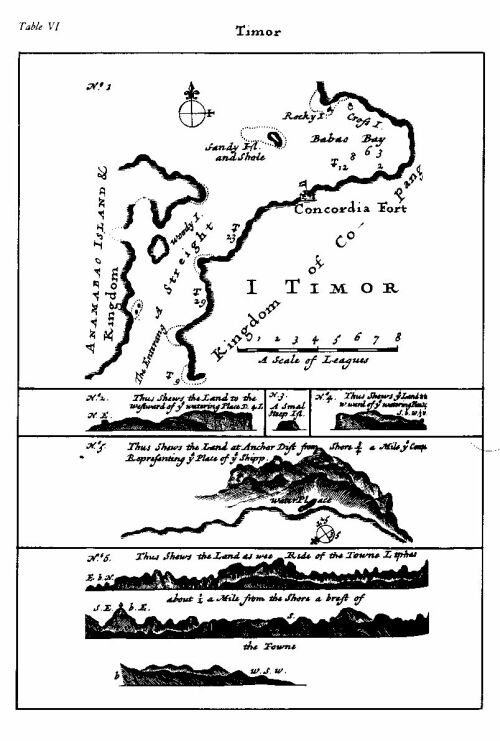
The Kingdom of Copang on a map by William Dampier, 1699

In 1640, the Dutch built their first fortress on Timor near Kupang and the political division of the island began. Kupang Bay was considered the best natural harbour on the entire island. From 1642, a simple fort again protected the Portuguese post. Two Dutch attacks on it failed in 1644. For better defence, the Dominicans under Antonio de São Jacointo built a new fortress in 1647, but in 1653 the Dutch destroyed the Portuguese post and finally conquered it on 27 January 1656 with a strong force under General Arnold de Vlamigh van Outshoorn. However, the Dutch had to withdraw from the fortress immediately due to heavy losses after following the Topasse outside Kupang. For the time being, however, the Dutch sphere of influence remained limited to this region of Timor, with the exception of Maubara, which fell to the Dutch in 1667. Until the final conquest of the Portuguese fortress in Kupang Bay in 1688, the Dutch East India Company (VOC) concluded treaties with the five small rulers in this area, the "five loyal allies" (Sonbai Kecil, Helong, Amabi in 1665, Amfo'an in 1683 and Taebenu in 1688). In the middle of the 18th century, Timor was divided into two halves from a Portuguese perspective. The smaller western part consisted of the province of Servião with 16 local kingdoms and was controlled by the Topasses. The eastern half was the province of Belu (Bellum) and consisted of 46 kingdoms. Three times the Topasses also tried to expel the Dutch from Timor. However, when an attack by the Portuguese and Topasses on Kupang ended in disaster in 1749, despite superior numbers, the rule of both in West Timor collapsed. At the Battle of Penfui (today Kupang's El Tari International Airport is located there), Capitão-Mor Gaspar da Costa and many other Topasse leaders were killed. A total of 40,000 warriors of the Topasses and their allies are said to have perished. As a result of the defeat, the rule of the Portuguese and Topasses in West Timor collapsed.

In April 1751, Liurais of Servião rose up; according to one source, Gaspar only met his death here. In 1752, the Dutch attacked the Amarasi Kingdom and the Topasse Kingdom of Noimuti. This attack was led by the German Hans Albrecht von Plüskow, who was the Dutch commander of Kupang. He was to be killed by a Topasse assassination plot in Lifau in 1761. The Dutch also used this campaign to hunt slaves to serve the needs of the plantations in the Moluccas. In 1752, the Bishop of Malacca branded the Dutch trade in slaves, which were also sold to Chinese and Arabs, as a crime that would lead to excommunication for Catholics.

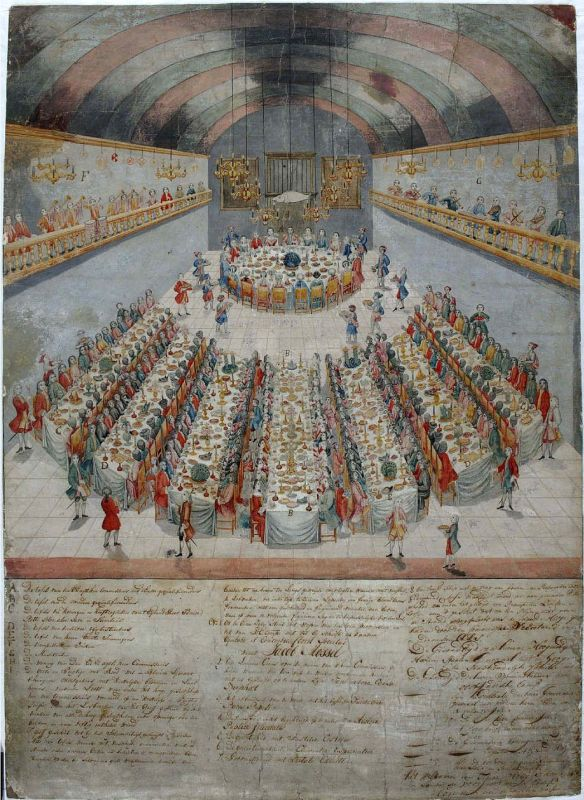
Festivity at which Paravicini is surrounded by local rulers, 1756

In 1755, the Dutch East India Company (VOC) sent John Andrew Paravicini to negotiate treaties with rulers in several of the Lesser Sunda Islands. In 1756, 48 Lesser Kings of Solor, Roti, Sawu, Sumba and much of West Timor made alliances with the VOC. This was the beginning of Dutch rule in what is now Indonesian West Timor. Among them was a certain Jacinto Correa (Hiacijinto Corea), King of Wewiku-Wehale and Grand Prince of Belu, who also signed the dubious Treaty of Paravicini on behalf of 27 territories dependent on him in central Timor. Fortunately for the Portuguese, Wehale was no longer powerful enough to pull all the local rulers over to the side of the Dutch. Thus, the eastern former vassals of Wehale remained under the flag of Portugal, while Wehale itself fell under Dutch rule.

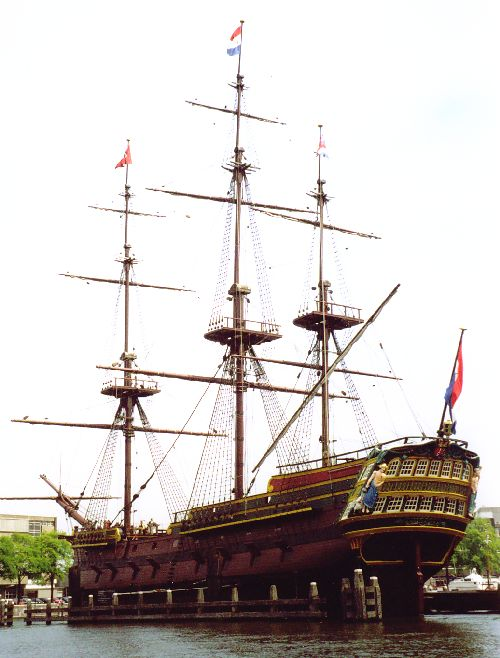
Replica of a Dutch East Indiaman from 1748

On 11 August 1769, the Portuguese governor António José Teles de Meneses was forced to leave Lifau by the Topasses. The new capital of the Portuguese on Timor became Dili in the east of the island. The Topaz Francisco da Hornay offered Lifau to the Dutch, but after careful consideration they refused.

However, Dutch power remained limited in the west and was primarily in the hands of their Timorese allies. In 1681, the Dutch conquered the western island of Roti, from where slaves were subsequently brought to Timor. The Dutch also recruited soldiers for their army there and built schools after the local ruler converted to Christianity in 1729. The Rotinese people became a well-educated elite. To use them as a counterweight to the Timorese, the Dutch encouraged their immigration to West Timor, so that they are still present here today.

But the Dutch also had to contend with rebellions in the 1750s and 1780s. The worst was the renewed loss of Greater Sonba'i. The ruler, Kau Sonbai, openly broke with the Dutch from 1783, left Kupang and re-established Sonba'i as an independent inland kingdom, constantly pitting Dutch and Portuguese against each other. Little Sonbai remained under Dutch control. The reason for the rebellions was probably the deficiencies in the administration of the VOC, which now became openly apparent with the expansion of the domain. After 1733, the VOC had an acute shortage of personnel due to malaria epidemics in Batavia. The situation was even worse in Kupang, where mortality among Europeans was particularly high due to malaria. Paravicini, of all people, who had praised the VOC so much in his treaty, described their personnel as bad, dishonest, greedy, cruel and disobedience would run rampant with him. They forced local rulers to buy goods at outrageous prices and Opperhoofd (settlers) preyed on the impoverished rajas. The Timorese kingdoms were forced to send troops and 200 men annually to pan for gold in the mountains. Neither the military expeditions nor the gold prospecting brought the desired success. Instead, discontent among the Timorese grew. This was also because accidents during the search for gold could also be dangerous for the regents. A Dutchman reported in 1777, when five gold mines had collapsed, that relatives of the victims could take revenge on the rulers who had sent them to search for gold. There were also problems with corruption and also with the Mardijkers, the Dutch equivalent of the Topasse, but most of whom had not adopted the Christian faith. They were seen as an arrogant group that sought to expand their influence in the region.

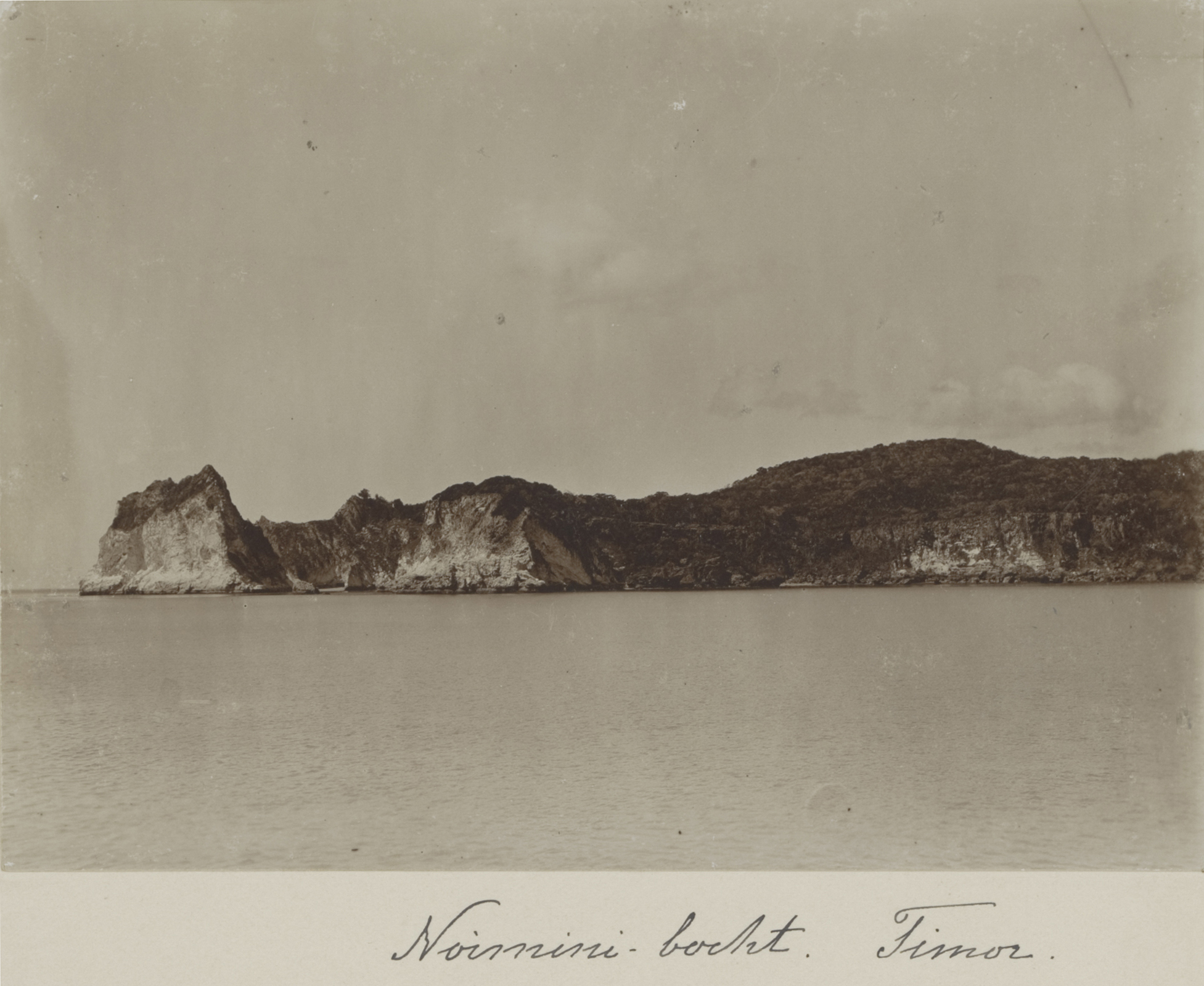
Noimini Bay on the south coast of West Timor. Photo of the Siboga expedition by Max Wilhelm Carl Weber (1899/1900).

William Bligh reached Kupang with his faithful in 1789 after being marooned at sea during the mutiny on the Bounty.

In 1790, a rebellion in Sonba'i and Maubara was put down by the Dutch, but the colony continued to be troubled into the 19th century and the Dutch failed to bring the interior of the island under their control. In 1799, the Dutch East India Company went bankrupt and the Dutch government took over rule of West Timor, though without showing much interest in the economically uninteresting and distant Kupang. Trade was primarily conducted by the Chinese.

In 1797, the British attempted to occupy Kupang, fearing that France might establish itself here after the occupation of the Netherlands. However, the British were driven out by the Dutch commander with the help of local people and slaves. The subsequent collapse of the company meant that in 1799, the area returned to official Dutch rule. During the Napoleonic Wars, the British succeeded in occupying Kupang in 1811. In 1812, British control was extended to all of Dutch West Timor. Only after the return of the House of Orange-Nassau to the Dutch throne did the Dutch officially regain their Timorese possessions on 7 October 1816. As early as 1815, Dutch troops had unsuccessfully tried to bring the rebellious Raja of Amanuban (Amanubang) back under their control. He was a Christian ruler in West Timor who had been educated in Kupang and had also visited the Dutch colonial metropolis of Batavia. In 1816, a second military expedition failed disastrously due to Timorese guerrilla tactics. Sixty Dutch soldiers died, while the rebels suffered only six casualties. Until 1915, the Dutch still had to send military expeditions into the interior almost every year to pacify the native population, mostly against the Amanuban Kingdom.

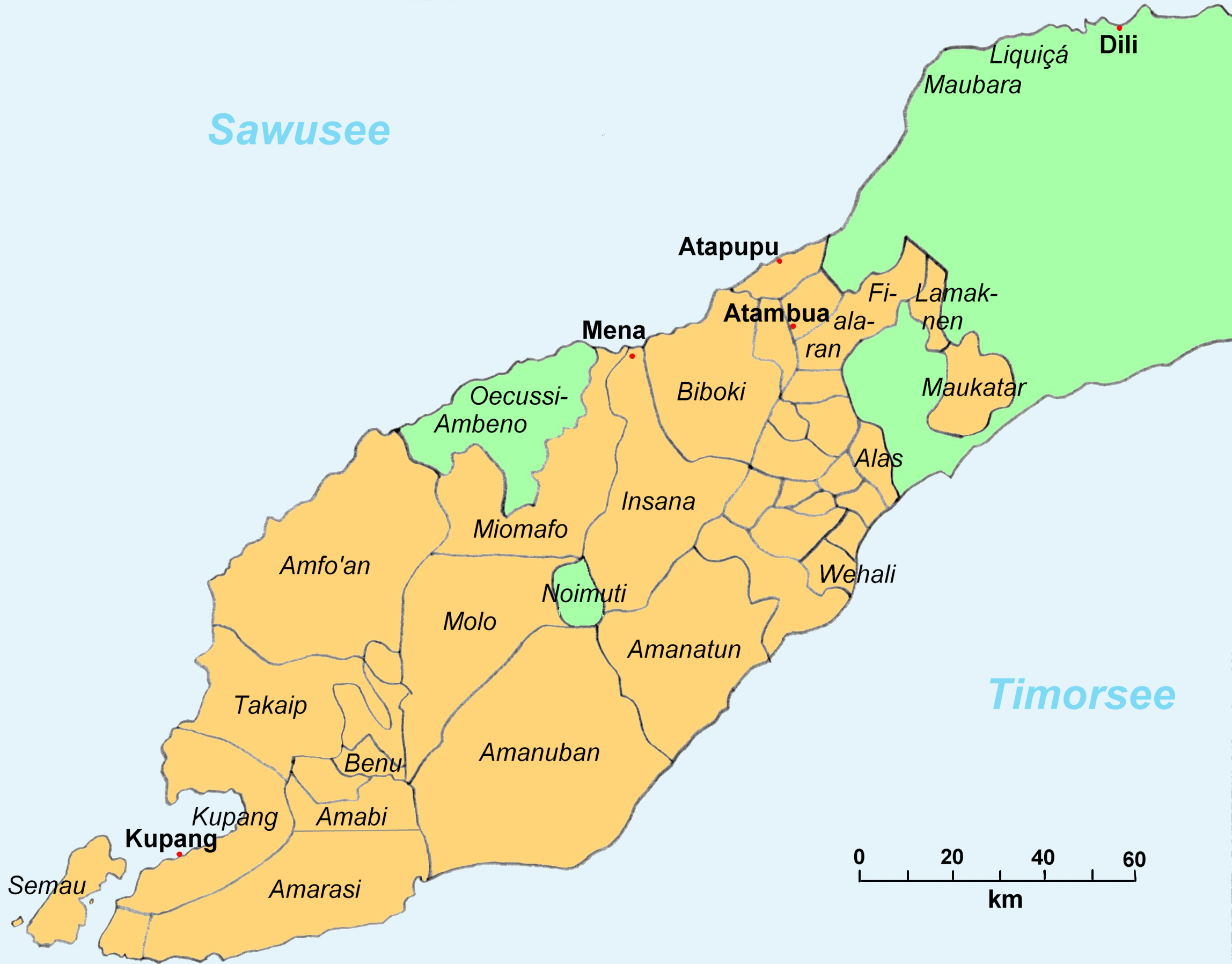
Dutch (orange) and Portuguese (green) Timor as seen by the Netherlands (1911)

In 1851, the Portuguese governor José Joaquim Lopes de Lima reached an agreement with the Dutch on the colonial boundaries in Timor, but without authorisation from Lisbon. In it, the western part, except for the exclave of Oe-Cusse Ambeno, was ceded to the Dutch. Needless to say, the governor fell from grace and was deposed when Lisbon learned of the treaty. But the agreements could not be undone, even though the treaty on boundaries was renegotiated in 1854 and not ratified until 1859 as the Treaty of Lisbon. The various small kingdoms of Timor were divided under Dutch and Portuguese authority. The treaty had some weaknesses, however. One enclave without access to the sea remained in the territory of the other side. In addition, the imprecise borders of the Timorese kingdoms and their traditional claims were the basis for the colonial demarcation.

From 1872 onwards, the Dutch left "internal affairs" to the native rulers, who were thus able to continue unhindered with slave trading and piracy and to carry out raids on other places. In 1885, however, one of the larger kingdoms of West Timor, Sonba'i, fell into anarchy after the death of the Raja. When the Dutch governor and his garrison were not in Kupang, the colonial capital was even occupied by the rebels. The Dutch then abandoned their policy of non-interference in the internal affairs of the rulers they controlled. Then Governor-General, Jan Jacob Rochussen, sent troops and placed the interior of the island under military administration. The rulers were again forced to sign a treaty (Korte Verklaring) in which they recognised the sovereignty of the Netherlands and were forbidden contact with foreign powers.

Only after three more negotiations (1893, 1904 and 1913) between the two colonial powers was the problem of the final borders resolved. On 17 August 1916, the treaty was signed in The Hague that defined the border between East and West Timor that still exists today. The wrangling over this border between Portugal and the Netherlands and the views of the indigenous population as to whether they belonged to the West or the East has had consequences that extend to the present day. Various ethnic groups that were part of the Wehale Kingdom or its close allies were divided by the border. Today, Tetum, Bunak and Kemak live both in Indonesian West Timor and in independent East Timor. Traditionally, there are still thoughts among these peoples about a united Timor. There were conflicts between the different Timorese kingdoms, which already had their roots in pre-colonial times. Various reasons could then lead to the outbreak of armed conflicts between the Timorese. For example, the Mold and the Miomafo in south-central West Timor fought over gold mines between 1760 and 1782. From 1864 to 1870, Sonba'i and the Sorbian of Amfo'an fought over the rights to use some betel palms in the Kupang kingdom.

The Dutch, like the Portuguese in the eastern part of the island, had problems financing their colony. The captain of the Portuguese corvette Sa de Bandeira reported from his visit in 1869 that the Dutch could not return his 21-gun salute because they lacked guns and soldiers. The Portuguese captain saw this as an example of the Dutch way of "economic administration". In 1875, the German expedition ship SMS Gazelle visited Kupang on its circumnavigation of the world. Extensive studies of the surrounding area were carried out.

=== 20th century ===
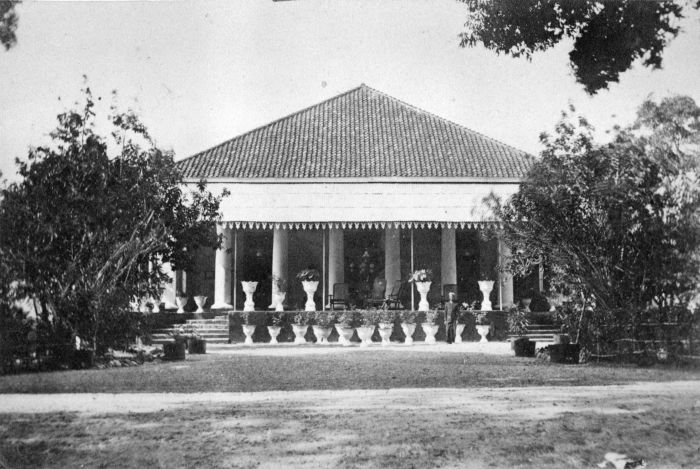
House of the Dutch Resident in Kupang (c. 1900).

By the 20th century, West Timor had the status of resident within the Dutch East Indies to easen administration. The lack of power of the Dutch in West Timor can be seen in the fact that in 1904 they could only force an official audience with the ruler of Wehale in his capital Laran by military force. It was the first ever direct meeting of Dutch representatives with the "Emperor" (Keizer).

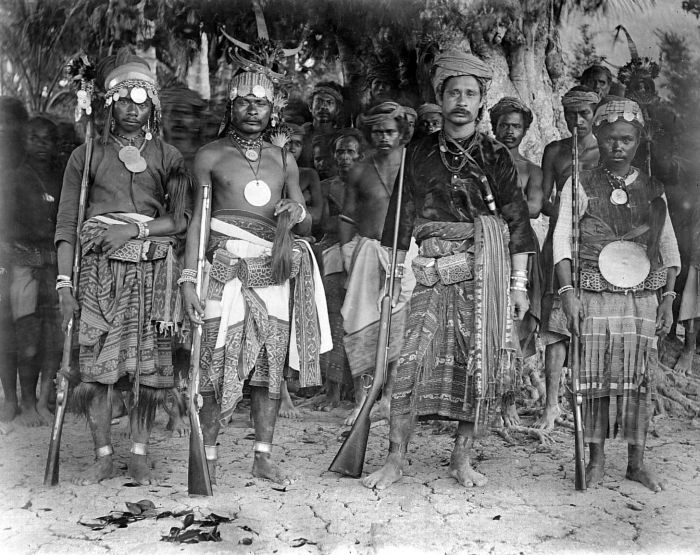
Molo chief of Amarasi with delegation visiting Dutch representative in Babau.

In 1905, the Dutch wanted to finally bring the Timorese rulers of their colony under their control. The Liurai (or Raja) were asked to swear an oath to the Netherlands and transfer their authority to the Dutch administrator. In return, they were to be granted some autonomy in their realms. The Liurai were to take over tax collection for the Dutch. The result was the outbreak of rebellions throughout West Timor from 1906 onwards. The reaction of the Dutch came quickly. In Niki-Niki, the local Liurai and his family were encircled by Dutch troops, causing them to commit suicide. The rebellions continued until 1916, when the rulers of West Timor had to accept the Dutch as their new masters.

In the 1920s and 1930s, the first political organisations of the indigenous population emerged, such as the Timorsch Verbond in 1922, the Timor Evolutie in 1924, and the Pesekutan Timor in 1926. In 1933, Timorese students formed the Timorese Jongeren in Bandung, one of its members was the infamous bomb maker and national hero, Herman Johannes. This development ran counter to that in Portuguese East Timor, where the dictatorship suppressed political work. The Perserikatan Nasional Indonesia (PNI) also began to gain influence in West Timor and the Communist Party of Indonesia (PKI) opened a branch in Kupang in 1925. There it demanded a reduction in taxes and an end to forced labour, which led to the imprisonment and exile of its leader Christian Pandie.

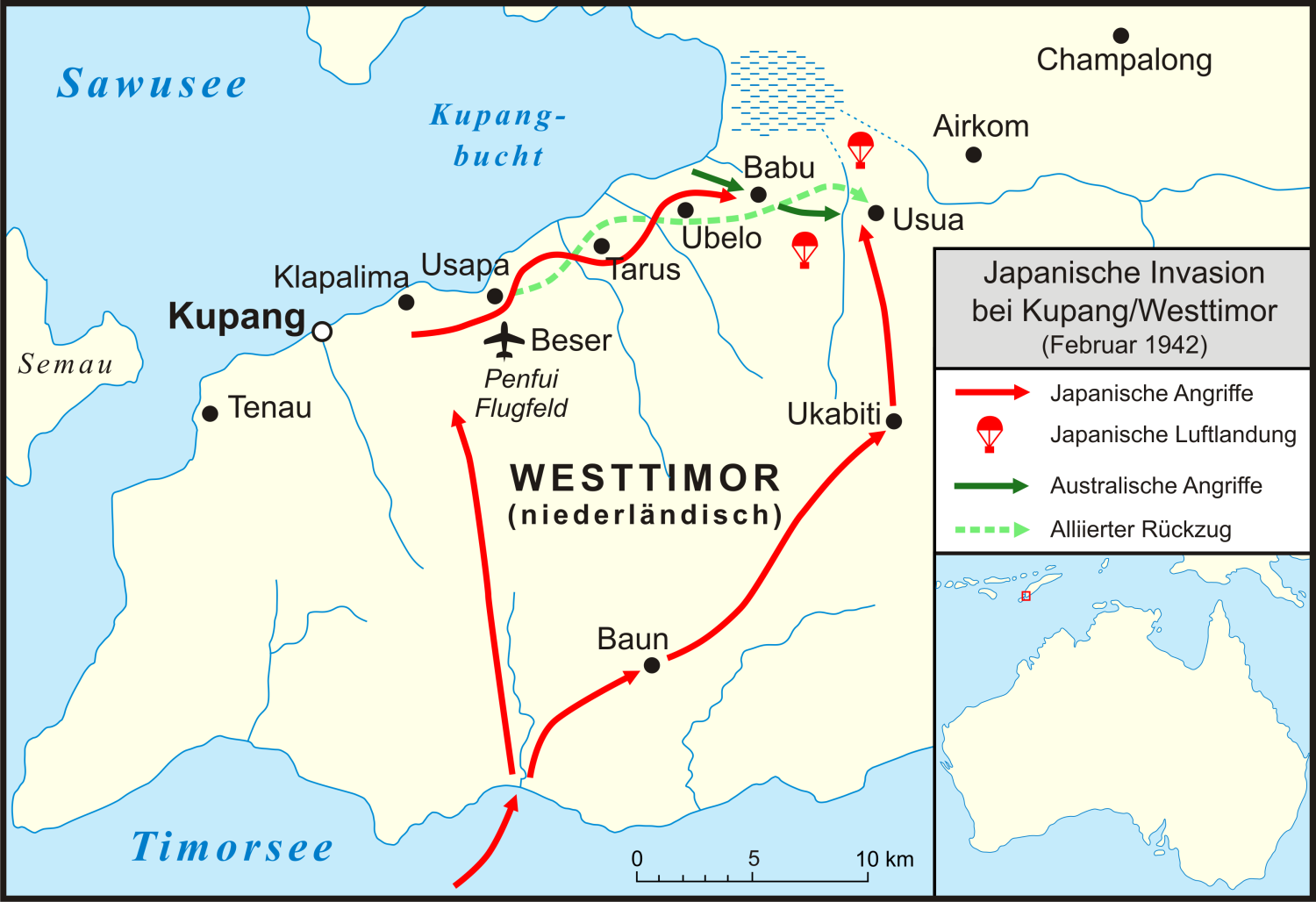
Japanese Invasion of Kupang (1942)

During the Second World War, Timor was occupied by the Japanese Imperial army. On the night of 19‒20 February 1942, Japanese units landed at Kupang and brought almost all of West Timor under their control by the end of the month during the Battle of Timor. The Japanese did not officially surrender in West Timor until 11 September 1945 at a ceremony on the Australian HMAS Moresby. Upon Indonesian independence, West Timor became part of the new Republic of Indonesia.

For barely a year, the Permesta movement, originating from Sulawesi, had Indonesian West Timor under its control. The movement, allegedly supported by the CIA, fought against the central government in Jakarta until it was defeated by Indonesian troops in March 1958. 14 members of Permesta managed to escape to the Portuguese exclave of Oe-Cusse Ambeno. They are said to have been responsible for the Viqueque rebellion in Portuguese Timor in 1959.

Local administration remained in the hands of the Liurai until 1958. Despite their later removal from power, their families still have great influence in West Timorese society. Since 1988, there have been increased efforts to develop the region.

West Timor was a refugee shelter from 1998 to 2002, due to the prolonged East Timor conflict. On 6 September 2000, Pero Simundza from Croatia, Carlos Caceres-Collazio from Puerto Rico and Samson Aregahegn from Ethiopia – all UNHCR staff members – were killed in an attack by 5,000 members of a pro-Indonesian militia, armed with machetes, on the office of UNHCR in the town of Atambua, which is in the vicinity of the border with Timor-Leste and where the main refugee camp was located

== Geography ==
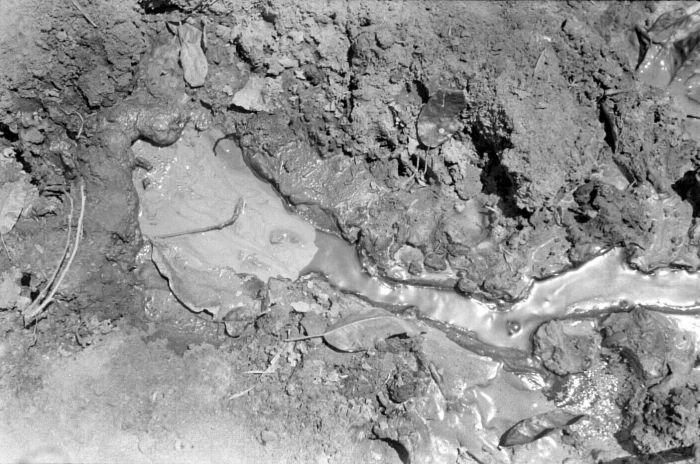
Mud volcano in the Mutis Mountains (1937)

West Timor is an Indonesian region that comprises the western half of Timor island (with the exception of Oecusse district, which is politically part of the nation of Timor-Leste) and forms a part of the Indonesian province of East Nusa Tenggara. Most of West Timor belongs to the Indonesian province of East Nusa Tenggara with its capital city of Kupang on the western tip of Timor. The Indonesian western part of the island, with an area of 14,513 km^{2}, is divided into the city of Kupang (the chief port and largest town in West Timor, and the capital of Nusa Tenggara Timur province.) and the governmental regencies (kabupaten) of Belu (capital: Atambua), Kupang (including the offshore island of Semau; capital: Kupang), South Central Timor (Timor Tengah Selatan; capital: Soe) and North Central Timor (Timor Tengah Utara; capital: Kefamenanu). On 14 December 2012, the southern half of Belu Regency became an additional administrative regency of Malaka (capital: Betun).

The area of Oecusse Ambeno on the north coast with 817 km^{2} is part of the nation of Timor-Leste. The capital of the special administrative region is Pante Macassar.

West Timor owes its present appearance to an extremely eventful geological past, the special characteristic of which is large differences in altitude within short distances. More than 60% of the surface of West Timor consists of largely rugged low mountain ranges. Numerous rivers and streams draining the mountainous areas and plateaus have carved deep, V-shaped valleys into the mountainous landscape. The highest point of West Timor is Mount Mutis, at 2,427 metres (7,963 ft).

West Timor lies between Australia and Timor-Leste which makes the island a strategic place for Indonesian trade.

=== Climate ===
West Timor is no exception to the general climate of the Malay archipelago: the western part of the island of Timor has the characteristic monsoon climate. Thus, Timor also shows the familiar picture of Indonesia: the west monsoon in one half of the year, the east monsoon in the other. The west monsoon is a time of heavy, cloudburst rainfall in the months of October to May, the east monsoon a time of extreme dryness during the rest of the year, thus West Timor has large and wide-ranging savannas, and has fairly dry air temperatures, with minimal rainfall In the rainy season. When downpours happen, these rivers briefly become wild, raging torrents of water, which then cause major traffic and communication problems. In the past, these isolated plateaus and mountain landscapes favoured the emergence of politically relatively autonomous territories.

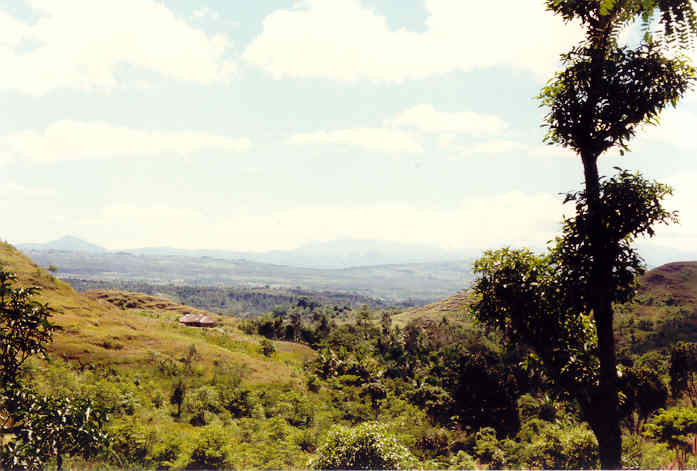
Rainy season at Soe (1990)

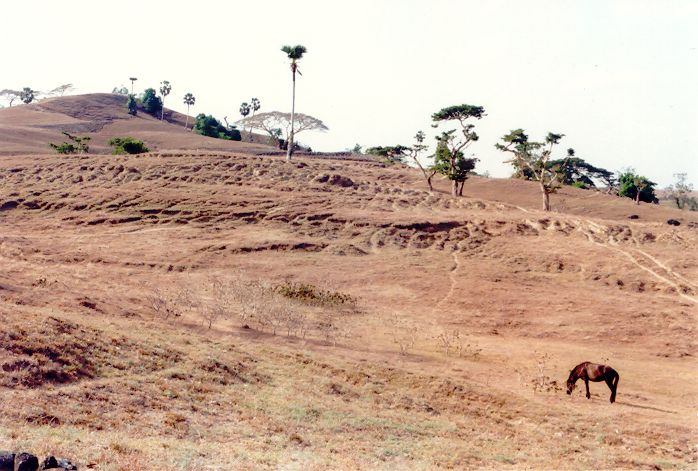
Dry season in Fatu Le`u (1991)

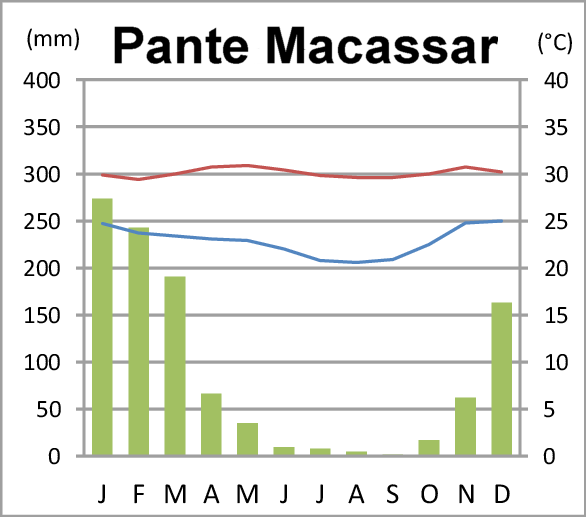
Climate diagram of East Timor's Pante Macassar (Oe-Cusse Ambeno exclave)

== Administration ==
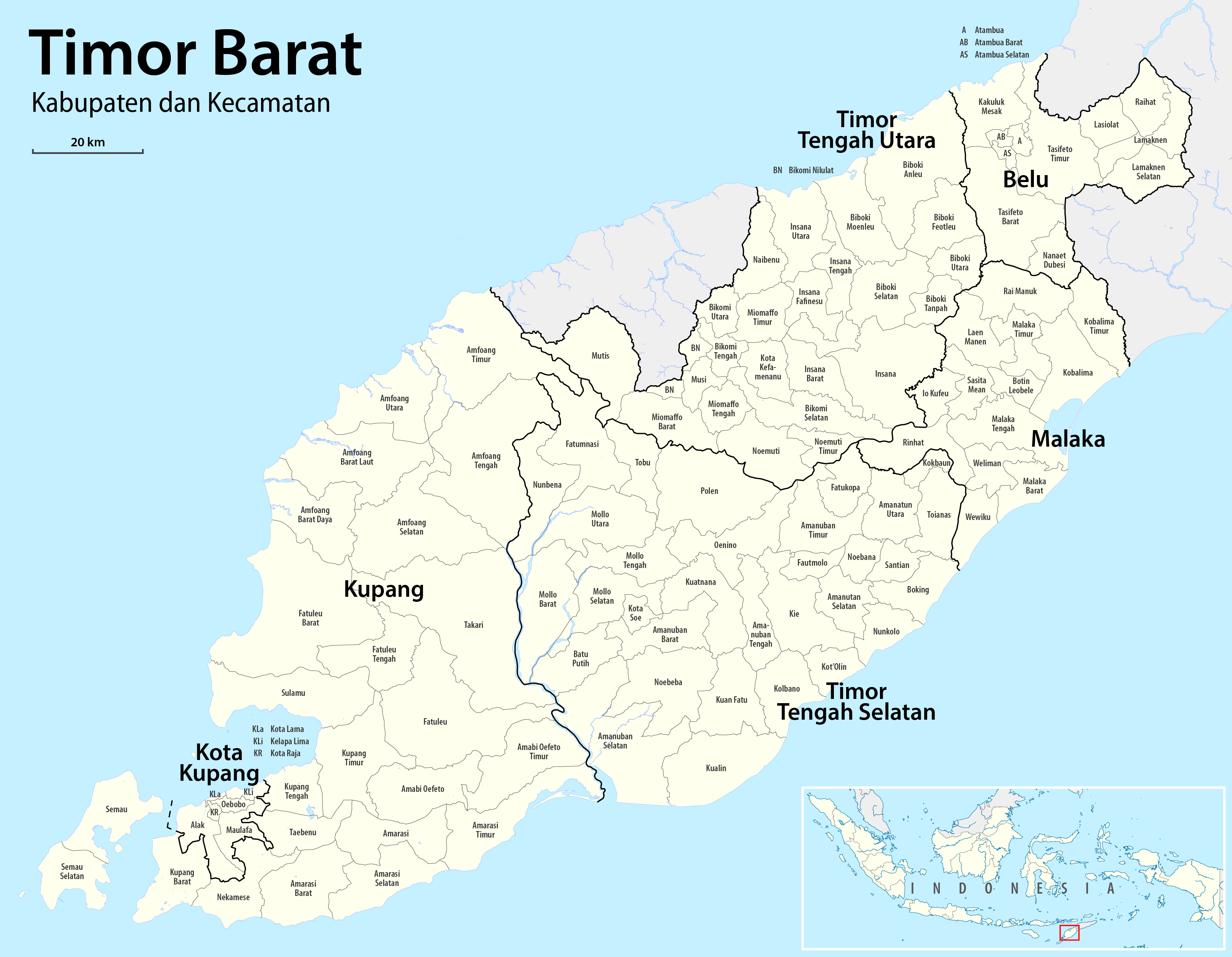
Administrative divisions of Indonesian West Timor

West Timor is part of the East Nusa Tenggara province. It was formerly split into the City of Kupang (a kabupaten or regency-level administrative area) and four regencies (kabupaten); from west to east these are: City of Kupang, Kupang, Timor Tengah Selatan (South Central Timor), Timor Tengah Utara (North Central Timor) and Belu. However, a fifth regency – Malaka – was in December 2012 formed from the southern half of Belu Regency. Note the administrative area has shrunk as Rote Ndao Regency (Rote and Ndao islands to the southwest) and Sabu Raijua Regency (the Savu Islands further west) were split off in 2002 and 2009 respectively from Kupang Regency. West Timor accounts for 35.5% of the provincial population.

Kode Wilayah	Name of city or regency	Statute (including year established)	Area in km^{2}	Pop'n 2010 census	Pop'n 2020 census	Pop'n mid 2024 estimate	Capital	HDI 2022 estimate
53.71	Kupang City		180.27	336,239	442,758	474,801	Kupang	0.8020 (Very High)
53.01	Kupang Regency	UU 69/1958	5,298.13	304,548	366,383	390,210	Oelamasi	0.6504 (Medium)
53.02	South Central Timor Regency (Timor Tengah Selatan)	UU 69/1958	3,955.36	441,155	455,410	490,642	Soe	0.6273 (Medium)
53.03	North Central Timor Regency (Timor Tengah Utara)	UU 69/1958	2,669.70	229,803	259,829	275,439	Kefamenanu	0.6426 (Medium)
53.04	Belu Regency	UU 69/1958	1,248.94	188,163	217,973	235,709	Atambua	0.6322 (Medium)
53.21	Malaka Regency	UU 3/2013	1,160.63	164,134	183,898	193,510	Betun	0.6134 (Medium)
	West Timor		14,513.03	1,664,042	1,926,251	2,060,311		

== Demographics ==
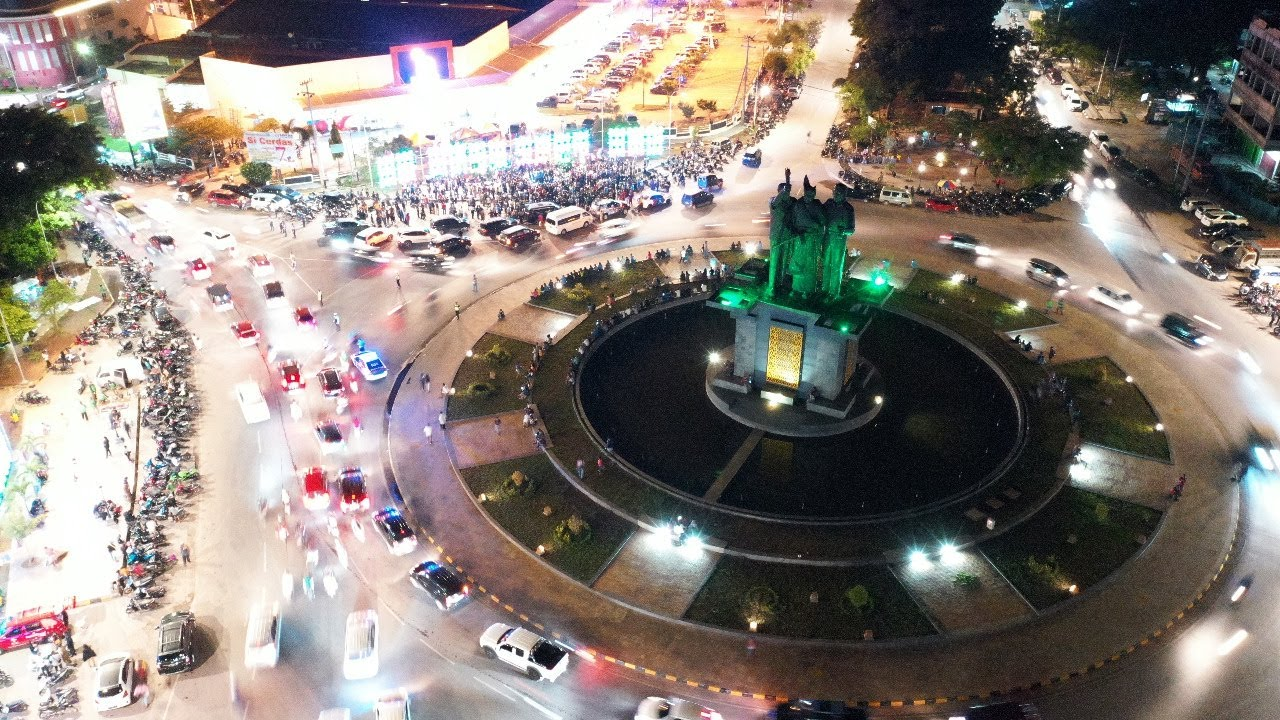
Night view of Kupang City

The population in this region is diverse, consisting of various tribes and ethnicities that have different cultures and languages. The main tribe in West Timor is the Atoni tribe, which is the indigenous population, but there are also immigrant tribes such as the Timorese, Rote, and several others who come from various islands in Nusa Tenggara.

According to the latest data, the population of West Timor is around 2 million, with the population center in Kupang City, which is also the capital of East Nusa Tenggara province. The population of West Timor is mostly farmers, ranchers, fishermen, and traders. However, urbanization has caused many people to move to cities to find work in the service and industrial sectors.

In addition to ethnic factors, religion also plays an important role in the composition of society in West Timor. The majority of the population is Protestant Christian, but there are also significant Muslim and Catholic communities.

West Timor's geographical location adjacent to Timor Leste, a former Portuguese colony, means it has a long history of political, economic and social ties to the region.

=== Languages ===
Languages of Timor

Dialects of Uab Meto according to Edwards (2020)

In addition to the national language, Indonesian, native languages belonging to the Fabronic Stock of the Austronesian group of languages (subgroup East Indonesian of the West Austronesian branch) are spoken in West Timor, the others in East Timor. These languages include Uab Meto, Tetum, Ndaonese, Rotinese and Helong. Whilst languages of a non-Indonesian type (especially in the east), which are generally categorised as Papuan languages. Uab Meto, the language of the Atoin Meto, belongs to the West Austronesian languages, as do Tetum and Kemak, while Bunak is categorised as a Papuan language.

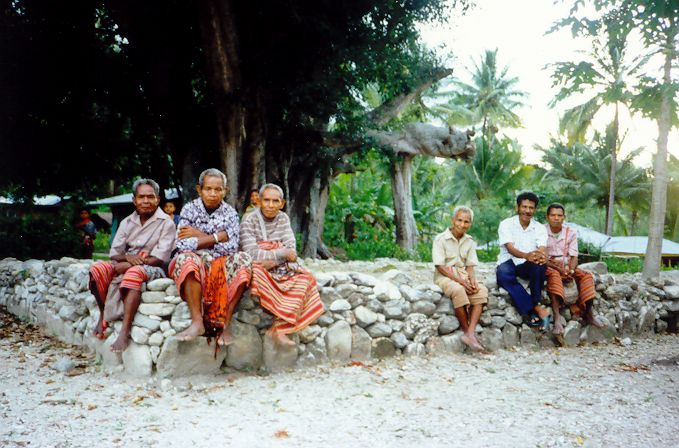
Everyday and ritual clothing of the Atoin Meto in Kuan Fatu (South Amanuban) 1992

The Atoin Meto (Atoni) form the dominant population of West Timor. The name Atoin Meto means native or indigenous (indigenous) people (atoni, human; meto, internal to the culture, native, therefore not foreign). There are also ethnic names such as Atoni Pah Meto, the "people of the dry land", a choice of name that refers to the settlement area, or simply Meto. In literature, the derogatory foreign names Dawan, Orang Gunung (mountain people) or Timorese can be found, which can lead to confusion with the inhabitants of independent Timor-Leste. They live in the lower mountainous regions of the hinterland, where they prefer altitudes between 500 m and 1000 m for agricultural reasons, and populate the whole of West Timor, with the exception of the government districts of Belu and Malaka on the border with neighbouring East Timor. The Tetum, Bunak and Kemak ethnic groups, the majority of whom otherwise live in East Timor, mainly settle here. The various groups are linked by a wealth of economic and social ties.

In addition, the languages Helong and Rotinese, which are related to the Atoin Meto language, are spoken in the west of the island. Helong was the original language in Kupang, but has been largely replaced by Bahasa Indonesia and is only spoken in a few villages south of the city along the east coast and on Semau Island. Rotinese, the language from the island of Roti, is split into many dialects. Rotinese can be found in many regions of West Timor due to the resettlement programme carried out by the Dutch in the 19th century.

Knowledge of Dutch (the colonial language) is now limited to the older generations.

=== Religion ===
Religion in West Timor (2023)
1. Protestantism (54.1%)
2. Roman Catholic (40.7%)
3. Islam (5.03%)
4. Hinduism (0.16%)
5. Buddhism (0.01%)
6. Others (0.01%)

West Timor is one of the areas in Indonesia that is mainly Christian. Similar to Timor-Leste, Christianity is the religion of the overwhelming majority (94.8%) of the people of West Timor, 54.1% being Protestant and 40.7% being Catholic. Islam is followed by 5%. The remaining 0.2% includes Hindus and Buddhists.

Originally, the Timorese were animists. The influence of Islam, which spread throughout South East Asia from the 15th century, did not reach Timor. The first Dominicans settled in 1556 and founded the Lifau (Lifao). The Dominican António Taveira promoted the missionisation of Timor. In the late 16th century, he focussed on the kingdoms on the north and south coasts. By 1640, a handful of priests had already founded 10 missions and 22 churches on Timor. However, a minority remained who were converted to Christianity. Ancestor worship and belief in spirits remained widespread.

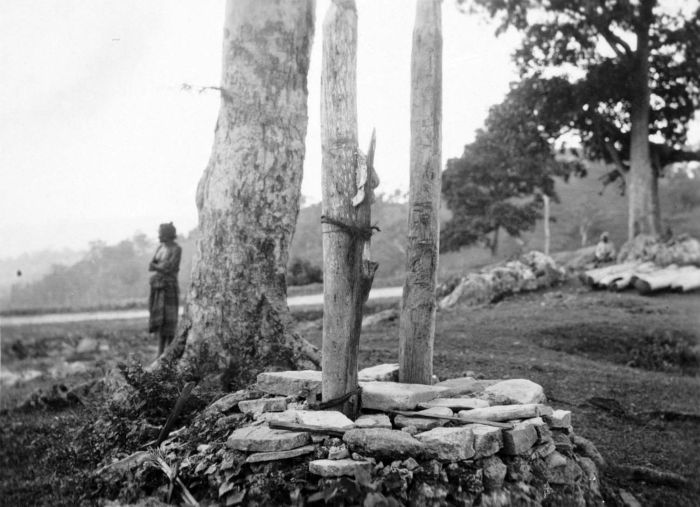
Animistic sacrificial place in Niki-Niki, 1928/29

It was not until the middle of the 19th century that a large-scale Catholic missionary programme began among the locals, although it was not until the early 20th century that it began to bear fruit with the conversion of 16 local princes. Protestant missionaries later followed to West Timor. Today, around 95% of the inhabitants of West Timor are Christians (54% Protestant, and 41% Catholic), 5% are Muslims. The number of practising Christians is very high, at around 80 to 85 per cent. However, a 2001 survey revealed that more than 70 per cent of the population is still rooted in both ancestor worship and belief in spirits.

In the east of West Timor (Belu, Malaka and North Central Timor Regency), the proportion of Catholics is significantly higher. For example, 96.5% of the almost 500,000 people in the diocese of Atambua are Catholic. From the Catholic missionary Apostolic Vicariate of Dutch Timor stem the Metropolitan Archdiocese of Kupang and its suffragan Diocese of Atambua. Oe-Cusse Ambeno belongs to the East Timorese archdiocese of Dili.

== Economy ==
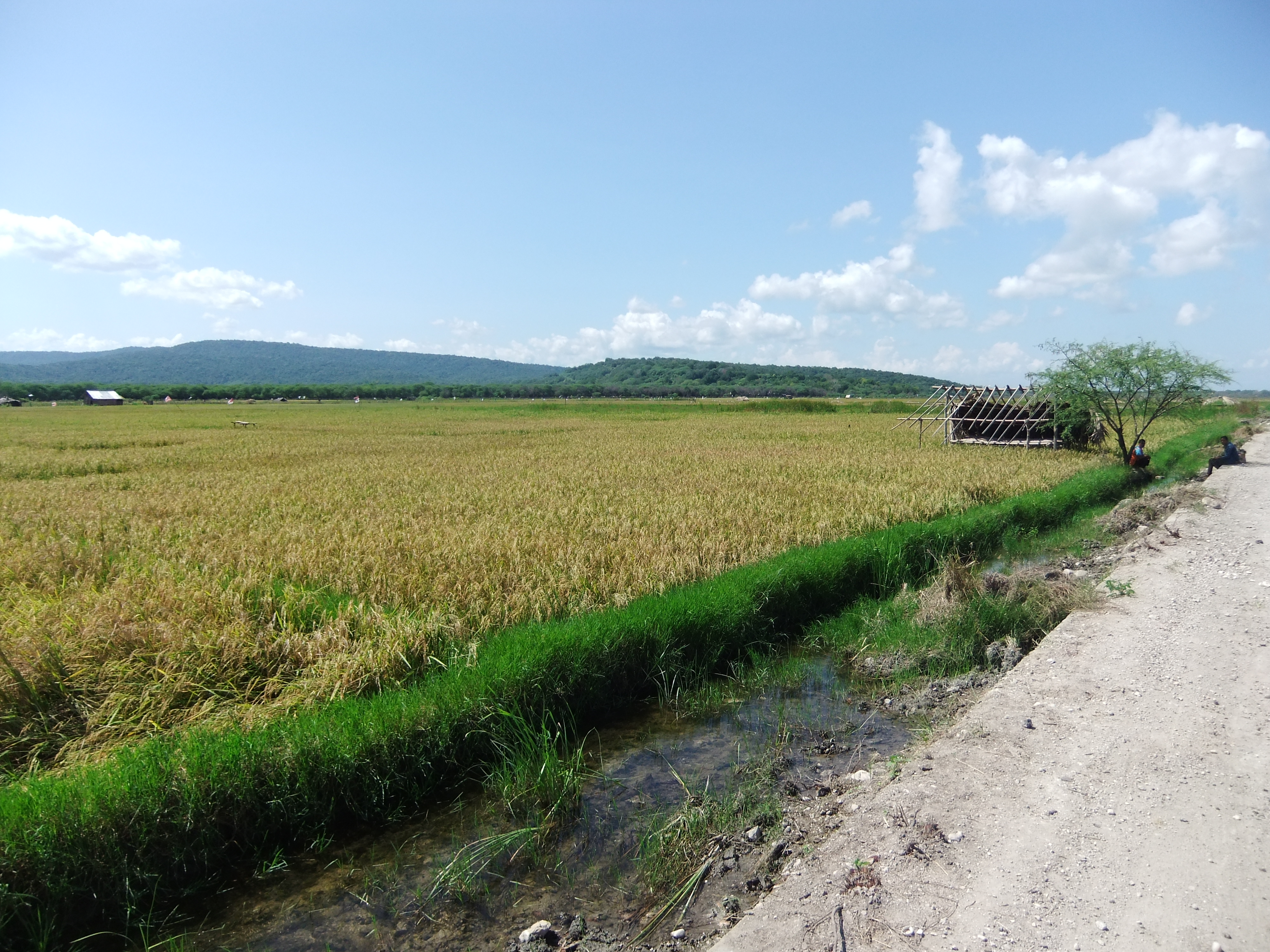
An arid ricefield in South Central Timor Regency

The alternation of dry and rainy seasons shapes the agricultural rhythm and social life of the widely dispersed farming communities of the populations of West Timor. West Timor has an average unemployment rate of 2.39%. 30% of the population lived below the poverty line in 1998; as of 2012, it remained at 30%. The economy is mainly agricultural, using slash-and-burn methods to produce corn, rice, coffee, copra and fruit. Some timber harvesting is undertaken, producing eucalyptus, sandalwood, teak, bamboo and rosewood. An essential factor for the agriculture of these crops is the relationship between the duration and amount of rainfall, i.e. the duration of the drought is decisive for the cultivation of food crops; depending on the region, this can last up to nine months per year. For this reason, the most significant risk factor for agriculture is a lack of continuity in rainfall: Agriculture is a competition with the behaviour of the monsoon.
