= Mount Mutis =

Mountain in Timor, Indonesia

- Nuaf Nefomasi
- Location within Indonesia

Highest point
- Elevation: 2,417 m (7,930 ft)
- Prominence: 1,970 m (6,460 ft)
- Listing: Ultras; Ribu
- Coordinates: 9°34′S 124°14′E

Geography
- Location: West Timor, East Nusa Tenggara, Indonesia

Mount Mutis (Indonesian: Gunung Mutis), also known as Nuaf Nefomasi, is a mountain and the highest point of East Nusa Tenggara, Indonesia, at 2,417 metres (7,930 ft) above sea level. It is located in the Gunung Mutis Nature Reserve in the South Central Timor Regency, 150 km (93 mi) from Kupang City, around 40 km (25 mi) north of the town of Soe. The mountain is a popular climbing site.

The Dawan people believe that the Almighty, who gives rain, wing, and life, resides on Mount Mutis. Amongst local groups living in the area near Mt Mutis there is some concern that the development of local resources by mining and timber companies is doing environmental damage in the region. The area around Mt Mutis is an Indonesian national park of approximately 12,000 ha in size. Environmental management is a major concern for the managers of the park.

== Geography ==
The summit of Nuaf Nefomasi is located on the border between North Central Timor Regency and South Central Timor Regency.

== See also ==
- List of ultras of the Malay Archipelago
