= North Central Timor Regency =

Regency in East Nusa Tenggara, Indonesia

North Central Timor Regency Kabupaten Timor Tengah Utara
- Regency
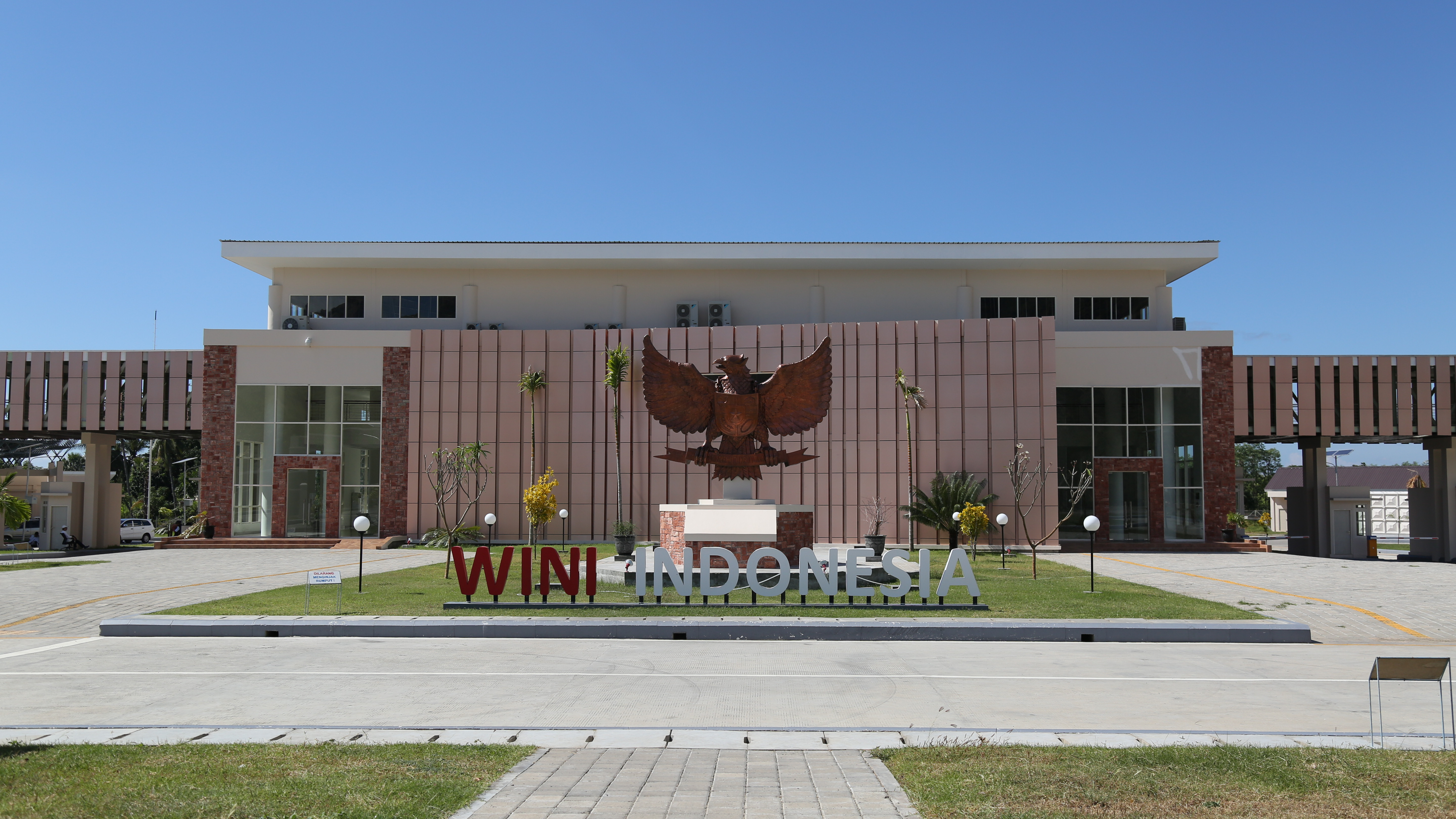
- Wini Border post

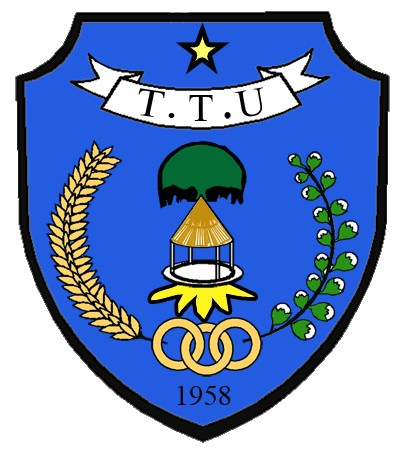
- Coat of arms

- Location within East Nusa Tenggara

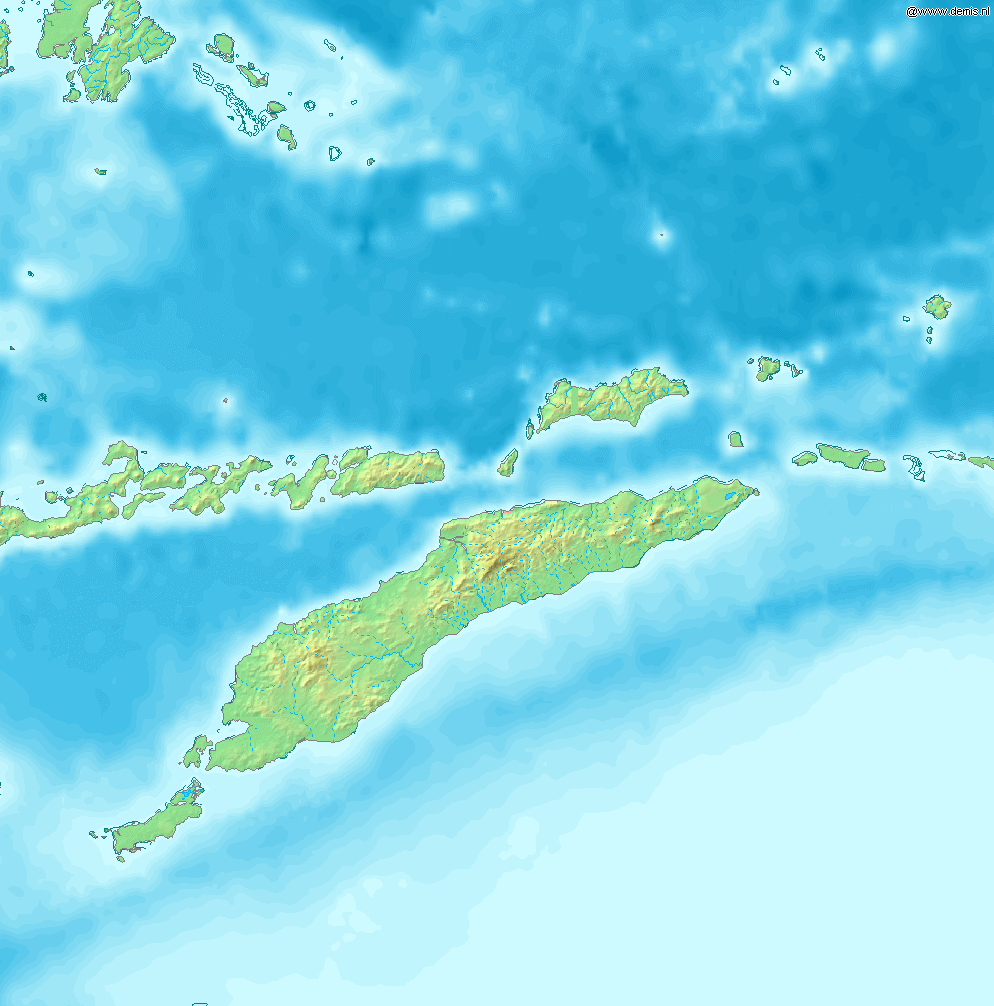
- Location in Timor, Lesser Sunda Islands and Indonesia North Central Timor Regency (Lesser Sunda Islands) North Central Timor Regency (Indonesia)
- Coordinates: 9°26′48″S 124°28′41″E
- Country: Indonesia
- Province: East Nusa Tenggara
- Regency seat: Kefamenanu

Government
  - Regent: Yosep Falentinus Delasalle Kebo
  - Vice Regent: Kamillus Elu

Area
  - Total: 2,669.70 km^{2} (1,030.78 sq mi)

Population (mid 2025 estimate)
  - Total: 279,637
  - Density: 104.745/km^{2} (271.288/sq mi)
- Area code: (+62) 388
- HDI (2019): ▲0.633 (Medium)
- Website: ttukab.go.id

North Central Timor Regency (Indonesian: Kabupaten Timor Tengah Utara) is a regency in East Nusa Tenggara Province, Indonesia. It covers an area of 2,669.70 km^{2}, and had a population of 229,803 at the 2010 Census and 259,829 at the 2020 Census; the official estimate as of mid-2025 was 279,637 (comprising 140,357 males and 139,280 females). Its regency seat is located at the town of Kefamenanu, which had a population of 50,249 in mid 2024. The regency borders Timor Leste's Oecusse exclave, and thus is one of few Indonesian regions that have a land border with other countries.

== History ==
North Central Timor Regency was de jure formed on 9 August 1958 from three autonomous royal regions (swapraja) but de facto function only began early November 1958 after its first regent was sworn in. Since 1915, the region had been part of Onderafdeeling Noord Miden Timor during Dutch rule; it was composed of the native kingdoms of Miomaffo, Insana, and Biboki. In 1921, the administrative seat was moved from the town of Noeltoko to its current location in Kefemenanu; the move is annually commemorated by the local government since 2005.

In 1942, the Japanese forces occupied the Dutch East Indies. Local government structure changed little under the Japanese, who mostly preserved it to simplify civil administration. In 1946, after the end of the Second World War, during the Malino Conference, the region's local rulers wanted to be included in Lesser Sunda province, together with Bali and West Nusa Tenggara, under the newly formed Indonesian Republic. Local administration was reorganized in 1949 after independence, and formed its own parliament under Timor Regional Law Number 10 of 1949. In a parliament session between 10 and 12 May 1950, it voted in favour of disbanding the State of East Indonesia under the United States of Indonesia and forming a unitary Indonesian state, which was realized not long after. Shortly before the creation of the regency, Lesser Sunda province was split into West Nusa Tenggara, Bali, and East Nusa Tenggara provinces.

During the Indonesian occupation of East Timor and the subsequent independence referendum and violence that followed, many civilians from East Timor fled to the regency, causing a huge increase in the population. Many were integrated into the regency's society to the point they constituted 8.1% of the regency's population. The regency was devastated by Cyclone Seroja in early 2021, prompting the relocation of several settlements and buildings by Indonesian government.

== Geography ==
North Central Timor Regency borders South Central Timor Regency in the south, the country of East Timor in the northwest, the coast of the Sawu Sea in the north, Kupang Regency in the west, and Belu Regency in the east. It has a total area of 2,669.70 km^{2} (1,030.78 sq mi) or 5.6% of the province's area. Most of the regency has slopes below 40 degrees, consisting of 77.4%. Most of the regency is less than 500 meters (1,600 ft) above sea level. Around 74%, 97,948 hectares (378.18 sq mi) of the regency's area is used for plantation and agriculture, and only 20,685 hectares (79.87 sq mi) are used for human settlement.

Most of the regency's soil is litosol and grumusol, and is relatively fertile. The region's climate is classified as semi-arid, which makes large-scale farming challenging due to low precipitation compared to other regions in Indonesia. To solve this, the government of Indonesia has built several new dams in the region to avoid drought and secure access to water for its population.

The temperature ranges from 22–34 degrees Celsius (71.6–93.2 °F), with air humidity level between 69 and 87% annually. Between June and September, wind comes from Australia, bringing little water vapor to the region, and the dry season begins. The region is prone to drought and harvest failure.

== Demographics ==
Of the population in mid 2025, 80,943 (28.95%) were below the age of 15, and 198,694 were aged 15 and above; of the latter, 178,373 (63.79%) were of working age and 20,321 (7.27%) were aged 65 and above.

== Governance ==
=== Administrative districts ===
The regency is divided into twenty-four districts (kecamatan), tabulated below with their areas and their populations at the 2010 Census and the 2020 Census, together with the official estimates as of mid-2025. The districts are grouped below into three geographical sectors (which have no administrative significance), plus the regency capital, Kota Kefamenanu. The table also includes the locations of the district administrative centres, the number of administrative villages in each district (in total, 160 rural desa and 33 urban kelurahan), and its post code.

Kode Wilayah	Name of District (kecamatan)	Area in km^{2}	Pop'n Census 2010	Pop'n Census 2020	Pop'n Estimate mid 2025	Admin centre	No. of villages	Post codes
53.03.02	Miomaffo Barat (West Miomaffo)	199.63	14,424	15,337	16,012	Eban	13 ^{(a)}	85661
53.03.11	Miomaffo Tengah (Central Miomaffo)	75.00	5,251	6,081	6,619	Bijaepasu	6	85660
53.03.12	Musi	82.17	4,070	4,740	5,173	Oeolo	6	85662
53.03.13	Mutis ^{(b)}	90.50	6,576	7,150	7,546	Naekake	4	85663
53.03.01	Miomaffo Timur (East Miomaffo)	101.45	10,560	12,417	13,616	Nunpene	11 ^{(c)}	85654
53.03.04	Noemuti	155.60	10,926	12,743	13,918	Fatumuti	12 ^{(d)}	85664
53.03.14	Bikomi Selatan (South Bikomi)	48.68	9,786	11,188	12,102	Tublopo	10 ^{(e)}	85650
53.03.15	Bikomi Tengah (Central Bikomi)	61.50	6,749	7,613	8,181	Oenenu Utara	9	85652
53.03.16	Bikomi Nilulat	82.00	4,298	4,800	5,133	Sunkaen	6	85651
53.03.17	Bikomi Utara (North Bikomi)	70.70	5,564	6,252	6,705	Napan	9	85653
53.03.18	Naibenu	88.00	4,958	5,576	5,983	Bakitolas	4	85655
53.03.10	Noemuti Timur (East Noemuti)	55.77	3,708	4,270	4,635	Haekto	4	85665
Totals	Miomaffo & Bikomi Sector	1,111.00	86,870	98,167	105,623		94	
53.03.05	Kota Kefamenanu (Kefamenanu town)	74.00	43,058	49,095	50,917	Sasi	9 ^{(f)}	85611: 85617
Totals	Town Sector	74.00	43,058	49,095	50,917		9	
53.03.08	Insana	333.08	18,078	20,996	22,885	Oelolok	17 ^{(g)}	85671
53.03.09	Insana Utara (North Insana)	53.84	8,697	10,166	11,115	Wini	5 ^{(h)}	85674
53.03.20	Insana Barat (West Insana)	102.00	8,879	10,660	11,808	Mamsena	12 ^{(i)}	85670
53.03.21	Insana Tengah (Central Insana)	124.00	9,171	10,491	11,350	Maubesi	7 ^{(j)}	85673
53.03.19	Insana Fafinesu	52.88	4,968	5,898	6,498	Loel	6	85672
Totals	Insana Sector	665.80	49,793	58,211	63,656		47	
53.03.03	Biboki Selatan (South Biboki)	164.17	8,667	9,393	9,898	Manufui	8 ^{(k)}	85680
53.03.22	Biboki Tanpah	99.15	5,334	5,620	5,841	Oenopu	4	85684
53.03.23	Biboki Moenleu	85.78	7,034	8,021	8,665	Kaubele	7	85681
53.03.06	Biboki Utara (North Biboki)	138.70	10,255	11,269	11,956	Lurasik	10 ^{(m)}	85683
53.03.07	Biboki Anleu	206.40	14,846	17,128	18,609	Ponu	9 ^{(n)}	85613
53.03.24	Biboki Feotleu	124.70	3,946	4,254	4,472	Manumean	5	85682
Totals	Biboki Sector	818.90	50,082	55,685	59,441		43	
Totals for	Regency	2,669.70	229,803	259,829	279,637	Kefamenanu	193	

Notes: (a) including two kelurahan - Eban and Sallu. (b) Mutis District forms a geographical salient from the rest of the Regency, bordering on the Oecusse exclave of Timor Leste to the north and east, and Kupang Regency and South Central Timor Regency to the west and southwest, with only a short connection to the rest of North Central Timor Regency to the southeast, through West Miomaffo District; it includes Mount Mutis (2,127m), the highest peak in Timor.
(c) including two kelurahan - Bitefa and Oesena. (d) comprising five kelurahan (Fatumuti, Kiuola, Oenak, Nifuboke and Noemuti) and seven desa. (e) including two kelurahan - Oelami and Tublopo.
(f) all nine are kelurahan (Aplasi, Bansone, Benpasi, Kefamenanu Selatan, Kefamenanu Tengah, Kefamenanu Utara, Maubeli, Sasi and Tubuhue).
(g) comprising five kelurahan (Ainiut, Bitauni, Fatoin, Manunain A and Nunmafo) and twelve desa. (h) including one kelurahan - Humusu C.
(i) including one kelurahan - Atmen. (j) including one kelurahan - Maubesi. (k) including two kelurahan - Supun Up and Faon.
(m) including two kelurahan - Boronubaen and Boronubaen Timur. (n) including one kelurahan - Ponu.

=== Local government ===
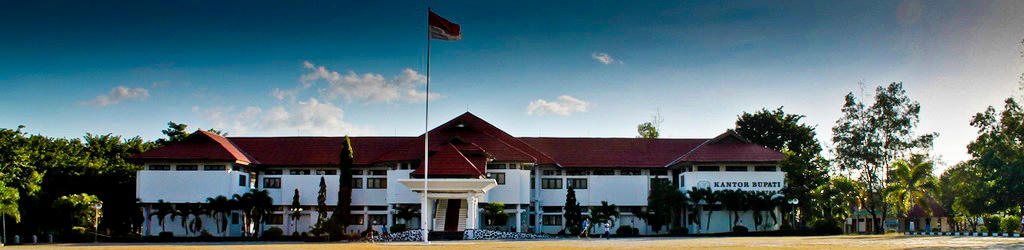
Regent office of North Central Timor

North Central Timor Regency is a second-level administrative division equivalent to a city. The regency is headed by a regent, who is democratically elected. The regent directly appoints heads of districts with the recommendation of the regency secretary. Executive power lies with the regent and vice-regent, and legislative function is exercised by the regency's parliament.

=== Politics ===
North Central Timor Regency, together with Belu Regency and Malaka Regency, which have 8 out of 65 representatives, is part of 7th electoral district in the provincial parliament. The regency's parliament consists of 30 representatives from four electoral districts. The most recent elections were held in 2024 and the next are due to be held in 2029. In 2024, the National Democrat Party (PND) and Golkar (Partai Golongan Karya) each won 5 seats, the PKB, Gerindra and the PDI-P each won 4 seats, and 8 seats were won by smaller groups.

Electoral district	Kecamatan	Representatives
1st North Central Timor	Bikomi Nilulat, South Bikomi, Naibenu, East Miomaffo, North Bikomi, Central Bikomi, and Kota Kefamenanu Districts	11
2nd North Central Timor	Insana, West Insana, Insana Fafinesu, Central Insana, and North Insana Districts	7
3rd North Central Timor	Biboki Anleu, Biboki Feotleu, Biboki Moenleu, South Biboki, Biboki Tanpah, and North Biboki Districts	6
4th North Central Timor	Central Miomaffo, West Miomaffo, Musi, Mutis, Noemuti, and East Noemuti Districts	6
Total		30

== Economy ==
The Regency's gross regional product (GRP) is dominated by agriculture, which makes up 39.82% of its economy. The second-biggest sector is administration with 16.77%, followed by construction with 9.55% and education with 7.41%. In 2020, the fastest-growing sector was electricity and gas, with a growth of 18.10%, followed by information and communication with 14.97%; the fastest-declining sector is mining with a decrease of 28.98% in the same year. Economic growth was 5.1% in 2019 but later fell to -0.55% because of COVID-19 pandemic. The regency has 32 registered market centers and 80 registered stores. From the scale, there are 123 trading facilities that area considered to facilitate large-scale trading by Indonesian Statistics. There were 62 active cooperatives as of 2020.

Almost all of the regency's restaurants and hotels are located in Kefamenanu. As of 2020, there are 137 registered restaurants, of which 114 or 83% are located in Kefamenanu, and 11 hotels. In 2020, agriculture output included red onions (36 tons), garlic (30.3 tons), red chilli (18.7 tons), cabbages (41.2 tons), mustard greens (235.5 tons), and asparagus (16.9 tons). Other crops were coconuts (555 tons), cashews (913 tons), and candlenuts (1,655 tons) in the same year. The regency's livestock in 2020 includes 129,325 cows for meat consumption and 82,126 pigs. The fish catch was 748.3 tons and aquaculture yielded 162.4 tons of fish.

== Demographics ==
In the 2020 census, the population of the regency was 259,829, with a sex ratio of 100.53, which means there are roughly 101 males per 100 females within the population. As with most of Indonesia, the regency's population is young and dominated by a workforce above 15 years, consisting of 141,985 of the population. The most populous district is Kefamenanu, which had 49,095 people in mid 2022, around 18.3% of the regency's population; the town is also the economic center for the regency. West Miomaffo District has the lowest male–female sex ratio with 0.95:1, and the highest is Biboki Feotleu with 1.43:1.

In 2020, Catholic Christians comprised 90.13% of the population; 7.47% were Protestant Christians, and the remainder were Muslims, Hindus, and Buddhists. The literacy rate was 95.21% in 2020; male literacy was 96.11% and female literacy was 94.35%. The school participation rate was 98.87%. The same year, the regency's poverty rate of 22.28% was high relative to other regions in Indonesia.

== Infrastructure ==
=== Education ===
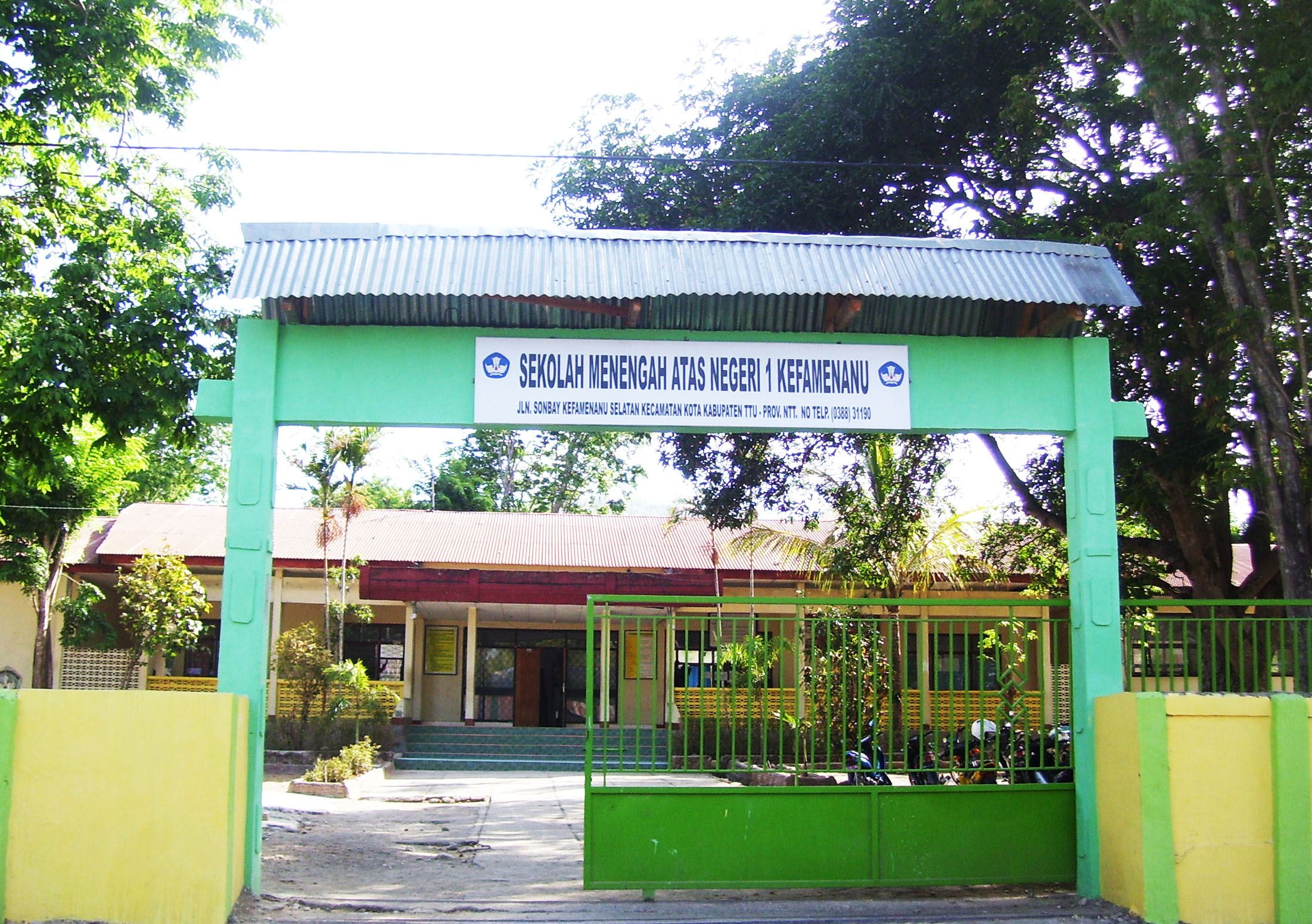
A highschool in Kefamenanu town

Education infrastructure in the regency includes 182 elementary schools, 85 junior highschools, 32 senior highschools, and 19 vocational highschools. There are two higher education institutions; University of Timor is a state-owned public university and one of only two public universities in the province, the other being University of Nusa Cendana in city of Kupang. University of Timor's main campus is located in Kefamenanu. Due to its close proximity and the lack of universities in neighbouring East Timor, many East Timorese students studied in the university; there were 6,000 in 2017. The regency has 21 registered kindergartens as of 2020.

=== Healthcare ===
Within the healthcare sector, the regency has three hospitals, 10 polyclinics, 57 puskesmas, and six pharmacies as of 2020. The regency's main public hospital, Kefamenanu Regional Hospital, is owned by the regency government and classified C-class by the Ministry of Health. Leona General Hospital is a private hospital. Kiupukan Hospital, which is owned by Parish of Kiupukan, is significantly smaller than the other two.

=== Transport ===
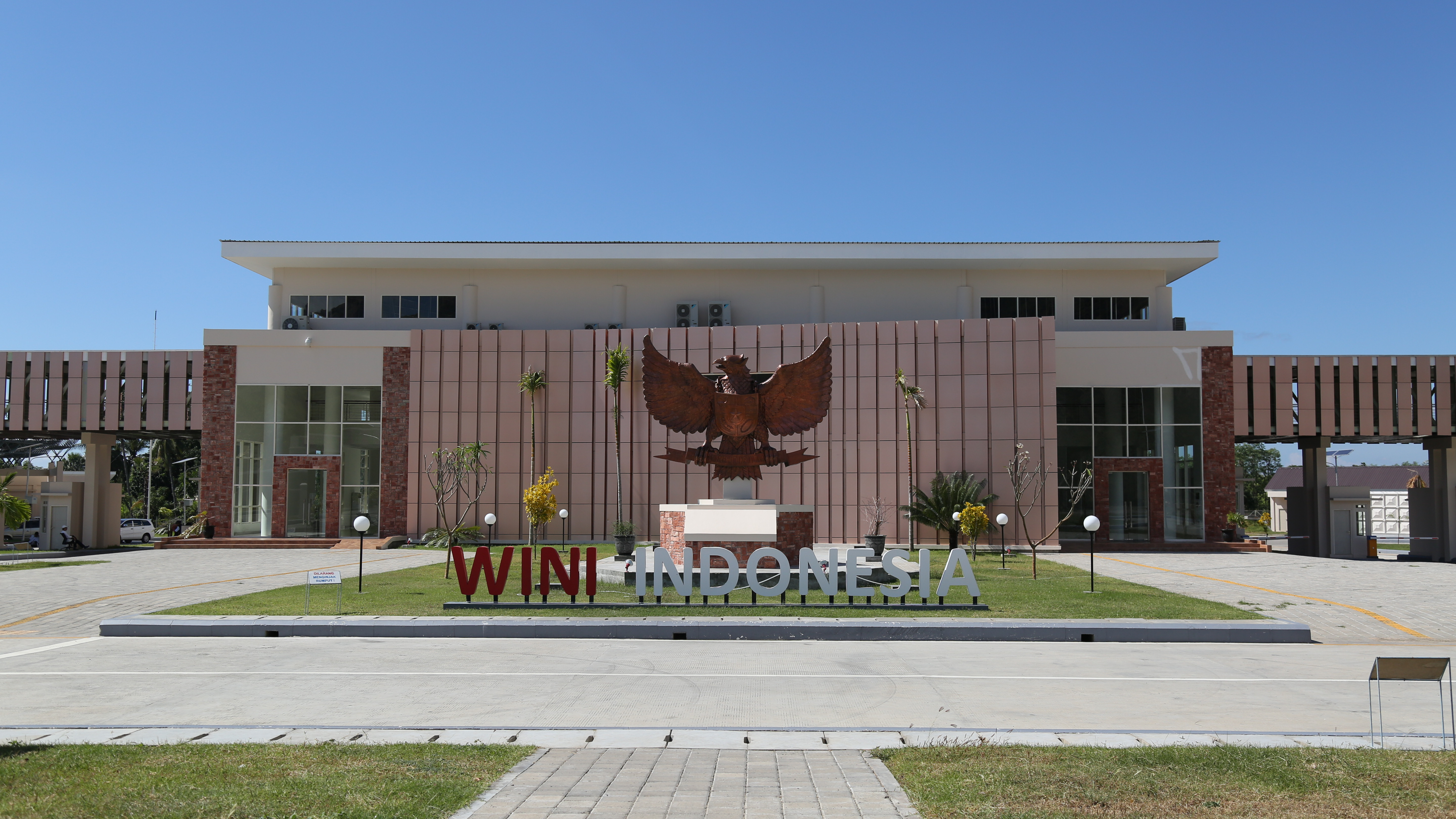
Wini Integrated Border Post in town of Wini, North Central Timor Regency

North Central Timor Regency has 1,048.40 km (651.45 miles) of roads, out of which 356.71 km (221.65 miles) have been paved with asphalt. Other than that, 276.46 km (171.78 miles) of road have gravel surface, and the rest are either concrete or soil. The regency government owns 848.85 km (527.45 miles) of roads, the rest are owned by either provincial or national government. There is no airport in the regency; the closest airport is located in Atambua, Belu Regency. A plan to build a new airport in the town Wini and build a special economic zone in the region has been mooted. An integrated border post facility (PLBN) is located in Wini, which has immigration facility, quarantine facility, helipad, storage, and a market. Indonesian integrated border posts are intended to be new economic centres and to serve as inter-border trading centres. A port facility, which is expected to be expanded as part of new special economic zone plan, is also located in Wini. On 2019, it served on average eight freight ships per month.

=== Religion ===
As of 2020, there are 60 mosques and 185 churches in the regency, according to Ministry of Religious Affairs.
