= Raifatus, East Nusa Tenggara =

Raifatus
- Village
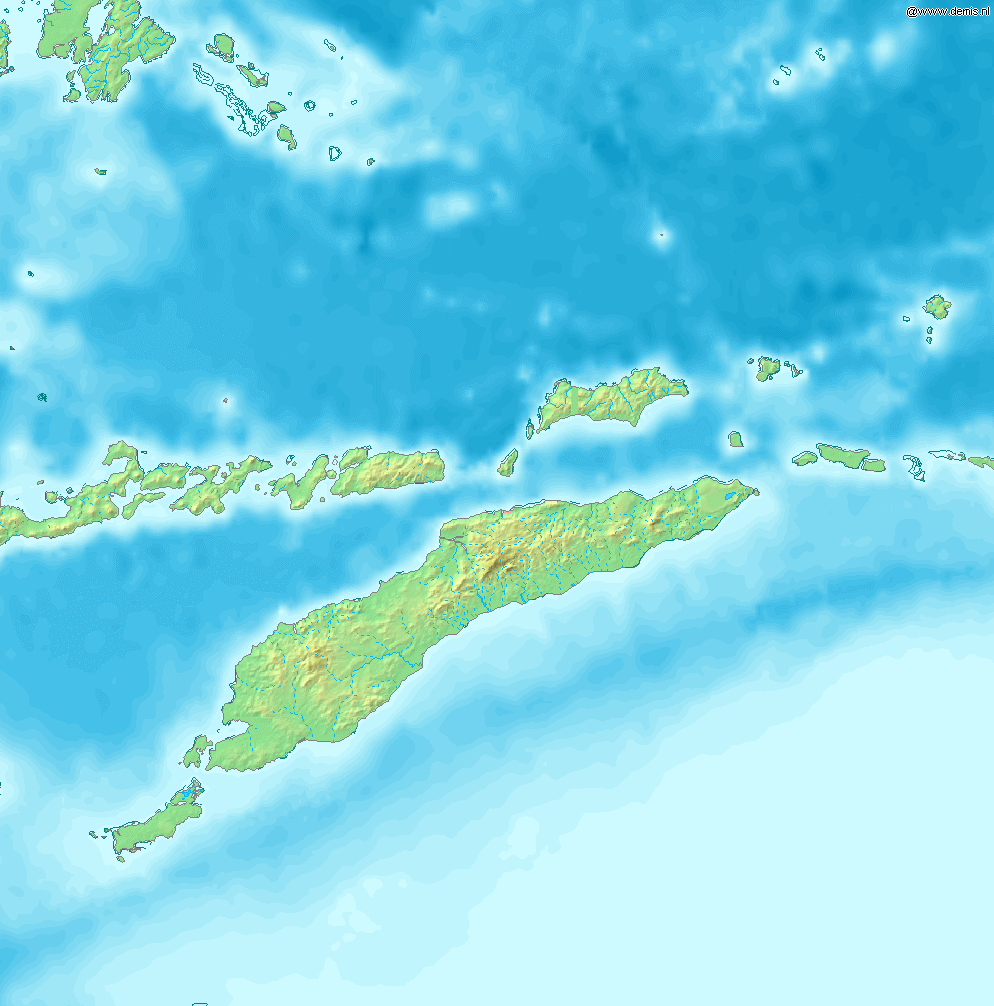
- Location in Timor Location in Lesser Sunda Islands Location in Indonesia
- Coordinates: 9°4′13.224″S 125°7′7.896″E
- Country: Indonesia
- Province: East Nusa Tenggara
- Regency: Belu Regency
- District: Raihat
- Elevation: 4,098 ft (1,249 m)

Population (2010)
  - Total: 760
- Time zone: UTC+8 (Indonesia Central Standard Time)

Raifatus is a village in Raihat district, Belu Regency in East Nusa Tenggara Province. Its population is 760.

== Climate ==
Raifatus has a borderline subtropical highland climate (Cwb) and tropical savanna climate (Aw). The coldest month averages 17.9 °C, only 0.1 short of the threshold for tropical climates. It has moderate to little rainfall from May to October and heavy to very heavy rainfall from November to April.

Climate data for Raifatus
Month	Jan	Feb	Mar	Apr	May	Jun	Jul	Aug	Sep	Oct	Nov	Dec	Year
Mean daily maximum °C (°F)	23.3 (73.9)	23.4 (74.1)	24.0 (75.2)	23.9 (75.0)	23.1 (73.6)	22.0 (71.6)	21.7 (71.1)	22.5 (72.5)	23.9 (75.0)	25.3 (77.5)	25.0 (77.0)	24.2 (75.6)	23.5 (74.3)
Daily mean °C (°F)	20.4 (68.7)	20.4 (68.7)	20.5 (68.9)	20.3 (68.5)	19.5 (67.1)	18.5 (65.3)	17.9 (64.2)	18.3 (64.9)	19.4 (66.9)	20.7 (69.3)	21.0 (69.8)	20.9 (69.6)	19.8 (67.7)
Mean daily minimum °C (°F)	17.6 (63.7)	17.4 (63.3)	17.1 (62.8)	16.7 (62.1)	16.0 (60.8)	15.1 (59.2)	14.2 (57.6)	14.2 (57.6)	14.9 (58.8)	16.1 (61.0)	17.1 (62.8)	17.6 (63.7)	16.2 (61.1)
Average precipitation mm (inches)	326 (12.8)	325 (12.8)	240 (9.4)	196 (7.7)	104 (4.1)	57 (2.2)	49 (1.9)	21 (0.8)	18 (0.7)	73 (2.9)	213 (8.4)	363 (14.3)	1,985 (78)
Source: Climate-Data.org
