= Kefamenanu =

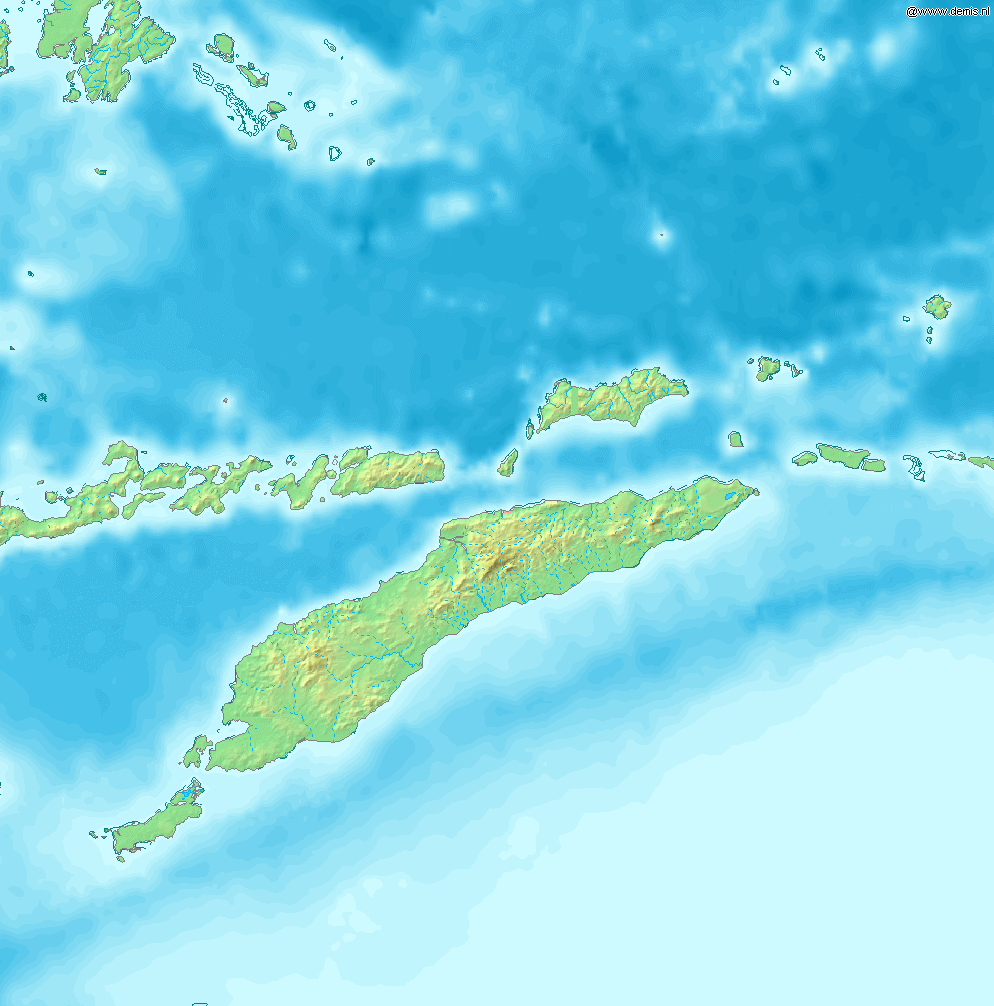
- Location in Indonesia Kefamenanu (Indonesia)
- Coordinates: 9°26′48″S 124°28′41″E
- Country: Indonesia
- Region: Lesser Sunda Islands
- Province: East Nusa Tenggara
- Territory: West Timor
- Regency: North Central Timor Regency
- Kecamatan: Kota Kefamenanu

Area
  - Total: 28.57 sq mi (74.00 km^{2})

Population (end 2024 estimate)
  - Total: 49,673
  - Density: 1,739/sq mi (671.3/km^{2})
- Time zone: UTC+8 (CIT)

Kefamenanu is a town and capital of the administrative district (kecamatan) of Kota Kefamenanu and of the North Central Timor Regency in West Timor, Indonesia. A road connects it to Halilulik and Kota Atambua to the northeast. The district covers an area of 74 km^{2} and had a population of 43,058 at the 2010 Census and 47,766 at the 2020 Census; the official estimate in end 2024 was 49,673 (comprising 25,017 males and 24,656 females). The town hosts the University of Timor, one of the two public universities in the Indonesian part of the island.

== Urban villages ==
Kota Kefamenanu District is composed of nine urban villages (kelurahan), listed below with their populations as at end 2024:

- Maubeli (7,826)
- Sasi (4,827)
- Tubuhue (5,815)
- Kefamenanu Selatan (9,692)
- Benpasi (5,912)
- Bansone (3,857)
- Kefamenanu Tengah (6,237)
- Aplasi (2,720)
- Kefamenanu Utara (2,787)

== Climate ==
Kefamenanu has a tropical savanna climate (Aw) with moderate to little rainfall from April to November and heavy rainfall from December to March.

Climate data for Kefamenanu
Month	Jan	Feb	Mar	Apr	May	Jun	Jul	Aug	Sep	Oct	Nov	Dec	Year
Mean daily maximum °C (°F)	28.0 (82.4)	27.6 (81.7)	28.3 (82.9)	28.7 (83.7)	28.5 (83.3)	27.8 (82.0)	27.3 (81.1)	27.6 (81.7)	28.2 (82.8)	28.9 (84.0)	29.3 (84.7)	28.5 (83.3)	28.2 (82.8)
Daily mean °C (°F)	25.2 (77.4)	24.6 (76.3)	24.9 (76.8)	24.8 (76.6)	24.5 (76.1)	23.7 (74.7)	22.9 (73.2)	23.0 (73.4)	23.6 (74.5)	24.7 (76.5)	25.8 (78.4)	25.5 (77.9)	24.4 (76.0)
Mean daily minimum °C (°F)	22.4 (72.3)	21.7 (71.1)	21.5 (70.7)	21.0 (69.8)	20.6 (69.1)	19.7 (67.5)	18.6 (65.5)	18.5 (65.3)	19.0 (66.2)	20.5 (68.9)	22.3 (72.1)	22.6 (72.7)	20.7 (69.3)
Average rainfall mm (inches)	268 (10.6)	234 (9.2)	200 (7.9)	98 (3.9)	65 (2.6)	35 (1.4)	28 (1.1)	10 (0.4)	5 (0.2)	28 (1.1)	94 (3.7)	244 (9.6)	1,309 (51.7)
Source: Climate-Data.org
