= A. A. Bere Tallo Airport =

Airport in East Nusa Tenggara, Indonesia

A. A. Bere Tallo Airport Bandar Udara A. A. Bere Tallo
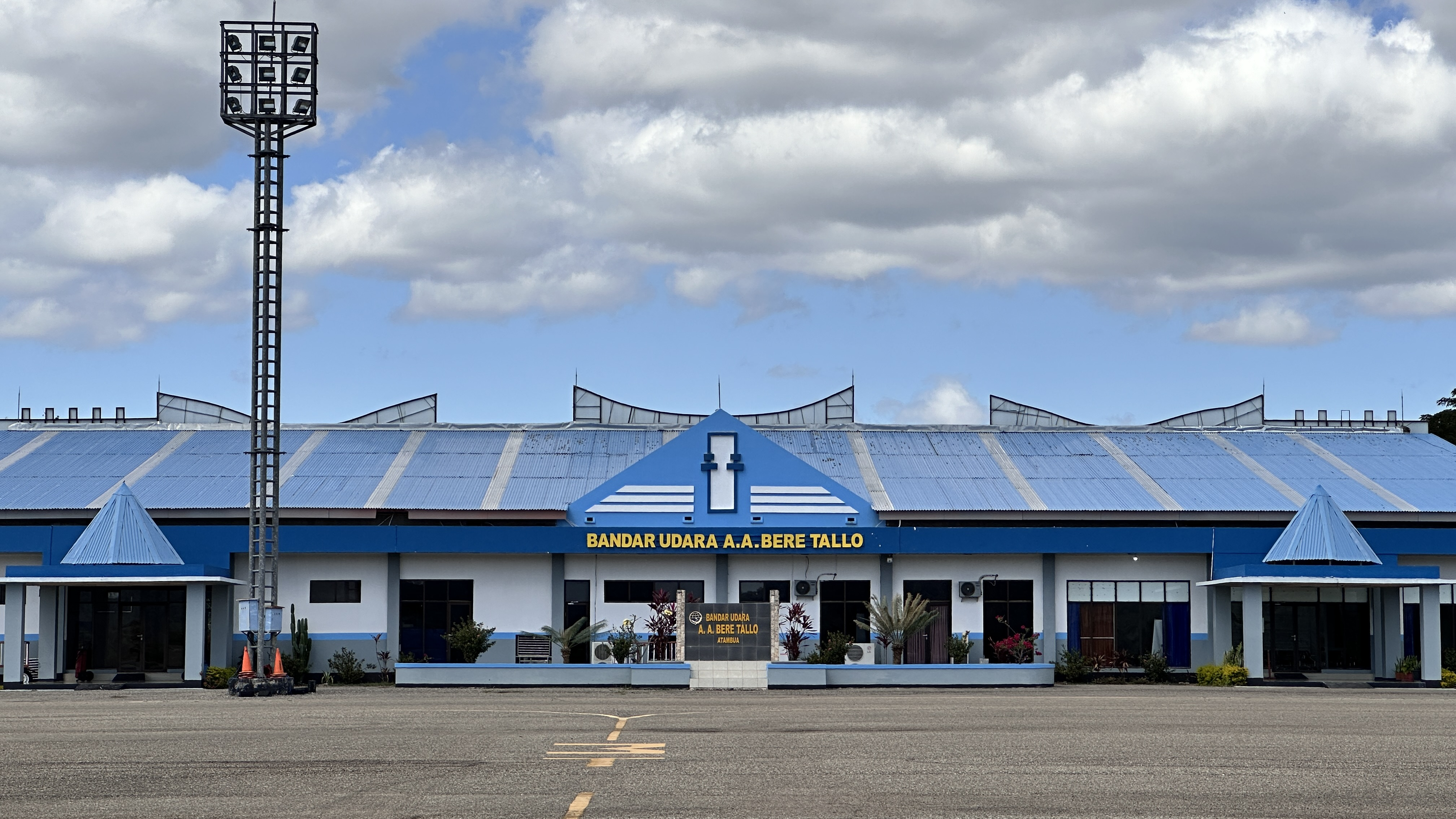
- IATA: ABU; ICAO: WATA

Summary
- Airport type: Public
- Owner: Government of Indonesia
- Operator: Directorate General of Civil Aviation
- Serves: Atambua
- Location: Atambua, Belu Regency, East Nusa Tenggara, Indonesia
- Time zone: WITA (UTC+08:00)
- Elevation AMSL: 1,434 ft (437 m)
- Coordinates: 09°04′29″S 124°54′12″E
- Interactive map of A. A. Bere Tallo Airport

Runways
Direction	Length		Surface
Direction	ft	m	Surface
08/26	5,249	1,600	Asphalt

Statistics (2024)
- Passengers: 22,563 (▼30.46%)
- Cargo (tonnes): 1.53 (▼88.36%)
- Aircraft movements: 525 (▼23.47%)
- Source: DGCA

A.A. Bere Tallo Airport (IATA: ABU, ICAO: WATA), formerly known as Haliwen Airport, is a domestic airport serving Atambua, the capital of Belu Regency on the island of Timor in East Nusa Tenggara, Indonesia. The airport is named after Alfonsius Andreas Bere Tallo, the first regent of Belu Regency, while the former name is named after the district where the airport is located. It is currently one of only two airports in West Timor with regular scheduled flights, the other being the larger and busier El Tari International Airport in Kupang. Located approximately 4 km (2.5 miles) from Atambua town center, the airport serves as a key gateway to Atambua and Belu Regency. Currently, it is served by a single scheduled route to Kupang, operated by Wings Air. Previously, the airport offered routes to Kisar and Dili operated by Merpati Nusantara Airlines; however, all of these services have since been discontinued.

== History ==
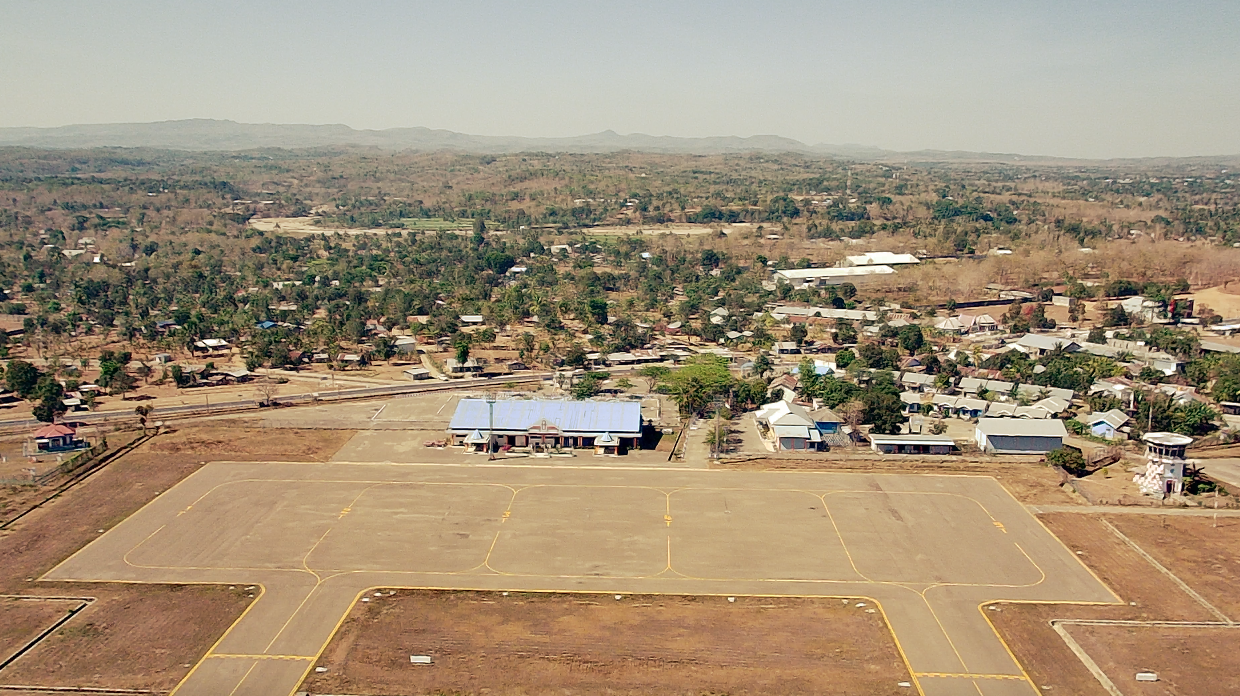
Apron view

Haliwen Airfield was originally constructed by the Japanese during their occupation of the Dutch East Indies in 1942 as a military airfield at the height of World War II, intended to support operations against Allied forces. Previously, a small aerodrome existed at Atambua, used by the Royal Netherlands East Indies Army (KNIL) prior to the Battle of Timor. However, it was little more than a quagmire and proved unsuitable for operations, rendering it ineffective in resisting the advancing Japanese forces. The airfield initially featured an 800-meter grass runway. Throughout the war, the airfield was repeatedly targeted and bombed by Allied forces due to its strategic nature. Following the war, the airfield was taken over by the Indonesian Air Force and closed to civilian traffic, functioning only as an emergency airstrip.

In 1972, the runway was extended to 900 meters and upgraded with a stone surface. In 1974, the first aircraft operated by Merpati Nusantara Airlines landed at the airfield, followed in 1979 by services from Mission Aviation Fellowship. The airfield was officially inaugurated for civil aviation use in 1976; however, at the time, it was limited to non-scheduled flights.

In April 1983, Merpati Nusantara Airlines launched a pioneering round-trip route between Kupang, Atambua, and Dili—then part of the province of East Timor—operating twice weekly.

In 2010, scheduled commercial services began when Susi Air launched the Kupang–Atambua–Kupang route using Cessna Caravan 208 aircraft with a capacity of 12 passengers, operating daily flights. Around the same time, Merpati Nusantara Airlines introduced a twice-weekly Kupang–Atambua–Kisar service. Nusantara Buana Air also briefly operated the Kupang–Atambua route in late 2011 before ceasing operations shortly thereafter. Following the introduction of scheduled services, the airport underwent significant improvements, including a major expansion of the terminal building from a small facility into a larger one. In September 2013, the airport was renamed A.A. Bere Tallo Airport in honor of Alfonsius Andreas Bere Tallo, the first Regent of Belu Regency.

In December 2019, TransNusa launched the Kupang–Atambua route using ATR 72 aircraft; however, the service was later discontinued. As of 2026, Wings Air is the sole airline serving this route and the only carrier operating flights to and from the airport.

== Facilities and development ==
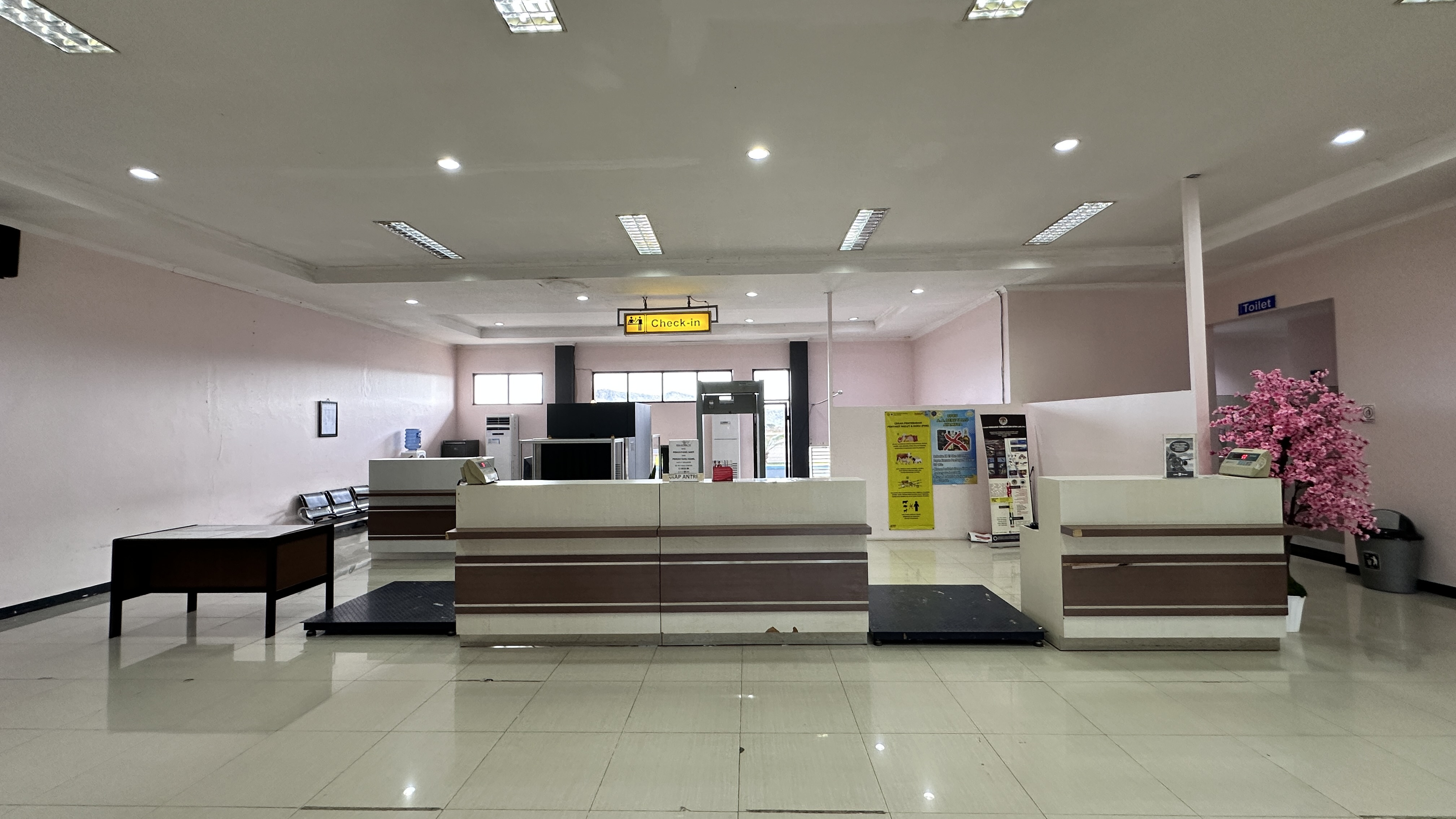
Check-in area

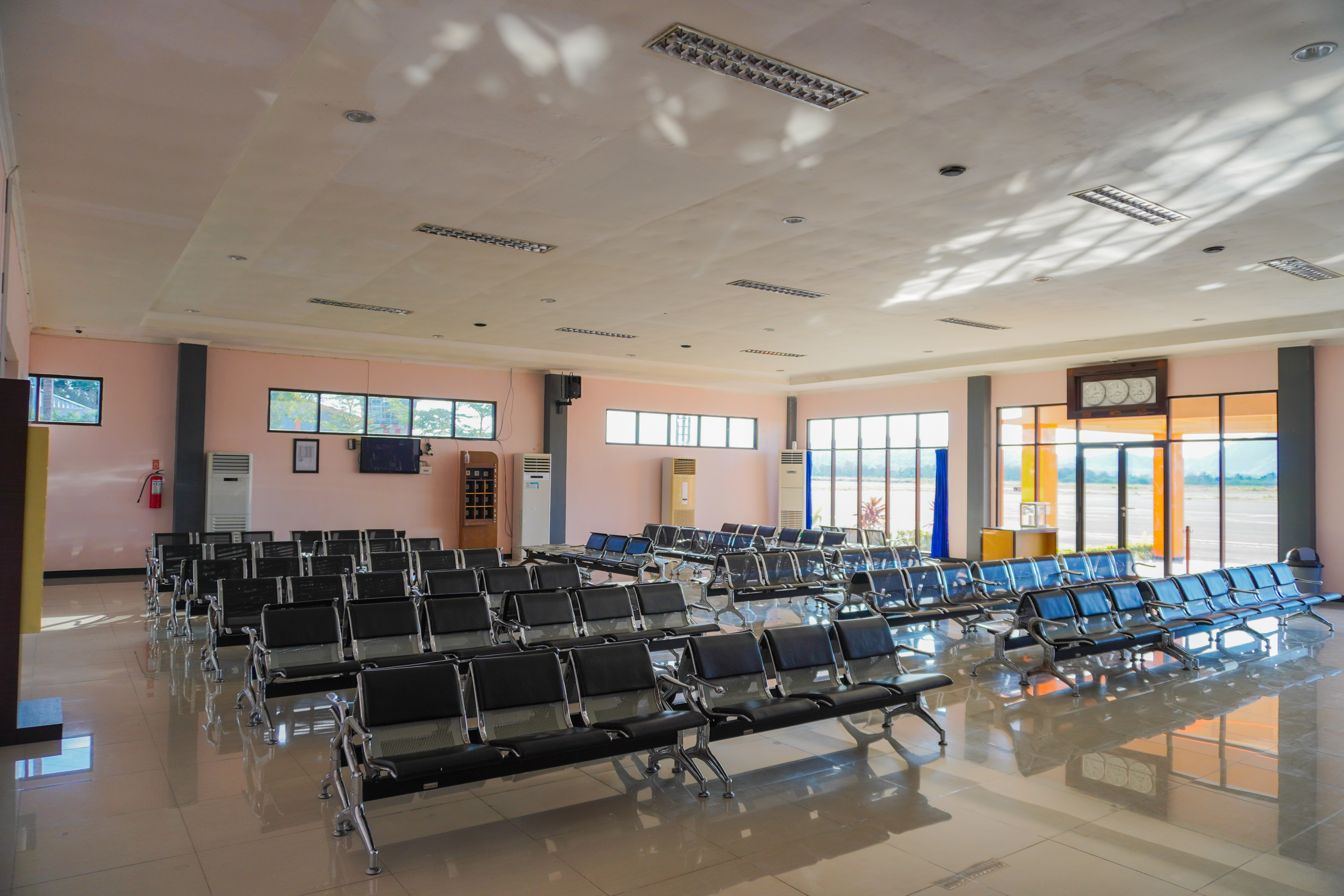
Boarding gate

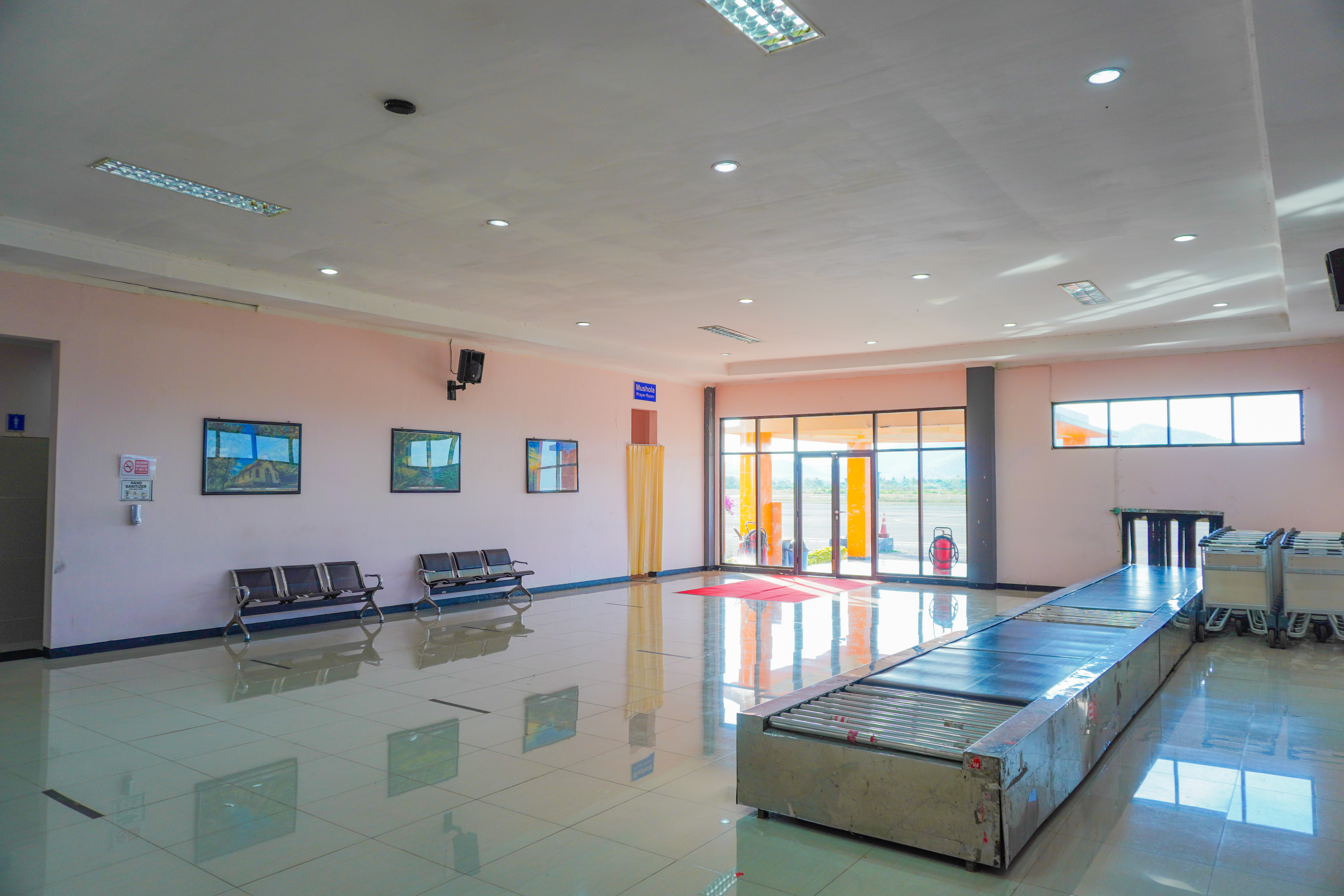
Baggage claim area

Due to its proximity to the Indonesia–East Timor border, the airport is considered to have strategic importance. Currently, the airport has a single runway measuring 1,600 m × 30 m, capable of accommodating aircraft such as the ATR 72 and Fokker 50. Proposals have been made by the Ministry of Transportation to extend the runway to 2,000 m, and eventually to 2,500 m, to enable operations by narrow-body aircraft such as the Boeing 737 and Airbus A320; however, these plans have not yet been implemented.

== Airlines and destinations ==
Airlines	Destinations
Wings Air	Kupang

== Statistics ==
Annual passenger numbers and aircraft statistics
Year	Passengers handled	Passenger % change	Cargo (tonnes)	Cargo % change	Aircraft movements	Aircraft % change
2006	2,820	Steady	N/A	Steady	200	Steady
2007	2,154	▼23.62	0.78	Steady	196	▼2.00
2008	1,611	▼25.21	N/A	Steady	196	Steady
2009	1,761	▲9.31	0.40	Steady	160	▼18.37
2010	1,873	▲6.36	0.37	▼7.50	269	▲68.13
2011	8,594	▲358.84	N/A	Steady	1,070	▲297.77
2012	5,648	▼34.28	N/A	Steady	786	▼26.54
2013	3,836	▼32.08	N/A	Steady	673	▼14.38
2014	5,951	▲55.14	0.02	Steady	696	▲3.42
2015	22,571	▲279.28	11.93	▲59550.00	812	▲16.67
2016	76,951	▲240.93	0.04	▼99.66	1,488	▲83.25
2017	82,989	▲7.85	N/A	Steady	1,666	▲11.96
2018	102,786	▲23.85	N/A	Steady	2,138	▲28.33
2019	43,118	▼58.05	2.56	Steady	848	▼60.34
2020	39,313	▼8.82	24.07	▲840.23	898	▲5.90
2021	15,725	▼60.00	23.54	▼2.20	401	▼55.35
2022	30,788	▲95.79	11.43	▼51.44	688	▲71.57
2023	32,446	▲5.39	13.14	▲14.96	686	▼0.29
2024	22,563	▼30.46	1.53	▼88.36	525	▼23.47
^{Source: DGCA, BPS}
