= University of Timor =

University in Indonesia

- Universitas Timor
- Type: Public
- Established: 16 July 2000
- Location: North Central Timor, East Nusa Tenggara, Indonesia; 9°30′45.7″S 124°30′41.8″E
- Website: unimor.ac.id

The University of Timor (Indonesian: Universitas Timor, abbreviated Unimor) is an Indonesian public university in the island of Timor, in the town of Kefamenanu which is part of the North Central Timor Regency. As a public university, Unimor accepts students partially through the SNMPTN system administered nationwide. It is one of the two public universities on the Indonesian part of the island, the other being the University of Nusa Cendana.

Following the independence of East Timor and exodus of Indonesian nationals (many to Kefamenanu), the teaching staff formerly from Universitas Timor Timur established the university in 2000 on a 40-hectare plot of land donated by the local council and a Rp 2 billion funding from the central government. Initially a private university, it attempted to be nationalized starting around 2010 and after several rejections, was officially made a public university in 2014.

Located 7 hours away from the provincial capital of Kupang, the university is close to the border with East Timor and hence receive some students from across the border. In 2017, it claimed that 6,000 East Timorese students had studied at Unimor. As comparison, there were 5,000 active students in the same year with an intake of 1,500. The institute has been categorized as part of the fourth cluster - the lowest tier - among other higher education institutions in Indonesia, as of 2017.
