= Rinhat =

District of Malaka Regency, East Nusa Tenggara

- District
- Interactive map of Rinhat
- Location within East Nusa Tenggara Location within Lesser Sunda Islands Location within Indonesia
- Coordinates: 9°36′23.47247″S 124°44′10.82015″E
- Country: Indonesia
- Region: Lesser Sunda Islands
- Province: East Nusa Tenggara
- Regency: Malaka
- District seat: Biudukfoho

Area
  - Total: 151.72 km^{2} (58.58 sq mi)

Population (2023)
  - Total: 28,278
  - Density: 186.38/km^{2} (482.73/sq mi)
- Time zone: UTC+8 (ICT)
- Villages: 20

Rinhat is a district in Malaka Regency, East Nusa Tenggara, Indonesia. In 2023, this district had a population of 28,278 people with an area of 151.72 km^{2}.

== Governance ==
=== Villages ===
Administratively, Rinhat District consists of 20 villages, namely:

Regional code (Kode wilayah)	Name	Area (km^{2})	Population (2023)
53.21.05.2001	Saenama	10.54	1,333
53.21.05.2002	Wekmidar	6.12	889
53.21.05.2003	Lotas	8.13	561
53.21.05.2004	Nanin	7.21	1,051
53.21.05.2005	Alala	13.59	1,078
53.21.05.2006	Oekmurak	3.60	1,032
53.21.05.2007	Webetun	2.25	752
53.21.05.2008	Naet	7.15	1,595
53.21.05.2009	Biudukfoho	2.43	1,473
53.21.05.2010	Niti	2.25	1,137
53.21.05.2011	Tafuli	6.21	851
53.21.05.2012	Boen	6.57	1,266
53.21.05.2013	Wekeke	6.17	1,162
53.21.05.2014	Raisamane	10.78	1,256
53.21.05.2015	Weain	9.88	1,100
53.21.05.2016	Nabutaek	13.55	988
53.21.05.2017	Tafuli I	16.84	851
53.21.05.2018	Nanebot	8.74	808
53.21.05.2019	Muke	4.84	534
53.21.05.2020	Naiusu	4.87	561
Totals		151.72	28,278
