= Mutis district =

Mutis
- District
- Interactive map of Mutis
- Country: Indonesia
- Province: East Nusa Tenggara
- Regency: North Central Timor

Mutis is a district (kecamatan) located in North Central Timor Regency, East Nusa Tenggara, Indonesia.

== Description ==
Mutis District is located in the southwest of North Central Timor Regency, bordering on the west with East Amfoang District in Kupang Regency and Fatumnasi District in South Central Timor Regency.This district also borders the Oecusse Municipality, an exclave of Timor Leste, to the northeast. This district has an area that is close to the mountainous area, with relatively far access from the coastal area.
