= Weliman =

District in East Nusa Tenggara, Indonesia

- District
- Interactive map of Weliman
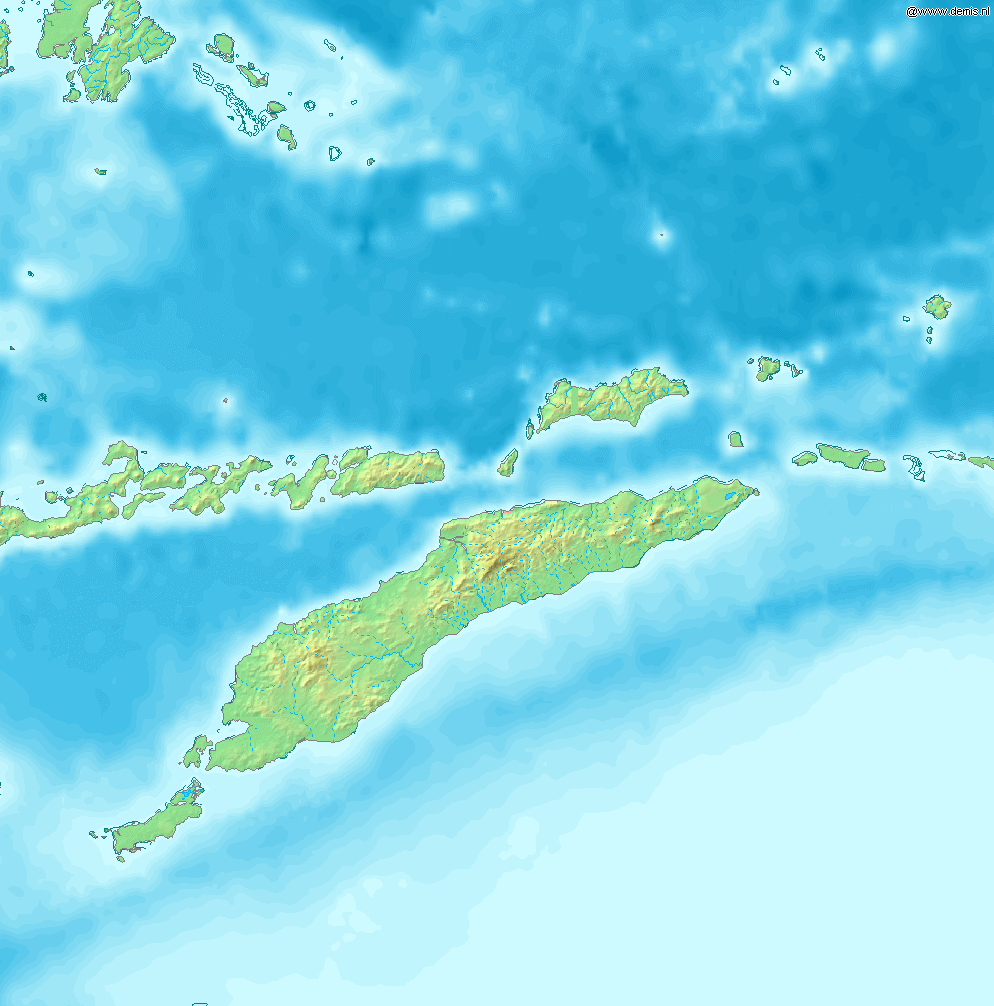
- Location within Timor Location within East Nusa Tenggara Location within Indonesia
- Coordinates: 9°37′52.24116″S 124°51′51.22775″E
- Country: Indonesia
- Region: Lesser Sunda Islands
- Province: East Nusa Tenggara
- Regency: Malaka
- District seat: Laleten

Area
  - Total: 88.25 km^{2} (34.07 sq mi)

Population (2023)
  - Total: 24,126
  - Density: 273.4/km^{2} (708.1/sq mi)
- Time zone: UTC+8 (ICT)
- Villages: 14

Weliman is a district in Malaka Regency, East Nusa Tenggara, Indonesia. In 2023, this district had a population of 24,126 people with an area of 88.25 km^{2}.

== Governance ==
=== Villages ===
Administratively, Weliman District consists of 14 villages, namely:

| Regional code (Kode wilayah) | Name | Area (km^{2}) | Population (2023) | RW (rukun warga) | RT (rukun tetangga) |
|---|---|---|---|---|---|
| 53.21.04.2001 | Wesey | 8.62 | 971 | 5 | 10 |
| 53.21.04.2002 | Haitimuk | 7.33 | 3,009 | 14 | 28 |
| 53.21.04.2003 | Laleten | 12.79 | 2,242 | 9 | 18 |
| 53.21.04.2004 | Kleseleon | 6.51 | 1,424 | 4 | 9 |
| 53.21.04.2005 | Angkaes | 8.44 | 1,801 | 8 | 16 |
| 53.21.04.2006 | Wederok | 8.71 | 1,551 | 7 | 16 |
| 53.21.04.2007 | Lamudur | 8.00 | 1,282 | 5 | 10 |
| 53.21.04.2008 | Forekmodok | 5.08 | 1,608 | 5 | 12 |
| 53.21.04.2009 | Umalawain | 2.00 | 1,983 | 6 | 12 |
| 53.21.04.2010 | Lakulo | 9.73 | 2,553 | 9 | 18 |
| 53.21.04.2011 | Leunklot | 3.42 | 1,694 | 9 | 15 |
| 53.21.04.2012 | Haliklaran | 2.26 | 1,832 | 6 | 12 |
| 53.21.04.2013 | Bonetasea | 2.26 | 1,200 | 5 | 10 |
| 53.21.04.2014 | Taaba | 3.10 | 976 | 6 | 12 |
| | Totals | 88.25 | 24,126 | 98 | 198 |
