= Malaka Regency =

Regency in East Nusa Tenggara, Indonesia

Malaka Regency Kabupaten Malaka
- Regency
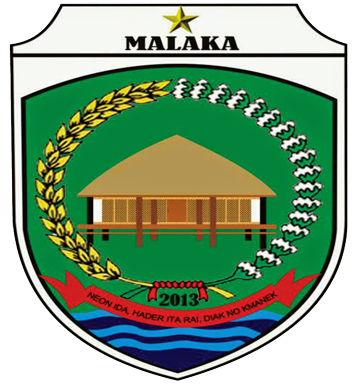
- Coat of arms

- Location within East Nusa Tenggara

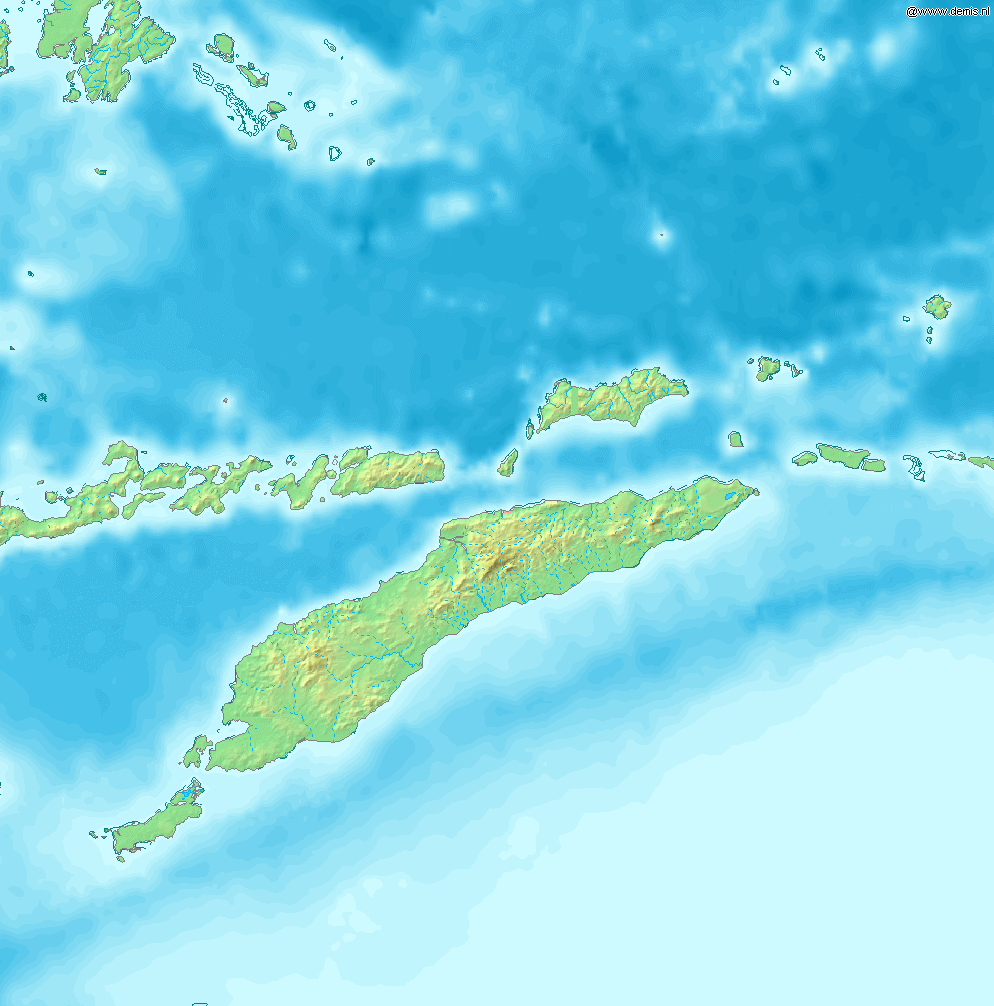
- Location in Timor, Lesser Sunda Islands and Indonesia Malaka Regency (Lesser Sunda Islands) Malaka Regency (Indonesia)
- Coordinates: 9°34′02″S 124°54′27″E
- Country: Indonesia
- Region: Lesser Sunda Islands
- Province: East Nusa Tenggara
- Established: 14 December 2012
- Capital: Betun

Government
  - Regent: Stefanus Bria Seran
  - Vice Regent: Henri Melki Simu

Area
  - Total: 1,160.63 km^{2} (448.12 sq mi)

Population (mid 2025 estimate)
  - Total: 198,464
  - Density: 170.997/km^{2} (442.880/sq mi)
- Time zone: UTC+8 (ICST)
- Area code: (+62) 389
- Website: malakakab.go.id

Malaka Regency is a regency in the province of East Nusa Tenggara, Indonesia. The regency was established on 14 December 2012, comprising twelve districts which had formerly been the southern part of Belu Regency.

The area now comprising the new Regency (covering 1,160.63 km^{2}) had 164,134 inhabitants at the 2010 Census, which had risen to 183,900 at the 2020 Census; the official estimate as of mid-2025 was 198,464 (comprising 97,988 males and 100,508 females). The capital of the regency is the town of Betun.

== Demographics ==
Of the population in mid 2025, 52,931 (26.67%) were below the age of 15, and 145,533 were aged 15 and above; of the latter, 129,214 (65.11%) were of working age and 16,319 (8.22%) were aged 65 and above.

== Administration ==
The new Malaka Regency is composed of twelve districts (kecamatan), tabulated below with their areas and populations at the 2010 Census and the 2020 Census, together with the official estimate as of early 2025. The table also includes the locations of the district headquarters, the number of administrative villages in each district (all classed as rural desa), and its postal code.

Kode Wilayah	Name of District (kecamatan)	Area in km^{2}	Pop'n Census 2010	Pop'n Census 2020	Pop'n Estimate early 2025	Admin centre	No. of villages	Post code
53.21.03	Wewiku	97.90	17,079	18,630	19,591	Alkani	12	85775
53.21.02	Malaka Barat (West Malaka)	87.41	19,792	22,630	24,361	Besikama	16	85763
53.21.04	Weliman	88.25	17,194	19,710	21,227	Knoi Laran	14	85774
53.21.05	Rinhat	151.72	13,408	13,510	13,665	Biudukfoho	20	85764
53.21.06	Io Kufeu	67.79	7,363	8,140	8,623	Fatuao	7	85768
53.21.07	Sasita Mean	65.48	7,946	8,880	9,448	Kaputu	9	85769
53.21.01	Malaka Tengah (Central Malaka)	168.69	34,034	39,650	43,028	Betun	17	85762
53.21.12	Botin Laobele	39.03	4,483	5,220	5,671	Sarina	5	85765
53.21.08	Laen Manen	94.02	10,868	12,700	13,811	Eokpuran	9	85718
53.21.09	Malaka Timur (East Malaka)	83.28	9,142	10,000	10,523	Boas	6	85761
53.21.11	Kobalima	120.95	16,815	18,370	19,327	Raihenek	8	85766
53.21.12	Kobalima Timur (East Kobalima)	96.11	6,010	6,450	6,733	Maroma Rai	4	85767
	Totals	1,160.63	164,134	183,898	196,008	Betun	127	

== Radio AM/FM ==
In this newly established regency, there are 4 radio stations, which are all broadcast from Atambua (in Belu Regency), as help from RRI Atambua

No.	Name of Radio	Frequency
1	RRI Programa 1 Atambua*	FM 91.5 MHz
2	RRI Programa 2 Atambua	FM 99.8 MHz
3	RRI Programa 3	FM 99.0 MHz

Note: These radios only has mono channel in the regency.
