= Atapupu =

- Town
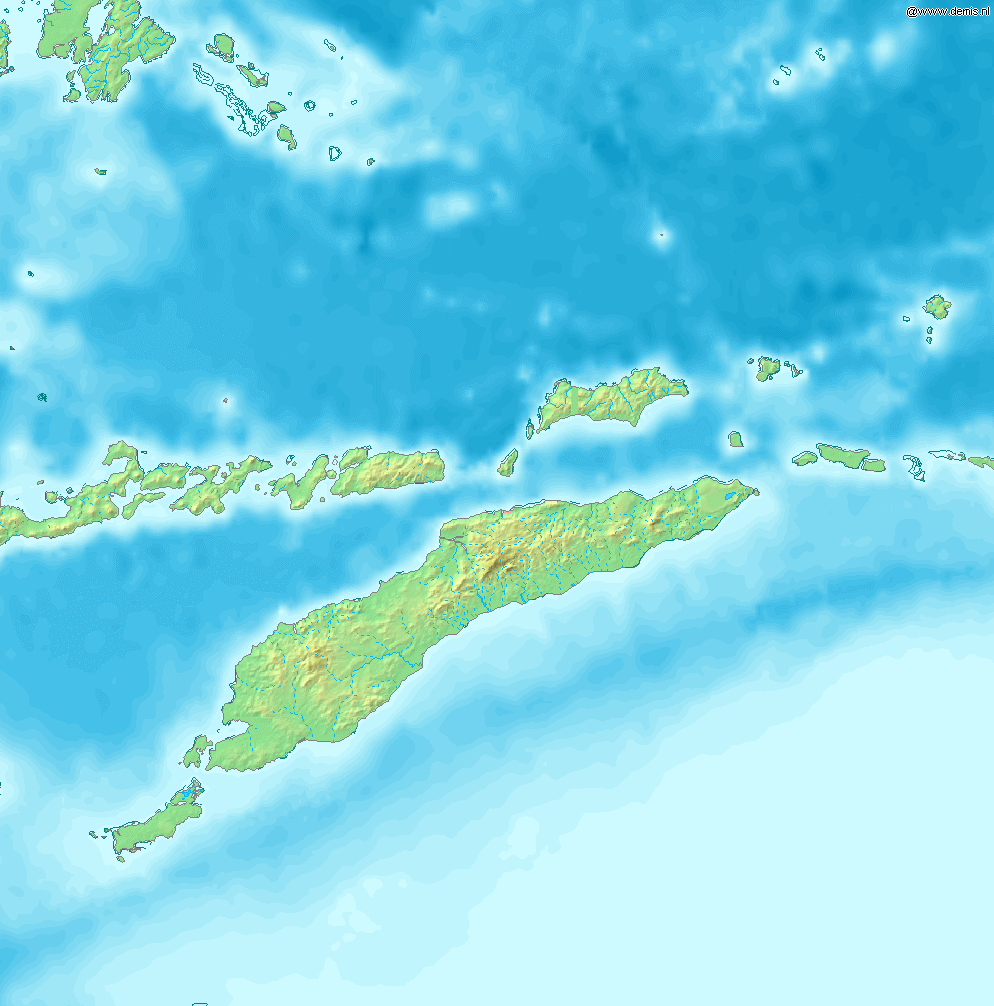
- Location in Timor, Lesser Sunda Islands and Indonesia Atapupu (Lesser Sunda Islands) Atapupu (Indonesia)
- Coordinates: 8°59′41″S 124°51′54″E
- Country: Indonesia
- Province: East Nusa Tenggara
- Regency: Belu Regency
- District: Kakuluk Mesak
- Time zone: UTC+8 (ICST)
- Area code: (+62) 389
- Climate: Aw

Atapupu is a port town in the Indonesian part of Timor Island (West Timor, in Kakuluk Mesak District of Belu Regency in East Nusa Tenggara Province. It is located on the northernmost part of West Timor, close to the border with East Timor.

== History ==
Prior to the 18th century, Atapupu was a port under influence of the Portuguese, but Dutch influence reached the area by 1797. While the Portuguese seized Atapupu during the Napoleonic Wars, the district of Atapupu was later returned to the Dutch, but border disputes continued. Dutch forces attacked Atapupu in 1817 and 1818. The latter of the two attacks occurred on 20 April 1818, when 30 soldiers overcame the town's Portuguese garrison and replaced the Portuguese ensign with Dutch ones.

As part of Dutch Timor, Atapupu was the region's second port after Kupang, being connected by road to the larger port settlement. It was the seat of Dutch administration for what is today the Belu Regency, until the seat was moved to Atambua in 1916. During the Japanese occupation of the Dutch East Indies, Atapupu was used as a staging point for barges and was heavily damaged by Australian bombing.

In the late 2010s, the Indonesian government began to designate Atapupu's port as a transit point for goods exported to East Timor by sea.

== Town ==
The Indonesian Navy operates a naval post at Atapupu.
