= Belu Regency =

Regency in East Nusa Tenggara, Indonesia

Belu Regency Kabupaten Belu Rai Belu
- Regency
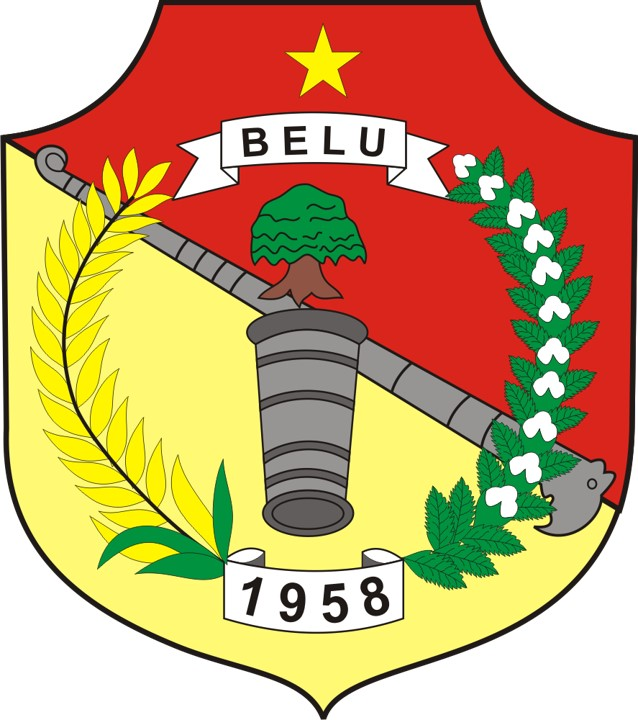
- Coat of arms
- Nickname: Belu
- Location within East Nusa Tenggara

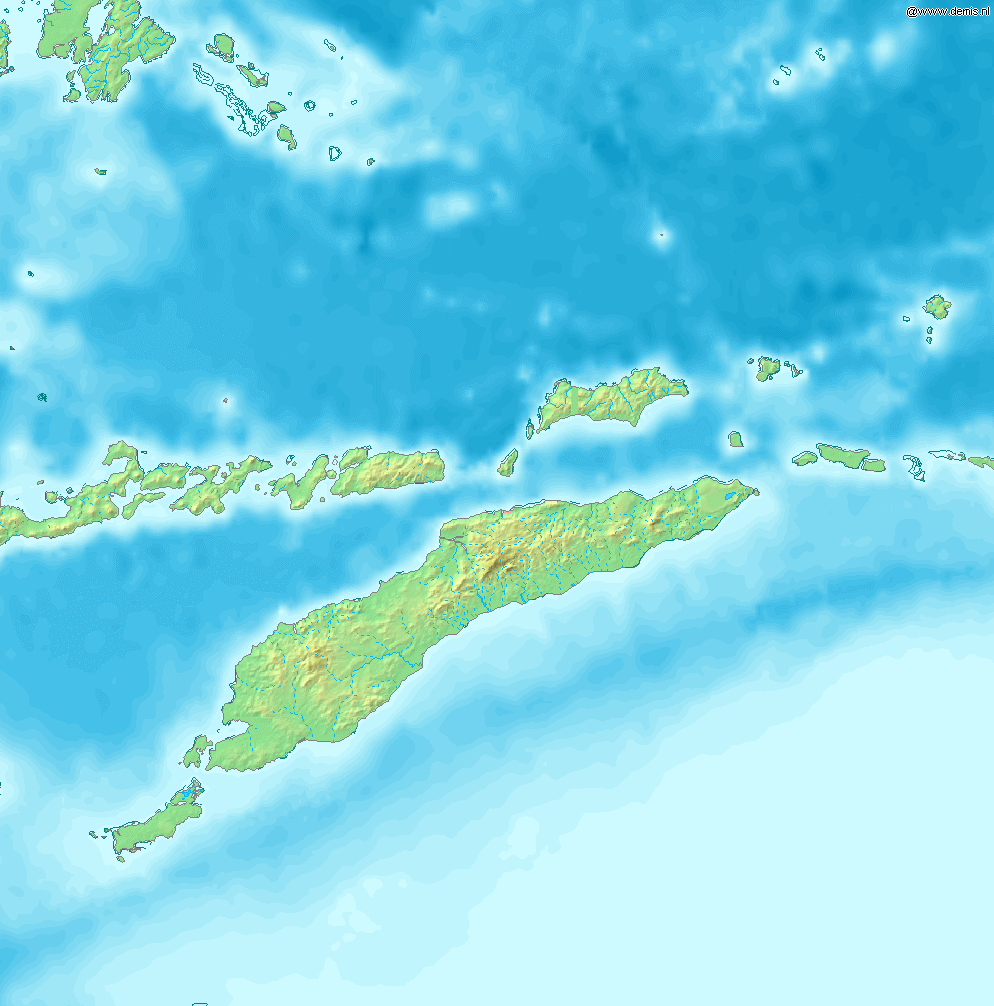
- Location in Timor, Lesser Sunda Islands and Indonesia Belu Regency (Lesser Sunda Islands) Belu Regency (Indonesia)
- Coordinates: 9°20′45″S 124°57′2″E
- Country: Indonesia
- Region: Lesser Sunda Islands
- Province: East Nusa Tenggara
- Settled: 20 December 1956
- Capital: Atambua

Government
  - Regent: Willybrodus Lay
  - Vice Regent: Vicente Hornai Gonsalves

Area
  - Total: 1,284.94 km^{2} (496.12 sq mi)
- Elevation: 375 m (1,230 ft)

Population (mid 2025 estimate)
  - Total: 240,400
  - Density: 187.1/km^{2} (484.6/sq mi)
- Time zone: UTC+8 (ICST)
- Postcodes: 856xx, 857xx
- Area code: (+62) 389
- Religion: Christianity 95.45% — Catholic 88.39% — Protestant 7.10% Islam 4.30% Hindu 0.19% Buddhism 0.02%
- Website: belukab.go.id

Belu Regency is a regency in East Nusa Tenggara province of Indonesia. Situated on the north side of Timor island, it originally stretched to the south coast, but in December 2012 its southern half was detached to form the new Malaka Regency. It now adjoins the North Central Timor Regency to the west, the new Malaka Regency to the south, and the separate nation of Timor-Leste to the east, while to the north lies the Sawu Sea. Established on 20 December 1958, Belu Regency has its seat (capital) in the large town of Atambua, which lies inland from the coastal port of Atapupu (which is in Kakuluk Mesak District).

== Etymology ==
"Belu" means "friend" in the indigenous language of Tetum.

== Demographics ==
Of the population in mid 2025, 68,100 (28.33%) were below the age of 15, and 172,300 were aged 15 and above; of the latter, 157,400 (65.48%) were of working age and 14,900 (6.2%) were aged 65 and above.

== Administrative districts ==
The Belu Regency was until 2013 divided into twenty-four districts (kecamatan), but in December 2012, the twelve southern kecamatan were removed to form the new Malaka Regency, leaving the twelve northern kecamatan in Belu Regency. The residual Belu Regency is thus composed of twelve districts (kecamatan), tabulated below with their areas (in km^{2}) and their populations at the 2010 Census and 2020 Census, together with the official estimates as of mid-2025. The table also includes the locations of the district headquarters, the number of administrative villages in each district (totaling 69 rural desa and 12 urban kelurahan - the latter being the 12 comprising Atambua town), and its postal code.

Kode Wilayah	Name of District (kecamatan)	Area in km^{2}	Pop'n Census 2010	Pop'n Census 2020	Pop'n Estimate mid 2025	Admin centre	No. of villages	Post code
53.04.12	Kota Atambua (Central Atambua)	24.90	26,396	30,837	34,100	Tenukiik	4	85711 -85718
53.04.21	Atambua Barat (West Atambua)	15.55	21,604	24,178	26,200	Sesekoe	4	85713 -85718
53.04.22	Atambua Selatan (East Atambua)	15.73	22,464	26,144	28,900	Asuulun	4	85716 -85718
	Total Atambua town	56.18	70,464	81,159	89,200		12	85711 -85718
53.04.13	Rai Manuk	179.42	14,411	16,755	18,500	Arekama	9	85760
53.04.04	Tasifeto Barat (West Tasifeto)	224.19	22,362	24,545	26,400	Kimbana	8	85753
53.04.05	Kakuluk Mesak	187.54	17,608	21,988	25,100	Umarese	6	85752
53.04.23	Nanaet Dubesi	60.25	4,006	4,783	5,300	Tete Seban	4	85751
53.04.02	Tasifeto Timur (East Tasifeto)	211.37	20,932	26,121	29,800	Wedomu	12	85771
	Western rural sector ^{(a)}	862.77	79,319	94,192	105,100		39	
53.04.03	Raihat	87.20	13,319	14,359	15,300	Bei Sari Loo	6	85773
53.04.17	Lasiolat	64.48	6,166	7,096	7,800	Lafuli	7	85771
53.04.01	Lamaknen	105.90	11,583	12,632	13,500	Weluli	9	85772
53.04.18	Lamaknen Selatan (South Lamaknen)	108.41	7,312	8,535	9,400	Pie Bulak	8	85770
	Eastern salient ^{(b)}	365.99	38,380	42,622	46,000		30	
Totals for	Belu Regency	1,284.94	188,163	217,973	240,400		81	

Note: (a) the five westerly rural kecamatan, mainly surrounding or south of Atambua, including the northern coast.
(b) the area projecting into Timor-Leste.

== Media ==
Belu Regency is served with four radio stations that cover the wider area around this regency (including Malaka Regency, Alor Regency, and Timor Tengah Utara Regency), which are RRI Pro1 Atambua (FM 91.5 MHz) RRI Pro2 Atambua (FM 99.8 MHz) RRI Pro3 (FM 99.0 MHz), and Saluran Citra Budaya Timor (alias Pro4) (FM 93.1 MHz). There's still a lot of radio that can be found in the town.

The regency is only served with two television stations (TVRI - including TVRI East Nusa Tenggara, Belu TV) and a few other Timor-Leste stations that reach the border pass.
