= Atambua =

- Town
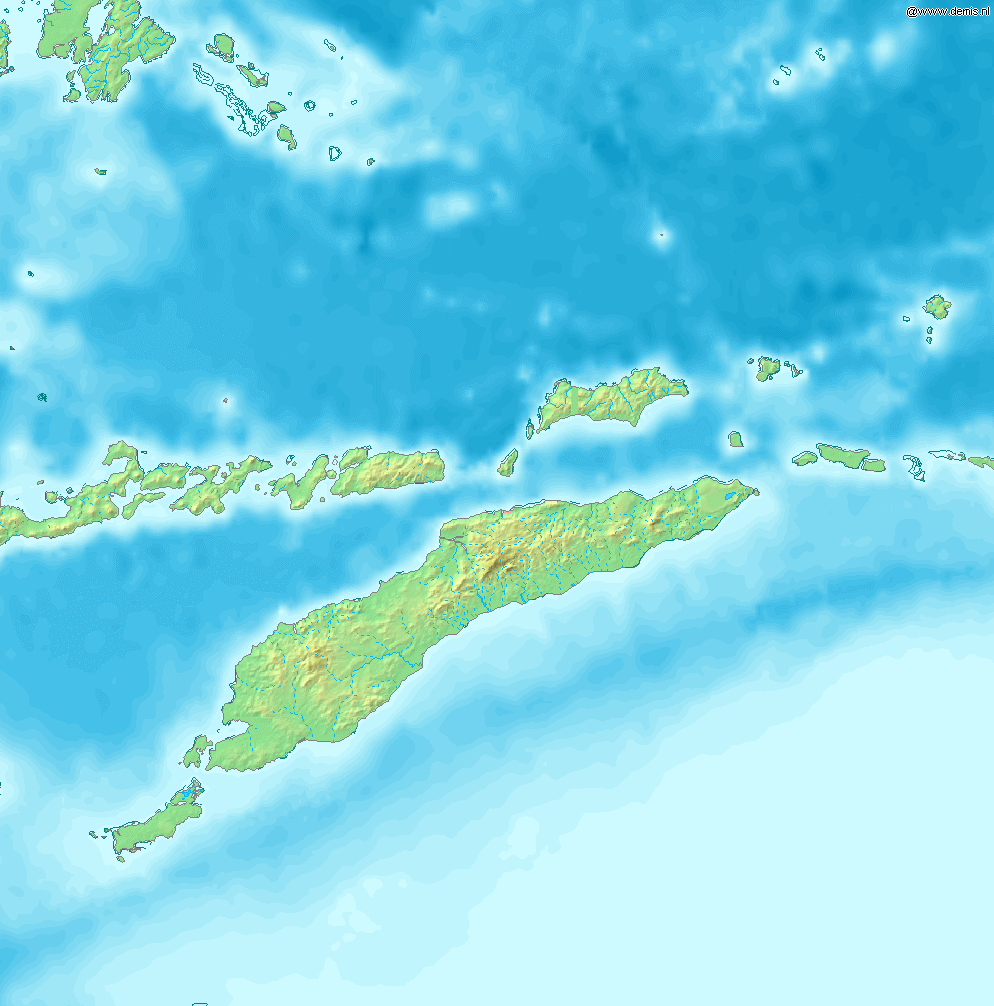
- Location in Timor, Lesser Sunda Islands and [ Indonesia Atambua (Lesser Sunda Islands) Atambua (Indonesia)
- Coordinates: 9°6′22″S 124°53′33″E
- Country: Indonesia
- Region: Lesser Sunda Islands
- Province: East Nusa Tenggara
- Regency: Belu Regency

Area
  - Total: 63.80 km^{2} (24.63 sq mi)
  - Land: 63.80 km^{2} (24.63 sq mi)
  - Water: 0.0 km^{2} (0 sq mi) 0%
- Elevation: 350 m (1,150 ft)

Population (2024 estimate)
  - Total: 79,157
- Time zone: UTC+8 (ICST)
- Area code: (+62) 389
- Climate: Aw
- Website: belukab.go.id

Atambua is a town which serves as the regency seat of Belu Regency, East Nusa Tenggara Province, Indonesia.

The town stretches 8.5 km from north to south and 5 km from east to west, and is in the north of the western half of Timor Island. The town is located at an altitude of about 350 m above sea level with temperatures ranging between 23 and 35 degrees Celsius.

== Administration ==
The town has no single level of government, but consists of three of the districts of Belu Regency, each district being composed of four urban villages (kelurahan).

Kode Wilayah	Name of District (kecamatan)	Area in km^{2}	Pop'n Estimate 2024	Villages (kelurahan)
53.04.12	(Kota) Atambua (Central Atambua)	25.80	32,119	Fatubenoa, Atambua, Manumtin, Tenukiik
53.04.21	Atambua Barat (West Atambua)	22.27	20,339	Beirafu, Berdao, Tulamalae, Umanen
53.04.22	Atambua Selatan (South Atambua)	15.73	26,699	Fatukbot, Lidak, Manuaman, Rinbesi
	Total Atambua town	63.80	79,157	

== History ==
Atambua was founded by the Dutch in October 1916, having moved from Atapupu, a port village in Kakuluk Mesak District in the north of the regency. Atambua was briefly occupied by the Imperial Japanese Army from 1942 to 1943. They planted many trees, which can be seen in Hutan Jati Nenuk. After Independence, Indonesia's first president, Sukarno went to Atambua and planted more trees in the place now called Lapangan Umum. The most notable tree planted there is the banyan tree. In September 1999, more than 250,000 refugees arrived here from Timor-Leste, after their vote for independence and the following violence. As late as 2002, an estimated 60,000 refugees remained in camps.

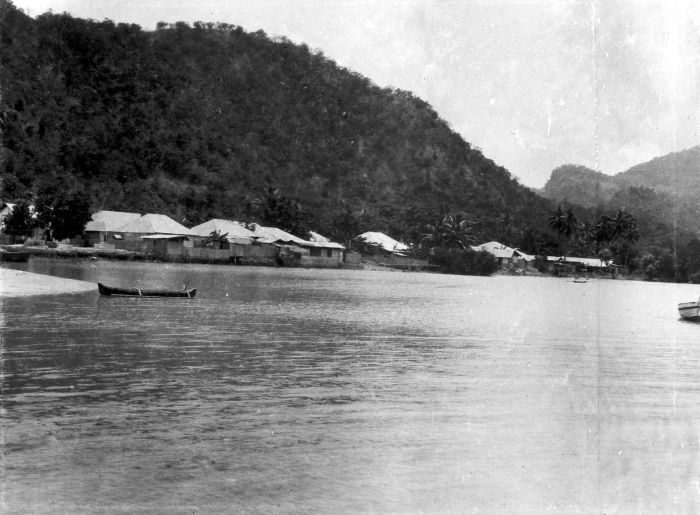
Atapupu Harbour, near Atambua town in the time of Dutch East Indies

== Transportation ==
=== Air ===
There is an airport in Atambua, A. A. Bere Tallo Airport, about 5 kilometers from the town centre. The airport's runway is 1600m long.

=== Water ===
Atambua has two sea ports, Atapupu for cargo and oil, and Teluk Gurita for passengers (ferry port). There is a weekly Atambua-Kalabahi (Alor) ferry service.

== Climate ==
Atambua has a tropical savanna climate (Aw) with moderate to little rainfall from April to October and heavy rainfall from November to March.

Climate data for Atambua
Month	Jan	Feb	Mar	Apr	May	Jun	Jul	Aug	Sep	Oct	Nov	Dec	Year
Mean daily maximum °C (°F)	28.5 (83.3)	28.2 (82.8)	28.9 (84.0)	29.2 (84.6)	28.9 (84.0)	28.2 (82.8)	27.7 (81.9)	27.9 (82.2)	28.5 (83.3)	29.3 (84.7)	29.9 (85.8)	29.1 (84.4)	28.7 (83.6)
Daily mean °C (°F)	25.7 (78.3)	25.2 (77.4)	25.5 (77.9)	25.5 (77.9)	25.1 (77.2)	24.4 (75.9)	23.6 (74.5)	23.5 (74.3)	24.1 (75.4)	25.2 (77.4)	26.5 (79.7)	26.1 (79.0)	25.0 (77.1)
Mean daily minimum °C (°F)	22.9 (73.2)	22.3 (72.1)	22.1 (71.8)	21.8 (71.2)	21.3 (70.3)	20.6 (69.1)	19.5 (67.1)	19.2 (66.6)	19.7 (67.5)	21.2 (70.2)	23.1 (73.6)	23.2 (73.8)	21.4 (70.5)
Average rainfall mm (inches)	293 (11.5)	237 (9.3)	257 (10.1)	113 (4.4)	51 (2.0)	35 (1.4)	19 (0.7)	6 (0.2)	11 (0.4)	37 (1.5)	135 (5.3)	238 (9.4)	1,432 (56.2)
Source: Climate-Data.org
