= Dili =

Capital and largest city of Timor-Leste

Dili Díli (Portuguese)
- Capital city
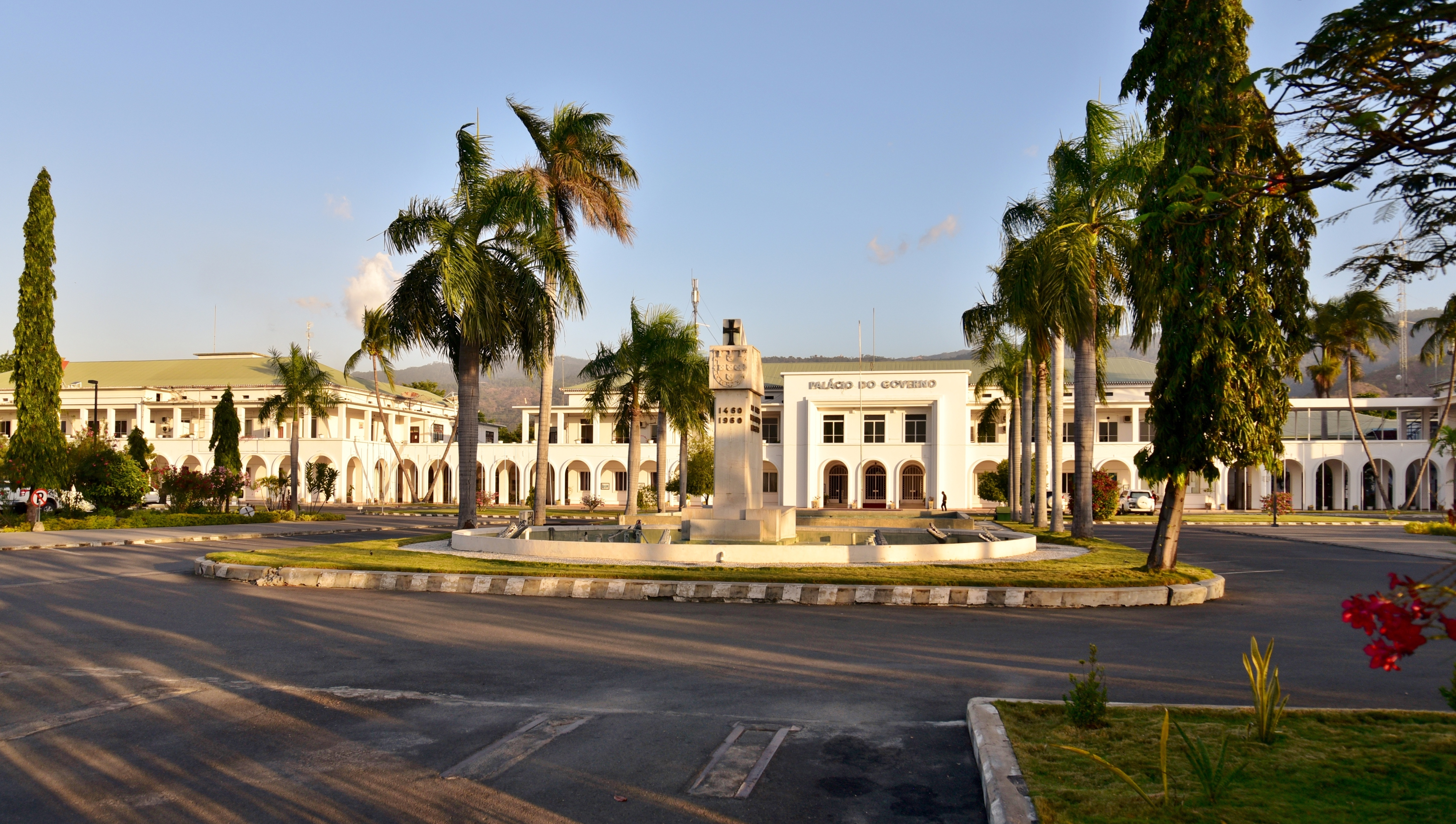
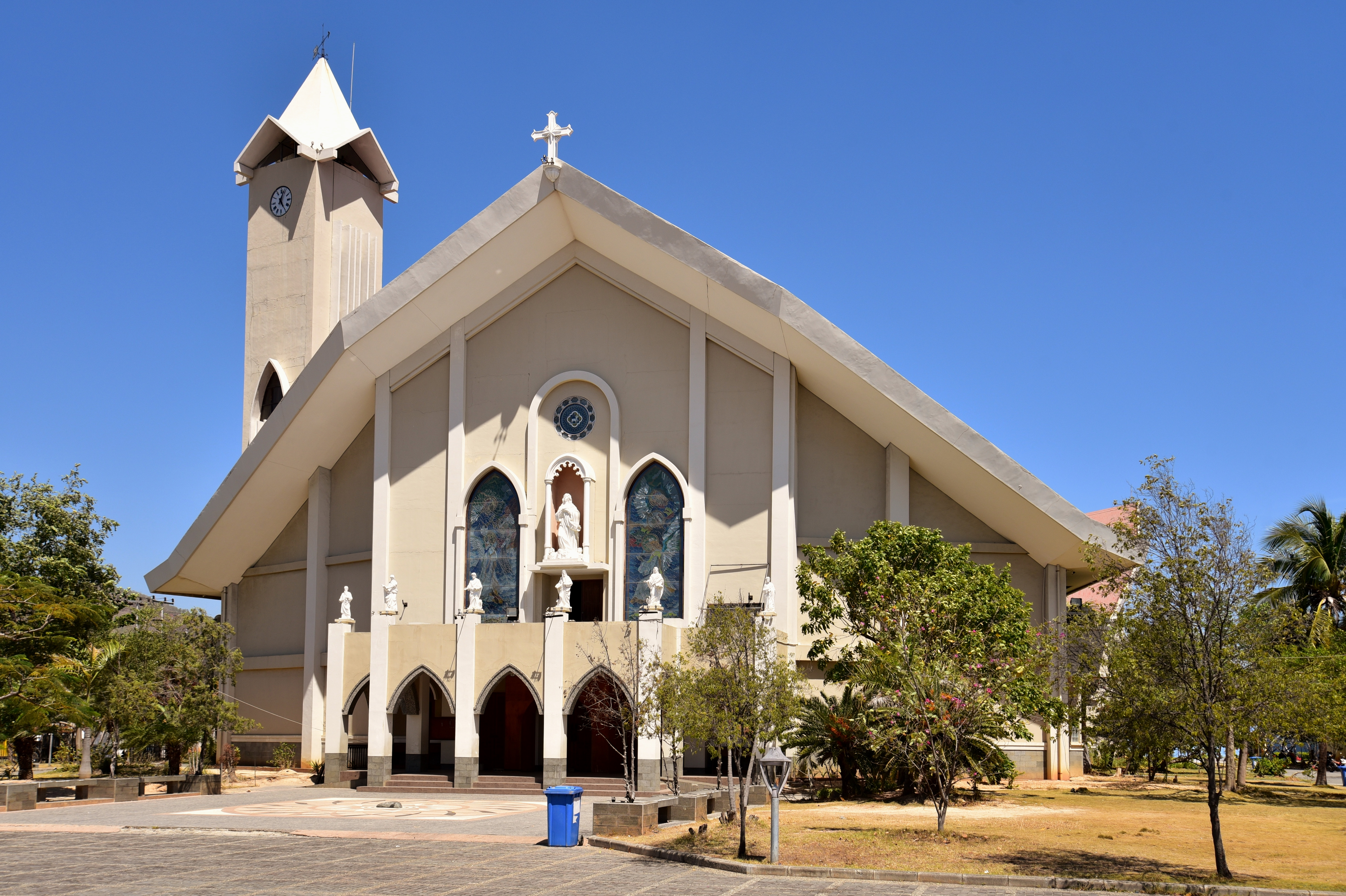
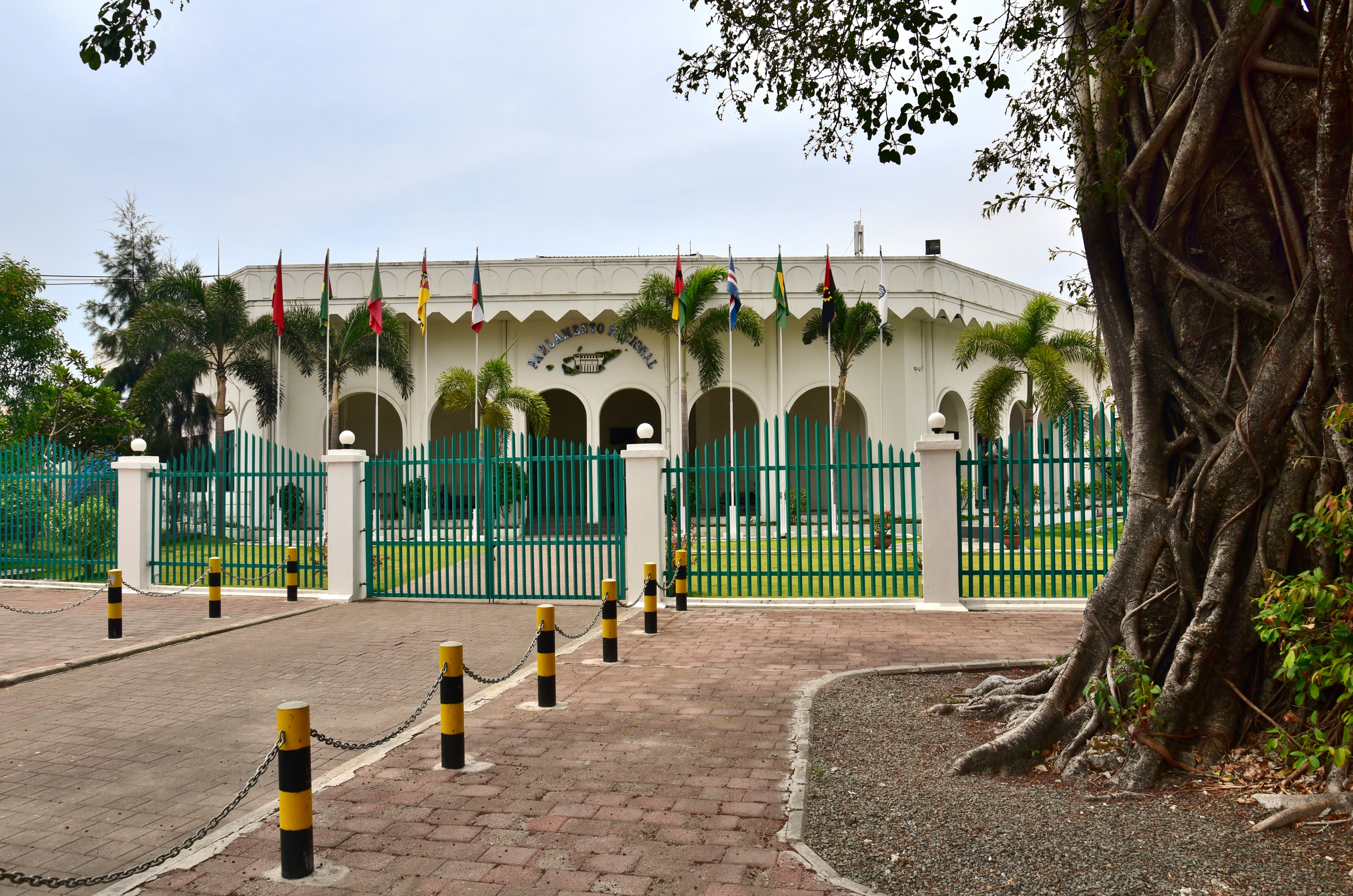
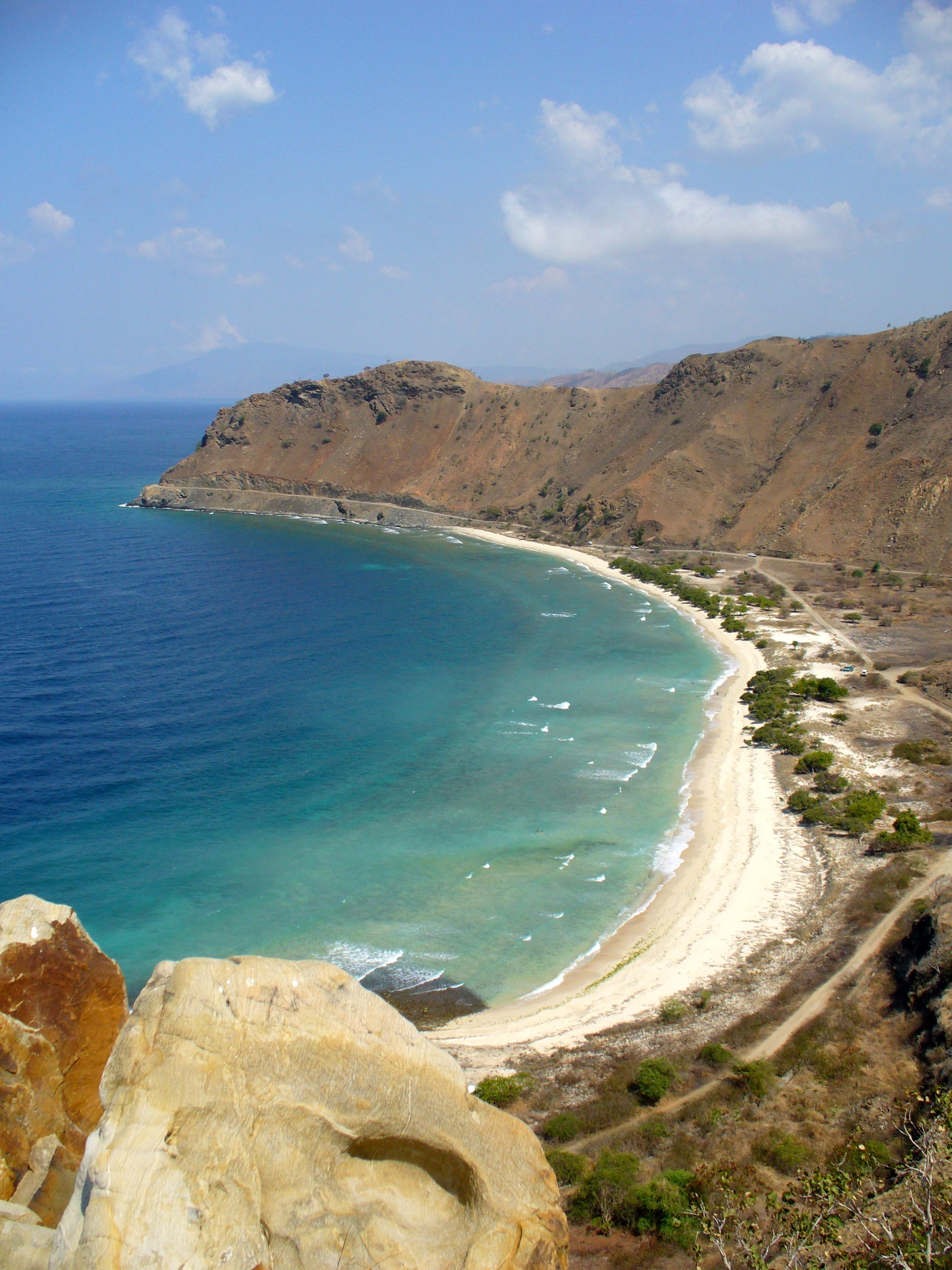
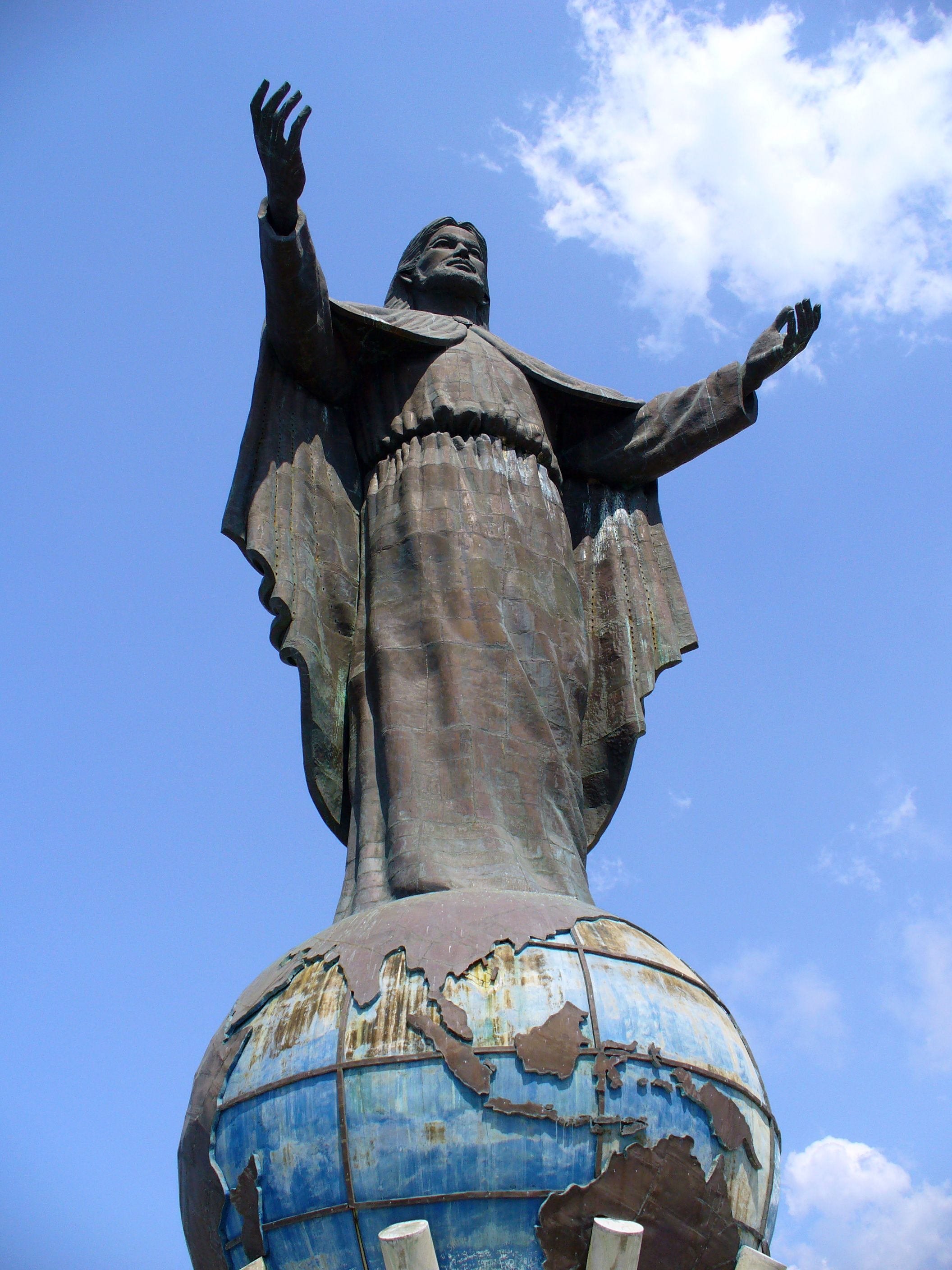
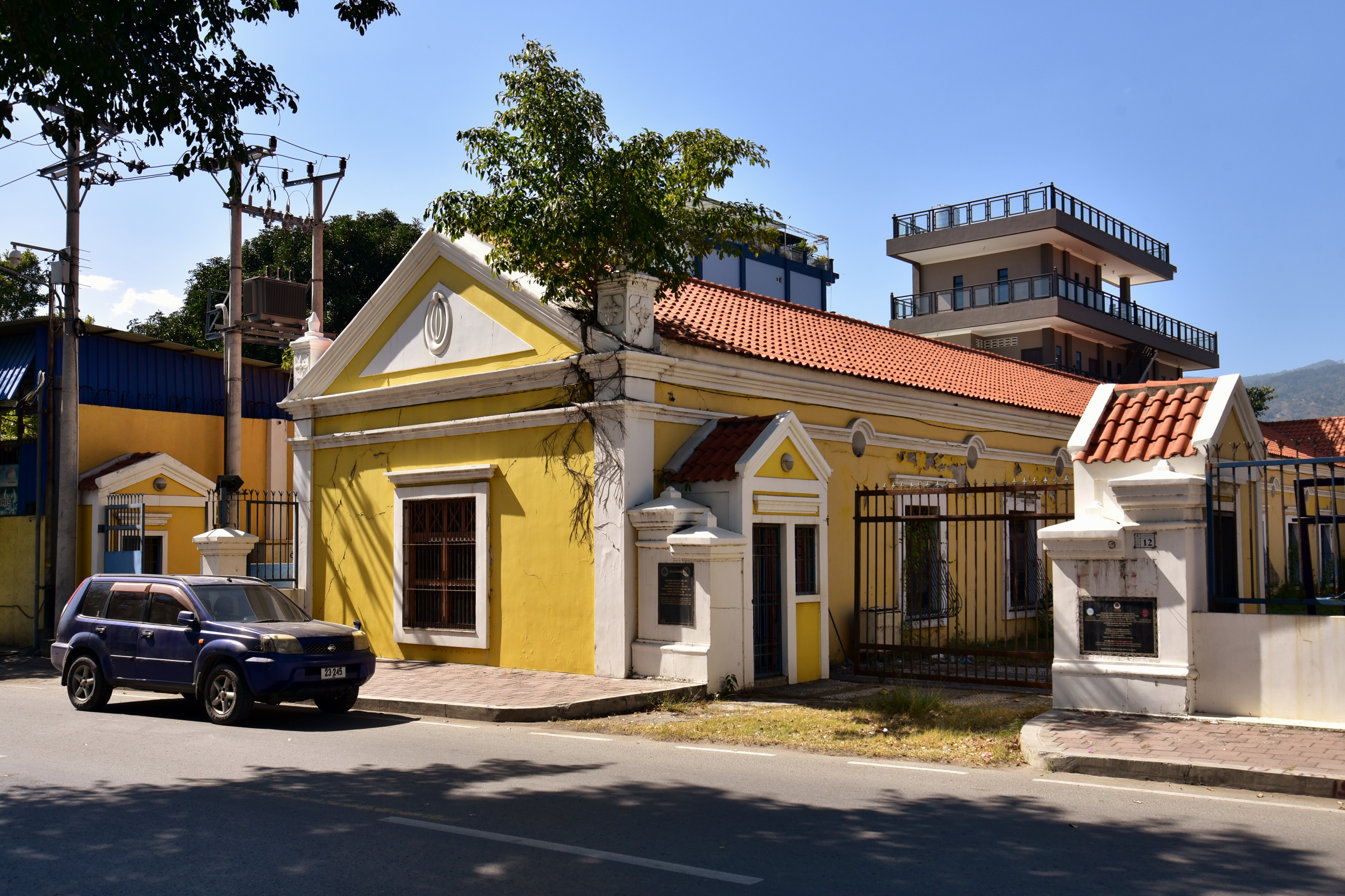
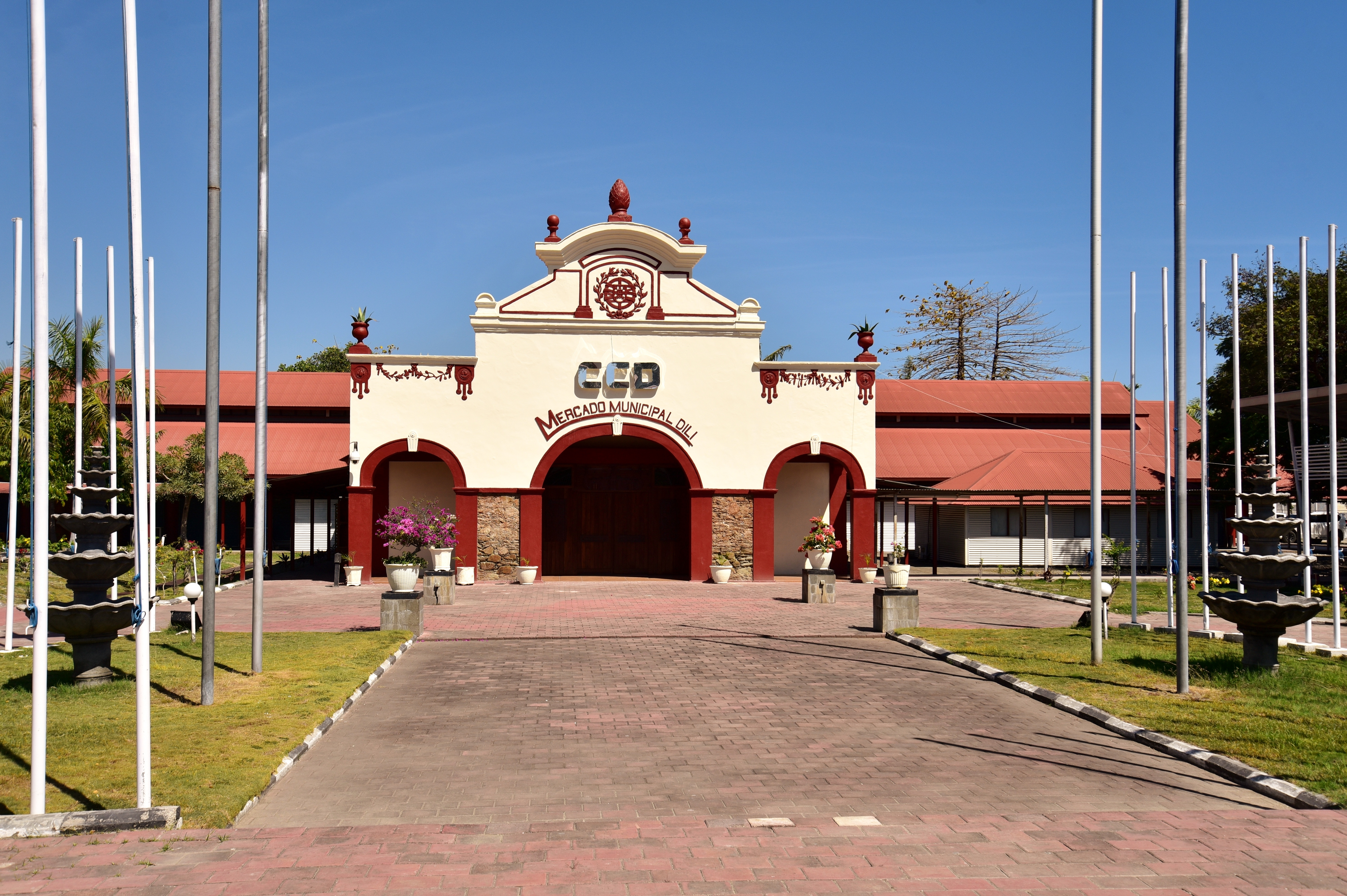
- Government Palace Immaculate Conception Cathedral National Parliament Dolok Oan Cristo Rei of Dili Casa Europa Dili Convention Centre
- Interactive map of Dili
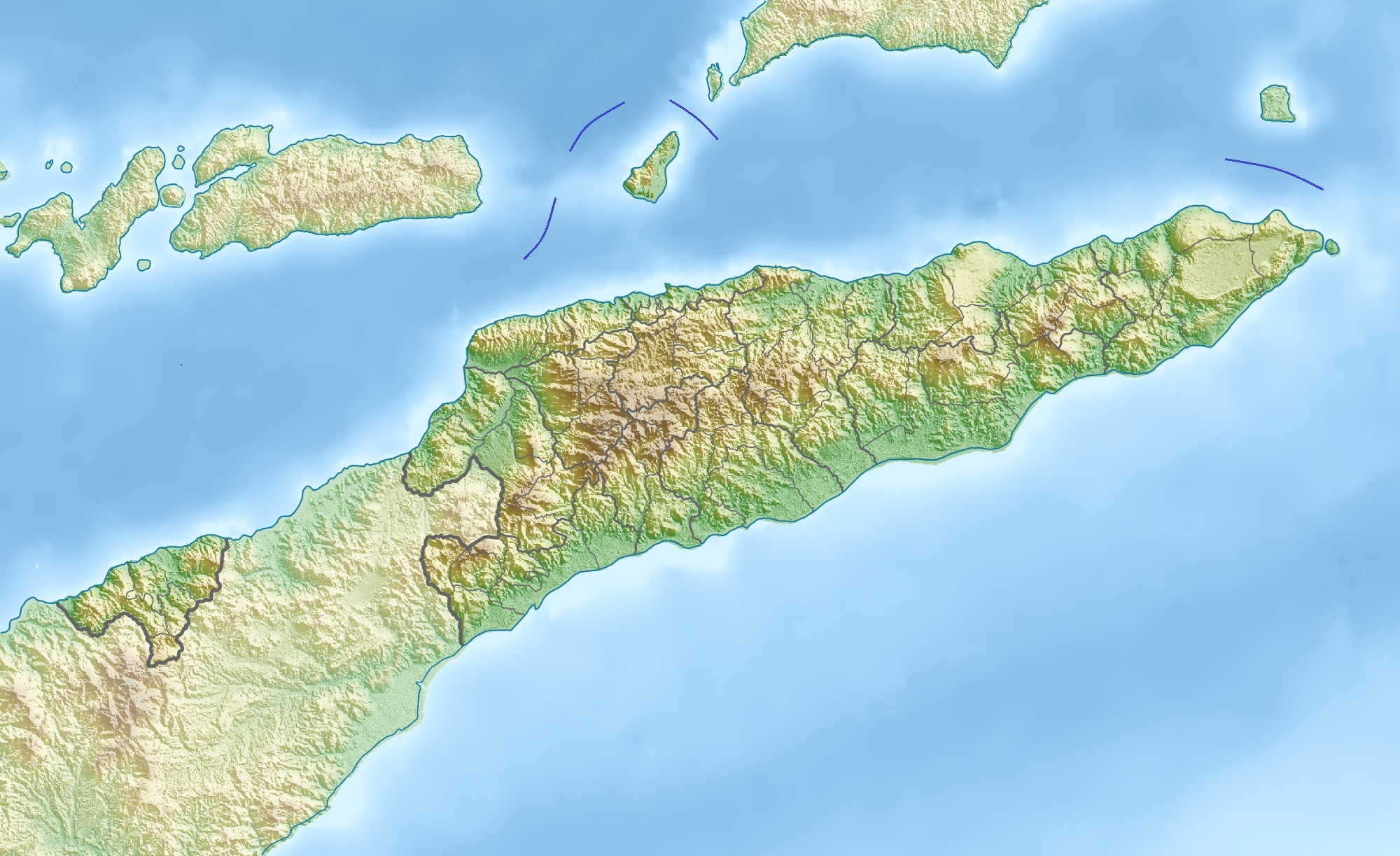
- Location within East Timor Location within Asia
- Coordinates: 08°33′13″S 125°34′42″E
- Country: Timor-Leste
- Municipality: Dili
- Capital of Portuguese Timor: 1769

Government
  - Municipal administrator: Gregório da Cunha Saldanha

Area
  - Capital city: 178.62 km^{2} (68.97 sq mi)
- Elevation: 11 m (36 ft)

Population (2023)
  - Capital city: 277,488
  - Density: 1,553.5/km^{2} (4,023.6/sq mi)
  - Metro: 324,296
- Time zone: UTC+09:00 (TLT)

Dili (Portuguese: Díli) is the capital and largest city of Timor-Leste. It lies on the northern coast of the island of Timor, in a small area of flat land hemmed in by mountains. The climate is tropical with distinct wet and dry seasons.

The city has served as the economic hub and chief port of what is now Timor-Leste since its designation as the capital of Portuguese Timor in 1769. It also serves as the capital of the Dili Municipality, which includes some rural subdivisions in addition to the urban ones that make up the city itself. Dili's growing population is relatively youthful, being mostly of working age. The local language is Tetum; however, residents include many internal migrants from other areas of the country.

The initial settlement was situated in what is now the old quarter in the eastern side of the city. Centuries of Portuguese rule were interrupted in World War II, when Dili became the site of a battle between Allied and Japanese forces. The damaged city returned to Portuguese control following the war. In 1975, a civil war between Timorese political parties broke out, leading to a declaration of independence and a subsequent invasion by Indonesia. Under Indonesian rule infrastructure in the city was developed, with landmarks such as the Immaculate Conception Cathedral and Cristo Rei of Dili being built during this time. The city expanded as its population grew to over 100,000 people.

Resistance to Indonesian rule faced violent repression, and a massacre in Dili led to international pressure culminating in an independence referendum. Following a vote for independence violence erupted in the city, destroying huge amounts of its infrastructure and leading to an exodus of refugees. A period of United Nations rule followed, during which international agencies began the reconstruction of the city. Dili became the capital of an independent Timor-Leste in 2002. A period of violence in 2006 saw another period of infrastructure damage and population displacement. In 2009, the government launched the City of Peace campaign to reduce tensions. As the population has continued to grow and the original site of the city has filled up, the urban area has expanded into coastal areas to the east and west of the main city.

Infrastructure in Dili continues to be developed; the city was the first location in Timor-Leste to see 24 hours of electricity, although its water infrastructure remains relatively limited. Levels of education are higher than the national average, and the country's universities are located in the city. An international port and airport lie within the city limits. Most economic activity comes from the tertiary sector and public employment. To further build the economy, the Timorese government has been developing the tourism-based potential of the city, focusing on cultural, environmental, and historical attractions.

== History ==
=== Initial Portuguese settlement ===
Former coat of arms

Dili has played a central role in the history of Timor-Leste. However, early records about Timor, especially before the 1700s, are sparse. The tumultuous history of the city has resulted in a great deal of information being lost; archives in the city were destroyed in 1779, 1890, 1975, and 1999.

The island of Timor was possibly known as a source for sandalwood in the 15th century. The first recorded Portuguese voyage to the island from Portuguese Malacca occurred in 1516, returning with sandalwood. In 1521, sandalwood was left out of a list of products under royal monopoly, leaving most trade with Timor in the hands of private enterprises. Portuguese and Spanish interest in the island increased in the 1520s, with regular trade established by 1524. In the late 1500s, administrative officials began to be appointed to nearby Solor with jurisdiction over that island and Timor, signifying increasing state interest in Portuguese activities there.

The Netherlands began to compete for control of the island in 1613, especially in the west. A rebellion in 1629 forced the Portuguese off the island for three years. In 1641, a number of kings in Timor converted to Catholicism while seeking Portuguese protection. This introduced a political dimension to Portuguese influence, which had previously been primarily economic. Timor became administratively separated from Solor in 1646, although the exact administrative structure is unknown. It received its first dedicated governor in 1702, who resided in Lifau. This reflected the growing importance of Timor compared to nearby Flores. 1749 saw Dutch military forces take control over large portions of the island, broadly reflecting current borders.

In 1769, as Lifau came under the increasing influence of powerful local families collectively known as the Topasses, the Portuguese governor António José Teles de Meneses moved the administration and 1,200 people east to establish a new capital. It was originally intended that the administration be set up at Vemasse further east, but perhaps because of the favourable geography, a settlement was established at Dili instead. This was at the time part of the Motael kingdom, whose leader was friendly with the Portuguese authorities. The governor occupied an existing fortified structure, and with the assistance of the Motael leader began to construct a new settlement. The area surrounding the settlement was wetlands fed by rivers from the mountains and proved conducive to rice cultivation. A wall was built to separate the coastal city from wetlands to its south. The initial settlement was divided between three populations, one mainly Portuguese, one of Mestiços and locals from other Portuguese colonies (which became Bidau), and one for troops from a kingdom thought to be in Flores.

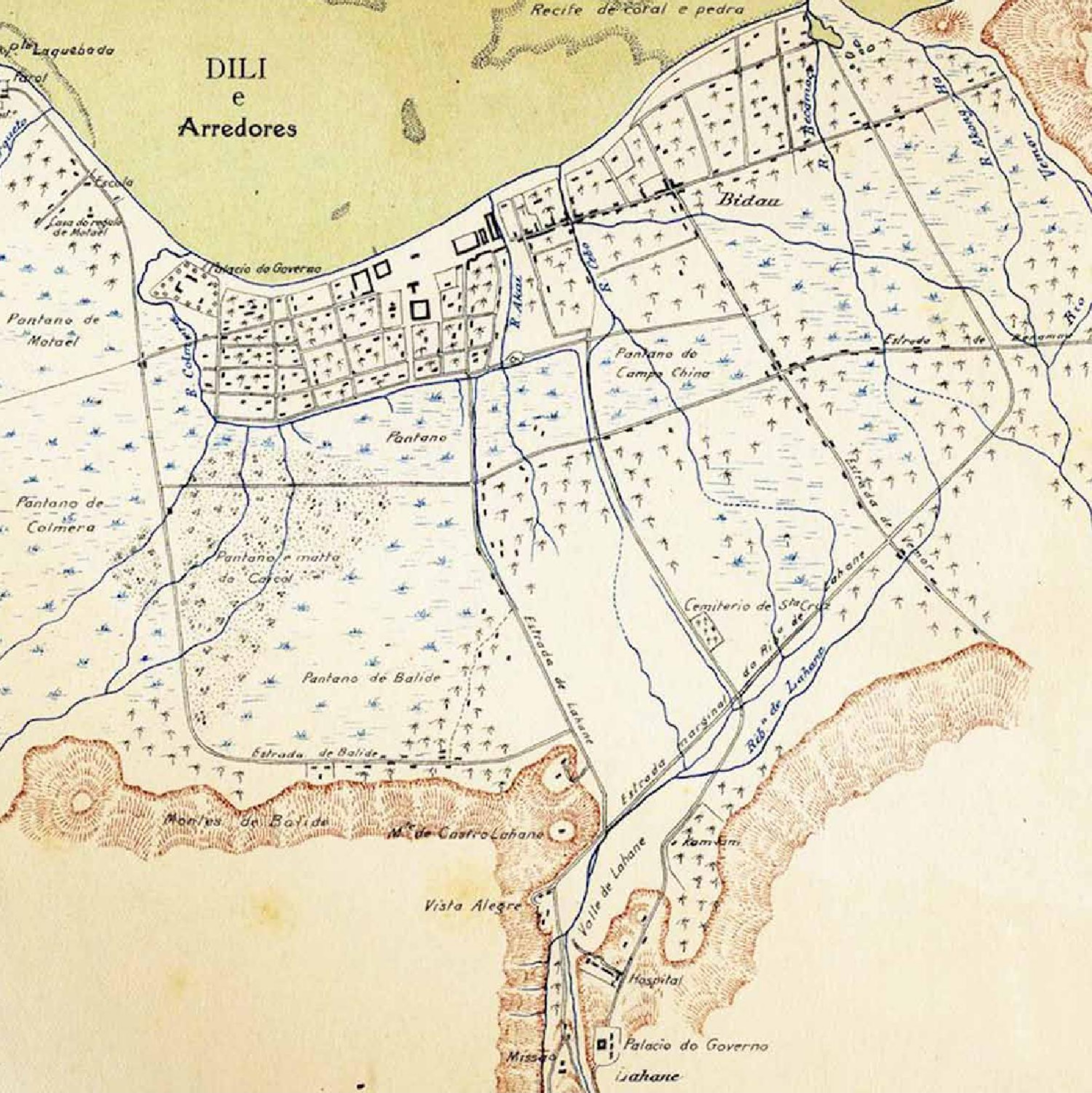
An old map of Dili, showing the old city separated from Lahane to the south by marshes

From 1788 to 1790, a civil war broke out between the governor in Dili and an official based in Manatuto, which was resolved upon the arrival of a new governor. In response to Dutch provocations, a permanent military force was established in 1818. Some Europeans settled in Lahane to the south, beyond the wetland area. Significant construction was undertaken under governor José Maria Marques, who arrived in 1834 and rebuilt the settlement along a grid. This saw expansion along the coast, but also southwards as the wetlands between the original city and Lahane were channelised and drained. A road extended to Lahane and Dare. The rebuilding saw the settlement being centred on its port, with the immediate port area containing trade facilities, church buildings, military buildings, government buildings, the residence of the governor and his deputy, a residence for a representative of the Motael kingdom, and a residence for the Queen of Manatuto. Of these, only the church and the Finance Deputy's house used masonry. To the east of this core was Bidau and a Chinese settlement, to the west was the main settlement of the Motael kingdom.

In 1844 Timor, along with Macau and Solor, was removed from the jurisdiction of Portuguese India, with the three areas becoming a new Portuguese province. A few years later in 1850, Portuguese Timor was removed from the jurisdiction of the governor of Macau, before being returned to the jurisdiction of Portuguese India in 1856. When English naturalist and explorer Alfred Russel Wallace visited in the 1860s, he wrote that the governor's house was "merely a low whitewashed cottage", and that all other buildings appeared to be mud and thatch. At the time swamps and mudflats surrounded the town, which did not extend to the mountains surrounding it. More permanent buildings of one or two stories were constructed throughout the late 19th century. A new church building was built in 1877.

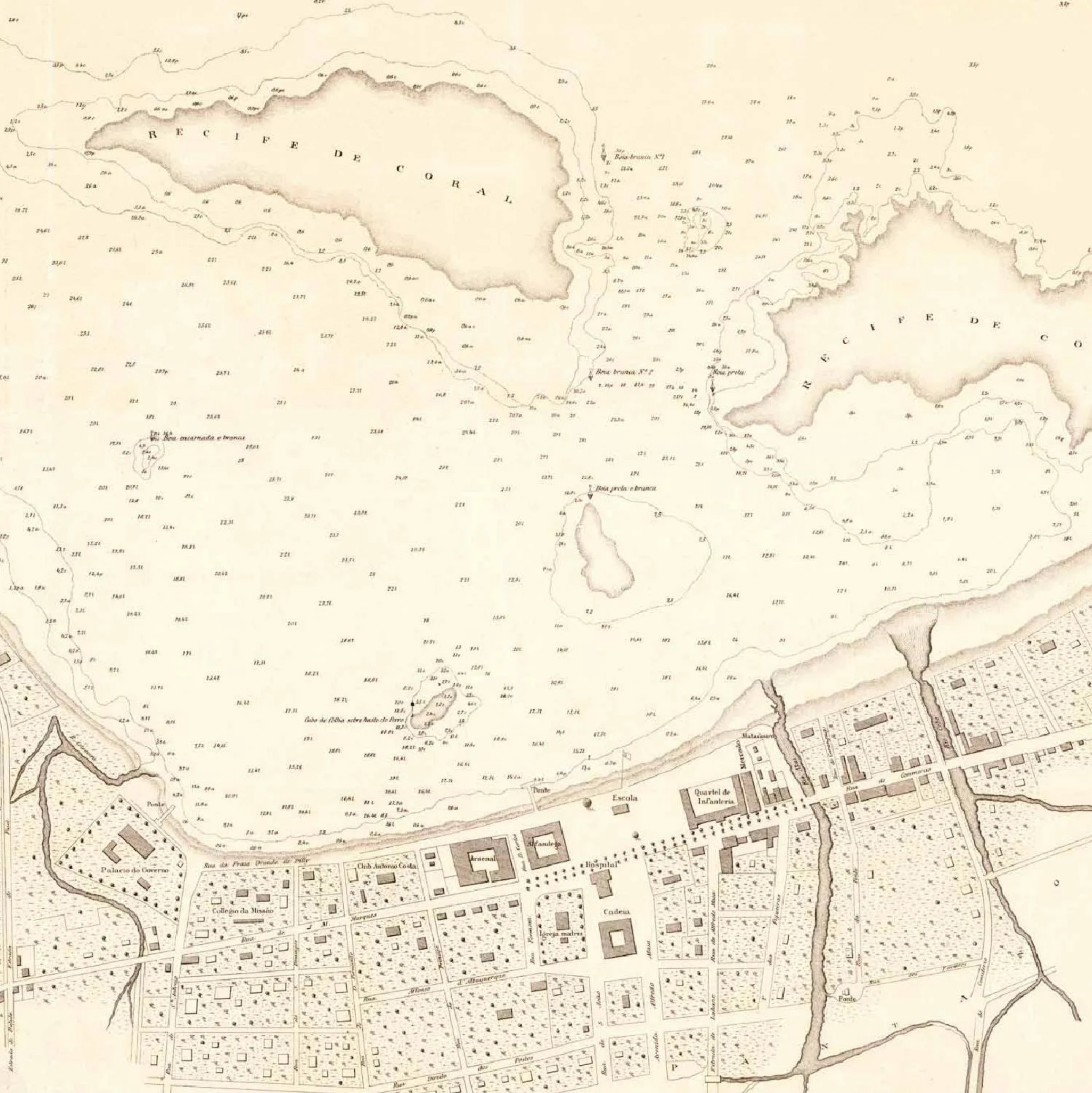
1895 port and city plan

A revolt to the east led to the city being isolated in 1861; however, the revolt was defeated by the Portuguese and their Timorese allies. In 1863, Dili was declared a city (although the news may not have arrived to the city until the next year), and East Timor became directly subordinate to the Lisbon government. In 1866 the territory was again put under the jurisdiction of Macau. An 1887 mutiny in Dili led to the death of the governor at the time. The territory was separated from Macau for the last time in 1896, again coming directly under the jurisdiction of Lisbon, and becoming a full province in 1909. Another notable revolt took place in the years after the 1910 republican revolution in Portugal. The republican government downgraded the status of its overseas provinces to colonies. A civil government was established in 1913.

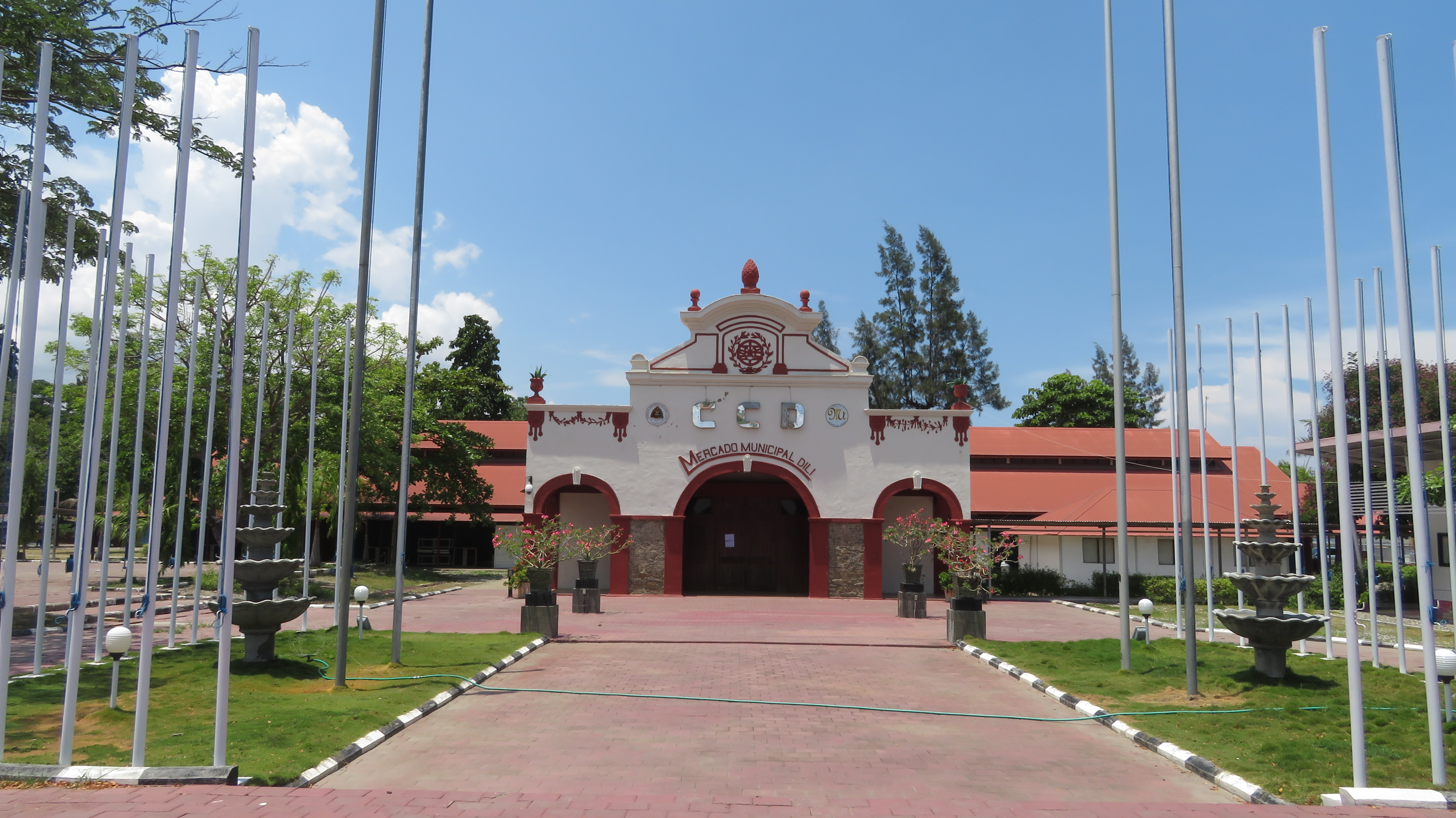
Former Market Hall built by the Portuguese

Permanent structures in Portuguese style continued to be constructed into the 20th century. A new town hall was built from 1912 to 1915. The main church was demolished in 1933, and a new cathedral opened in its place in 1937. (This cathedral was later destroyed by Allied bombing in the Second World War.) Four distinct residential districts developed around the city core. Bidau was the largest, and Benamauc joined it on the eastern side. Caicole developed to the south between the city and Lahane. Colmera developed as a commercial area to the west with a large number of Muslim traders. Motael continued to develop, becoming the site of the city's lighthouse. Motael Church began to be built in 1901. Inland to the southwest, a Chinese cemetery was established, and beyond that a military area known as Taibesse. Lahane also saw significant development in the early 20th century, with its east and west side separated by a river. As the administrative structures developed, Dili became part of the Dili municipality in 1940, the first municipal administration to be created. At the time the municipality was larger, including what is now the Aileu Municipality.

=== Destruction, reconstruction, and Indonesian rule ===
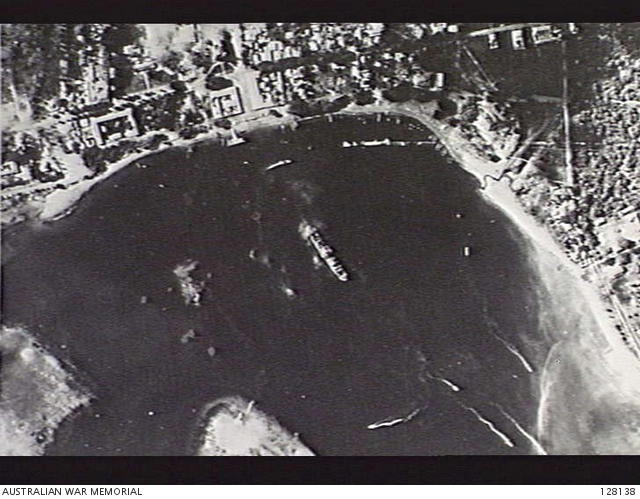
A Japanese ship off Dili in 1943

During World War II, Portugal and its colonies remained neutral, but the Allies saw East Timor as a potential target for Japanese invasion. Upon the outbreak of the Pacific War in 1941, Australian and Dutch troops were sent to Dili despite Portuguese objections. In response, the Japanese invaded Dili as part of a two-pronged invasion of Timor. The city had been mostly abandoned prior to the invasion, and allied forces retreated further into the island. The Japanese left the Portuguese governor nominally in position, but took over administration. Much of Dili was destroyed during the war, from the initial Japanese invasion and from later allied bombings. Japanese forces on the island of Timor surrendered to Australian forces at the end of the war. Following the surrender, an Australian official travelled to Dili where on 23 September 1945 he informed the Portuguese governor of the Japanese surrender.

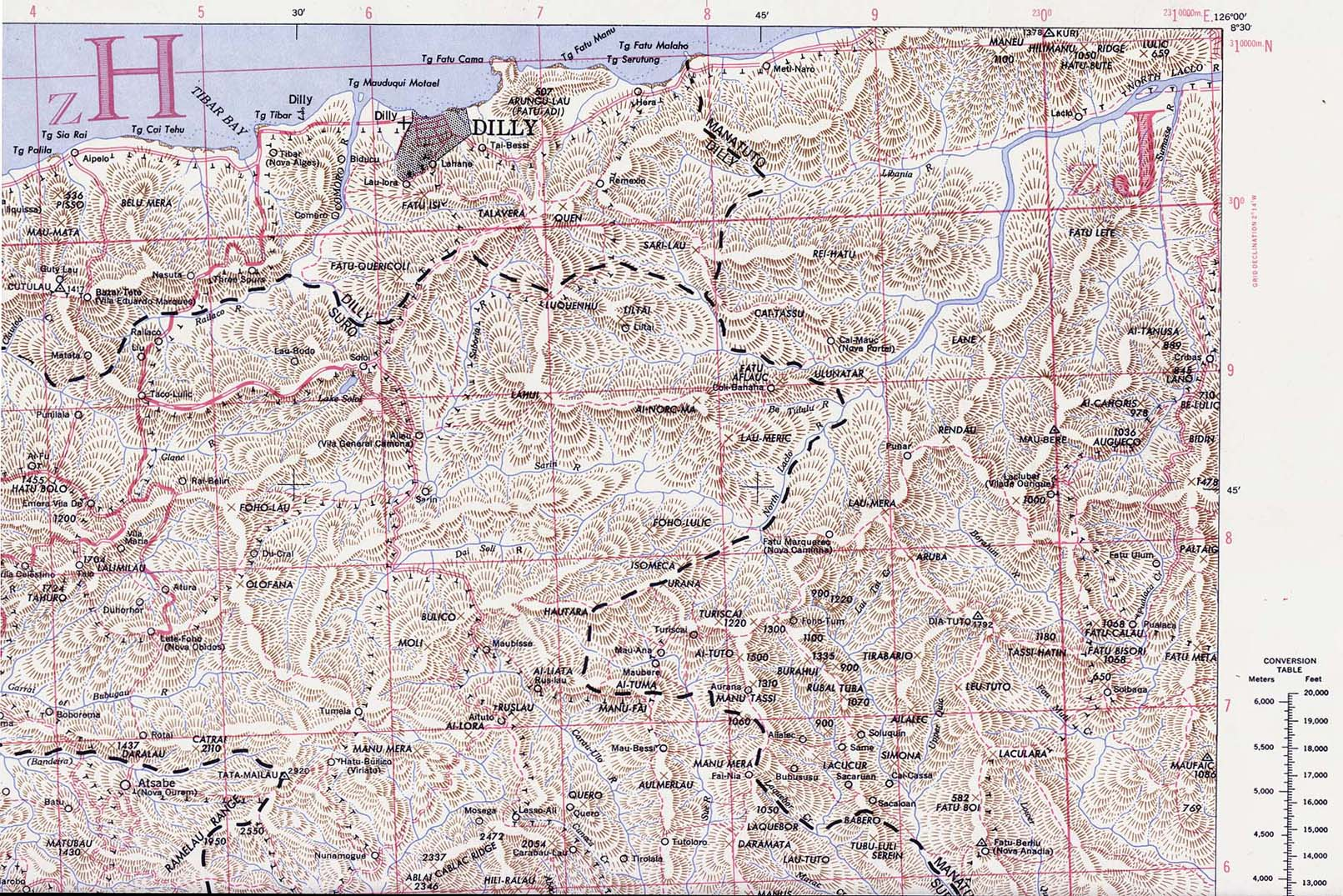
Dili in the 1940s was what today is the old city

Following the Second World War, Dili covered what today is the old core of the city, within the sucos of Acadiru Hun, Bemori, Bidau Lecidere, Caicoli, Colmera, Culu Hun, Gricenfor, Motael, and Santa Cruz. Portuguese Timor became a full part of Following the initial post-war reconstruction of Dili's immediately critical infrastructure, an urban plan was developed in 1951 covering urban layout, road development, zoning, and building regulations. The plan envisioned separate neighbourhoods for Europeans, mestiços, Chinese, Arabs, and Timorese, and assumed there would be further rural-urban migration. Both this plan and later revisions in 1968 and 1972 assumed that the Timorese population would live on the edges of the city yet work near the centre. This plan was not completed, and the city remained under-developed, with low density and where property outside of the central area was still built on with flimsy materials and used for subsistence cultivation. The second five-year development plan, which ran from 1959 to 1964, saw the reconstruction of the Port of Dili and a small amount of transport infrastructure.

A 1950 census found that the population of Dili was about 6,000 people, half 'civilised' (considered by Portuguese authorities to have sufficiently adopted Portuguese culture), including Mestiço, 'civilised' natives, Europeans, and other foreigners such as Goans and those from Portugal's African colonies. This was slightly over 1% of the total population of the colony. The 1960 census recorded the population of Dili to be about 7,000 people. By 1970, the urban population reached around 17,000. The city did not extend far beyond the area surrounding the port, and the population did not exceed 30,000 before 1975.

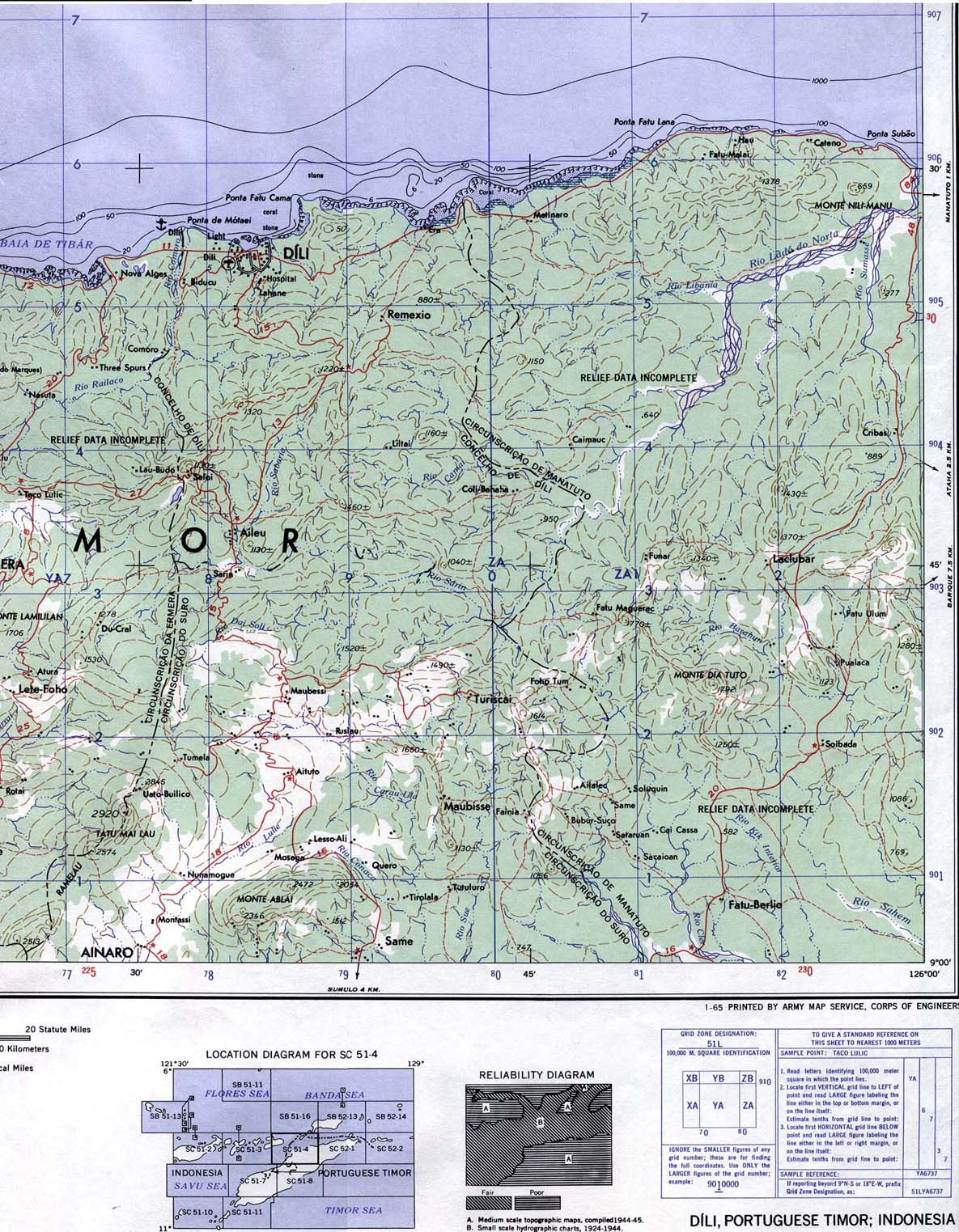
1965 map of Dili

Portuguese Timor became a full part of Portugal in 1951, although despite being made citizens of Portugal this did not bring the locals any political power. Governance remained in the control of Lisbon. The Portuguese Overseas Organic Law of 1963 created the first Legislative Council of the territory, which was given some of the powers formerly held by the governor. It also theoretically extended voting rights to the 'uncivilised', although property and tax requirements meant most were still unable to vote.

The 1974 Carnation Revolution in Portugal created immediate change in East Timor, with new political parties forming with the goal of independence from Portugal. Relationships between these new parties was fractious. Some, particularly the Timorese Democratic Union (UDT), advocated union with Indonesia. On 11 August 1975, the UDT initiated a coup. UDT control was limited outside of Dili, and on 20 August the opposing Fretilin party began its attempt to seize the city. Some houses were set on fire to assist the defence; however, after some days Fretilin succeeded in taking control of the city. The last Portuguese governor fled Dili for Atauro Island on 26 August, as the civil war continued. On 28 November, Fretilin declared independence in a ceremony in Dili. On 7 December, Indonesia landed paratroopers in the city and amphibious forces to its west, as part of an invasion of East Timor, leading many to flee the city.

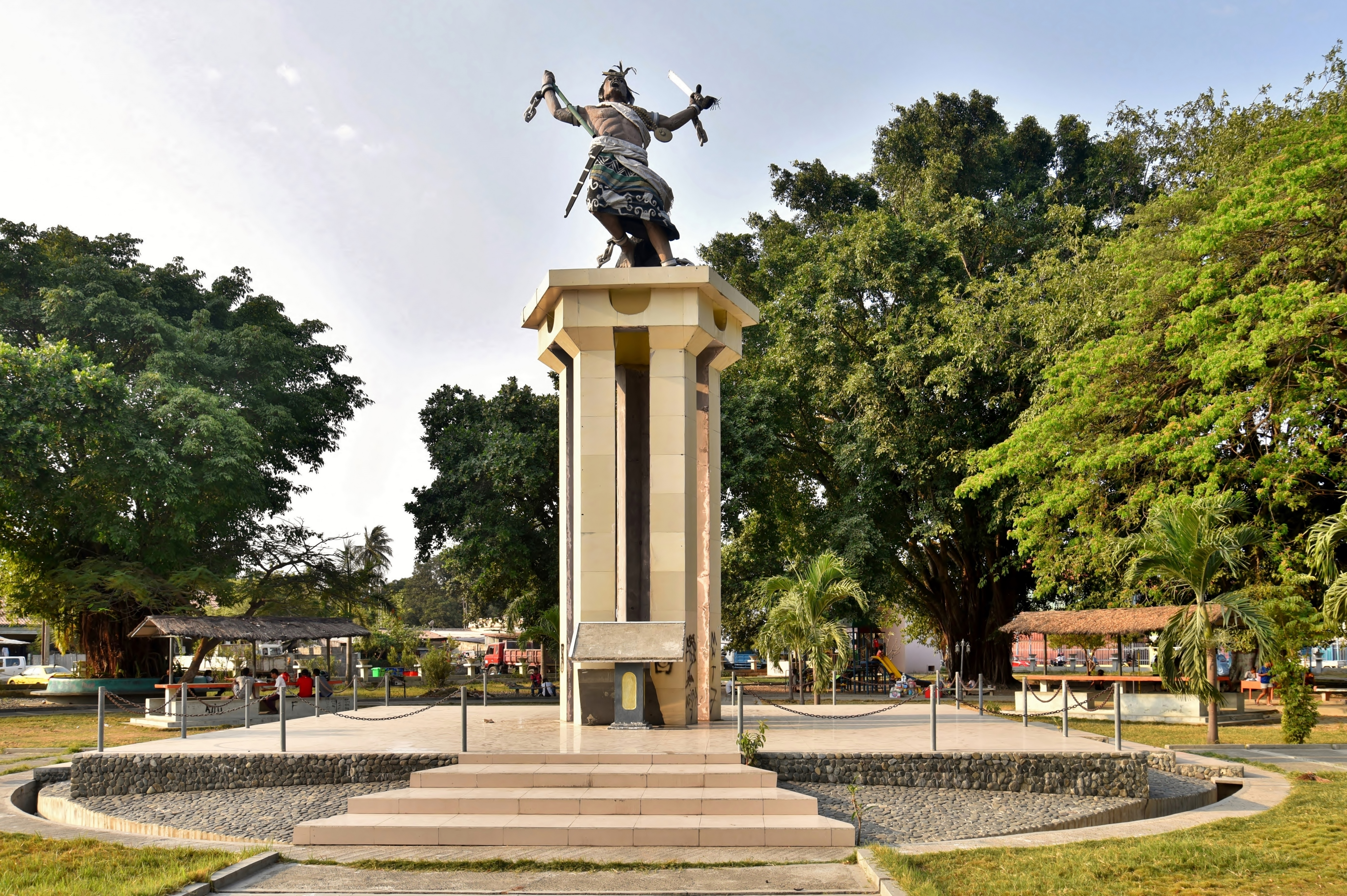
The integration monument was built by Indonesian authorities to celebrate freedom from European rule

This invasion brought the territory under Indonesian rule. On 17 July 1976, Indonesia annexed East Timor, which it designated its 27th province. Indonesia continued to administer the territory from Dili, continuing formerly Portuguese use of places such as the Balide Comarca prison and Lahane Hospital. Despite Indonesian attempts to restrict rural-urban migration, the population of Dili continued to grow, reaching 80,000 people in 1985, and over 100,000 in 1999, and economic growth for the territory remained centred in Dili. Part of the internal migration was due to people fleeing the continuing conflict in rural areas. Indonesia developed the city's infrastructure, partly as an attempt to win over the population. Structures and monuments built during this time include the Immaculate Conception Cathedral, the Integration Statue commemorating the end of Portuguese rule, and the Cristo Rei of Dili. Nonetheless, many in the city continued to support the Fretilin-led resistance, providing a communications link between the rebels and the rest of the world, and setting up safe houses in the city. Others who supported Indonesian rule became informants, known as mau'hu. By the 1990s, urban sprawl had taken up much of the available flat land around the original settlement.

In the 1980s, resistance to Indonesian rule grew among youth in the city. Nonetheless, towards the end of the decade Indonesia began allowing foreign tourists access to the city, with the entire province previously being restricted. A visit by Pope John Paul II in 1989 was interrupted by independence activists. On 12 November 1991, Indonesian forces were filmed shooting at a funeral procession. This led to global condemnation of Indonesia's rule in East Timor, increasing pressure for East Timorese self-determination. The 1997 Asian financial crisis along with a drought related to an El Niño event led to profound food insecurity, worse for Dili than any other city in Indonesia. The crisis also precipitated the resignation of Indonesian President Suharto, whose successor, B. J. Habibie, soon approved a referendum on East Timorese independence. Outbreaks of violence from pro-Indonesian militia occurred throughout the country in the months leading up to the vote. In August 1999, East Timor voted for independence.

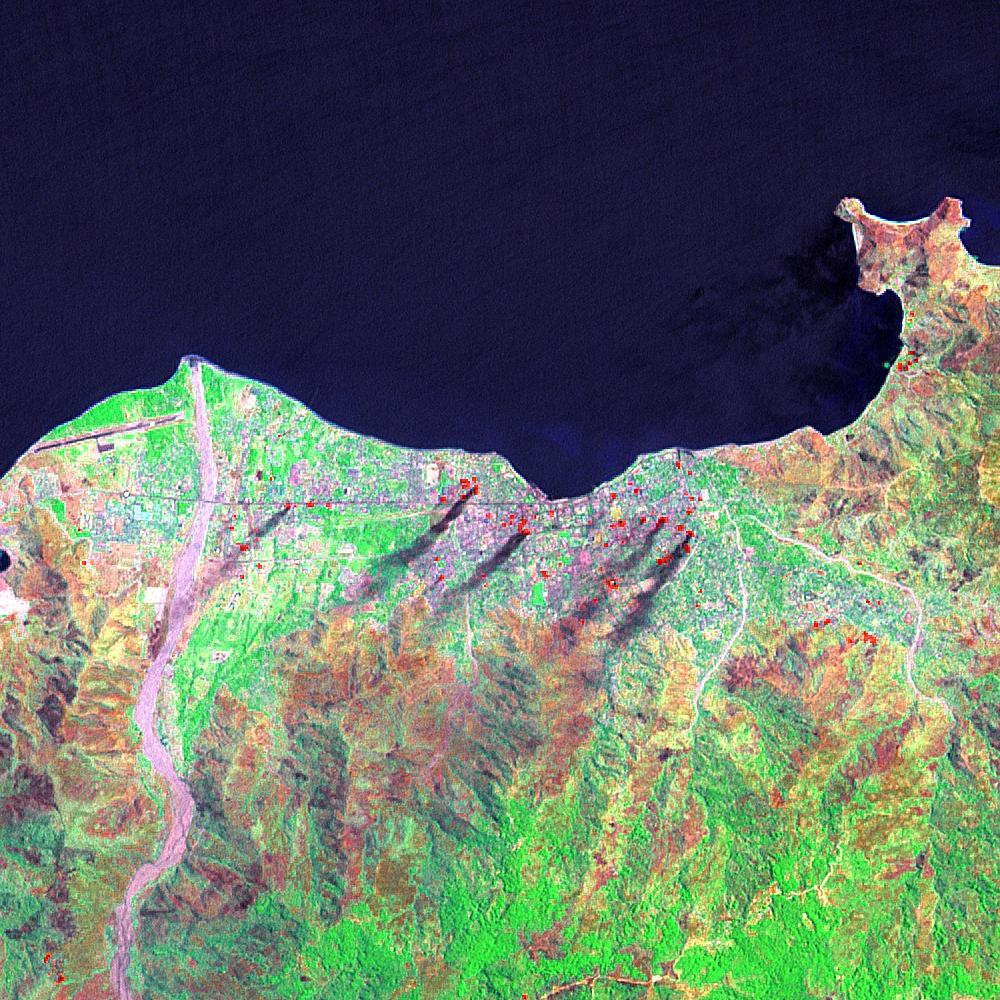
Fires burning in Dili on 8 September 1999, during a period of violence following the independence referendum

The vote led to a period of extreme violence, as pro-Indonesian militia were unchecked by the Indonesian military that was meant to be providing security. On 4 September, when the result was announced, Indonesian police began to leave Dili. In the first 48 hours, international media organisations present in the city reported 145 deaths. Most foreigners were evacuated. Violence continued for several days, causing significant damage to infrastructure and housing in the city. Administrative buildings were looted, and much of the city was destroyed by fire. 120,000 people became refugees. International pressure grew for an international peacekeeping force to replace the Indonesian military, which Indonesia agreed to on 12 September. On 14 September, the UN evacuated refugees that had been sheltering in its Dili compound to Australia. The Australian-led International Force East Timor arrived on 20 September.

=== Growth under UN rule and independence ===
Dili in 1999

Dili continued to grow under UN rule. As Indonesian infrastructure investment outside of Dili was not replicated by the UN government, leaving it to deteriorate, population growth was driven in part due to internal migration from these areas to the city. Housing left abandoned by Indonesians in 1999 was occupied by squatters. This was most common in the western areas of the city. Most inward migration during this period was from eastern areas of the country. Population growth combined with a poor economy led to an increase of urban poverty and unemployment, especially amongst youth. This was despite the city reaping 80% of the economic benefits of reconstruction efforts; 65% of direct jobs created by the UN were in Dili, a figure that rose to 80% when including indirect jobs.

Following the beginning of UN rule, the population of Dili grew by over 10% annually. This was a result of both rural-urban migration, and a baby boom driven by the country having the highest fertility rate in the world. By 2004, the population had reached 173,541 people, with unemployment at 26.9% overall, and 43.4% for men aged 15–29. Around half of employment for these young men was informal. In 2005 a new urban master plan was developed by a group based in the Faculty of Architecture of the Technical University of Lisbon. Issues with food security reoccurred periodically throughout the early years of independence. From 1990 to 2014, agricultural use of the flat land around Dili is thought to have decreased by around 40%, replaced by horticulture and aquaculture in the east and by urban areas in the west. Wetlands have also further decreased, drained and built upon.

By 2006, Dili produced half of the country's non-oil GDP. It was also receiving two-thirds of government expenditure, and 80% of goods and services. However, economic benefits were distributed unequally. 1999 saw the end of Indonesian subsidises of core food products, which alongside infrastructure destruction led to rapid inflation. Under UN rule, the use of the US dollar and the purchasing power of international organisations led to price increases. Together, these factors led to extremely high costs of living. Electricity cost four times as much as it did in Indonesia, averaging $15 per household. Telecommunications and petrol similarly grew in price compared to Indonesia. By 2006 Dili had the eighth-highest living costs of any city in Asia, despite the country's having Asia's lowest GDP. At this point, the city had around 300 youth groups, some of which were involved in the informal economy. These groups, driven by unemployment, were often connected to former guerrillas and current politicians. Many developed identities reflecting the regional origins of their members, especially with regards to the broad distinction between those from the east and those from the west.

In April 2006, disputes within the military between a leadership mostly from the east of the country and soldiers mostly from the west spilled over into street violence in Dili. Disputes over housing, again mostly between groups from the east and west, contributed to property destruction. Most of the 150,000 people displaced were from Dili, including about half of the city's residents. Around 72,000 people ended up in camps, while 80,000 fled to rural areas. Rice prices in the city increased by half by October 2006, and then almost doubled again by February 2007. Foreign military intervention was needed to restore order.

A National Recovery Strategy was put in place following the 2007 national election to return these people. In 2008, around 30,000 people displaced from Dili remained in camps, while 70,000 continued to live with friends or family. Continuing unrest led to the attempted assassinations of the country's president and prime minister. By 2009 most displaced people had returned to the city, and the camps were officially closed by the end of the year. However, some community tensions remained. In a couple of areas, there were two or three fights a week between opposing youth groups. Nonetheless, large-scale violence did not return. Mediation teams were utilised to assist in the resettlement of some displaced people to their previous homes.

In May 2009, the year-long Dili City of Peace campaign was launched by Jose Ramos-Horta. The initiative was created to build unity and prevent violence, with the 2006 East Timorese crisis in mind. The campaign included dialogues between different sectors of Timorese society, a cycling tour, a Dili marathon, and a reforestation initiative. Focusing the peace campaign on Dili reflects the influence it has on the entire country, with the government expecting its impacts would extend beyond the city itself. The Latelek (Bridge) Project was instituted from 2010 to 2012 by some organs of the Catholic Church to improve community cohesion, reintegrating previously displaced individuals with those who had remained. Other programs were initiated by the government and NGOs to tackle issues such as skills development, youth engagement, and women's empowerment. Some sucos developed community laws to reduce violence.

The development of the city since independence has led to many sites being replaced or repurposed. In 2009 the area around the Indonesian-built Integration Monument was redesignated as the 5 May Park, the date upon which it was agreed East Timor could hold its independence referendum. A 1960s hotel, Hotel Turismo, which had been a site of independence activities, was demolished in 2010 and rebuilt. The former Dili regency police headquarters has been demolished and replaced by the cultural centre of the Indonesian embassy. By 2010 the municipal population reached 234,026 people, of which 210,250 lived in urban areas. In 2018 the population reached 281,000 people. During a period of COVID-19 restrictions, the city was hit by the worst flood in 50 years in April 2021.

== Geography ==
Land use within Dili's urban area as of 2014
1. Residential (49.0%)
2. Commercial (5.30%)
3. Industry (1.90%)
4. Public (6.20%)
5. Military (0.50%)
6. Infrastructure (2.60%)
7. Religious (1.00%)
8. Roads (8.10%)
9. Agriculture (7.20%)
10. Open (10.2%)
11. Water (8.00%)

Dili lies on the northern coast of the island of Timor, which is among the eastern Lesser Sunda Islands and lies in the UTC+9 timezone. Offshore is the Ombai Strait of the Savu Sea. To the south is the central mountain range running through Timor, which extends north to the coast on the west and east surrounding the core city. The underlying ground is predominately limestone and marine clay.

The precise location of the city is around 8°35′S, 125°36′E. The city lies mostly within the larger Dili Municipality, whose total area was 367 square kilometres (142 sq mi) when including Atauro Island, north of Dili, which was formerly part of the municipality before becoming a separate municipality on 1 January 2022. The municipalities bordering Dili are Aileu, Liquiçá, and Manatuto. The municipality contains 31 sucos, divided into 241 aldeias. The urban area of the city of Dili extends through four of the Dili Municipality's Administrative Posts, Cristo Rei, Dom Aleixo, Nain Feto, and Vera Cruz. 18 sucos within these are considered urban, and this urban area is perhaps 48 square kilometres (19 sq mi) large. The wider urban area extends west into the Tibar suco of the Bazartete Administrative Post in the Liquiçá Municipality. The combined area of all sucos within the urban region is 17,862 hectares (44,140 acres), however this includes terrain considered too steep for habitation, with only perhaps 37%, or 6,698 hectares (16,550 acres), flat enough for development. As of 2014, only 25.5% of the total area was developed.

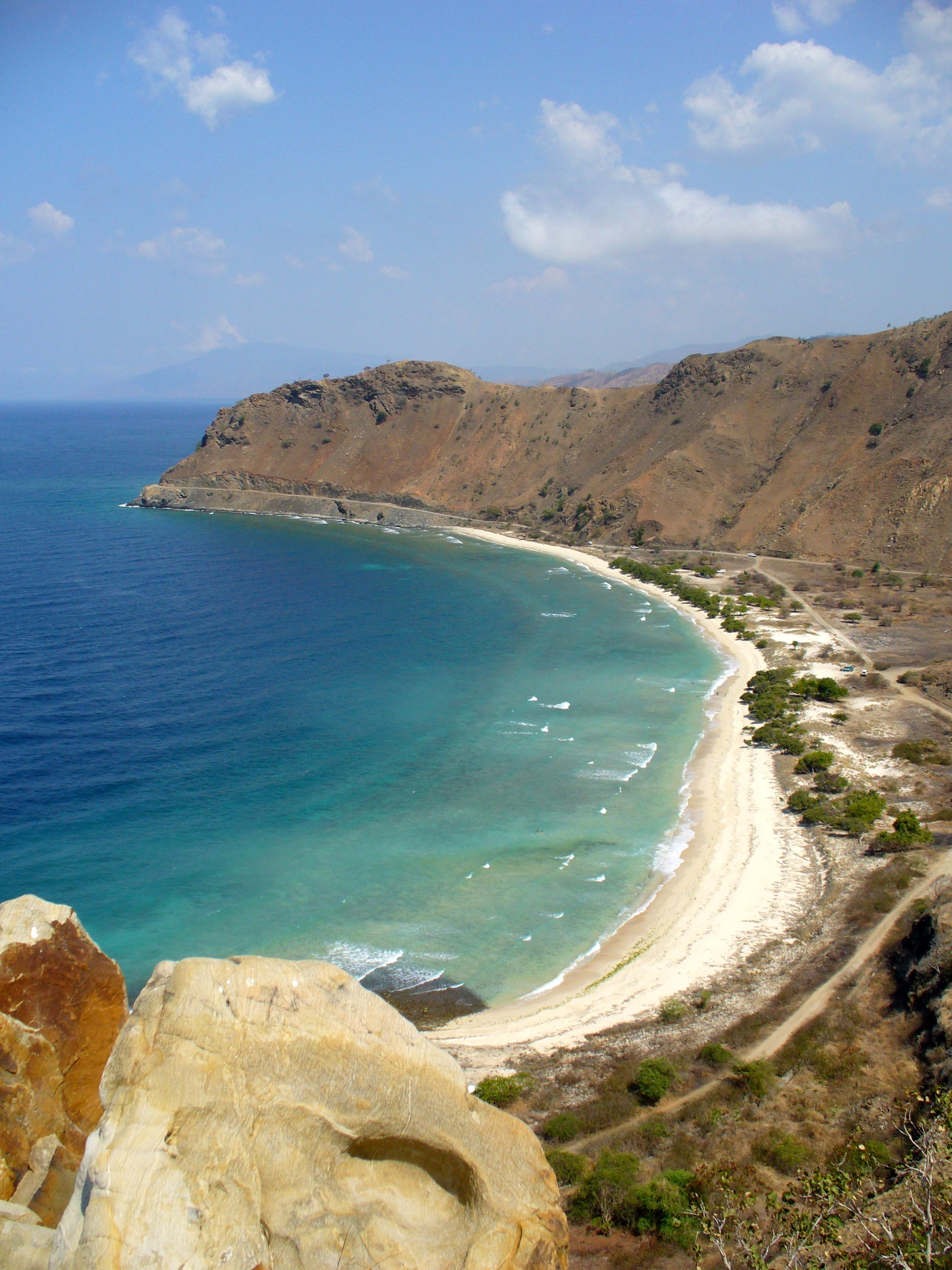
Jesus Backside Beach, east of Dili

The main city lies within an area of flat lowlands of less than 100m altitude, mostly between 0 and 60m, and a slope under 15 degrees. This includes an alluvial plain, and a number of beaches line the coast. The soil underneath this plain is quaternary alluvium. The distance between the sea and the mountains reaches a maximum width of only 4 kilometres (2.5 mi), and the surrounding mountains slope near the city at angles of 20 degrees or higher. On either side of the core urban area are mountain ridges extending from the southern range to the coast, leading to urban development spilling over onto areas of flat land on the other sides of these spurs. Tibar lies on the opposite site of the western range, while Hera lies on the opposite side of the eastern range. Another spur encloses Hera on its east.

The Comoro River flows through the western side of the city, while the Bemorl and Benmauc Rivers join together in the East. The Maloa river lies between these. The Maucau river flows through Tibar, while the Akanunu and Mota Kiik rivers flow through Hera. The Comoro is the largest, with a drainage basin extending 9 kilometres (5.6 mi) inland to a point where the mountains are 900 metres (3,000 ft) high. The water level within these rivers differs greatly between the dry and wet seasons. Parts of the city are considered to face drought hazards and flooding risk from rivers, issues related to climate change. Within the main city of Dili (although not in Hera or Tibar), rivers have reinforced to contain a once-in-25-year flood. Small-scale flooding occurs in a minority of houses a few times each year, and reports of land subsidence are found throughout the city. The Maloa river is the most commonly flooded. Landslides have previously caused damage and loss of life. The area is thought to face earthquake and tsunami risks, although no major events have occurred. Air pollution is considered an increasing issue, with contributors including forest fires, wood-fuelled cooking, and vehicles.

=== Ecology ===
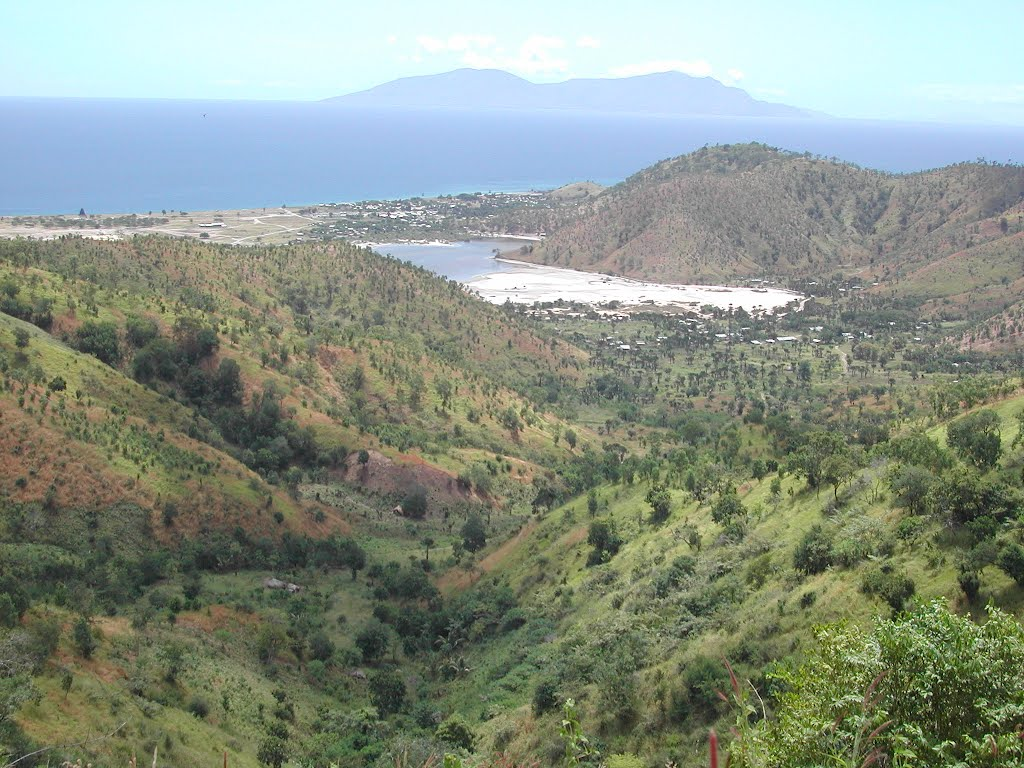
The protected Tasitolu wetlands lie between the mountains and the ocean in Dili's west

The landscape around Dili naturally supports dry deciduous forests. Common tree species include Sterculia foetida, Calophyllum teysmanii, and Aleurites moluccana. Eucalyptus alba is found in rocky areas, and palm and acacia trees are also found. The eucalyptus trees often serve as firewood, while nuts from A. moluccana are sometimes burnt to produce lighting. Trees found within urban areas include Alstonia scholaris, Albizia julibrissin, Ficus microcarpa, and a variety of fruit trees. While forests around the city have been damaged by harvesting for construction and firewood, the national government aims to reforest these areas. Large wildlife in these forests includes monkeys.

Mangrove species found along the coastline include the near-threatened Ceriops decandra. Coral reefs, seagrass meadows, and intertidal mudflats are also present. The coral reefs off Dili appear to be locally sheltered from the average sea surface temperature rise from climate change. However, they face some degradation from human activities. The seagrass beds support dugongs and sea turtles, while dolphins and whales are found offshore.

There are three protected biodiversity areas within Dili: Behau, Cristo Rei Protected Area, and Tasitolu. The 18.1 kilometres (11.2 mi) Cristo Rei Protected Area lies on the mountains separating central Dili and Hera. The 3.8 kilometres (2.4 mi) Tasitolu area lies near the border of the Dili and Liquiçá municipalities and covers land and some coastal waters. It is being developed as a recreational site and holy area. The large 274.9 kilometres (170.8 mi) Behau protected area covers much of the sea off eastern Dili, as well as coastal areas in Hera and to the east. Behau is the most recently proposed of the three areas, and the government is considering abolishing it and replacing it with smaller areas. BirdLife International has identified Cristo Rei Protected Area and Tasitolu as falling within Important Bird Areas. Development can occur in these areas with the approval of the national government. Near-threatened bird species found in these protected areas include the black cuckoo-dove, the pink-headed imperial pigeon, and the Timor sparrow.

=== Climate ===
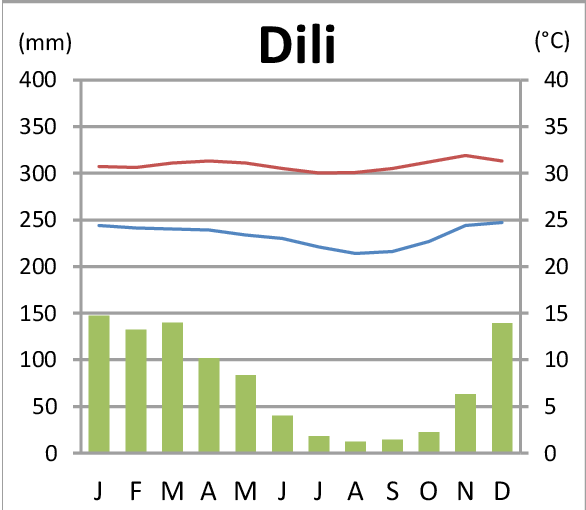
Maximum daily temperatures (red line), minimum daily temperatures (blue line), and precipitation (green bars) changes

Dili has a rather dry tropical savanna climate (Köppen Aw). A rainy season lasts from November to April and a dry season from May to October. Rainfall is highest in December, averaging 170 millimetres or 6.69 inches between 2005 and 2013, and lowest in August, averaging 5.3 millimetres or 0.21 inches over the same time period. The overall average is 902 millimetres or 35.51 inches annually, although there is significant variation between years.

Mean temperatures average around 26 to 28 °C (78.8 to 82.4 °F). This changes by 10.8 to 13.8 °C (19.4 to 24.8 °F) throughout the day, from minimums at around 20 °C or 68 °F to maximums at over 33 °C or 91.4 °F. There are larger temperature changes during the dry season. Climate change is shifting weather patterns, and may exacerbate extreme weather events. The highest single recorded temperature in the city up to 2013 was 36 °C or 96.8 °F in November 2011, while the lowest has been 14 °C or 57.2 °F in August 2013.

Climate data for Dili (Presidente Nicolau Lobato International Airport) 1991–2020 normals, extremes 1950–present
Month	Jan	Feb	Mar	Apr	May	Jun	Jul	Aug	Sep	Oct	Nov	Dec	Year
Record high °C (°F)	36.0 (96.8)	35.5 (95.9)	36.6 (97.9)	36.0 (96.8)	35.7 (96.3)	36.5 (97.7)	34.1 (93.4)	35.0 (95.0)	34.0 (93.2)	34.5 (94.1)	36.0 (96.8)	35.5 (95.9)	36.6 (97.9)
Mean daily maximum °C (°F)	31.3 (88.3)	31.1 (88.0)	31.2 (88.2)	31.8 (89.2)	31.8 (89.2)	31.1 (88.0)	30.7 (87.3)	31.0 (87.8)	31.7 (89.1)	32.3 (90.1)	32.7 (90.9)	32.0 (89.6)	31.6 (88.9)
Daily mean °C (°F)	27.7 (81.9)	27.5 (81.5)	27.4 (81.3)	27.7 (81.9)	27.6 (81.7)	26.8 (80.2)	26.2 (79.2)	26.1 (79.0)	26.7 (80.1)	27.6 (81.7)	28.3 (82.9)	28.1 (82.6)	27.3 (81.1)
Mean daily minimum °C (°F)	24.1 (75.4)	23.9 (75.0)	23.6 (74.5)	23.5 (74.3)	23.3 (73.9)	22.4 (72.3)	21.6 (70.9)	21.1 (70.0)	21.6 (70.9)	22.8 (73.0)	23.9 (75.0)	24.2 (75.6)	23.0 (73.4)
Record low °C (°F)	19.0 (66.2)	16.2 (61.2)	16.5 (61.7)	18.2 (64.8)	13.2 (55.8)	14.5 (58.1)	12.4 (54.3)	11.8 (53.2)	13.4 (56.1)	16.1 (61.0)	18.0 (64.4)	16.7 (62.1)	11.8 (53.2)
Average rainfall mm (inches)	175.2 (6.90)	143.1 (5.63)	114.4 (4.50)	64.1 (2.52)	29.5 (1.16)	18.4 (0.72)	11.2 (0.44)	6.5 (0.26)	5.2 (0.20)	15.5 (0.61)	53.4 (2.10)	142.1 (5.59)	778.6 (30.63)
Average rainy days (≥ 1.0 mm)	14.2	12.4	11.2	6.5	3.6	2.4	1.8	1.1	0.9	2.1	5.4	12.8	74.4
Average relative humidity (%)	80	81.5	80.5	77	75	73	71	69.5	67	68.5	71.5	77	74.3
Mean monthly sunshine hours	189.1	161.0	201.5	234.0	266.6	246.0	260.4	275.9	276.0	272.8	249.0	195.3	2,827.6
Mean daily sunshine hours	6.1	5.7	7.6	7.8	8.6	8.2	8.8	9.4	9.6	9.6	9.0	7.1	8.1
Source 1: Indonesian Agency for Meteorology, Climatological and Geophysics (BMKG) / Timor-Leste Directorate General of Meteorology and Geophysics
Source 2: Climate Data

=== Buildings and monuments ===
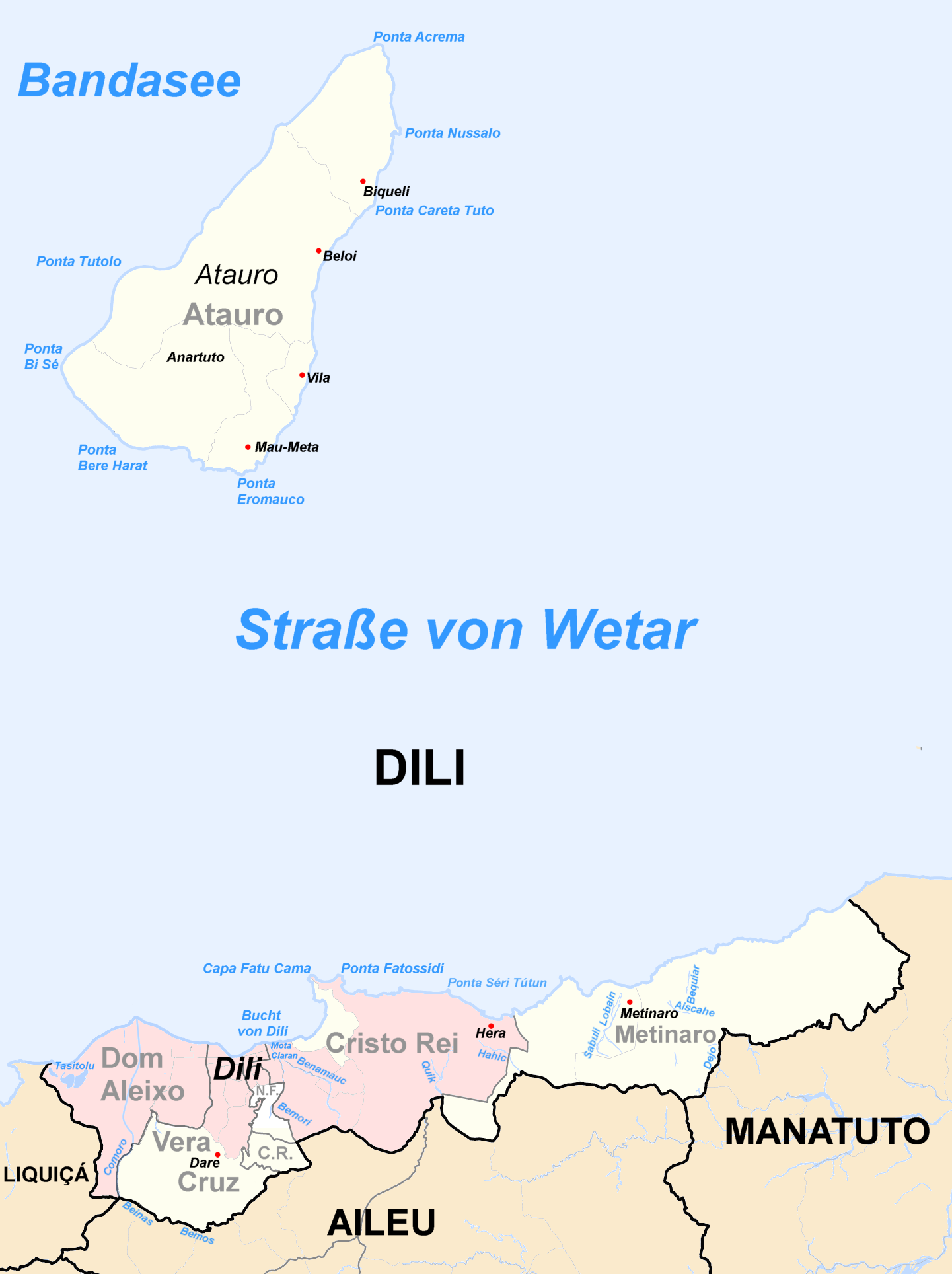
Dili Municipality (prior to the separation of Atauro), with sucos considered urban in red

The old quarter of the city lies within what is now the city's eastern half. The original Portuguese settlement occurred in a grid parallel to the shore, and the city has extended along this east-west axis. The older parts of the city are the most densely built up, with little available land. The western portion of the city is the location of the airport and has the most recent urban growth. Most infrastructure was destroyed in 1999, including 68,000 homes. Following rebuilding as of 2010, 71.6% of houses have concrete or brick walls. In Hera however, just over 50% of houses were mostly wooden as of 2014.

Land rights remain complicated and unresolved as a result of the 2006 crisis, with returns of former residents to the capital having been carried out on an ad-hoc basis. There are disputes between residents who claim land was taken from them by previous regimes, and the national government that has created what is seen as an expansive definition of state land. Developing a formal property system and land register is a key development goal. Those living in houses with this mixed ownership history, perhaps up to 50% of all residents, face heightened risk of eviction.

Important government buildings which form the core of the city are clustered around the Port of Dili. The outskirts of the city are the most recently developed, and grew organically without much urban planning. The central core (Bairro Central) contains most administrative buildings, and has the most buildings constructed with masonry. It retains many buildings that reflect Portuguese-era architecture. To the east of the central government area is the old Chinese area, which still retains a number of Chinese-influenced buildings.

Portuguese-era buildings are most common in the Motael, Gricenfor, and Bidau Lecidere sucos, often stretched along the main road running through the old part of the city, the Avenida Nicolau Lobato. The main government complex is located at the Largo Infante Dom Henrique, next to the seafront. This location was part of the 1951 urban plan. The primary building here is the Government Palace, consists of three two-story buildings connected by a single arcade which were built at different periods between 1953 and 1969. Another old building is the former Market Hall.

The government has identified a number of heritage buildings in the city, especially in the old quarter. New buildings are being built to house cultural institutions. The Museum and Cultural Centre of Timor-Leste is tasked with hosting the country's cultural artefacts. The National Library of Timor-Leste is intended to serve as both a library and a national archive.

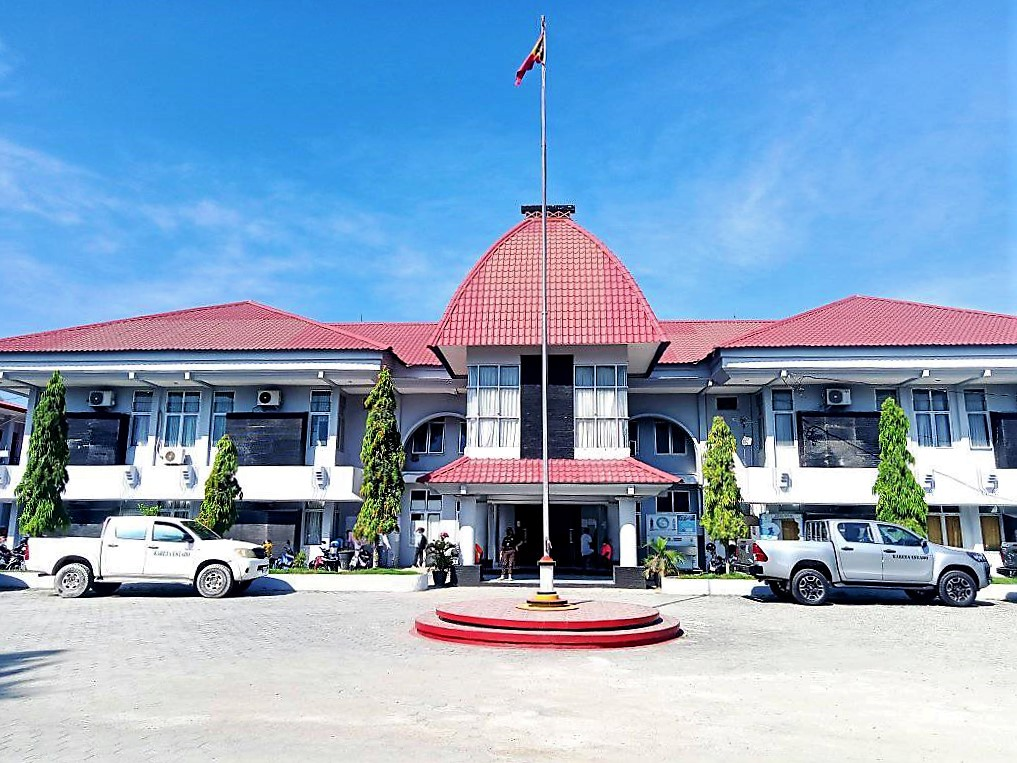
Dili City Hall

Notable churches include the Motael Church, the oldest in the country, which became associated with resistance to Indonesian rule. The Immaculate Conception Cathedral was built with the intention of being the largest church in Southeast Asia. The Cristo Rei of Dili is a 27-metre (89 ft) tall statue of Jesus situated on top of a globe at the end of the eastern Fatucama peninsula. It is positioned at the end of a Stations of the Cross pathway including over 500 steps. It was a present from the government of Indonesia during occupation for the 20th anniversary of East Timor's integration into Indonesia. Its height reflects the symbolism of East Timor being Indonesia's 27th province at the time of the monument's construction in 1996.

The Integration Monument commemorates the Indonesian annexation of the territory in 1976. It takes the shape of a statue of an East Timorese warrior in traditional dress breaking the chains round his wrists, deliberate chosen to associate traditional Timorese identity with Indonesian rule. The monument has not been demolished, but is instead now regarded as representing the struggle against both periods of foreign rule.

The National Stadium has two seating stands, one on either side, with grass banks providing space for other spectators. It has a capacity of around 9,000 people. It is often used to host association football, the most popular sport in the country, although infrastructure issues mean the national team must sometimes play home games in other countries. In the past it has been used to host refugees and distribute aid.

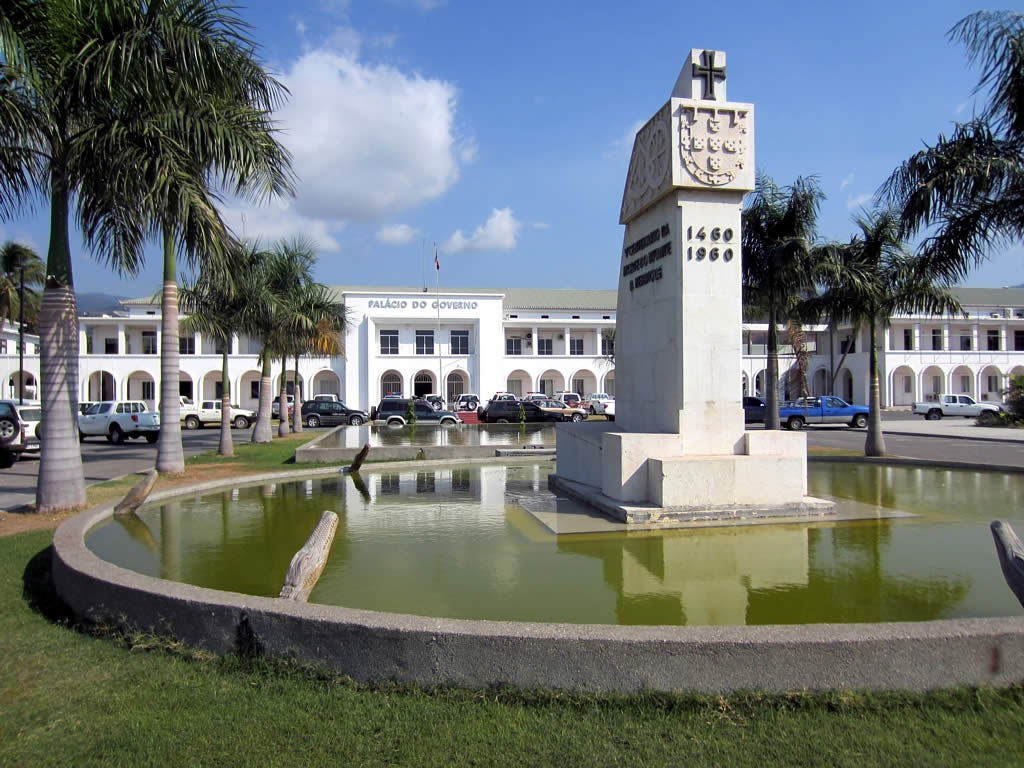
Government Palace, Dili (Timor-Leste's prime minister's Office)

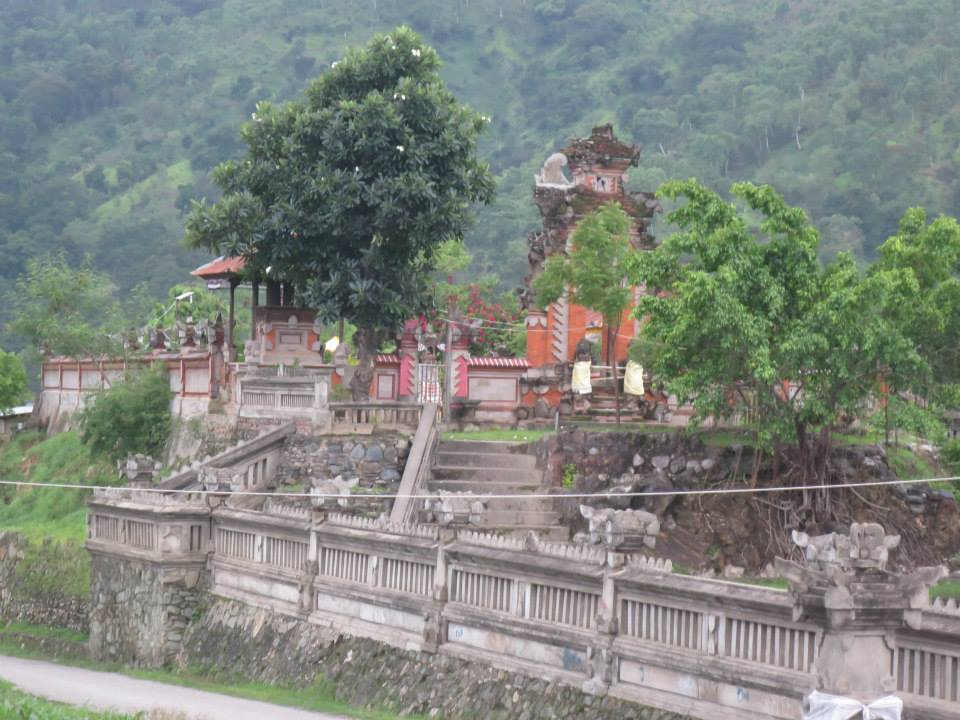
Pura Girinatha Hindu temple, built during Indonesian occupation

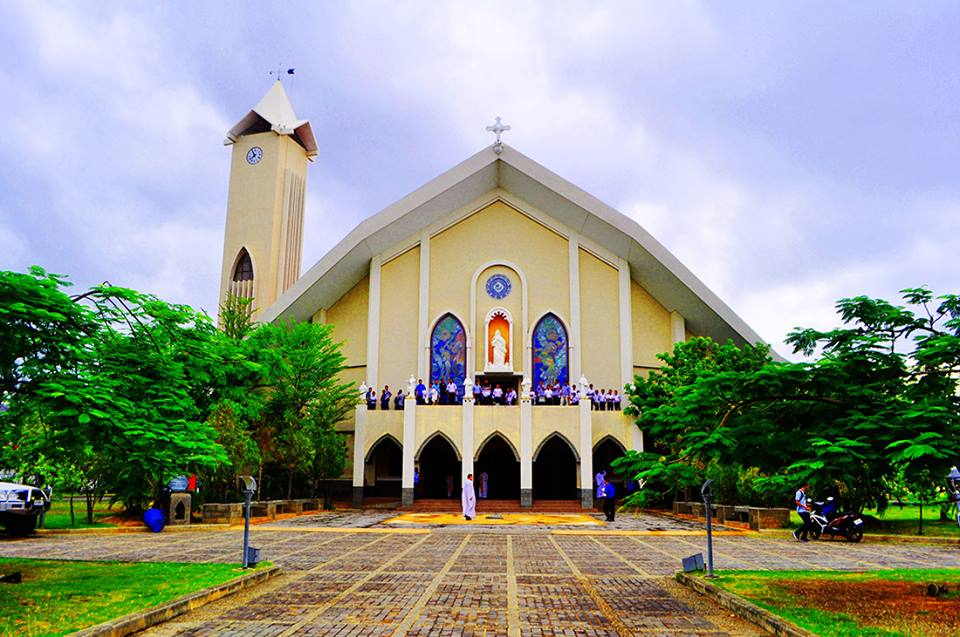
Dili Cathedral

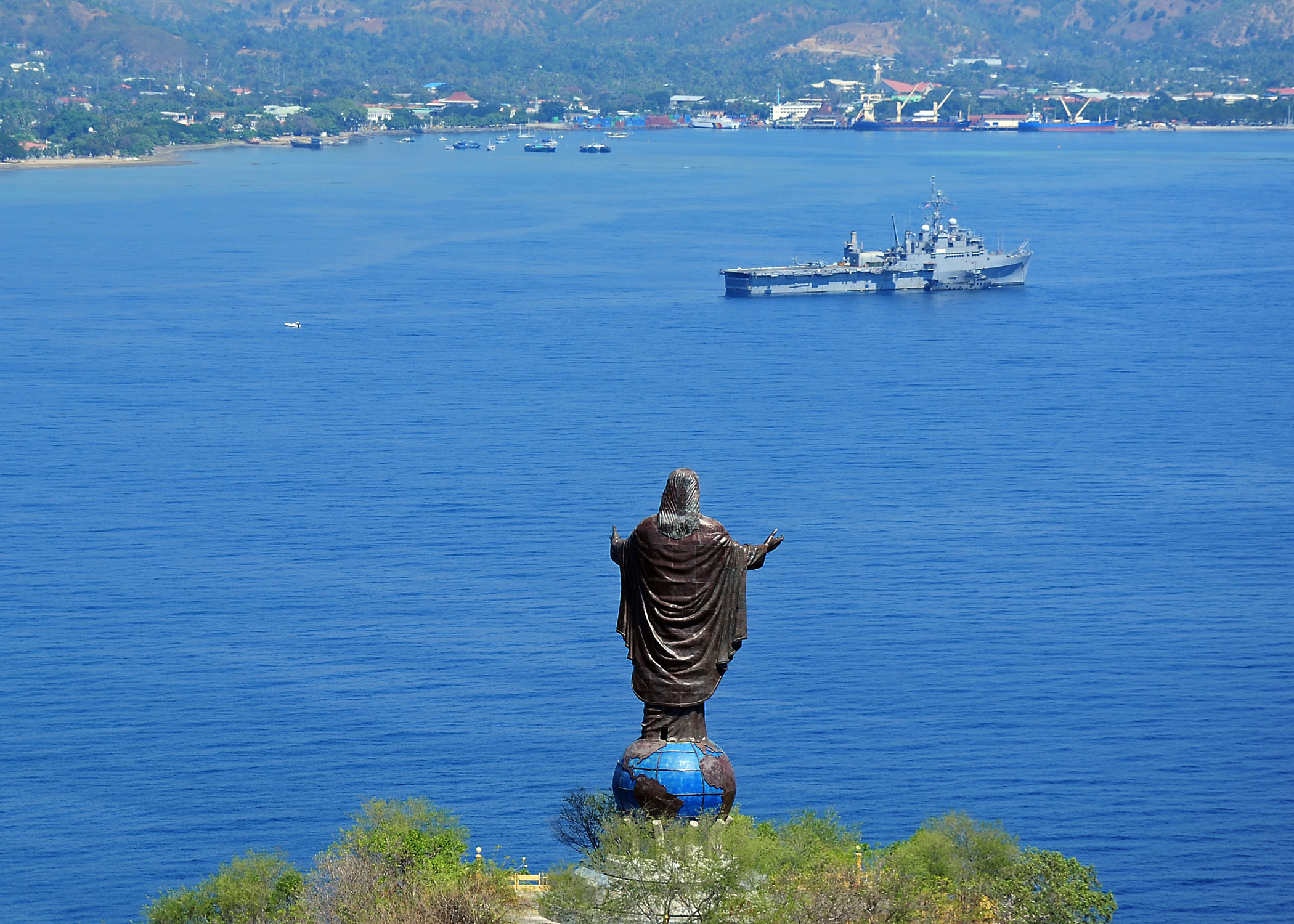
Cristo Rei of Dili atop a summit on Fatucama peninsula outside of Dili

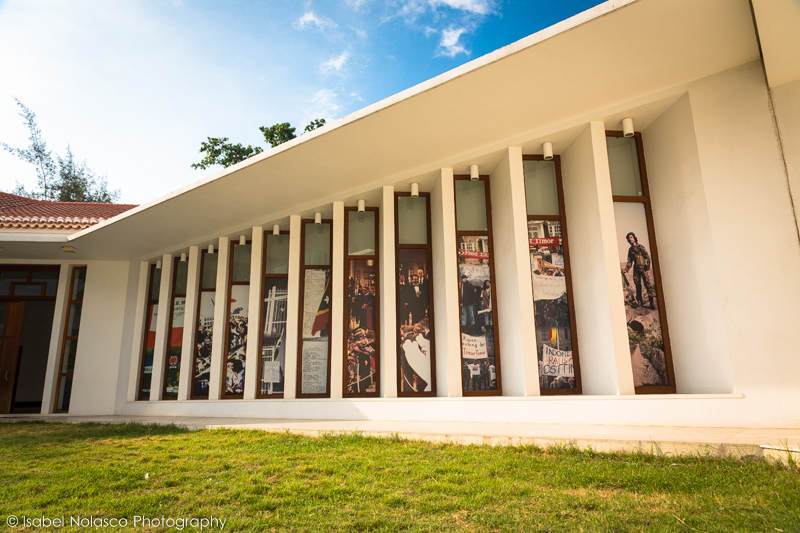
Timorese Resistance Archive and Museum

== Administration ==
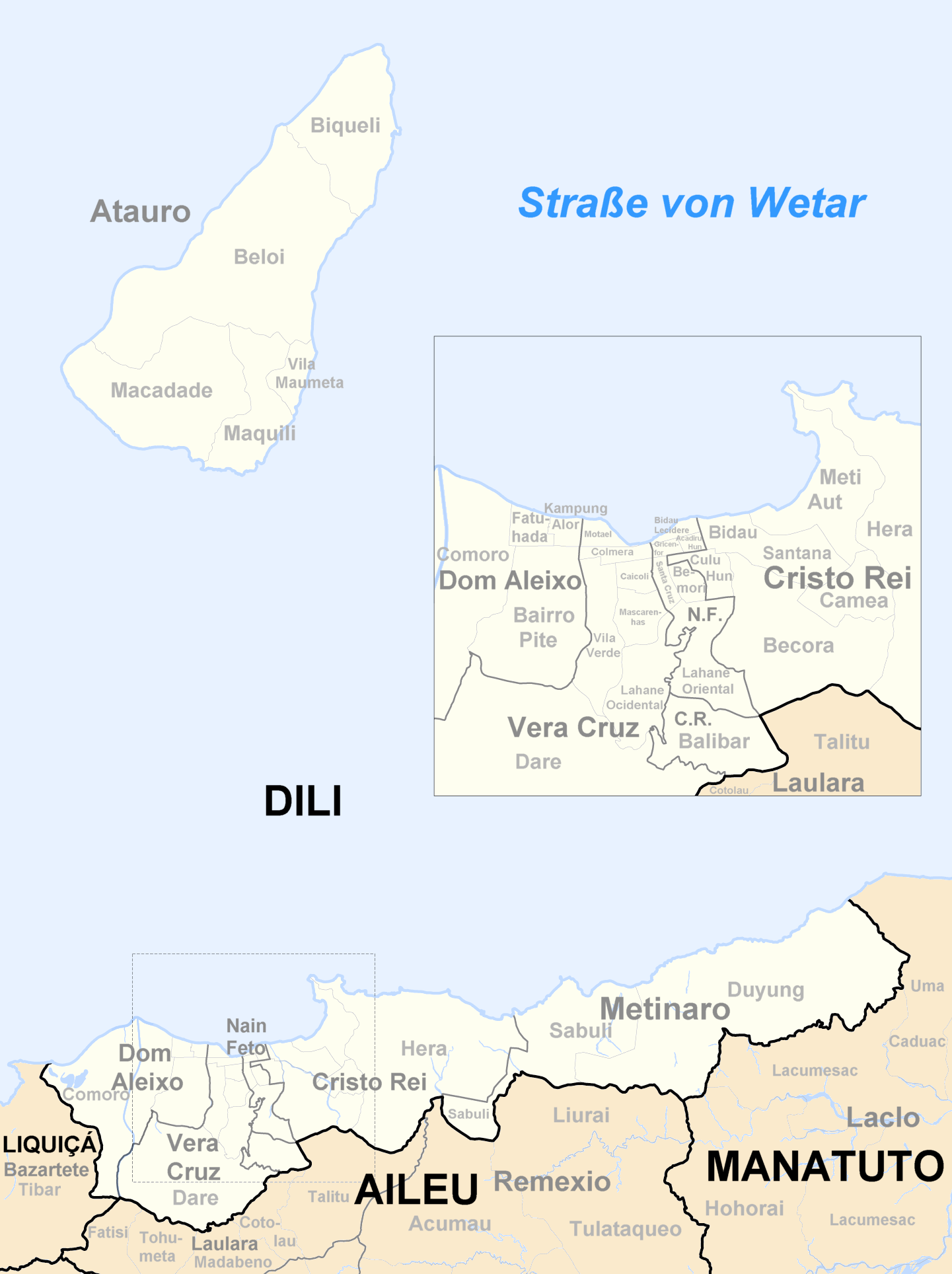
Administration of district Dili (prior to the separation of Atauro)

Dili is the administrative centre of the Dili Municipality, serving as both the municipal and national capital. Dili itself does not have a city government, but is governed centrally by the Dili Municipality, along with the Hera and Metinaro areas. The current president of the Dili Municipality Authority is Gregório da Cunha Saldanha, sworn in on 1 March 2024. The municipality has an elected mayor and council.

Timor-Leste's municipalities are divided into administrative posts, and each of these is divided into sucos. The central city of Dili is spread over four of the six administrative posts within Dili municipality: Cristo Rei, Dom Aleixo, Nain Feto, and Vera Cruz. The Hera suco is the easternmost suco of Cristo Rei. Tibar, to the west of the main city, is the easternmost suco of the Bazartete Administrative Post in the Liquiçá Municipality.

Each suco has a chefe. Those in Dili have less influence over community land than those elsewhere, however their elected status gives them greater authority in other areas. Each also has a head office. Municipal and national government buildings are concentrated in the city centre, mainly in the sucos of Caicori, Colmera, and Gricenfor. Sucos, administrative posts, and municipalities are all tasked with setting up a Disaster Management Committee. These are responsible for planning, public awareness, and disaster response. The borders of sucos, and the aldeias within them, are often undefined. Reasons for this include the history of displacement, and taboo over formal demarcation.

Land registration is difficult due to the city's tumultuous history, and legal ownership is often unclear. It is thought that in 1999 existing land records were taken from Dili to Indonesia. The new government attempted to set up a system of rent, charging a small fee of $10 a month for those occupying state property. However, in many cases even this could not be paid. In 2003 the national government legislated that all previous state property, as well as abandoned properties, belonged to the state. It also set up a system of registration based on occupation. Residents can claim land they live in, if there are no objections from others. The 2006 crisis put an end to attempts to enforce rent. Evictions from state property are rare. A cadastral survey began in 2008. As of 2014, 70% of the land in Dili had been surveyed, although this information is not public. Despite this lack of information, most in the city claim ownership of their homes, with 90% of homes considered owned by an individual or by a family. Land valuation is often unclear.

The sucos within the four administrative posts in the western Dili Municipality that form the core city are as follows:

Cristo Rei

- Balibar
- Becora
- Bidau Santana
- Camea
- Culuhun
- Hera
- Metiaut

Dom Aleixo

- Bairro Pite
- Comoro
- Fatuhada
- Kampung Alor

Nain Feto

- Acadiruhun
- Bemori
- Bidau Lecidere
- Gricenfor
- Lahane Oriental
- Santa Cruz

Vera Cruz

- Caicoli
- Colmera
- Dare
- Lahane Ocidental
- Mascarenhas
- Motael
- Vila Verde

== Economy ==
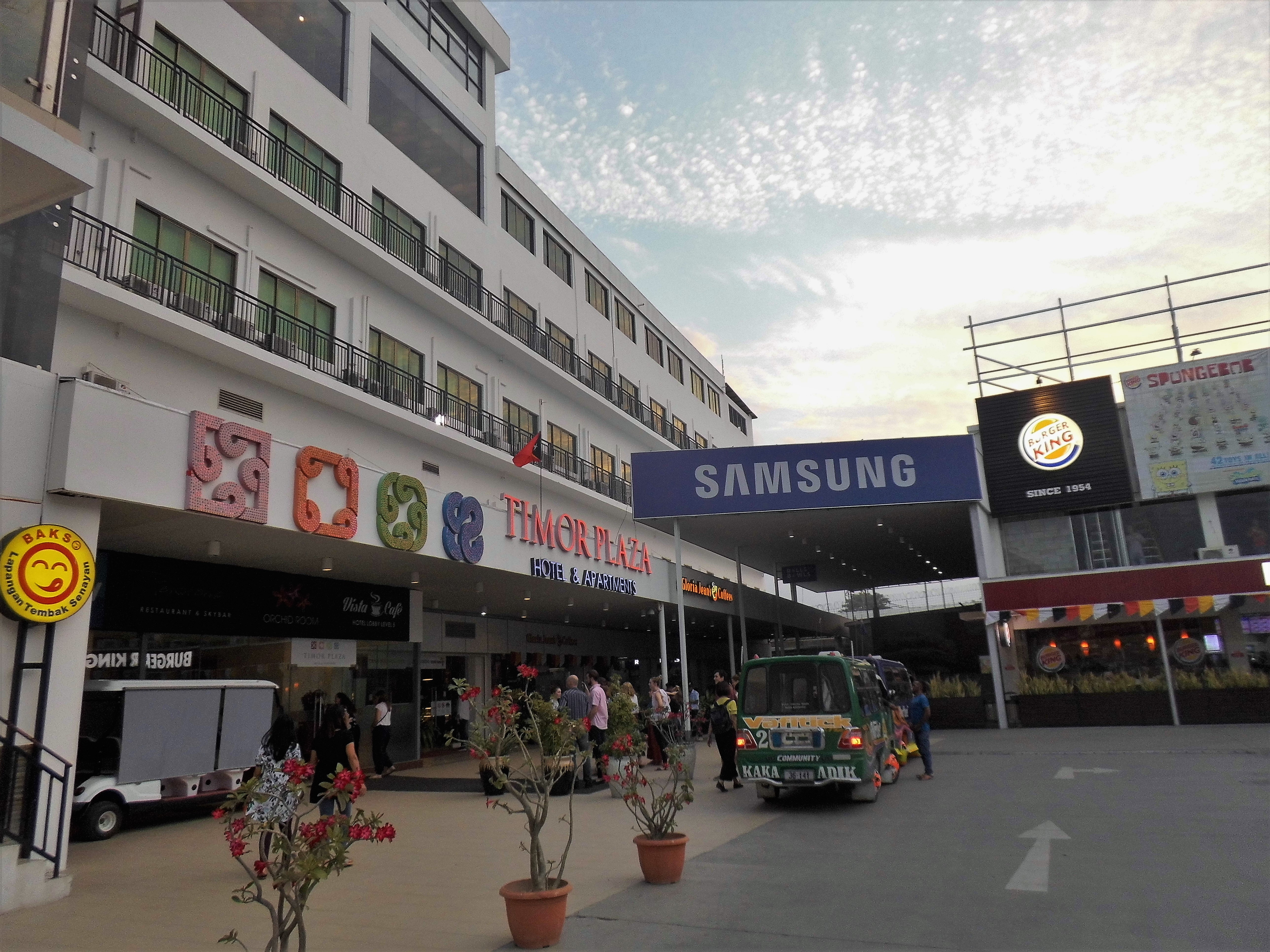
Timor Plaza, the country's first shopping centre

The economic situation in Dili is substantially better than that of the rest of the country, and most wealth is concentrated there. Almost all of the sucos of Dili are among those with the country's highest living standards and the greatest access to public services. The Dili district as a whole has a higher significantly higher living standard than any other part of the country, and while poverty rates within the sucos of the municipality as a whole range from 8 to 80%, every suco within the city proper was ranked within the highest level of living standards. 57.8% of those in the capital are among those with relatively high levels of wealth, as opposed to 8.7% in rural areas.

In 2004 18,331 people were working in the agricultural sector, 1,885 in resources and manufacturing, 5,027 in hospitality, 3,183 in finance, real estate, and logistics, 6,520 in government services and security, 879 in home industries, 6,354 for international diplomatic bodies, and 2,142 unknown. By 2010, the tertiary sector employed 44% of those working, with government employment providing around 25% of jobs. The primary sector is slightly smaller than the government in terms of employment, while the secondary sector remains small. The working age population grew by almost 50% from 2004 to 2010, while unemployment declined from 26.9% to 17.4%. Nonetheless, youth unemployment in the municipality stood at 58% in 2007, above the national average of 43%. The capital attracts younger and educated individuals from the rest of the country.

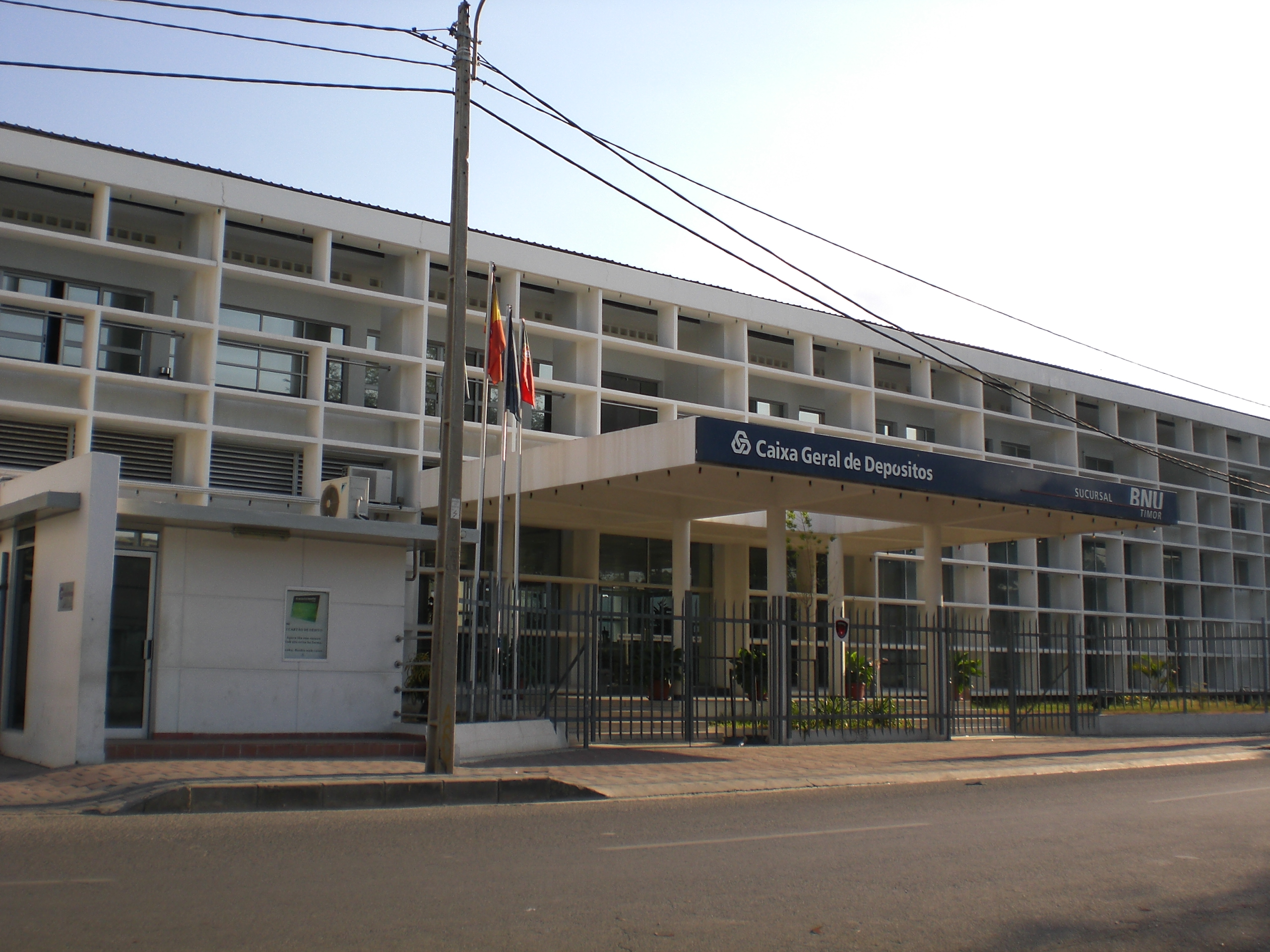
Banco Nacional Ultramarino building, Dili

The city lies within the government's "Northern Regional Development Corridor", which stretches along the coast from the Indonesia border to Baucau. Within this, it is part of the smaller "Dili-Tibar-Hera" area in which the government plans to develop the service sector. The city is also part of what is designated the central tourism zone. Sites related to important historical events are promoted, as well as eco-tourism. Whale watching is possible off the coast, and there are many scuba diving sites near the city. Some tourism and industrial complexes are being developed within the metropolitan area. There is a large informal economy that includes some of the officially unemployed residents.

Tourism numbers increased from 14,000 to 51,000 from 2006 to 2013. Half of visitors arriving at Dili's airport come from three countries: Australia, Indonesia, and Portugal. Near the beginning of UN rule, there were at least 9 hotels with 550 rooms. As of 2012, there were at least 14 hotels in the city. Most hotels are run by local companies, with few international chains present. Nightly rates are relatively high for the region, partially due to a lack of sufficient tourists to benefit from economies of scale. Important hotels include Hotel Timor and Hotel Dili.

Most large investments come from the public sector, although there is a growing small-scale private sector. The Dili municipality is responsible for around 40% of the country's fish production, most of which is consumed domestically. The country's three significant commercial banks operate primarily in Dili.

The Port of Dili is the country's largest. It handles the majority of international shipping. There are regular ships to Darwin (Australia), Kota Kinabalu (Malaysia), Surabaya (Indonesia), and Singapore, and less frequent shipping to and from other Indonesian ports. As of 2011, the port processed 200,000 tonnes of goods annually, which had increased by 20% each year for the previous six years. 80% of the goods processed are imports.

== Demographics ==
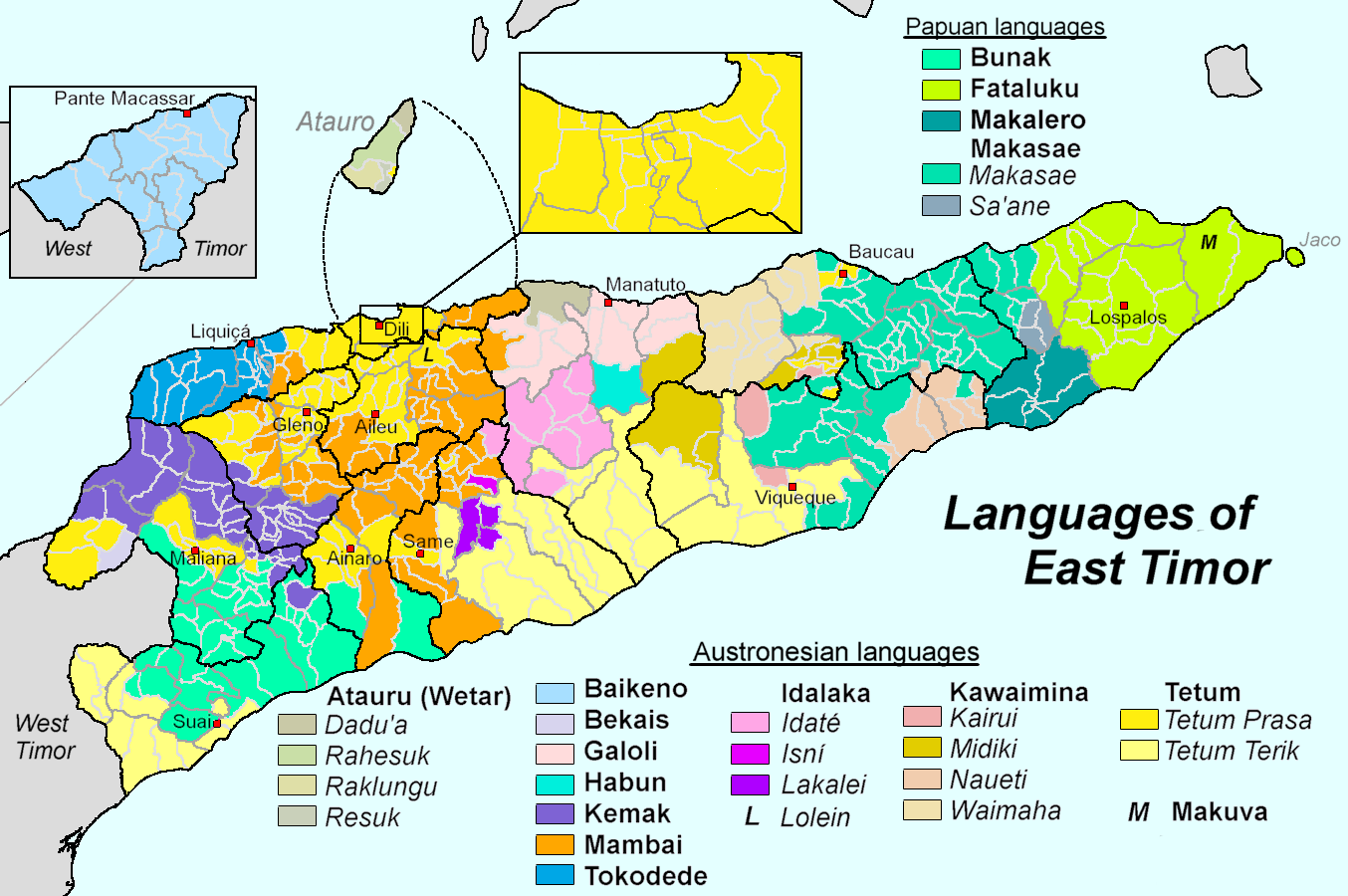
Dili lies within a predominantly Tetum-speaking area.

The 2022 census found the population of the municipality was 324,269, of which 82.4% were urban. The municipality had the largest overall population and the highest growth rate since 2015, although average household size decreased from 6.4 to 5.7. The city contains almost twice as many dwellings as all other urban areas in the country combined. The municipality is the most densely populated in the country at 1,425 people per square kilometre, eight times denser than the second most densely populated municipality. and Dom Aleixo with 166 thousand people remained the country's most populous administrative post. By 2030, the population of the municipality is predicted to reach around 580,000.

The gender ratio in 2022 was around 103 men for every 100 women, in line with the national average. The dependency ratio of 51 dependents for every 100 economically active individuals is much lower than elsewhere in the country, likely due to the in-migration of younger adults. Every other municipality in the country shows a net negative in-migration rate, leading Dili to gain 36.9% of its population through this in-migration. The literacy rate for those 10 and over was 89.6%. Only 5.4% of dwellings had piped water, a toilet, a bath or shower, and a kitchen.

Due to limited space, a small number of people settled in hilly and mountainous areas starting around 1990, especially in southern areas near the national highway. However, due to properties being abandoned following the independence vote, much settlement in the 21st century has been into these vacated areas. Population density tends to be higher in areas of unplanned settlement than in planned neighbourhoods.

The primary local language is Tetum, which was promoted during Portuguese rule and has become an official language of the country. Speakers from the other languages of Timor-Leste are present in the city, where the official language of Portuguese and the working languages of English and Indonesian are also spoken. A dialect of Malay-based creole called Dili Malay is spoken by perhaps 1,000 residents with ancestral links to Alor Island. Migration into the city has led to clustering of incoming migrants into areas with others of similar backgrounds.

== Education ==
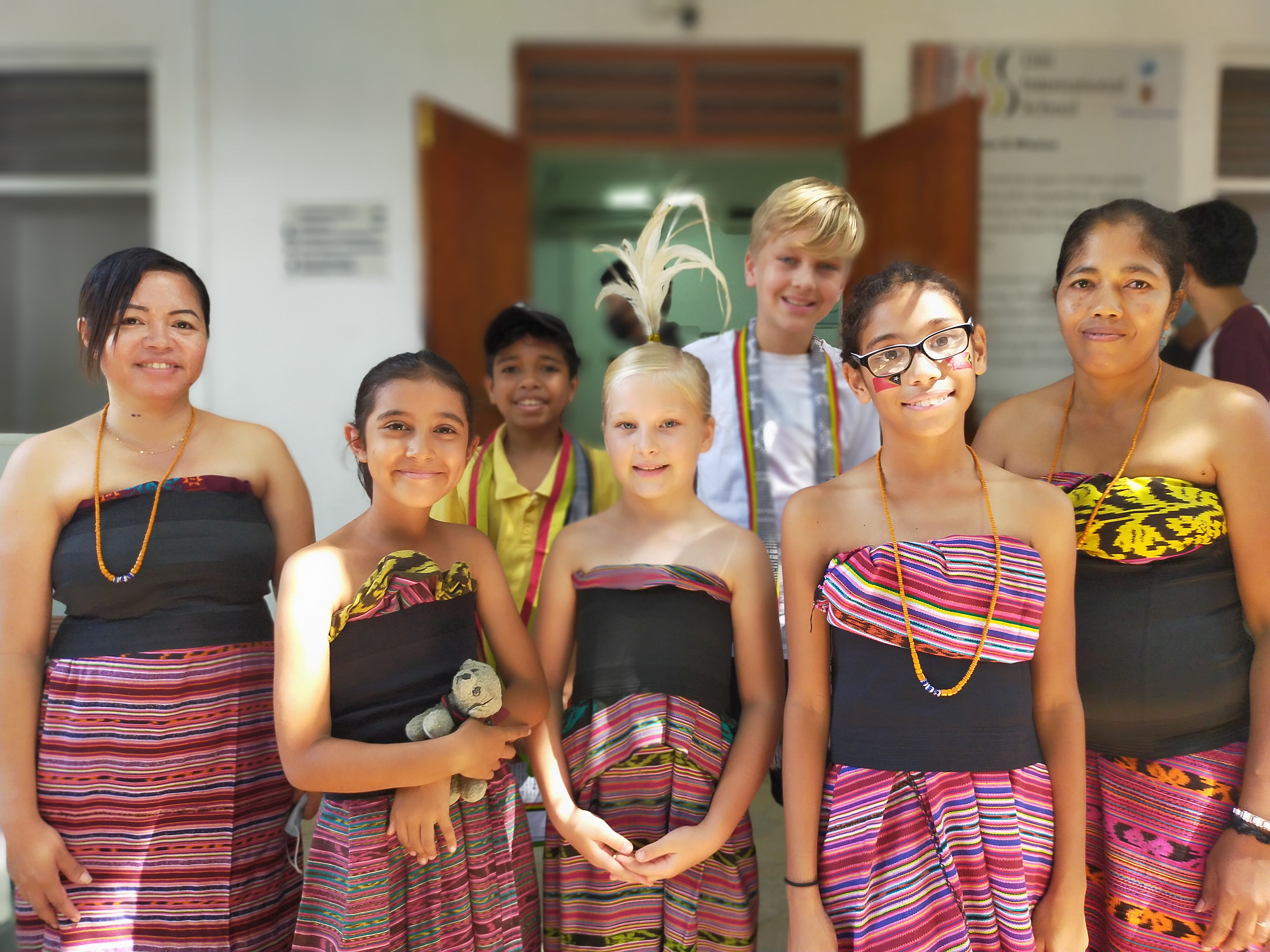
Students at the Dili International School

Education is more common in Dili Municipality than elsewhere in the country. The attendance rate at primary schools increased from 37% in 2004 to 73% in 2010. As of 2010, 86% of those five or older in the municipality had attended primary school, equivalent to the literacy rate. Within the metropolitan area, education rates are highest in Nain Feto and Vera Cruz, where 88% are either attending or have attended primary school. These are followed by Dom Alexio at 87%, and Cristo Rei at 81%. Tibar, lying outside of Dili Municipality, has the lowest at 75%.

As of 2013, there were 108 schools in Dili, Hera, and Tibar, including primary, secondary, and specialist schools. Of these, 61 were public and 47 private. This equated to 4.8 schools per 10,000 people. In 2011, 43% of students in the Dili municipality studied in private schools. Many private schools are run by the Catholic Church, for example, Don Bosco Training Center, including 32% of all schools in the Dili Municipality.

Seventy-six per cent of the country's university students study in the municipality. This is responsible for some of the internal migration to the city. The National University of Timor-Leste created a "University City" master plan to develop the Hera area.

== Infrastructure ==
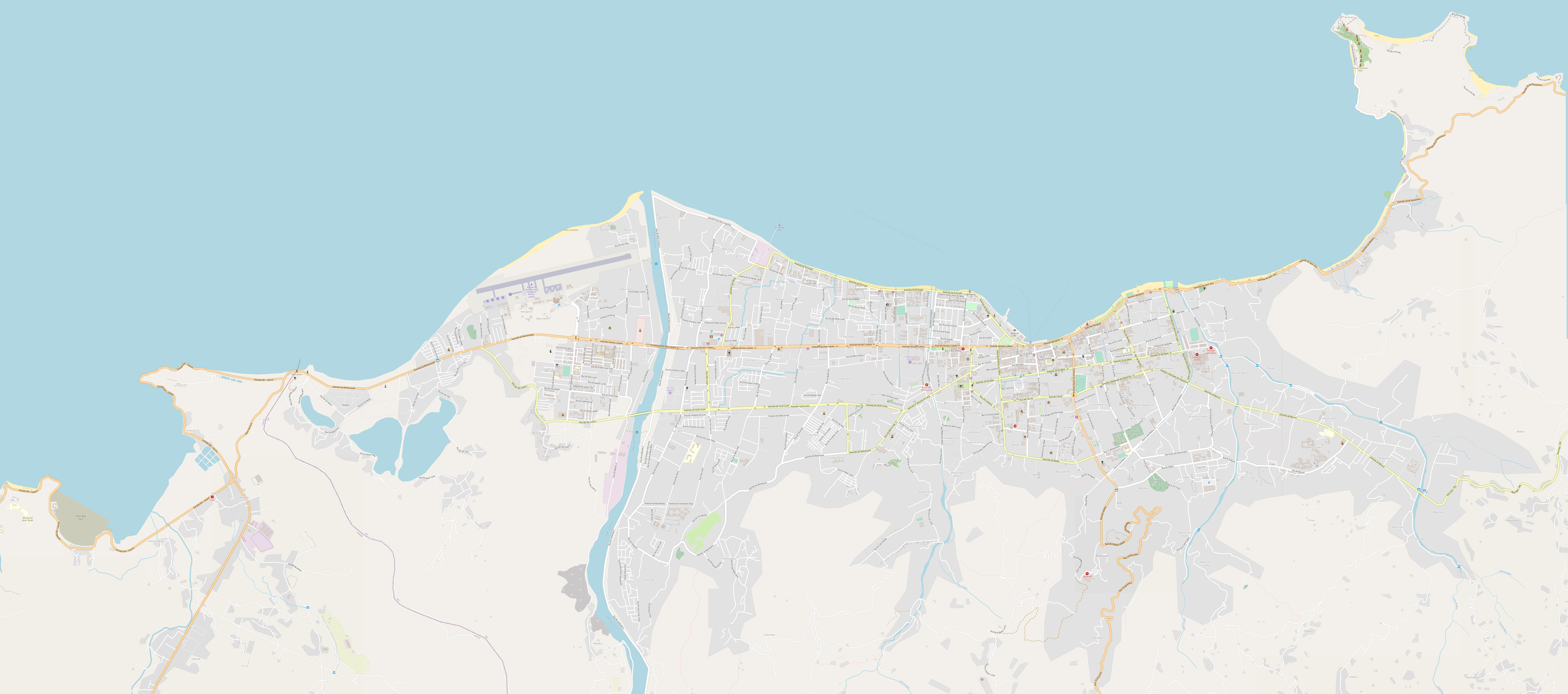
The urban area of Dili proper in 2020, with Tibar to the west. The large Comoro River is crossed by just two vehicle bridges.

Up to 70% of the country's infrastructure was destroyed in 1999, including almost the entire electrical grid, and much of the water infrastructure. Dili's airport and port were rehabilitated in the six years following this, along with electricity and telecommunications. The rapid population growth of the city has put a strain on some of its infrastructure services. Pre-independence laws prohibiting building within 100 metres (330 ft) of water bodies are not enforced, with population growth leading to structures such as housing being built in flood-prone areas, including along dry river beds and canals.

=== Utilities ===
==== Electricity ====
In the early years of UN rule, electricity was provided by the Comoro power station, which has a 16 MW diesel generator. By 2004, there were 23,000 connections in the city creating a demand of 12.5 MW. At the time, Dili was the only location in Timor-Leste with 24-hour electricity. Electricity demand peaked from 19:00 to 22:00. By 2009, Comoro was producing 32 MW, and by the year after that 92.3% of Dili's households used electricity for lighting purposes. Cooking remained carried out using firewood by 66.2% of households, with electricity being used by just 10.1%. Non-payment of electricity bills has caused some funding problems. In 2011, only 40% of commercial recipients of electricity paid their electricity bills.

In November 2011, the diesel generators at the new Hera Power Station became operational, producing 119 MW. This replaced the operations of the Comoro station, with Hera able to produce electricity using 17% less fuel. A new substation was created to supply Dili, and transmission lines link Dili to other cities and towns along the northern coast, part of a ring surrounding the country. As of 2016, Dili's peak power demand reached 42.11 MW. The development of electricity infrastructure since independence has significantly reduced electricity costs, which moved from 249c per kilowatt-hour in 2002 to 5c per kilowatt-hour in 2014.

==== Telecommunications ====
Telecommunications activity in the country is primarily carried out using mobile phones, with most of the country's 3000 landlines found in Dili and used mainly for government and business. There are no submarine communications cables connecting to the country, so internet access is supplied via satellites. This is expensive, and internet usage nationally was only just above 1% in 2016. The government has approved the installation of the Timor-Leste South submarine Cable (TLSSC), connecting to Darwin in Australia, as well as another cable connecting to the Indonesian island of Alor. As of 2020, there were 3 telecommunications companies in the country: Telemor, Telkomcel, and Timor Telecom.

==== Water and sanitation ====
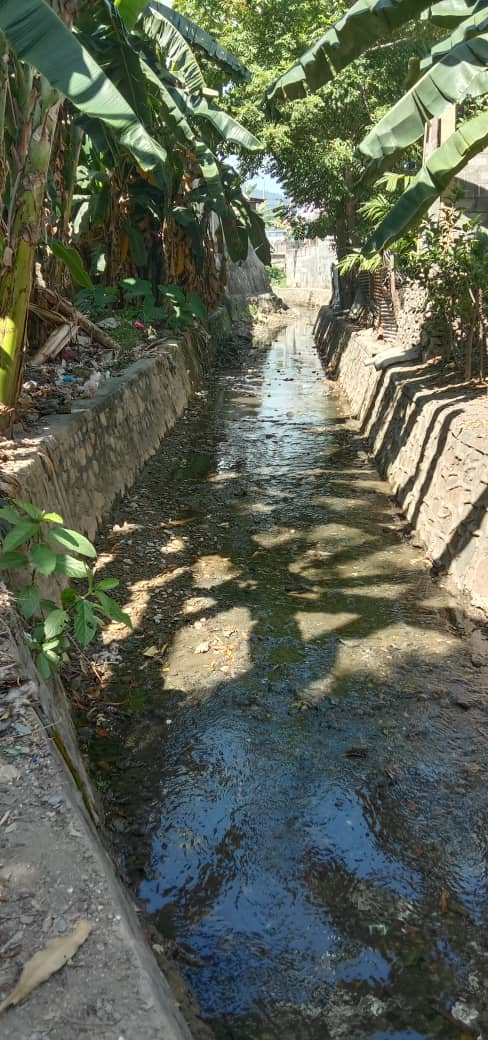
A canal in western Dili

Access to clean water and sanitation is an issue for some households. Over $250 million was invested by the UN and other organisations to build Dili's water infrastructure. Existing water sources and transportation infrastructure are considered sufficient to meet the immediate needs of the city, although work continues to improve quality and reliability. In 2007, 25% of residents received 24 hours of water. As of 2013, while 36% of households were connected to the water supply system, half Dili received less than six hours of water a day. Furthermore, water quality was irregular, with boiling advised. By 2015, it remained the case that less than 30% of those in Dili had access to a continuous water supply. In 2018, water remained available on average from 4 to 8 hours.

Water is managed by the National Directorate of Water and Sanitation Services (Dirasaun Nasional Sistema Agua no Saneamentu/DNSAS), which derives 60% of water supplies from groundwater. This groundwater extraction began in the 1980s, and accelerated after independence. Private entities also pump water from the aquifer without regulation. Despite the inconsistency of supply, 91% of those in urban areas have some access to safe drinking water, with sources including pumps, public taps, and wells and boreholes. Some households have tanks installed to alleviate the impact of service interruptions. Half of the city's water comes from a local aquifer, and there are four water treatment plants at the southern edges of the city. Water tariffs were put in place in 2004, but were removed in 2006 following the 2006 East Timorese crisis. By 2010 27.821 cubic metres (982.5 cu ft) of water was pumped from the aquifer each day, almost as fast as the aquifer could refill. Trials for water tariff re-introduction began in 2013. Increasing usage has led to the aquifer, the Dili Groundwater Basin, being unable to match demand during the dry season. An increasing number of wells has increased demand, while development altering drainage patterns has limited recharge rates. The aquifer is constrained by the ocean on one side and mountains on the others. Downstream areas also face saltwater intrusion.

Dili is the location of the country's water testing laboratory, and thus its water quality is regularly monitored. The lack of manufacturing in the city is thought to have limited potential water pollution. However, pollution risks emerge from the common discharge of untreated household water, and leakage from latrine pits into the soil and relatively high water table. Water stores in households, as well as from some wells, has been found to have bacteriological contamination. As of 2010, only 16% of households emptied their latrine pits. Hera and Tibar lack water treatment plants, with residents relying on boreholes and delivery by water trucks. As of 2010, daily demand was 32,000 m^{3} in Dili proper, 520 m^{3} in Hera, and 220 m^{3} in Tibar.

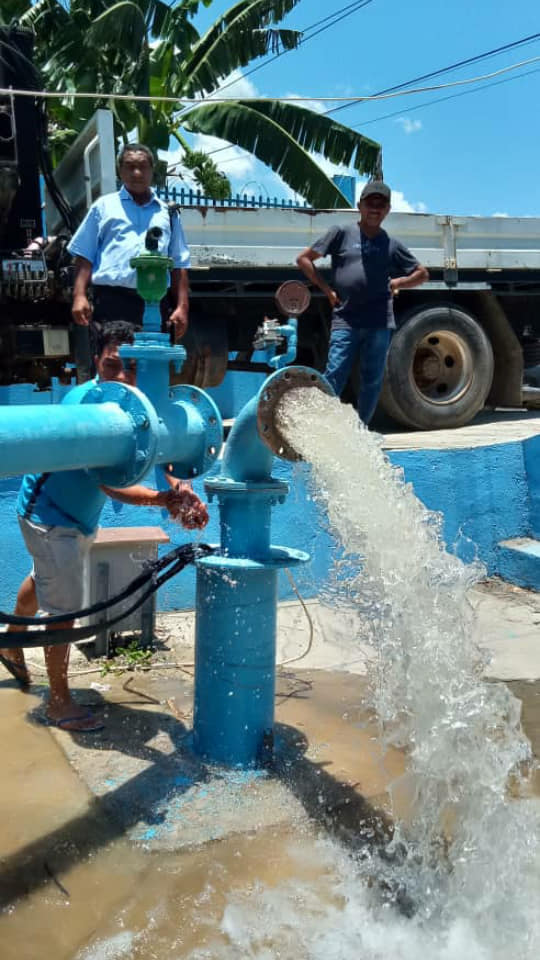
A water pipe in the east of the city

Drainage infrastructure is insufficient to handle the wet season, with drains often being blocked and resultant flooding being common. This creates property damage and health concerns. Thirty-six water channels lie within the city in addition to its rivers. These often collect rainwater; however, the growing urbanisation of the city is reducing infiltration capacity, worsening flood risks. There is no city-wide sewerage system. As of 2010, only 30.3% of households had access to a sceptic tank. The most common sewage disposal system was pit latrines, which were used by 50.7% of households. Among households with toilets, 97% were flushed through the manual pouring of water. Wastewater is often collected from some areas by trucks. Some wastewater is treated in ponds in Tasitolu. Dili also has one of the country's two septage treatment facilities. A Sanitation and Drainage Masterplan was created for the city in 2012, envisioning the creation of eight wastewater treatment systems in the city by 2025.

As of 2014, Dili produces 108 tons of solid waste per day, over half of which is biodegradable. The government-funded waste collection system covers Cristo Rei, Dom Aleixo, Nain Feto, and Vera Cruz, with waste being collected by a mixture of government trucks and private trucks contracted by the government. Collected waste is disposed in a landfill in Tibar, which was established during the Indonesian period. Metal collected by waste pickers is sold to Malaysia and Singapore for recycling, while some biodegradable waste is composted by a private company. Some waste is burnt. Waste collection schedules are variable, with some areas receiving daily collection and some receiving none. Collection is less frequent in Hera and Tibar than in Dili proper.

There are 14 hospitals around the Dili metropolitan area, nine in Dom Aleixo, three in Vera Cruz, one in Cristo Rei (in Hera), and one in Tibar. Dom Aleixo also has two health centres, with Cristo Rei having one health centre in Dili proper, and Nain Feto also having a health centre. The National Hospital of Timor-Leste is located in Dili, catering to primary and secondary health care. A specialist hospital is planned to be constructed by 2030 to deal with diseases, such as cancer, that are currently treated outside of the country.

=== Transport ===
==== Land ====
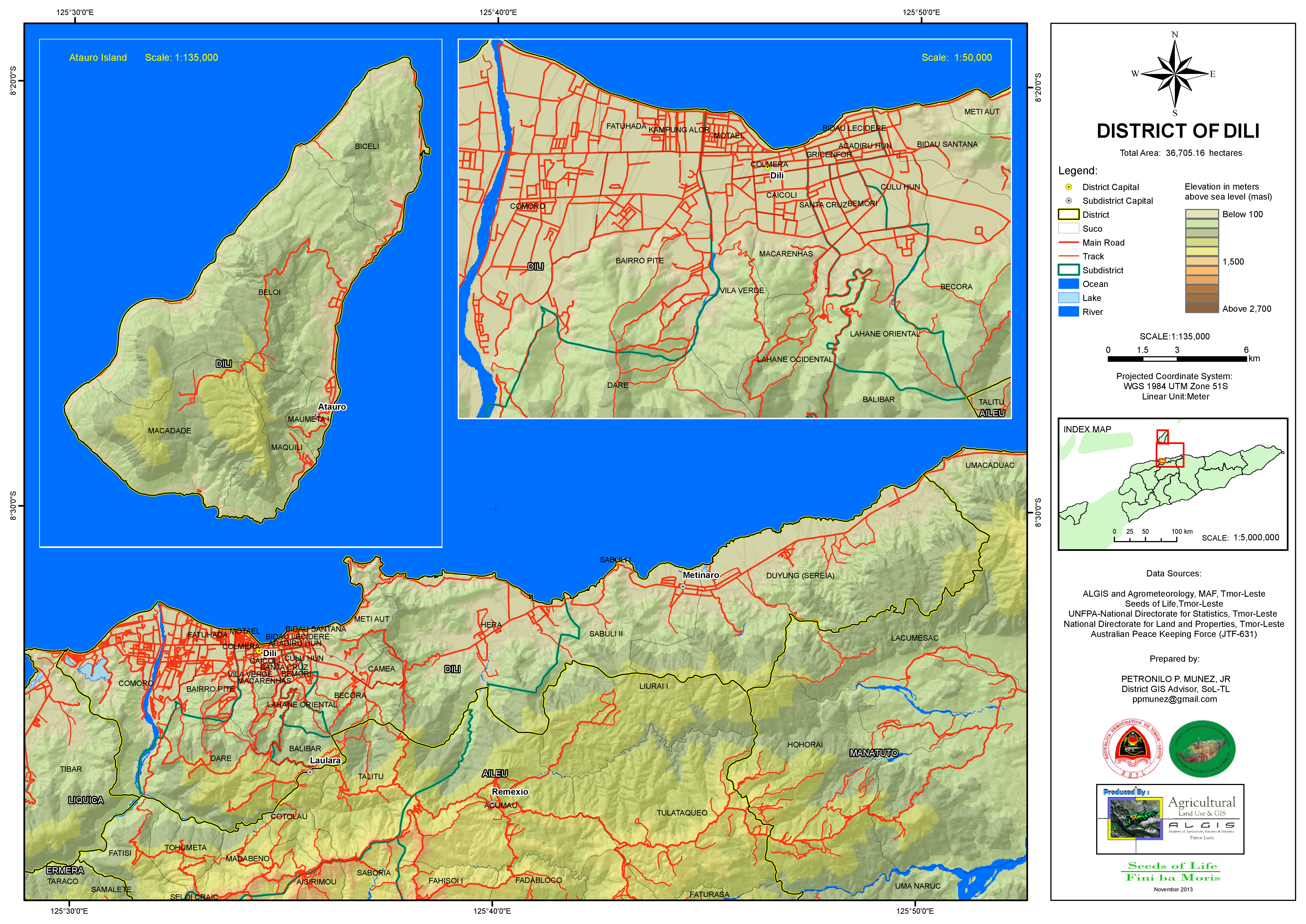
2013 road map of Dili Municipality, with the old city of Dili in the top-right inset

As of 2015, Dili Municipality had 1,475 kilometres (917 mi) of roads, of which half were classified as National, District, or Urban. The roads heading into and out of Dili to the East and West carry over 1,000 non-motorbike vehicles daily. In addition to the Eastern and Western national roads, a third national road extends south from the city. Within Dili, there is rising congestion. Poor road quality is the most common cause of accidents and delays. Many roads are unpaved, and within the old quarter, streets are often one-way. The only four lane roads in the city are National Road A01 and Banana Road. As of 2016, there were four roundabouts and 11 intersections with traffic lights. Few routes travel along the east-west axis, and for most of the time since independence there was only one vehicular crossing across the Comoro river. This bridge was expanded from two lanes to four lanes in June 2013. The two-lane Hinode Bridge was opened upriver in September 2018, connecting Banana road to National Road No 03. It is expected that this bridge will also be expanded to four lanes in the future.

The usual form of public transportation within the city are the minibus and microlet, which are operated by private companies that purchase route franchises from the government. Each vehicle usually has a capacity of ten people. There are no formal schedules and few official bus stops. Fares are cheap, at $0.25. Dili is also served by a fleet of air-conditioned blue taxis, whose drivers are expected to speak Tetum and English.

Street names are in Portuguese, as are many official signs labelling locations. Tetum is used for more informational signage. English and Indonesian are rare in official signage, but are more common elsewhere. Chinese is used on some informal signage, while non-Tetum Timorese languages are not used. Even under Indonesian rule, during which the use of Portuguese was banned, Portuguese street names like Avenida Marechal Carmona remained unchanged, although they were prefixed with the Indonesian word Jalan or 'road'.

==== Sea ====
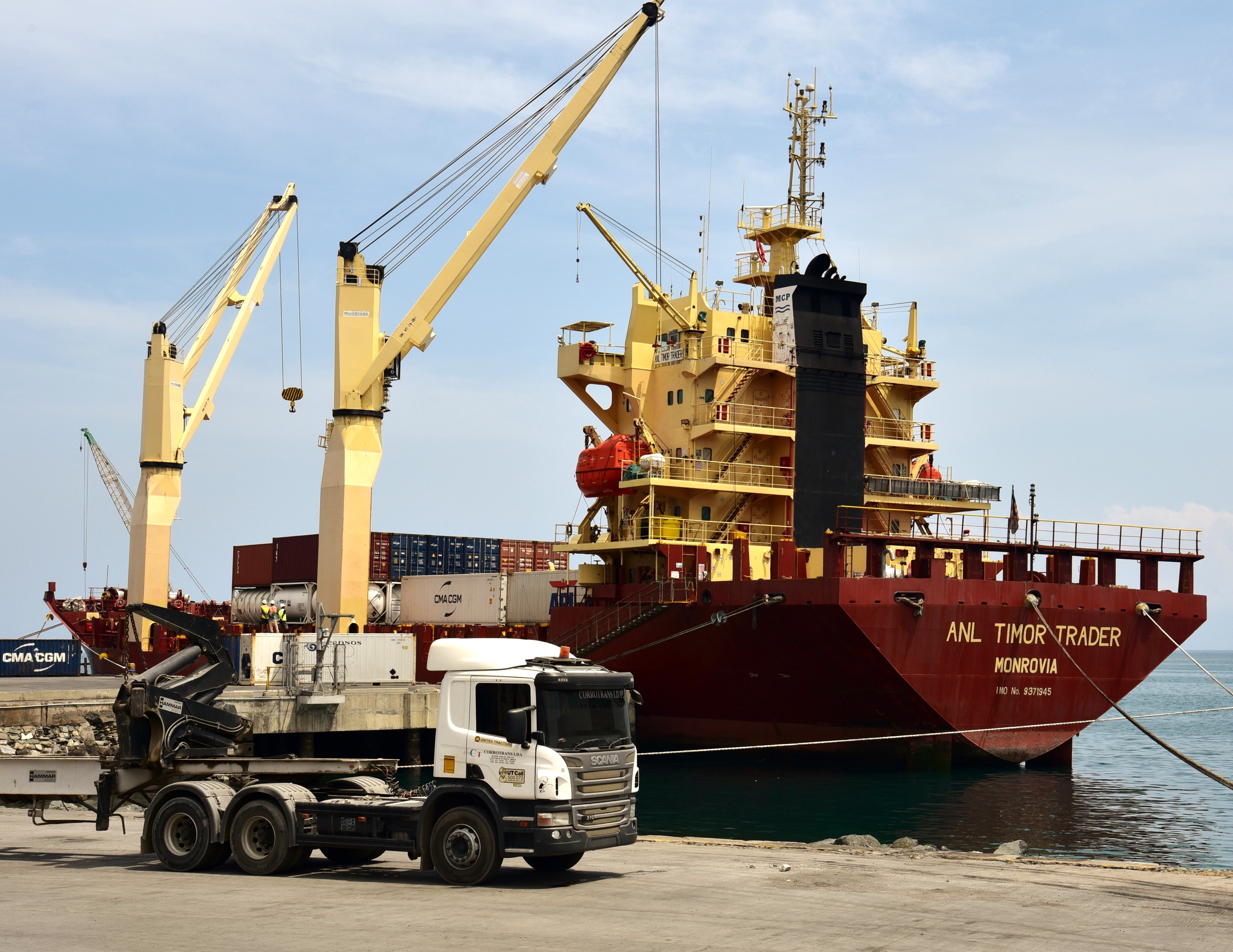
Cargo ship in the Port of Dili in 2018, before it was converted to a passenger port

The Port of Dili has a total berth length of 289.2 metres (949 ft). Depths alongside the berth range from 5.5 metres (18 ft) to 7.5 metres (25 ft). This port was previously the only international cargo reception port in the country, but its capacity is insufficient to meet import needs. The Tibar Bay Port was thus planned to handle all cargo shipping, leaving the current Dili port to become a dedicated ferry terminal. Tibar Bay Port was expected to be built starting in 2015, and scheduled for opening in 2020. On 3 June 2016 the government signed a Public-private partnership agreement with Bolloré, giving the company a 30-year least on the new port. A construction tender was awarded to the China Harbour Engineering Company in December 2017. Construction began on 30 August 2019, with completion scheduled for August 2021. As of December 2020, construction was 42% complete, with delays including Chinese workers returning to China during the COVID-19 pandemic. The port was then expected to open in April 2022. The port received its first ships on 30 September that year, and was officially inaugurated on 30 November 2022.

A dry port has been created 8 kilometres (5.0 mi) from the main Port of Dili, and there is a naval port in Hera. Cargo operations in Dili Port halted from 1 October 2022. A twice-weekly ferry service operates between Dili and Oecusse, and a ferry travels between Dili and Atauro once a week. The Dili Port serves as the main link for these locations with the rest of the country. These ferries deposit people and vehicles onto a slipway, rather than a dedicated berthing.

==== Air ====
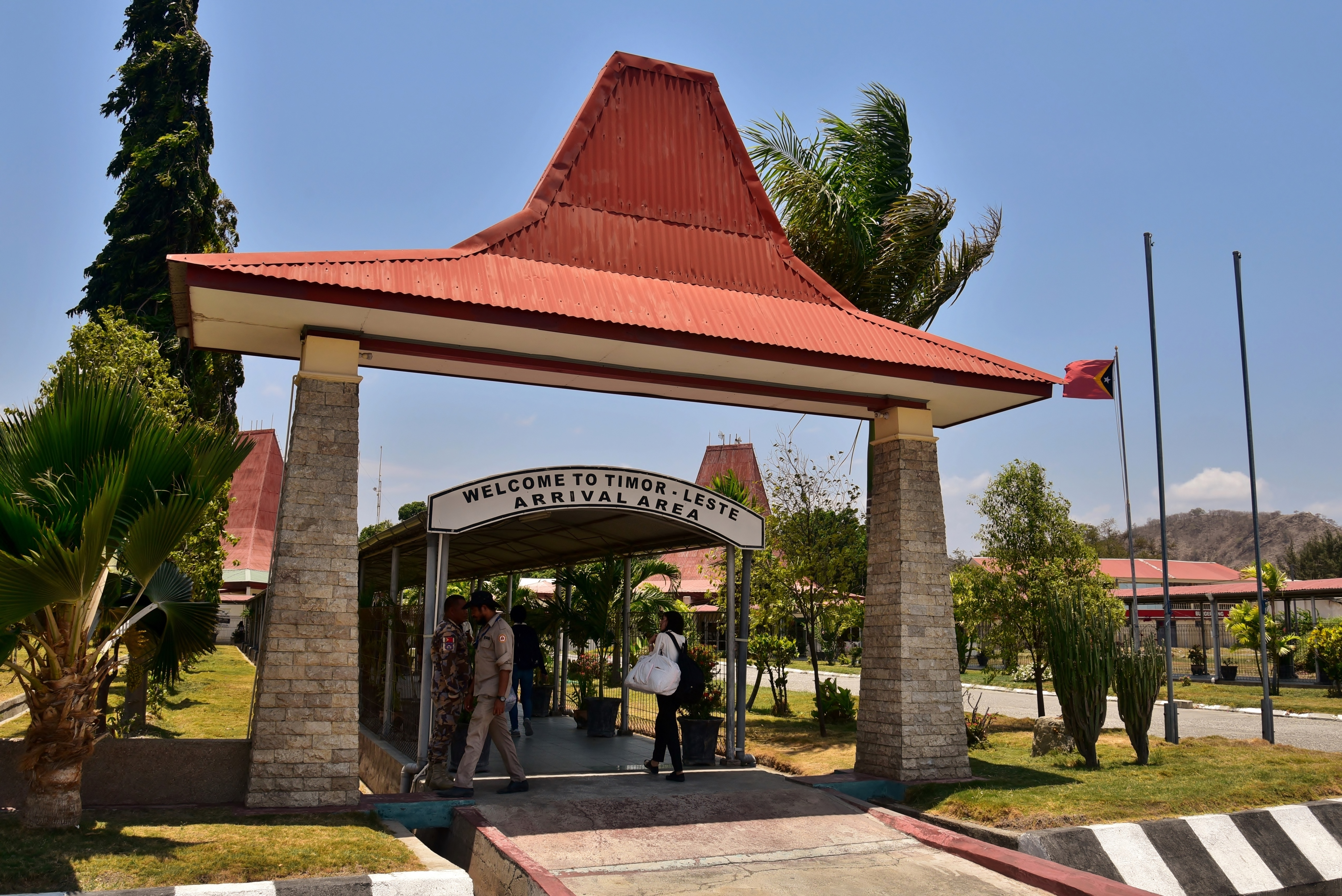
Dili International Airport

The Presidente Nicolau Lobato International Airport, named after independence leader Nicolau Lobato, is located in the city. It serves regular flights to Darwin (Australia), Denpasar (Indonesia), and Singapore. In 2014, it served 198,080 passengers and 172 tons of cargo. It has one runway, which is 1,850 metres (6,070 ft) long and 30 metres (98 ft) wide, lying 8 metres (26 ft) above mean sea level. A lack of runway lighting prevents night-time landings, so the airport operates from 6 am to 6 pm. The passenger terminals were originally domestic terminals during the Indonesian period, leaving them ill-designed to handle international customs and immigration. Due to the size of the runway, only medium-sized planes such as the A319 and the B737 can be accommodated, and there is limited space for aircraft parking. The runway is constrained by the sea and the Comoro river, although there are plans to extend the runway through land reclamation and/or by bridging the river. A new international terminal is also planned. Despite this, it is thought the airport may be able to handle capacity requirement until 2030.

This is the only functioning international airport in Timor-Leste, though there are airstrips in Baucau, Suai and Oecusse used for domestic flights. Until recently, Dili's airport runway has been unable to accommodate aircraft larger than the Boeing 737 or C-130 Hercules, but in January 2008, the Portuguese charter airline EuroAtlantic Airways operated a direct flight from Lisbon using a Boeing 757, carrying 140 members of the Guarda Nacional Republicana.

== Culture ==
Within the city, cultural differences exist not only between different ethnolinguistic groups, but between more established residents of the city, and recent immigrants who retain different cultural practices. Legal traditions reflecting Portuguese and Indonesian rule do not always align with customary practices, such as in the recognition of marriages. Those who migrate internally into Dili retain cultural and identity links to their rural areas of origin, which are passed down through generations. Urban residents often return to rural areas for traditional ceremonies, especially during the dry season, and elections.

Local communities have important traditional houses, as well as sacred natural areas including specific trees, rocks, and wells, as well as a number of Uma Lulik (sacred houses). As in the rest of the country, village chiefs continue to have some influence in Dili's communities. However, with suco populations being more diverse in Dili than in rural areas, suco chief power is not as established or effective. Community links are instead more common at aldeia levels, or even established through religious or economic links instead. New arrivals often settle near those from the same area of origin, leading Dili's urban population to have formed into a patchwork of different communities. Migration back and forth from Dili to rural areas is not uncommon. Furthermore, while rural sucos are often somewhat culturally homogenous and linked by family relationship, these administrative boundaries do not map with the cultural settlement patterns of modern Dili.

There is some more homogeneity at the aldeia level due to families settling near relatives, although this is also not consistent. Aldeia nearer the outskirts, or in areas formerly populated by Indonesian civil servants, are both more densely populated and particularly heterogenous both ethnolinguistically and socioeconomically. In diverse aldeias, smaller communities sometimes develop with their own informal leadership. Some urban areas exhibit occupational or status-based segregation. Core urban areas are dominated by relatively wealthy families, often those that were considered mestiços or assimilados under Portuguese rule. Some aldeias mostly consist of those of foreign descent, or of transient students.

Dili contains a number of local and often youth collectivities. While sometimes described as gangs, many function more as social collectivities integrated into their local community. Such groups have a long history, many forming as an act of resistance against Indonesian rule. Some street art continues to reflect a theme of resistance. The composition of these groups often reflects areas of rural origin, and the broader East-West divide that exists within the country.

The national government has crafted a culture policy that includes the provision of cultural facilities in Dili and aims to have the city reflect diverse cultural influences. The development of cultural facilities has included the building up of cultural institutions such as libraries and museums, and the development of audio-visual multimedia centres through which information will be more accessible. The City of Peace campaign seeks to maintain stability in the capital by bringing youth together for common discussions and by promoting a shared sense of national pride. Large events in which locals can work together on shared goals and security services are given roles are important parts of this campaign. One important event is the Dili City of Peace marathon, first held in June 2010, following which it became an annual event. This includes a full marathon, a half marathon, and a seven-kilometre "Run for Peace".

Dili had no cinema until 2011, when one opened in a new shopping centre known as Timor Plaza. The country's first locally produced feature film, Beatriz's War, was released a couple of years later. In 2019, the city hosted the first Dili International Film Festival, which was repeated in 2020. Radio is very popular, and the city has 13 FM radio stations.

== International relations ==
=== Diplomatic missions ===
==== Embassies ====
- Australia
- Brazil
- Brunei
- China
- Cuba
- Indonesia
- Japan
- South Korea
- Malaysia
- New Zealand
- Philippines
- Portugal
- Thailand
- United States

==== Consulate generals ====
- Poland

==== Honorary consulates ====
- Mexico
- United Kingdom
- Chile
- Germany

=== Twin towns – sister cities ===
Dili is twinned with the following places:

- Canberra, Australia (2004)
- Coimbra, Portugal (2002)
- Darwin, Australia (2003)
- Lisbon, Portugal (2001)
- Macau, China (2024)
- Manila, Philippines (2011)
- Margao, India (2001)
- Okinawa, Japan (2005)
- Praia, Cape Verde (2001)

== See also ==
- List of people from Dili
