= History of Dili =

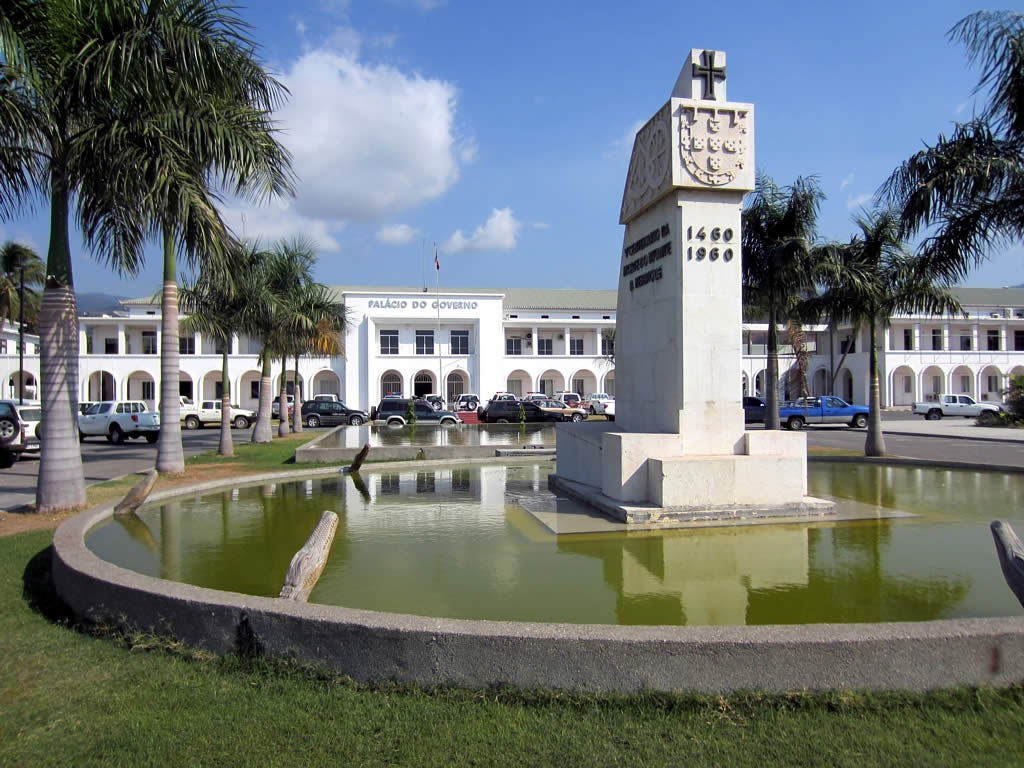
Government palace, Dili. In front of it is the monument to Prince Henry the Navigator

Dili became the capital of the Portuguese colonial possessions in the Lesser Sunda Islands in 1769. Today, Dili is the capital of Timor-Leste (formerly East Timor).

== Founding ==
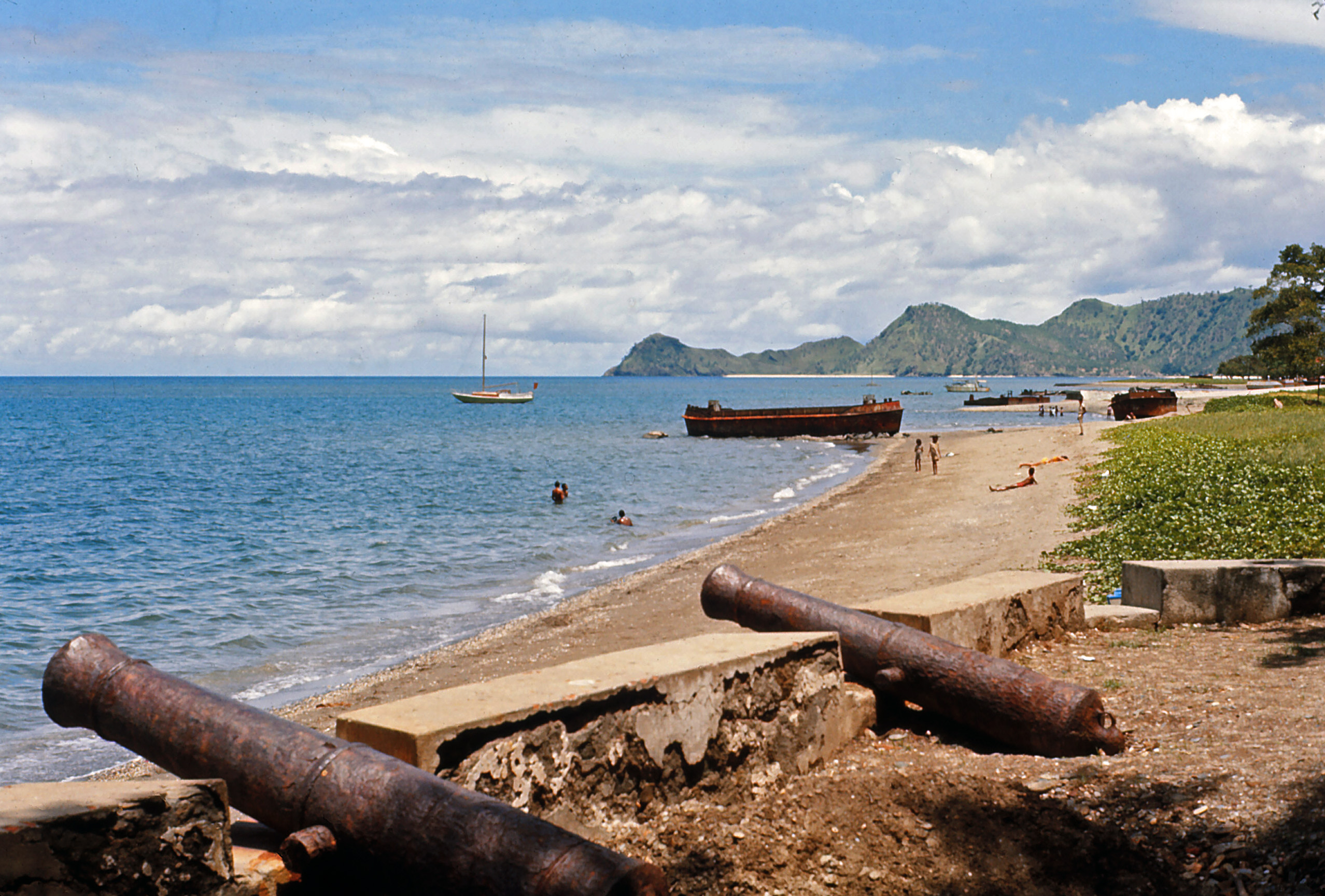
Portuguese cannons at the bay of Dili (1971)

According to legend, the place name "Dili" is derived from the Tetum word "ai-dila" for papaya. According to this, the Portuguese first heard the name of this fruit when they reached the Bay of Dili in 1520. However, this cannot be true, as Mambai was spoken in the region at that time. Tetum only spread to Dili when it became the capital of Portuguese Timor. Furthermore, papaya is an American fruit that only came to Southeast Asia through the Europeans. The origin of the name "Dili" seems rather to lie in the Bunak word "zili" (English: "cliff"), which refers to the cliffs behind the city. This is an indication that Papuan language, such as Bunak, was probably spoken in the region even before the Austronesian languages; Mambai and Tetum.

In 1730, Governor Pedro de Melo (1729-1731) formed alliances with the Liurai of Manatuto and other rulers of the region - a circumstance that would facilitate the later relocation of the colonial capital from Lifau to Dili. A year later, Governor Pedro de Rego Barreto da Gama e Castro (1731-1734) established a Portuguese garrison in Manatuto. Missionaries founded a seminary in Manatuto in the mid-18th century.

On 10 October 1769, Governor António José Teles de Meneses began to build Dili after the Portuguese had been driven out of Lifau in the west of the island by the Topasses on 11 August 1769 (see: Cailaco Rebellion). Originally, Vemasse was the destination, but favourable conditions were found in Dili to establish a new capital. The bay and the offshore island of Atauro offered protection to anchored ships and there was drinking water and plains for agriculture. The surrounding swamps, however, were to cause problems. Shortly after Meneses' arrival, 42 Liurais swore allegiance to Portugal in Dili, including Dom Alexandre, ruler of Motael, who gave Portugal the entire plain of Dili to the surrounding mountains by treaty. In addition, Dom Alexandre assured the Portuguese of timber and, for the defence of the settlement, men and horses. Due to the Dominicans' previous contacts with the Timorese rulers, who had already founded missions in Manatuto and Viqueque, Portugal was able to rely on relatively large support from the Liurais at this time, as was not the case later. The city rights of a vila, meaning "small town", were granted to Dili as early as 10 October 1769. In 1772, in addition to 40 Europeans, many Indians from Goa and Mozambique lived in Dili; a total of 750 people, half of whom were slaves. In 1779, a fire destroyed large parts of the archive with many documents from the founding period.

In the early years, the place was little more than a collection of wooden huts with an earthen wall as an outer fortification and a church dedicated to St. Anthony. Construction of the first stone fortress began on 22 September 1796 under Governor João Baptista Verquaim (1794-1800), as at that time the Maubara and Sonba'i empires, allied with the Netherlands, were at war with various vassals of Portugal. In addition, Dili was vulnerable to attack by other colonial powers, such as France and Britain. Under Governor José Joaquim de Sousa (1800-1803), the fortress was equipped with cannons.

== 19th century ==
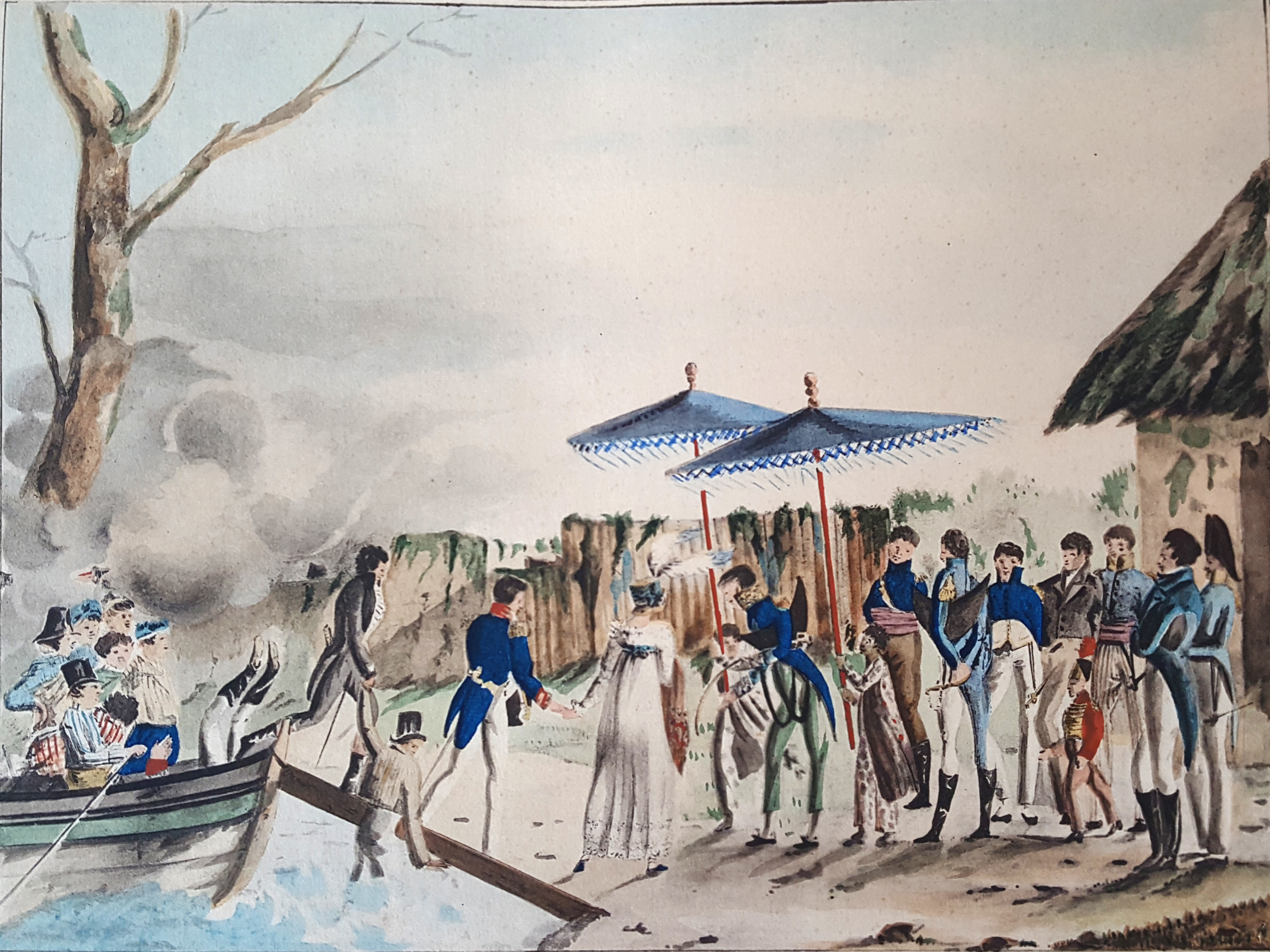
Louis and Rose de Freycinet welcomed in Dili (1818)

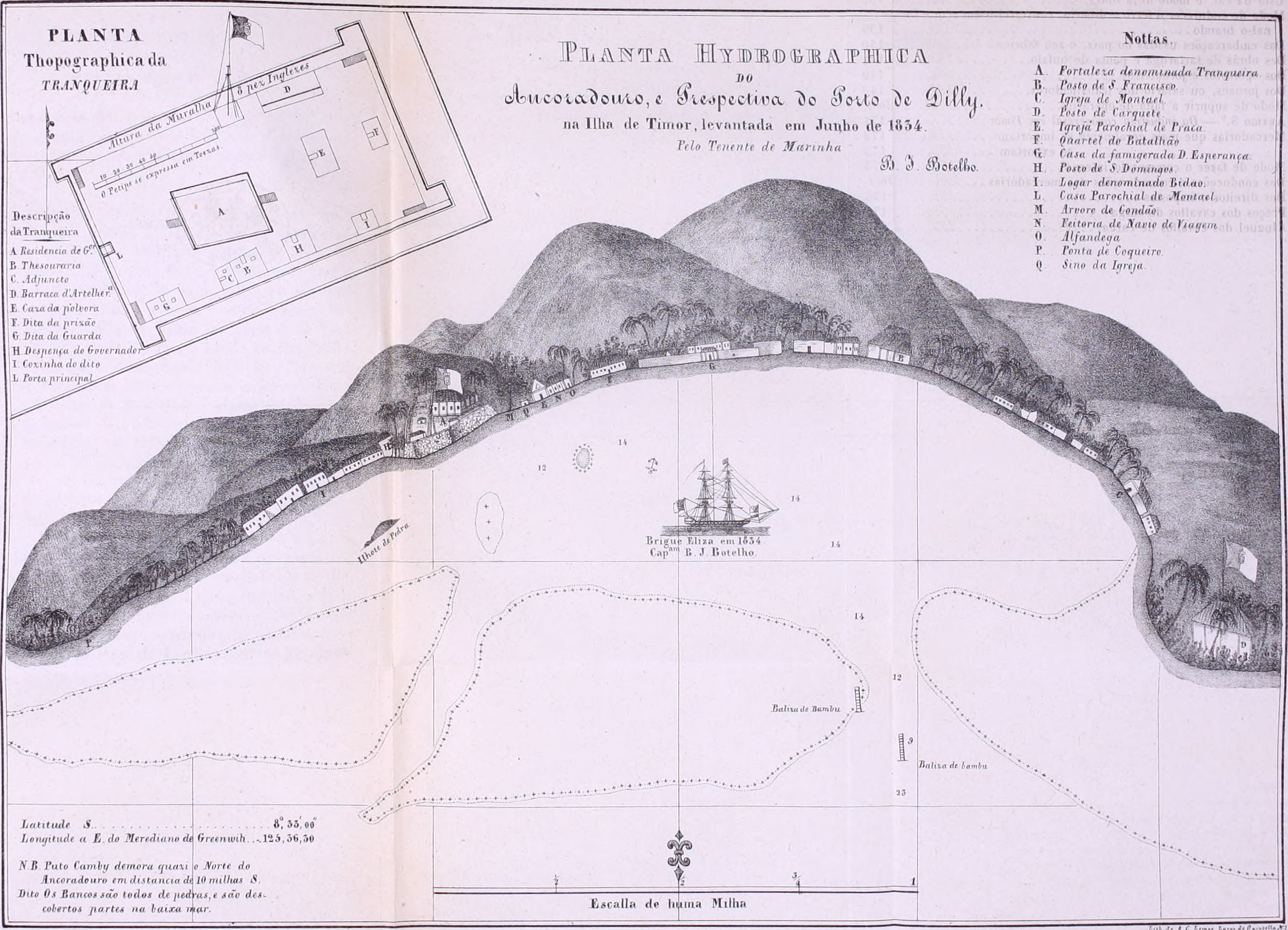
Plan of the Bay and Fortress of Dili (1843)

In 1813, Dili had 1,768 inhabitants, including 688 African slaves, but not counting the indigenous population. Although there are no visible traces of these Africans left on Timor today, the Portuguese slave trade brought 200 to 250 Mozambican slaves across the Indian Ocean to East Asia by 1830. Apart from the fortress, the governor's house and St. António's Church, the place still consisted only of huts with roofs made of palm fronds. It was not until 1834 that Governor José Maria Marques finally began to develop Dili into a real city. An avenue was laid out along the shore and, in addition to a new governor's residence, an infantry barracks was built. New roads connected the centre with the outskirts. The town was granted the rights of a cidade (large town), which went far beyond the rights of a vila (small town) granted in 1769, in January 1864.

From January to April 1861, the British explorer Alfred Russel Wallace visited Dili. He described the place as even "shabbier" than the Dutch possessions in the region. All the buildings, including the church and the customs house, were made only of mud without any decoration. The only stone building was the governor's house, a small whitewashed building. The town was surrounded by swamps, which is why Dili was considered malarial and, according to Wallace, half of Dili's European inhabitants suffered from fever at all times. At that time, 3,000 Europeans, Indians, Chinese and Timorese lived in Dili. During the 1861 rebellion, Dili was threatened by the rebel Liurai of Laclo and Ulmera. On 10 June, Governor Afonso de Castro declared a state of emergency and had weapons handed out to civilians and even to Dili's Chinese population. The Laclo uprising was crushed at the end of August and a state of siege was lifted on Dili. Portugal's victory was celebrated extensively by Castro in Dili, including the traditional Likurai dance performed by the women for the men returning home from the war. The heads of the slain enemies were carried through the town in a procession.

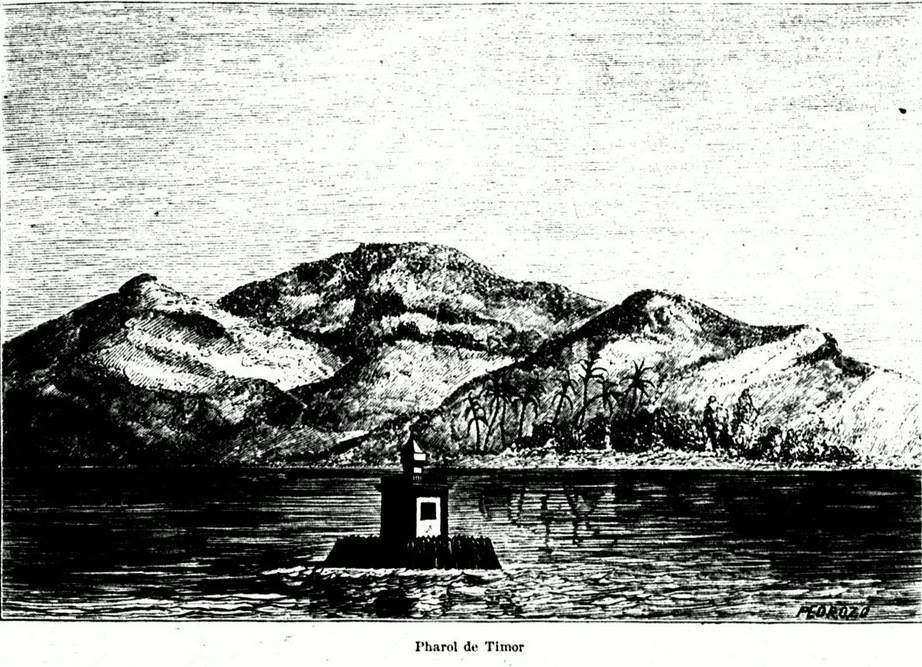
The "Lighthouse of Timor"(1864)

On 18 September, 1,200 indigenous warriors gathered in Dili to take on Ulmera. They were joined by another 3,000 men from Liquiçá. Ulmera was overrun and the ruler of Ulmera and his son were brought to Dili as prisoners. There another victory celebration was held, where the captured Liurai had to kneel down and agree to pay a large sum of compensation. The heads of the fallen opponents were also presented again. Castro later wrote of the rebellion: "It takes strength, not to bully, but to make an indolent people obey the laws and work." Castro's successor José Manuel Pereira de Almeida (1863-1864) had the fortifications of the fortress upgraded, barracks for soldiers and officers built and the governor's residence expanded. The hospital of Lahane (since 1860, today in the Suco Lahane Ocidental), the bridge and road to Lahane, a prison and a school for the sons of the Liurais were also completed. The Timorese clergyman Jacob dos Reis e Cunha, who had been educated overseas, was the first to teach there.

On 24 August 1866, large parts of Dili burnt down. The military barracks, the ammunition depot, the church, the treasury, the governor's palace and 15 private houses fell victim to it. The last parts of the archives from the Lifau period were also lost. There were no fatalities. The governor of Macau appealed to the population for donations for the reconstruction of Dili. A total of 2,630 patacas were collected, one fifth of which came from Macau's Chinese population. In 1867, Macau's governor José Maria da Ponte e Horta personally brought medicine and also pictures and ornaments for the new Dili church. It had stone walls and was 40 metres long and 10 metres wide. It had eight windows on each side, two in the front and two in the back. However, the reconstruction of the city progressed slowly due to the lack of materials and skilled labour. In 1869, a cholera epidemic raged. Governor João Clímaco de Carvalho (1870-1871) temporarily considered relocating the capital completely to the climatically more favourable and less unhealthy Lahane, one and a half kilometres from Dili's centre in the mountains - a plan that Governor Frederico Leão Cabreira (1839-1844) had also considered. But the inhabitants did not want it because of the water supply. In Dili, almost every house had a well; in Lahane, water had to be fetched from a river some distance away.

By 1870, some important buildings had been rebuilt. The rebuilt fortress of Nossa Senhora da Conceição extended to the river on the west and was of typical Portuguese design. The hydrographic mapping of the harbour was completed and Fort Carqueto protected the anchorages. Across the bay stood a lighthouse. In the main square was the prison, built of limestone. The customs house, military barracks, arsenal, school and hospital were also standing again. The governor's palace, however, is still in ruins on a map from 1870. The new governor's palace was only rebuilt between 1874 and 1881. A main road led from Bidau to Motael. Several private houses stood along this road. Bidau was the commercial centre where many Chinese, Topasses and Moradores lived. The Moradores were Timorese provided and financed by Liurais for the Portuguese forces. Several Chinese trading houses sprang up along the major streets. The neighbourhood of Lahane had also been built up. By the end of the century, several colonial-style houses and government buildings had sprung up here, beyond the malaria-infested lowlands. In 1879, a traveller described Dili as a "small, thriving town" with 4,114 inhabitants, of whom 2,498 were Catholics. However, there was a lack of cultural facilities such as theatres, concert halls, libraries or a simple central square as a meeting place. Thus, the inhabitants occupied themselves primarily with political discussions about the local authorities and the consumption of alcohol. Portuguese wine was rather rare, mostly alcoholic beverages made from sugar cane and local palm wine were consumed. At least wheat bread was baked in Dili and tea was imported from Macau. The main church, rebuilt between 1877 and 1878, was consecrated in August 1879. In 1884, Dili received street lighting, which was fired with oil from Laclubar.

The hospital in Lahane was divided into three sections: one for Europeans at four rupees, one for Chinese at three rupees and one for locals at two rupees per day. In 1877, an Australian described the hospital as a large, airy and clean building where much attention was paid to the sick. In 1883, medical officer J. Gomes da Silva was appointed head of the "Macau-Timor Health Service". He chalked up several abuses. For example, the hospital lacked a maternity ward, and of all the cemeteries in Dili, only the Chinese one met the basics for public health. He also criticised the fact that while the "uncivilised" Timorese and African soldiers bathed in the Lahane River, the European soldiers never did. In contrast, the Dutch military had already introduced a system of alternate bathing days for its colonial troops by this time. It was precisely malaria and poor hygiene that earned Dili the reputation as the unhealthiest port in the archipelago. This description is not surprising, as the death rate in Dili, while roughly equal to that of the colonies in Mozambique, was three times higher than in Macau. In 1887, there were several deaths due to diarrhoeal diseases and beriberi, which mainly claimed the lives of African soldiers.

In 1887, Governor Alfredo de Lacerda Maia was assassinated by a group of Moradores in an ambush on the road between Dili and Lahane. Groups of them were stationed in Dili, Batugade and Manatuto. Dili fell into "total terror" during the Moradores' revolt, according to the Macau press. Governor Rafael Jácome Lopes de Andrade (1888-1890) continued the expansion of Dili, connecting the suburbs with roads, providing a water supply network and erecting the new lighthouse at the port. Between December 1893 and February 1894, cholera ravaged the colony again, killing at least 1000 people. After the Maubara revolt, the bodies of the fallen had been left lying around, which led to the outbreak of the disease mainly in Maubara. But the disease was also rampant in Tibar, Atapupu and on Alor, and even Dili was not spared. Under Governor José Celestino da Silva (1891-1908), Dili experienced an increasing boom. The city took on a European face. More streets, schools, a library and a museum were built. The wetlands around Dili were drained and a water supply was created. In 1906, a modern hospital was built. Many of the buildings erected at that time did not fall victim until the Second World War.

== Beginning of the 20th century ==
News of the fall of Portugal's monarchy on 6 October 1910 reached Dili by telegram just one day later. Governor Alfredo Cardoso de Soveral Martins officially announced the proclamation of the Republic on 30 October, the blue and white flag of royal Portugal was taken down and the new green and red flag of Portugal was raised, firing 21 rounds of salutes. At this time a Masonic lodge was also formed in Dili.

In 1911, the great Manufahi rebellion broke out. Allegedly, on 5 October, the anniversary of the proclamation of the Republic, several Liurai gathered in the suburbs of Dili. According to Portuguese reports from the time, they were planning a conspiracy to murder all Europeans. The presence of an English merchant ship in the port of Dili is said to have dissuaded them from their plan.

On 19 February 1912, the Sydney Morning Herald reported:

"The greater part of the Island of Timor has revolted. The Ramea tribesmen raided Dilli, murdered many residents, and burnt many buildings. Major Langley, Lieutenant Silva, and several soldiers were killed during the street fighting. Their heads were cut off by the rebels and stuck on poles. Government House was looted."

— The Sydney Morning Herald

The report exaggerated the situation, but Dili was indeed badly affected and European families evacuated. Nevertheless, the city was saved from looting by hastily gathered defenders. For reinforcement, Portugal sent the gunboat Pátria from Macau, which arrived on 6 February. On 11 February, the English steamship Saint Albans arrived in Dili with 75 soldiers (half of them Europeans) from the Companhia Europeia da India, and on 15 February, the English ship Aldenam with the eighth Companhia Indigena de Moçambique.

Dili had 8,136 inhabitants on 31 December 1927 according to a census. At the beginning of the Estado Novo, a large number of colonial buildings were constructed, such as the governor's residence in Lahane, a new governor's palace, the city council building and other administrative buildings, but also new schools. In 1937, the Sport, Lisboa e Dili sports association was founded, and the following year, the Associacão de Beneficencia de Timor, which promoted welfare.

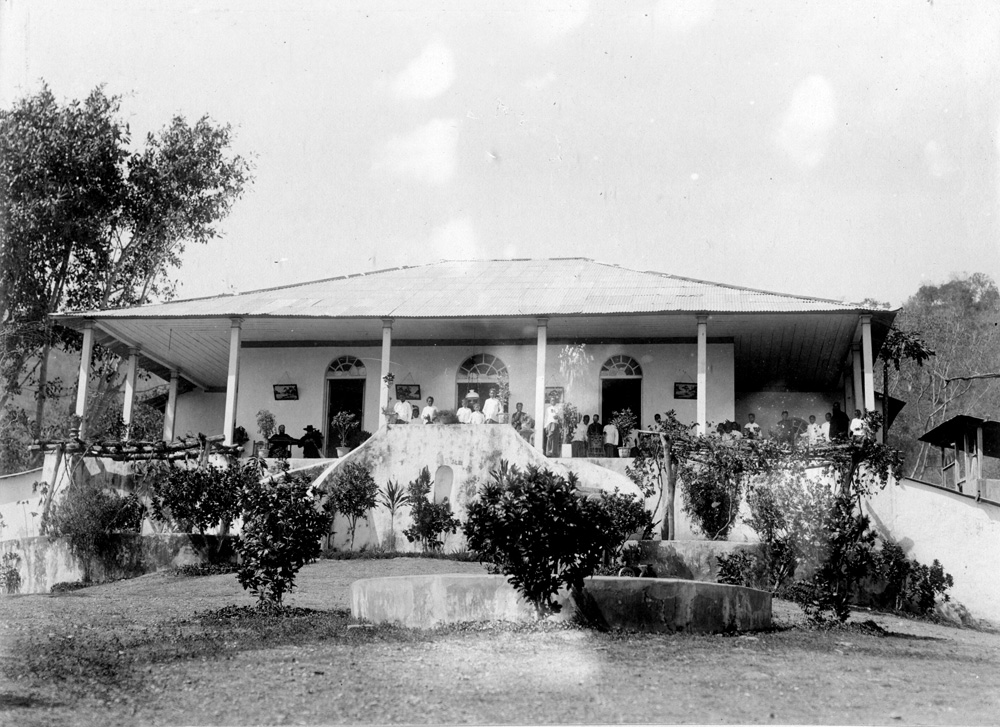
Catholic Mission in Dili, after 1900

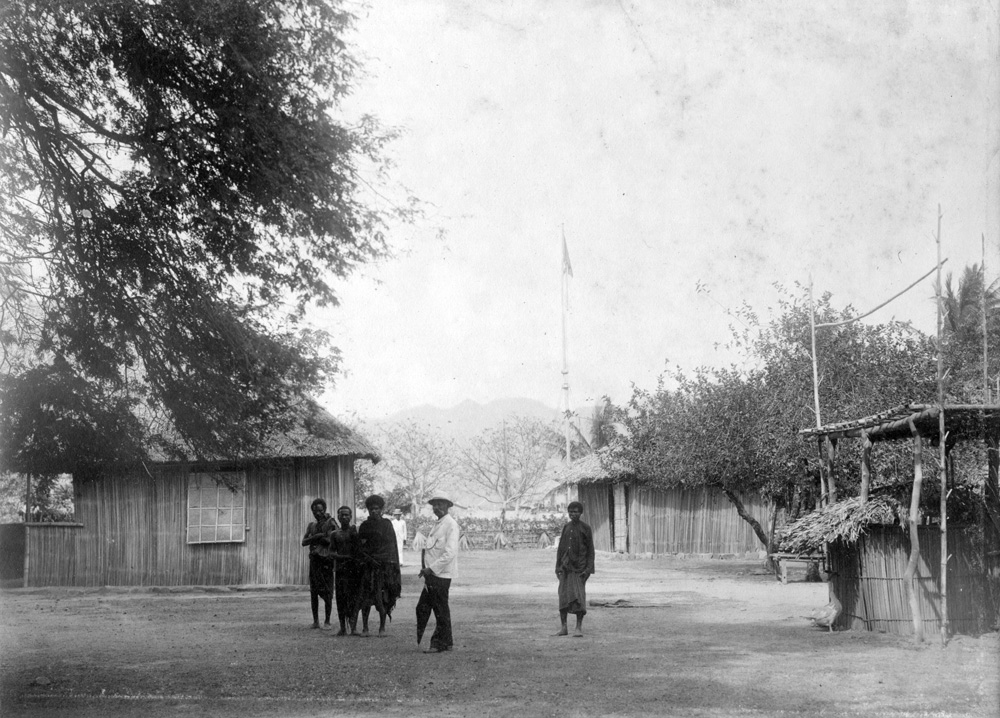
Motael in 1903

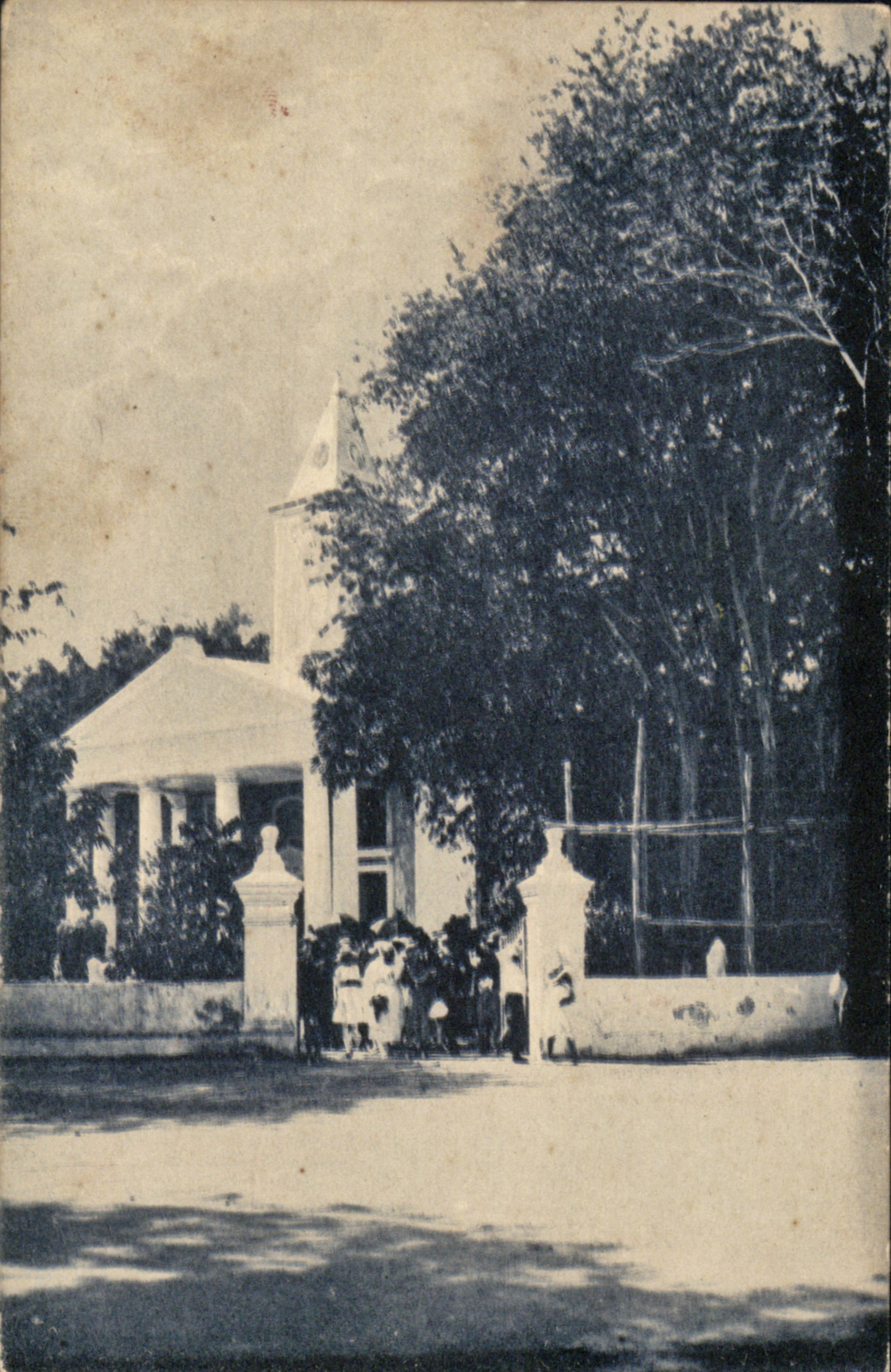
Main church of Dili, Igreja matriz, and its congregation in 1909

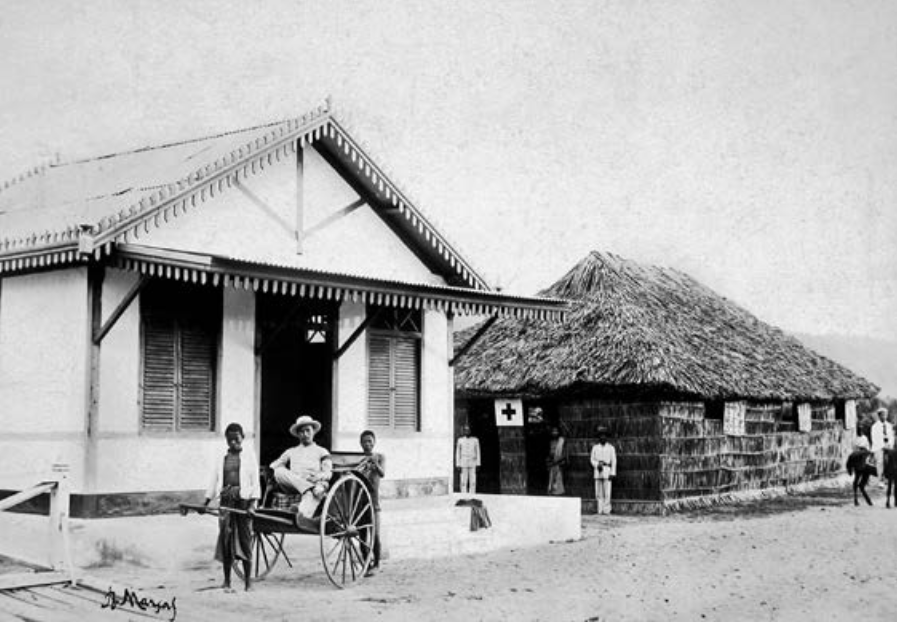
Police station and hospital in Dili, early 20th century

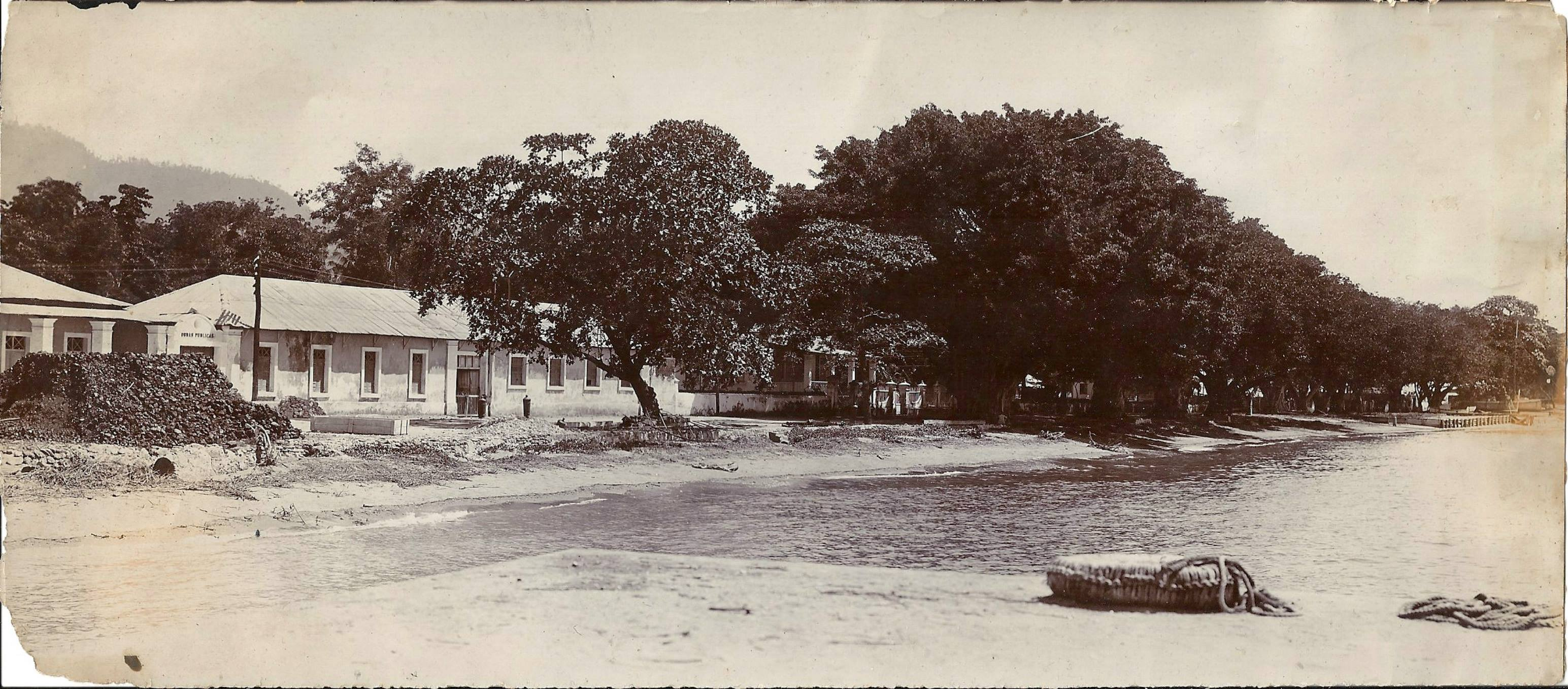
Bay of Dili in the 1930s

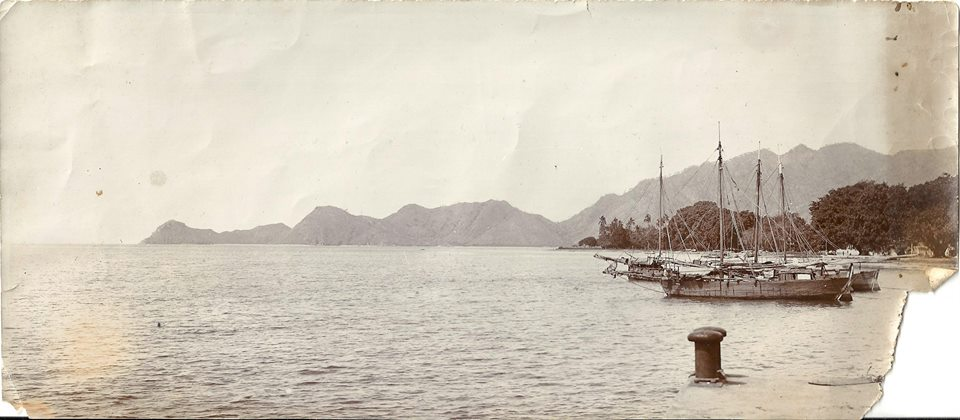
Bay of Dili in the 1930s

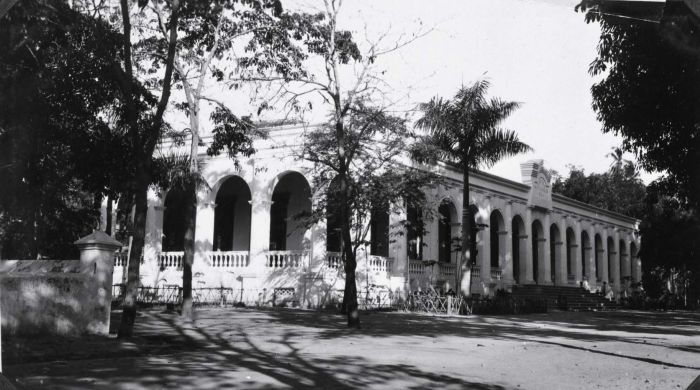
Liceu Dr. Francisco Machado in Dili, between 1930 and 1936

== Second World War (1942 until 1945) ==
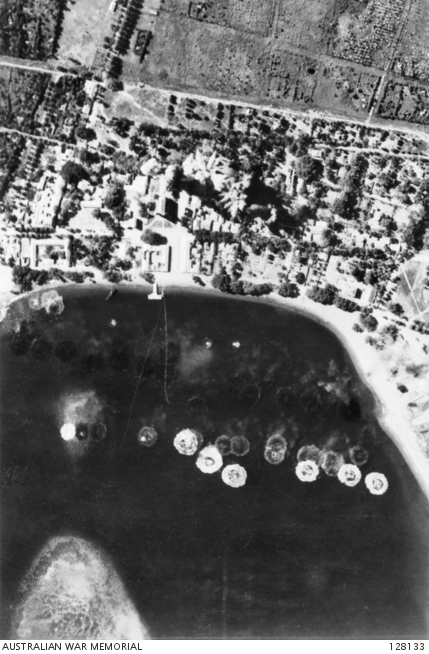
Australian air raid on Dili (1942)

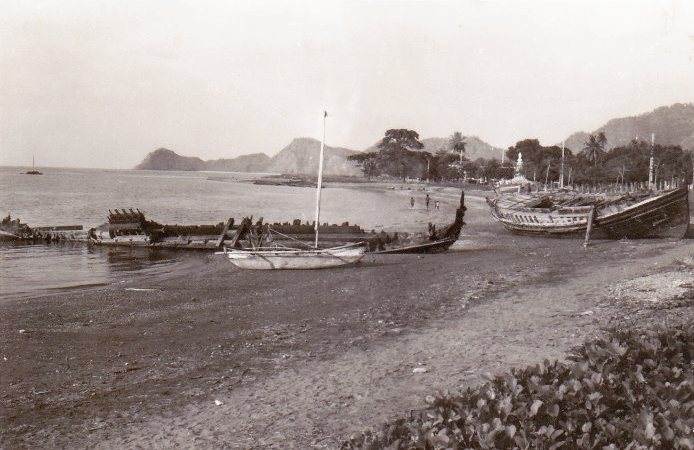
Shipwrecks from the time of the Japanese occupation (taken in 1970)

Portugal was neutral during the Second World War. However, the Allies feared that the militarily weak Portuguese Timor could be used by the Japanese as a bridge to Australia, so the Dutch and Australians briefly occupied the colony in 1941. The first Japanese air raid on Dili took place on 8 February 1942. On the night of 19–20 February 1942, the Japanese attacked from the sea with 20,000 men and occupied Dili and gradually the rest of Timor. Dili was thereafter a constant target of Allied air raids, the first of which took place on 15 March 1942. From the end of 1942, two to three Allied aircraft attacked Dili once a week, and from November onwards even daily, causing Japanese as well as Timorese and Chinese casualties. The main targets included the Japanese consulate (November 1942), the radio station (March 1943), a Portuguese ship and the hospital (February 1944). In 1943, an Allied air raid also destroyed the cathedral. The population had already left the city in June 1942. Officially, the Portuguese administration continued to exist, even though the real power in the colony lay with the Japanese Consul General. After the administrator of the Dili district, Lourenço de Aguilar, who was already despised by the Japanese, resigned due to illness, the surveyor Artur do Canto Resende agreed to take over the post. In this post, he tried to save people, distributed food and clothing and campaigned for the release of prisoners sentenced to death. Probably due to denunciation, Canto Resende was forced to resign from his post on 9 March 1944. In July 1944, he was arrested by the Japanese military police and interned to Kalabahi on the neighbouring island of Alor. Here he died in captivity on 23 February 1945.

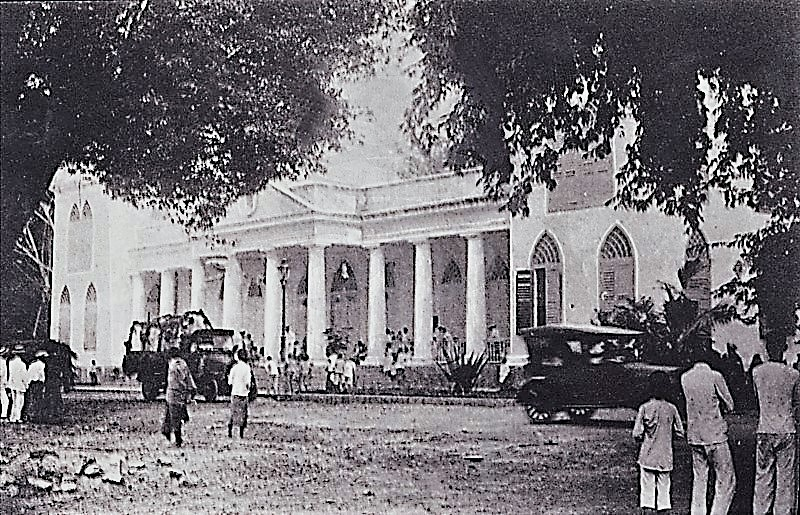
Câmara Municipal of Dili

In total, the city of Dili fell victim to 94 air raids, and at the end of the war only ten of all the city's buildings - including a hospital - remained. All public buildings, such as the cathedral on the site of today's National Parliament of Timor-Leste and the City Council building (Câmara municipal), had been destroyed.

On 26 September 1945, the official ceremony of the surrender of the Japanese in Portuguese Timor and the return of power to Portugal took place in Dili. The very next day, the long-awaited Portuguese ships Bartolomeu Dias and Gonçalves Zarco arrived in Dili. Another two days later, Portuguese troopships with over 2,000 soldiers (infantry, sappers and artillery) arrived in the colony. On board were food and building materials. The arrival of the ships was celebrated in Dili. Present were most of the Portuguese remaining in the colony, many Timorese, the commanders of Baucau and Manatuto and loyal Liurais and village chiefs.

== Last colonial years (1945 until 1975) ==
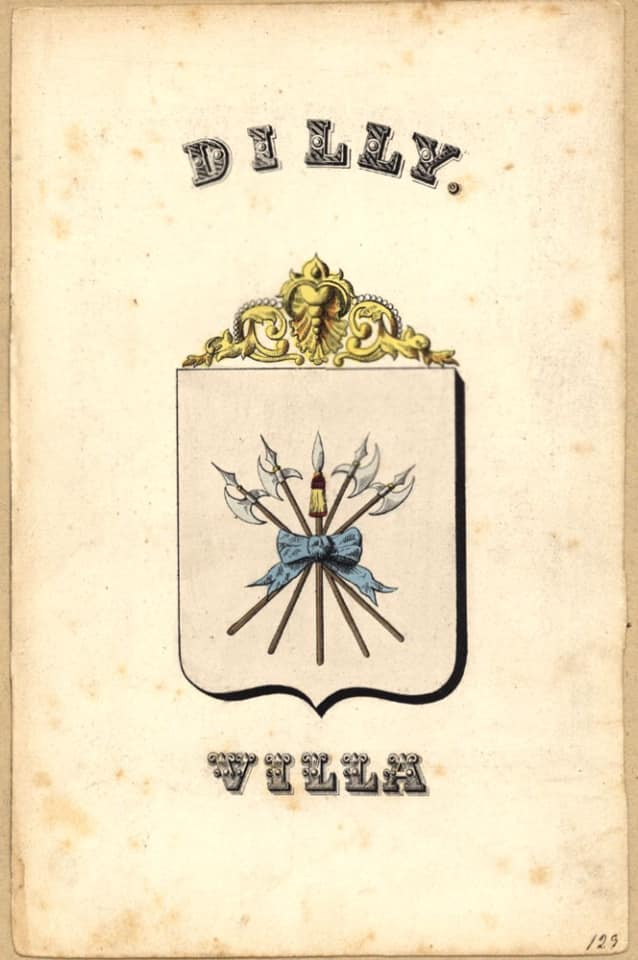
Dili's coat of arms in the 18th century

Coat of Arms of Dili 1952–1975

Flag of Dili until 1975

After the destruction during the Second World War, the general plan for the reconstruction of Dili was ready in 1951. From 1952, the architect José Manuel Galhardo Zilhão was active here. Among others, he designed the Centro de Saúde da Formosa in Gricenfor and the buildings of the Dili airport.

On 31 May 1952, Dili received its own coat of arms, which corresponded in structure to the Portuguese tradition. On a red shield rests a silver sandalwood tree between two bundles of four silver halberds and a golden lance, tied with a blue ribbon. The golden, masonry crown with five towers above the escutcheon identifies Dili as the capital of the colony. In the banner under the shield was the motto "Who sees the rising sun first" (Portuguese: "O Sol logo em nascendo vê primeiro"). The motto refers to Timor's geographical location as the easternmost Portuguese colony. Sandalwood was once the island's most important export and the halberd bundle was already found on old coats of arms of the settlement in the 18th century. The coat of arms was also carried on a white and green eight-staffed flag.

For a time, Governor Cabreira's hundred-year-old idea of moving the capital to the mountains was revived, but as the chosen site proved too small and the subsoil unstable, it was decided to rebuild Dili. The complete new plans of 1951 came from the architect João António de Aguiar. The distribution of the various ethnic groups among the different neighbourhoods was taken into account and centres for public buildings and commerce were established. The wetlands were finally to be drained. Reconstruction, however, was slow. It was only under Governor Colonel Temudo Barata (1959-1963) that the port and the electricity and water supply were restored. Schools, the hospital and bridges were also rebuilt. For civil servants and employees of the Portuguese colonial administration, a residential area of single-family and multi-family houses in typical Portuguese style was built in the Farol district in the 1950s and 1960s, which - like the Messe para Funcionários Solteiros - is still preserved today and recognisable in Dili's cityscape.

Under José Alberty Correia (governor 1963–1968), a 24-hour electricity supply was established and the city was further modernised. Various buildings were constructed: the telecommunications centre, the technical school, the post office and the Comarca prison. The seaport was modernised and expanded. With new warehouses, it was now possible to serve ships up to 7,000 tons, such as the India and the Timor of the Companhia Colonial de Navegação. Governor José Nogueira Valente Pires (1968-1972) provided new neighbourhoods with social housing to improve the health of the inhabitants. Dili now had about 10,000 inhabitants. Besides Europeans and Timorese, these were also small Chinese and Arab communities. The Portuguese were mostly colonial officials, soldiers or exiled (deportados). There were also a few hotel owners and traders who worked against the Chinese monopoly. Many of them had married Timorese women. Most of the Europeans lived in Farol. In Kampung Alor lived the Arab minority, to the east of the centre many Chinese and to the south, towards the hills, the Timorese population.

After the Carnation Revolution in 1974, the colony was supposed to be prepared for independence, but when the dominance of the left-wing Fretilin became apparent, street fighting broke out between it and the conservative UDT in Dili in 1975. Portuguese Timor's last colonial governor, Mário Lemos Pires, fled to Atauro Island, from where he tried unsuccessfully to mediate between the parties. The Fretilin emerged victorious from the fighting, but in the meantime Indonesia had begun to gradually occupy the borderlands with troops disguised as UDT supporters. Faced with the threat, the Fretilin hoped for international support and therefore declared East Timor independent from Portugal on 28 November 1975. Nine days later, on 7 December, Indonesian troops officially began invading the country and occupied Dili.

At the monument of Henry the Navigator, in front of the government palace in Dili, a mass grave with at least 72 bodies was discovered in June 2012. It is assumed that these were victims of the Indonesian invasion and subsequent executions. As the dead were relatively large, it is suspected that the victims were members of the Chinese minority who were murdered at the Toko Lay building. It is also possible that the victims died during the Second World War.

== Indonesian occupation period (1975 until 1999) ==
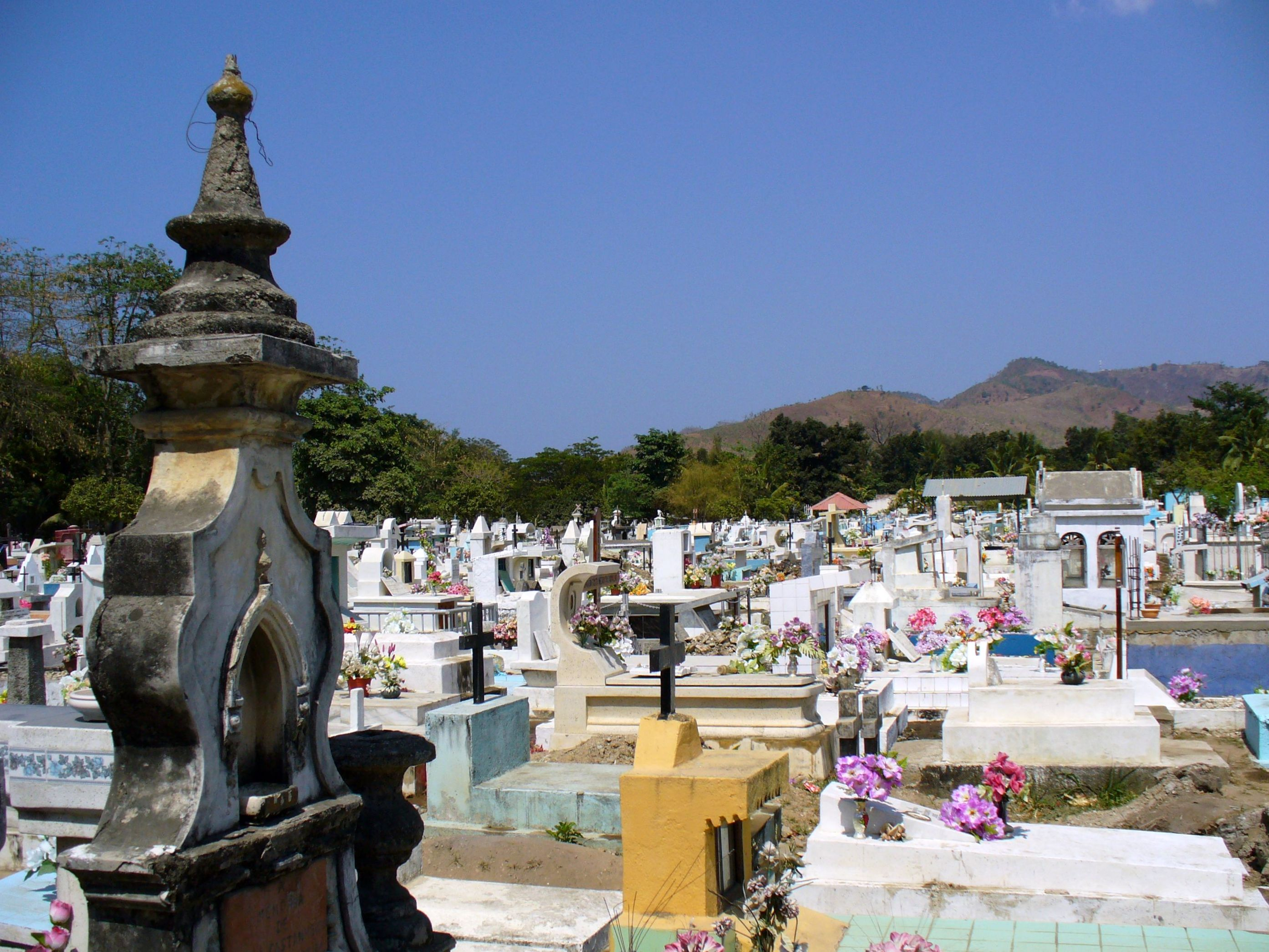
Cemetery of Santa Cruz

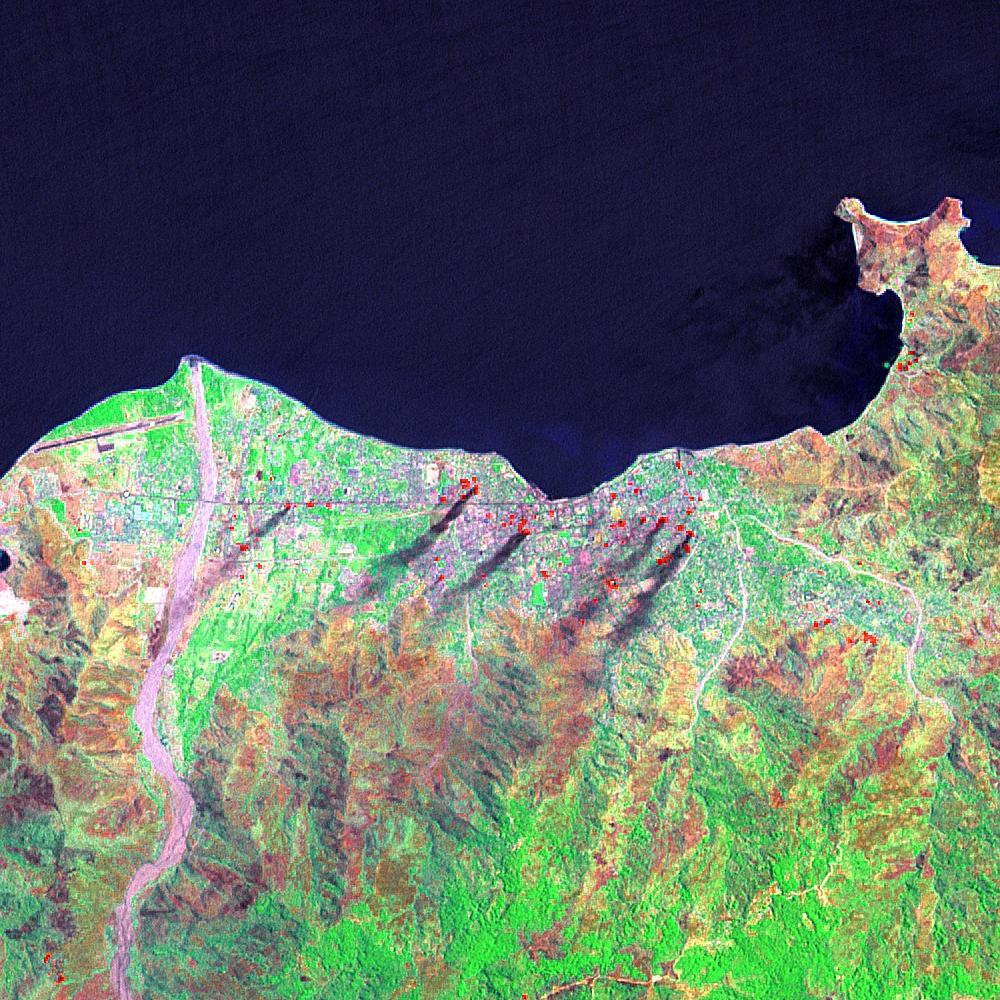
8 September 1999: Dili in Flames

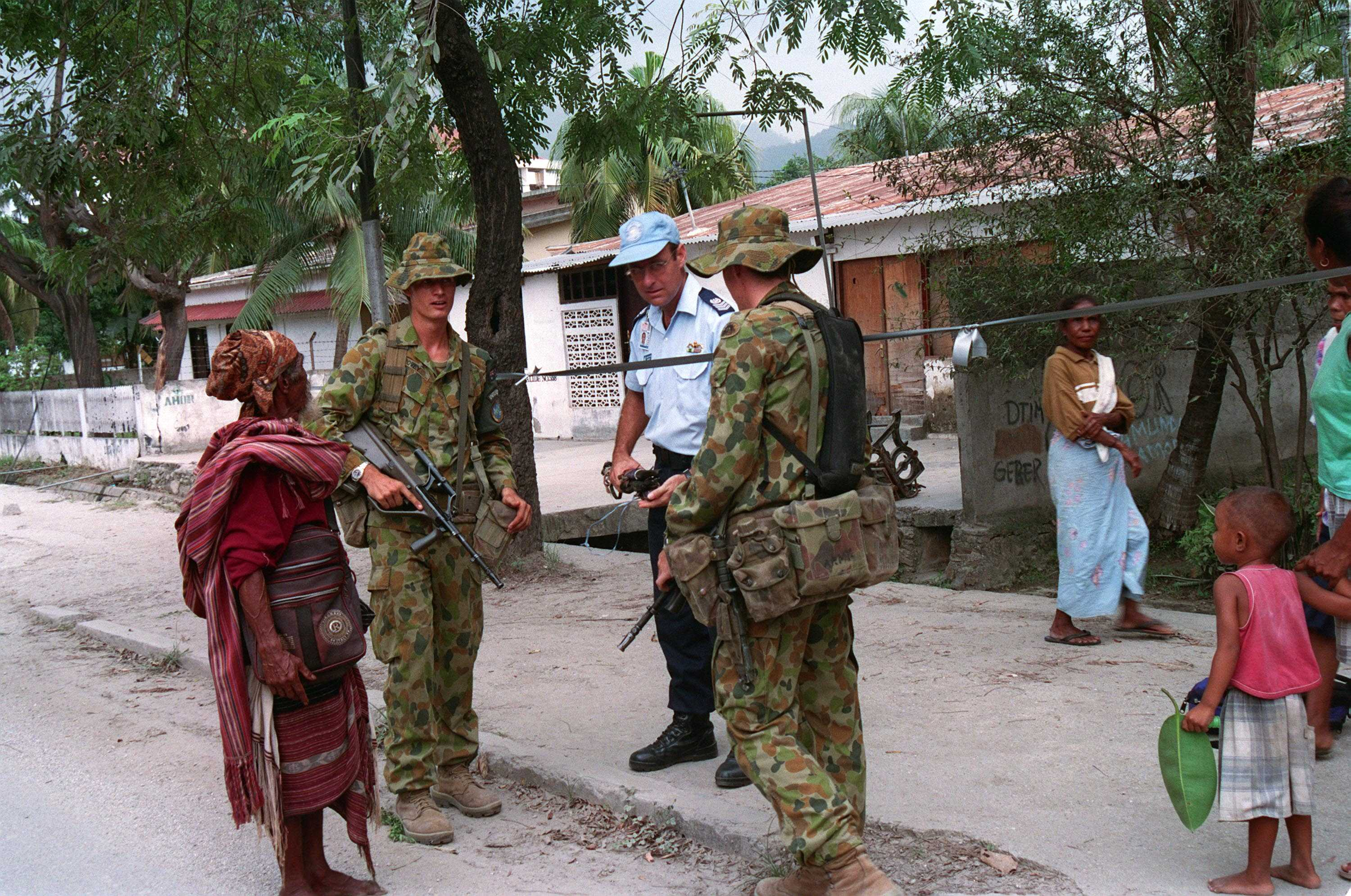
Australian INTERFET soldiers in Dili 2000

Under Falintil leader Xanana Gusmão, the Timorese resistance began to use guerrilla tactics against the occupiers. On 10 June 1980, Falintil units attacked a television station on the outskirts of the capital Dili. It was the first major attack, also called a "levantamento" (meaning uprising, insurrection), since the almost complete crushing of the resistance movement in 1978. In response, the Indonesian military killed over 100 people and tortured or exiled members of resistance fighters to Atauro Island, which was used as a prison island.

Pope John Paul II visited Dili on 12 October 1989. After mass, a group of young people unfurled banners. They shouted loudly for self-determination and against human rights violations. This embarrassing moment for Indonesia was followed by a wave of arrests and torture. The American ambassador in Jakarta, John Monjo, travelled to Dili in January 1990 to investigate the allegations of torture. Small demonstrations took place outside his place of stay, the Turismo Hotel in Dili, for three consecutive days. On 12 November 1991, a massacre after a funeral at Santa Cruz Cemetery claimed over 200 lives. The Indonesian governor at the time, Mário Viegas Carrascalão, uncovered secret executions by Indonesian soldiers, among other things.

The following year, the mayor José Abílio Osório Soares became governor of the province and was instrumental in building up the militias that spread terror and fear throughout the country. After the independence referendum on 30 August 1999, the violence escalated. The majority of the population voted for complete independence for East Timor. After the result was published on 4 September, pro-Indonesian militias went on a looting and murdering rampage through the city. At least 67 people died, about half of the buildings were damaged.

== Independence ==
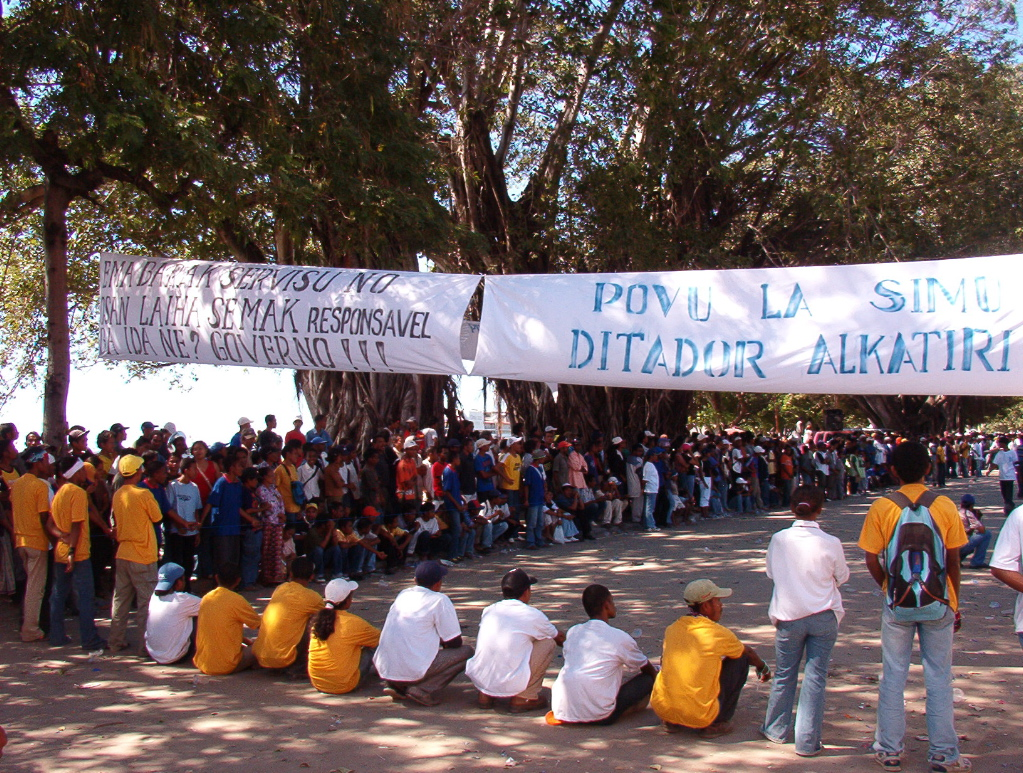
Anti-Alkatiri Demonstration in Dili 2005

On 20 September 1999, the first units of the international peacekeeping force INTERFET, mainly members of the Royal Australian Air Force (RAAF), landed at the airport near Dili. There were light clashes with members of the militias, resulting in several arrests. After a few days, the intervention force had the situation completely under control. Most of the militias had already retreated to the western part of the island. The United Nations took over the administration of the country. On 20 May 2002, Dili finally became the capital of the independent state of Timor-Leste.

One day after the arrest of a student, the house of Prime Minister Marí Alkatiri and government vehicles were set on fire during riots in Dili and other places in Timor-Leste on 4 December 2002. When the rioters went to the police station, the police opened fire. Students carried the body of a fellow student to the parliament building, where fights then broke out with the police. Shops, mostly owned by Chinese traders, were looted. The Hello Mister supermarket was set on fire. Again, police fired on the rioters and four more students were killed. Alkatiri launched an investigation and blamed foreign influence for the incidents.

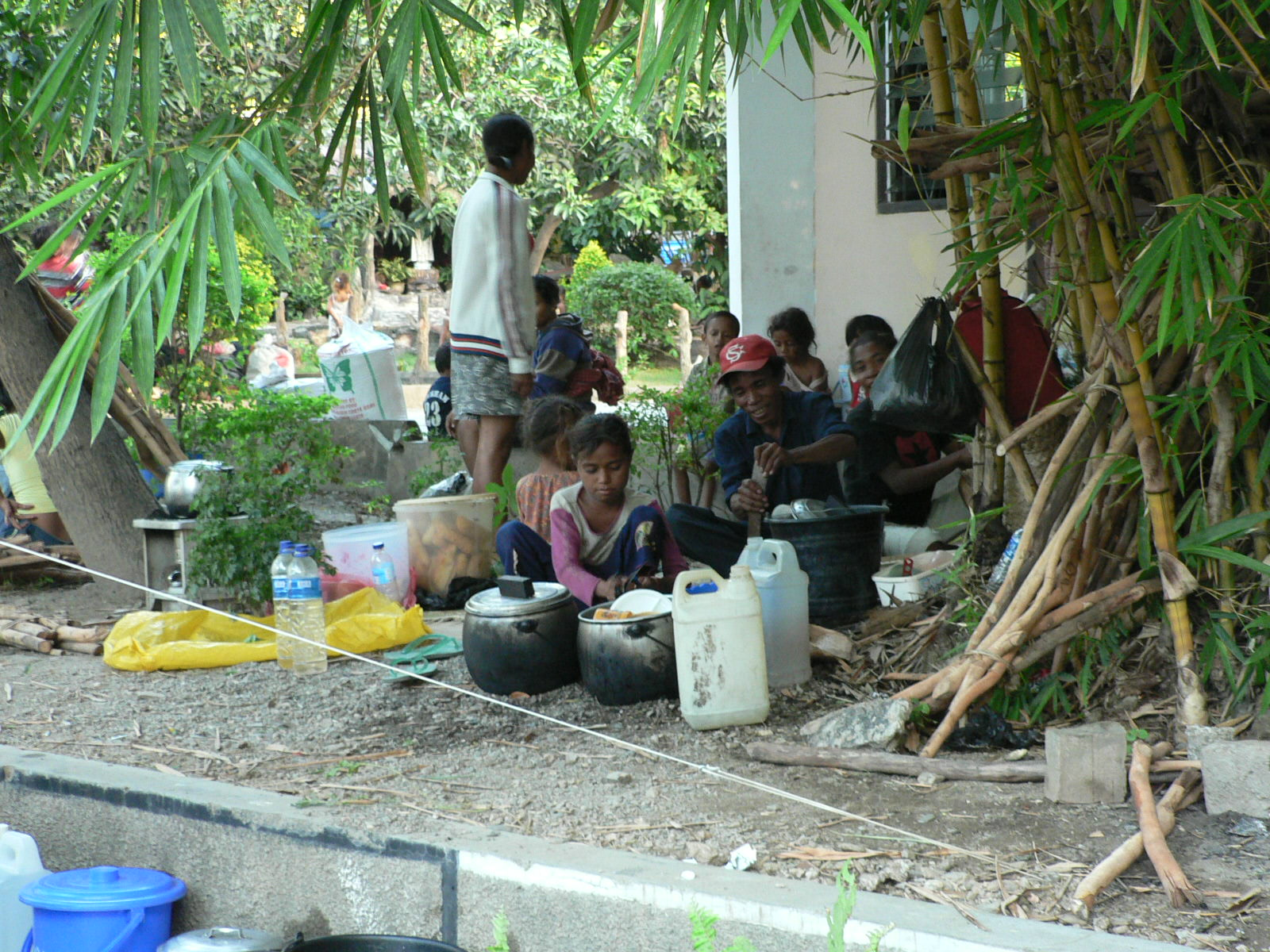
refugee camp in Balide 2006

At the end of April until October 2006, the most serious unrest since independence shook the capital and the country after 600 soldiers of the armed forces deserted due to grievances. In addition, youth gangs from the western and eastern parts of the country fought each other. Shootouts broke out between the rebels, loyal soldiers and the police. On 25 May, at least eight policemen were shot dead by mutinous soldiers and 25 others were injured. Thousands of houses were burnt down and at least 45 people died. Eventually, Prime Minister Alkatiri had to resign. Even the deployment of an International Stabilisation Force (ISF) could not bring calm at first. From 13 September, there was a new United Nations police mission. The UN mission (UNMIT) began to ensure peace and order with up to 1,600 police officers. The majority of Dili's inhabitants had to seek refuge in refugee camps and churches. At times, 100,000 people were living in emergency government camps throughout the country. Finally, the government stopped food aid for the refugees and offered each returning family 1,500 to 4,500 US dollars. Slowly, the number of refugees decreased. Since the end of 2007, the electricity supply to the capital functioned relatively smoothly again. At the end of December 2012, the mandates of UNMIT and ISF ended. The last foreign soldiers and police officers left.

In February 2008, Timor-Leste's national police took over responsibility for security in the capital for the first time. Just days later, rebel chief Alfredo Reinado led some of his men to Dili. A firefight broke out in President José Ramos-Horta's home, killing Reinado and another rebel and seriously injuring the President and one of his bodyguards. Shortly thereafter, rebels also attacked the home and motorcade of Prime Minister Xanana Gusmão, who escaped unharmed. A state of emergency was declared and 1,000 police officers and soldiers searched the city and the surrounding area for the perpetrators.

After the parliamentary elections in 2012, violent riots broke out in various outskirts of Dili. In Hera, a student and Fretilin supporter was shot dead by a police officer. 15 other people, including four police officers, were injured. 60 cars and seven houses were destroyed. Police arrested 16 people when they damaged the An-nur Mosque, Timor-Leste's largest mosque. The police regained control of the situation by morning.

On November 18, 2018, a drunk off-duty police officer shot dead three young men in the Culuhun tragedy. The incident sparked widespread outrage and protests, as police officers are only allowed to carry weapons on duty. The gunman and three other officers involved were arrested.

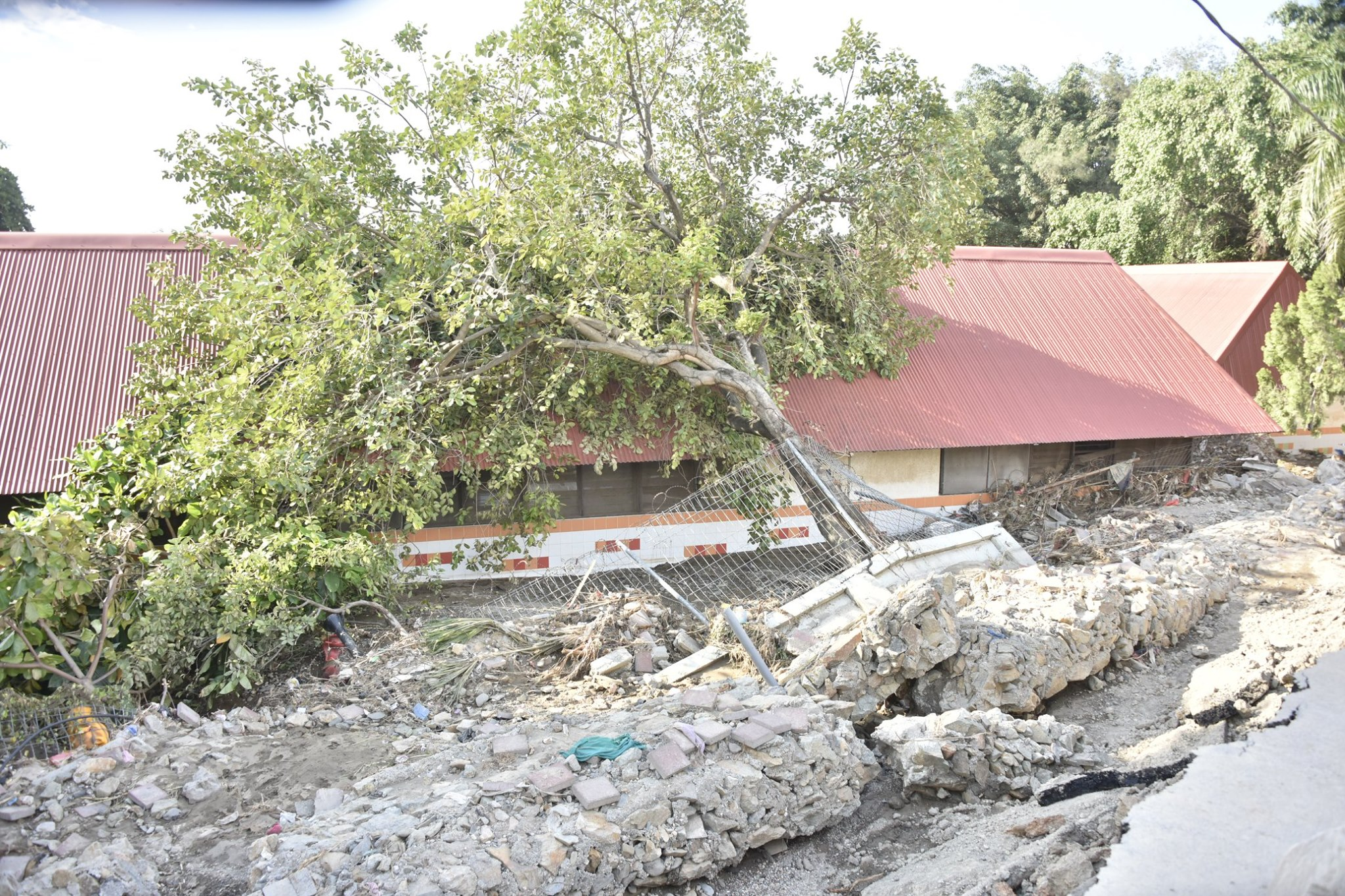
Flood in Dili (March 2021)

On March 13, 2020, severe flooding hit central and eastern Dili, including the Presidential Palace of Timor-Leste. There was damage in Becora, Becusi, Bidau, Bemori, Caicoli and Maloa. Three people were injured, two people died. 200 residents became homeless and had to seek refuge in emergency shelters. In the Escola Portuguesa Ruy Cinatti, teachers and hundreds of students had to flee from the water to the first floor. At the few months old park at the Ponte B.J. Habibie, the bank reinforcement collapsed.

On the night of July 29, 2021, a major fire destroyed 400 houses in the Lurumata district, on the site of the former Comoro market. In December, after heavy rains, there were again major floods.

On January 1, 2022, Atauro was separated from Dili as a separate municipality.

== See also ==
- History of Timor-Leste
- Timeline of East Timorese history
- Chinese people in Timor-Leste
- List of colonial governors of Portuguese Timor
- East Timorese rebellion of 1911–1912

== Literature ==
- Monika Schlicher: Portugal in Osttimor. Eine kritische Untersuchung zur portugiesischen Kolonialgeschichte in Osttimor 1850 bis 1912. (Abera Network Asia-Pacific 4). Abera, Hamburg 1996, ISBN 3-931567-08-7. (Zugleich: Heidelberg, Univ., Diss, 1994)
