= António de Albuquerque Coelho =

Portuguese politician (1682-1745)

Governor of Macau
- In office 30 May 1718 – 9 September 1719
- Preceded by: Francisco de Alarcão Sotto-Maior
- Succeeded by: António da Silva Telo e Meneses

Colonial governor of Portuguese Timor
- In office 1722–1725
- Preceded by: Manuel de Santo António
- Succeeded by: António Moniz de Macedo

Personal details
- Born: 1682 Santa Cruz de Macuttá, Maranhão, State of Brazil
- Died: 1745 (aged 62–63) Madre de Deus, Portuguese India

António de Albuquerque Coelho (c. 1682–1745) was the Governor of Macau from 1718 to 1719. In 1722, he was appointed colonial governor of Portuguese Timor.

== Early life ==
He was born in the province of Maranhão, State of Brazil, a Portuguese possession. He was the illegitimate son of Antonio de Albuquerque Coelho de Carvalho (1655–1725), the first governor of the Captaincy of São Paulo and Minas de Ouro, and his mulatto mistress, Angela de Bairros. His father sent him to Portugal for his education.

== Career ==
Afterward, he sailed to India as a solder, departing Lisbon on 25 March 1700 aboard the ship São Pedro Gonçalves and reaching Goa on 12 September. He was soon commissioned and served for eight years in the Terço or Regiment of Goa.

In the spring of 1708, he sailed on the frigate Nossa Senhora das Neves to Macau as the captain of the marines aboard; during the voyage the ship was heavily damaged—"complete dismasted, without rudder, or even the beakhead"—by a severe typhoon in the South China Sea and had to be towed into Macau's harbor, arriving on 23 August.

There he fell in love with an 18-year-old (9 according to another source) orphan named Maria de Moura (or her great wealth), over the objections of her grandmother and guardian, as well as romantic rivals. He remained in Macau rather than returning to Goa. On 2 August 1709, one of those rivals had slaves fire at him on several occasions, armed with blunderbusses; only the last managed to hit him, striking him in the right arm. His arm had to be amputated due to the onset of gangrene, but he recovered, and the couple married 22 August 1710; another rival tried to kill him beforehand, but went to the wrong church. The couple had two children, a girl who died a week after she was born, and a son on 20 June 1714, but Maria died of septicemia a few weeks later.

He became an alderman in 1712. He made enemies, among them the chief magistrate, Manoel Vicente Roza, who had him imprisoned, though not for long. He returned to Goa in early 1716 in disgrace. Yet somehow, within a year, he was named Governor and Captain-General of Macau.

Francisco Xavier Doutel, yet another enemy and the captain of the ship on which he was to travel to Macau, tried to sabotage his appointment by sailing without him on the night of 22 May 1717. No other vessel was ready to sail before the monsoon season began. Undeterred, he set out overland with a small retinue, making a dangerous journey across the Indian subcontinent to Madras, arriving on 19 July. With no ship available, one was purchased and outfitted. He sailed on 5 August, reaching Johore two months later.

While wintering in Johore, he became embroiled in a coup, backing first the losing side, then the winning usurper, then negotiated a treating granting the Portuguese land on which to build a church and permission to send Catholic missionaries.

Resuming his journey in mid-April 1718, he finally reached Macau on 30 May. His year-long journey was recorded in a book, Journal that the Senhor Antonio de Albuquerque Coelho, Governor and Captain-General of the City of the Name of God of Macao in China. Made From Goa until reaching the said City, published sometime between 1718 and 1720.

By all accounts, his governorship was successful, but it came to an end in 1719, cutting short his three-year term. He returned to Goa, departing in January 1720 aboard the frigate Nossa Senhora das Brotas and arriving on 20 May.

In January 1722, Viceroy Francisco José de Sampaio e Castro appointed him Governor and Captain-General of Timor and Solor, hoping he would be able to rein in the difficult Bishop of Malacca, Manoel de Santa Antonio. Albuquerque traveled to his new post via Macau. The two men clashed, and the governor eventually had the bishop arrested and deported to Macau in July 1722. A native rebellion broke out, possibly instigated by the bishop, and he was besieged by Topasses during his three years of service there. He held out and handed over his office to his successor, returning once again to Goa, by way of Macau.

In 1726, Albuquerque was named Governor and Captain-General of Patta, an island off the East African coast halfway between Mombassa and Kismayo. However, he did not get along with Alvaro Caetano de Mello e Castro, Governor of Mombassa. Their lack of cooperation forced Albuquerque to abandon the island after only six months, while Mombassa was lost to the Arabs in December 1729. In Goa, he was tried for failing to provide aid to Mombassa, but was acquitted.

He entered in the Franciscan convent in Goa and resided there for the remainder of his life.
