= Mário Lemos Pires =

20th-century Portuguese officer and governor of East Timor

Major-general Mário Lemos Pires CvA
- Pires, c. 1991

Governor of Portuguese Timor
- In office 8 November 1974 – 27 November 1975
- President: Francisco da Costa Gomes
- Preceded by: Fernando Alves Aldeia
- Succeeded by: Francisco Xavier do Amaral (as President of East Timor)

Personal details
- Born: 30 June 1930 Lamego, Portugal
- Died: 22 May 2009 (aged 78) Lisbon, Portugal
- Education: Portuguese Military Academy
- Awards: Order of Aviz (Knight)

Military service
- Allegiance: Portugal
- Branch/service: Portuguese Army
- Years of service: 1948–1985
- Rank: Major-general
- Battles/wars: Portuguese Colonial War; Angolan War of Independence Guinea-Bissau War of Independence

Mário Lemos Pires CvA (30 June 1930 – 22 May 2009) was a major-general of the Portuguese Army and the last colonial governor of Portuguese Timor.

== Biography ==
Born in Lamego, Portugal in 1930, Lemos Pires moved to Lisbon at age 18 to commence his studies at the Portuguese Military Academy. Following his graduation as an officer, he took up various overseas postings in the Portuguese Overseas Empire. In the 1960s, Lemos Pires was posted to Algeria (then a French colony), where he studied French military counter-guerrilla techniques.

After Algeria he was posted as part of the 114th Battalion to Portuguese Angola, which was in the midst of a conflict for independence, and where he took part in the early stages of the early colonial war. By the late 1960s, he was posted back to Portugal, where he administered physical education programs for the army, but was soon sent to Portuguese Guinea, under the command of Military Governor António de Spínola, raising to the rank of colonel.

== Governor of Portuguese Timor ==
Pires in his military uniform

On 14 November 1974, Lemos Pires was appointed by the new Portuguese government (following the Carnation Revolution) as governor and commander-in-chief of the overseas province of Portuguese Timor. Posted to what was thought to be one of the more peaceful Portuguese territories, Lemos Pires found himself in the middle of a brewing conflict in Timor, while charged by the government to prepare Timor for independence. One of his first decrees made upon his arrival in Dili was to legalise political parties in preparation for elections to a Constituent Assembly in 1976.

In August 1975, one of those political parties, the Timorese Democratic Union (UDT), staged a coup against the Portuguese administration, prompting the outbreak of a three-month civil war, with many UDT politicians and supporters fleeing across the border to West Timor in Indonesia, where they were required to sign a petition calling for East Timor's incorporation into Indonesia. As a result of the conflict, Lemos Pires ordered the withdrawal of the Portuguese administration to the island of Atauro, off Dili. With opinion at home becoming increasingly detached from political developments in Timor, and more concerned with decolonisation in its African colonies of Angola and Mozambique than with Timor, Lemos Pires' attempts to broker an agreement between the UDT and the other prominent Timorese party, FRETILIN, were undermined, even while he insisted that he was awaiting instructions from the government in Lisbon.

Without any possibility of support from Portugal, Lemos Pires maintained his administration for three months until he ordered a withdrawal of staff and left his post for Lisbon on 27 November 1975. Less than two weeks later, on 7 December, Indonesia invaded East Timor, leading to a situation of Indonesian occupation that would last until 1999. At the 2003 Truth and Reconciliation Commission hearings held by East Timor, Lemos Pires explained his position at the time, as well as to why Portugal had failed to support Timor during the invasion: "We were so much more worried about what happened in Portugal than what happened in Timor. For example, they couldn't dispense forces - in good condition and with goodwill - to go to Timor to ensure security there. At the same time, for instance, we had no ambassador in Jakarta - and that was a very important post for us. And the political credibility of Portugal at that time was so low. Of course, if Portugal was prepared and had the force and political respect at that moment, we could have done better. The problem was that I became alone in that moment. Portugal forgot East Timor because on the one hand it was the revolution, on the other it was African decolonisation, and so many Portuguese there in such bad conditions."

== Later life ==
On his return to Lisbon, Pires was appointed commander of the Training Center for Special Operations and lectured at the Institute for Advanced Military Studies, of which he was deputy director. Later rising to be chief of staff of the Ministry of National Defense and the director of the National Defence College. In 1982, he was promoted to major-general and ended his military career as secretary general of the study center EuroDefense-Portugal.

After his military career, he was vice president of the Fraternal Aid to Mozambique and published a book about his experiences in Timor entitled Decolonization of Timor: Mission Impossible?

== Honours and awards ==
During his career, Pires received 21 honours and 14 military medals, including the following:

Ribbon	Award	Date awarded
	Military Order of Aviz (CvA)	1970
	Silver Distinguished Service Medal with Palms (MPSD) (Angola)	1963
	Silver Distinguished Service Medal (MPSD) (Guinea)	1971
	Silver Distinguished Service Medal (MPSD) (Professor at IAEM)	1975
	Gold Distinguished Service Medal (MOSD) (Director of the Army Physical Education Service)	1984
	Silver Distinguished Service Medal (MPSD) (Deputy Director of IAEM)	1987
	Silver Distinguished Service Medal (MPSD) (services provided at IDN)	1995
	Order of the Colonial Empire (CvIC) (civil services provided in Guinea)	1973
	Army Commendation Medal (United States) (performance in the General Staff Course)	1974

Government offices
Preceded by Níveo Herdade	Governor of Portuguese Timor; 1974 – 1975	Succeeded by Francisco Xavier do Amaral as President of East Timor
