= List of colonial governors of Portuguese Timor =

Governor of Portuguese Timor
- Portuguese: Governador do Timor Português
- Coat of arms of Portuguese Timor (1935–1975)
- Residence: Palácio de Lahane
- Nominator: Prime Minister of Portugal
- Appointer: Monarch of Portugal (1647–1910); President of Portugal (1910–1975)
- Precursor: None
- Formation: 1647
- First holder: António de São Jacinto
- Final holder: Mário Lemos Pires
- Abolished: 1975

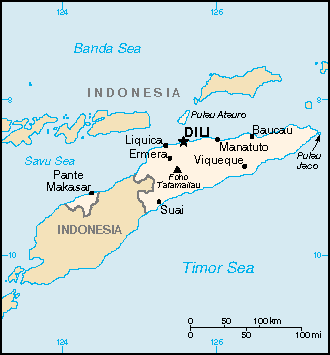
Map of East Timor.

This is a list of European (as well as Australian and Japanese) colonial administrators responsible for the territory of Portuguese Timor, an area equivalent to modern-day East Timor.

== List ==
(Dates in italics indicate de facto continuation of office)

Portuguese Timor (Timor Português)
No.	Portrait	Incumbent	Tenure		Notes	Head(s) of state (Reign / Term)
No.	Portrait	Incumbent	From	Until	Notes	Head(s) of state (Reign / Term)
Portuguese suzerainty
Subordinated to Portuguese India
1		António de São Jacinto; Captain	1647	1649	In Cupão	John IV; João IV; House of Braganza (1647 – 6 November 1656)
2		Francisco Carneiro; Captain	1649	1652	In Cupão	John IV; João IV; House of Braganza (1647 – 6 November 1656)
3		... Captain	1652	1662		John IV; João IV; House of Braganza (1647 – 6 November 1656)
3		... Captain	1652	1662		Alphonso VI; Afonso VI; House of Braganza (6 November 1656 – 12 September 1683)
4		Simão Luís; Captain	1662	1664		Alphonso VI; Afonso VI; House of Braganza (6 November 1656 – 12 September 1683)
5		Simão Luís; Captain-Major	1665	1666		Alphonso VI; Afonso VI; House of Braganza (6 November 1656 – 12 September 1683)
6		António Hornay; Captain-Major^{Ad Interim}	1666	1669	1st time	Alphonso VI; Afonso VI; House of Braganza (6 November 1656 – 12 September 1683)
7		Fernão Martins da Ponte; Captain-Major^{Ad Interim}	1669	1670		Alphonso VI; Afonso VI; House of Braganza (6 November 1656 – 12 September 1683)
8		Mateus da Costa; Captain-Major^{Ad Interim}	1671	1673		Alphonso VI; Afonso VI; House of Braganza (6 November 1656 – 12 September 1683)
9		António Hornay; Captain-Major^{Ad Interim}	1673	1680	2nd time	Alphonso VI; Afonso VI; House of Braganza (6 November 1656 – 12 September 1683)
10		João Antunes Portugal; Captain-Major	1680	1680	Sent by the Kingdom of Portugal but refused by settlers	Alphonso VI; Afonso VI; House of Braganza (6 November 1656 – 12 September 1683)
11		António Hornay; Captain-Major^{Ad Interim}	1680	1693	3rd time	Alphonso VI; Afonso VI; House of Braganza (6 November 1656 – 12 September 1683)
11		António Hornay; Captain-Major^{Ad Interim}	1680	1693	3rd time	Peter II; Pedro II; House of Braganza (6 November 1683 – 9 December 1706)
12		Francisco Hornay; Captain-Major^{Ad Interim}	1694	1696		Peter II; Pedro II; House of Braganza (6 November 1683 – 9 December 1706)
13		António de Mesquita Pimentel; Captain-Major	1696	1697		Peter II; Pedro II; House of Braganza (6 November 1683 – 9 December 1706)
14		André Coelho Vieira; Captain-Major	1697	1697		Peter II; Pedro II; House of Braganza (6 November 1683 – 9 December 1706)
15		Domingos da Costa; Captain-Major^{Ad Interim}	1697	1702		Peter II; Pedro II; House of Braganza (6 November 1683 – 9 December 1706)
16		António Coelho Guerreiro; Governor	20 February 1702	1705		Peter II; Pedro II; House of Braganza (6 November 1683 – 9 December 1706)
17		Lourenço Lopes; Governor	1705	1706		Peter II; Pedro II; House of Braganza (6 November 1683 – 9 December 1706)
18		Manuel Ferreira de Almeida; Governor	1706	1708	1st time	John V João V House of Braganza (9 December 1706 – 31 July 1750)
19		Jácome de Morais Sarmento; Governor	1708	1709		John V João V House of Braganza (9 December 1706 – 31 July 1750)
20		Manuel de Souto-Maior; Governor	1709	1714		John V João V House of Braganza (9 December 1706 – 31 July 1750)
21		Manuel Ferreira de Almeida; Governor	1714	1714	2nd time	John V João V House of Braganza (9 December 1706 – 31 July 1750)
22		Domingos da Costa; Governor	1714	1718		John V João V House of Braganza (9 December 1706 – 31 July 1750)
23		Francisco de Melo e Castro; Governor	1718	1719		John V João V House of Braganza (9 December 1706 – 31 July 1750)
24		Manuel de Santo António; Governor	1719	1722		John V João V House of Braganza (9 December 1706 – 31 July 1750)
25		António de Albuquerque Coelho; Governor	1722	1725		John V João V House of Braganza (9 December 1706 – 31 July 1750)
26		António Moniz de Macedo; Governor	1725	1729	1st time	John V João V House of Braganza (9 December 1706 – 31 July 1750)
27		Pedro de Melo; Governor	1729	1731		John V João V House of Braganza (9 December 1706 – 31 July 1750)
28		Pedro do Rego Barreto da Gama e Castro; Governor	1731	1734		John V João V House of Braganza (9 December 1706 – 31 July 1750)
29		António Moniz de Macedo; Governor	1734	1739	2nd time	John V João V House of Braganza (9 December 1706 – 31 July 1750)
30		... Governor^{Ad Interim}	1739	1741		John V João V House of Braganza (9 December 1706 – 31 July 1750)
31		Manuel Leonís de Castro; Governor	1741	1745		John V João V House of Braganza (9 December 1706 – 31 July 1750)
32		Francisco Xavier Moraes Doutel; Governor	1745	1748		John V João V House of Braganza (9 December 1706 – 31 July 1750)
33		Manuel Correia de Lacerda; Governor	1748	1751		John V João V House of Braganza (9 December 1706 – 31 July 1750)
33		Manuel Correia de Lacerda; Governor	1748	1751		Joseph I José I House of Braganza (31 July 1750 – 24 February 1777)
34		Manuel Doutel de Figueiredo Sarmento; Governor	1751	1759		Joseph I José I House of Braganza (31 July 1750 – 24 February 1777)
35		Sebastião de Azevedo e Brito; Governor	1759	1760		Joseph I José I House of Braganza (31 July 1750 – 24 February 1777)
36		... Governor^{Ad Interim}	1760	1763		Joseph I José I House of Braganza (31 July 1750 – 24 February 1777)
37		Dionísio Gonçalves Rebelo Galvão; Governor	1763	1765		Joseph I José I House of Braganza (31 July 1750 – 24 February 1777)
38		... Governor^{Ad Interim}	1765	1768		Joseph I José I House of Braganza (31 July 1750 – 24 February 1777)
39		António José Teles de Meneses; Governor	1768	1776		Joseph I José I House of Braganza (31 July 1750 – 24 February 1777)
40		Caetano de Lemos Telo de Meneses; Governor	1776	1779		Joseph I José I House of Braganza (31 July 1750 – 24 February 1777)
40		Caetano de Lemos Telo de Meneses; Governor	1776	1779		Mary I Maria I House of Braganza (24 February 1777 – 20 March 1816) & Peter III; Pedro III; House of Braganza (24 February 1777 – 25 May 1786)
41		Lourenço de Brito Correia; Governor	1779	1782		Mary I Maria I House of Braganza (24 February 1777 – 20 March 1816) & Peter III; Pedro III; House of Braganza (24 February 1777 – 25 May 1786)
42		João Anselmo de Almeida Soares; Governor	1782	1785		Mary I Maria I House of Braganza (24 February 1777 – 20 March 1816) & Peter III; Pedro III; House of Braganza (24 February 1777 – 25 May 1786)
43		João Baptista Vieira Godinho; Governor	1785	1788		Mary I Maria I House of Braganza (24 February 1777 – 20 March 1816) & Peter III; Pedro III; House of Braganza (24 February 1777 – 25 May 1786)
44		Feliciano António Nogueira Lisboa; Governor	1788	1790		Mary I Maria I House of Braganza (24 February 1777 – 20 March 1816) & Peter III; Pedro III; House of Braganza (24 February 1777 – 25 May 1786)
45		Joaquim Xavier de Morias Sarmento; Governor	1790	1794		Mary I Maria I House of Braganza (24 February 1777 – 20 March 1816) & Peter III; Pedro III; House of Braganza (24 February 1777 – 25 May 1786)
46		João Baptista Verquaim; Governor	1794	1800		Mary I Maria I House of Braganza (24 February 1777 – 20 March 1816) & Peter III; Pedro III; House of Braganza (24 February 1777 – 25 May 1786)
47		José Joaquim de Sousa; Governor	1800	1804		Mary I Maria I House of Braganza (24 February 1777 – 20 March 1816) & Peter III; Pedro III; House of Braganza (24 February 1777 – 25 May 1786)
48		João Vicente Soares da Veiga; Governor	1804	1807		Mary I Maria I House of Braganza (24 February 1777 – 20 March 1816) & Peter III; Pedro III; House of Braganza (24 February 1777 – 25 May 1786)
49		António de Mendonça Côrte-Real; Governor	1807	1810		Mary I Maria I House of Braganza (24 February 1777 – 20 March 1816) & Peter III; Pedro III; House of Braganza (24 February 1777 – 25 May 1786)
50		António Botelho Homem Bernardes Pessõa; Governor	1810	1810		Mary I Maria I House of Braganza (24 February 1777 – 20 March 1816) & Peter III; Pedro III; House of Braganza (24 February 1777 – 25 May 1786)
51		Joaquim António Duarte da Silva Veloso; Governor	1810	1812		Mary I Maria I House of Braganza (24 February 1777 – 20 March 1816) & Peter III; Pedro III; House of Braganza (24 February 1777 – 25 May 1786)
52		Vitorino Freire da Cunha Gusmão; Governor	1812	1815		Mary I Maria I House of Braganza (24 February 1777 – 20 March 1816) & Peter III; Pedro III; House of Braganza (24 February 1777 – 25 May 1786)
53		José Pinto Alcoforado de Azevedo e Sousa; Governor	1815	1819		Mary I Maria I House of Braganza (24 February 1777 – 20 March 1816) & Peter III; Pedro III; House of Braganza (24 February 1777 – 25 May 1786)
53		José Pinto Alcoforado de Azevedo e Sousa; Governor	1815	1819		John VI; João VI; House of Braganza (20 March 1816 – 10 March 1826)
54		Gregório Rodrigues Pereira; Governor	1819	1821		John VI; João VI; House of Braganza (20 March 1816 – 10 March 1826)
55		Manuel Joaquim de Matos e Góis; Governor	1821	1832		John VI; João VI; House of Braganza (20 March 1816 – 10 March 1826)
55		Manuel Joaquim de Matos e Góis; Governor	1821	1832		Peter IV; Pedro IV; House of Braganza (10 March 1826 – 2 May 1826)
55		Manuel Joaquim de Matos e Góis; Governor	1821	1832		Mary II; Maria II; House of Braganza (2 May 1826 – 23 June 1828)
55		Manuel Joaquim de Matos e Góis; Governor	1821	1832		Michael I Miguel I House of Braganza (26 February 1828 – 6 May 1834)
56		Miguel da Silveira Lorena; Governor	1832	1832		Michael I Miguel I House of Braganza (26 February 1828 – 6 May 1834)
57		Miguel Carlos da Cunha da Silveira e Lorena; Governor	1832	1834		Michael I Miguel I House of Braganza (26 February 1828 – 6 May 1834)
58		José Maria Marques; Governor	1834	1839		Mary II; Maria II; House of Braganza (26 May 1834 – 15 November 1853) & Ferdinand II; Fernando II; House of Saxe-Coburg-Gotha-Koháry (16 September 1837 – 15 November 1853)
59		Frederico Leão Cabreira de Brito Alvelos Drago Valente; Governor	1839	1844		Mary II; Maria II; House of Braganza (26 May 1834 – 15 November 1853) & Ferdinand II; Fernando II; House of Saxe-Coburg-Gotha-Koháry (16 September 1837 – 15 November 1853)
Subordinated to Portuguese Macau						Mary II; Maria II; House of Braganza (26 May 1834 – 15 November 1853) & Ferdinand II; Fernando II; House of Saxe-Coburg-Gotha-Koháry (16 September 1837 – 15 November 1853)
60		Julião José da Silva Vieiras; Governor	1844	1848		Mary II; Maria II; House of Braganza (26 May 1834 – 15 November 1853) & Ferdinand II; Fernando II; House of Saxe-Coburg-Gotha-Koháry (16 September 1837 – 15 November 1853)
61		António Olavo Monteiro Torres; Governor	1848	30 October 1850		Mary II; Maria II; House of Braganza (26 May 1834 – 15 November 1853) & Ferdinand II; Fernando II; House of Saxe-Coburg-Gotha-Koháry (16 September 1837 – 15 November 1853)
Separate colony						Mary II; Maria II; House of Braganza (26 May 1834 – 15 November 1853) & Ferdinand II; Fernando II; House of Saxe-Coburg-Gotha-Koháry (16 September 1837 – 15 November 1853)
62		António Olavo Monteiro Torres; Governor	30 October 1850	1851		Mary II; Maria II; House of Braganza (26 May 1834 – 15 November 1853) & Ferdinand II; Fernando II; House of Saxe-Coburg-Gotha-Koháry (16 September 1837 – 15 November 1853)
63		José Joaquim Lopes de Lima; Governor	23 June 1851	15 September 1851		Mary II; Maria II; House of Braganza (26 May 1834 – 15 November 1853) & Ferdinand II; Fernando II; House of Saxe-Coburg-Gotha-Koháry (16 September 1837 – 15 November 1853)
Subordinated to Portuguese Macau						Mary II; Maria II; House of Braganza (26 May 1834 – 15 November 1853) & Ferdinand II; Fernando II; House of Saxe-Coburg-Gotha-Koháry (16 September 1837 – 15 November 1853)
64		José Joaquim Lopes de Lima; Governor	15 September 1851	8 September 1852	Died in office	Mary II; Maria II; House of Braganza (26 May 1834 – 15 November 1853) & Ferdinand II; Fernando II; House of Saxe-Coburg-Gotha-Koháry (16 September 1837 – 15 November 1853)
65		Manuel de Saldanha da Gama; Governor	1852	1856		Mary II; Maria II; House of Braganza (26 May 1834 – 15 November 1853) & Ferdinand II; Fernando II; House of Saxe-Coburg-Gotha-Koháry (16 September 1837 – 15 November 1853)
65		Manuel de Saldanha da Gama; Governor	1852	1856		Peter V Pedro V House of Braganza (15 November 1853 – 11 November 1861)
Subordinated to Portuguese India						Peter V Pedro V House of Braganza (15 November 1853 – 11 November 1861)
66		Luís Augusto de Almeida Macedo; Governor	1856	1859		Peter V Pedro V House of Braganza (15 November 1853 – 11 November 1861)
67		Afonso de Castro; Governor	1859	1863		Peter V Pedro V House of Braganza (15 November 1853 – 11 November 1861)
67		Afonso de Castro; Governor	1859	1863		Louis I Luís I House of Braganza (11 November 1861 – 19 October 1889)
Separate overseas province						Louis I Luís I House of Braganza (11 November 1861 – 19 October 1889)
68		José Manuel Pereira de Almeida; Governor	1863	1864		Louis I Luís I House of Braganza (11 November 1861 – 19 October 1889)
69		José Eduardo da Costa Meneses; Governor	1864	1866		Louis I Luís I House of Braganza (11 November 1861 – 19 October 1889)
Subordinated to Portuguese Macau						Louis I Luís I House of Braganza (11 November 1861 – 19 October 1889)
70		Francisco Teixeira da Silva; Governor	1866	1869		Louis I Luís I House of Braganza (11 November 1861 – 19 October 1889)
70		António Joaquim Garcia; Governor	1866	1869		Louis I Luís I House of Braganza (11 November 1861 – 19 October 1889)
71		Pedro Carlos de Aguiar Craveiro Lopes; Governor	1870	1870	Did not take office	Louis I Luís I House of Braganza (11 November 1861 – 19 October 1889)
72		João Clímaco de Carvalho; Governor	1870	1871		Louis I Luís I House of Braganza (11 November 1861 – 19 October 1889)
72		Manuel de Castro Sampaio; Governor	1870	1871		Louis I Luís I House of Braganza (11 November 1861 – 19 October 1889)
73		Hugo Goodair de Lacerda Castelo Branco; Governor	1873	1876	1st time	Louis I Luís I House of Braganza (11 November 1861 – 19 October 1889)
74		Joaquim António da Silva Ferrão; Governor	1876	1878		Louis I Luís I House of Braganza (11 November 1861 – 19 October 1889)
74		José Alves da Costa; Governor	1876	1878		Louis I Luís I House of Braganza (11 November 1861 – 19 October 1889)
75		Hugo Goodair de Lacerda Castelo Branco; Governor	1878	1880	2nd time	Louis I Luís I House of Braganza (11 November 1861 – 19 October 1889)
76		Augusto César Cardoso de Carvalho; Governor	1880	1881		Louis I Luís I House of Braganza (11 November 1861 – 19 October 1889)
76		José dos Santos Vaquinhas; Governor	1880	1881		Louis I Luís I House of Braganza (11 November 1861 – 19 October 1889)
77		Bento da França Pinto de Oliveira; Governor	1882	1883		Louis I Luís I House of Braganza (11 November 1861 – 19 October 1889)
77		Porfírio Zeferino de Sousa Governor	1882	1883	1st time	Louis I Luís I House of Braganza (11 November 1861 – 19 October 1889)
77		Francisco de Paula da Lua; Governor	1882	1883		Louis I Luís I House of Braganza (11 November 1861 – 19 October 1889)
78		João Maria Pereira; Governor	1883	1885		Louis I Luís I House of Braganza (11 November 1861 – 19 October 1889)
78		Cipriano Forjaz; Governor	1883	1885	1st time	Louis I Luís I House of Braganza (11 November 1861 – 19 October 1889)
79		Alfredo de Lacerda Maia; Governor	1885	3 March 1887		Louis I Luís I House of Braganza (11 November 1861 – 19 October 1889)
80		António Joaquim Garcia; Governor	1887	1887		Louis I Luís I House of Braganza (11 November 1861 – 19 October 1889)
81		António Francisco da Costa; Governor	1887	1888		Louis I Luís I House of Braganza (11 November 1861 – 19 October 1889)
82		Rafael Jácome Lopes de Andrade; Governor	1888	1889		Louis I Luís I House of Braganza (11 November 1861 – 19 October 1889)
83		Porfírio Zeferino de Sousa; Governor	1889	1890	2nd time	Charles I Carlos; House of Braganza (19 October 1889 – 1 February 1908)
84		Cipriano Forjaz; Governor	1890	1894	2nd time	Charles I Carlos; House of Braganza (19 October 1889 – 1 February 1908)
85		Porfírio Zeferino de Sousa; Governor	1894	1894	3rd time	Charles I Carlos; House of Braganza (19 October 1889 – 1 February 1908)
86		José Celestino da Silva; Governor	1894	15 October 1896		Charles I Carlos; House of Braganza (19 October 1889 – 1 February 1908)
Separate colony						Charles I Carlos; House of Braganza (19 October 1889 – 1 February 1908)
87		José Celestino da Silva; Governor	15 October 1896	1908		Charles I Carlos; House of Braganza (19 October 1889 – 1 February 1908)
88		Jaime Augusto Vieira da Rocha; Governor^{Ad Interim}	1908	1908		Charles I Carlos; House of Braganza (19 October 1889 – 1 February 1908)
88		Jaime Augusto Vieira da Rocha; Governor^{Ad Interim}	1908	1908		Emmanuel II; Manuel II; House of Braganza (1 February 1908 – 5 October 1910)
89		Eduardo Augusto Marquês; Governor	1908	1909		Emmanuel II; Manuel II; House of Braganza (1 February 1908 – 5 October 1910)
90		Gonçalo Pereira Pimenta de Castro; Governor	1909	1910	1st time	Emmanuel II; Manuel II; House of Braganza (1 February 1908 – 5 October 1910)
91		Alfredo Cardoso de Soveral Martins; Governor	1910	30 October 1910		Emmanuel II; Manuel II; House of Braganza (1 February 1908 – 5 October 1910)
91		Alfredo Cardoso de Soveral Martins; Governor	1910	30 October 1910		Teófilo Braga; Provisional President of the First Portuguese Republic (5 October 1910 – 24 August 1911)
92		Anselmo Augusto Coelho de Carvalho; Governor^{Ad Interim}	1910	1910		Teófilo Braga; Provisional President of the First Portuguese Republic (5 October 1910 – 24 August 1911)
93		José Carrazeda Caldas Viana e Andrade; Governor^{Ad Interim}	1910	1910		Teófilo Braga; Provisional President of the First Portuguese Republic (5 October 1910 – 24 August 1911)
94		Filomeno da Câmara Melo Cabral; Governor	1911	1913	1st time; served during the East Timorese rebellion of 1911–12	Teófilo Braga; Provisional President of the First Portuguese Republic (5 October 1910 – 24 August 1911)
94		Filomeno da Câmara Melo Cabral; Governor	1911	1913	1st time; served during the East Timorese rebellion of 1911–12	Manuel de Arriaga; President of the First Portuguese Republic (24 August 1911 – 26 May 1915)
95		Gonçalo Pereira Pimenta de Castro; Governor^{Ad Interim}	1913	1914	2nd time	Manuel de Arriaga; President of the First Portuguese Republic (24 August 1911 – 26 May 1915)
96		Filomeno da Cámara Melo Cabral; Governor	1914	1917	2nd time	Manuel de Arriaga; President of the First Portuguese Republic (24 August 1911 – 26 May 1915)
96		Filomeno da Cámara Melo Cabral; Governor	1914	1917	2nd time	Teófilo Braga; President of the First Portuguese Republic (29 May 1915 – 5 October 1915)
96		Filomeno da Cámara Melo Cabral; Governor	1914	1917	2nd time	Bernardino Machado; President of the First Portuguese Republic (5 October 1915 – 5 December 1917)
97		César de Abreu; Governor^{Ad Interim}	1917	1917		Bernardino Machado; President of the First Portuguese Republic (5 October 1915 – 5 December 1917)
97		José Machado Duarte Júnior; Governor^{Ad Interim}	1917	1917		Bernardino Machado; President of the First Portuguese Republic (5 October 1915 – 5 December 1917)
98		Luís Augusto de Oliveira Franco; Governor^{Ad Interim}	1917	1919	1st time	Bernardino Machado; President of the First Portuguese Republic (5 October 1915 – 5 December 1917)
98		Luís Augusto de Oliveira Franco; Governor^{Ad Interim}	1917	1919	1st time	Sidónio Pais; President of the First Portuguese Republic (28 April 1918 – 14 December 1918)
98		Luís Augusto de Oliveira Franco; Governor^{Ad Interim}	1917	1919	1st time	João do Canto e Castro; President of the First Portuguese Republic (16 December 1918 – 5 October 1919)
99		Manuel Paulo de Sousa Gentil; Governor	1919	1920		João do Canto e Castro; President of the First Portuguese Republic (16 December 1918 – 5 October 1919)
99		Manuel Paulo de Sousa Gentil; Governor	1919	1920		António José de Almeida; President of the First Portuguese Republic (5 October 1919 – 5 October 1923)
100		Luís Augusto de Oliveira Franco; Governor^{Ad Interim}	1920	1921	2nd time	António José de Almeida; President of the First Portuguese Republic (5 October 1919 – 5 October 1923)
101		José de Paiva Gomes; Governor	1921	1921	1st time	António José de Almeida; President of the First Portuguese Republic (5 October 1919 – 5 October 1923)
102		Humberto dos Santos Leitão; Governor^{Ad Interim}	1921	1921	1st time	António José de Almeida; President of the First Portuguese Republic (5 October 1919 – 5 October 1923)
103		José de Paiva Gomes; Governor	1921	1923	2nd time	António José de Almeida; President of the First Portuguese Republic (5 October 1919 – 5 October 1923)
103		José de Paiva Gomes; Governor	1921	1923	2nd time	Manuel Teixeira Gomes; President of the First Portuguese Republic (5 October 1923 – 11 December 1925)
104		Humberto dos Santos Leitão; Governor^{Ad Interim}	1923	1924	2nd time	Manuel Teixeira Gomes; President of the First Portuguese Republic (5 October 1923 – 11 December 1925)
105		Raimundo Enes Meira; Governor	1924	1926		Manuel Teixeira Gomes; President of the First Portuguese Republic (5 October 1923 – 11 December 1925)
105		Raimundo Enes Meira; Governor	1924	1926		Bernardino Machado; President of the First Portuguese Republic (11 December 1925 – 31 May 1926)
106		Teófilo Duarte; Governor	1926	1929		Bernardino Machado; President of the First Portuguese Republic (11 December 1925 – 31 May 1926)
106		Teófilo Duarte; Governor	1926	1929		José Mendes Cabeçadas; President of the Second Portuguese Republic (31 May 1926 – 17 June 1926)
106		Teófilo Duarte; Governor	1926	1929		Manuel Gomes da Costa; President of the Second Portuguese Republic (29 June 1926 – 9 July 1926)
106		Teófilo Duarte; Governor	1926	1929		Óscar Carmona; President of the Second Portuguese Republic (29 November 1926 – 18 April 1951)
107		Cesário Augusto de Almeida Viana; Governor	1929	1930		Óscar Carmona; President of the Second Portuguese Republic (29 November 1926 – 18 April 1951)
108		Abel Teixeira da Costa Tavares; Governor^{Ad Interim}	1930	1930		Óscar Carmona; President of the Second Portuguese Republic (29 November 1926 – 18 April 1951)
109		Antonio Baptista Justo; Governor	1930	1933		Óscar Carmona; President of the Second Portuguese Republic (29 November 1926 – 18 April 1951)
110		José Luís Fontoura de Sequeira; Governor^{Ad Interim}	1933	1933		Óscar Carmona; President of the Second Portuguese Republic (29 November 1926 – 18 April 1951)
111		Raúl de Antas Manso Preto Mendes Cruz; Governor	1933	1936		Óscar Carmona; President of the Second Portuguese Republic (29 November 1926 – 18 April 1951)
112		Eduardo Bernardo Lápido Loureiro; Governor^{Ad Interim}	1936	1936		Óscar Carmona; President of the Second Portuguese Republic (29 November 1926 – 18 April 1951)
113		Álvaro Eugénio Neves da Fontoura; Governor	1937	1940		Óscar Carmona; President of the Second Portuguese Republic (29 November 1926 – 18 April 1951)
114		António Jacinto Magro; Governor^{Ad Interim}	1940	1940		Óscar Carmona; President of the Second Portuguese Republic (29 November 1926 – 18 April 1951)
115		Manuel de Abreu Ferreira de Carvalho; Governor	1940	8 December 1945	Considered himself a prisoner during allied rule from December 1941 until February 1942; confined by Japanese from February 1942 until August 1945	Óscar Carmona; President of the Second Portuguese Republic (29 November 1926 – 18 April 1951)
Allied occupation of Portuguese Timor
116		William Leggatt; Commander of Australian forces	17 December 1941	20 February 1942		George VI; House of Windsor (11 December 1936 – 6 February 1952)
116		Nico Leonard Willem van Straten; Commander of Dutch forces	17 December 1941	20 February 1942		Wilhelmina; House of Orange-Nassau (23 November 1890 – 4 September 1948)
Japanese occupation of Portuguese Timor
117		Takeo Itō; Commander	20 February 1942	20 February 1942	Commanding officer of Japanese landing forces	Emperor Shōwa 昭和天皇 (1926 – 1989)
118		Sadashichi Doi; Commander	20 February 1942	August 1942		Emperor Shōwa 昭和天皇 (1926 – 1989)
119		Yuitsu Tsuchihashi; Commander	August 1942	22 November 1944		Emperor Shōwa 昭和天皇 (1926 – 1989)
120		Kunitaro Yamada; Commander	22 November 1944	11 September 1945		Emperor Shōwa 昭和天皇 (1926 – 1989)
Portuguese Timor
121		Manuel de Abreu Ferreira de Carvalho; Governor	1940	8 December 1945	Considered himself a prisoner during allied rule from December 1941 until February 1942; confined by Japanese from February 1942 until August 1945	Óscar Carmona; President of the Second Portuguese Republic (29 November 1926 – 18 April 1951)
122		Óscar Freire de Vasconcelos Ruas; Governor	1946	1950		Óscar Carmona; President of the Second Portuguese Republic (29 November 1926 – 18 April 1951)
123		César Maria de Serpa Rosa; Governor	1950	11 June 1950		Óscar Carmona; President of the Second Portuguese Republic (29 November 1926 – 18 April 1951)
Overseas province						Óscar Carmona; President of the Second Portuguese Republic (29 November 1926 – 18 April 1951)
		César Maria de Serpa Rosa; Governor	11 June 1950	1958		Óscar Carmona; President of the Second Portuguese Republic (29 November 1926 – 18 April 1951)
124		César Maria de Serpa Rosa; Governor	11 June 1950	1958		António de Oliveira Salazar; Acting President of the Second Portuguese Republic (18 April 1951 – 21 July 1951)
124		César Maria de Serpa Rosa; Governor	11 June 1950	1958		Francisco Craveiro Lopes; President of the Second Portuguese Republic (21 July 1951 – 9 August 1958)
125		Filipe José Freire Temudo Barata; Governor	1959	1963		Américo Tomás; President of the Second Portuguese Republic (9 August 1958 – 25 April 1974)
126		José Alberty Correia; Governor	1963	1968		Américo Tomás; President of the Second Portuguese Republic (9 August 1958 – 25 April 1974)
127		José Nogueira Valente Pires; Governor	1968	1972		Américo Tomás; President of the Second Portuguese Republic (9 August 1958 – 25 April 1974)
		Fernando Alves Adeía; Governor	1972	1974		Américo Tomás; President of the Second Portuguese Republic (9 August 1958 – 25 April 1974)
128		Fernando Alves Adeía; Governor	1972	1974		Américo Tomás; President of the Second Portuguese Republic (9 August 1958 – 25 April 1974)
128		Fernando Alves Adeía; Governor	1972	1974		National Salvation Junta (25 April 1974 – 15 May 1974)
128		Fernando Alves Adeía; Governor	1972	1974		António de Spínola; President of the Third Portuguese Republic (15 May 1974 – 30 September 1974)
128		Fernando Alves Adeía; Governor	1972	1974		Francisco da Costa Gomes; President of the Third Portuguese Republic (30 September 1974 – 13 July 1976)
129		Mário Lemos Pires; Governor	18 November 1974	27 November 1975	From 11 August 1975, on Atauro Island	Francisco da Costa Gomes; President of the Third Portuguese Republic (30 September 1974 – 13 July 1976)
Unilateral Declaration of Independence as Democratic Republic of East Timor
Invaded and occupied by Indonesia (from 17 July 1976, annexed as East Timor province). Not recognized by Portugal; remained recognized by United Nations as Portuguese territory.
130		Arnaldo dos Reis Araújo; Governor	3 August 1976	19 September 1978		Suharto; President of Indonesia (27 March 1968 – 21 May 1998) B. J. Habibie; President of Indonesia (21 May 1998 – 20 October 1999)
131		Guilherme Maria Gonçalves; Governor	19 September 1978	18 September 1982		Suharto; President of Indonesia (27 March 1968 – 21 May 1998) B. J. Habibie; President of Indonesia (21 May 1998 – 20 October 1999)
132		Mário Viegas Carrascalão; Governor	18 September 1982	18 September 1992		Suharto; President of Indonesia (27 March 1968 – 21 May 1998) B. J. Habibie; President of Indonesia (21 May 1998 – 20 October 1999)
133		José Abílio Osório Soares; Governor	18 September 1992	19 October 1999		Suharto; President of Indonesia (27 March 1968 – 21 May 1998) B. J. Habibie; President of Indonesia (21 May 1998 – 20 October 1999)
Referendum votes for independence 78%						Suharto; President of Indonesia (27 March 1968 – 21 May 1998) B. J. Habibie; President of Indonesia (21 May 1998 – 20 October 1999)
International Administration (from 28 February 2000, under UN Administration; United Nations Transitional Administration in East Timor [UNTAET]).
134		Sérgio Vieira de Mello; Transitional Administrator	25 October 1999	19 May 2002		Kofi Annan; Secretary-General of the United Nations (1 January 1997 – 31 December 2006)
Independence as Democratic Republic of East Timor

For continuation after independence, see: President of East Timor

== See also ==
- East Timor
  - History of East Timor
  - Politics of East Timor
  - President of East Timor
  - Prime Minister of East Timor
- List of colonial Residents of Dutch Timor
- List of rulers of Timor
- Lists of office-holders
