= Moradores =

Timorese militia under Portuguese rule

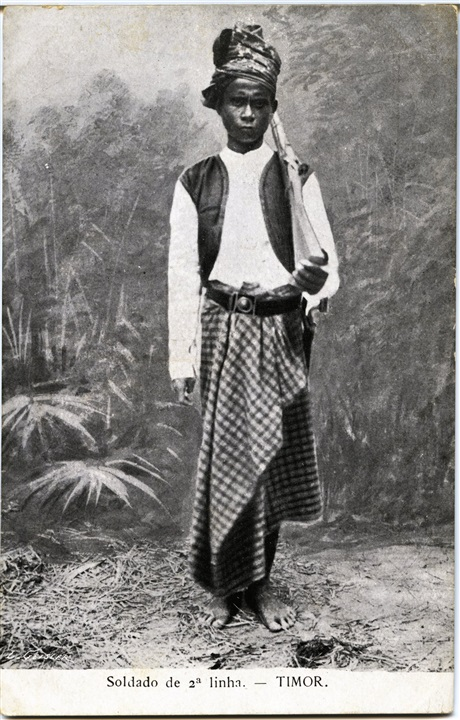
Timorese morador, 1909.

The moradores (sing. morador. Literally, "residents") were Timorese militiamen and irregulars who lived under Portuguese rule and served as auxiliaries to the Portuguese Armed Forces in Portuguese Timor in the 19th and early 20th century.

Portuguese forces in Timor were divided in a first line of a regular army soldiers, officers, column commanders, sergeants and artillerymen and a second line of Timorese moradores militiamen on foot or horseback, trained and led by Portuguese or Timorese sergeants and officers. In times of war, allied Timorese kings were called up to lead contingents of their warriors on campaign.

In Lifau, the moradores were also called toppas (i.e. topasses) kase metan ("strange black" in Atoni) and zwarte portugezen ("black portuguese" in Dutch).

Due to the great distance from Europe, Portugal deployed few regular army soldiers on Timor. In 1896 for instance, the Portuguese administration carried out a campaign against the Kingdom of Dato-Talo in which it mobilized 208 soldiers, four cannon, artillerymen, officers, 560 moradores and 7,558 auxiliaries. In the formation of the territory of modern-day East Timor, it is estimated that about 2,200 soldiers participated in 56 campaigns between 1847 and 1913, supported by some 6,000 Timorese moradores and 108,000 Timorese auxiliaries led by allied kings, the Timorese accounting for 98% of the forces employed by the Portuguese.

== Gallery ==
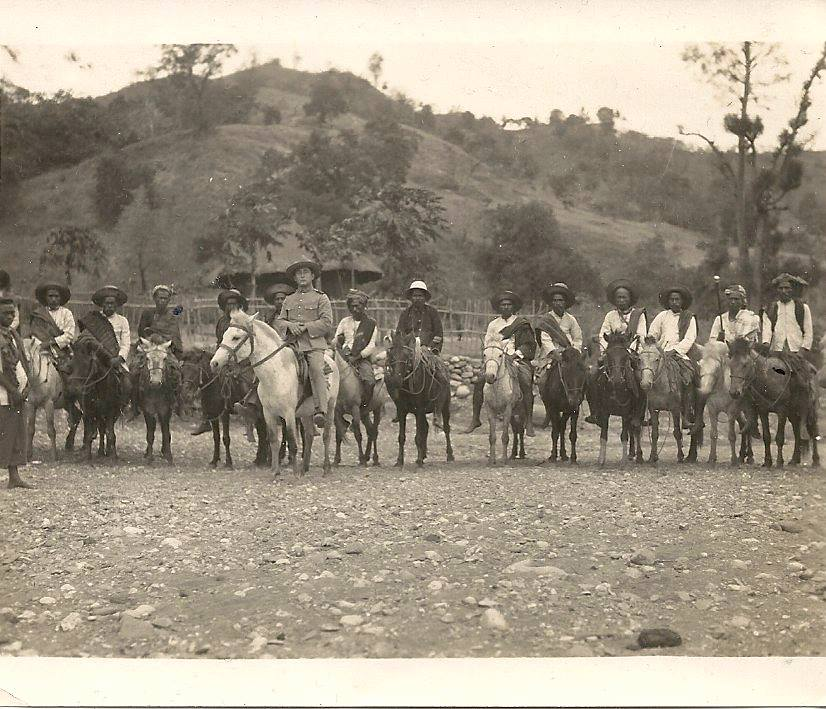
Timorese cavalry forces led by António Macedo.

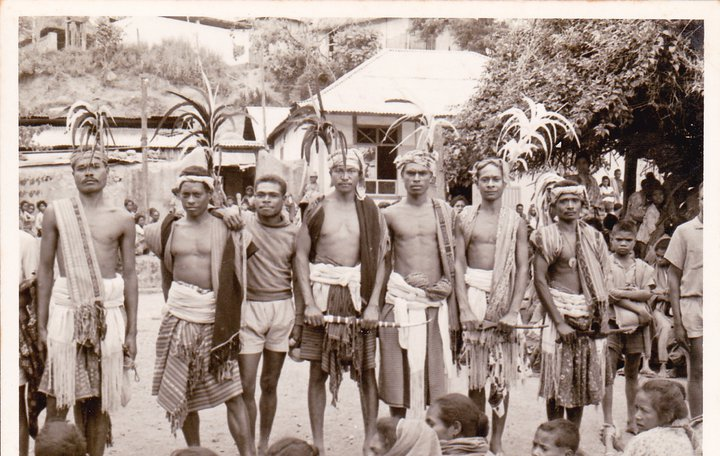
Moradores in Atsabe.

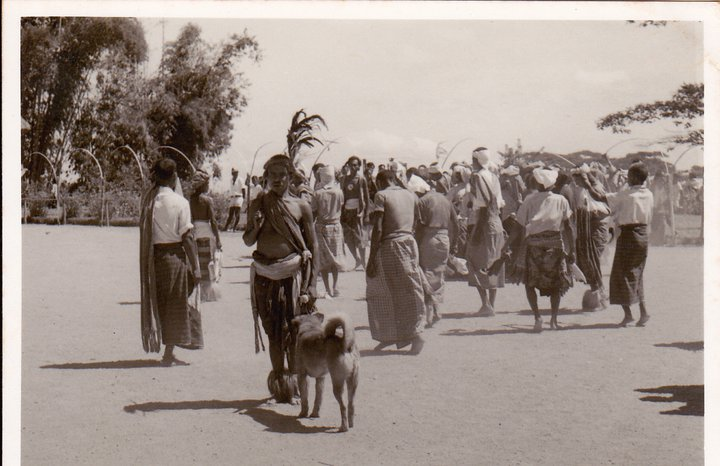
Moradores in Atsabe.

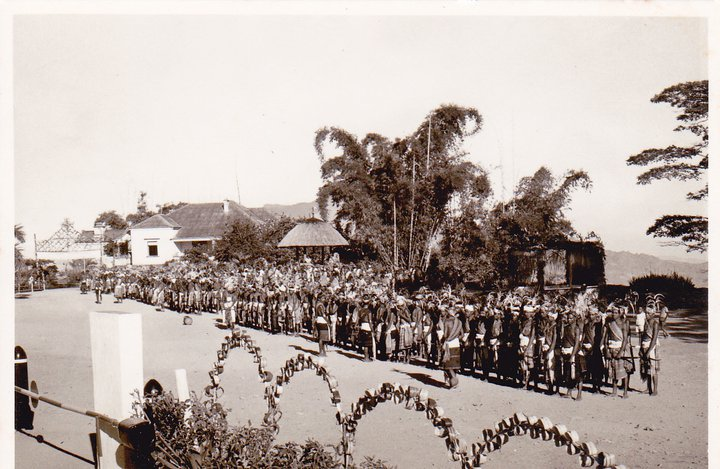
A company of moradores in Atsabe

Cerimonial parade of moradores in 1966.

== See also ==
- Portuguese Campaigns of Pacification and Occupation
- History of Timor-Leste
