= José Celestino da Silva =

Portuguese officer

General José Celestino da Silva GOIC, ComNSC
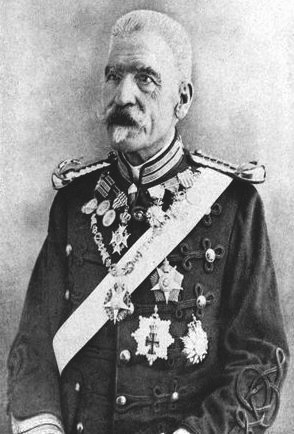

Governor of Portuguese Timor
- In office 1894–1908
- Monarch: Carlos I of Portugal
- Preceded by: Porfírio Zeferino de Sousa
- Succeeded by: Jaime Augusto Viera da Rocha; (Acting Governor)

Personal details
- Born: 6 January 1849: Vilar de Nantes, Chaves, Portugal
- Died: 10 February 1911 (aged 62) Lisbon, Portugal

Military service
- Allegiance: Portugal
- Branch/service: (Portugal) Portuguese Army
- Years of service: c. 1865–1910
- Rank: General
- Battles/wars: Campaigns of Pacification and Occupation
- Awards: Grand Officer of the Order of the Colonial Empire (1932); Commander of the Order of the Immaculate Conception of Vila Viçosa (1894)

General José Celestino da Silva, GOIC, ComNSC (6 January 1849 – 10 February 1911) was a Portuguese Army officer and colonial administrator. Between 1894 and 1908, he was governor of the colony of Portuguese Timor.

== Early life and career ==
Celestino da Silva was born in Vilar de Nantes, Chaves, Portugal, on 6 January 1849. He attended the School of the Army, from which he graduated in 1865 as best in class. In 1869, he was given the rank of ensign. In that capacity, he was assigned to Prince Carlos, later Carlos I of Portugal, and a friendship arose between the two. In 1875, he was promoted to lieutenant, and in 1883 to captain in the 2nd Lancers Regiment.

== Governorship ==
In 1894, Celestino da Silva was appointed to the rank of Major, and as Governor of Portuguese Timor. Under him, the dominance of Portuguese rule in the colony was consolidated. In three major offensives launched in 1894-95, he carried on wars of pacification against certain kingdoms. He also draw up terms of vassalage with several native petty kings (Liurai), but even so, he had to quell various rebellions. Overall, he conducted more than 20 military actions during his tenure as governor.

From Celestino da Silva's point of view, future wars could only be prevented if the military, civilian officials and the missionaries did a good job. During his tenure, the finta tax, which had been levied in kind, was replaced with a poll tax. He founded schools in various parts of the colony where the population was taught the basics of agriculture in order to apply them to coffee cultivation for export. He and one of his successors, Filomeno da Câmara de Melo Cabral (who was Governor from 1911 to 1913), made efforts to establish the coconut palm tree, which had been grown in Timor even before the Portuguese arrived, as a cash crop. He also set up regular sea connections with Macau and Australia, and a colonial telephone network several hundred kilometres long. The swamps of Dili were drained, a water supply was established, and in 1906 a modern hospital was built.

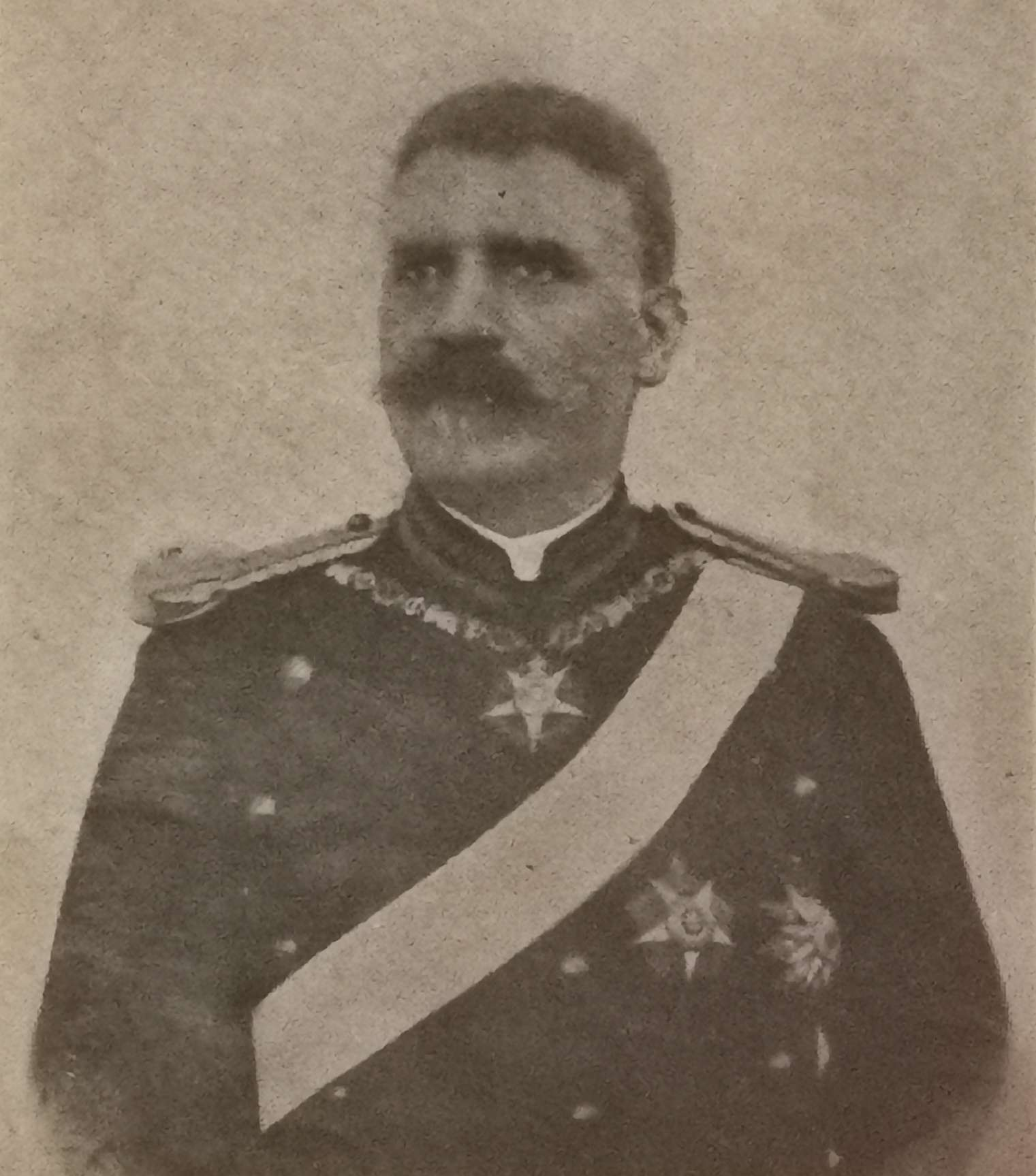
Portrait of Celestino da Silva as Governor of Timor.

However, Celestino da Silva also used his position as governor to enrich himself, both at the expense of the Portuguese state and at the expense of the Timorese inhabitants. He was either involved in, or the owner of, almost all private plantation companies that emerged for the first time in his reign. He also illegally provided these companies with Timorese forced laborers. In 1897, he established the Sociedade Agrícola Pátria e Trabalho (SAPT), which eventually acquired wide-ranging monopolies in the colony, and even after World War II was majority owned by his descendants. Contemporary critics mockingly called him "King of Timor".

Only after Celestino da Silva's friend King Carlos I was assassinated in 1908 was the governor recalled. As it was feared that Celestino de Silva would not voluntarily vacate his post, his successor, Eduardo Augusto Marques, was accompanied by the Director General of Overseas, Captain Gonçalo Pereira Pimenta de Castro, who would arrest Celestino da Silva in an emergency. However, for health reasons Celestino da Silva had meanwhile appointed Captain Jaime Augusto Viera da Rocha as acting governor, and had traveled with his wife to Australia. After he returned to Dili, he even offered his help to Marques, as Castro's father, General Joaquim Pimenta de Castro, was a friend of his.

== Later career ==
On the trip home, Celestino da Silva's ill wife died. Following his return to Portugal, he was appointed as Commander of a Cavalry Regiment in Almeida. In 1910, after the proclamation of the Republic, he was promoted to the rank of General and placed in the reserve. He died on 10 February 1911.

== Honours and awards ==
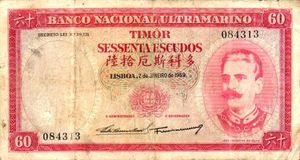
A sixty Timorese Escudo banknote from 1959, featuring the former governor's portrait.

Celestino da Silva was a knight of the Order of Aviz and of the Order of the Tower and Sword. For his achievements on Timor, he was awarded the gold medal for military merit and the gold medal of Queen Amélie. In 1932, he was posthumously appointed Grand Officer of the Order of the Colonial Empire. In the late 1950s, the Banco Nacional Ultramarino decided to issue new Portuguese Timorese escudo banknotes depicting Celestino da Silva's image to replace the previously circulating Portuguese Timorese pataca notes. The new banknotes began circulating in January 1960.

Government offices
| Preceded by Porfírio Zeferino de Sousa | Governor of Portuguese Timor; 1894–1908 | Succeeded by Jaime Augusto Viera da Rocha as Acting Governor |
