= António José Teles de Meneses =

Portuguese colonial administrator

Governor of Macau
- In office 1747–1749
- Preceded by: Cosme Damião Pereira Pinto
- Succeeded by: João Manuel de Melo

Colonial governor of Portuguese Timor
- In office 1768–1776
- Preceded by: Dionísio Gonçalves Rebelo Galvão
- Succeeded by: Caetano de Lemos Telo de Meneses

António José Teles de Meneses was a Portuguese colonial administrator who was successively the governor of Macau and governor of Portuguese Timor while these territories were part of the Portuguese State of India. He was the 42nd governor of Macau, having served between 1747 and 1749.

He was governor of Timor between 1768 and 1776, having been preceded by Dionísio Gonçalves Rebelo Galvão and succeeded by Caetano de Lemos Telo de Meneses.

According to Carlos Filipe Ximenes Belo, the "Governor of Timor, António José Teles de Meneses, seeing the impossibility of defending Lifau by sea and land, took the historic decision to destroy the stronghold on August 11, 1769 and to move to the province of Belos. After some hesitation, he sailed to the bay of Dilly, and there founded the new capital of Timor and Solor, on the 10th of October, 1769".

== See also ==
- List of colonial governors of Portuguese Timor
