= Palácio de Lahane =

Historic building in Timor-Leste

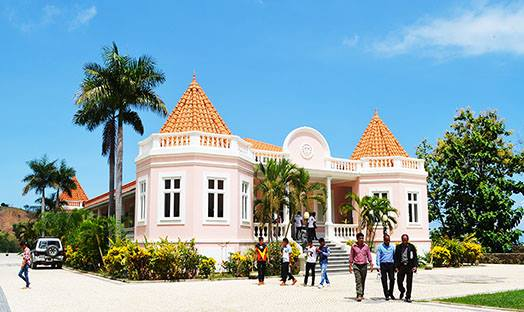
- The palace in 2016
- Interactive map of the Palácio de Lahane area
- Alternative names: Palácio das Nobres

General information
- Type: Official residence; Reception centre
- Architectural style: Portuguese colonial
- Location: Lahane Ocidental, Timor-Leste
- Coordinates: 8°34′27″S 125°35′04″E
- Construction started: c. 1885
- Completed: c. 1933
- Renovated: 2004–2008
- Owner: Government of Timor-Leste

The Palácio de Lahane (transl. Lahane Palace), (Note: The expression Palácio de Lahane is usually not translated in English language sources) also known as the Palácio das Nobres (transl. Nobre Palace or, lit., Palace of the Nobles), is a historic building in Timor-Leste. As of 2022, its primary function was as a reception space for the East Timorese government.

== History ==
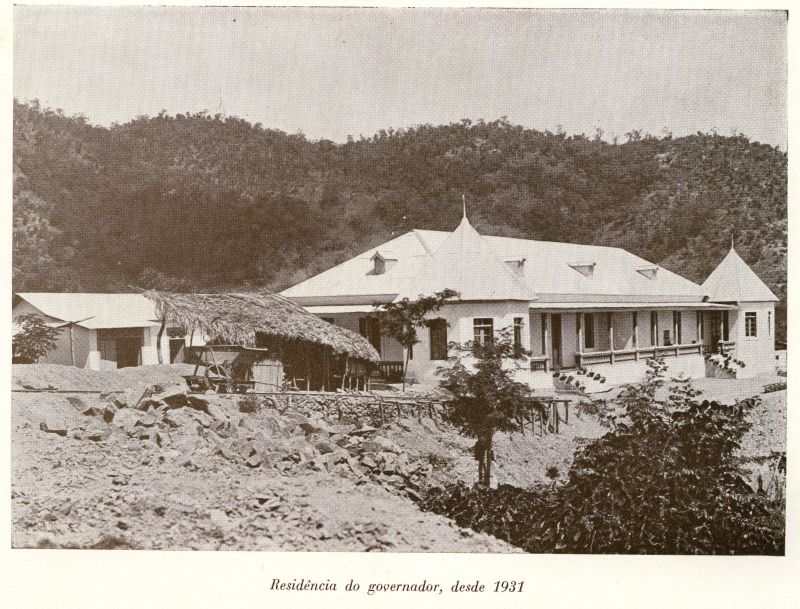
The palace, c. 1930s

Conceived as an official residence for the colonial governors of Portuguese Timor, the palace has its roots in a house built on the site in 1860–61, during the governorship of Afonso de Castro (1859 to 1861 and 1862 to 1863). Construction of that house was a first step in the relocation of the colony's capital from Dili to the mountains; the lowlands around the Bay of Dili were considered to be malaria-infested, especially during the rainy season.

Governor João Maria Pereira (1883–1885) later planned the building of an official residence at the site, but it was only during the governorship of Alfredo de Lacerda Maia (1885–1887) that Pereira's plan was realised, as the Palácio de Lahane. Built between 1884 and 1886, it was an elongated building with turrets. In the early 1930s, it was replaced by a new official residence, in a style vaguely reminiscent of that of chalets, with colonial art deco influences.

In October 1942, during the closing stages of the Battle of Timor, which was ultimately won by the Japanese forces, most of the Portuguese civilians remaining in Portuguese Timor were interned by the Japanese, and the governor, Manuel Ferreira de Carvalho, was confined to the palace. There, he and 18 other people, including members of his family, survived on rations provided by the Japanese. Normally, they received only rice, and all occupants of the palace, including the servants, would share the rations. The only exception to the "normal" ration was on 5 October, Portugal's Republic Day (Portuguese: Implantação da República), when the Japanese would pay their respects to the governor: "At that time they gave us fish and meat to cook for them."

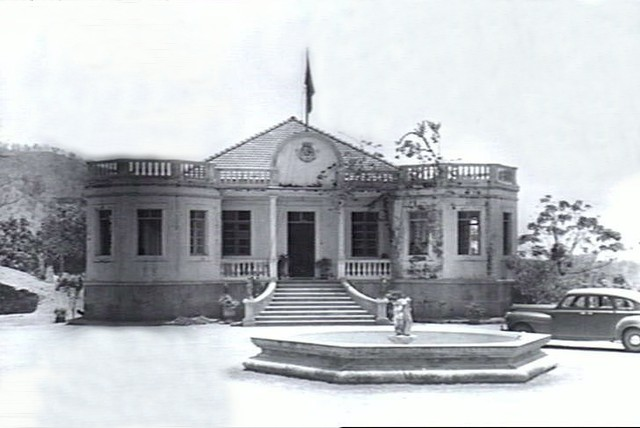
The palace in 1945

On 1 September 1945, the day before the Empire of Japan signed the instrument of surrender aboard USS Missouri in Tokyo Bay to bring World War II to an end, the Japanese vice consul made another special visit to the governor at the palace, to inform him of the surrender of Japan on 15 August 1945.

On 28 November 1975, the Fretilin political party made a unilateral declaration of independence of East Timor from Portuguese colonial rule. On 1 December 1975, in a ceremony held at the palace, Fretilin inaugurated a Council of Ministers of the newly independent nation. However, Indonesia then invaded East Timor, and, on 17 December 1975, brought about a de facto usurpation of the Council of Ministers, by forming a Provisional Government of East Timor (PGET) (Indonesian: Pemerintah Sementara Timor Timur (PSTT)). During the ensuing Indonesian occupation of East Timor between 1975 and 1999, the palace was known as the State Building (Indonesian: Gedung Negara), and was used for ceremonial purposes.

Over time, the palace substantially deteriorated, especially in 1999, in the aftermath of the East Timorese independence referendum. In 2004, two years after Timor-Leste resumed its independence, the Mayor of Lisbon and the Prime Minister of Timor-Leste entered into a protocol with the objective of reconstructing the palace and redesignating it as the official residence of the president of Timor-Leste. The project, budgeted at €2.3 million, would be funded by the Lisbon City Council (CML). The first phase, expected to be concluded on 20 May 2005, the third anniversary of the resumption of independence, would be restoration of the palace and external arrangements. The second phase, due for completion in October 2005, would include the construction of the official residence and work offices.

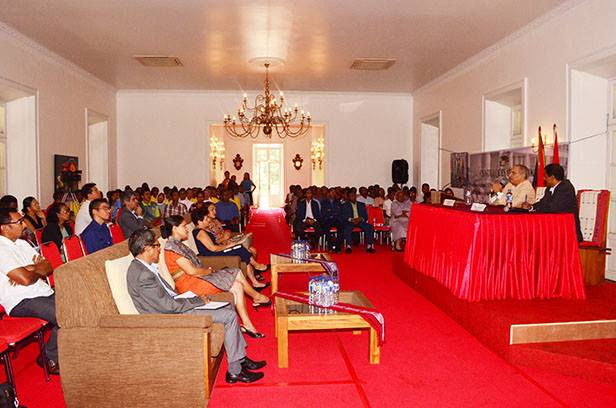
Event hall inside the palace in 2016

The project was ready to begin in October 2004, but later ran into difficulties. Construction was still underway in 2007, and the CML became unable to complete the works. José Ramos-Horta, who was elected president in 2007, announced an unwillingness to move into the palace as an official residence. In June 2008, the East Timorese government awarded a $2.6 million contract for the completion of the project. The refurbished palace, extended with an annex building at the rear, is intended only as a reception space and temporary housing for the president or for guests.

In February 2018, President Francisco Guterres and members of his staff planted trees in the grounds of the palace, to improve its environment. In October 2020, Centro Nacional Chega! presented him with a plan for the palace's improvement. The plan was to transform the palace into a centre of 'public recognition', celebration, solidarity, reflection and learning, and make it a tourist attraction. Central to it was a memorial to recall the swearing-in of Francisco Xavier do Amaral as president on 29 November 1975 and the formal inauguration of the first government at the palace on 30 November 1975. In response, the President announced that he would decide the final design to be used for the memorial.
