= Bidau =

Village in Sumy Oblast, Ukraine

Bidau Bidau Lecidere, Monumento
- Suco
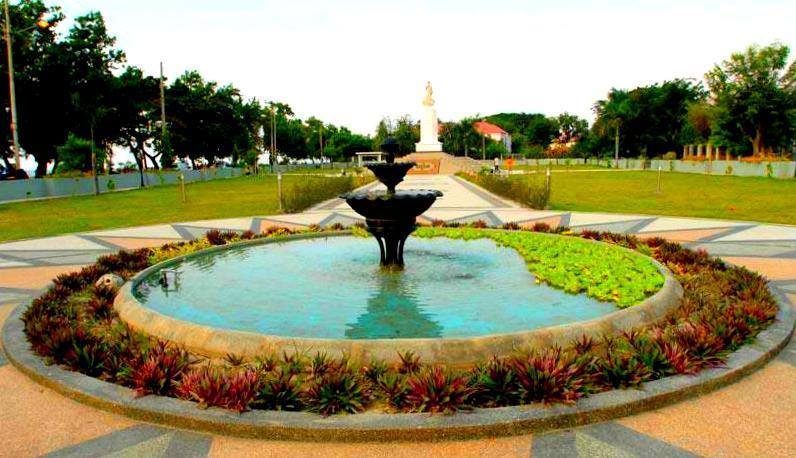
- Praca da Imaculada Conceicao in Lecidere, Dili

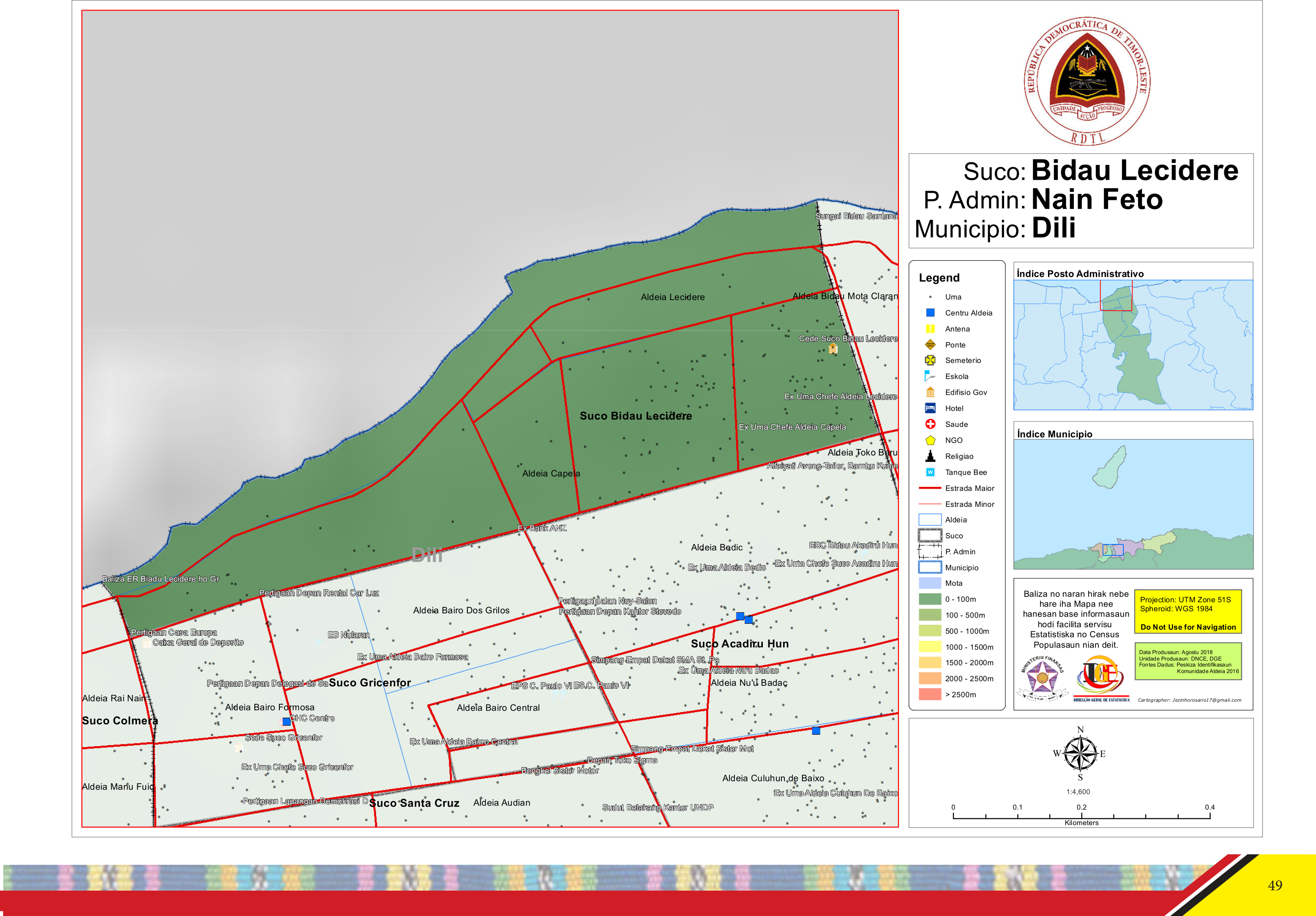
- Map of Bidau Lecidere

- Location in Timor-Leste
- Coordinates: 8°33′6″S 125°34′54″E
- Country: Timor-Leste
- Municipality: Dili
- Administrative posts: Nain Feto

Area
  - Total: 0.33 km^{2} (0.13 sq mi)

Population (2015)
  - Total: 648
- Time zone: UTC +9

Bidau Lecidere (formerly Monumento) is a suco in Cristo Rei Administrative Post, Dili Municipality, Timor-Leste.

== Geography ==
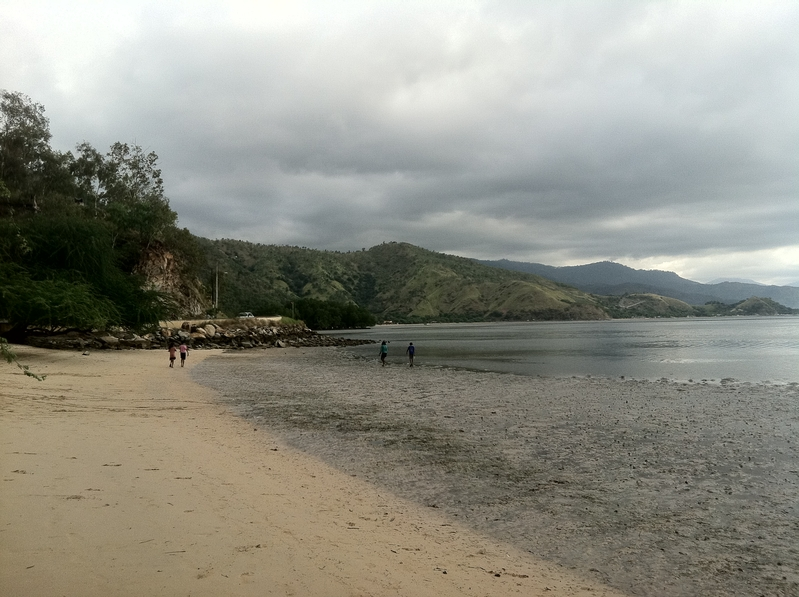
Shores of Lecidere

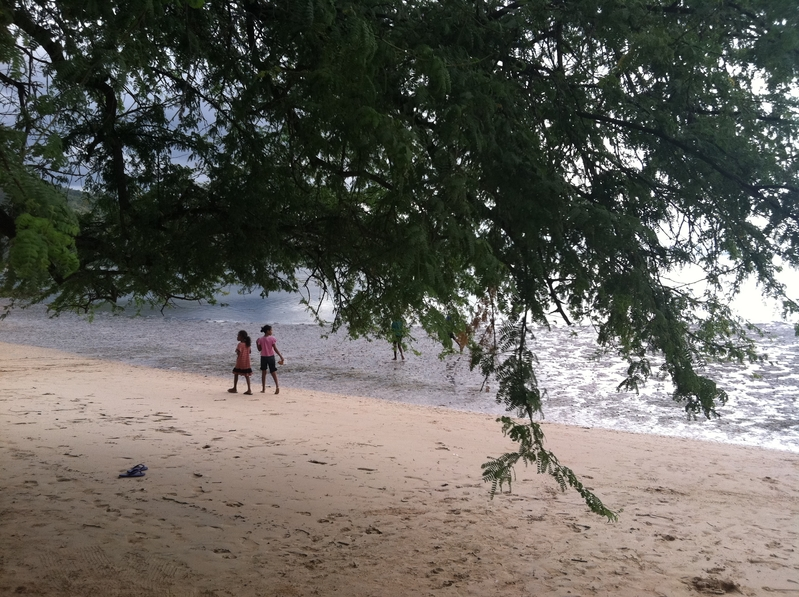
Shores of Lecidere

Bidau Lecidere is located on the northern edge of the Nain Feto administrative district, on the southern shore of the Bay of Dili and has an area of 0.33 km². The boundaries of the suco were not changed during the 2015 territorial reform. To the east lies the Bairo Lecidere district. South of Rua 30 de Agosto (formerly Av. Dr. António da Câmara or Rua José Maria Marques) are the sucos Gricenfor and Acadiru Hun. East of the Mota Bidau River and Avenida Dom Martinho Lopes (formerly Estrada de Bidau or Estrada de Lecidere) is the Cristo Rei administrative district with its Suco Bidau Santana and west of Avenida Xavier do Amaral (formerly Avenida Bispo Medeiros) is the Vera Cruz administrative district with its Suco Colmera. Avenida Marginal runs along the coast.

The Suco divides into the two Aldeias, Capela and Lecidere.

== History ==
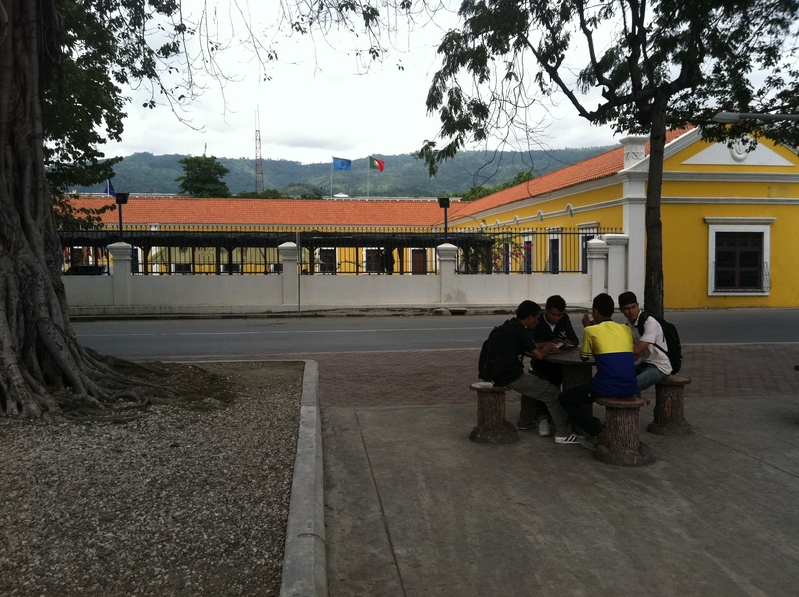
Casa Europa

The Bidau district, now divided into Bidau Lecidere and Bidau Santana, was originally settled by the Bidau ethnic group. This mixed population of Portuguese and locals from Larantuka (Flores), Solor, and Timor controlled large parts of West Timor for centuries. Until the 1960s, they spoke Bidau Creole Portuguese, a creole form of Portuguese. Over time, they increasingly switched to standard Portuguese and it went extinct in the 1960s.

The body of Francisco Borja da Costa, composer of the East Timor national anthem, was found on the beach of Lecidere (Lécidere) in 1975 during the first days of the Indonesian invasion.

In the 2004/2005 elections, Jaime da Silva Soares was elected Chefe de Suco. In the 2009 elections, Felix CS da Conçeicão won and in 2016, Luis R. Soares Pereira won.

== Population ==
The Suco has a population of 1,212 (2022), of whom 634 are men and 578 are women. 682 of them live in an urban area, and 530 live in the rural part of the Suco. There are 197 households in the Suco. Almost 96 % of the inhabitants report Tetum Prasa as their mother tongue. Minority languages include Makasae, Rahesuk, Waimoa, Uab Meto, Dadu'a and Kemak.

== Sights, buildings and facilities ==
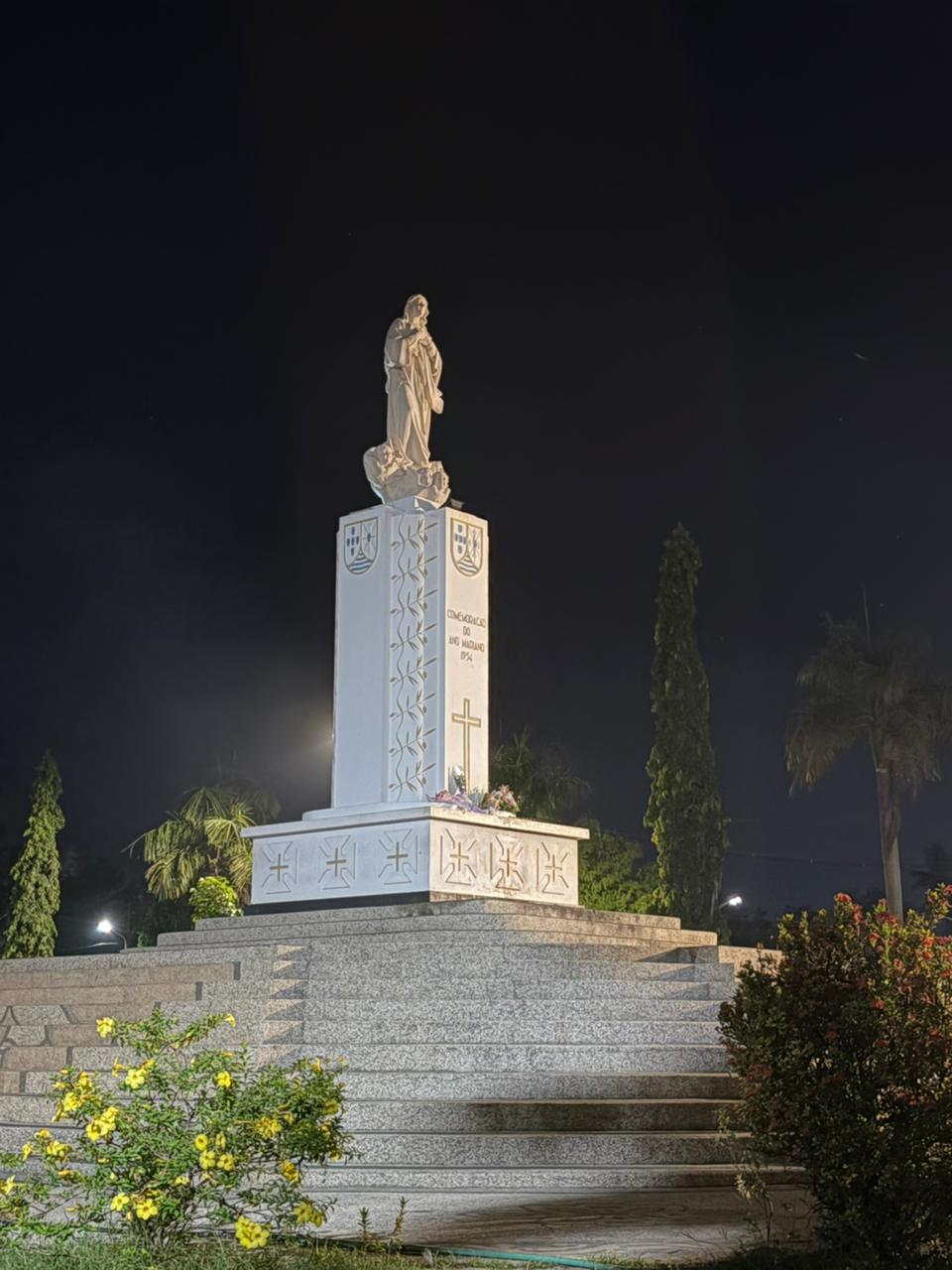
Monument to the Mother of God.

The western tip of the Sucos is occupied by Casa Europa, the former Tranqueira (warehouse) of the old Portuguese fortress of Dili, which formerly housed the representation of the European Union and the offices of the Delegation of the European Union. Today, it still houses the Spanish Agency for International Development Cooperation (AECID) and the French Agency for Cooperation with the Embassy of France. Further east, on Avenida Marginal, is the building of the Chinese Commercial Association, which now houses the Secretaria Estado da Juventude e do Desporto. On the waterfront to the west is the headquarters of the Polícia Marítima. To the east is the Jardim Lecidere, a park. The last section contains a football pitch, the tourist information office, and the Ai-fuan Bazaar (fruit market). On the south side are the Hotel Dili and the World Bank Group.

After Rua de Bé-Mori, formerly Av. Belarmino Lobo, on the south side of the street is Praça da Imaculada Conceição with a fountain and the monument to the Virgin Mary. After Travessa de Lecidere, to the south are the residence of the Archdiocese of Dili and the Hotel Novo Turismo, and in a side street is the headquarters of the Canossian Sisters of Lecidere.

The Clínica Esperança hospital and the Xanana Reading Room are located on Rua de Bé-Mori. On the north side of Rua 30 de Agosto is the former residence of the director of the Banco Nacional Ultramarino building.

== Gallery ==
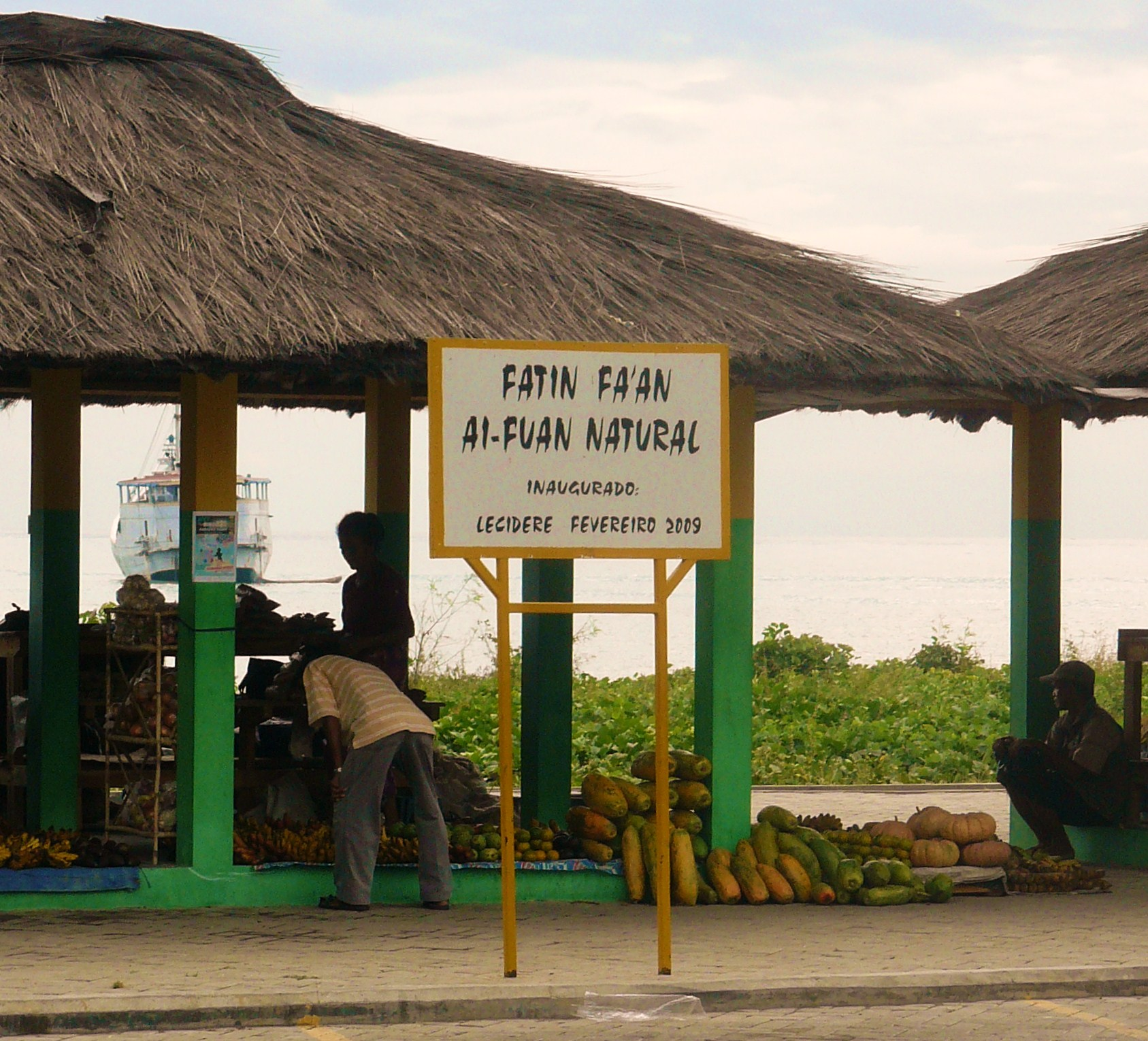
Bazar Ai-fuan

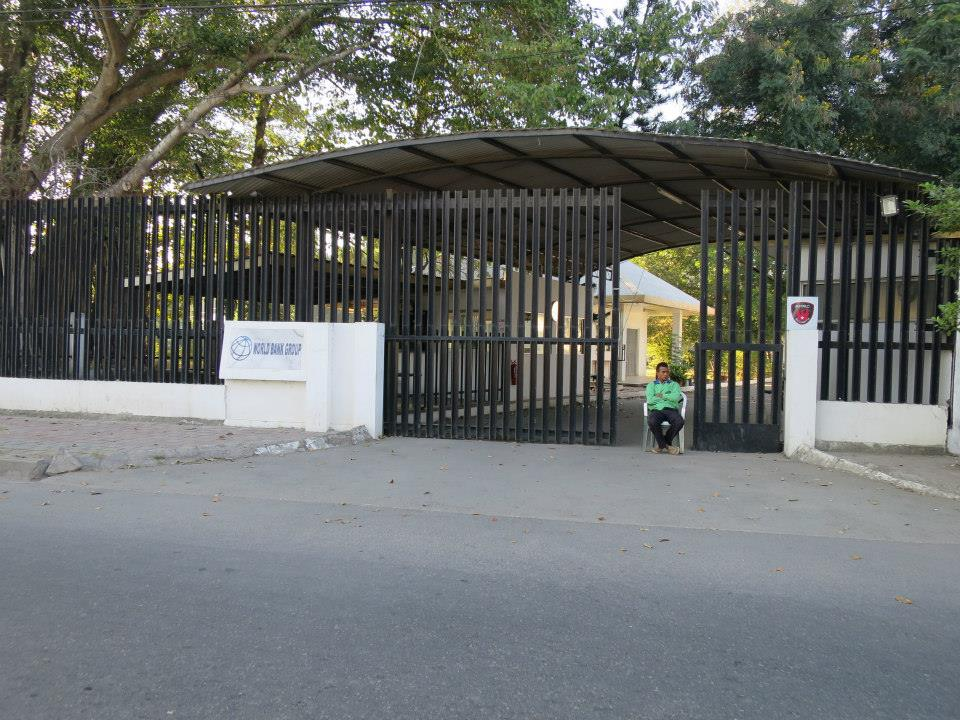
World Bank Complex

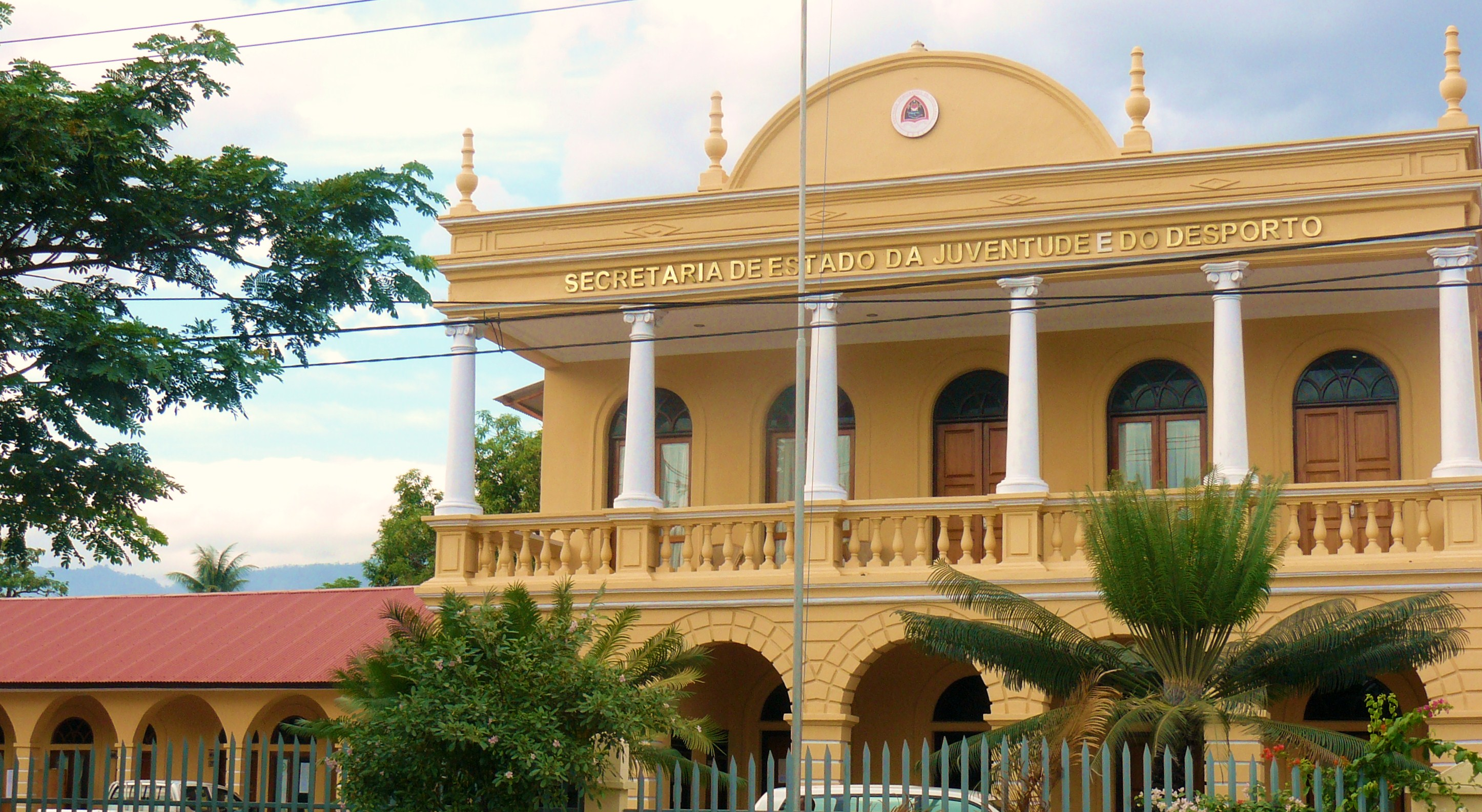
The State Secretariat for Youth and Sport is located in the former building of the Associação Comercial Chinesa.

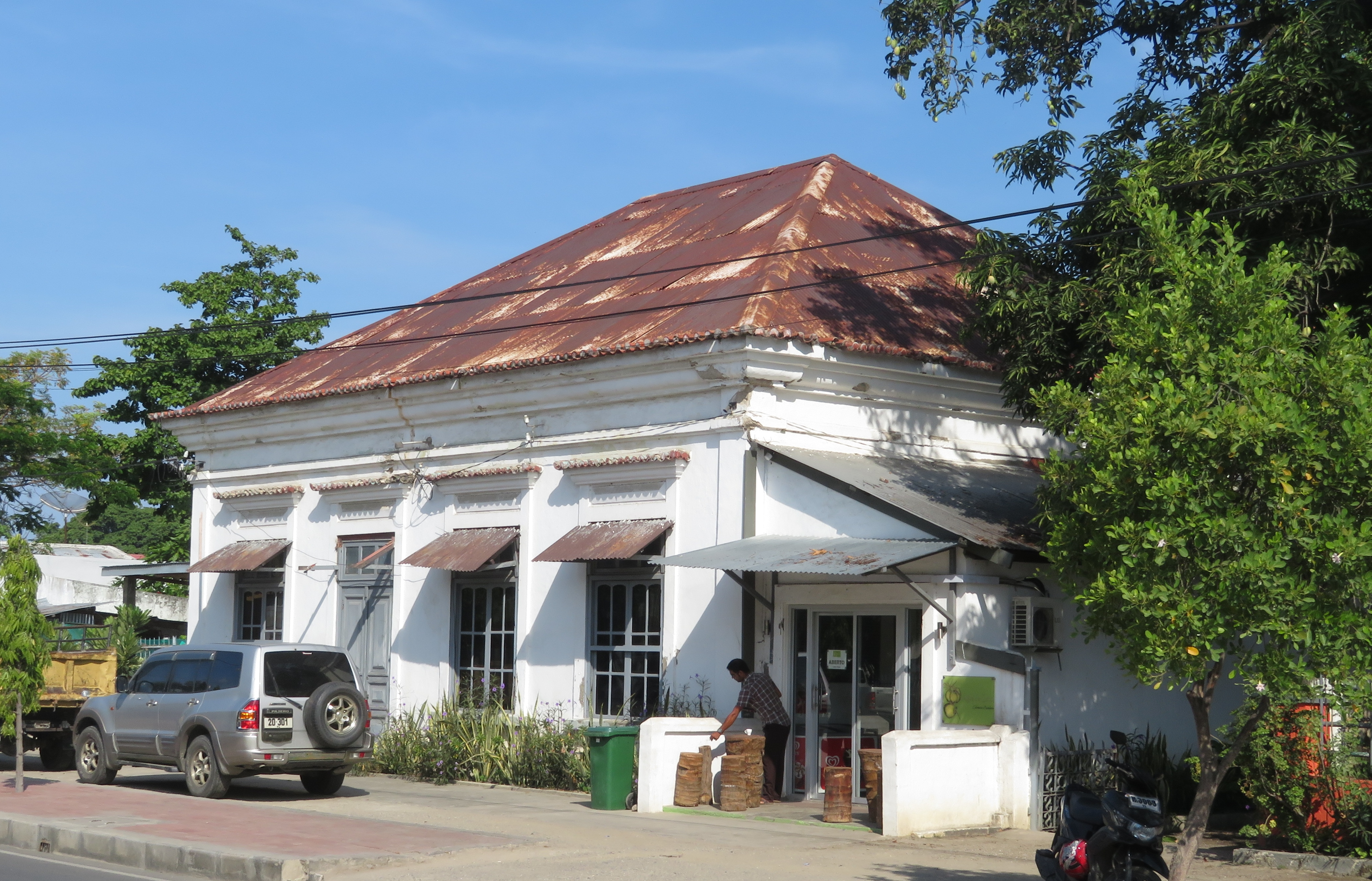
Former residence of the director of Banco Nacional Ultramarino building.

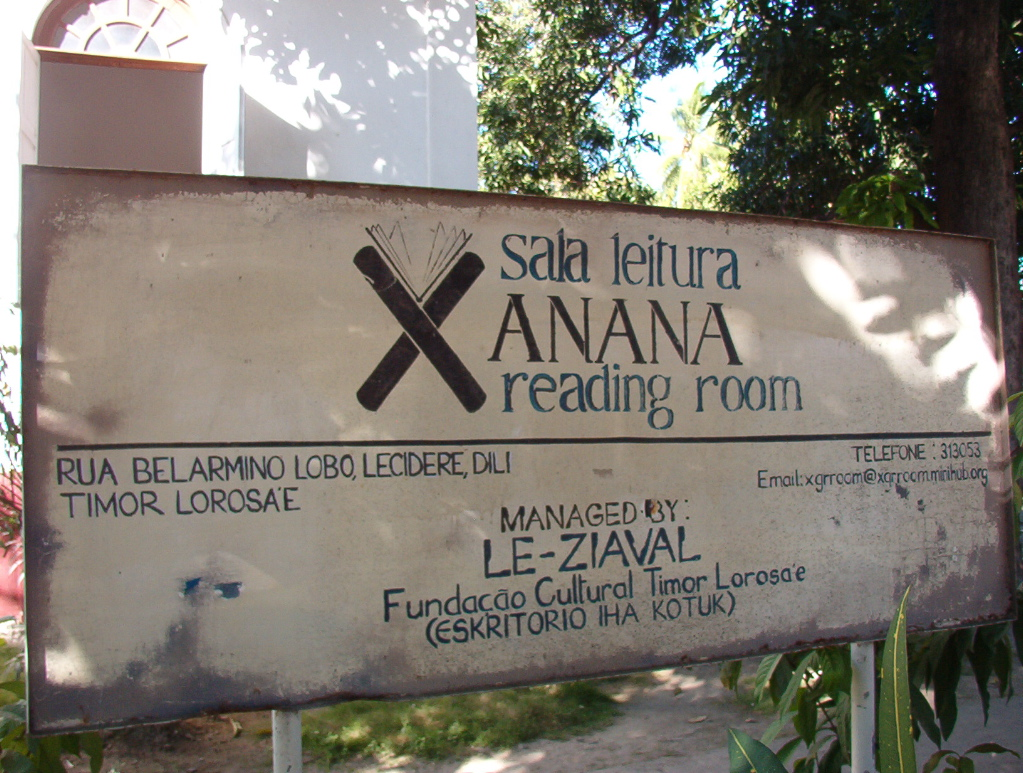
Xanana Gusmão Library

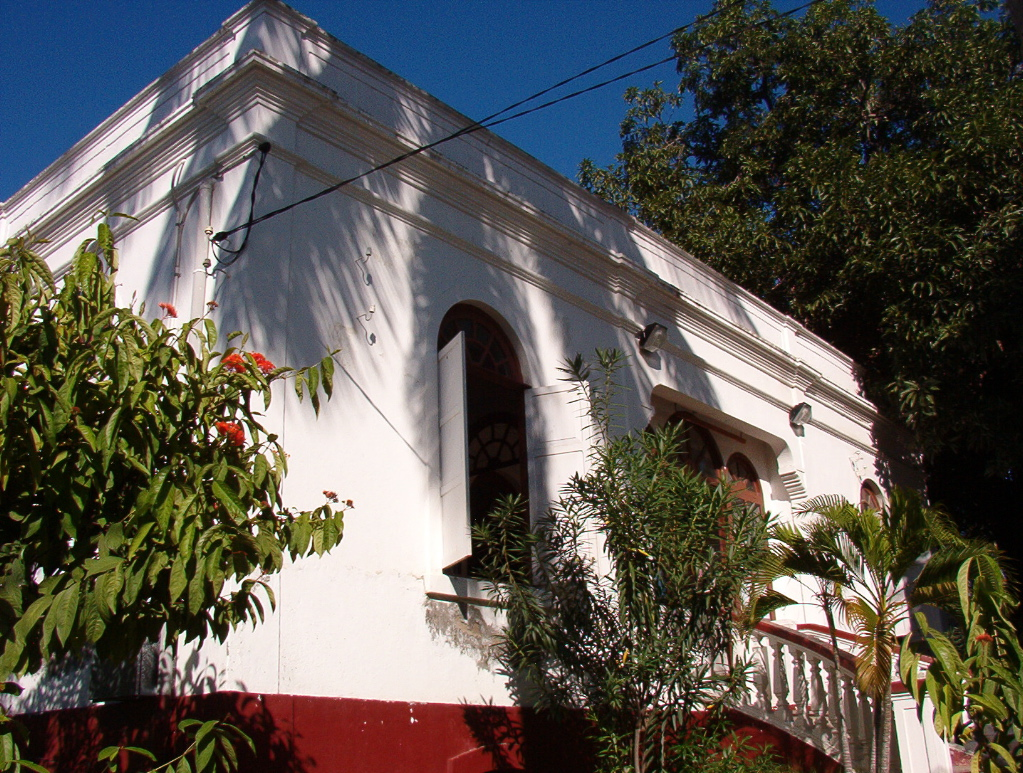
Xanana Gusmão Library

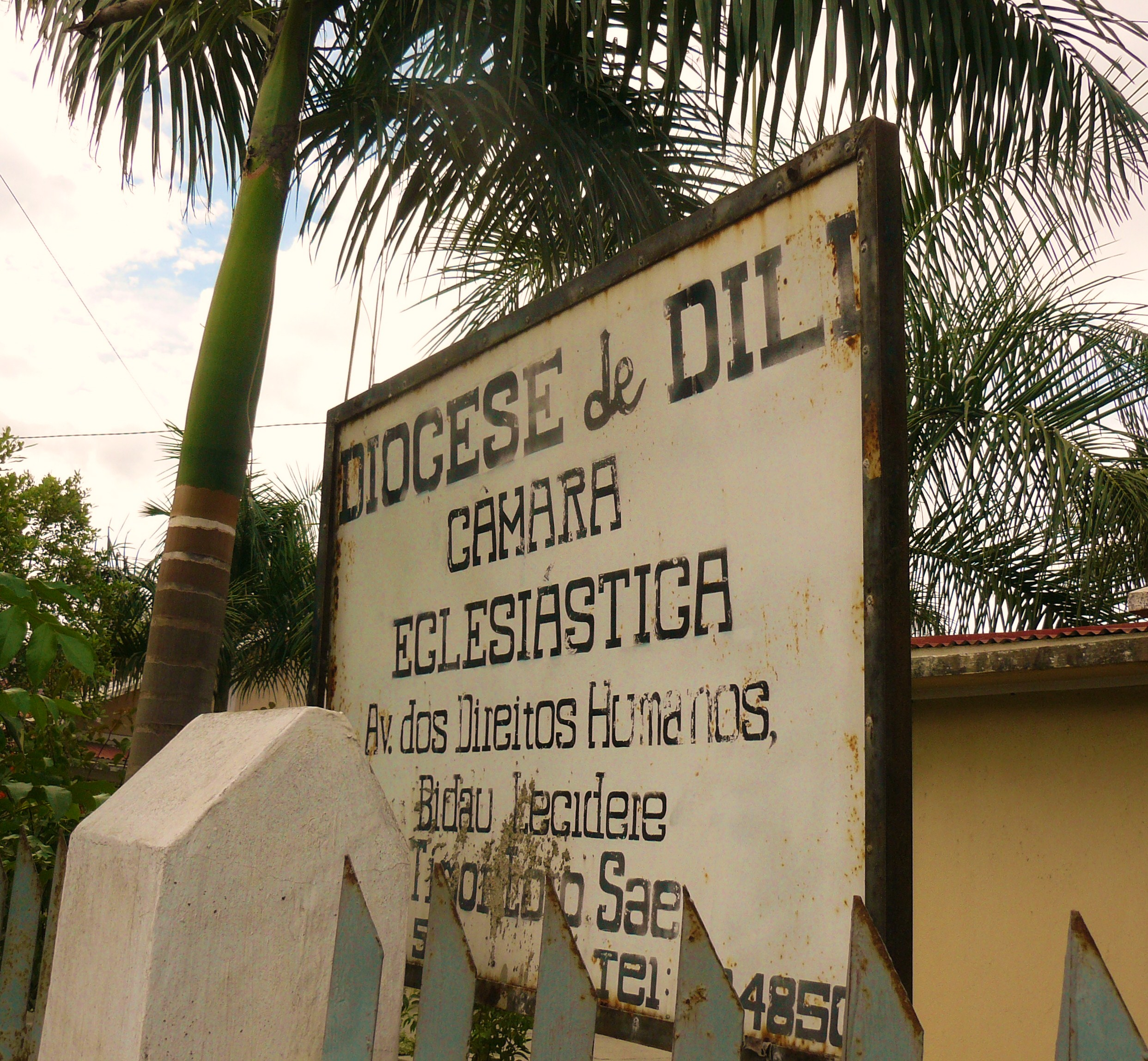
Seat of the Archdiocese of Dili

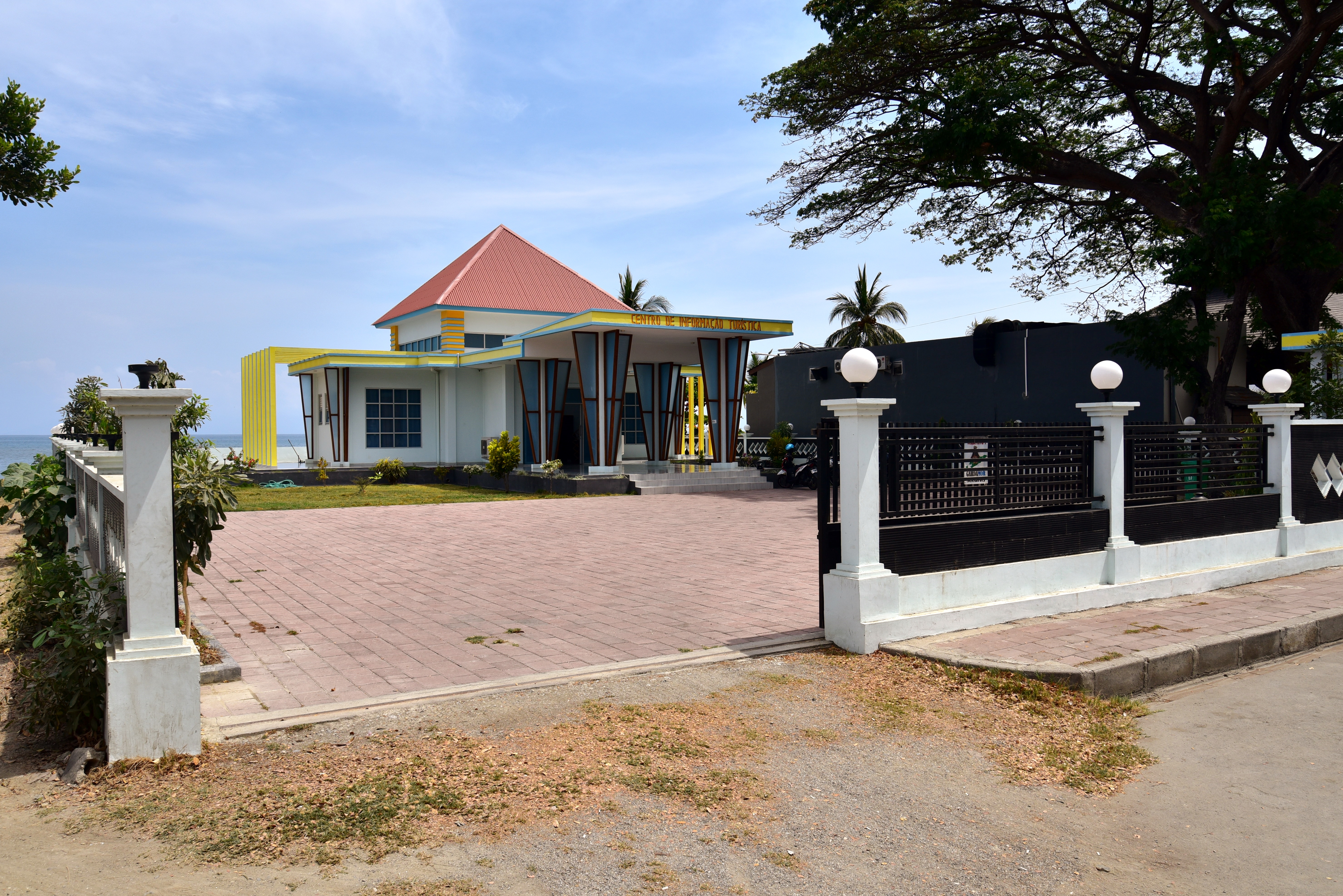
Tourist information Centre

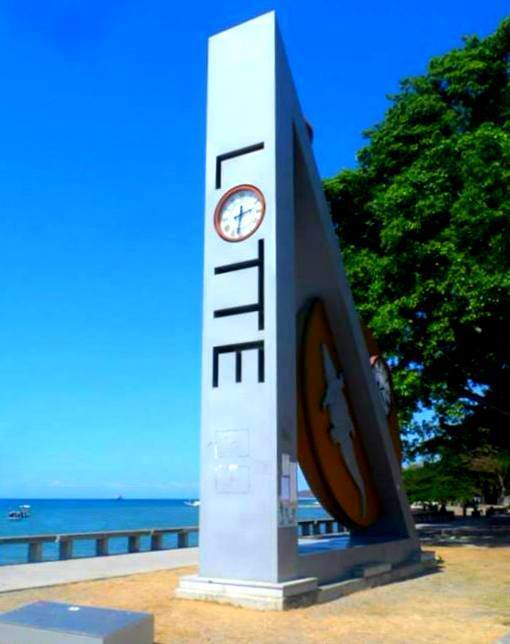
Normal clock on the shore of Dili Bay, opposite the Government Palace.
