= Metinaro =

Town in East Timor

Coordinates: 8°32′S 125°44′E

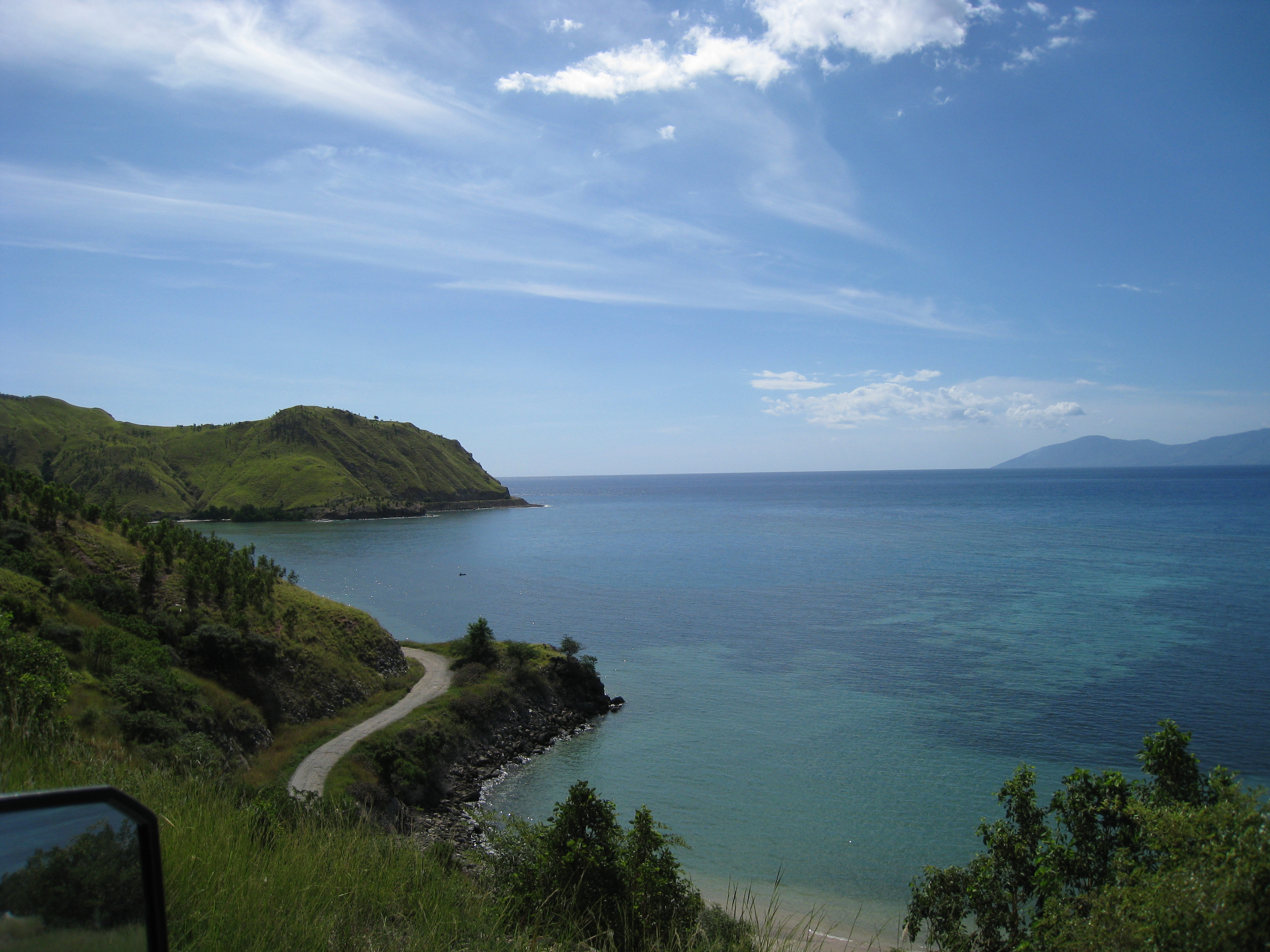
Coastline near Metinaro

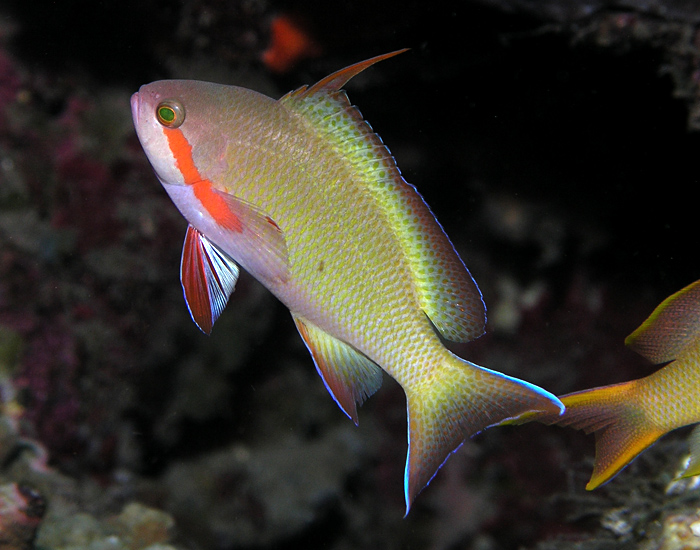
Threadfin anthias in the sea at Metinaro

Metinaro is a town in Metinaro Subdistrict, Dili District, East Timor.

Metinaro is also the home of the East Timor's 1st Battalion F-FDTL (Forças de Defesa de Timor Leste). Located at the Metinaro Barracks is also the Recruit Training Centre and the Defence Force School of Languages (Defence Cooperation Programme - Australia). The Australian Army assists the F-FDTL with training and expertise. The 2nd Battalion is located at Baucau, some 1 hours drive to the East.
