= Bidau Santana =

- Suco
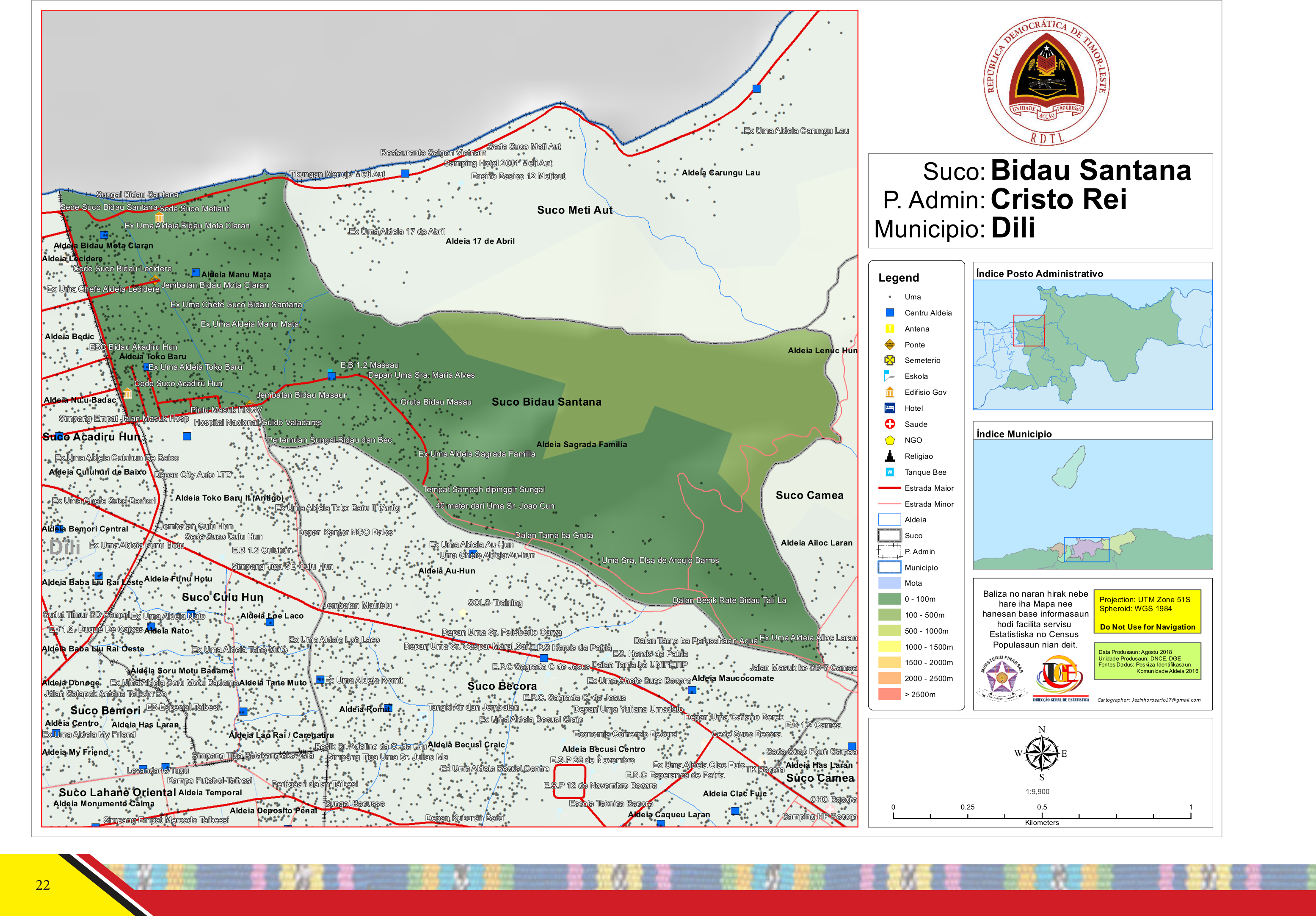
- Map of Bidau Santana

- Location in Timor-Leste
- Coordinates: 8°32′56″S 125°35′35″E
- Country: Timor-Leste
- Municipality: Dili
- Administrative posts: Cristo Rei

Area
  - Total: 1.84 km^{2} (0.71 sq mi)

Population (2015)
  - Total: 6,482
- Time zone: UTC +9

Bidau Santana is a suco in Cristo Rei Administrative Post, Dili Municipality, Timor-Leste. The administrative area covers an area of 1.84 square kilometres and at the time of the 2015 census it had a population of 6,482 people.

== Geography ==
Bidau Santana is located to the west of the Cristo Rei Administrative Post, at the east end of the Bay of Dili. Northeast lies Meti Aut, east of the Camea and south of Becora and Culu Hun. To the west, beyond Mota Bidau, is the administrative office of Nain Feto, to which Bidau Santana belonged to until 2004. Becora is bordered by the Benamauc River, which forms the Mota Claran together with the Rio Bemori and flows into the Bay of Dili. Since the municipal reform in 2015, Bidau Santana has an area of 1.84 km^{2} (0.71 sq mi).

Bidau Santana is divided into four Aldeias. Bidau Mota Claran, Manu Mata and Toko Baru to the west and Sagrada Familia to the east, occupying more than two-thirds of the Suco's area. A distinction is also made between the aldeias of Bidau Santana on the coast and Mota Claran in the southwest and Masau in the center. In the suco, there is a primary school in Masau, the Escola Primaria No. 2 Bidau Masau. Two Marian grottos with additional extensions are striking: the Gruta de Bidau Masau and the Gruta de Bidau Santana. In 2019, the B. J. Habibie Bridge was inaugurated and the Jardim B.J. Habibie park opened next to it.
