= Dare, Dili =

Coordinates: 8°56′S 125°34′E

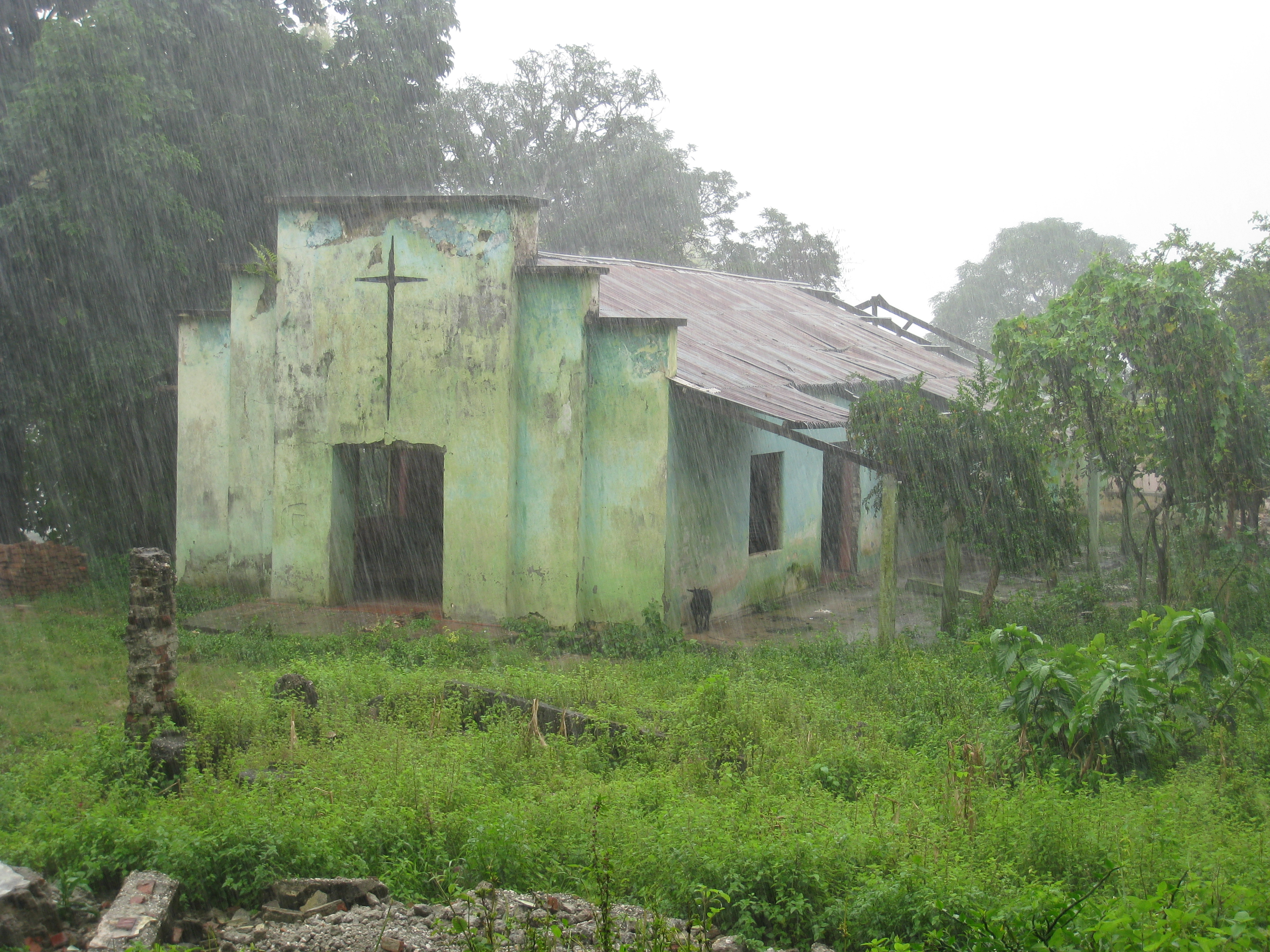
Abandoned church at Dare in the rain

Dare is a suco in Vera Cruz administrative post, Dili Municipality, Timor-Leste. It is about 30 minutes away from the centre of Dili, the country's capital city. Beginning in 1950, it has been home to the Roman Catholic Seminary of Our Lady of Fatima, which was the only tertiary-level educational institution in Portuguese Timor.

Also located in Dare is the Dare Memorial, dedicated to the East Timorese people, built by the Australian Forces that fought in Timor during World War II.
