= Bidau Creole Portuguese =

Portuguese-based creole language

- Timor Pidgin
- Native to: East Timor
- Region: Bidau, Dili
- Extinct: 1960s
- Language family: Portuguese Creole: Malayo-Portuguese Creole; Bidau Creole Portuguese
- Dialects: Macaísta; Português de Bidau

Language codes
- ISO 639-3: tvy
- Glottolog: timo1258
- Linguasphere: 51-AAC-ahf

Bidau Creole Portuguese, also known as Timor Pidgin was a Portuguese-based creole language that was spoken in Bidau, Nain Feto, an eastern suburb of Dili, East Timor.

Bidau Creole Portuguese is believed to have grown out of the Portuguese spoken by settlers and mestiços from Flores Island (especially the Sikka), influenced by languages introduced to the area by military men from Lifau. It shares a number of features with nearby creoles such as Macanese.
