= Vera Cruz Administrative Post =

Administrative post in Dili Municipality, East Timor

Vera Cruz
- Administrative Post
- Posto Administrativo de Vera Cruz (Portuguese); Postu Administrativu Vera Cruz (Tetun)
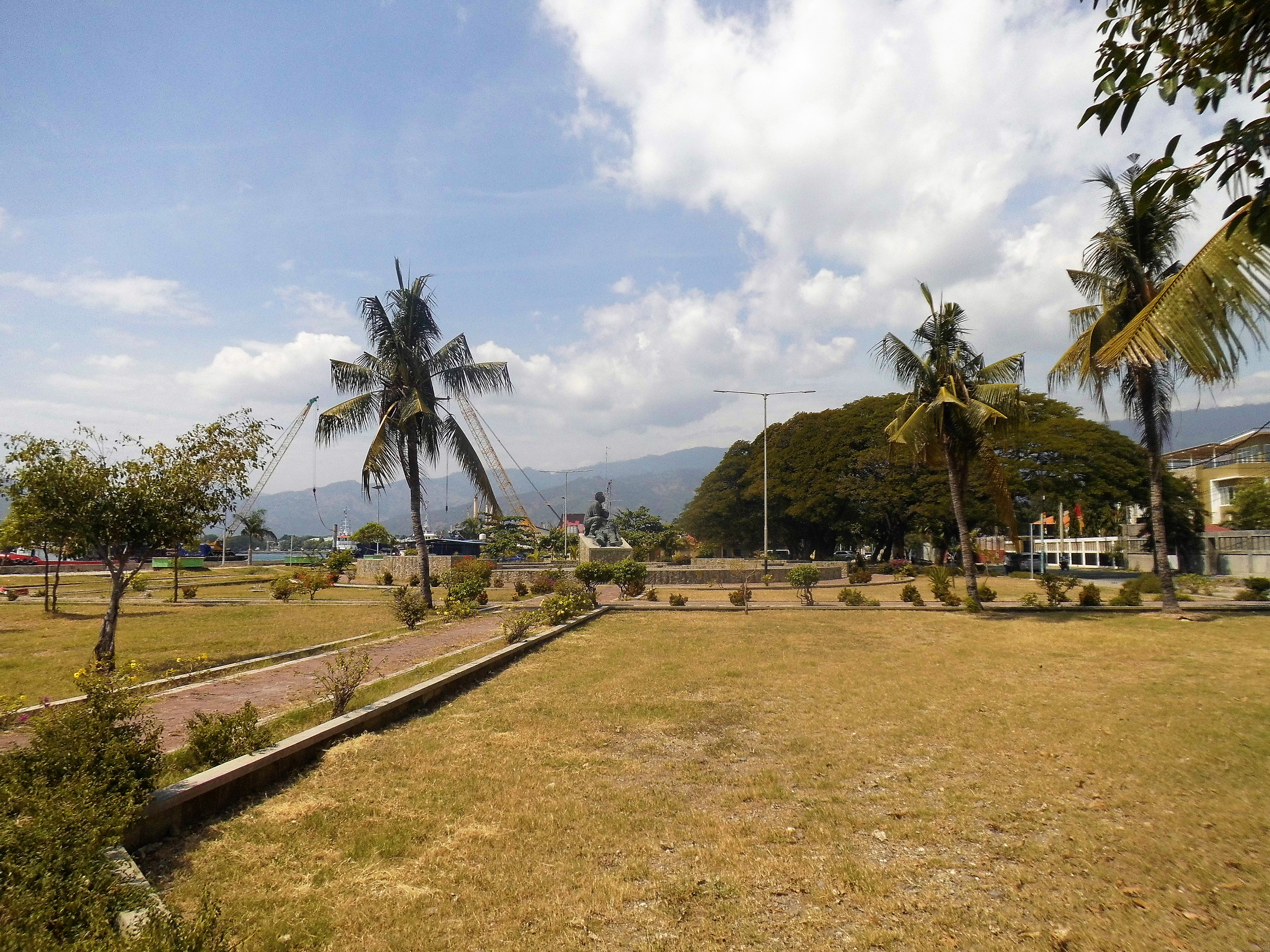
- View of Jardim Motael

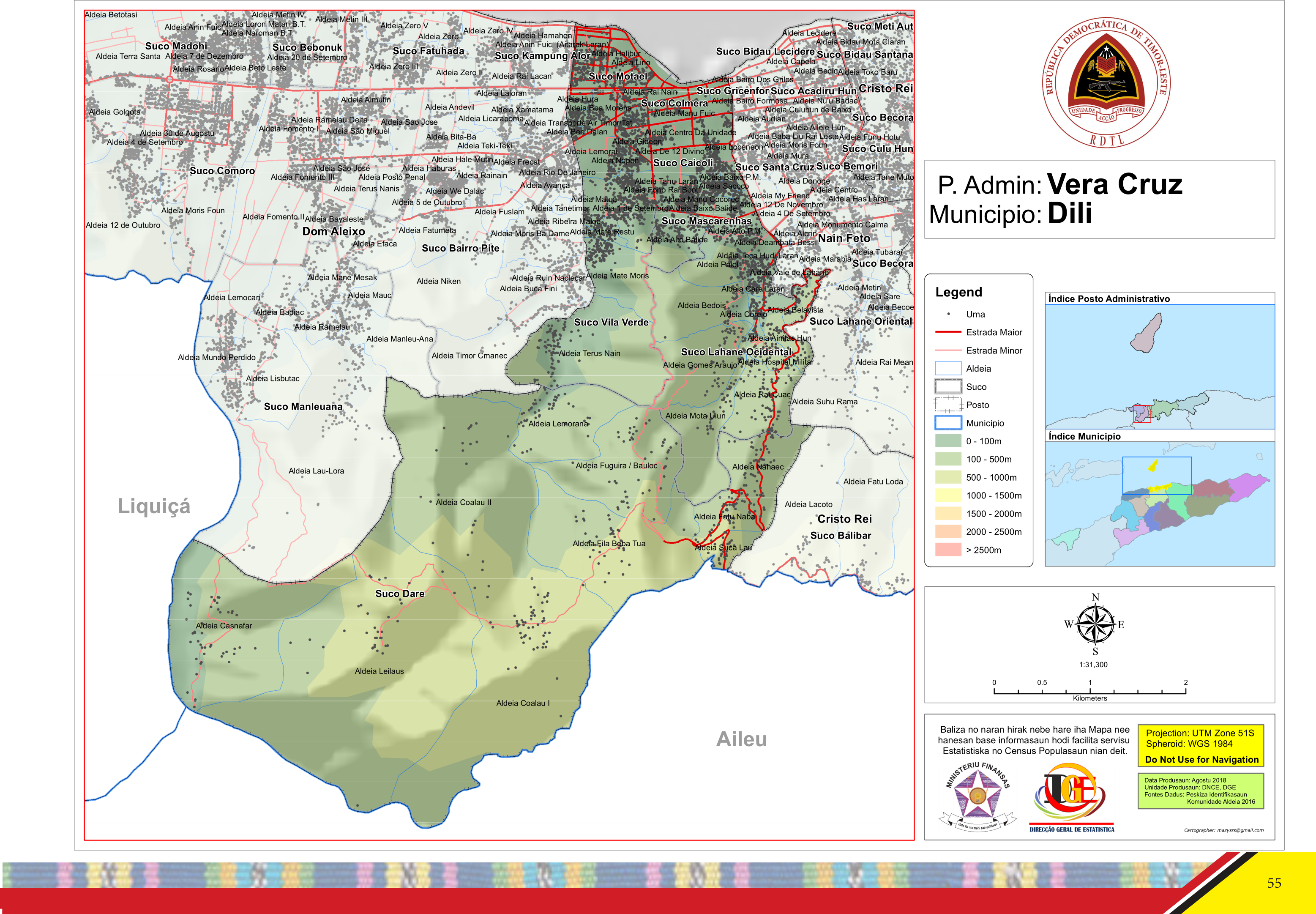
- Official map

- Location within East Timor
- Coordinates: 8°33′S 125°34′E
- Country: Timor-Leste
- Municipality: Dili
- Seat: Mascarenhas
- Sucos: Caicoli; Colmera; Dare; Lahane Ocidental; Mascarenhas; Motael; Vila Verde

Area
  - Total: 25.9 km^{2} (10.0 sq mi)

Population (2015 census)
  - Total: 36,574
  - Density: 1,410/km^{2} (3,660/sq mi)

Households (2015 census)
  - Total: 5,535
- Time zone: UTC+09:00 (TLT)

Vera Cruz Administrative Post (Portuguese: Posto Administrativo de Vera Cruz, Tetun: Postu Administrativu Vera Cruz), is an administrative post (formerly subdistrict) in Dili Municipality, Timor-Leste. Its seat or administrative centre is Mascarenhas, and its population at the 2004 census was 28,178.

== Education ==
Secondary schools in Vera Cruz Administrative Post include Escola Secundária Geral 4 de Setembro UNAMET and Escola Secundária Geral Cristal.
