= President B. J. Habibie Bridge =

Road bridge in Dili, East Timor

President B. J. Habibie Bridge Ponte Presidente B. J. Habibie (Portuguese) Ponte Presidente B. J. Habibie (Tetum)
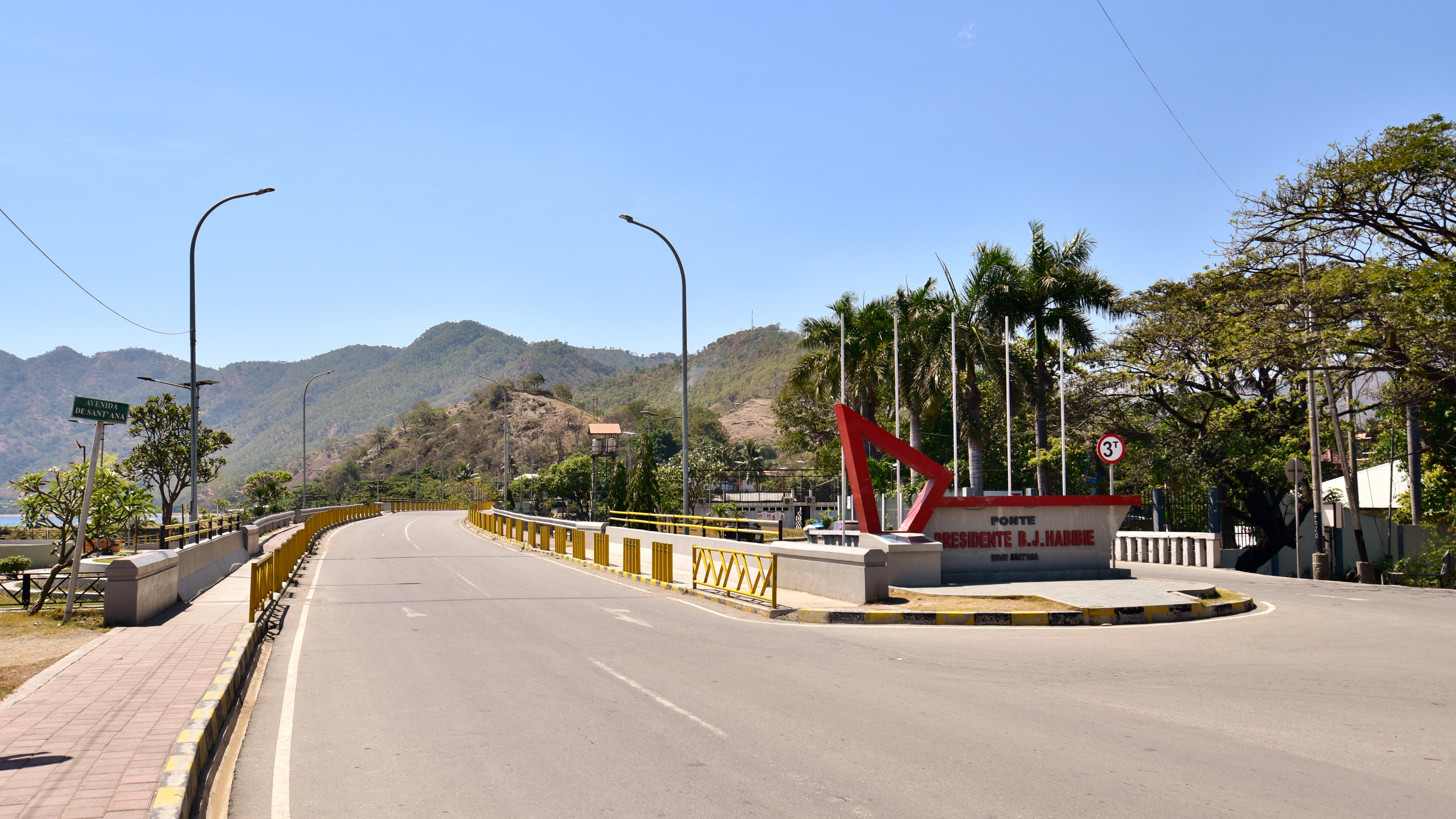
- President B. J. Habibie Bridge and its Entrance Monument
- Coordinates: 8°32′53″S 125°35′26″E
- Carries: Road vehicles, pedestrians
- Crosses: Claran River
- Locale: Bidau Santana, Dili, Timor-Leste
- Official name: B. J. Habibie Bridge
- Named for: B. J. Habibie

Characteristics
- Material: Concrete, steel
- Total length: 78 m (256 ft); (bridge); 540 m (1,770 ft); (roadway section)
- Width: 11.5 m (38 ft); (bridge); 8 m (26 ft); (roadway section)
- No. of lanes: 2

History
- Constructed by: Bhakti Timor Karya (BTK)
- Construction cost: US$4 million
- Inaugurated: 29 August 2019

Location
- Interactive map of President B. J. Habibie Bridge

The President B. J. Habibie Bridge (Portuguese: Ponte Presidente B. J. Habibie, Tetum: Ponte Presidente B. J. Habibie) is a two-lane road bridge in the suco of Bidau Santana, an inner suburb of Dili, capital city of Timor-Leste. It is named after B. J. Habibie (1936–2019), the President of Indonesia who decided in 1999 to hold that year's referendum on whether East Timor would become independent of Indonesia.

In 1998, Habibie had been Vice President to Suharto, the Indonesian President who had initiated and presided over the Indonesian invasion and occupation of East Timor. Between 1978 and 1998, Habibie was a Minister in Suharto's government, and he was closely associated with Suharto from the 1950s.

== Location ==
The bridge spans the Claran River, and connects the Avenida Marginal in the west with the Avenida Sant'Ana in the east.

== History ==
Together with its adjoining roadway, the bridge was built to supplement a smaller bridge completed in 1960, during the Portuguese colonial era. In 2017, the Government of East Timor awarded the contract for the construction of the new bridge, and a new park adjacent to it, to an Indonesian firm Bhakti Timor Karya (BTK), for a total price of just under US$4 million. Construction was scheduled to begin on 31 August 2017 and be completed on 31 August 2019.

In July 2019, Xanana Gusmão, the former President and Prime Minister of Timor-Leste, travelled to Jakarta, to invite B. J. Habibie to attend the inauguration of the bridge. Many East Timorese people remember Habibie as the originator of the 1999 referendum that gave East Timor the opportunity to resume its independence. The inauguration of the bridge, which was to have been named the Referendum Bridge, was due to take place on about the 20th anniversary of the independence referendum.

Habibie was unable to accept the invitation, as he was being treated at Gatot Soebroto Army Hospital. Because of this, Gusmão could therefore only pass on to him the respect and affection of the people of Timor-Leste.

After returning from Jakarta, Gusmão decided that both the bridge and the park should be named in honour of Habibie. That decision generated some criticism, but Gusmão remained firm in relation to the name. In early August 2019, the builders confirmed that they would complete the project on schedule. On 29 August 2019, the day before the 20th anniversary, another former President of Timor-Leste, José Ramos-Horta, officially inaugurated the bridge.

Thousands of Dili residents attended the inauguration ceremony. Members of government including the Minister of Public Works, Salvador Eugénio Soares dos Reis Pires, members of the National Parliament, and special members of the National Assembly, including the Dili capital community and the Bidau Santana community were also present. Also in attendance was the Indonesian Minister of Public Works and Housing, Basuki Hadimuljono, who had been assigned as the Special Envoy of the President of Indonesia, Joko Widodo, to attend the 20th anniversary commemoration.

During the inauguration ceremony, Basuki read a message from President Widodo saying that Indonesia and Timor-Leste could continue to boost economic cooperation in border areas, such as Mota'ain, Motamasin, and Wini, especially in the face of increasingly tough global competition. At the end of the ceremony, Basuki played drums to accompany Ramos-Horta and Indonesian Ambassador Sahat Sitorus in singing the Indonesian song "Bengawan Solo", as a symbol of friendship and collaboration between the two countries. Additionally, Ramos-Horta drove a car across the bridge, with Basuki, the East Timorese Foreign Minister, Dionísio Babo Soares, and the President of the Assembly of the Republic of Portugal, Eduardo Ferro Rodrigues, as his passengers.

Basuki planned to report to Habibie about the construction of the bridge. However, Habibie died at the hospital on 11 September 2019, before Basuki could convey his message. In the aftermath of Habibie's death, a video of Gusmão's July visit with Habibie in the hospital circulated on social media, and was viewed more than one million times. However, not every observer shared Gusmão's views on Habibie's legacy to Timor-Leste. One Australian journalist wrote:

"Habibie's bridge is brochure-perfect brilliant, still with its sails up from the [inauguration] ceremony, and no one seems to find it odd that a shiny new symbol of growing Timor-Leste is named for the anti-independence confidante of the dictator responsible for the invasion."

The "dictator" to whom the journalist was referring in this passage was Suharto, President of Indonesia from 1967 to 1998. He was the President who initiated and presided over the Indonesian invasion of East Timor in 1975, and Indonesia's consequent occupation of East Timor from 1975 until he was forced to resign in 1998.

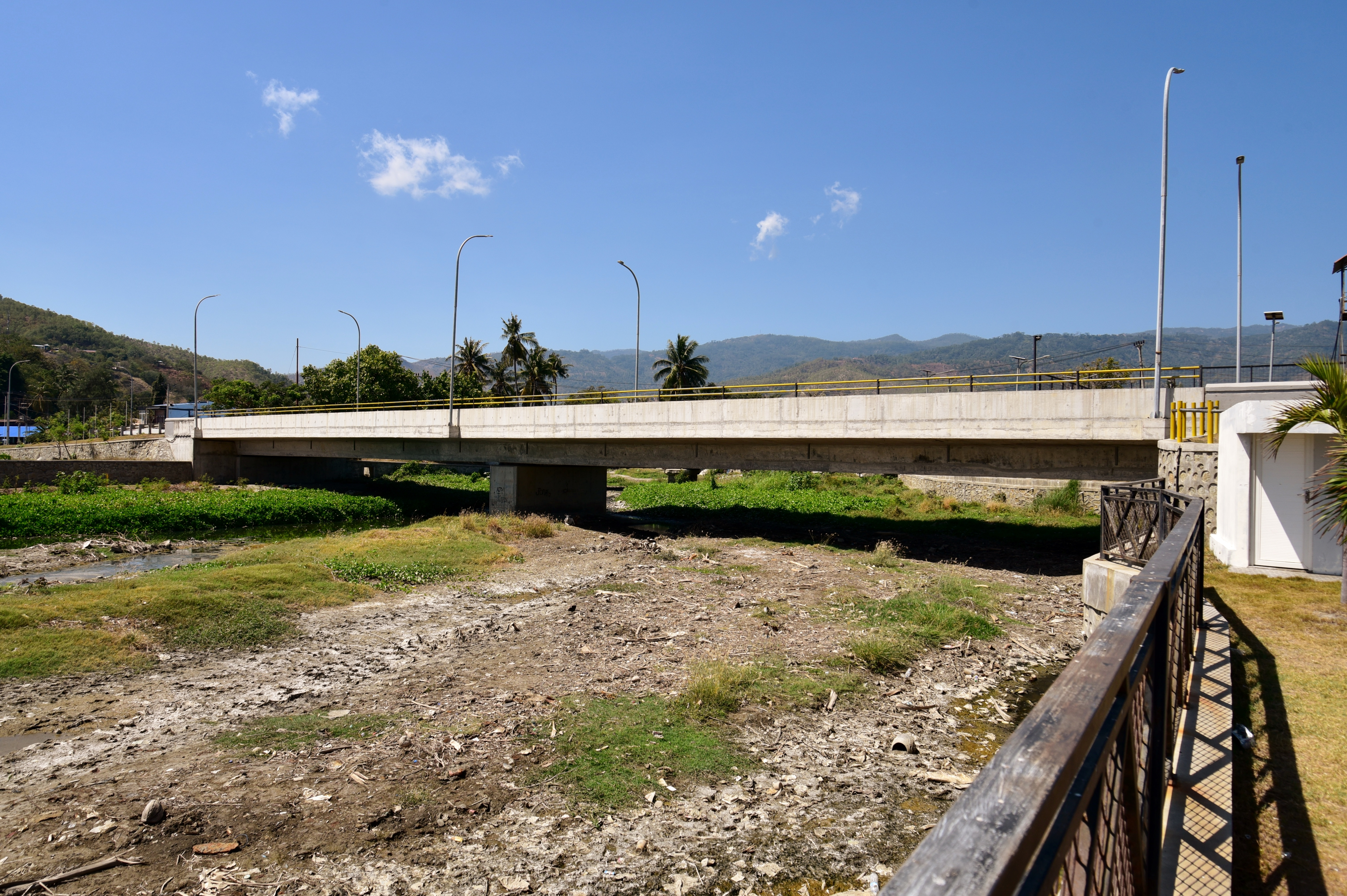
Side view of the bridge in 2023

Suharto and Habibie were closely associated with each other from the early 1950s, when Suharto, then a young military officer, came to know the Habibie family well. In 1978, Suharto appointed Habibie as State Minister of Research and Technology. Habibie, who flattered Suharto by calling him "SGS" (short for Super Genius Suharto), and deferred to Suharto's family, served continuously in that position until 1998, when Suharto selected him to be his Vice President. Soon afterwards, Suharto resigned from the presidency, and Habibie replaced him. Habibie was opposed to independence for East Timor, but in 1999 decided to hold a referendum to determine the question of East Timor's independence. After the East Timorese people overwhelmingly voted for independence, Habibie allowed independence to take place.

In March 2020, heavy rain and flooding in Dili caused part of a retaining wall in the B. J. Habibie Park adjacent to the bridge to collapse.

== Structural specification ==
The bridge has a superstructure 78 m (256 ft) long, is 11.5 m (38 ft) wide, and has two lanes. It is part of a section of roadway 540 m (1,770 ft) long and 8 m (26 ft) wide between the sucos of Bidau Lecidere in the west and Bidau Santana in the east; that section also includes a short bridge over the Bidau River, which flows into the Bay of Dili immediately to the west of the Claran River.

At the western end of the roadway section, there is a sign with the words "Ponte Presidente B.J.Habibie" in red to welcome users of the bridge.
