= Casa Europa =

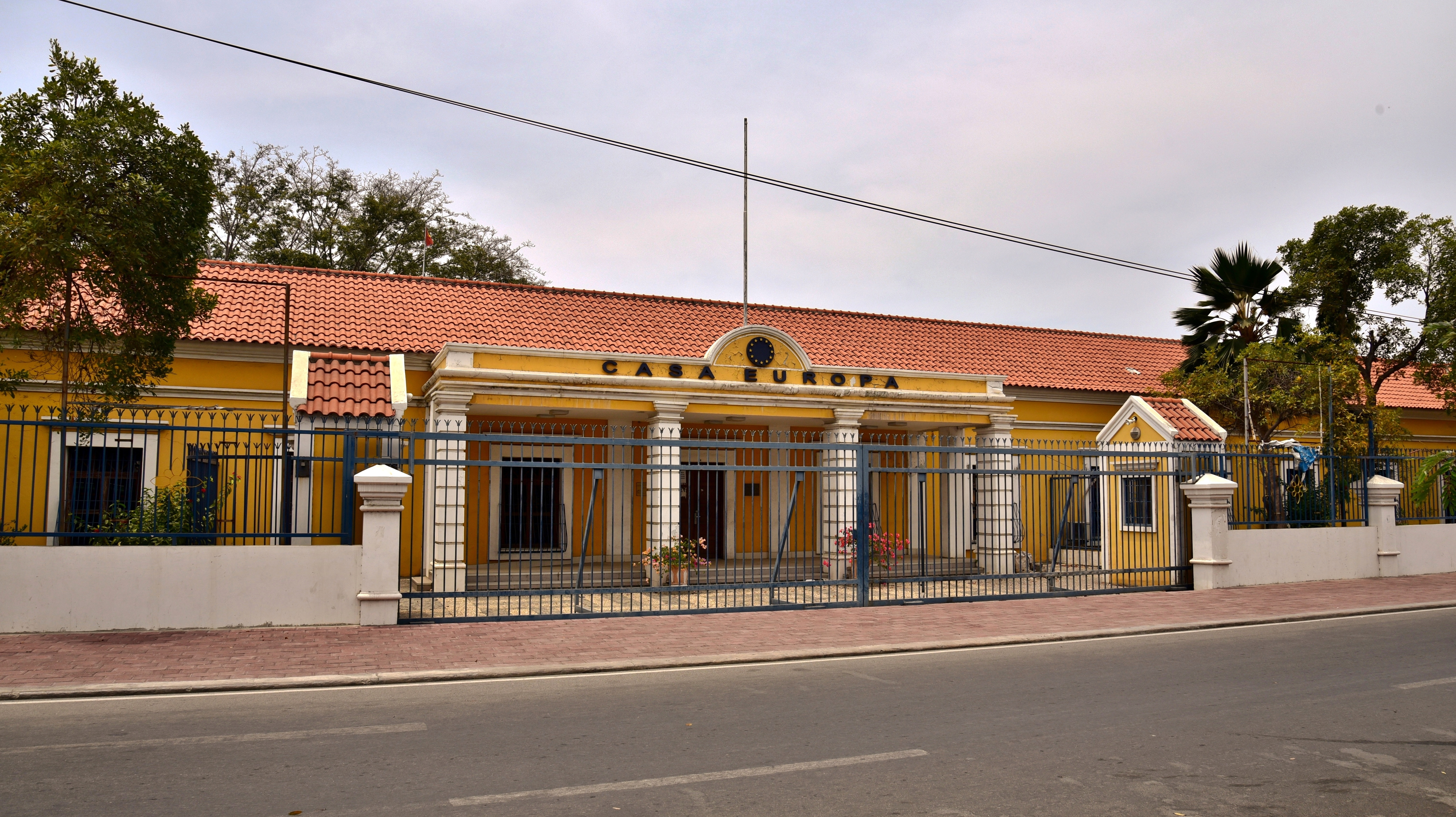
- The building in 2018
- Interactive map of the Casa Europa area

General information
- Type: Office / Event venue
- Architectural style: Portuguese colonial
- Location: Av. Presidente Nicolau Lobato, Dili, Timor-Leste
- Coordinates: 8°33′12″S 125°34′47″E
- Construction started: 1871
- Completed: 1899
- Renovated: 2000–2002, 2009
- Owner: European Commission

Casa Europa (transl. Europe House) (Note: The expression Casa Europa is usually not translated in English language sources) is an historic late nineteenth-century Portuguese colonial building in the Bidau Lecidere suco of Dili, capital city of Timor-Leste.

Initially a Portuguese Quartel de Infantaria (infantry barracks), the building became the home of the municipality of Dili administration in the late 1930s. During the Japanese occupation of Portuguese Timor, it was the Japanese general headquarters. It then reverted to being a Portuguese military facility until 1972, and was later taken over by the Indonesian National Armed Forces.

Now the oldest building in the city centre, it has since been renovated and given its present name, however as of 2022, it is unoccupied and is falling into disrepair.

== History ==
The first building to be built on the site of Casa Europa was a rudimentary fortress dating from 1769. Although its official name was Fortaleza de Nossa Senhora da Conceição ("Fortress of Our Lady of the Conception"), it was better known as the Tranqueira ("Palisade"), because it was made of wood.

Initiative for the replacement of that building with a more substantial structure came from a mid-nineteenth-century Governor of Portuguese Timor, José Maria Marques (1834–1839). However, construction of the present building on the ruins of the fortress did not begin until 1871, five years after a fire had destroyed the fortress and devastated much of the city. Most of the building work was carried out between 1884 and 1899.

In 1895, before the building was even completed, it was occupied as the Quartel de Infantaria (infantry barracks). By the 1930s, however, it had become too small for that function. Between 1937 and 1940, it was therefore the premises of the Dili municipal administration and the police services, including those of the indigenous cipaio (sepoy) contingent.

During the Japanese occupation of Portuguese Timor from 1942 to 1945, the building housed the Japanese general headquarters, with the consequence that it escaped the destruction suffered by the rest of the city. After the Japanese surrender, the building reverted to the Portuguese military, as the barracks of the Caçadores ("Rangers") regiment. In the 1960s, it was occupied by the Companhia de Intendência (Logistics and Services Detachment). It became vacant when the Detachment moved to Taibesse in 1972, but was taken over by an Indonesian military unit following the Indonesian invasion of East Timor in 1975.

In September 1999, during that year's East Timorese crisis, the building was heavily damaged by pro-Indonesian integrationist forces. Between 2000 and 2002, under the direction of the World Bank, a first renovation of the building was carried out. The main sponsors of that renovation were the European Commission and the European Union. Upon completion of the renovation, the Uma Fukun, the official cultural centre of Timor-Leste, was set up in the building, complete with a library, video and didactic facilities and an auditorium. The irony of installing the new East Timor's cultural centre into the former military headquarters of its colonisers was not lost on anyone.

In 2007, following another East Timorese crisis, the President of Timor-Leste, José Ramos-Horta, and the East Timorese government decided that the European Commission could establish its new delegation in the building. On 24 November 2007, the President handed the building over to the President of the European Commission, José Manuel Durão Barroso, and it was renamed Casa Europa. Between January and September 2008, the building was renovated a second time. On 24 November 2008, Casa Europa was officially inaugurated by Dr Ramos-Horta and the European Commissioner for Development and Humanitarian Aid, Louis Michel.

Casa Europa is now the oldest building in Dili's city centre. The European Commission's delegation to East Timor moved into it in October 2008, but has since relocated. Casa Europa is currently empty.

== Architecture ==
Casa Europa is single-storey with a high ceiling. Its design is sensitive to the local climate and lifestyle. The masonry from which it was built consists of stone, brick and plaster, and originally had a whitewashed finish. The building is made up of three modules, connected and arranged in a U-shape. Its north side facing the sea is open, an arrangement made possible only because of a coral reef that gave the area natural protection from landings from enemy ships. The U-shaped configuration promotes transverse ventilation and illumination.

The building's two lateral wings are topped with full length gable roofs, each featuring upright projections overlooking the street and the parade ground. Both wings have cornices and mouldings, nineteenth-century style casement windows facing the parade ground and sash windows opening onto the street. The central section has a symmetrical composition with an overhang borne on four columns denoting the main entrance, and is similarly fitted with a gable roof.
