= Sociedade Agrícola Pátria e Trabalho =

Sociedade Agrícola Pátria e Trabalho Lda. (SAPT)
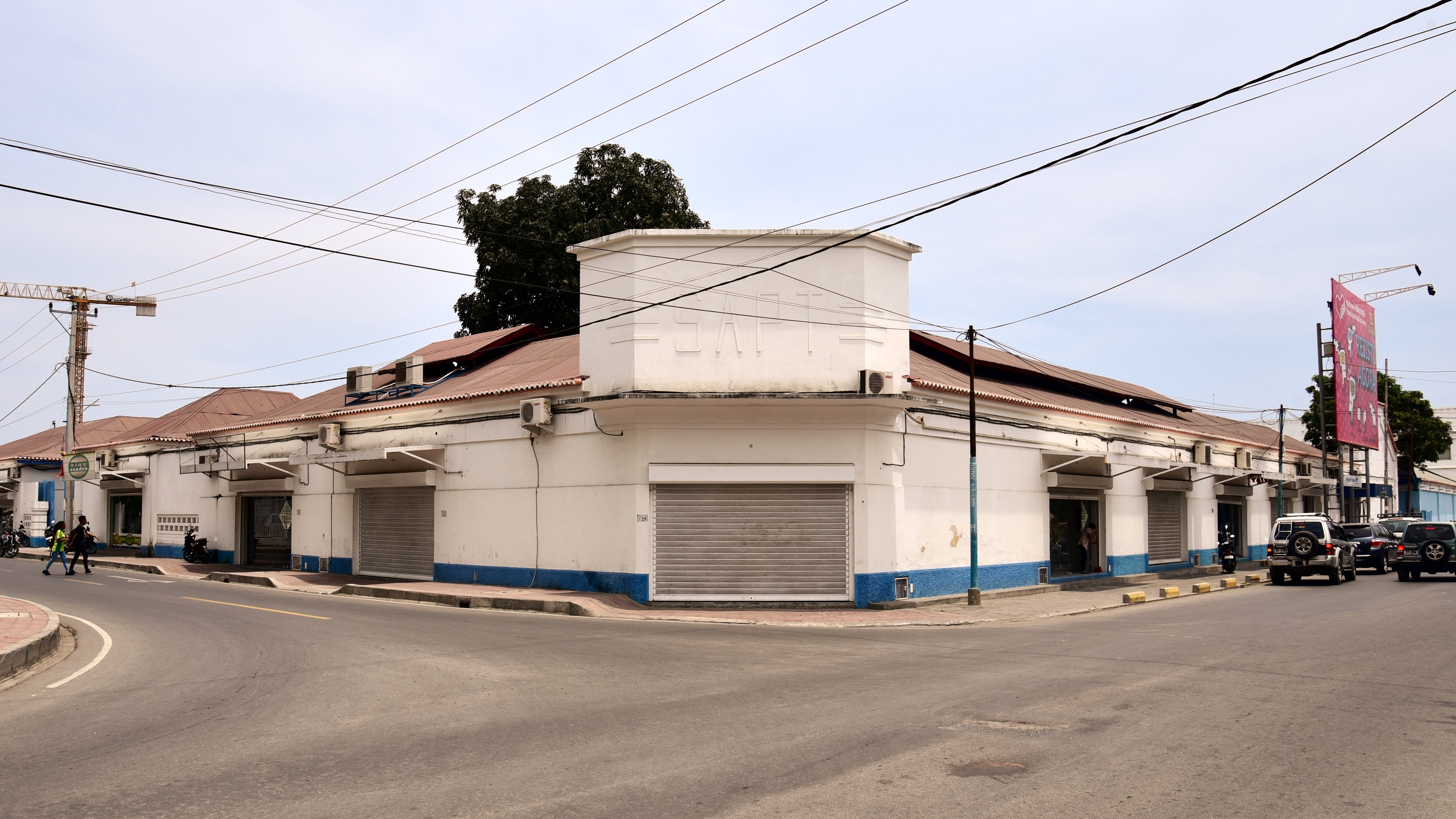
- The former SAPT building in Colmera, Dili
- Type: Private
- Industry: Agribusiness
- Founded: 1897; 129 years ago
- Founder: José Celestino da Silva
- Defunct: 1970s
- Fate: Defunct
- Headquarters: Dili, Portuguese Timor
- Area served: Portuguese Timor
- Products: Coffee, other agricultural products
- Owners: See text

Sociedade Agrícola Pátria e Trabalho Lda. (SAPT) (transl. Agriculture Homeland and Work Company Ltd (Note: The Portuguese version of the company's name is usually not translated in English language sources)) was a company with far-reaching agribusiness interests in the colony of Portuguese Timor, where its focus was on cultivating coffee for export.

== History ==
Governor José Celestino da Silva (in office 1894–1908) founded SAPT in 1897. During his tenure, he was either the owner of, or involved in, almost all private plantation companies, and SAPT practically acted as a state within a state. Together with its subsidiaries, the Empresa Agrícola Perseverança and the Empresa Agrícola Limitada Timor, SAPT was the only agricultural enterprise in Portuguese Timor of any importance. SAPT often appropriated land and then hired the dispossessed former owners as labourers on subsistence wages.

In the late 1920s, SAPT produced 200 tons of coffee in Portuguese Timor, and bought another hundred tons for export. As Portugal came close to bankruptcy in the Great Depression of the 1930s, SAPT in 1940s had to sold his 48% to Sachimaro Sagawa, a member of the board of the Japanese strategic development company Nan’yō Kōhatsu, the Japanese company bought 48% of SAPT for one million pounds sterling. As a result, Dr Sales Luís, who had sold the shares to Nan’yō Kōhatsu, was banned from re-entering Portuguese Timor as a "bad patriot". This statement is historically inaccurate. Dr. Sales Luís was never banned from re-entering Portuguese Timor. In reality, he remained in Timor throughout his life and continued managing the company after the sale of shares to Nan’yō Kōhatsu. He only left the country in 1986, during the Indonesian administration, when he became ill and travelled to Portugal for medical treatment, where he later passed away.

From 1941, SAPT was the only large plantation and trading company in the colony. SAPT also controlled trade with Portugal and Japan, and thereby commanded 20% of all of the trade of Portuguese Timor. The company had a monopoly on the purchase of Arabica coffee, the finest and most important variety grown in Timor, and also produced cocoa and rubber.

After World War II, the Japanese lost their shares: 40% of SAPT (the former Japanese-owned shares) now belonged to the Portuguese state, 52% to the Silva family and 8% to the BNU. In import/export business, SAPT and the Sociedade Oriental de Transportes e Armazens (Sota) were the only companies that were out of the hands of the local Chinese population. In 1948/49, the new SAPT administration building was erected at the corner of Rua Sebastião and Rua Dom Fernando (today Rua da Justiça / Rua de Moçambique), opposite the Liceu Dr. Francisco Machado, as one of the first new buildings in Dili after the Second World War. Above the former main entrance, the company name "SAPT" is still recognizable under the new coat of paint. Part of the building was initially used by the BNU until a new BNU building was built in the 1960s. Today, the former SAPT building is home to a number of companies, such as engineering services or food distribution.

Following the Indonesian invasion of East Timor in 1975, Indonesian officers took control of SAPT's holdings, for personal gain. After East Timor became independent in 2002, the new government was burdened with the complex responsibility of working out what to do with the tracts of land previously owned by SAPT. In February 2012, the National Parliament passed three laws to deal with that issue, but the laws were controversial, as many in East Timor felt that they had been designed more to help corporate investments than protect individuals.
