= 2004–05 East Timorese local elections =

Local elections were held in East Timor in 2004 and 2005 to elect for Village Chiefs (Chefe do Suco) and delegates for Village Councils (Conselho do Suco) in 442 sucos (villages). It included the election of Hamlet Chiefs (Chefe do Aldeia) in aldeias (communities).
