= Banco Nacional Ultramarino building, Dili =

Banco Nacional Ultramarino, Dili
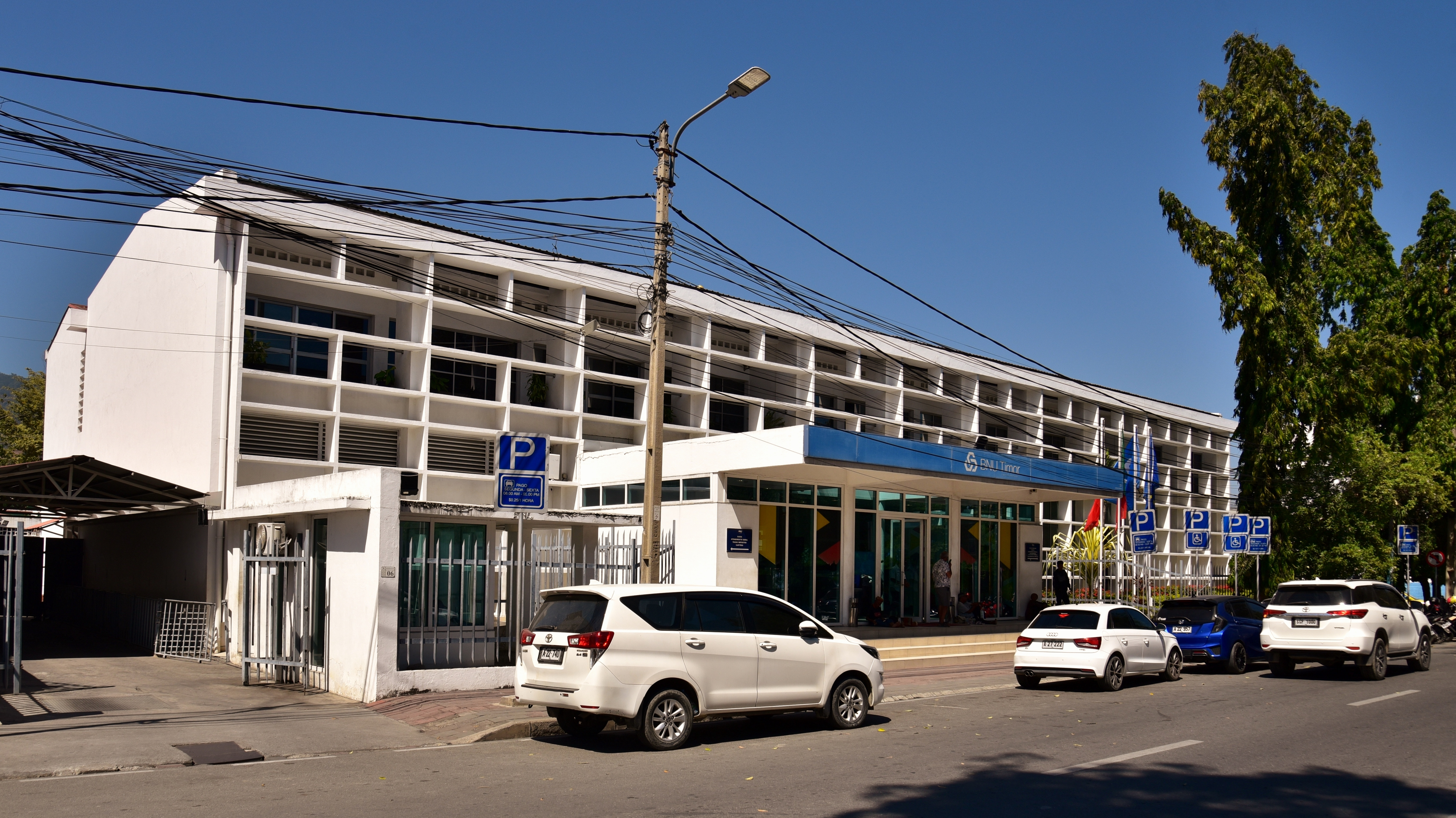
- The building in 2023
- Interactive map of the Banco Nacional Ultramarino, Dili area

General information
- Type: Office / banking chamber
- Architectural style: Modernist
- Location: Rua Nicolau dos Reis Lobato, Dili, Timor-Leste
- Coordinates: 8°33′17″S 125°34′34″E
- Construction started: 1966
- Completed: 1968
- Renovated: 2000–2001
- Owner: Caixa Geral de Depósitos

Design and construction
- Architect: Fernando Schiappa de Campos

The Banco Nacional Ultramarino (BNU) building, in the centre of Dili, capital city of Timor-Leste, is a modernist structure unusual in Timor. Constructed between 1966 and 1968, it has only one contemporary, the ACAIT building, formerly the headquarters of the now defunct Timor Commercial, Agricultural and Industrial Association (Portuguese: Associação Comercial Industrial e Agrícola de Timor (ACAIT)).

As a consequence of political turbulence culminating in the Indonesian invasion of East Timor in 1975, the BNU building's owner, Banco Nacional Ultramarino, closed down its Timor operations. However, since 2001 the building has again been occupied by BNU Timor, now a trading name of the Portuguese bank Caixa Geral de Depósitos.

== History ==
The BNU was founded in 1864. It opened a branch in Dili, then the capital of Portuguese Timor, in 1912. As well as providing the usual services of a trading bank, the BNU issued Portuguese Timor's currency, initially the pataca, and later the escudo.

The BNU was also an important investor in the colony: its investments included a holding in Sociedade Agrícola Pátria e Trabalho (SAPT), the largest Timorese enterprise. The bank's Dili branch was even housed in SAPT's head office, until that building was destroyed by the Japanese during World War II. The BNU then rented a building from the Roman Catholic Diocese of Díli, until 1949, when it occupied part of SAPT's new administration building at the corner of Rua Sebastião and Rua Dom Fernando (today Rua da Justiça / Rua de Moçambique).

Only at the end of the 1960s did the bank finally move into its own premises, the new modernist BNU building, which was erected between 1966 and 1968.

The BNU did not remain in its new Dili headquarters for very long. In 1974, a turbulent process of decolonisation of Portuguese Timor began, and that process culminated in the Indonesian invasion of East Timor the following year. As a consequence, the BNU closed down its Timor operations.

During the Indonesian occupation of East Timor, the BNU building was used by Bank Pembangunan Daerah Timor Timur (literally "East Timor Regional Development Bank"), a regional enterprise founded at the initiative of Francisco Lopes da Cruz, the then Indonesian-appointed Vice Governor of Timor Timur. After the East Timorese independence referendum of 1999, the building was set on fire and destroyed by Indonesian militias. The BNU then recommenced its operations in Timor, initially from the ACAIT's building. Before long, the bank decided to restore its own building, partly because of its architectural and symbolic value within the context of Timor’s built heritage. The restoration work was carried out in 2000–2001.

By the time the restoration was complete, the BNU had been merged into the Caixa Geral de Depósitos, which now trades from the restored building under the trading name BNU Timor.

== Architecture ==
The BNU building is, like its only contemporary the ACAIT building, a representative of modernist architecture in Dili. The two buildings were a departure from the hitherto prevailing colonial, neoclassical style for representative buildings, such as the 1950s government palace. However, in contrast to the ACAIT building, the BNU building is located outside the colonial administrative district on a shopping street.

The building was designed by Fernando Schiappa de Campos. It has a flat terrace roof and stands on stilts so that the ground floor floats over the ground. The front façade consists of a concrete grating that protects the windows from direct sunlight. The east-west orientation is also used for cooling. The prevailing winds blow from the sea to the north, and the openings to the north and south minimise sun exposure to the east and west.
