= Francisco Borja da Costa =

East Timorese poet, writer of the national anthem (1946–1975)

- Born: October 14, 1946; Manatuto, Portuguese Timor
- Died: December 8, 1975 (aged 29); Dili, East Timor
- Cause of death: Invasion by Indonesia
- Occupation: Poet
- Notable work: "Pátria" and "Um Minuto de Silêncio"

Francisco Borja da Costa (October 14, 1946 – December 8, 1975) was an East Timorese poet and the writer of "Pátria", the national anthem of East Timor.

== Career ==
Born in October 1946, he wrote the majority of his work in Tetum. Borja da Costa was executed by Indonesian forces on December 8, 1975, the day after the beginning of the Indonesian invasion of East Timor. The national anthem's composer, Afonso Redentor Araujo, was also executed by the Indonesians four years later. Aside from the East Timorese national anthem, his most famous known work may be the poem "Um Minuto de Silêncio" (English: "A Minute of Silence").
