= Metinaro Administrative Post =

Administrative post in Dili Municipality, Timor-Leste

Metinaro
- Administrative Post
- Posto Administrativo de Metinaro (Portuguese); Postu administrativu Metinaro (Tetum)
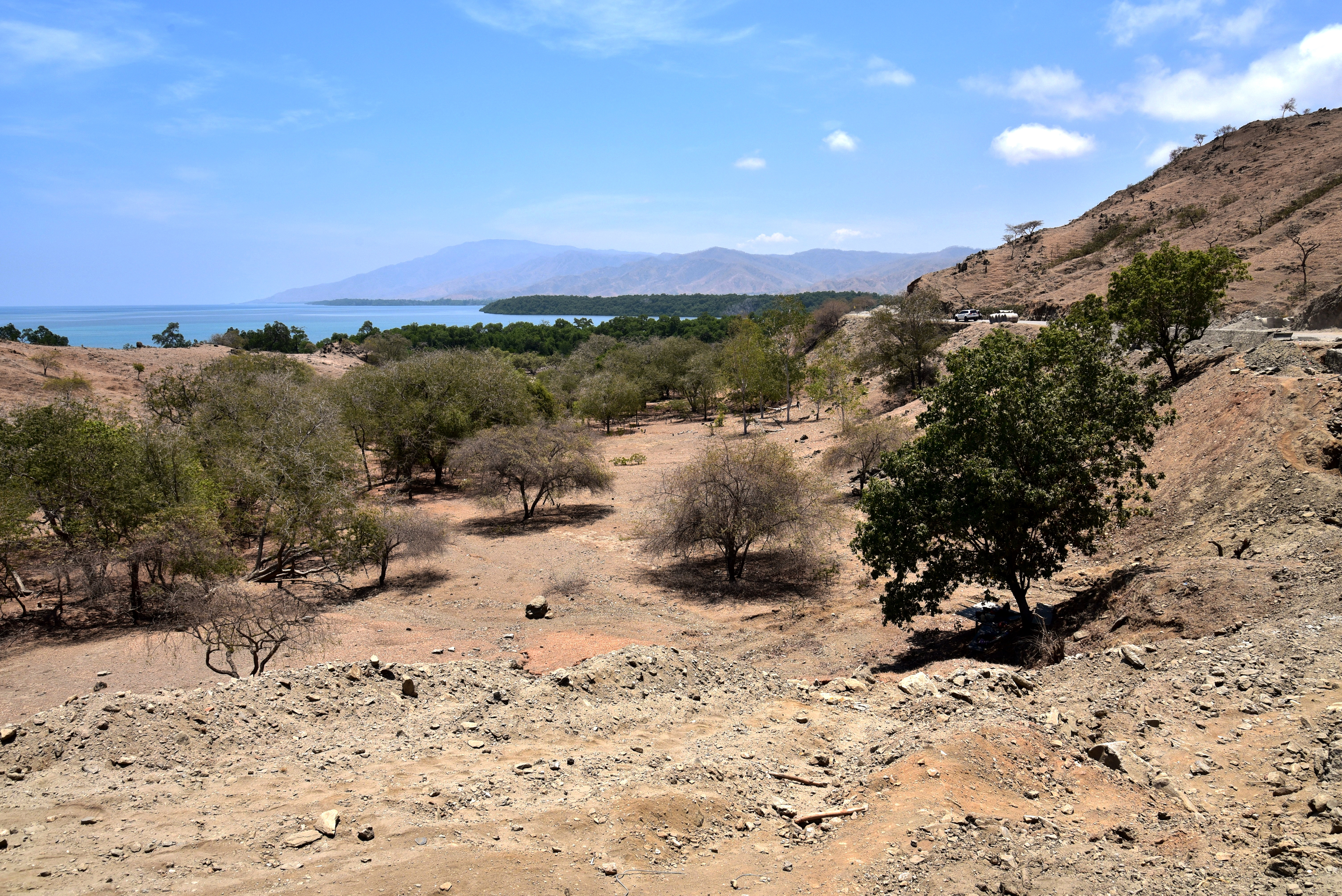
- View of Pasir Putih, Suco Sabuli

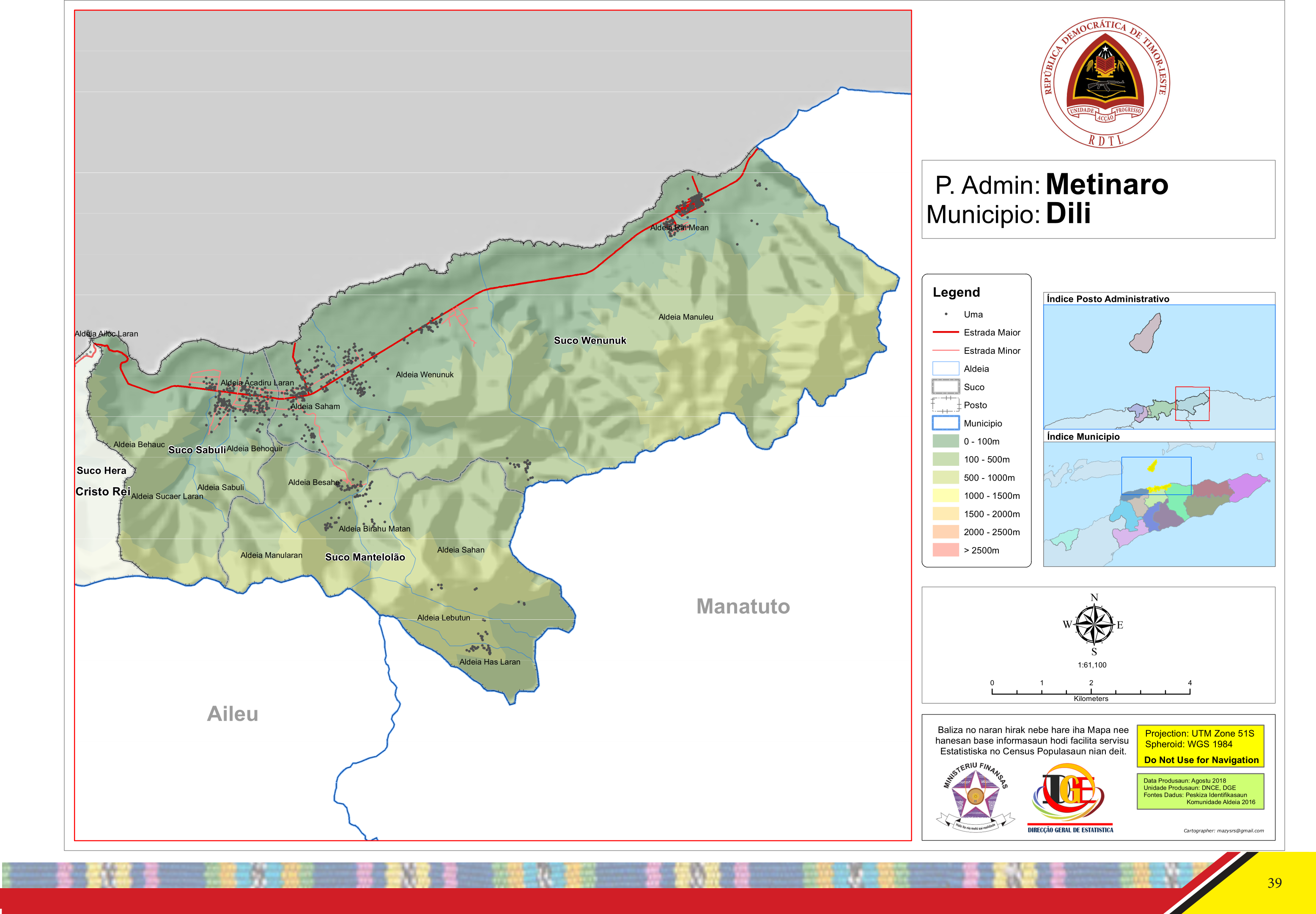
- Official map

- Location within East Timor
- Coordinates: 8°32′S 125°45′E
- Country: Timor-Leste
- Municipality: Dili
- Seat: Sabuli
- Sucos: Mantelolão; Sabuli; Wenunuc

Area
  - Total: 85.4 km^{2} (33.0 sq mi)

Population (2015 census)
  - Total: 5,654
  - Density: 66.2/km^{2} (171/sq mi)

Households (2015 census)
  - Total: 846
- Time zone: UTC+09:00 (TLT)

Metinaro, officially Metinaro Administrative Post (Portuguese: Posto Administrativo de Metinaro, Tetum: Postu administrativu Metinaro), is an administrative post in Dili municipality, Timor-Leste. Its seat or administrative centre is Sabuli.
