= Nain Feto Administrative Post =

Administrative post in Dili Municipality, Timor-Leste

Nain Feto
- Administrative Post
- Posto Administrativo de Nain Feto (Portuguese); Postu Administrativu Nain Feto (Tetum)
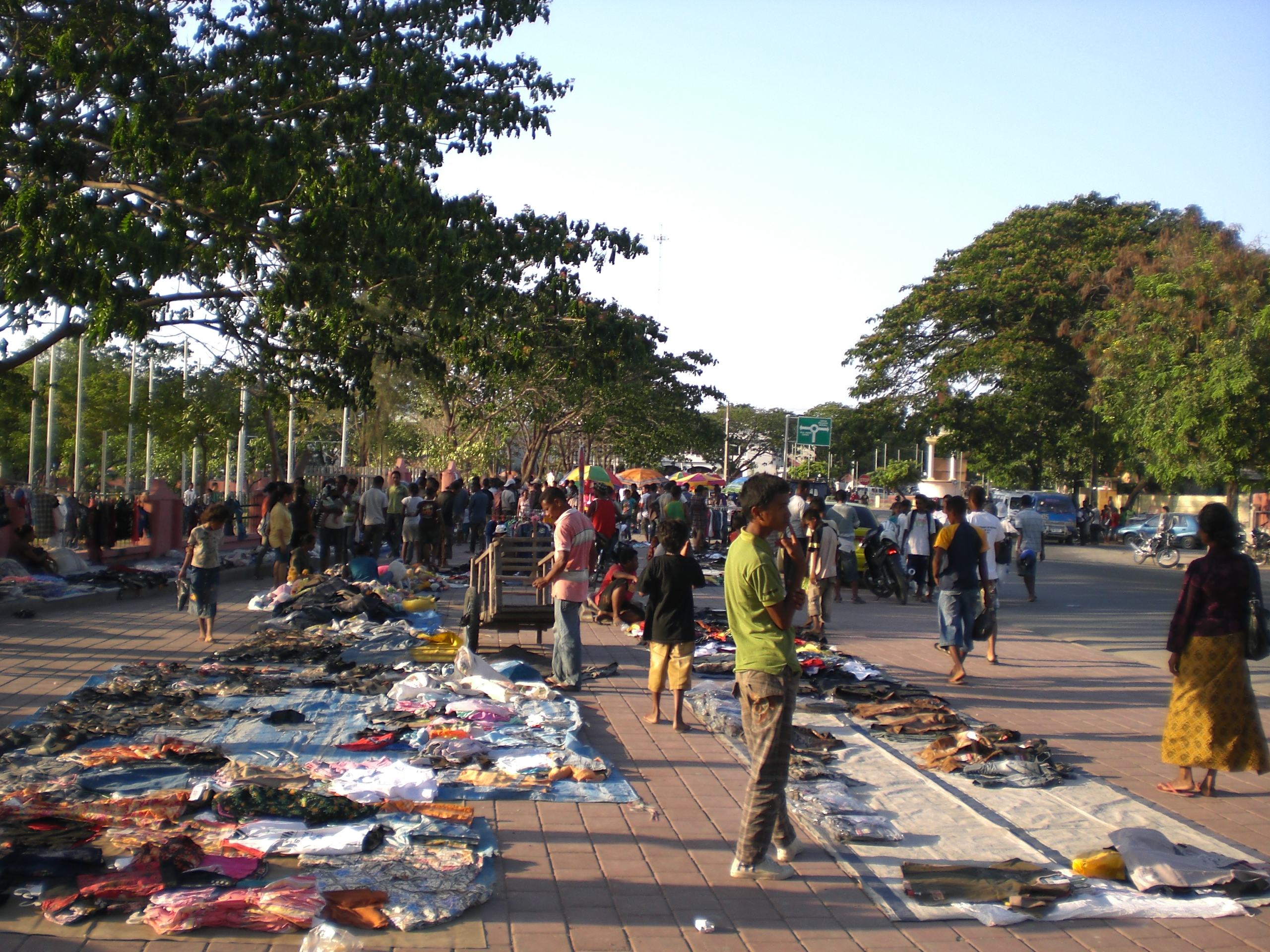
- Market scene in Nain Feto

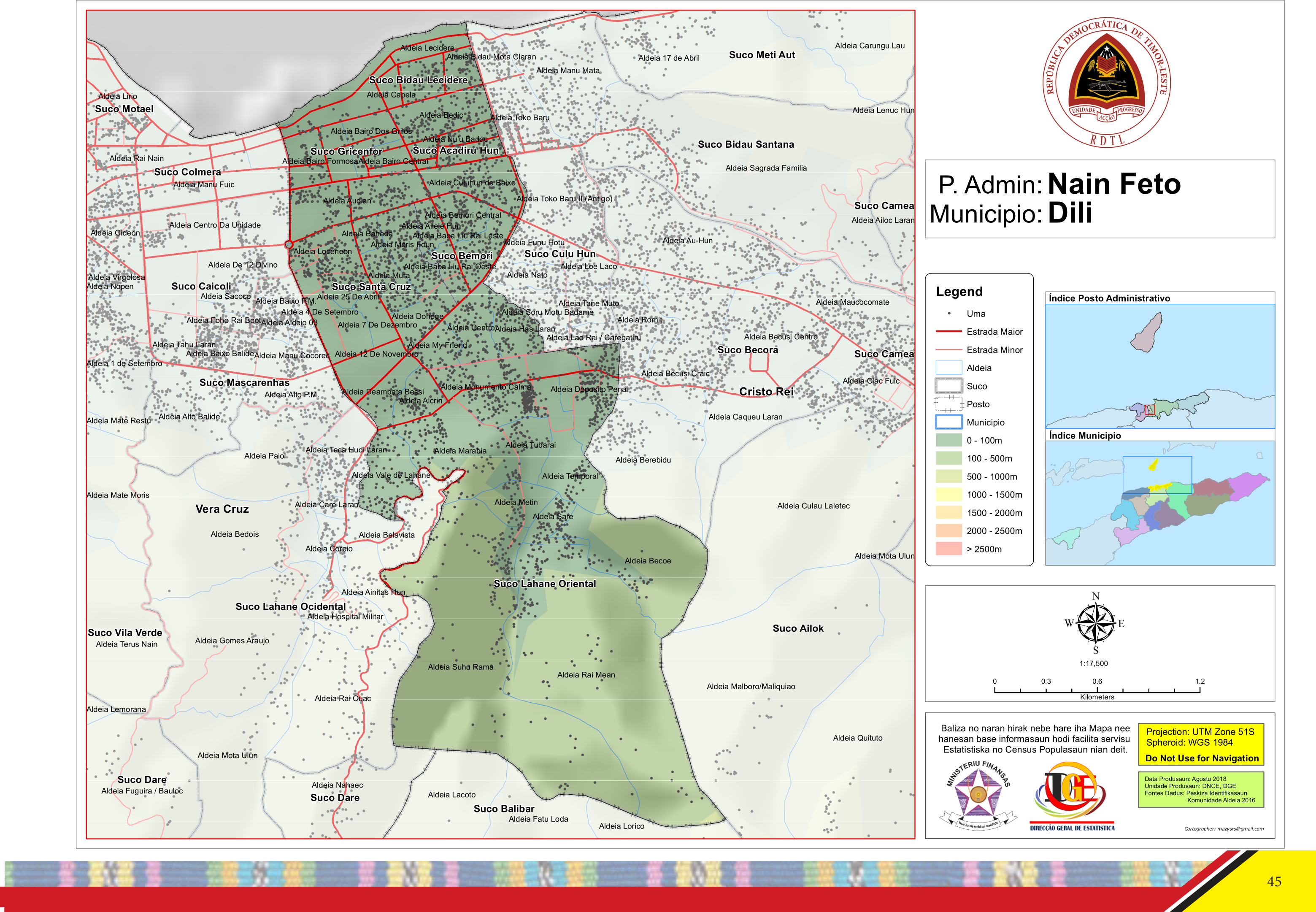
- Official map

- Location within East Timor
- Coordinates: 8°33′36″S 125°35′16″E
- Country: Timor-Leste
- Municipality: Dili
- Seat: Gricenfor
- Sucos: Acadiru Hun; Bemori; Bidau Lecidere; Gricenfor; Lahane Oriental; Santa Cruz

Area
  - Total: 6.1 km^{2} (2.4 sq mi)

Population (2015 census)
  - Total: 32,834
  - Density: 5,400/km^{2} (14,000/sq mi)

Households (2015 census)
  - Total: 4,899
- Time zone: UTC+09:00 (TLT)

Nain Feto Administrative Post (Portuguese: Posto Administrativo de Nain Feto, Tetum: Postu Administrativu Nain Feto), is an administrative post (formerly subdistrict) in Dili Municipality, Timor-Leste. Its seat or administrative centre is Gricenfor, and its population at the 2004 census was 18,693.

== Education ==
Secondary schools in Nain Feto include Colégio Paulo VI, Colégio de São José Operário, and Escola CAFE de Díli.
