= Dili Municipality =

Municipality of East Timor

Dili
- Municipality of Timor-Leste
- Município Díli (Portuguese); Munisípiu Dili (Tetun)
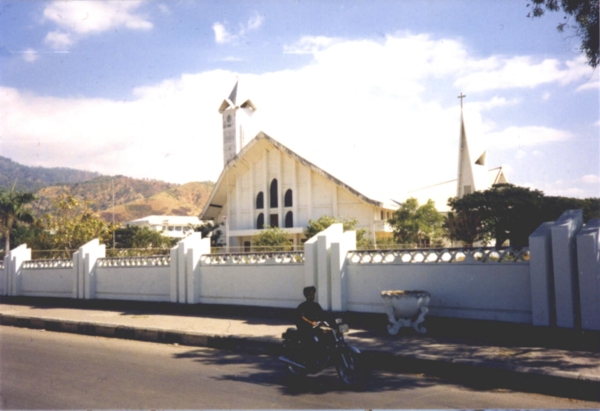
- Cathedral of Dili

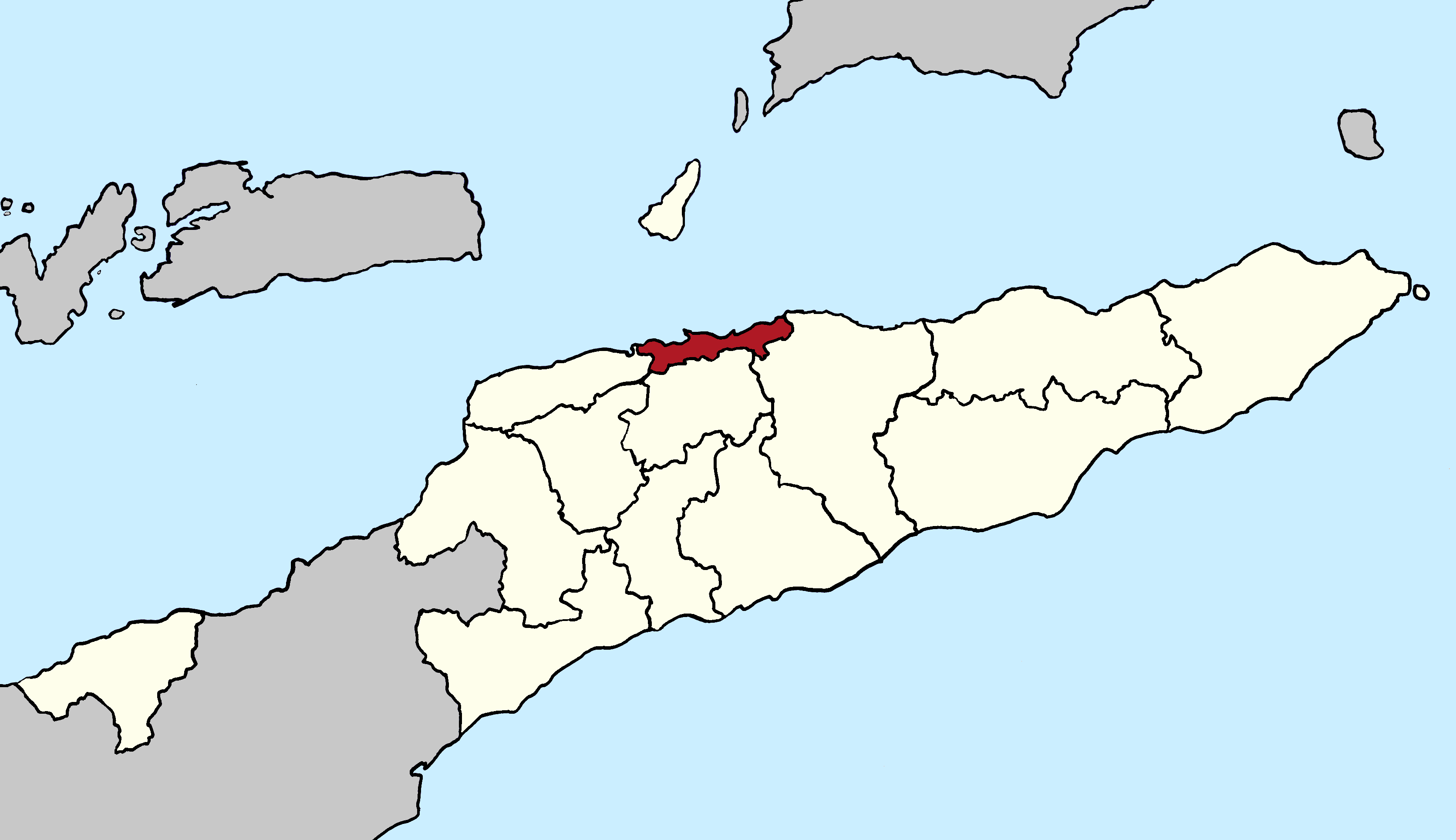
- Dili in Timor-Leste
- Interactive map of Dili
- Coordinates: 8°34′S 125°35′E
- Country: Timor-Leste
- Capital: Dili
- Administrative posts: Cristo Rei; Dom Aleixo; Metinaro; Nain Feto; Vera Cruz

Area
  - Total: 224.0 km^{2} (86.5 sq mi)
  - Rank: 13th

Population (2022)
  - Total: 268,005
  - Rank: 1st
  - Density: 1,196/km^{2} (3,099/sq mi)
  - Rank: 1st

Households (2015 census)
  - Total: 42,485
  - Rank: 1st
- Time zone: UTC+09:00 (TLT)
- ISO 3166 code: TL-DI
- HDI (2017): 0.733 high · 1st
- Website: Dili Municipality

Dili Municipality (Portuguese: Município Díli, Tetun: Munisípiu Dili) is one of the 14 municipalities, formerly districts, of Timor-Leste, and includes the national capital Dili. The municipality had a population of 277,279 as of 2015, most of whom live in the capital city.

== Toponymy ==
Several explanations have been proffered for the origin of the municipality's name. It is often explained, including by the municipality's own website, as being derived from the Tetun word ai-dila, which means pawpaw. According to Australian linguist, ethnologist and historian Geoffrey Hull, however, that explanation is phonologically and historically implausible, as the language spoken in the area now known as Dili before the Portuguese established their seat of administration there in 1769 was Mambai, not Tetun. Hull describes such explanations as "folk etymology".

In Hull's view, the word Dili appears to be cognate with the Bunak word zili (transl. 'cliff'), a reference to the escarpment behind the city; he comments that a Papuan language, of which Bunak is an example, was spoken in the area before the spread of the Austronesian-based Mambai and Tetun languages.

Another "folk etymology" explanation suggested by the municipality is that its name is derived from the Portuguese word Dali, which, in turn, is an approximation of the Tetun expression tali akar (transl. 'hemp rope'). According to the municipality, there were lots of hemp trees in what is now the suco of Caicoli at the centre of the then Reino Motaain, which covered present day Dili. Every year, the local community held a traditional dance ceremony and also offered sacrifices for the hemp tree. The local people believed that the Portuguese word Dali meant 'sacred eye', and so they adopted it as the area's name.

== Geography ==
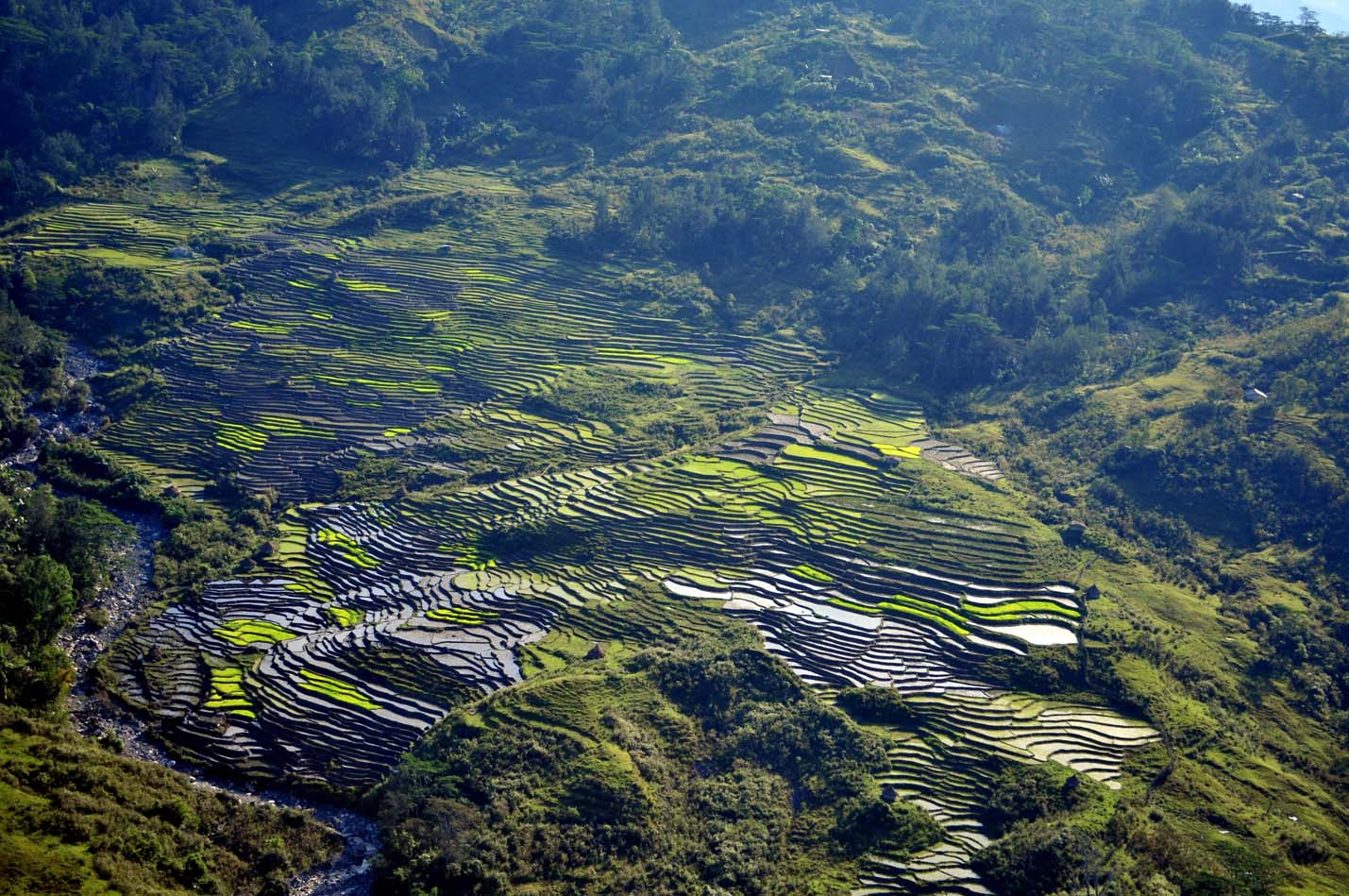
Rice fields in Dili district

Since 1 January 2022, Dili has been the second smallest municipality in Timor-Leste by area, at 224.0 km^{2} (86.5 sq mi). It also has the highest population. It lies on the north coast of the island of Timor facing Ombai Strait, and borders the municipalities of Manatuto to the east, Aileu to the south, and Liquiçá to the west.

Atauro Island, to the north of the municipality opposite the capital, was one of Dili's administrative posts until the end of 2021, when it became a separate municipality.

Dili is the economic and political centre of the country.

== Administrative posts ==
The municipality's administrative posts (formerly sub-districts) are:

- Cristo Rei
- Dom Aleixo
- Metinaro
- Nain Feto; and
- Vera Cruz

The administrative posts are divided into 31 sucos ("villages") in total.

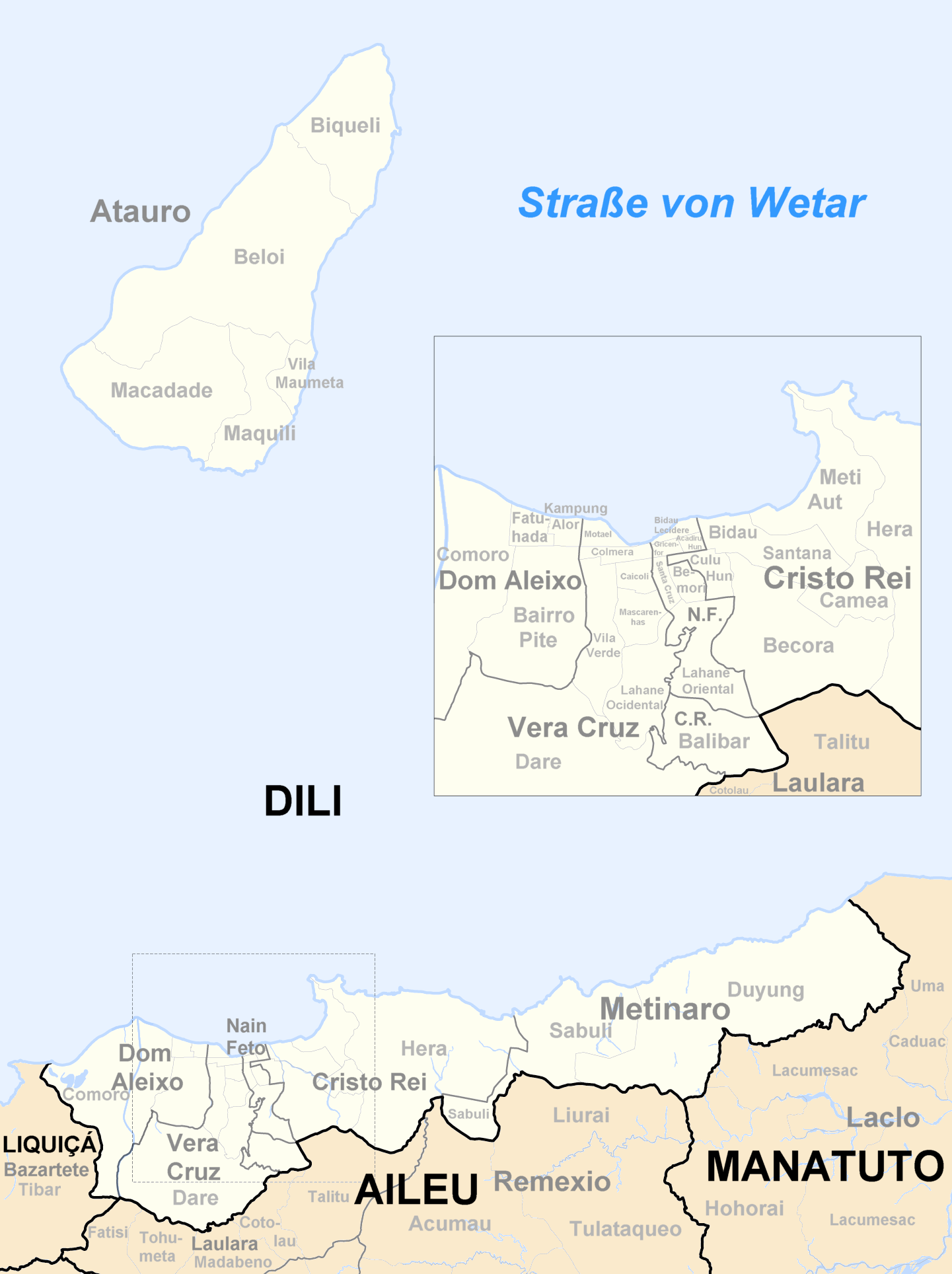
Subdivisions of the municipality

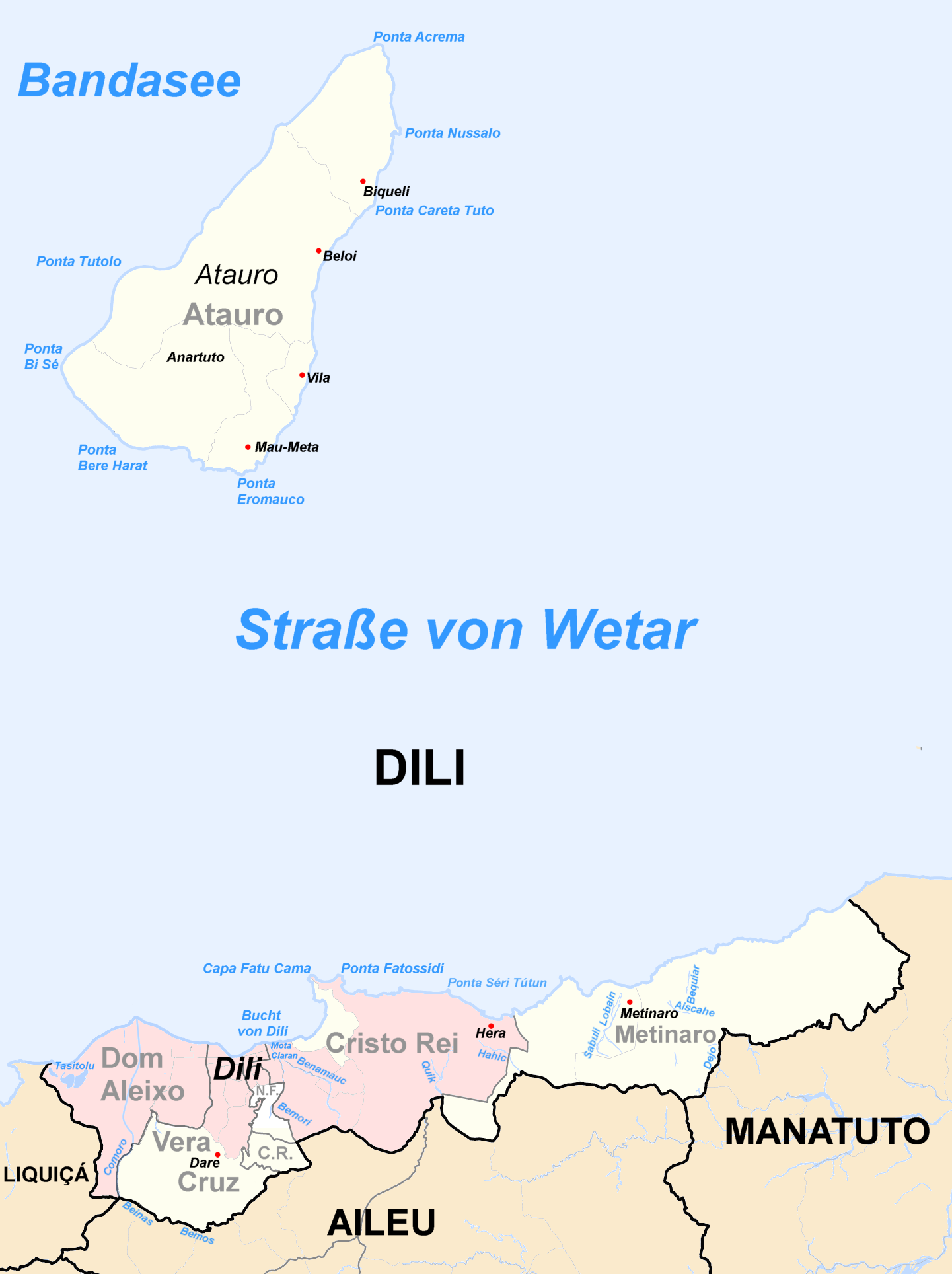
Cities in the municipality of Dili
