= Toko Lay =

Building in Dili, Timor-Leste

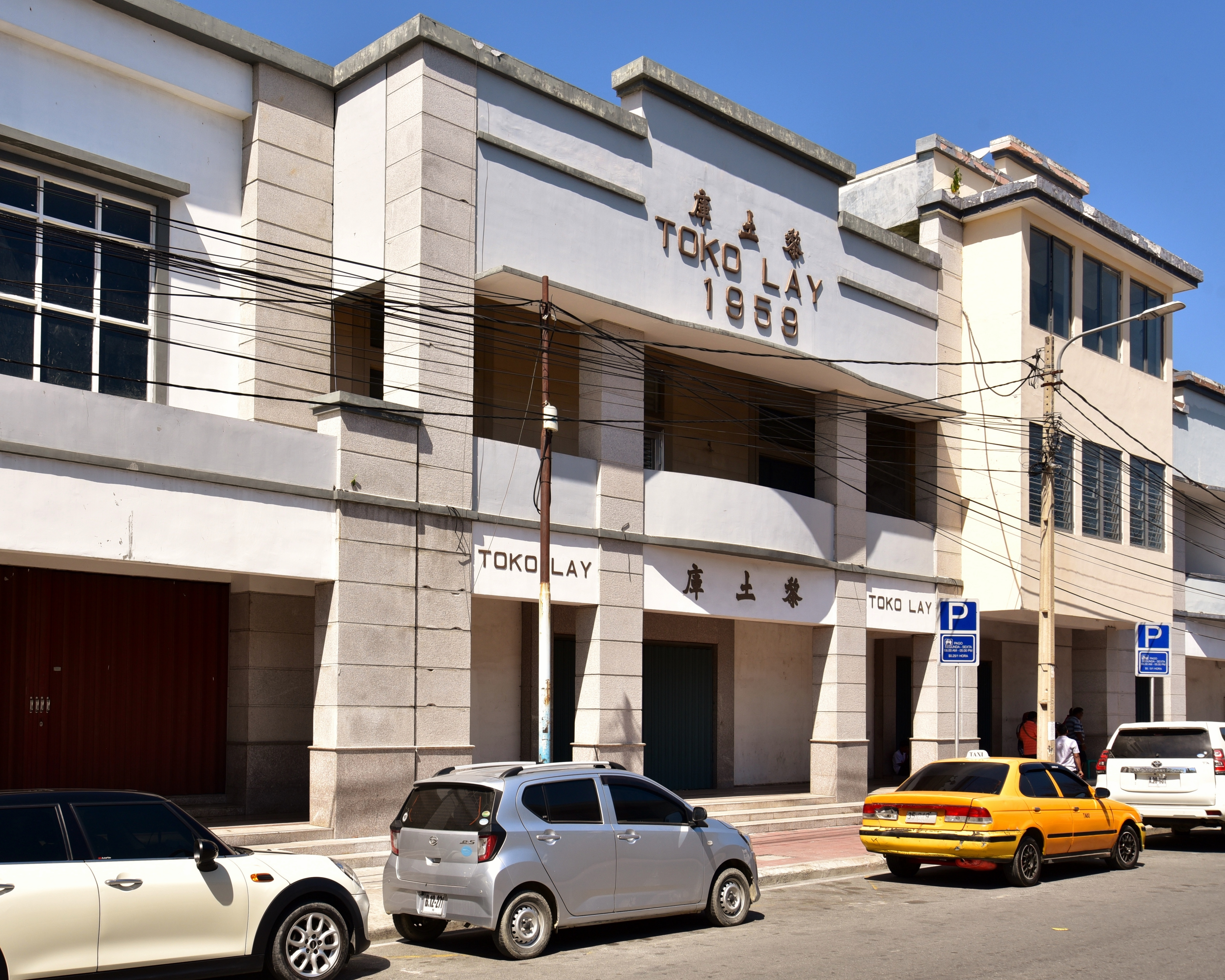
- Façade of the building in 2023
- Interactive map of the Toko Lay area

General information
- Location: Colmera, Dili, Timor-Leste
- Coordinates: 8°33′16″S 125°34′37″E
- Opened: 1959

Chinese name
- Traditional Chinese: 黎土庫
- Simplified Chinese: 黎土库
- Literal meaning: Lay Store
Transcriptions
Standard Mandarin
- Hanyu Pinyin: Lí tǔkù
Yue: Cantonese
- Jyutping: Lai4 tou2fu3
Southern Min
- Hokkien POJ: Lê thó͘-khò͘

Portuguese name
- Portuguese: Toko Lay

Tetum name
- Tetum: Toko Lay

Toko Lay (traditional Chinese: 黎土庫; simplified Chinese: 黎土库; pinyin: Lí tǔkù; Jyutping: Lai4 tou2fu3; Pe̍h-ōe-jī: Lê thó͘-khò͘; lit. 'Lay Store'; transl. Lay Department Store; Portuguese: Toko Lay; Tetum: Toko Lay) is a commercial building in the centre of Dili, Timor-Leste.

Constructed in 1959 during the Portuguese colonial era, it has always been a hardware store owned by members of the Lay family, a Timorese extended family of Chinese descent.

In the course of the Indonesian invasion of East Timor in 1975, the building served as a refuge; more recently, it was damaged during the violence of September 1999.

== History ==
=== Establishment and ownership ===
As indicated by the inscription on its façade, the Toko Lay hardware store dates from 1959.

The building has always been owned by members of the Lay extended family of East Timor, all of whom probably originated in the Chinese province of Guangdong. The family has survived every major East Timorese event since the building was constructed, including Portuguese colonialism, Indonesian invasion, occupation, and then destruction, and later the UN-supervised period of rebuilding.

As of mid 1975, the store's owner was Lay Tin Hsiong, who had travelled abroad a few months earlier.

=== Indonesian invasion of Timor ===
Between August and December 1975, political instability grew in Portuguese Timor. Many Dili residents left their homes and gathered in the town's few large buildings. Others arrived as refugees from regional centres such as Liquiçá, Suai and Same. Chico Lay, brother-in-law of Lay Tin Hsiong, gave the Chinese community permission to take refuge inside Toko Lay.

A Chinese trader from Dili, Chong Kui Yan, and his family were amongst those refugees; in 1984, he told Amnesty International that ultimately there were more than 100 people staying in the building.

On the morning of 7 December 1975, around 20 people, all of Chinese ethnicity, were in the building as the Indonesian army invaded Dili. At an early stage of the invasion, the parachute of an Indonesian paratrooper became caught on the top of the building, and the paratrooper was left hanging dead.

In a statement to the Committee on International Relations of the United States House of Representatives on 23 March 1977, James Dunn, an Australian public servant and diplomat, wrote that an informant had told him that the Indonesians had become enraged that an Australian flag was protruding from Toko Lay's third floor; the Indonesians, he wrote, had gone up and shot all of the Chinese men in the building.

Chong Kui Yan's account to Amnesty International of the events in Dili on the morning of the invasion included the following:

"The Indonesians first attacked at about 6.30 am. In the Toko Lay we heard a lot of shooting and the sound of machine-guns. At about 10 that morning they started bombarding and shooting at the house.

People started screaming, saying they were civilians, and not political. One person, Tsam I Tin, who had come to Dili from Same, came out of the house next to the Toko Lay to surrender and was shot dead. His son came out also and was also shot but not fatally. He pretended to be dead and survived.

The Indonesians then broke into the building and told everyone to come out. They took us down to the beach by the Sporting Clube. There were more than 10 of them. All of us were taken, including my wife who was pregnant, and my child. When we were in front of the Sporting Clube, we were made to sit in line. The Indonesians made as though they were going to shoot at us but did not fire.

When people cried out, the Indonesians ordered us to walk on for about 50 metres down towards the harbour. We were told to stop again and to face the sea. The taller ones were told to stand in front, the shorter ones behind. Again they cocked their rifles and made as if to fire. Then they made us walk to the harbour gate. Again they cocked their rifles and the people were scared again.

Then the Indonesians told the women and children to go to the Chinese school."

According to Chong, the Indonesians then chose 16 of the men from Toko Lay as a work detail to dig graves in the public garden and bury dead Indonesians, some that day and about 20 more on the following morning, 8 December 1975. Overnight, the men slept in the new customs house, under Indonesian guard. At midday on 8 November 1975, six of the work detail, including Chong, were told to go down to the harbour.

At the harbour, Chong saw many dead bodies; the only one he recognised was that of Isabel Lobato, wife of the then Prime Minister of East Timor. The six men were told to tie the bodies to iron poles, attach bricks, and throw the bodies into the sea. After all the bodies had been thrown into the sea, about 20 more people, ethnic Chinese who lived in Colmera, were brought in, told to face the sea, and shot dead. More were brought in later, including the 10 men from the work detail who had earlier been left outside in the garden. When the killing had stopped, the six men spent more time tying bodies up and throwing them into the sea. Then, after a short interval, they were allowed to go.

Amnesty International later compiled a list of 24 Chinese-Timorese reported killed in the harbour area, including the 10 men from the work detail. The victims ranged in age from 16 to 60. Some were traders, others were students, one a carpenter and another a cook. Eleven were named Lay. Two were women, each of whom had insisted on accompanying her husband, also a victim, from the garden area. Another victim was reportedly later bound and thrown into the sea by his own father.

Much later, James Dunn wrote a chapter in a book of essays and eyewitness accounts of genocide first published in 1995. In that chapter, entitled "Genocide in East Timor", Dunn included an abbreviated version of an account given by a witness to the invasion of Dili, Etelvina Correira, who had been one of the few witnesses at the scene of the killings at the Dili waterfront. According to Correira, 59 men, including Chinese and Timorese, were taken to the wharf at 2 pm on 8 December 1975 and executed one by one. The witnesses to these killings were ordered to count them; they were also told that the killings were in reprisal for the killing of a paratrooper near Toko Lay.

Later still, another witness, Erminio da Silva da Costa, told the Commission for Reception, Truth and Reconciliation in East Timor that when, on the day of the invasion or the following day, he had accompanied Brigadier General Benny Moerdani around the city, they had come upon an ethnic Chinese woman near Toko Lay whose husband had been shot and killed by Indonesian troops. Costa testified that the woman had asked for help burying her husband, to which Moerdani had replied: "I am sorry if there was a mistake. I am responsible, and I am sorry."

=== Indonesian occupation–present ===
As of late August 1999, near the end of the Indonesian occupation, and immediately before the East Timorese independence referendum was held, the manager of Toko Lay was Lay Chung Eng, son of the founder. The building showed few signs of the invasion.

During the post-referendum violence of the following month, Toko Lay was damaged. Two years later, burn marks were still visible on its façade and in the godown behind it. By then, the shop manager was Charles Tan; he told the South China Morning Post that it was very sad to see the full extent of the damage around Dili, but also said that, "We can't be angry at the destruction of our property. Everyone suffered at that time, not only me."

In mid 2012, a mass grave containing the bodies of 72 people, likely of Chinese ethnicity, was found at the Government Palace, near the Toko Lay building. It was not clear whether the grave dated to the Indonesian invasion of 1975 or to an earlier time, such as World War II.

Damien Kingsbury, an Australian academic specialising in Timor-Leste affairs, said that if the bones discovered at that time were not East Timorese, they were likely to be from East Timor's large Chinese community at the time of the Indonesian invasion. "When the Indonesians invaded [the territory] in 1975, ... [the Chinese] were one of the main targets of the Indonesian military," he explained.

In 2022, Centro Nacional Chega! identified Toko Lay as one of more than 30 historical sites across Dili forming part of the story of East Timor's 24-year resistance against Indonesian occupation.

== Description ==
Toko Lay is located on Rua 25 de Abril (previously Rua Nicolau dos Reis Lobato, and, during the Portuguese colonial era, Rua José Maria Marques), in Suco Colmera.

Four-storeys high, the building is one of Dili's more elegant colonial-era, Chinese-owned shops; it has a clean stone façade, a high ceilinged interior, and a godown at rear.

The stock in trade available for sale within may include Chinese-made generators and Vietnamese rice, together with a wide variety of such items as nuts, bolts, plumbing parts, pipes and plugs. As of 2006, Toko Lay was a rice importer, and Vietnam the major source of such imports.

== See also ==
- Chinese cemetery of Dili
- Chinese people in Timor-Leste
- Chinese Temple of Dili
