= List of mosques in Timor-Leste =

This is a list of mosques in Timor-Leste.

It lists mosques (Arabic: Masjid, Tetum: Meskita) and Islamic centres in Timor-Leste, Southeast Asia.

Timore have 25 mosques as of 2022.

| Name | Image | City | Region | Denomination | Century | Remarks |
|---|---|---|---|---|---|---|
| Masjid An-Nur | | Dili | Dili | Sunni | 1958 | |
| Masjid Al-Munawarah | | Dili | | | | |
| Masjid Al-Hidayah | | Suco Batano, Same | | | | |
| Musholla Al-ikhlas | | kampung tuti | | | | |
| Masjid At Taqwa | | Lospalos | | | | |
| Masjid Al-‘Amal | | Baucau | Baucau | | | |
| Masjid Liquica hekar | | Dili | | | | |

== See also ==
- Islam in Timor-Leste
- Lists of mosques
