= Islam in Timor-Leste =

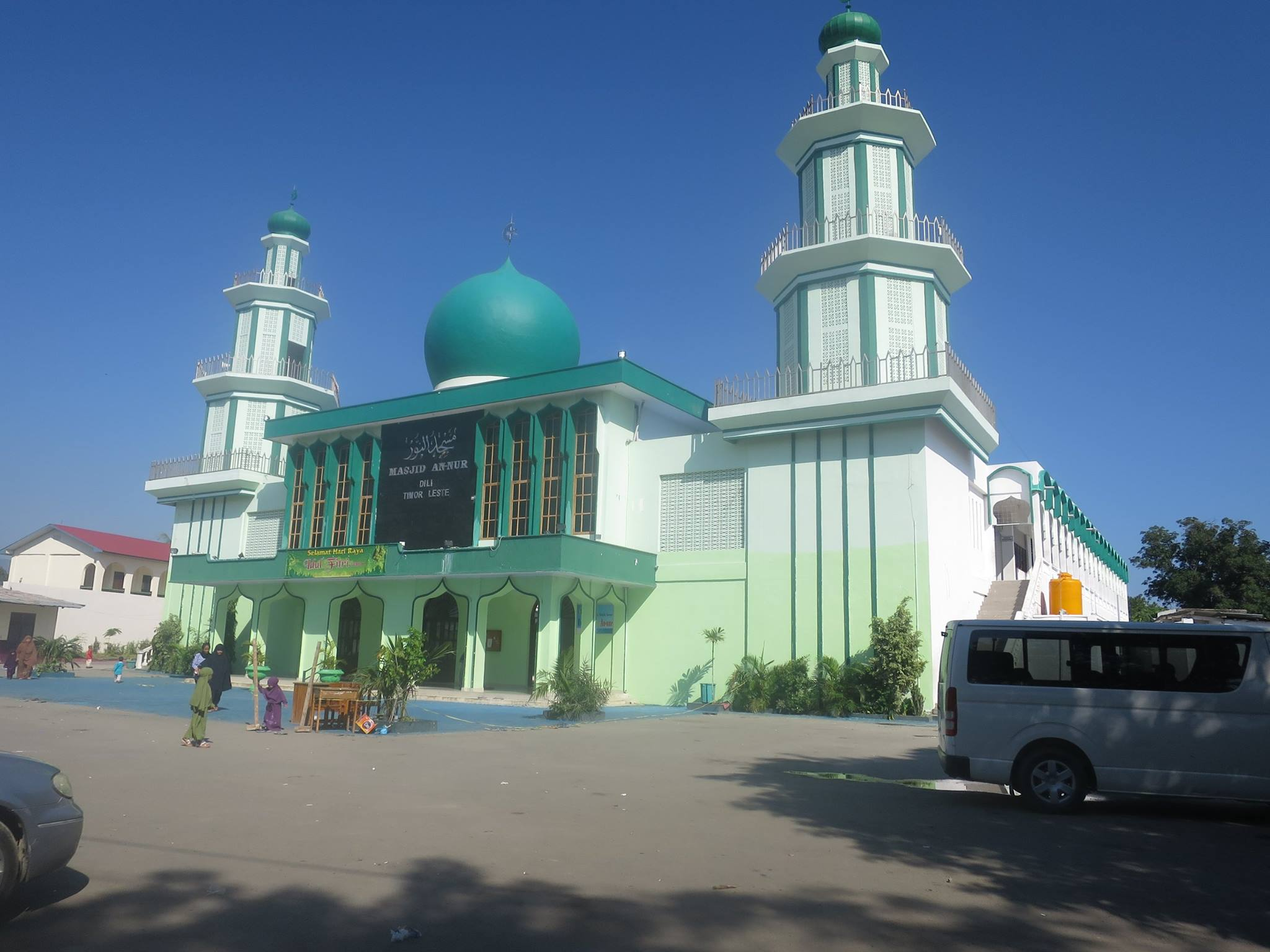
The An-Nur Mosque in Dili. The mosque has been vandalized several times. It reopened in 2014 after renovations.

Islam in Timor-Leste is the minority religion. According to ARDA official figures, 3.6% of the population of Timor-Leste are Muslims 2020. The majority of Muslims are Sunni.

== Spread of Islam ==
Timorese Muslims include Arabs and Indonesians. They have settled in East Timor over the past decade, either seeking business opportunities or as part of Indonesia's national policy of supporting the transition to the province, which is struggling for independence. 2015 census found that 2,850 Timorese citizens declared themselves Muslim (1,695 Muslims live in the country's capital, Dili, 258 in Baucau, 236 in Lautém, 212 in Viqueque, etc.).

Since 2005, along with numerous Christian holidays, Eid al-Fitr and Eid al-Adha have been declared public holidays.

== Timorese Arabs ==
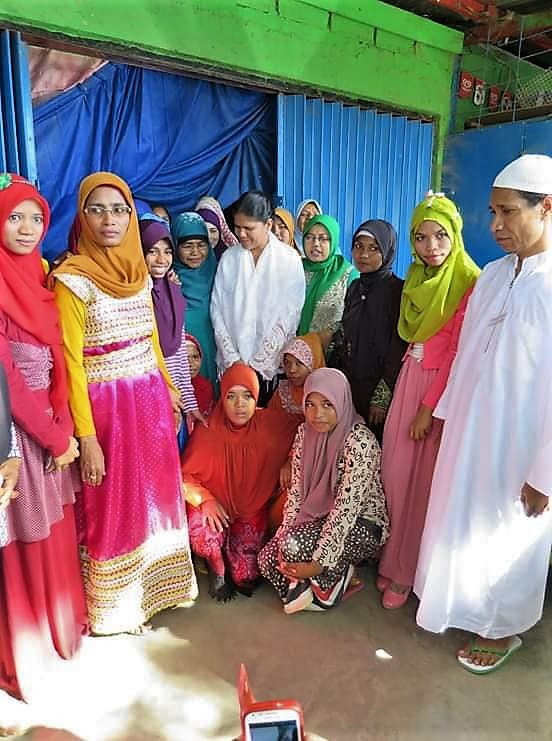
Timorese Muslims

Muslims have always been a minority in Timor-Leste, where the Roman Catholic Church dominates. However, the two communities have lived in harmony for centuries.

The first Arab merchants bought sandalwood, slaves, and honey in Timor-Leste and transported it via Java and Sulawesi to China and India. Their descendants live mainly in the Kampung Alor district of West Dili. At the time of the 1949 census, there were 149 Arabs in the country.

Yemeni Arabs from Hadhramaut settled in Portuguese Timor in the late 19th century, where they were partly assimilated with the people of Southeast Asia. Some members of the Arab community held administrative positions in the Japanese military police during the Japanese occupation (1942–1945), and were accused of collaborating with the tyrants.

In 1957, many Arabs applied to the Indonesian consulate in Dili to obtain citizenship in the Muslim-majority country of Indonesia, to which Portugal responded by offering them Portuguese citizenship.

Since the 1970s, Arabs have been one of the four socio-ethnic groups in East Timor, along with Europeans, Chinese, and Timorese.

== Mosque ==
In the 1940s, the Arab minority began to make efforts to build the first mosque in Dili. The mosque was completed in 1955 by Imam Haji Hassan ibn Abdullah Balatif. The head of the Roman Catholic Church diocese in Dili provided bricks for the building. Later, he often visited the mosque during Muslim holidays. The mosque building was renovated in 1981.

During the 1999 and 2006 crisis, the mosque served as a shelter for refugees, who were housed in classrooms within the mosque complex. The mosque was protected from the bandits who were attacking it by well-armed UN peacekeepers

Basílio do Nascimento, (Note: 1996 winner of the Nobel Peace Prize for his efforts to peacefully and justly resolve the conflict in Timor-Leste) visited a mosque before the Islamic holiday of Eid al-Adha, marking the end of the Ramadan month, and promised Muslims that he would protect their historic mosque and other Islamic places of worship from attacks by bandits.

In December 2002, the mosque was set on fire by protesters against the Muslim Prime Minister Mari Alkatiri. Bishop (since 2002) Basílio do Nascimento apologized to Muslims for the actions of Catholics; offers the Imam of the Muslim community the use of the Catholic Church's radio station to broadcast Friday sermons, and also invites them to give lectures on Islam at a Catholic seminary.

During the unrest following the 2012 parliamentary elections, some demonstrators attempted to damage a mosque. Sixteen of the attackers were detained by police.

The imam of the Dili Mosque (since 2018) is Julio Muslim António da Costa.

The chairman of the Muslim National Council of Timor-Leste (since 2019) is Ahmad Ali Alayudi.

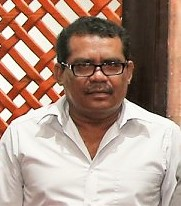
Arif Abdullah Sagran

Since 2018, the President of the Islamic Community Center of Timor-Leste (CENCITIL) is Arif Abdullah Sagran. The President of the Islamic Community, Arif Abdullah Sagran, stated that the level of Islamic education in Timor-Leste is very low. The Ministry of Religious Affairs has provided scholarships to send 5 Muslim children to study in Indonesia. Most of the students do not return. They prefer to settle in Indonesia.

Currently there are several mosques in Timor-Leste, especially in the country's capital Dili. Among the largest and most famous is the An-Nur Mosque in Dili, the capital of Timor-Leste, where the Arab minority lives. Other mosques are Liquica Hekar Mosque and Al-Hidayah Mosque.

== Notable Muslims ==
- Mari Alkatiri
- Ali Alkatiri[de]
- Djafar Alkatiri[de]
- Marina Alkatiri[de]
- Nurima Alkatiri[de]

== See also ==
- Islam in Indonesia
- Islam in Portugal
- Islam in Southeast Asia
