= Chinese people in Timor-Leste =

Chinese people in Timor-Leste Sino-Timorese
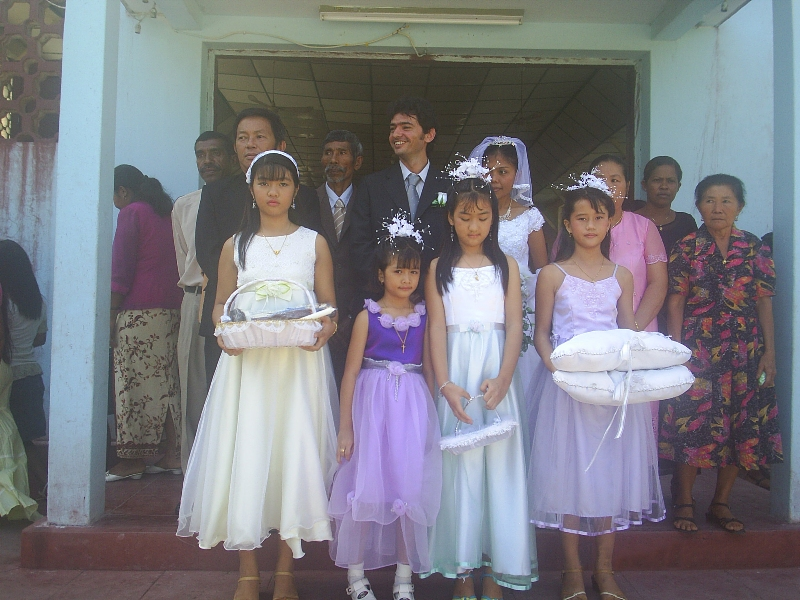
- A mixed wedding of East Timorese and Chinese Hakka people in Timor-Leste, where the four flower girls and the mother of the bride on the far right are of Chinese Hakka descent.

Total population
- 4,000 to 20,000

Regions with significant populations
- Timor-Leste; Australia; Singapore

Languages
- Portuguese, Indonesian, Chinese (Hakka, Cantonese, Mandarin), Tetum, Macanese

Religion
- Catholicism, Confucianism, Buddhism, Taoism

Related ethnic groups
- Chinese Indonesians, Macanese people

Chinese people in Timor-Leste, or the Sino-Timorese, consist of Chinese migrants to Timor-Leste and their descendants. The Chinese minority is a small proportion of the East Timorese population. Most are originally of Hokkien descent, with some being Hakka and also a small number of Cantonese within the populace. Many Sino-Timorese left shortly after the Indonesian invasion of East Timor, usually to Australia or Singapore.

== History ==
=== Pre-Colonial Era ===
As early as the 10th century CE, Timorese sandalwood was being transported to China through the Straits of Malacca.

The Chinese official Zhao Rukuo in 1225 CE mentioned Timor in his collected notes from traders as a location rich in sandalwood. Although Santalum album is found across many parts of the Pacific and Indian Ocean regions, the highest quality white sandalwood was considered to come from Timor, the Lesser Sunda Islands. Around 1350, Chinese authors wrote in the Tao-i chin-lueh:

In Timor's mountains the only trees that grow are sandalwood. The wood is traded with those further west for silver, iron, goblets and coloured fabric. In total, there are twelve locations that are used as harbours.

The Chinese traded porcelain, glass and silver with the Timorese for the sandalwood, which was used in China for ritual and medicinal purposes. For centuries the Chinese traders remained the only foreigners who ventured into the interior of the island of Timor, although they generally only remained in Timor as long as it took to do business, it being located too far from the trade routes between China, India and the larger islands for them to settle there.

=== Colonial Era ===
The Jiajing Emperor forbade all trade by sea in 1551. The Portuguese had recently reached East Asia, filling the gap in the trade routes between the Lesser Sunda Islands and China. However, the Chinese traders returned soon after, predominantly via the Portuguese-controlled port of Macau in southern China.

In the middle of the 17th century CE around twenty Junks visited the island of Timor each year, bringing rice and other goods. Chinese traders from Macau established trade relationships with the Timorese in the areas controlled by the Portuguese, and later also in the areas controlled by the Dutch. From this point, they also began settling in Timor, initially in Kupang und Lifau, then later also in Atapupu und Dili. They were so successful that in 1614 that the Dutch traders complained that the Chinese traders were outcompeting them with their goods, which were produced in China at a much lower cost. Another Dutch source reported that traders from Macau were making profits of 200% on Timorese sandalwood, stating in 1646 that 1000 Bahar of Sandalwood being transported to Macau annually.

Yongzheng Emperor permitted outside trade again in 1723, which allowed the creation of the trade triangle Canton – Timor – Batavia (today known as Jakarta), but which made trade via Macau unprofitable.

In 1775 there existed a Chinese quarter in Kupang, from where food production and supply was controlled. In addition the Chinese continued to control the sandalwood trade via Macassar to China and also the trade in beeswax to Java, where it was required in the production of batik. Wax was also used to produce candles for trade. Other trade products included honey and slaves, and a great deal of smuggling was also conducted. Some Chinese from Kupang and Atapupu later began also took up business as roaming traders in the interior of Timor. At this time, around 300 Chinese families lived in Kupang, Atapupu and Dili, mainly originating from Macau.

==== 19th century ====
In the 19th century, Portuguese Timor was administered from the colonial authorities in Macau. The colony in Timor ran at a financial loss, and was financed by funds from the relatively wealthy Macau. In 1832, there were around 300 Chinese families in the Portuguese half of Timor alone.

In the late 19th century, Portuguese governor José Celestino accused Chinese traders and smugglers from Atapupu in Dutch-controlled West Timor of supplying arms to native Timorese in the eastern half, who were mounting rebellions and insurgencies against Portuguese colonial rule.

However, for the most part the Chinese shared a similar fate to that of the Portuguese colonial population. When in 1861 Dili was threatened by native Timorese rebels, governor Afonso de Castro himself armed the Chinese inhabitants of the city so that they could join in defence of the city. During a revolt of native troops serving in the colonial military, the leader of the Chinese community of Dili, the Capitão China, was murdered. A. Marques Perreira, commissioner for Chinese migration from Macao to Portuguese Timor, attested to the Chinese community that they were the most useful section of Dili's population conducting important crafts such as woodworking, of which the native Timorese had no knowledge. In addition to this, they conducted a large section of the trade through the city. In 1877, a missionary of Chinese descent was given charge of educating the Chinese schoolchildren in Dili.

==== 20th century ====
With the beginnings of steamship traffic between Macau and Dili, the migration of Chinese to Portuguese Timor increased. Among the migrants were some fleeing the rule of the Manchu emperors. By 1912, the Chinese community was well-organised, possessing a Chinese Society Building, and Buddhist temple and their own school. Clube Chum Fuk Tong Su, the first Chinese school in the colony, offered classes in Chinese and taught further subjects including English, Zoology and Botany. In 1926 a statue of Buddha was brought over from China, and from 1928 onwards stood in the new Guan Yu Temple which neighboured the government palace. This state and temple still exist today, as does the old Chinese Chamber of Commerce.

Before the beginning of the Second World War, around 2000 Chinese lived in the colony. The island of Timor was occupied by the Japanese in 1942, following the Battle of Timor, which saw a great deal of suffering inflicted on both the Chinese community and the indigenous Timorese. 60 Chinese were killed by the occupiers, with a further 200 dying of hunger and mistreatment.

Following the surrender of Japan in 1945, East Timor was returned to Portuguese colonial rule. In the 1960s, the Republic of China (Taiwan), which at that point represented China at the United Nations, opened a consulate in Dili. Estimates of the Chinese population of Portuguese Timor during this era vary - in 1970 the official number of Chinese inhabitants was 6,120, however other sources give higher figures. In 1975, it was estimated that up to 20,000 Chinese lived in the colony, many of whom possessed Taiwanese citizenship.

=== 1975 Declaration of Independence and Indonesian invasion ===
When East Timor unilaterally declared independence on 28 November 1975, the People's Republic of China was one of the few countries which granted it official recognition. The Hakka Chinese community in Dili were guaranteed full citizenship in the new country by the FRETILIN government. However, only nine days later the Indonesian military occupied East Timor, with many of the Chinese community being killed or fleeing to Australia during the invasion. For example, several members of the Chinese community took refuge in the Toko Lay building in Dili. Members of the Chinese minority were also victims of ethnic persecution by the occupying forces in the years which followed. However, there was also significant emigration by Chinese Indonesians to East Timor during this period.

According to research by Loro Horta, son of José Ramos-Horta, the People's Republic of China attempted to support the FALINTIL resistance with delivery of weapons. However, an ocean blockade by Australian and Indonesian warships stopped this from being successful, and the armaments, including weaponry for 8,000 soldiers, artillery and anti-tank weapons were instead sent to Mozambique, where they were given to rebels fighting against the RENAMO. After the death of Mao Zedong in 1976, the engagement between China and East Timor dropped away, having almost entirely ceased by 1978 except for some limited contact via individuals and financial assistance for the Timorese resistance which was helped through by Chinese businesspeople.

=== Independence era 2002–present ===
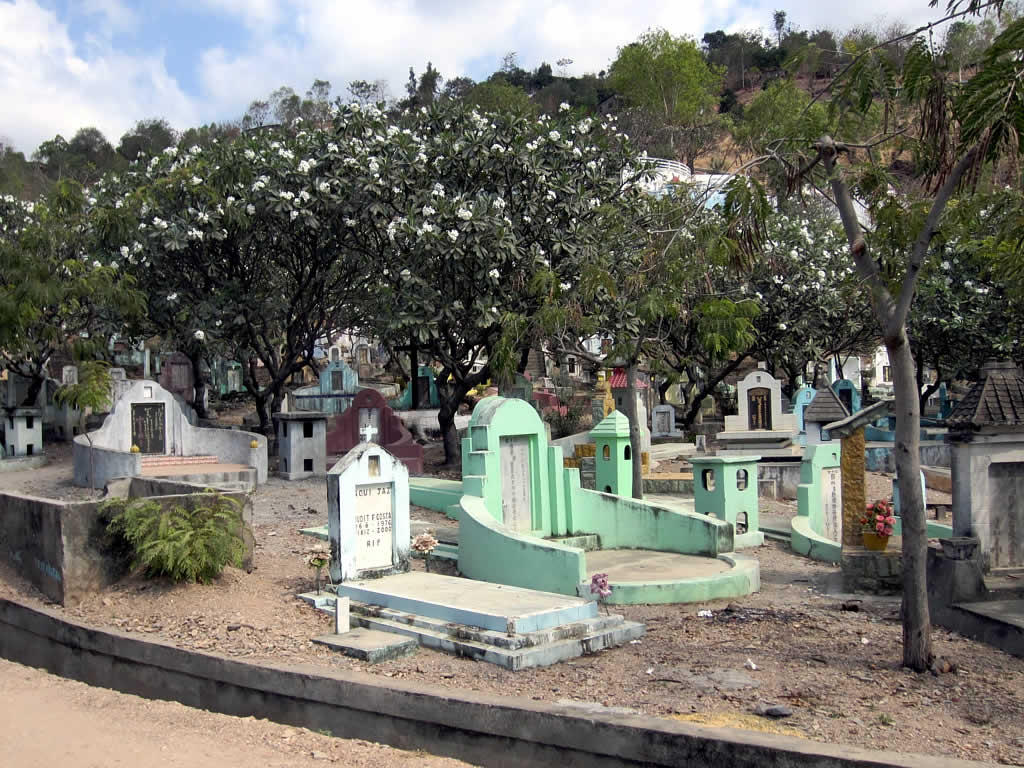
Chinese cemetery of Dili

The majority, about two-thirds, of East Timorese Hakka migrated to Australia during the era of Indonesian occupation, mainly living in Darwin, Sydney and Melbourne with smaller communities in Brisbane and Perth, where they have formed tight-knit bonds and go to "extraordinary lengths" to meet and hold cultural events with other Chinese-Timorese, rejecting identification with other Chinese and Timorese communities. Furthermore, in the aftermath of the riots that followed the independence process in 2002, many businesses owned by ethnic Chinese in Dili were targeted for arson attacks. A small number have since returned, including politicians Pedro Lay, who had fled to Australia in 1975. This return was encouraged by politicians such as Ramos-Horta and Xanana Gusmão, who visited communities in Australia, in the belief that they would help rebuild the nation's economic activity; nevertheless, the majority of East Timorese Hakka or Chinese-Timorese live in Australia.

Since the renewed independence of Timor-Leste in 2002 and the United Nations administration, the People's Republic of China has again become one of the most important partners of Timor-Leste, being the first nation to begin diplomatic relations in 2002. The Chinese government has taken part in peacekeeping missions. Besides trade connections, China also provides assistance for Timor-Leste in the military and cultural fields. This has including training and equipment for East Timorese farmers, police, soldiers and medical teams, inviting East Timorese students to study in China, and financing the construction of the presidential palace and foreign ministry in Dili and of the army headquarters in Metinaro. Attempts on the part of the Taiwanese government to make connections with Timor-Leste have met with resistance from the PRC government.

Around 500 East Timorese list Chinese as their mother tongue, with a further 2,342 citizens of the People's Republic of China living in the country in 2008, according to the Chinese Embassy. The department of immigration estimates that there may actually be as many as 3,000, including a number who reside in the country illegally. The Chinese community mainly operation small businesses and restaurants in the capital, as well as small stores in rural areas, where there are often no other shops.

== Situation ==
Relations between other ethnic groups and the Chinese are relatively peaceful, and while some animosity and jealousy towards them for their economic prominence as well as violence has been recorded, significant inter-cultural participation has been observed between both groups in contexts such as religious rituals. However, "local Chinese" are held in higher regard compared to post-independence migrants, and other East Timorese believe that, although Chinese cultural expression is fine, their primary loyalty should be with Timor-Leste, with many Chinese being seen as unwilling to assimilate pre-1975 due to their holding of ROC passports.

Timor-Leste has a unique variety of Hakka, which is a central part of Chinese identity there. In recent years, fluency in Hakka is decreasing, with perhaps a fifth of the population identifying as Hakka in the country being fluent, although documentation is made difficult by a lack of tracking in the East Timorese census. While East Timorese Hakka shows some closeness to the Meixian dialect, it exhibits a number of unique features and words. Loanwords are present from Tetum, Portuguese, Indonesian and (mainly in the speech of Australian Chinese-Timorese) English.

== Notable East Timorese people of Chinese descent ==
- Francisco Kalbuadi Lay
- Lin Jong
- Jen Shyu

== See also ==
- China–Timor-Leste relations
- Chinese Temple of Dili
- Chinese cemetery of Dili
- Toko Lay
