= China–Timor-Leste relations =

- China: Timor-Leste

China–Timor-Leste relations were established shortly following Timor-Leste's independence on May 20, 2002. However, China had established a representative office in Dili in 2000, when it was still under United Nations administration.

== History ==
As early as the 10th century CE, Timorese sandalwood was being transported to China through the Straits of Malacca.

The Chinese official Zhao Rukuo in 1225 CE mentioned Timor in his collected notes from traders as a location rich in sandalwood, the Zhu Fan Zhi. Although Santalum album is found across many parts of the Pacific and Indian Ocean regions, the highest quality white sandalwood was considered to come from Timor, the Lesser Sunda Islands. Around 1350, Chinese authors wrote in the Tao-i chin-lueh:

In Timor's mountains the only trees that grow are sandalwood. The wood is traded with those further west for silver, iron, goblets and coloured fabric. In total, there are twelve locations that are used as harbours.

The Chinese traded porcelain, glass and silver with the Timorese for the sandalwood, which was used in China for ritual and medicinal purposes. For centuries the Chinese traders remained the only foreigners who ventured into the interior of the island of Timor, although they generally only remained in Timor as long as it took to do business, it being located too far from the trade routes between China, India and the larger islands for them to settle there.

When East Timor was under Portuguese rule, Taiwan, as the "Republic of China", had a Consulate in Dili. However, when Fretilin unilaterally declared the territory's independence as the Democratic Republic of East Timor, on 28 November 1975, the People's Republic of China was one of seven countries in the world (alongside Albania and five Lusophone African nations) to recognise the new state.

Following the Indonesian invasion on 7 December 1975, China, as a permanent member of the UN Security Council, supported United Nations Security Council Resolution 384 deploring the invasion, upholding the territory's right to self-determination and calling on Indonesia to withdraw.

Since Timor-Leste's independence in 2002, China has financed the construction of the Presidential Palace in Dili, as well as the Ministry of Foreign Affairs and the residential headquarters of the Defence Force.

Timor-Leste and China both participate in the multi-lateral group Forum Macao, which China formed in 2003 to increase economic and commercial cooperation between China and the Portuguese-speaking countries.

In 2003, Beijing signed a deal with the Community of Portuguese Language Countries, of which Timor-Leste is a member, to increase trade and economic development among the countries.

Timor-Leste's dismissal of hundreds of soldiers resulted in demonstrations and then riots in Dili, prompting the Chinese embassy to shelter and then evacuate Chinese citizens.

In 2006, the then President Xanana Gusmão called China "a “reliable friend” and had committed Timor-Leste to a One China policy.

In 2014, the two countries issued a joint communiqué reaffirming that Timor-Leste recognised the Government of the People's Republic of China as "the sole lawful Government representing the whole of China", that Taiwan was "an inalienable part of the Chinese territory", and that Timor-Leste would not establish "any form of official relationship or conduct any form of official contacts" with Taiwan.

There is also increased military cooperation between the two countries, with the 2008 purchase of two Shanghai-Class patrol boats from a Chinese company. These boats were initially to be crewed by Chinese sailors, while the Chinese trained the Timorese to guard their coasts. In addition, China signed a contract providing US$9 million toward the building of a new headquarters for the military in Timor-Leste.

Timor-Leste joined the Belt and Road Initiative (BRI) in 2017.

Effective 1 December 2024, China eliminated tariffs for goods imported from all of the countries that the United Nations categorizes as least developed and with which China has diplomatic relations, including Timor-Leste.

== See also ==
- Chinese people in Timor-Leste
- Foreign relations of Timor-Leste
- Foreign relations of the People's Republic of China
