= Government Palace, Dili =

Official workplace of the prime minister and Constitutional Government of Timor-Leste

Government Palace
- Palácio do Governo (Portuguese); Palásiu Governu (Tetum)
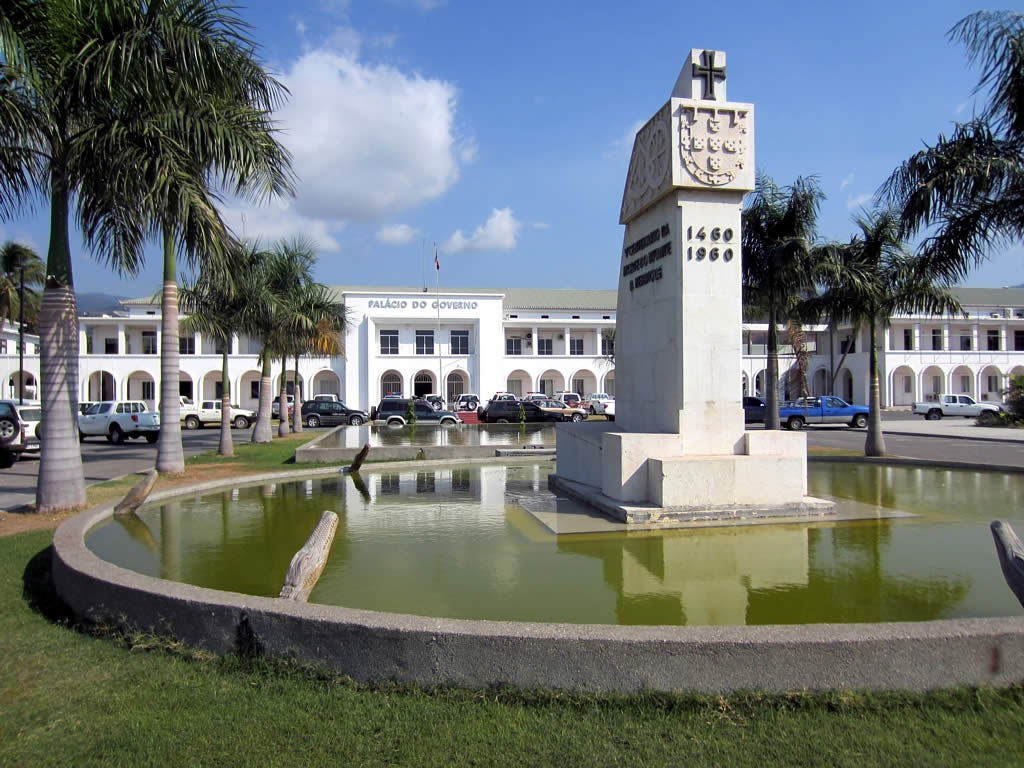
- The palace in 2011, with the monument to Prince Henry the Navigator at right
- Interactive map of the Government Palace area

General information
- Type: Office building
- Architectural style: Portuguese colonial
- Location: Rua 30 de Agosto, Colmera, Dili, Timor-Leste
- Coordinates: 8°33′16″S 125°34′43″E
- Current tenants: Prime Minister of Timor-Leste
- Owner: Government of Timor-Leste

Website
- Government of Timor-Leste

The Government Palace (Portuguese: Palácio do Governo, Tetum: Palásiu Governu) in Dili, the capital city of Timor-Leste, is the official workplace of the prime minister and Constitutional Government of Timor-Leste. In the final stages of the Portuguese colonial era, it was known as the Official Palace (Portuguese: Palácio das Repartições, Tetum: Palásiu das Repartisaun Publikas), and was the office of the colonial governor.

== History ==
=== The old palace ===
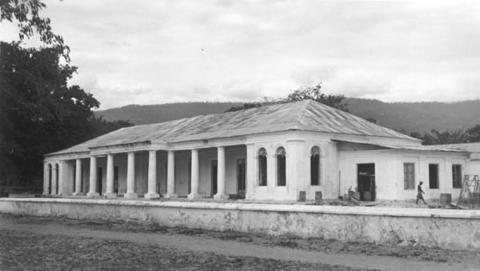
The old palace in 1940

The present Government Palace was constructed to replace an earlier government palace, built in Dili between 1874 and 1881 to be the official residence of the colonial governor. An elongated single-storey building with a colonnaded façade, the earlier palace ceased to be the official residence in 1886, when a new official residence, the Palácio de Lahane, was completed in the mountains south of Dili.

As of the 1940s, the government offices in Dili were distributed between the old palace, the services building and the finance building. Within the old palace were the government secretariat, the governor's office, the Directorate of the civil administration services, and the military division.

The services building, a very large structure built between 1882 and 1886, housed the services of the Public Works and the post office. The finance building, an unpretentious single-storey structure built in 1890 to store materiel for the colonial military, but actually used provisionally as a hospital until 1909, was the headquarters of the colony's finance services.

In December 1941, Allied forces entered Dili. In February 1942, the city was bombed, invaded and occupied by Japanese forces, and the Australian contingent of the Allied forces retreated to the mountains. The following month, the Australians launched the first of several raids against Dili, but from early December 1942 the Australian operations in Timor were progressively wound down, and Japan was allowed to occupy the whole island.

By September 1945, when Japan surrendered, Dili, and particularly its central area, had been left devastated by the bombings from both forces.

=== The present palace ===
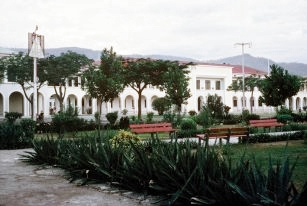
The present palace, c. 1969

Between the early 1950s and the end of the 1960s, the old palace and its accompanying buildings were replaced by the present palace, which was known during the remainder of the Portuguese colonial days as the Official Palace, and was the office of the colonial governor.

In the mid-1970s, after the authoritarian Estado Novo regime that had governed Portugal since 1933 was overthrown in the Carnation Revolution of 25 April 1974, at least three significant events consequent upon that revolution took place at the palace.

First, in a speech during a function at the palace in late 1974, Antonio de Almeida Santos, the Minister of Interterritorial Coordination in the new Portuguese government, stated that the East Timorese should be free to choose their own destiny. However, and at the request of the secretary of state for administration, he also spoke much more enthusiastically of the possibilities of continued association with Portugal or integration with Indonesia than of independence, which he suggested would not be realistic given that Portuguese Timor was far from "economic independence".

Secondly, on 28 November 1975, approximately a year later, the Fretilin political party, at a hastily organised ceremony before a crowd of 2,000 gathered in front of the palace, made a unilateral declaration of independence of East Timor from Portuguese colonial rule.

Thirdly, on 7 December 1975, just over a week later, Indonesia began a full-scale invasion of East Timor, focused on Dili. By midday, Indonesian troops had secured the palace and had posted teams along the key routes leading out of the centre of town.

On 17 December 1975, the Indonesians formed a Provisional Government of East Timor (PGET) (Indonesian: Pemerintah Sementara Timor Timur (PSTT)); they then proceeded to occupy East Timor until 1999. During the occupation, the palace was used as the Office of Governor/Head of Regional Administration of East Timor (Indonesian: Kantor Gubernur/Kepala Daerah Tingkat I Timor Timur).

In the immediate aftermath of the independence referendum of 30 August 1999 that led to Indonesia's withdrawal from Timor-Leste by the end of October 1999, the palace served as a refuge for many Timorese from the violent reaction of the Indonesian military and its allies to the referendum's outcome. From late in 1999, the palace housed the services of the United Nations Mission in East Timor (UNAMET). Subsequently, until Timor-Leste resumed independence in May 2002, it was the headquarters of UNAMET's successor, the United Nations Transitional Administration in East Timor (UNTAET).

During the violence in late 1999, much of Dili was set alight; as of April 2000, the palace was one of only a handful of fire damaged city buildings that had been repaired.

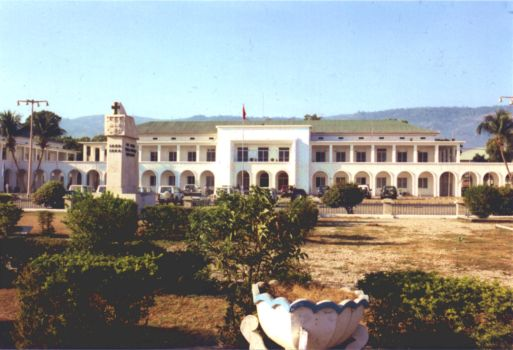
The palace in 2002

Since May 2002, the palace has been the official workplace of the prime minister and Constitutional Government of Timor-Leste.

In the Australian media, it has been alleged that in 2004, the Australian government, by bugging the palace's Cabinet Room, recorded certain private discussions between East Timor officials about negotiations with Australia over their maritime border. Shortly before 2004, the palace had been renovated under the guise of an Australian aid program. According to Clinton Fernandes, a professor of international and political studies at the University of New South Wales in Canberra, Australia, in his book Island off the Coast of Asia (2018), the listening devices installed in the palace:

"... were turned on and off by a covert agent inside the building. They then beamed the recording by microwave signal to a line-of-sight covert listening base set up inside the Central Maritime Hotel ... The digital recordings were then allegedly couriered across town to the Australian embassy, and sent to Canberra for analysis."

The Central Maritime Hotel was a former Russian hospital ship that had been converted into, and used in Myanmar as, a floating luxury hotel. It had then been towed to Dili, which at the time had had no landbound hotels or restaurants suitable for international visitors. There, it had been moored on the waterfront of the Bay of Dili, opposite the palace.

On 28 April 2006, in the early stages of a dispute between the government and a group of former soldiers, a riot broke out in Dili and a mob attacked the palace. Five people were killed in that incident; in the ensuing crisis over the next two months, a total of 37 people died, and 150,000 were displaced. On 20 June, after international forces had intervened in the dispute at the request of the government, a protest rally was held in front of the palace.

In June 2012, construction workers digging holes in the garden of the palace discovered a mass grave with the bones of at least 52 people. On preliminary examination, the bones appeared to be too large to be Timorese, and could have dated back to 1975. Damien Kingsbury, an Australian academic specialising in Timor-Leste affairs, said that if the bones are not East Timorese, they are likely to be from East Timor's large Chinese community at the time of the Indonesian invasion. "When the Indonesians invaded [the territory] in 1975, [the Chinese] were one of the main targets of the Indonesian military," he explained.

The following year, 2013, the Australian government issued a statement acknowledging that Timor-Leste had commenced arbitration proceedings in the Permanent Court of Arbitration in The Hague seeking a declaration that the Treaty on Certain Maritime Arrangements in the Timor Sea (CMATS) was void. The statement also revealed that Timor-Leste's contention in the arbitration was that Australia, by engaging in espionage during the negotiations over that treaty, had not conducted the negotiations in good faith. In March 2018, at the United Nations in New York, after years of further negotiations between Australia and Timor-Leste, the two nations signed the Treaty Between Australia and the Democratic Republic of Timor-Leste Establishing Their Maritime Boundaries in the Timor Sea. That treaty, which replaced the CMATS, established a Timor Sea boundary essentially following a median line.

On 30 August 2019, the prime ministers of the two nations stood outside the palace to announce the formal ratification of the treaty, and celebrate the 20th anniversary of Timor-Leste's vote for independence.

== Description ==
=== The palace ===
Located at Rua 30 de Agosto, in Colmera, a suco of Dili, the palace faces north towards Avenida Marginal, and beyond that, the Bay of Dili. It is composed of three independent blocks connected by a continuous peristyle running along its façade.

The central block is based on a 1953 design by João António de Aguiar, and was built in the first half of the 1950s. On its west side is the second block, which was constructed between 1960 and 1962. Originally, that block was used by the Department of Works, the workshops of which were in the southwest of the Bairo Central aldeia of Dili. The third block, to the east of the central block, was built between 1966 and 1969, to a 1963 design by António Sousa Mendes. Its initial use was for Postal Services, Telephones and Telegraphs (CTT).

In style, the palace is a traditional two-storey Portuguese structure with a symmetrical axis, a hip roof, and eaves. Formally, it follows the model used all over the then Portuguese Empire in the 1950s. The peristyle running along its façade consists of an arcade at ground level, and a veranda with a colonnade of pillars and a flat reinforced concrete roof at the second level.

The central block's arcade has seventeen arches (three central and seven lateral on each side). The central arches and the corresponding stretch of the upper veranda are in the form of a portico. The lateral blocks are slightly shorter than the central one. They have only fifteen arches (three central, again in the form of a portico, and six lateral on each side). The porticos on the lateral blocks are less noticeable than those of the central block, as they are a continuation of the veranda and no higher than the eaves. The side and rear walls of the palace have none of the architectural elements of the façade.

=== The plaza ===
Between the palace and the Avenida is a formal ceremonial urban open space, which was planned as a symbolic replication of the Praça do Comércio (transl. Commerce Plaza) in Lisbon. In the 2010s, the open space was re-branded from a largo (square) to a praça (plaza) honouring East Timor's unilateral declaration of independence in 1975. To its west was originally an infantry barracks and is now the Portuguese embassy. To its east was originally an open space planted with trees.

In the centre of the plaza is a monument erected in 1960 as a tribute to the Portuguese Prince Henry the Navigator. António Salazar's Estado Novo regime installed both that monument and other, similar, monuments across the Portuguese Empire. Also in 1960, the United Nations General Assembly resolved, in effect, to redefine the Timorese residents of the then Portuguese Timor as colonial subjects of Portugal, and asserted that they, not the colonial power, should determine their identity. According to Pat Walsh, an Australian human rights advocate:

"The [palace] and its largo to Henry were most likely Salazar's way of telling the UN va embora! (get lost) and the Timorese, nos estamos acui para ficar (we're here to stay)."

During the Indonesian occupation of East Timor, the monument was not damaged or destroyed. Walsh has speculated that that is because "... Indonesia chose not to antagonise Portugal which at that point was vacillating on the Timor question." However, an historian, Geoffrey Gunn, has uncovered evidence, in the form of a publication of a provincial Indonesian government, suggesting that the Indonesians wrongly understood that the monument was dedicated to a mere colonial official in Portuguese Timor.

Even in the 2010s, few Timorese could identify the monument's true subject. Nevertheless, the retention of the monument in such a prominent location appears to have been a conscious decision by Timor-Leste's government to embrace the country's Portuguese colonial legacy as part of its national identity.
