= Pura Girinatha =

Indonesian Balinese Hindu temple in Timor-Leste

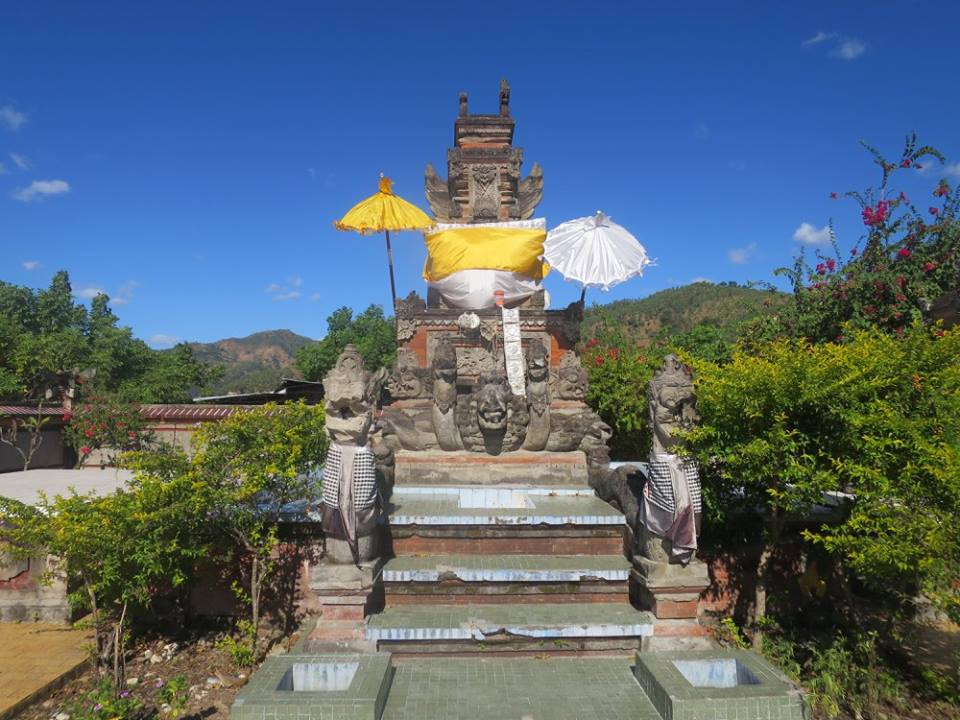

- Location within East Timor

Religion
- Affiliation: Hinduism
- District: Dili District

Location
- Location: Dili
- Country: Timor-Leste
- Interactive map of Pura Girinatha
- Coordinates: 8.5652°S 125.5960°E

Architecture
- Completed: 27 June 1987
- Temple: 1

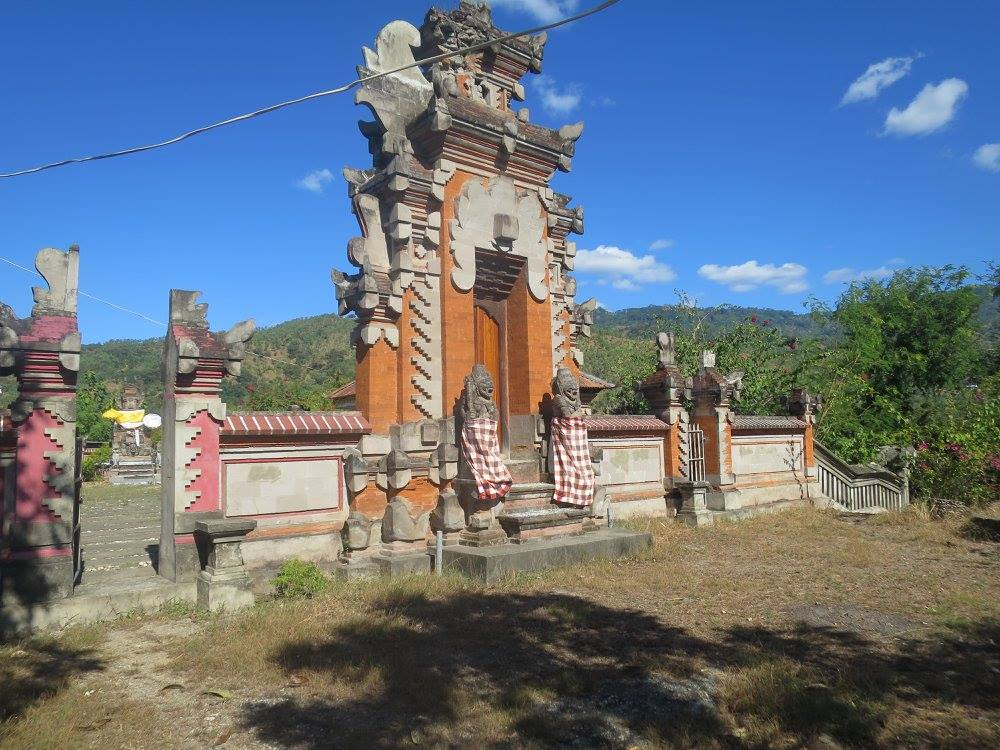
Pura Girinatha Hindu Temple of Dili in 2016

Pura Girinatha is the largest Balinese Hindu temple in Timor-Leste. It is located in the quarter Taibesi, in the south of the capital city of Dili, near the local market. The temple is located on a small hill outside the city center, but is accessible by car.

== History ==
Timor has no traditional Hindu population. The temple was built during the Indonesian occupation and was intended for the Hindu immigrants of that time, who mainly came from Bali. The inauguration took place on 27 June 1987 by Governor of East Timor Mário Viegas Carrascalão. After the end of the occupation, most Hindus left the country. In 2015, only 272 East Timorese profess Hinduism. Now the temple is quite run down, although some Balinese from Indonesian and East Timorese government has started efforts to revitalize the temple. As of January 2023, restoration was considered 90% complete.

== Gallery ==
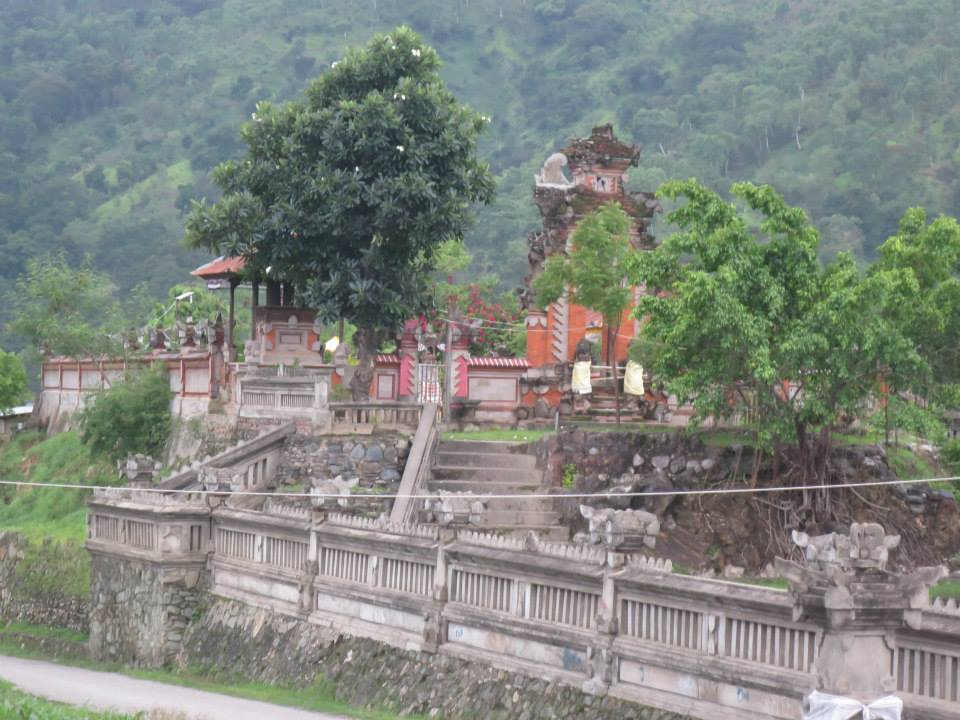
View of the temple

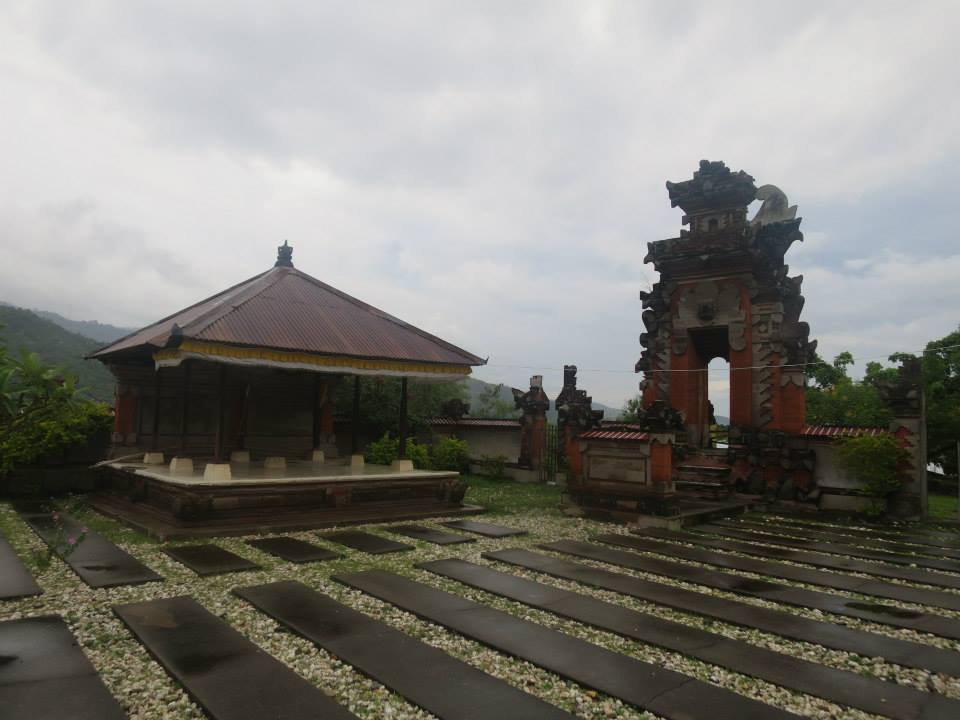

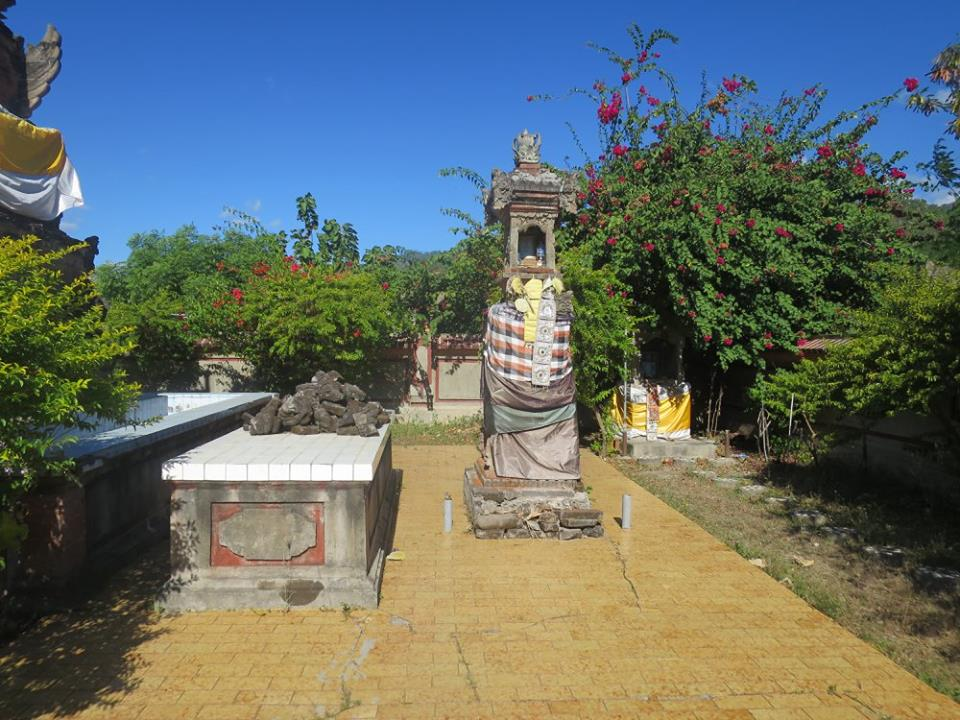

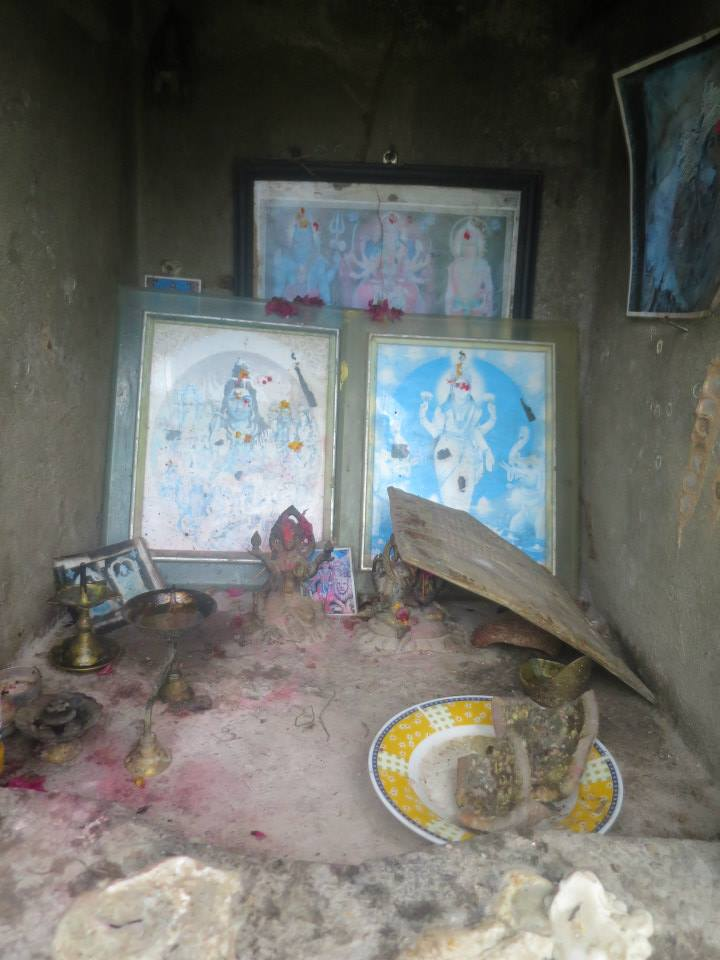

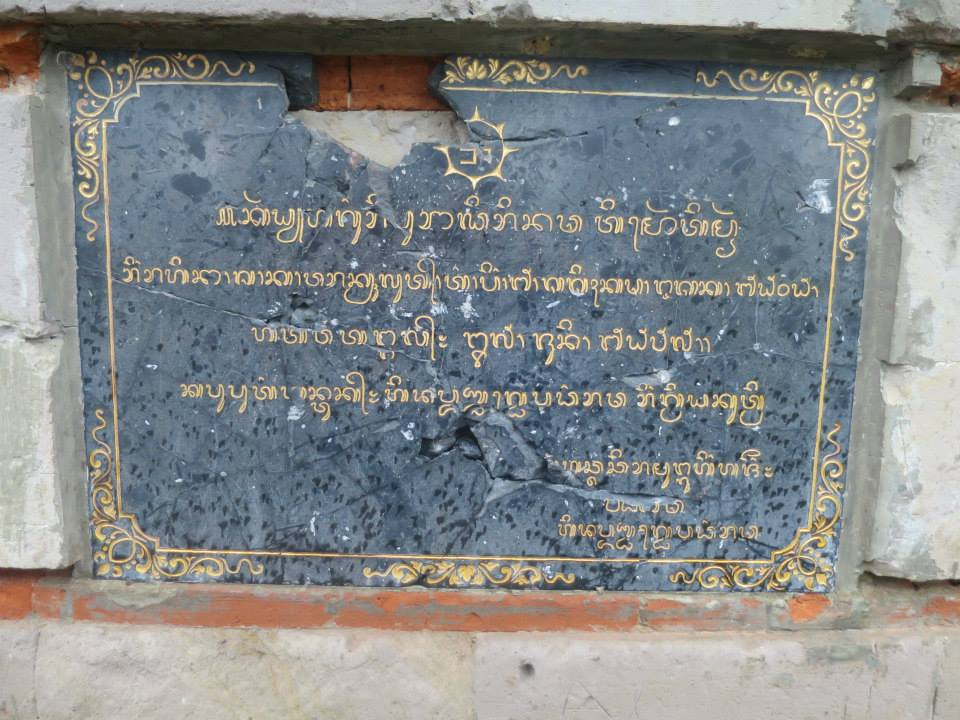

== See also ==
- Balinese Hinduism
- Hinduism in Timor-Leste
