= Colmera =

Place in Timor-Leste

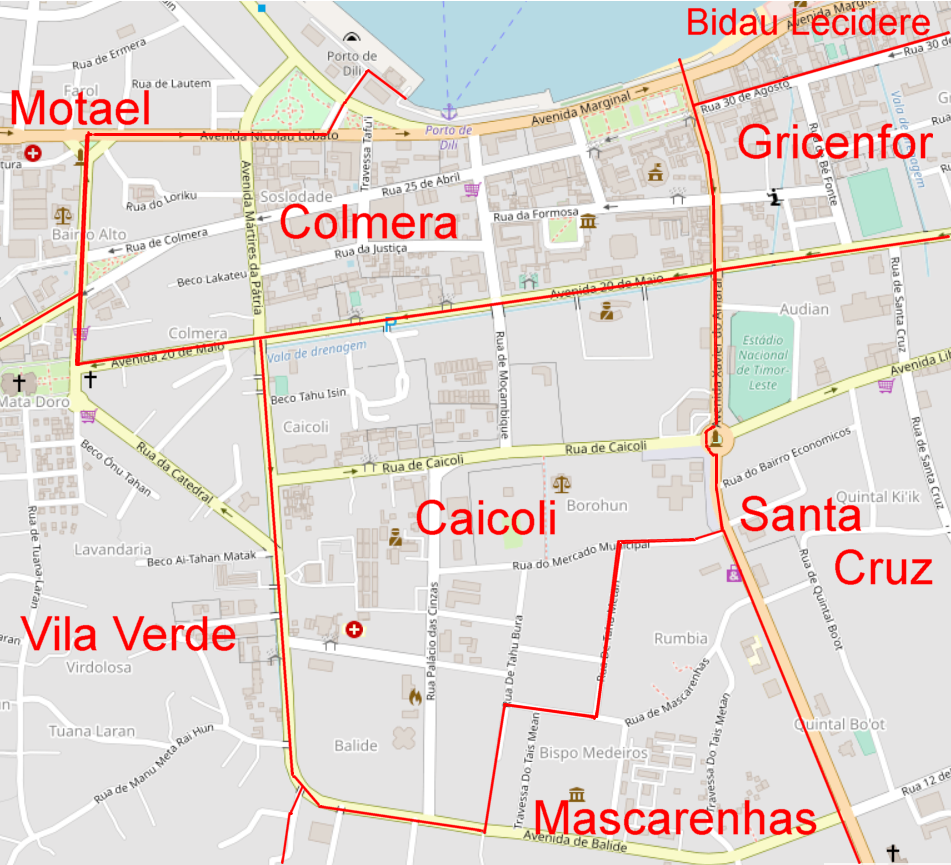
Map of Colmera.

Colmera is a Suco in Timor-Leste and a district of the state capital Dili. It is governed by the Vera Cruz Administrative Post.

== Buildings ==
- Government Palace, Dili
- Hotel Timor
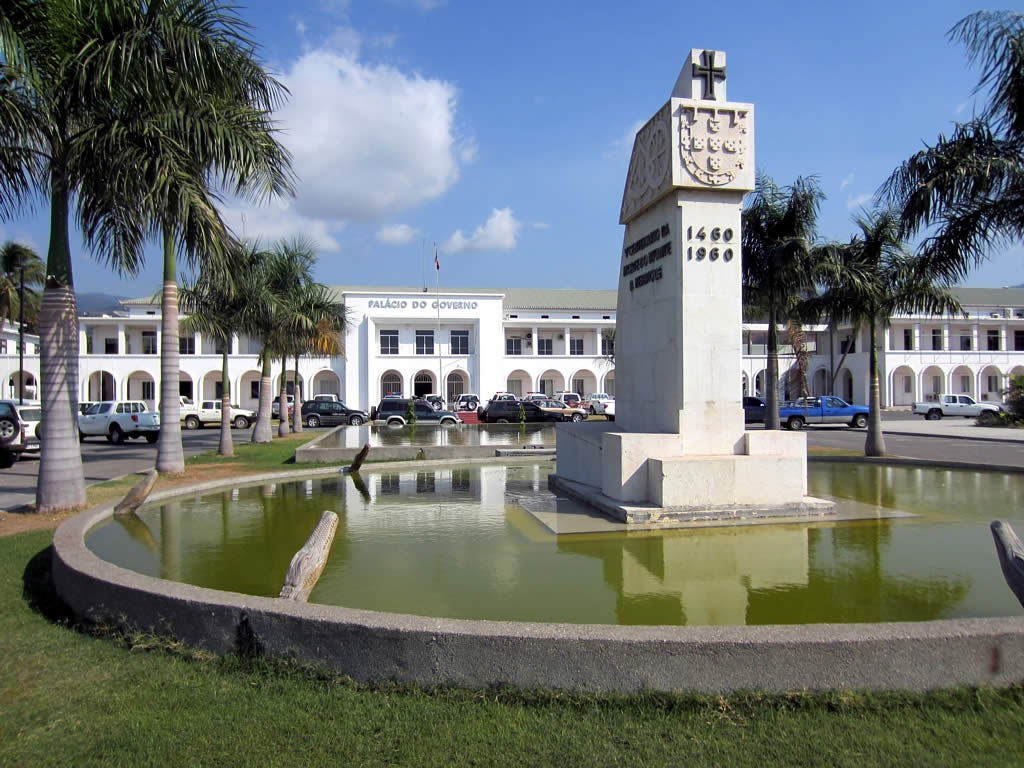
  Government Palace in Colmera.

== Politics ==
In the 2004/2005 elections, Ricardo Guterres was elected Chefe de Suco. In the 2009 elections, Armenio Aleixo da Silva won and in 2016 Armenio A. da Silva.
