= Hinduism in Timor-Leste =

Hinduism is a minority faith in Timor-Leste. Almost all of them follow Balinese Hinduism.

== History ==
Timor Island has no traditional Hindu population. Hindus are mainly migrants from Bali who came during the Indonesian occupation. After the end of the occupation, most Hindus left the country.

== Demographics ==
In 1992, before the independence of East Timor, Hindus constituted 0.5% of the population. After the occupation, Hinduism decreased to less than 0.1% in Timor-Leste. According to the 2011 census, there are 195 Hindus in Timor-Leste. However, the 2015 Census showed a slight increase in the absolute number of Hindus. According to that census, there were 271 Hindus in Timor-Leste.

== Temples ==
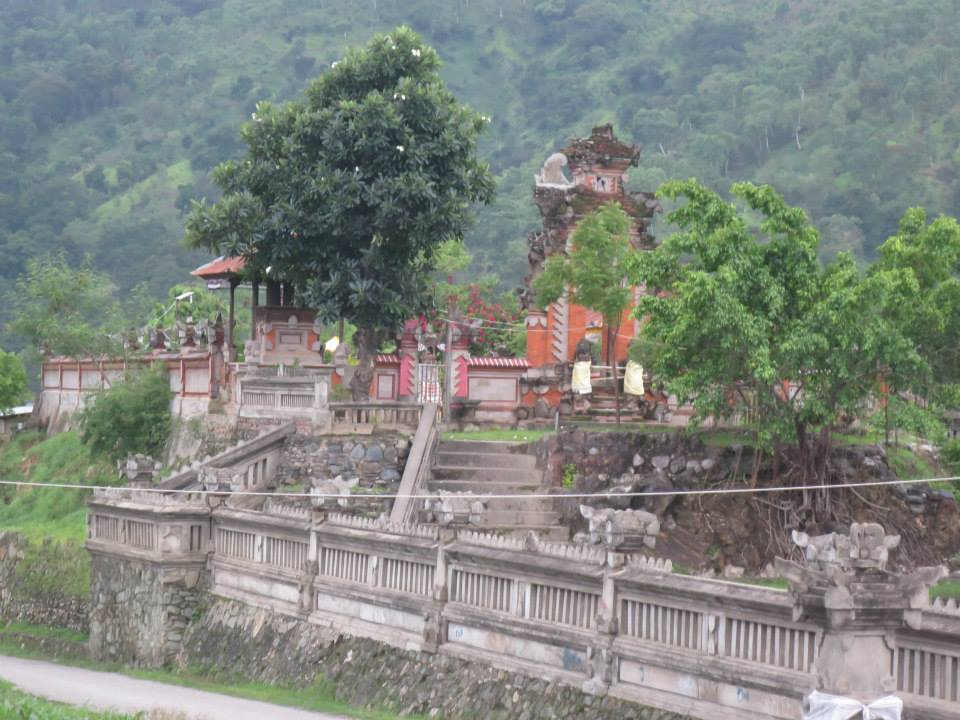
Pura Girinatha

Pura Girinatha is the largest Balinese Hindu temple in Timor-Leste. The temple was built during the Occupation. Now the temple is quite run down, although some Balinese from Indonesia and the East Timorese government have started efforts to revitalize the temple.

The Pongal celebration of the Tamil Hindus were also celebrated in the Pura Giri Natha.

== See also ==
- Pura Girinatha
