= Chinese cemetery of Dili =

Historic cemetery in Dili, Timor-Leste

Chinese Cemetery of Dili
- Tetun: Cina Rate
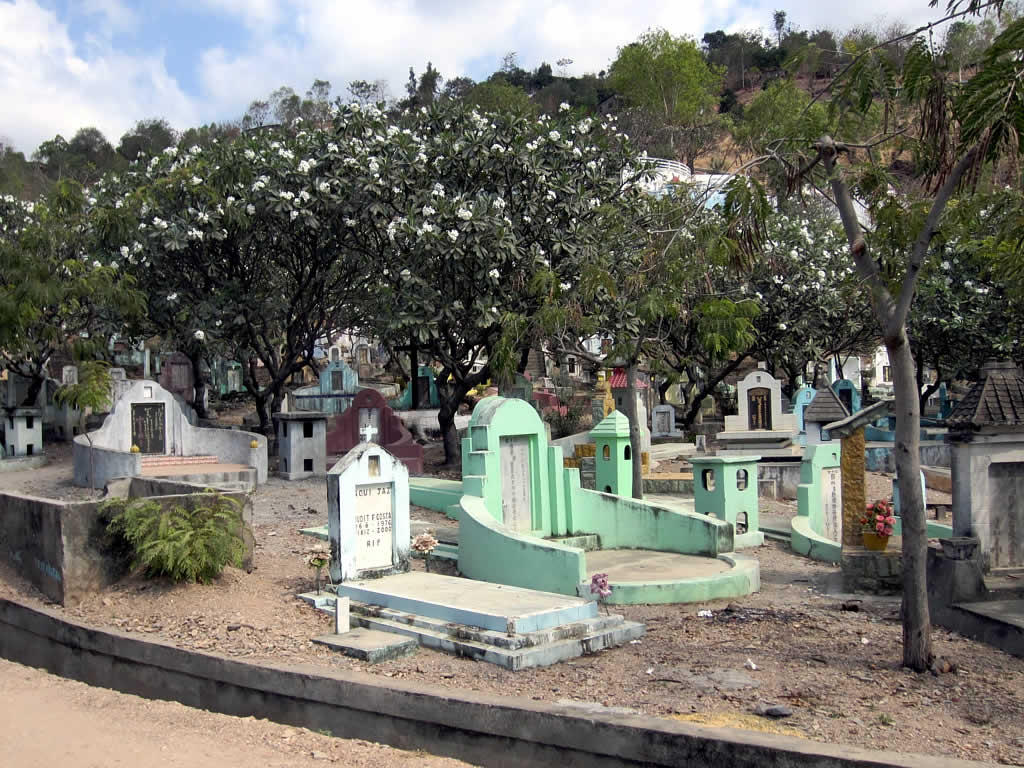
- Interactive map of Chinese Cemetery of Dili

Details
- Location: Dili
- Country: Timor-Leste
- Coordinates: 8°34′05″S 125°35′17″E

The Chinese cemetery of Dili is a historical cemetery in Dili, Timor-Leste. Built in 1889 on land donated by the then Portuguese government, the oldest graves date back to the early 20th century.

In 2015, the cemetery had about 1,400 tombs and was still maintained by the local Chinese community.

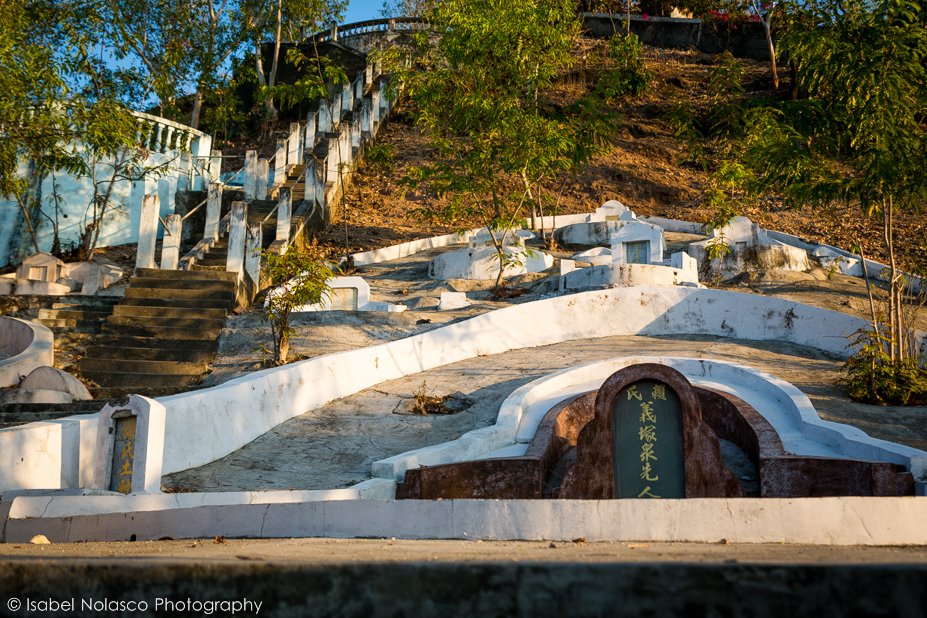

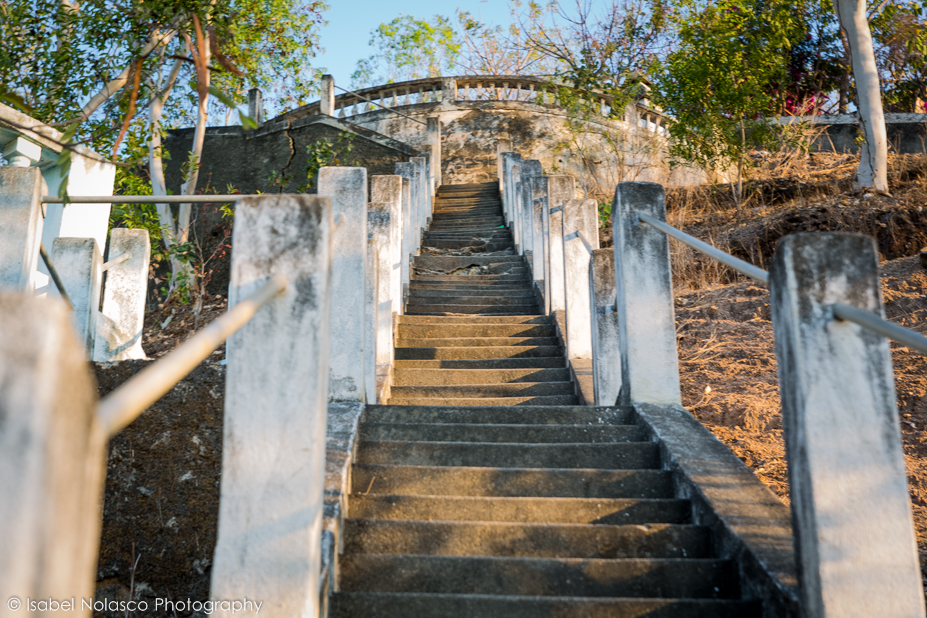

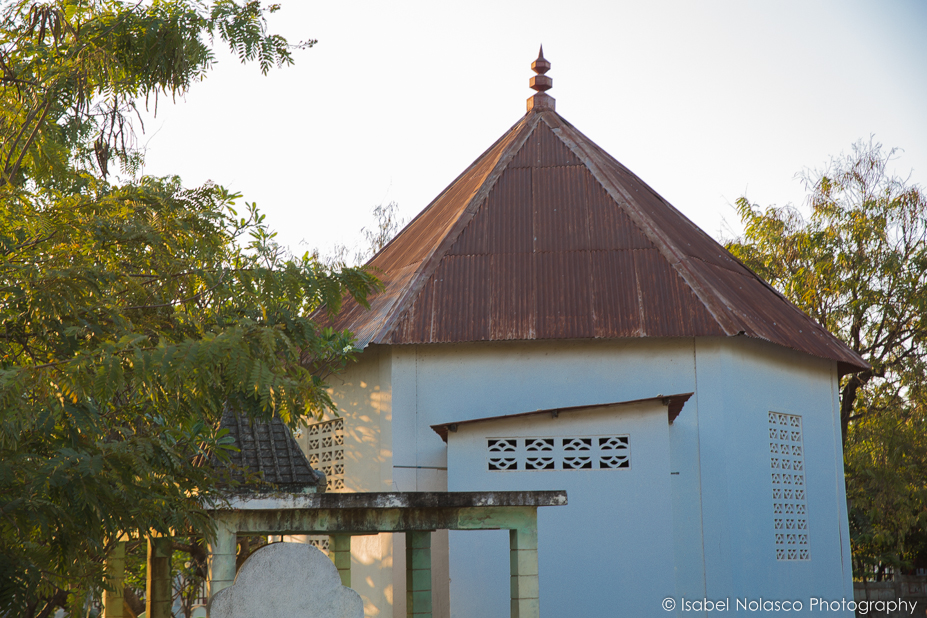

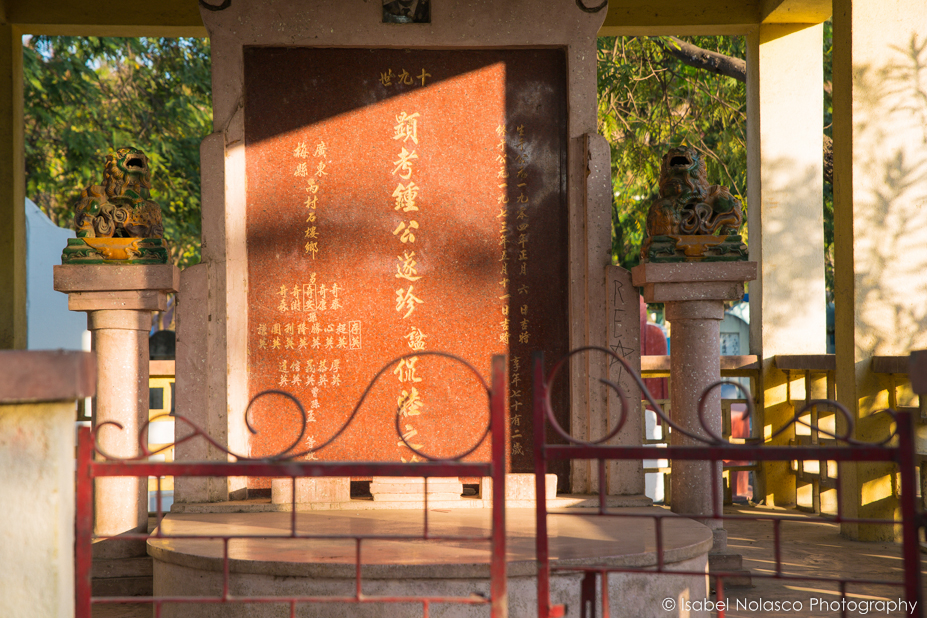
