= An-Nur Mosque (Dili) =

Mosque in Dili, Timor-Leste

- Mesquita An-Nur
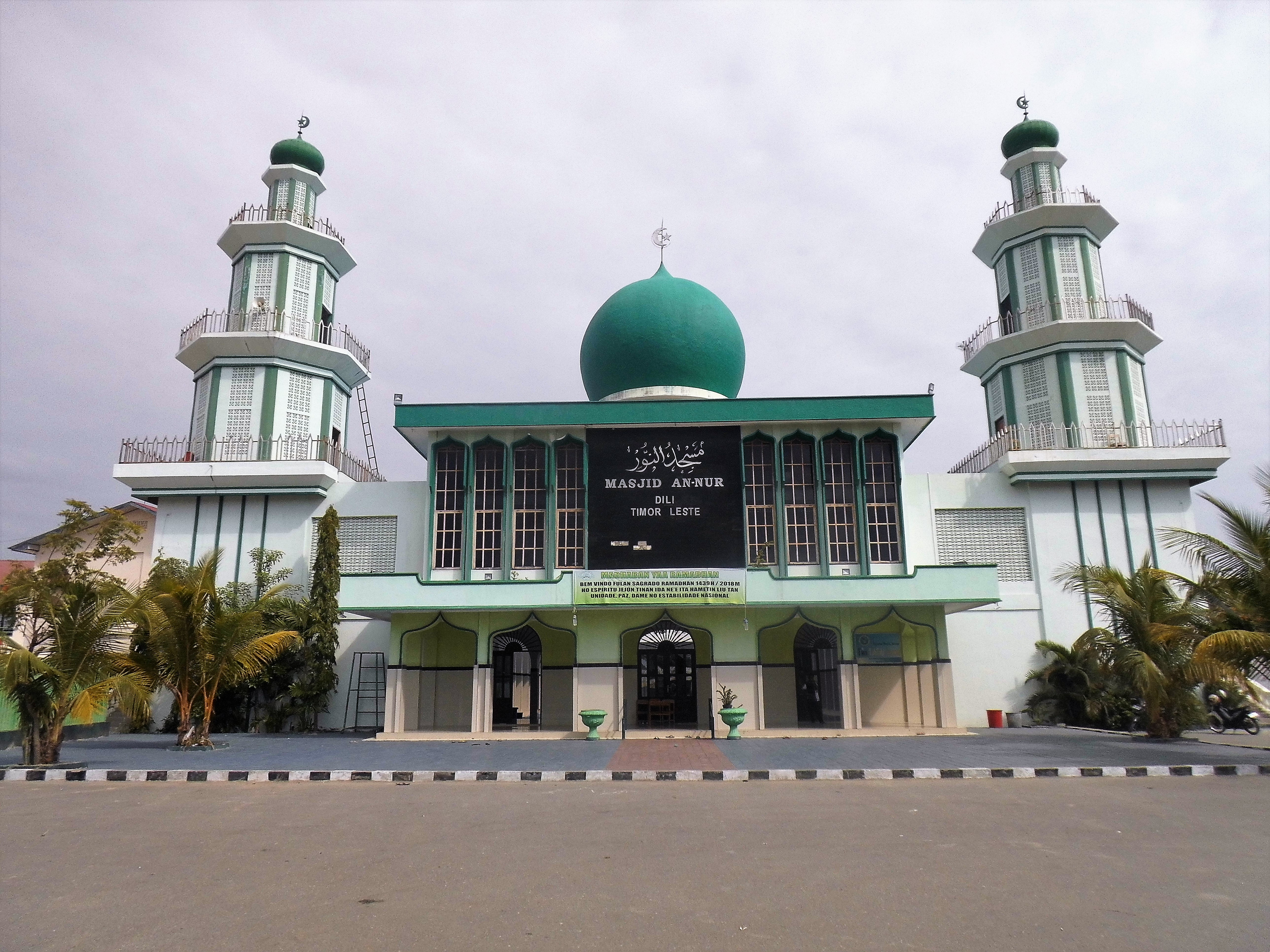

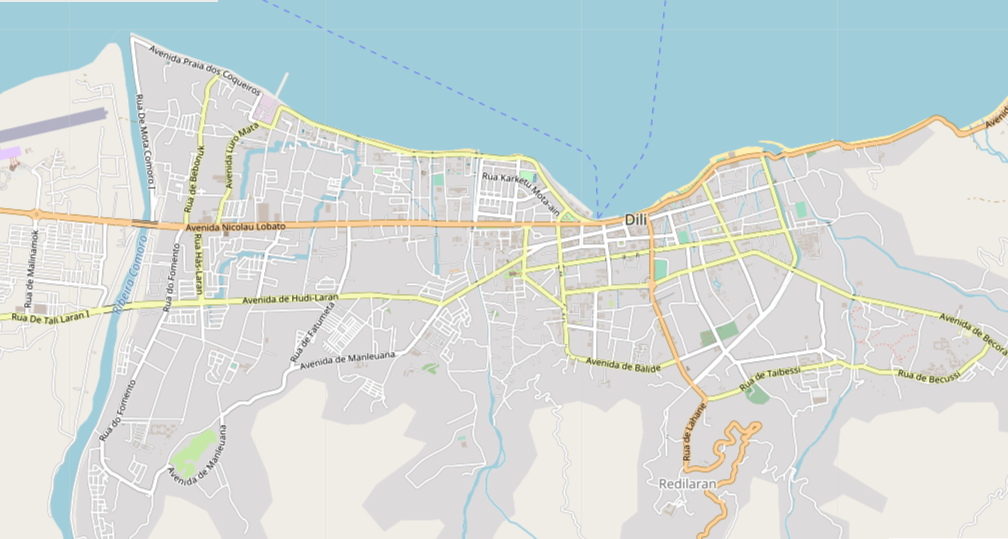
- Location within Dili

Religion
- Affiliation: Islam
- Branch/tradition: Sunni

Location
- Location: Dili, Timor-Leste
- Coordinates: 8°32′59.26″S 125°33′36.80″E

Architecture
- Type: mosque
- Established: 1955

The An-Nur Mosque (Portuguese: Mesquita An-Nur) is a mosque in Alor Village, Dili, Timor-Leste.

== History ==
The mosque was originally constructed in 1955 with the initiative from Hasan Bin Abdulah Balatif, the head of Alor Village. On 20 March 1981, the mosque underwent renovation.

== Architecture ==
The mosque consists of two floors, in which the ground floor is the main prayer hall and the upper floor is a school.

== Gallery ==
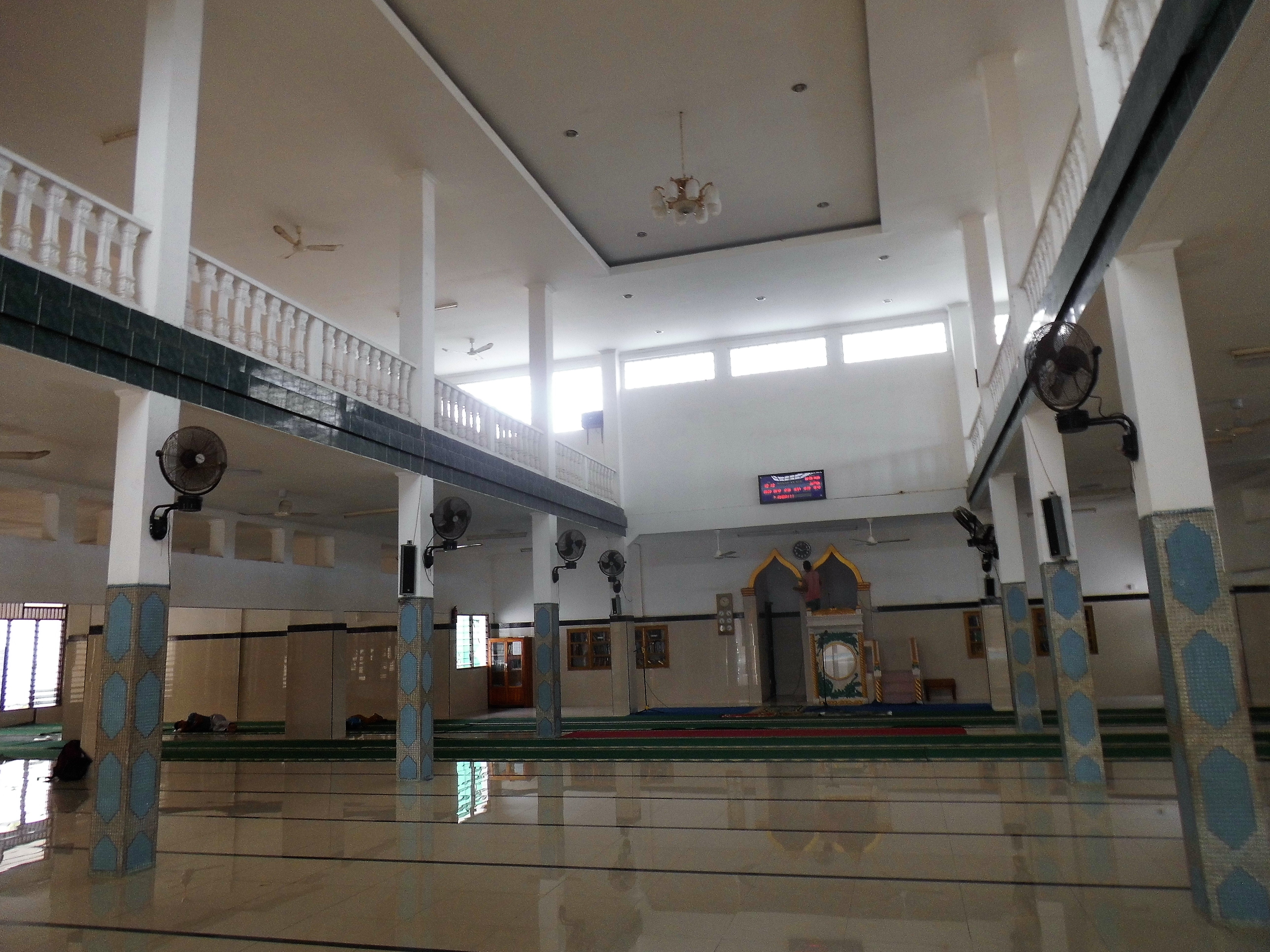
Prayer hall

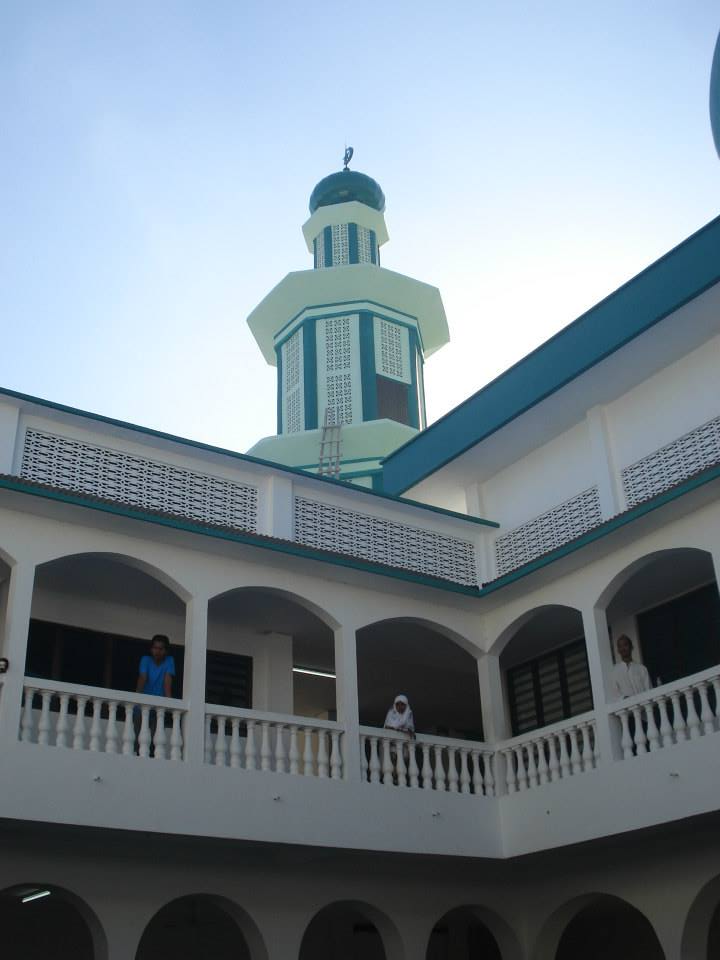
Inner courtyard of the mosque

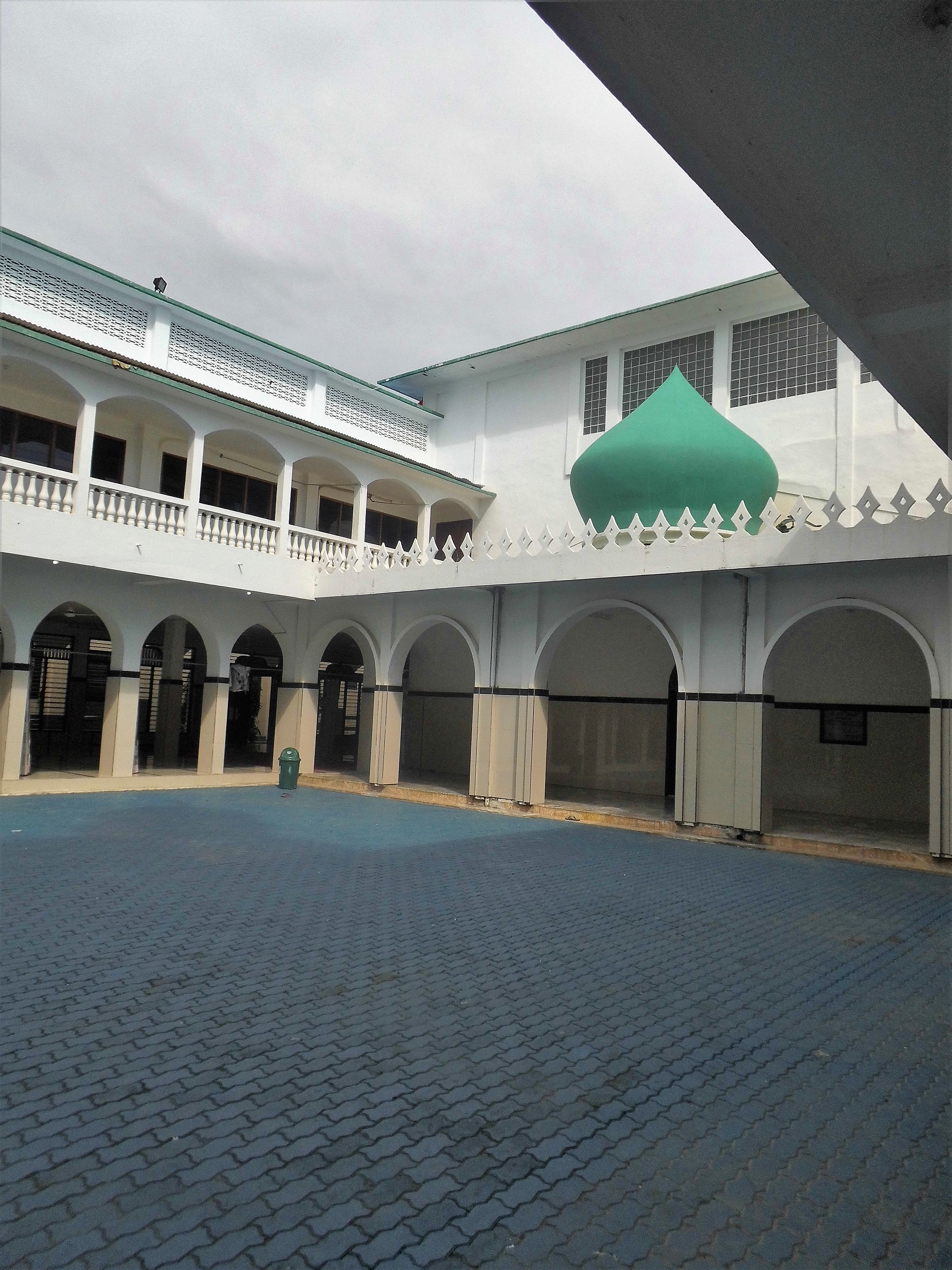
Inner courtyard of the mosque

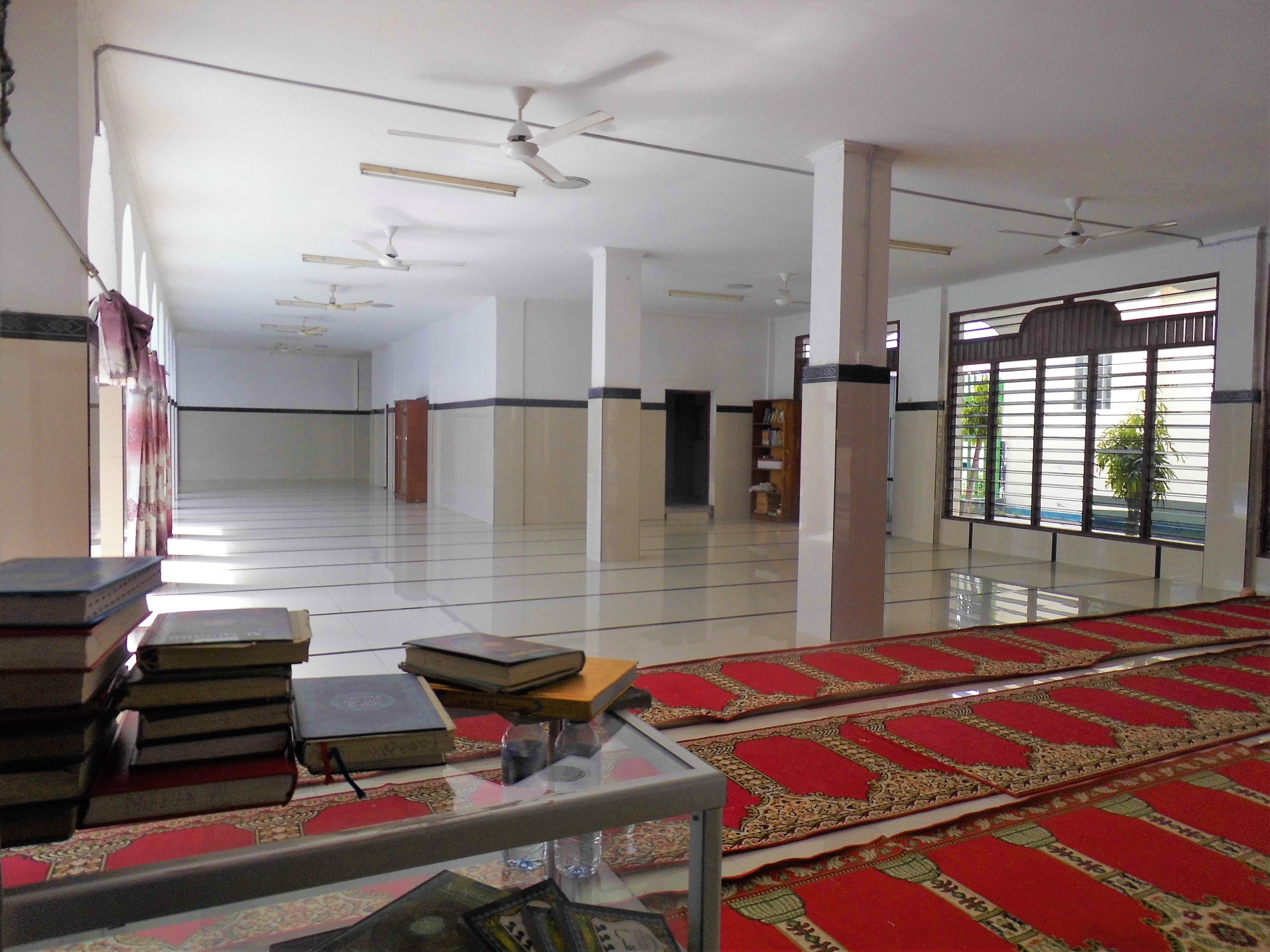

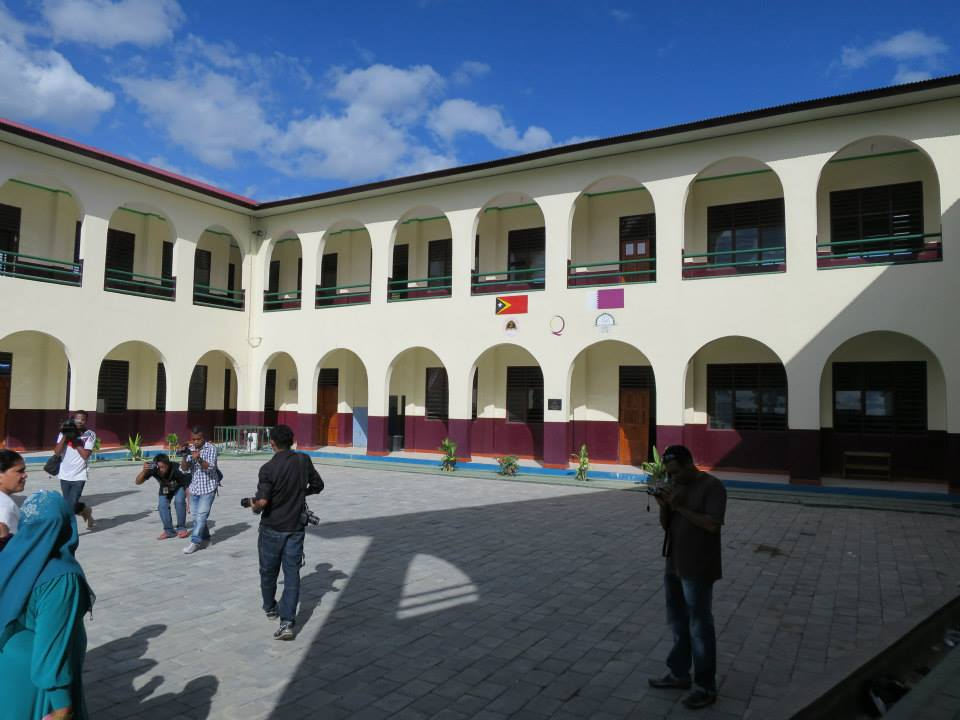
Mosque school

== See also ==
- Islam in Timor-Leste
