= Chinese Temple of Dili =

- Cina Maromak
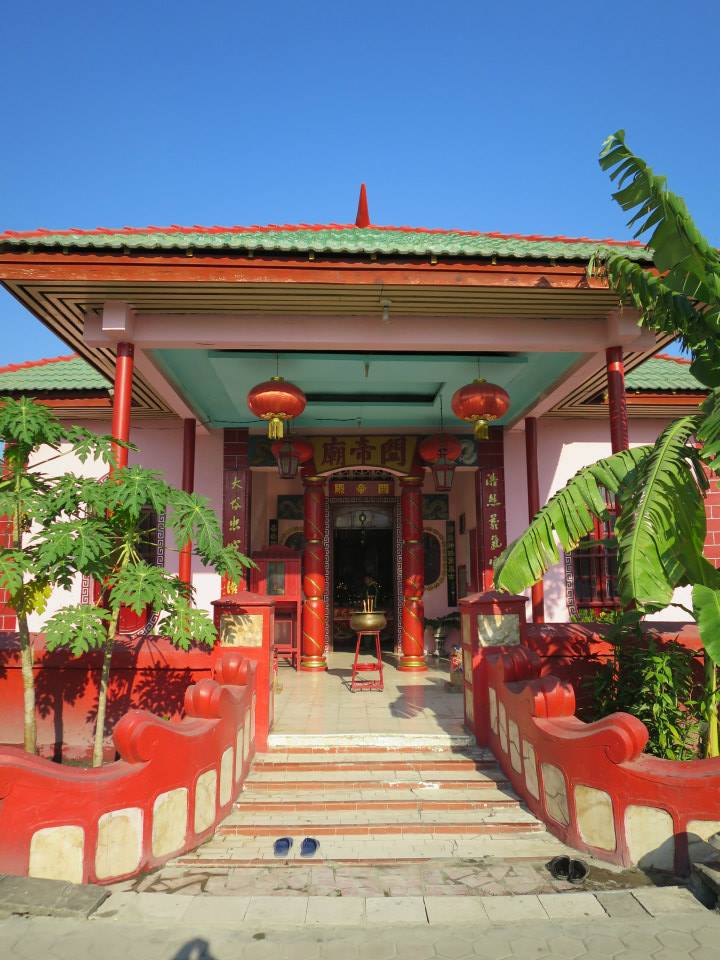
- Entrance of the temple

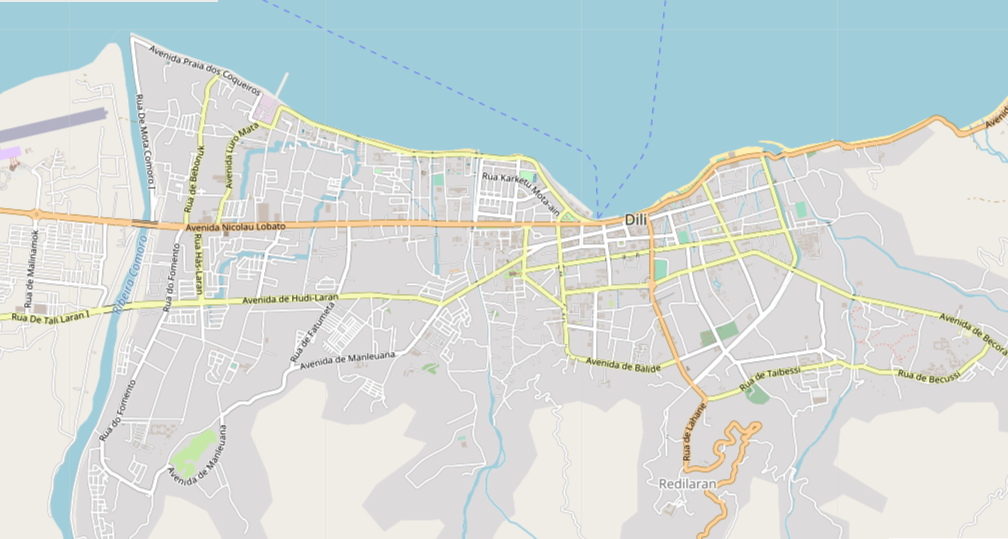
- Location within Dili

Religion
- Affiliation: Taoism、Buddhism、Chinese folk religion

Location
- Municipality: Dili
- Country: Timor-Leste
- Coordinates: 8.5551347°S 125.5804497°E

Architecture
- Completed: 1928

The Chinese Temple of Dili is a temple used by the Chinese diaspora of Dili, Timor-Leste. The temple was built in 1928, during the Portuguese control of East Timor, and is still in use today.

The main shrine of the temple is dedicated to Lord Guan, a historical Chinese general from the 3rd century, who is popularly worshipped in Chinese folk religion, Confucianism, and Chinese Buddhism. Another room is dedicated to Guan Yin, a bodhisattva venerated in Chinese folk religion.

== History ==
In 1926, the Chinese community who migrated from Macau set up a shrine in a garage where they worshipped a 30 cm high statue of Guan Gong that had been sent from China. In 1928, after getting funding from both the Portuguese government and the Chinese diaspora, they built the current temple and enshrined the statue inside the temple. The Guan Di temple was believed to have been built in 1936 or 1937. A shrine dedicated to Guan Yin was built in 1977. The temple survived the Japanese occupation during World War II and the Indonesian occupation without being vandalized.

The temple grew out of a community that expanded in the 19th century, when steamship voyages between Dili and Macau increased migration, and Chinese schools and societies began to flourish around it. It has functioned as a center of mutual support. According to the temple's guardian, the community covers funeral costs for members who cannot afford them, a sign of how close-knit Dili's Chinese families are.

Many Chinese-Timorese families also practice Catholicism, and some attend both the temple and Sunday church services. The community's size has shrunk sharply since the 20th century. Timor-Leste's conflicts in 1975, 1999 and 2006 saw Chinese-Timorese singled out for being different, and classrooms that were once about 95 percent Chinese-Timorese now have only one or two such students. Some Chinese Timorese who left have returned since 1999 to reclaim ancestral property and apply for Timorese passports. The community today is estimated at anywhere between 500 and 3,000 people, depending on whether one counts Chinese mother-tongue speakers or the immigration department's estimate of legal and illegal Chinese residents.
