= Caraulun River =

River in Timor-Leste

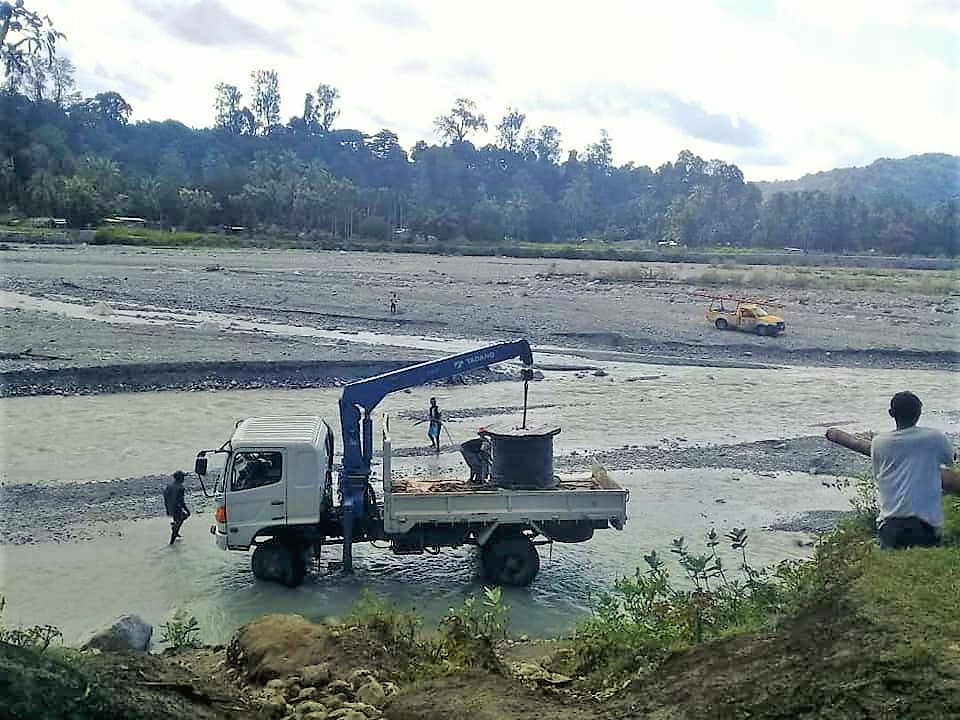
- Public works in the river in Suco Daisua, Same, Manufahi

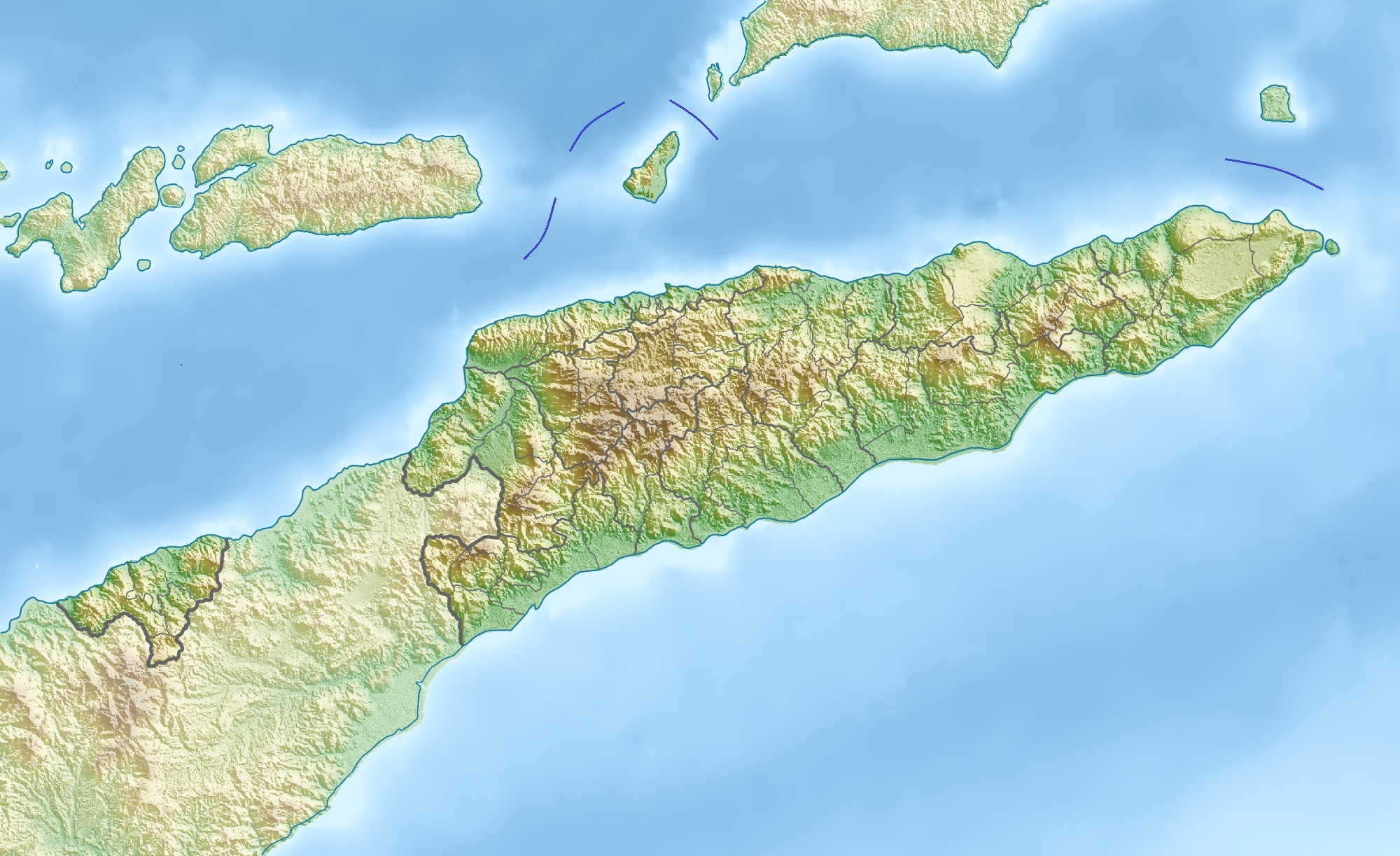
- Location of river mouth
- Native name: Ribeira Caraulun /; Rio Caraulun (Portuguese); Mota Caraulun /; Mota Karaulun (Tetum)

Location
- Country: Timor-Leste
- Municipalities: Ainaro; Manufahi

Physical characteristics
- Source confluence
  - location: Ainaro / Manufahi border
  - coordinates: 8°54′10″S 125°40′36″E
- Mouth: Timor Sea
  - location: Betano, Manufahi
  - coordinates: 9°11′39″S 125°42′02″E
- Basin size: ~ 580 km^{2} (220 sq mi)

Basin features
- Tributaries
  - left: Markis River, Sui River
  - right: Colihuno River, Emerin River, Caloco River, Asa (or Aiasa) River

The Caraulun River (Portuguese: Ribeira Caraulun or Rio Caraulun, Tetum: Mota Caraulun or Mota Karaulun) is a river in Timor-Leste. It flows for the most part in a southerly direction, forms the southern part of the border between Ainaro and Manufahi municipalities, and discharges into the Timor Sea.

== Etymology ==
The river's name has its origins in the Tetum expression Karau Ulun, which means buffalo head. The river itself is said to resemble buffalo horns. According to anthropologist Matthew Libbis:

"The local story is that two boys were thirsty and went looking for water. A dog led them to a buffalo head in the ground. When they pulled it out, a spring emerged and increased in flow until it became the river that now runs to the sea."

Libbis went on to observe that there was another version of the story, involving two brothers, one of whom thrust a spear causing a spring to gush forth from the ground. In that version, the two brothers represented a division between earth and sky, with the older brother belonging in the mountains.

== Course ==
The headwaters of the river are in the portion of Timor-Leste's central mountains ranging from just to the south of Maubisse in Ainaro municipality to just to the south of Turiscai in Manufahi municipality.

For the most part, the river and its tributaries flow in a southerly direction, mainly through the latter of those two municipalities, until the river and its tributary the Asa (or Aiasa) River reach the southern tip of Suco Daisua in Manufahi. There, at the tripoint between Ainaro municipality and the two sucos of Daisua and Betano in Manufahi municipality, the tributary enters the river. From the tripoint, the river continues generally in a southerly direction, and forms the border between the two municipalities, until it discharges into the Timor Sea 5 km (3.1 mi) west of Betano.

The river's main channel is one of the four perennial streams in Manufahi. Additionally, it is one of only eight such watercourses in southern Timor-Leste that can potentially be inhabited by saltwater crocodiles all year round (the others being the Bebui, Belulik, Clerec, Dilor, Irabere, South Laclo, and Tafara rivers). After periods of heavy rain, its discharge can be very high.

The main channel is also braided, as are the lower sections of its primary tributaries. Its lower reaches are located within Manufahi's principal population centre, the Same administrative post, which also includes the municipality's capital city, Same, and most of its actively utilised irrigated rice paddies.

At the river's mouth, from which the grade over the first 10 km (6.2 mi) into the Timor Sea is only about 1 in 20 or 5%, the river has formed a delta, even though the wave climate is quite energetic. In that respect, the river is similar to most of the other rivers on the south coast, and differs from some on the north coast (such as the North Laclo River, where the grade over the same distance from the mouth is very steep, a near-constant slope of about 1 in 5 or 20%).

Satellite imagery taken between 1986 and 2006 indicates that the total area of the delta did not change very much over the intervening period, but that some parts of the coastline at the delta had varied markedly. In 2004–2005, a major rainy season flood caused a substantial avulsion or change in the course of the river through the delta. Several hundred hectares of rice paddies were destroyed, and the river reoccupied an old river channel about 100 m (330 ft) wide and several hundred metres to the west.

During the rainy season, plumes emerging from the river into the Timor Sea are carried both east and west by currents.

The river's main tributaries, in order of entrance, are as follows:

- Colihuno River: rises in northern Ainaro municipality south of Maubisse; flows initially eastwards and then southeastwards to form part of the border between Ainaro and Manufahi municipalities, and then, also at that border, merges with the Markis River (see below) to form the Caraulun River.
- Markis River: rises in northern Manufahi municipality; flows initially westwards and then generally southwards, forms part of the border between Ainaro and Manufahi municipalities, and then, also at that border, merges with the Colihuno River (see above) to form the Caraulun River.
- Emerin River (or Ermetin River): rises in western Manufahi municipality on the northern outskirts of Same; flows southeastwards to enter the Caraulun River southeast of Same.
- Caloco River: rises in western Manufahi municipality a short distance south of Same; flows southeast to enter the Caraulun River a little further southeast of Same.
- Sui River: rises mainly in northern Manufahi municipality near and south of Turiscai in the form of a number of sub-tributaries (some of which rise in Ainaro municipality); flows generally southwards, mostly forming parts of the borders between various sucos and administrative posts in Manufahi municipality, and then enters the Caraulun River near the border between Sucos Babulu and Daisua.
- Asa River (or Aiasa River): rises in western Manufahi municipality west of Same; flows generally southeastwards, mostly forming part of the border between Ainaro and Manufahi municipalities, and then enters the Caraulun River at the southern tip of Suco Daisua in Manufahi.

== History ==
The historical relationships forming the political community in Manufahi have been affected by an awareness of its association with the river's catchment or drainage basin. One ritual name for the municipality is Be ulun Cablaki, an expression referring to 'the headwaters and the mountain' of the catchment. Cablaki is the mountain range that forms the boundary between Manufahi and Ainaro municipality to its north (expressed ritually as Cablaki-Taradayi).

Traditionally, the region's political organisation was a diarchy known as the be ulun and be ain ('head' and 'foot') of the land. The two diarchical rulers or Liurai were later given the title of Tenente Coronel by the Portuguese colonial government. The highland Liurai lived at Kota lala in the hamlet of Tomanamo (part of the village of Letefoho) at the headwaters and mountain (foho) of the catchment, and was known as Liurai Malai. The lowland Liurai, who lived at the foot of the river, was Liurai 'Dom' Boaventura.

The relationship between the diarchical Liurai also involved a marriage alliance, known as Umane:Feto sawa, according to which the highland ruling clan's daughters were given to the lowland ruler in marriage. Even in the 21st century, these traditional relationships and ritual exchange obligations remain significant.

During the Indonesian occupation of East Timor from 1975, the river was one of a number of rivers in the then-Indonesian province of Timor Timur (transl. East Timor) that played an important role in the Timorese resistance. It was strategically important not only because it provided resources to guerillas, but also because towns and villages were located on its banks.

Also during that period, there were major changes in land use patterns. To counter armed resistance by the people of the catchment, the Indonesians gradually directed the scattered highland communities to move into concentrated settlements near the main population centres, ostensibly for security reasons. The principal camps for the relocated communities were at Turiscai, Maubisse, Alas, Fatuberliu, Same and Betano. By 1983, all settlements in the catchment were clustered around these places and forced to cultivate the areas surrounding them. Although that process reduced pressures on more distant areas, it caused increased clearing and erosion near the settlements. Eventually, by 1992, communities had been permitted to return to their original homelands.

Meanwhile, the Indonesian occupiers attempted to reinstate the boundaries of the area's Portuguese-implemented permanent forest reserve system. However, a growing local population has combined with the erosion of traditional protocols to place pressures on land resources in the area, leading to deforestation and increased clearing of the forest zone.

Between 1986 and 2006, the catchment lost 40 km^{2} (15 sq mi) (or about 7%) of its dense vegetation, with nearly all of the loss occurring by 1996. There were several possible causes for the loss. In the upper and middle catchment, the Indonesians engaged in large scale logging, and the military burned substantial areas of forest as part of the relocation policy. Additionally, relocated families may have cleared vegetation, both when they were living in the new settlements and after they returned home. The reduction in vegetation loss after 1996 may have been due to natural rehabilitation following the cessation of wholesale logging and burning.

In the lower catchment, around Betano, vegetation loss was probably due to the expansion and development of rice paddies and also the town, along with flooding and the avulsion in the river delta. During the Indonesian occupation, transmigrants were relocated from other parts of Indonesia and Timor Timur to work in the rice paddies. By 1996, the Indonesians had constructed a weir about 20 km (12 mi) south of Same to irrigate the rice paddies. In 1999, most of the transmigrants left the area, and in 2000 the irrigation works were destroyed by a large flood. Although the works were repaired by 2006/2007, fewer people were available to cultivate the agricultural plots in the area, and productivity reduced.

== Catchment ==
The river's catchment is one of the 10 major catchments in Timor-Leste. It is approximately 580 km^{2} (220 sq mi) in area, and is divided between the Manufahi and Ainaro municipalities. Its main population centres, from north to south, are Maubisse, Same, and Betano.

Timor-Leste has been broadly divided into twelve 'hydrologic units', groupings of climatologically and physiographically similar and adjacent river catchments. The Caraulun River catchment is one of the four major ones in the Clere & Belulic hydrologic unit, which is about 1,923.6 km^{2} (742.7 sq mi) in total area and covers 12.9% of the country; the others are the catchments of the Belulik, Clerec, and South Laclo rivers.

The uplands of the Caralaun River catchment near Maubisse were originally vegetated with grass, and on high ground there were Eucalyptus trees. In the final years of the Portuguese colonial era between 1963 and 1975, Casuarina seedlings were planted as shade trees for coffee plants. During the ensuing Indonesian occupation, many trees were removed, and local people were encouraged to grow both Casuarinas and coffee plants. However, they more commonly planted Acacia trees, which controlled erosion and landslides. By the early twenty first century, tree planting had stopped due to a lack of local support and problems with fire. Other upland areas near Turiscai and Same have been subject to deforestation, but removal of trees has not been uniform across the catchment.

Since the Portuguese colonial era, there has been much erosion (denudation), many landslides and some gullying in the catchment, especially after tree removal or heavy rainfall. Soil loss has been moderate to high in the upper catchment, especially in the north west, but low in the lower catchment. Some local people regard shifting agriculture as a cause of severe erosion; others consider it to be a 'non-problem'. The greatest source of river sediment is landsliding (48%; with 14% earthquake-induced); of lesser significance are bank erosion (34%), and sheet and rill erosion (17%). In the uplands, some river channels have widened (and a few have deepened). Downstream, the river has widened and become shallower, leading to greater flooding, riverbank erosion, and lateral movement of flow paths. Riverbank erosion has become a serious problem.

A 2012 study concluded that erosion of the catchment had recently become up to 20 times higher than over the last few thousand years. According to the report of the study, the most likely reason for the increased erosion was land use. In particular, the removal of vegetation from riverbanks (riparian zones) had caused widespread erosion, and its removal from hill slopes had promoted landslides. By increasing the river's sediment load, the greater catchment erosion had made the river shallower and wider, and thus increased the erosion of its riverbanks. The latter erosion, in turn, had led to bridge collapse and road damage. Additionally, the two forms of erosion had combined to increase flooding in the river, and, by making its channels wider and braided, had caused its flows to become more erratic.

At that time, the consensus among local people was that the traditional local Tara Bandu rules that had been applied to control use of the catchment had broken down during the Indonesian occupation, and needed to be reinstated. In particular, the application of Tara Bandu was said to be required to limit tree removal, prevent farming along rivers and regulate freshwater fishing. Reforestation was also thought by many to be necessary, although in some areas of the catchment the growing of trees would cause tension with the interests of graziers.

All of Timor-Leste's catchments are exposed to a monsoon type climate, with a clear distinction between just two seasons, rainy and dry. The Caraulun catchment has a bimodal rainfall pattern, with two rainfall peaks: approximately from November to March, and from May to June. In the upper catchment, average annual temperatures are below 24 °C, and at the coast they are above 24 °C. Rainfall varies from around 3,000 mm (120 in) per annum at the Cablac Mountain Range to 1,400 mm (55 in) per annum at Betano on the coast.

== Geology ==
Timor is the deformed northern margin of the Australian continent, where Australia is colliding with the Banda Arc. Long term tectonic uplift rates have been estimated at 1.5 to 2 mm/annum, and rocks from both sides of the collision can be found throughout the island.

East Timorese rock types include a variety of deformed deep marine and shallow-marine sedimentary and volcanic rocks, and metamorphic core complexes. The catchment has four soil orders:

- Entisols: derived mostly from alluvial materials, and with little or no horizon development;
- Inceptisols: young, formed from alluvial and colluvial materials, and with limited profile development;
- Mollisols: prairie soils formed from calcareous and colluvial parent material, with a dark surface horizon; and
- Vertisols: dark clay soils formed typically from basic rocks.

In the upper catchment, the dominant soils are Mollisols, Entisols, and Vertisols; the lower catchment soils are predominantly Vertisols, Entisols, and Inceptisols.

== Economy ==
=== Agriculture ===
The uplands of the catchment have significant agricultural production. In the catchment's higher reaches, including the foothills of Mount Cablac, coffee is cultivated under canopies of Casuarina (Casuarina junghuhniana) shade trees, and candlenut (Aleurites moluccanus) and other tree crops are also grown. Throughout the highlands, and especially in the Turiscai and Fatuberliu administrative posts, scattered rural communities engage in near subsistence cultivation of food crops, with up to around 40% of the area of Manufahi municipality being utilised for food crop production.

The municipality produces maize in all four of its administrative posts. In the river's lower reaches within the Same administrative post, and especially at Betano, rice production is important. There are irrigated rice paddies in a number of sucos near Same, and also at Betano. In 2000, the catchment's irrigation scheme had a designated area of 2,196 ha (5,430 acres), of which only 600 ha (1,500 acres) was functional. As of the early 2010s, the Betano irrigation infrastructure was undergoing substantial rehabilitation, which was intended to facilitate an expansion of the area planted to irrigated rice. Beans, vegetables and fruits were also being produced in the municipality, along with other horticulture crops such as sweet potato and cassava.

Land management and access in Manufahi are based on informal or customary practices. Forms of share cropping and leasing arrangements are negotiated, but there is no significant real estate market. Land is inherited by maternal descent associated with the respective uma lisan (origin groups or clans) who hold traditional jurisdiction. Entitlements to land are transferred from mothers to daughters; men marry out of their uma lisan and cultivate their wives' land, while retaining some responsibilities towards their mother's and sisters' land.

=== City water supply ===
As of 2000, the catchment provided the three sources of the water supply system for the city of Same. The three intakes of the system were Carbulau (Darelau), about 6 km (3.7 mi) north of the city, in a small stream; Kotalala, about 3 km (1.9 mi) northwest of the city, in a small braided channel system of a tributary stream to the Uelala River; and Merbati, about 1 km (0.62 mi) west of Kotalala in a stream flowing from a spring as another tributary to the Uelala River. The water supply system was made up mainly of galvanised steel pipes, and included several reservoirs and concrete break pressure tanks.

=== Fishing ===
Ika ki'ik (small freshwater fish) are caught in the catchment's rivers near Same, and also further downstream along with boik (prawns). During the Portuguese colonial era, local Tara Bandu rules were applied to regulate fishing in the catchment, but the use of those rules broke down during the Indonesian occupation. By the early 2010s, the catchment had fewer species and numbers of fish, and the fish and prawns in the lower reaches of the river were small. A likely cause of the reduction in species and numbers was habitat change due to riverbed sedimentation.

Just outside the river mouth, small pelagic species of fish such as Kombo (Rastrelliger) and sardines (Sardinella) can be caught in the estuaries and at the beach, where the fishing is at its best during floods. Nutrients supplied by the river to the surf zone near the beach may promote growth of phytoplankton, which attracts fish, and nutrients may also be released by disturbance of offshore mud by the river. During the eastern monsoon between May and July, large tasi bo’ot ('sea swells'), waves and sea currents surge along the coast and restrict fishing activity.

The numbers of fish caught in the surf zone near the river mouth appear not to have been reduced by the effects of the Indonesian occupation, although the large fish are less plentiful than before. During the 1990s, the Indonesian army damaged offshore coral reefs by using dynamite to catch fish, and that may have caused the reduction in numbers of large fish in the surf zone. Further damage to the coral was caused by sand accumulation. By the early 2010s, the reefs were recovering.

=== Industry ===
A site 7 km (4.3 mi) inland of Betano has been identified as the location of a proposed Betano petroleum refinery and petrochemicals complex, which would be part of the Tasi Mane south coast petroleum project. The site, which would be named Nova Betano and also host a new town if the proposed facility were constructed, abuts the eastern shore of the river, and is in a high flood risk region. The proposed facility, if constructed, may therefore require flood protection works, a suitable setback, or both.

== See also ==
- List of rivers of Timor-Leste
