= List of cities, towns and villages in Timor-Leste =

Map of Timor-Leste

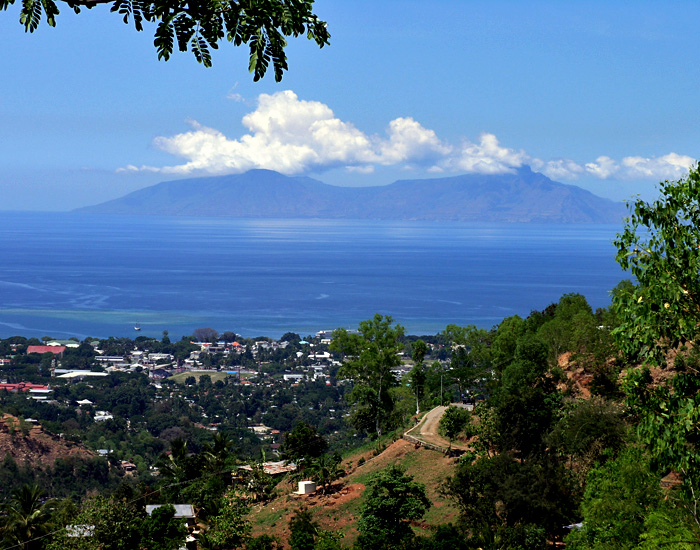
Dili, Capital of Timor-Leste

This is a list of cities, towns, and villages in Timor-Leste.

- Aileu District
  - Aileu
- Ainaro District
  - Ainaro
  - Hato-Udo
  - Maubara
  - Maubisse
- Baucau District
  - Baguia
  - Baucau 14,960
  - Bucoli
  - Laga
  - Macadai de Baixo
  - Quelicai
  - Venilale
- Bobonaro District
  - Atabae
  - Balibo
  - Bobonaro
  - Lolotoe
  - Maliana
- Cova Lima District
  - Fatululik
  - Fohoren
  - Suai 9,866
  - Tilomar
  - Zumalai
- Dili District
  - Dare
  - Dili 222,323
  - Metinaro
- Ermera District
  - Atsabe
  - Ermera 8,907
  - Gleno
  - Hatolina
- Lautém District
  - Com
  - Fuiloro
  - Iliomar
  - Laivai
  - Lautém
  - Lore
  - Lospalos
  - Luro
  - Mehara
  - Tutuala
- Liquiçá District
  - Bazartete
  - Liquiçá 5,005
  - Maubara
- Manatuto District
  - Laclubar
  - Laleia
  - Manatuto 3,692
  - Natarbora
- Manufahi District
  - Alas
  - Fatuberlio
  - Same
  - Turiscai
- Oecusse District
  - Citrana
  - Nitibe
  - Oe Silo
  - Pante Macassar 12,352
  - Passabe
- Viqueque District
  - Beacu
  - Lacluta
  - Ossu
  - Uatolari
  - Viqueque 6,859
- Atauro Island
  - Berau
  - Biquele
  - Vila Maumeta
