= South Laclo River =

River in Timor-Leste

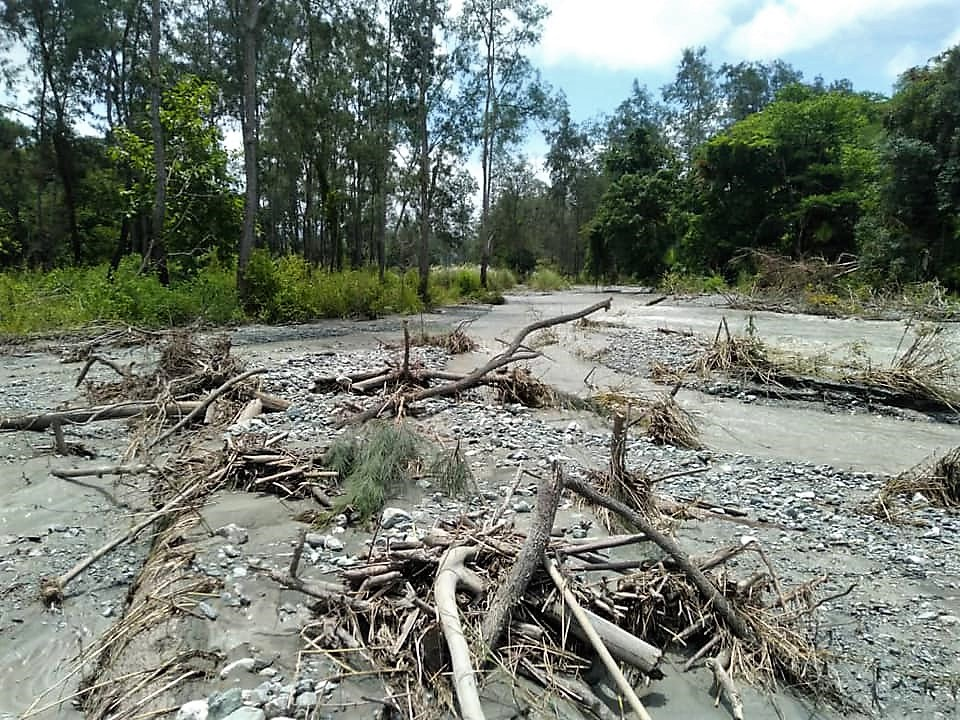
- The river in Suco Dotik

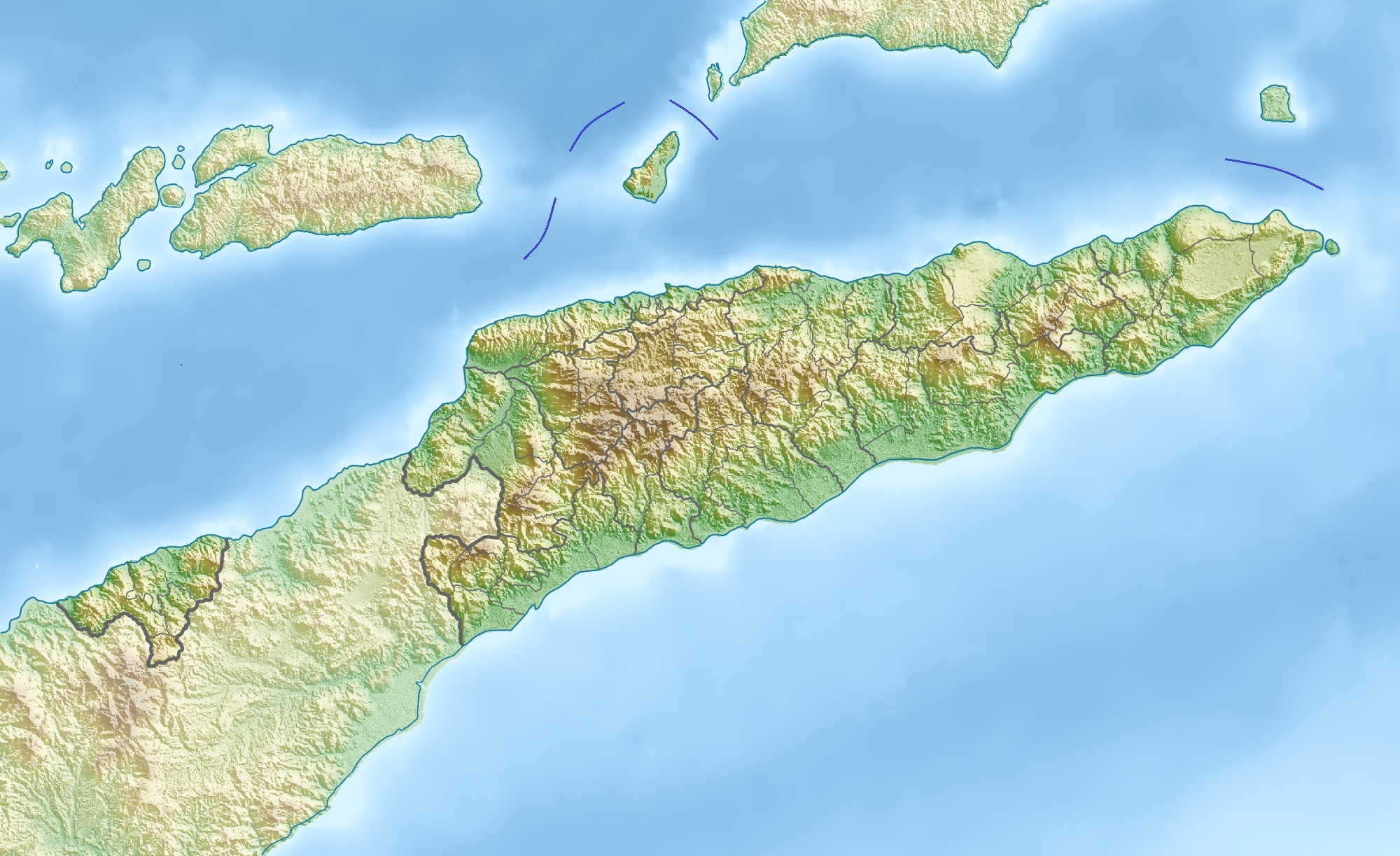
- Location of river mouth
- Native name: Ribeira de Lacló do Sul /; Rio Lacló do Sul (Portuguese); Mota Lakló (Tetum)

Location
- Country: Timor-Leste
- Municipality: Manufahi

Physical characteristics
- Source confluence: Ahangcain River
- Mouth: Timor Sea
  - location: Uma Berloic / Dotik
  - coordinates: 9°07′44″S 125°56′55″E
- Basin size: ~ 216 km^{2} (83 sq mi)

Basin features
- Tributaries
  - left: Limetain River, Clerec River (branch)
  - right: Marak River

The South Laclo River (Portuguese: Ribeira de Lacló do Sul or Rio Lacló do Sul, Tetum: Mota Lakló) is a river in the Manufahi municipality of Timor-Leste. It flows southwards, and then southeastwards, into the Timor Sea.

== Etymology ==
English language sources conventionally refer to the river as the South Laclo River, as there is also another Laclo River, usually referred to in English as the North Laclo River, which discharges into Wetar Strait on the north coast of Timor-Leste.

The North Laclo River takes its name from the town of Laclo, which is located on its left bank, about 13 km (8.1 mi) from its mouth.

The two rivers are not connected to each other; both rise in the uplands near Turiscai in Manufahi municipality, where a drainage divide causes them to flow southwards and northwards, respectively, in each case later augmented by several tributaries.

== Course ==
The headwaters of the river are in the suco of Matorec, southeast of Turiscai, Manufahi. The river's tributaries, and then the river itself, flow through Manufahi in a southerly and then southeasterly direction.

The river drains most of Alas administrative post. One of the four perennial streams in Manufahi, it is also one of only eight such watercourses in southern Timor-Leste that can potentially be inhabited by saltwater crocodiles all year round (the others being the Bebui, Belulik, Caraulun, Clerec, Dilor, Irabere, and Tafara rivers).

Ultimately, the river discharges into the Timor Sea, at the southern tip of the border between Sucos Uma Berloic and Dotik, Manufahi.

In order of entrance, the river's main tributaries are as follows:

- Limetain River: rises in Suco Matorec northeast of Oroluli; flows generally south southeastwards to just east of Lagoa Laheborak, where it merges with a stream discharging from that lake to form the Ahangcain River (see below).
- Ahangcain River: flows from the confluence of the Limetain River and the stream discharging from Lagoa Laheborak southeastwards to the border between Turiscai and Fatuberlio administrative posts, near which it becomes the South Laclo River.
- Marak River: rises at the border between Fatuberlio and Alas administrative posts; flows southeastwards, initially forming the border between Sucos Aituha and Taitudac to enter the South Laclo River near the border between Aituha and Dotik.
- Clere or Clerec River: a branch of this river enters the South Laclo River a short distance north of the latter's mouth; the rest of it flows into swampy marshland that includes several lagoons.

== Catchment ==
The river's catchment or drainage basin is located within Manufahi municipality, and is approximately 216 km^{2} (83 sq mi) in area. Its main population centre is the town of Alas in central Manufahi.

Timor-Leste has been broadly divided into twelve 'hydrologic units', groupings of climatologically and physiographically similar and adjacent river catchments. The South Laclo River catchment is one of the four major ones in the Clere & Belulic hydrologic unit, which is about 1,923.6 km^{2} (742.7 sq mi) in total area and covers 12.9% of the country; the others are the catchments of the Belulic, Clerec, and Caraulun rivers.

== Economy ==
The catchment is the main source of water for the sucos of Taitudac and Mahaquidan in its middle reaches, and Uma Berloic in its lowlands. As of 2019, the catchment also had plenty of unused water and land suitable for expansion of its irrigation systems.

In and prior to the 1940s, there was gold exploration on the banks of the river. An academic paper published in 2014 asserted that there were prospects of finding gold placer in the sandy gravel strata in the South Laclo and two other rivers in the Turiscai administrative post, and, more importantly, of finding primary gold deposits in those rivers' upper reaches.

== See also ==
- List of rivers of Timor-Leste
