= East Timorese rebellion of 1911–1912 =

Series of rebellions in East Timor

East Timorese rebellion of 1911-1912
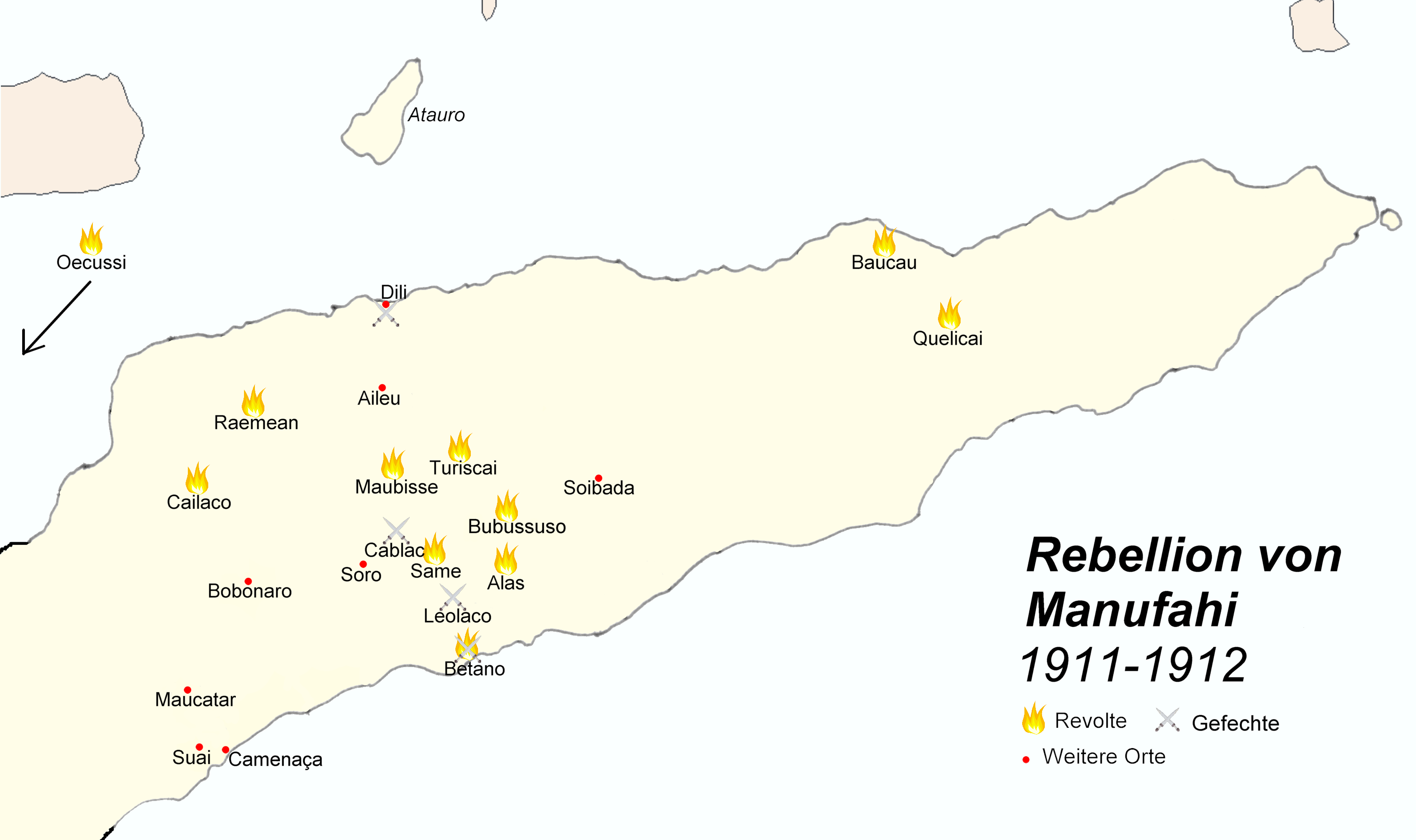
- Map of the revolt of 1911–1912: flames indicate centres of rebellion, crossed swords indicate battles, red dots villages
Date	1911–1912
Location	Portuguese Timor
Result	Portuguese victory

Belligerents
Kingdom of Manufahi	Portugal

Commanders and leaders
Boaventura da Costa	(First Portuguese Republic) Filomeno da Câmara de Melo Cabral (First Portuguese Republic) Jaime do Inso (First Portuguese Republic) Gago Coutinho (First Portuguese Republic) Álvares da Silva †

Strength
12,000+ rebels	8,000 Irregulars; 647 Second-line troops 500 First-line troops 1 gunboat

Casualties and losses
3,424 dead 12,567 wounded Huge loss of war material	289 dead 600 wounded

The East Timorese rebellion of 1911–1912, sometimes called the Great Rebellion or Rebellion of Manufahi, (Note: In Portuguese it is often called the Guerra de Manufahi or (Grande) Revolta de Manufahi. In English it may be called the "Boaventura rebellion", "Manufahi War", etc.) was a response to the efforts of Portuguese colonial authorities to collect a head tax and enforce the corvée, part of their larger effort to encourage cash crop agriculture and construct modern infrastructure. The countrywide conflict of 1911–12 was the culmination of a series of revolts led by Dom Boaventura, the liurai (chief) (Note: The Tetum term liurai was translated rei (king) or régulo (kinglet) by the Portuguese and by the Dutch raj (a borrowed Hindi term).) of the native kingdom of Manufahi. The first lasted from 1894 to 1901, the second from 1907 to 1908. In 1911 Boaventura led an alliance of local kingdoms in the last and most serious revolt against the Portuguese.

In February 1912 rebels from one kingdom entered the colonial capital of Dili, killing and burning as they went. They looted Government House and decapitated several Portuguese soldiers and officers. In August, the Portuguese brought in troops from Mozambique and a gunboat from Macau to suppress the revolt.

The revolt cost 3,424 Timorese killed and 12,567 wounded, and 289 Portuguese killed and 600 wounded. After 1912 the Portuguese pacification of East Timor was complete. They also ceased to appoint hereditary liurais and the native states went extinct. The rebellion of 1912 was seminal in creating an East Timorese identity distinct from "Portuguese subject" or just "Timorese".

== Background ==
=== Reino of Manufahi ===
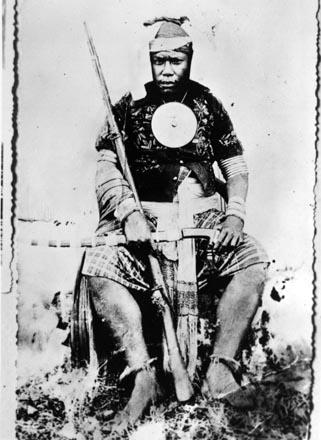
Boaventura dressed for war

The reino or native kingdom of Manufahi (also Manufai) lay on the southern coast of Timor, within the military district of Alas, based on the rationalised re-districting of 1860. It had an estimated population of 42,000 living in 6,500 houses in 1903. It owed a finta (customary tribute) to the Portuguese treasury of 96,000 Mexican dollars, although this was difficult to collect. It was governed by a king or liurai (hereditary native chief) who was confirmed in his position by the Portuguese governor. Manufahi's agriculturalists produced horses, sheep, cereals, fruit, coffee and tobacco. Its craftsmen were the finest silver and goldsmiths in Portuguese Timor, manufacturing bracelets and anklets. There were also skilled pyrographers working bamboo pipes. More ominously, Manufahi produced leather cartridge belts and musket shot, materials that could be put to use in a revolt.

The countrywide conflict of 1911–1912 was the culmination of a series of revolts led by Manufahi. The first, which took place during the reign of Dom Duarte, Boaventura's father, lasted from 1894 to 1901 and the second from 1907 to 1908.

The west and north of Manufahi was the reino of Suru, centred on the mountain of Tatamailau. It had only been subdued by the Portuguese and subjugated to the reino of Atsabe in 1900. In 1907, the liurai of Suru, Naicau, petitioned the Portuguese for independence from Atsabe and it was granted. Naicau would prove loyal to the Portuguese and a thorn in Manufahi's side.

=== Head tax system ===
In 1906, at the suggestion of Governor José Celestino da Silva, the Portuguese government decided to replace the finta with a capitation (a head tax). A decree of 13 September outlined new regulations. All heads of native households owed 500 réis annually unless they were under contract (contratados) on agricultural plantations of more than 500 hectares or living in reinos producing at least 500,000 pounds of the valuable cash crops of coffee, cocoa or cotton. In those reinos where the capitation was collected, the liurai received half of all the revenues. The decree stipulated, furthermore, that all reinos with less than 600 heads of household were to be abolished, but this seems never to have been carried out. Liurais were forbidden to collect any tax or tribute but the capitation. With these measures, the Portuguese government sought to transform the reino into a fiscal unit and the liurai into a fiscal agent, while pushing independent cultivators into the more lucrative production of coffee (so as to be able to pay the capitation).

The head tax system was initially opposed by Manufahi and a few allies. In 1910, a commission was sent to take a census of the native population. It ascertained there were 98,920 heads of family eligible to pay tax in 73 or 75 loyal reinos. In disloyal reinos, such as Manufahi, which had seen fighting in 1907–08, the population had shrunk.

=== Republican revolution ===
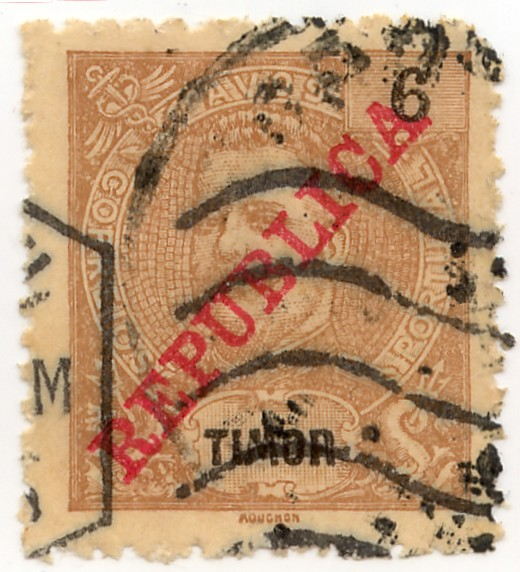
A Timorese stamp bearing the image of Carlos I overprinted with REPUBLICA after the revolution.

On 5 October 1910, a revolution in Portugal overthrew the monarchy and established the First Republic. The revolution in the metropole had repercussions in the colonies. In both East Timor and Macau, the governors resigned and the Jesuits were expelled. According to some reports, a rumour of the revolution first reached Dili through an Australian visitor, but it was confirmed officially by telegram on 7 October. On 8 October, the protected cruiser São Gabriel arrived from Darwin with further confirmation. On 30 October, the outgoing governor, Alfredo Cardoso de Soveral Martins, formally proclaimed the republic before an assembly that included his fellow officials, military officers, churchmen and the leading men of commerce. The royal flag was taken down and the new republic flag run up. On 5 November, in a series of public announcements, Governor Martins confirmed that the new republic was to be a democratic one, and that royal symbols would progressively be removed from military uniforms, government letterheads, etc. The old patacas would continue to circulate as legal tender.

The republican revolution was met with confusion by many native Timorese, who treated the royal flag as a lulic (Note: Tetum for "sacred".) symbol and part of their regal paraphernalia. This attitude had long been encouraged by Portuguese officials, who now had to explain why the old ensign was being replaced. The Dutch of West Timor took advantage of the situation by distributing pictures of Queen Wilhelmina amongst the men of the disputed region of Lakmaras, in the hopes of giving a pro-Dutch turn to their royalist and anti-republican sentiment.

Martins left Dili in early November, after the death of his wife. He was replaced on an interim basis by his secretary, Captain Anselmo Augusto Coelho de Carvalho, who in turn was replaced on 22 December by Captain José Carrazedo de Sousa Caldas Vianna e Andrade. The next day (23 December), on orders from Lisbon, the Jesuits of Soibada were expelled, along with some Canossian nuns. While the mission house at Soibada was taken over by non-Jesuit missionaries, the effect of the removal of the lulic Jesuits was similar to that of removing the royal ensign. At the same time, Masonic lodges were set up in Dili, which even some educated Timorese joined. The Chinese community in Dili, composed of immigrants from Macau, was broadly pro-republican. Marches were held in the street to celebrate the Chinese republican revolution that took place in 1911.

=== Portuguese forces ===
At the start of the revolt, the Portuguese forces included 56 European infantrymen and an artillery section with two officers (sergeants) and 114 troops (eighteen Europeans and ninety-six Africans). In addition to these, the colonial government could count on second-line native troops (moradores) and the levies (arraias) of the loyal native chieftains. Some of these were stationed in Dili. Depending on their rank, the soldiers carried either Remington Rolling Block rifles or outdated flintlock muskets. The moradores were frequently armed with nothing more than a catana or cutlass.

== Revolt ==
=== Outbreak and first reprisals (October–December 1911) ===
On 5 October 1911, the first anniversary of the republican revolution, several liurais opposed to an announced increase in the head tax camped with their retinues in the suburbs of Dili. According to Second Lieutenant Jaime do Inso, the chiefs conspired to massacre the Europeans of Dili only to abandon their plan after learning of the presence of an English merchant ship in the port.

At the end of October, the commander of the posto (garrison) of Suai announced that the head tax would be increased. When word reached the posto that a number of liurai, including Boaventura, were planning to gather there to request an exemption, the Portuguese garrison, with a number of British oil prospectors in tow, evacuated Suai on 8 December. The first victim of the revolt was a Mozambican soldier, who was killed while trying to bring a message from the commander of Suai to Bobonaro. The first European victim was Lieutenant Alvares da Silva, commander of the Same posto in Manufahi. On 24 December, he was shot on Boaventura's orders along with four or five other Europeans. His severed head was then presented to his wife. This incident is usually regarded as the beginning of the revolt against the colonial authorities. Although the rebels cut several telephone lines, that between Aileu posto and Dili remained open.

The local Portuguese commander in Manufahi immediately went on the offensive, dispersing the rebels and securing positions for future offensive operations. As the revolt spread, plantations were abandoned, and several European families fled Dili. Portuguese reprisals had, by 29 December, forced 1,200 Timorese, including the liurai of Camenassa and his retinue, to seek refuge in the Dutch enclave of Maucatar.

In Dili, Governor Filomeno da Câmara de Melo Cabral hastily arranged a defence and sent a request for reinforcements to Lisbon. The government ordered the gunboat Pátria to proceed from Macau to Dili, and ordered the colony of Mozambique to raise a company of soldiers for service in Timor. The Portuguese steamship Zaire was chartered to take the Mozambican troops to Timor, and the Ministry of the Colonies requested a subvention from the Ministry of Finance for putting down the rebellion.

According to the account of Jaime do Inso, who only arrived later on the Pátria, three human heads were found hanging near the posto of Laclo just ten minutes outside Dili. This practice, which do Inso characterised as "the repugnant cruelty of a war by primitive people", was known as funu in Timorese. It involved taking enemy heads back to the land of one's ancestors and displaying it as a lulic to the accompaniment of traditional dancing (tabedai) and chant (lorsai).

=== Da Câmara's first campaign in the interior ===
On 5 January 1912, at the height of the wet season, Governor da Câmara marched out of Dili with a force of 200 men (25 Europeans plus moradores) towards the posto at Aileu, picking up loyal arraias on the way. His main objective was to convince the natives with a show of force in the affected territory that they could not win. His secondary objective to pull rebel forces away from the capital. His strategy was a gamble. Previous revolts had always been localised, and their suppression had always depended on cooperation from loyal reinos. If opposition to the island-wide policy of the head tax engendered a general revolt, then da Câmara's decision to take his main force out into the most affected territory could be suicidal. The reinos of Alas, Bibisusso, Cailaco, Raimean and Turiscai, all neighbouring Manufahi, had joined the rebellion.

The governor campaigned successfully in the interior for three weeks, at the end of which his small force was overextended and he had to halt. Reinforcements were brought in to bring the number of government troops up to eight officers, 65 first-line soldiers, 264 second-line soldiers (moradores) and 2,070 irregulars. Even this augmented force was still outnumbered by rebels. The reino of Suru, which controlled vital communication routes between the north and south coasts, remained loyal to the Portuguese. When Boaventura attacked the post of Ainaro, the liurai Naicau went to its defence and alerted the Portuguese.

The gunboat Pátria was instrumental in eliminating the rebellion in coastal areas

=== Campaign of the Pátria ===
In February, reinforcement started arriving. The gunboat Pátria, which had steamed from Macau to Singapore, then to Soerabaja in the Dutch East Indies, where it was kept in port by the monsoons, finally arrived at Dili on 6 February. The Companhia Europeia da India, a company of 75 soldiers, about half of them Europeans, took passage on the British steamship Saint Albans from Portuguese India to Macau to Dili, where they arrived on 11 February. Finally, the British steamship Aldenham disembarked the African soldiers of the 8th Companhia Indígena de Moçambique in Dili on 15 February. Likewise, the Eastern and Australian Line sent 180 tons of coal for the Pátria. W. Pearse, a passenger on the Eastern and Australian ship, reported that some 400 prisoners-of-war coaled the Pátria under guard.

The Pátria, commanded by First Lieutenant Carlos Viegas Gago Coutinho, conducted bombardments of native strongholds between February and April 1912. A young officer aboard the ship, Jaime do Inso, has left a first-hand description of the effects of this bombardment on Boaventura's forces on the south coast. He reports that the sound of the artillery created confusion and caused as much a psychological damage as physical. The Pátria bombarded Oecusse, Baucau and Quilicai. The village of Betano was struck while the native queen (rainha) was convening an assembly of local chiefs, resulting in about 1,000 deaths. The Pátria also landed infantry troops that allowed the Portuguese to encircle Boaventura's forces and capture many prisoners. The Pátria was eventually reassigned to Macau, to protect Portuguese interests amidst the 1911 Revolution.

=== Final campaign and siege ===
The governor's campaign continued into May, when a second round of reinforcements arrived. The rebellion was extended to the Oecussi enclave, but without any coordination with the rebellion elsewhere. During the second phase of his offensive, da Câmara divided his reinforced army into four columns. His own column set out from Maubisse and comprised twenty Europeans, two hundred Africans and five hundred moradores. Including the arraias of allied chieftains, it contained over 4,000 troops. It also had a modern Krupp 75 mm field gun. The second column, comprising an Indian company with a Nordenfelt mitrailleuse and several hundred moradores, marched from Soibada; the third, with two Europeans, seventy Africans and two hundred moradores armed with another Nordenfelt, from Suru; and the fourth, a flying column with one hundred moradores, from the Dutch border. By the time of the final assault, da Câmara's force, the largest foreign army ever assembled at the time in Timor, contained 8,000 irregulars, 647 second-line troops, 500 first-line troops and 34 officers. What tipped the scales, beyond the increased manpower, was the availability to the Portuguese of modern weaponry—artillery, machine guns, grenades—and the deployment of the gunboat Patria to shell coastal areas. Portuguese forces gradually squeezed the Timorese into smaller and smaller enclaves.

Something of the weakness of the native opposition can be gleaned from the record of what weaponry the Portuguese captured: 36 rifles and 590 flintlocks with a few cartridges, plus 495 swords. In general, the native Timorese possessed more spears than guns and were usually short of powder. They avoided close combat, where they were the discrepancy in guns was acutely felt, in favour of hit-and-run guerrilla tactics. Governor Filomeno da Câmara expressed great admiration for the courage and martial acumen of the Timorese, and their effectiveness on the battlefield, despite the very limited arsenal at their disposal.

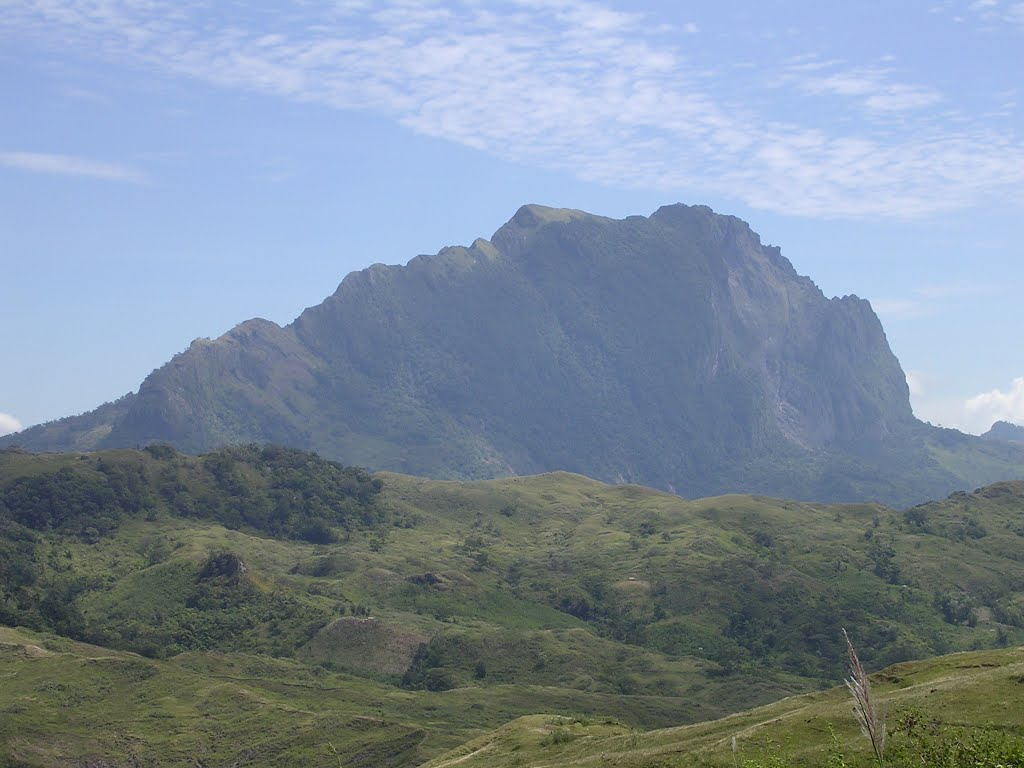
Mount Leolaco

Although Boaventura sued for peace in early May, the Portuguese rebuffed the offer. The main rebel group of about 12,000 men, women and children under Boaventura retreated into the Cablac mountains and prepared to make a final stand around the Riac and Leolaco peaks. Isolated and surrounded in a 35 km^{2} area, they constructed an earthwork (tranqueira) reinforced by wood and stone. Many also went into hiding in caves. On 11 June the Portuguese siege began. When the Manufahistas attempted a breakthrough, over 3,000 died in the fighting. Boaventura himself escaped, but in late July he surrendered. The siege ended on 21 July. The Times of London in August called the siege of Cablac a "major battle" in which over 3,000 Timorese were killed or wounded and another 4,000 captured. According to Pearse, a passenger on the Eastern and Australian ship, who left an account of his observations and discussions in Dili, he was told that the rebel leaders were to be exiled to Africa and other prisoners to Atauro Island.

== Legacy ==
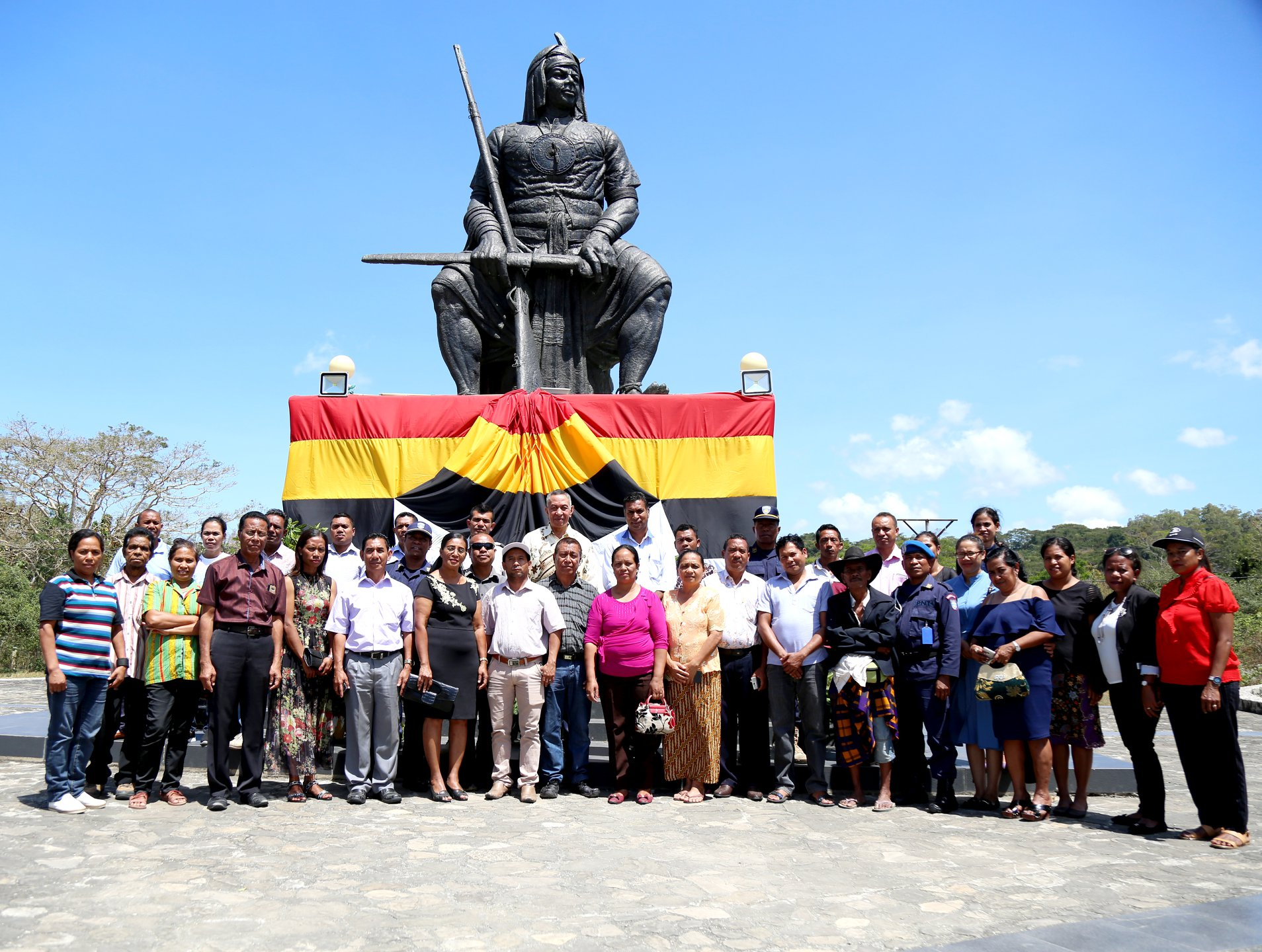
Statue of Boaventura in Manufahi.

Queen Maria of Manufahi, the widow of Boaventura, had been a member of FRETILIN since 1974 and supported East Timor's independence.

Boaventura became a central symbol of the nation's heroic history. During the 1999 East Timorese crisis, local residents hoped that Boaventura's spirit would protect them from the marauding Pro-Indonesia militia. Today, the fighting at Cablac is glorified in East Timor, particularly in Manufahi, as Boaventura's heroic battle, while the Liurai himself is revered as a national hero of East Timor and serves as an object of veneration in popular culture and among youth gangs. Among other things, the Order of Dom Boaventura, one of the country's highest decorations, was named in his honor.

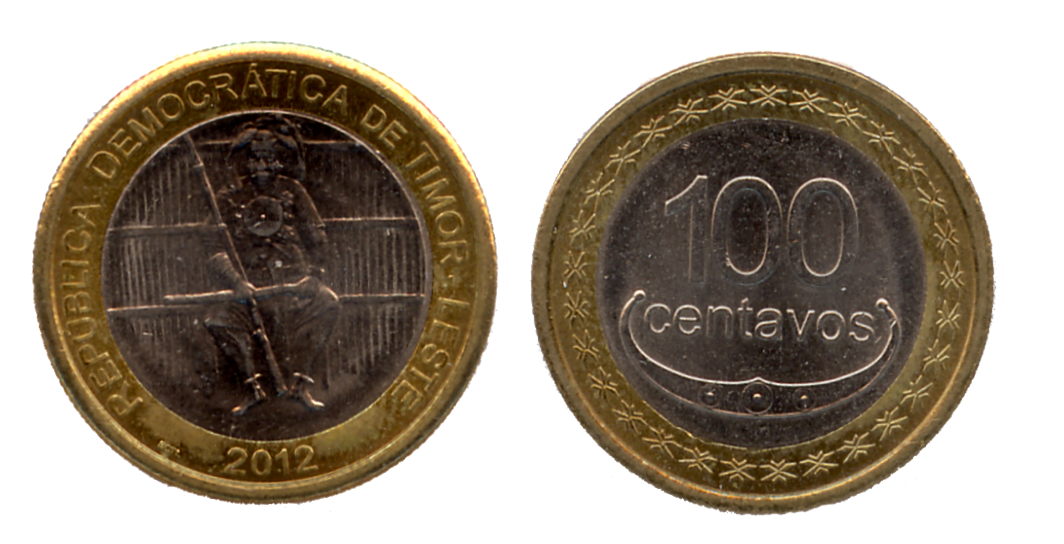
East Timorese commemorative coin from 2012 featuring Boaventura

== Sources ==
- Augusto de Figueiredo, Fernando (2004). Timor: A presença portuguesa (1769–1945) (PhD dissertation). University of Porto.
- Bernardino, Teresa (1984). "Timor e a soberania portuguesa do descobrimento à revolta de 1912" (PDF). Revista Nação e Defesa. 9 (31).
- Durand, Frédéric (2011). "Three Centuries of Violence and Struggle in East Timor (1726–2008)" (PDF). In Jacques Semelin (ed.). Online Encyclopedia of Mass Violence. Vol. 6. SciencesPo.
- Gunn, Geoffrey C. (1998). "Reviews". Journal of Contemporary Asia. 28 (1): 122–30. doi:10.1080/00472339880000071.
- Gunn, Geoffrey C. (1999). Timor Loro Sae: 500 Years. Macau: Livros do Oriente.
- Gunn, Geoffrey C. (2011). Historical Dictionary of East Timor. Plymouth: Scarecrow Press.
- Jannisa, Gudmund (1997). The Crocodile's Tears: East Timor in the Making. University of Lund.
- Kammen, Douglas (2012). "Proclaiming East Timor: Historical Reflections on Political Declarations" (PDF). Ellipsis. 10: 21–34. Archived from the original on 2015-07-01.
- Pélissier, René (1996). Timor en guerre: Le crocodile et les Portugais (1847–1913). Orgeval: Editions Pélissier. Also published in Portuguese as Timor em Guerra: A Conquista Portuguesa (1847–1913), Lisbon: Editorial Estampa, 2007.
- Pinto, Constâncio; Jardine, Matthew (1997). East Timor's Unfinished Struggle: Inside the East Timor Resistance. Boston: South End Press.
- Steenbrink, Karel (2007). Catholics in Indonesia: A Documented History, Volume 2 (1903–1942). Koninklijk Instituut voor Taal-, Land- en Volkenkunde.
