= Alas, Timor-Leste =

Town in Alas Subdistrict, Timor-Leste

Coordinates: 9.02581°S 125.78625°E

Alas is a town in Alas Administrative Post, Timor-Leste. It is located in the interior of the island, 294 metres above sea level. As the crow flies, Alas is 56 km southeast of the state capital Dili and 7 km to the east of Same.

== History ==
=== Pre-colonial and Portuguese Timor ===
Alas was one of the traditional kingdoms of Timor, ruled by a Liurai. Alas appears in a list of 47 territories governed by a former Governor of Portuguese Timor, Afonso de Castro in 1868.

In 1700, the Liurai of Alas was converted to Christianity by a Dominican friar Manuel de Santo António.

In 1761 to 1762, Dom José, the Liurai of Alas was a member of the governing council which took over the running of Portuguese Timor following the expulsion and death of Governor Sebastião de Azevedo e Brito. During the Cová rebellion (1868–1871), Alas sent troops to support the Portuguese colonial authorities. However, during the Manufahi rebellion (1911–1912), Alas sided with the rebels.

=== 1975 civil war ===
During the 1975 civil war, supporters of the UDT and the FRETILIN movement, who had previously been in coalition, were involved in numerous altercations. On 27 August 1975, prompted by news that FRETILIN supporters were approaching the area, eleven prisoners belonging to either FRETILIN or its youth wing UNETIM were brought from Same to the beach at Meti Oan in suco of Mahaquidan and killed. Among the victims was the president of UNETIM, Domingos Lobato, brother of Nicolau and Rogerio Lobato.

=== Indonesian invasion and occupation ===
Following the Indonesian invasion in December 1975, Alas was one of the areas to which the FALINTIL resistance movement retreated, and the location of the South-Central Resistance Base (Base de Apoio Centro Sul). This base initially sheltered refugees from Manatuto, Same, Dili, Liquiçá, Ermera, Aileu, and Ainaro, and in 1978 also received refugees from Turiscai.

In August 1978, the base was attacked by Indonesian forces. During the three-month siege which followed, many civilians were killed or died of hunger and thousands of East Timorese surrendered or were taken prisoner. Prisoners from Alas, as well as those from other regions such as Same, Fatuberlio, Turiscai, Maubisse, Aileu, Soibada, and Natarbora, were interned in military camps in Selihassan or Same, or taken to temporary camps near Alas town: Uma Metan ("Black House"), 400 metres south of Alas town; or Lebos, 2 km to the Southwest. A further "settlement camp" was located in Besusu (suco of Uma Berloic).

At one point, 8,000 people were interned in Uma Metan. Prisoners were given only a small can of maize each week, and were forbidden to leave the camp to seek more food or tend gardens. The nearest water source was 500 metres away. Witnesses allege that five or six people died daily from starvation. Illnesses such as tuberculosis, beri-beri and diarrhoea were rife, and there was no medical care. Executions of those involved in the resistance were also common. On the orders of their captors, the prisoners built a village hall and a school, where they were to be taught the Indonesian language. In reality however, the "pupils" of this school were young female prisoners, and the school quickly became the site of mass rape by army personnel. Residents of the area allege that around 2,000 people were buried in mass graves near Uma Metan.

The Uma Metan and Lebos camps were important military bases for the Indonesian forces fighting resistance supporters in the mountains of Manufahi. Among others, units from the 700 Land-Air Battalion, the 745 and 310 Battalions and Kopassandha special forces unit were stationed here. Alas was also the headquarters for the Koramil sub-district territorial command and the Hansip civil defence force.

In 1979, areas previously not occupied by the Indonesian forces came under attack. Residents of these areas fled to Sarin or Turiscai, which were already under Indonesian control.

In 1981, the inhabitants of Bubussuso and Fahinehan were forcibly resettled in Dotik after they were suspected of supplying FALINTIL resistance fighters with food.

Between 1970 and 1980, the number of inhabitants in the Alas sank by 29%, falling from 5,034 to 3,574.

=== Violence following East Timor Special Autonomy Referendum ===
A referendum held on 20 August 1998 was met with overwhelming support (78.5% in favour) for independence, and followed by an explosion of violence between pro-independence militias and Indonesian armed forces.

On 9 November 1998, fighters from the FALINTIL movement killed three Indonesian soldiers and captured a further 13, 11 of whom were later released. Nine FALINTIL militants were also killed in the attack. The following day, the Indonesian armed forces began retaliatory operations throughout the sub district of Alas. On 13 November, Indonesian soldiers entered the suco of Taitudac and took the village chief, Vicente Xavier, and four others prisoner. They were taken to Barique and executed. At the time, the Commander of the Indonesian army in East Timor alleged that Xavier had been the brains behind the FALINTIL attack on 9 November. On 15 November, Indonesian troops entered the village of Turin, and again attacked Taitudac. Two of Xavier's nieces, both teenagers, were arrested and taken to the district military headquarters in Same where they were kept in solitary confinement. On 16 November, a further 11 people were arrested in Kopassus, in the ‘'sucos'’ of Taittudac and Betano. Houses in Aituha were also razed. Many of the people in the affected villages sought sanctuary in church buildings. Those who stayed behind were faced with food and water shortages, as the Indonesian troops had destroyed the water pipelines. In total, around 50 people were executed and a further 30 imprisoned during the operations. This information could be disputed from independent investigation.
