= Same Administrative Post =

Administrative post in Manufahi Municipality, Timor-Leste

Same
- Administrative Post
- Posto Administrativo de Same (Portuguese); Postu administrativu Same (Tetum)
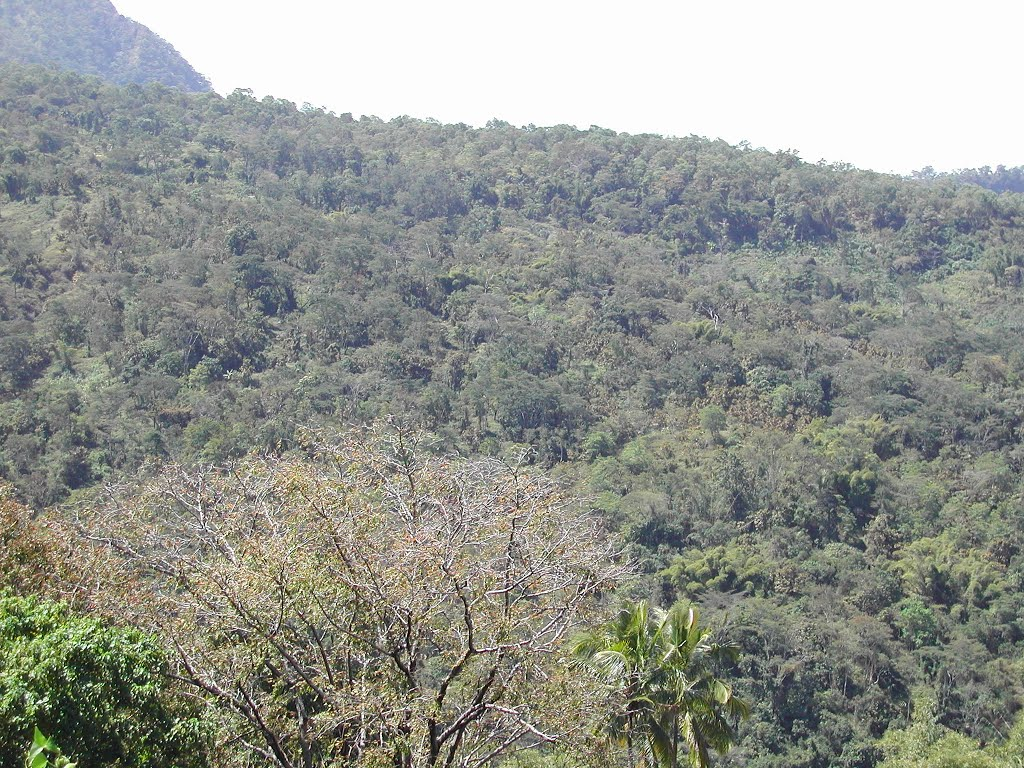
- Secondary tropical forest south of Same

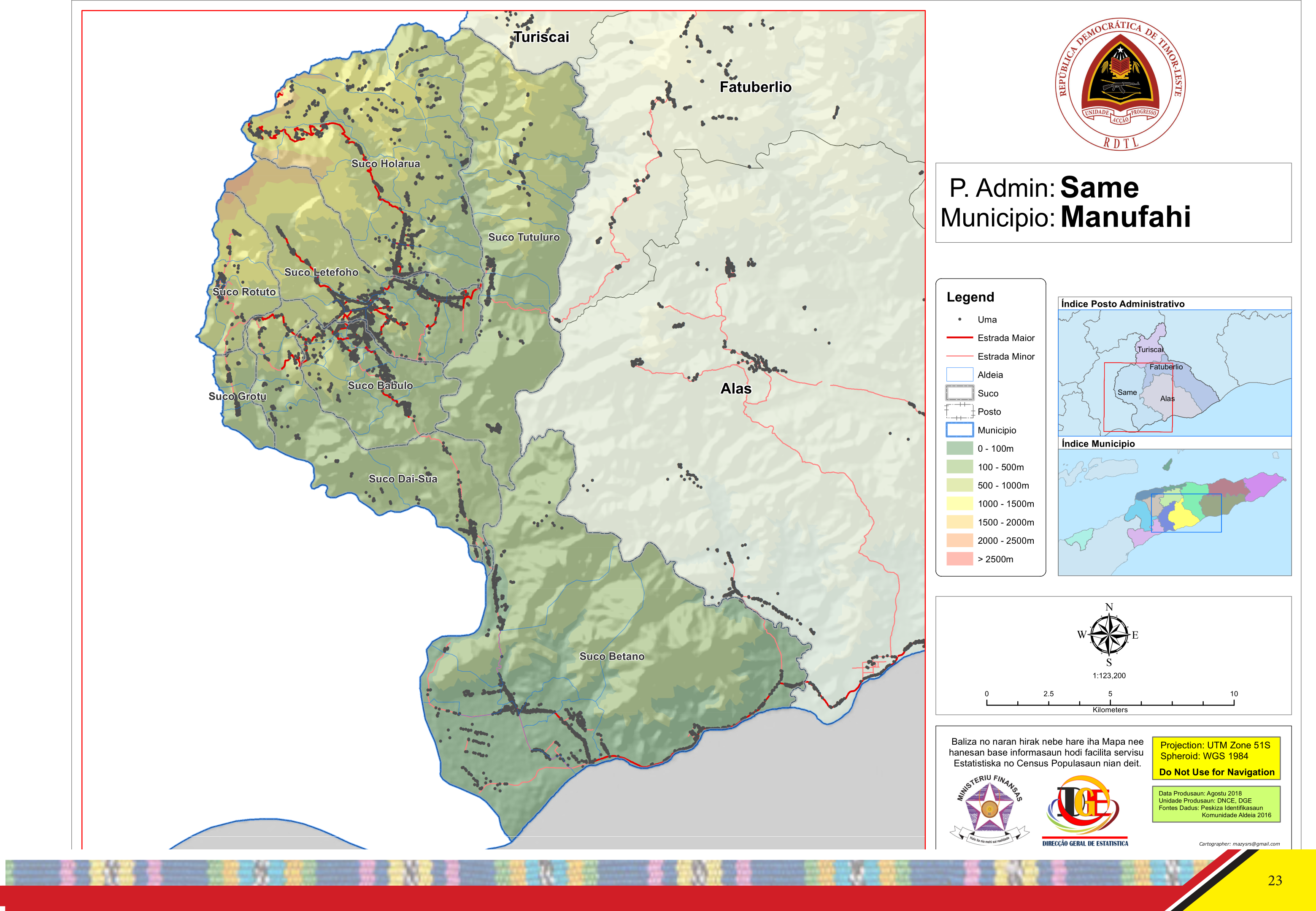
- Official map

- Location within East Timor
- Coordinates: 9°0′S 125°39′E
- Country: Timor-Leste
- Municipality: Manufahi
- Seat: Holarua
- Sucos: Babulo; Betano; Dai-Sua; Grotu; Holarua; Letefoho; Rotuto; Tutuluro

Area
  - Total: 353.1 km^{2} (136.3 sq mi)

Population (2015 census)
  - Total: 30,673
  - Density: 86.87/km^{2} (225.0/sq mi)

Households (2015 census)
  - Total: 5,245
- Time zone: UTC+09:00 (TLT)

Same (Portuguese pronunciation: [ˈsamɛ]), officially Same Administrative Post (Portuguese: Posto Administrativo de Same, Tetum: Postu administrativu Same), is an administrative post (and was formerly a subdistrict) in the Manufahi municipality of Timor-Leste. Its seat or administrative centre is Holarua.
