= Alas Administrative Post =

Administrative post in Manufahi Municipality, Timor-Leste

Alas
- Administrative Post
- Posto Administrativo de Alas (Portuguese); Postu administrativu Alas (Tetum)
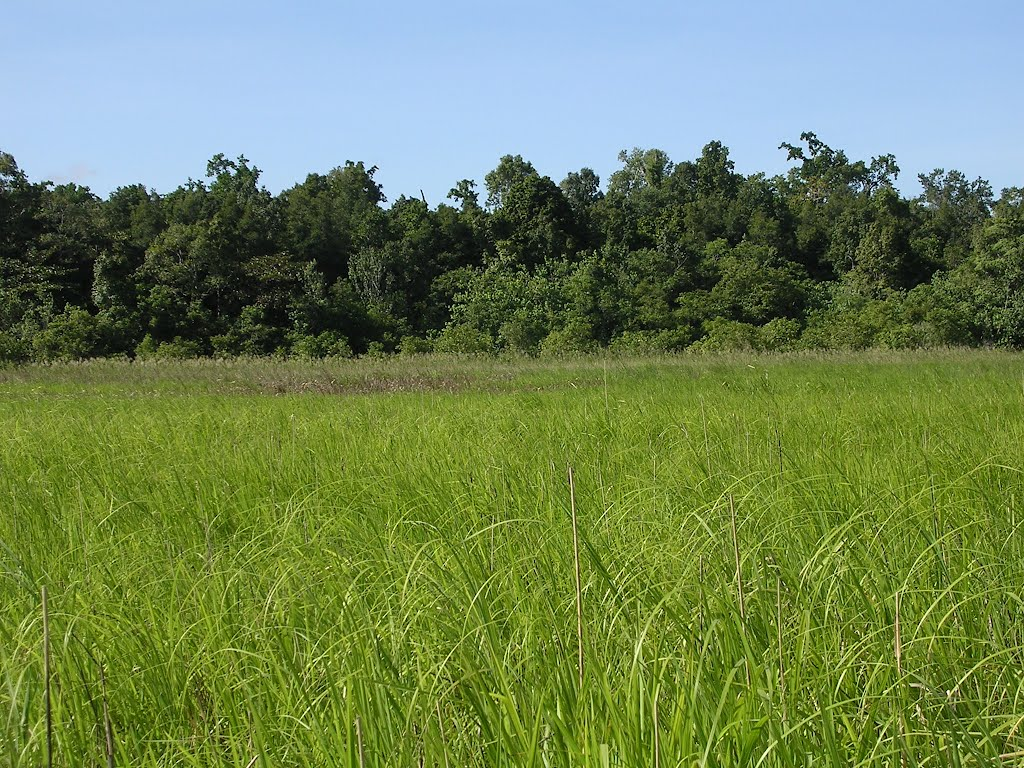
- Swampland and tall grassland, Clere River area, Welaluhu, Manufahi

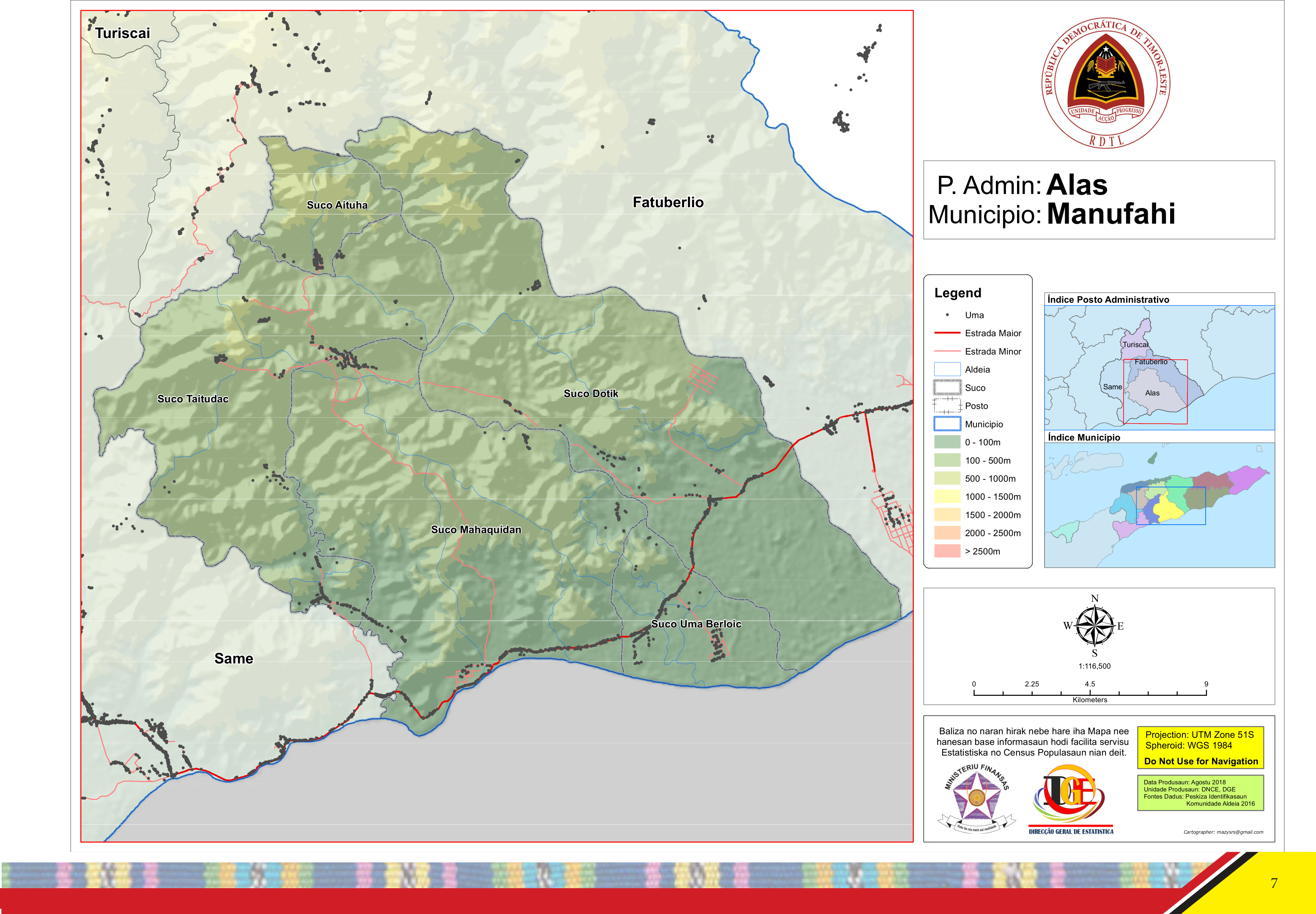
- Official map

- Location within East Timor
- Coordinates: 9°1′S 125°48′E
- Country: Timor-Leste
- Municipality: Manufahi
- Seat: Mahaquidan
- Sucos: Aituha; Dotik; Mahaquidan; Taitudac; Uma Berloic

Area
  - Total: 406.4 km^{2} (156.9 sq mi)

Population (2015 census)
  - Total: 7,884
  - Density: 19.40/km^{2} (50.24/sq mi)

Households (2015 census)
  - Total: 1,405
- Time zone: UTC+09:00 (TLT)

Alas, officially Alas Administrative Post (Portuguese: Posto Administrativo de Alas, Tetum: Postu administrativu Alas), is an administrative post (and was formerly a subdistrict) in the centre of Manufahi municipality, which lies in the centre of Timor-Leste. Its seat or administrative centre is Mahaquidan, and it is divided into five sucos: Aituha, Dotik (Dotic), Mahaquidan, Taitudac, and Uma Berloic (Uma Berloik).

The South Laclo, the largest river in Manufahi, flows across the Alas plain and into the Timor Sea. In the centre of Alas, to the East of Alas town, the river is joined by a tributary and forms a large lake with many islands. The Clerec river forms a border to the East, where the administrative post of Alas meets the administrative post of Fatuberlio. Fatuberlio then continues on, past Alas, to the North. Shortly before the river mouth, the Clerec forms a lagoon known as the Lagoa Mapliu. A number of further lagoons are to be found on both sides of the Lacló and Clerec estuaries. The most southerly point of Alas, Ponta Metibot is located some distance East of the Quelan estuary, to the West of Same administrative post.

== Demographics ==
The population of Alas Administrative Post as of the 2010 census was 7,179, rising from 6,485 in 2004. The average age among inhabitants was 17.4 years

The most commonly spoken language is Tetum Terik, a dialect of Tetum.

49% of households in Alas grow cassava, 51% grow corn, 48% grow assorted vegetables, 43% grow rice and 27% grow coffee. 53% of households own coconut palm trees.
