= Portuguese gunboat Pátria =

Gunboat of the Portuguese Navy

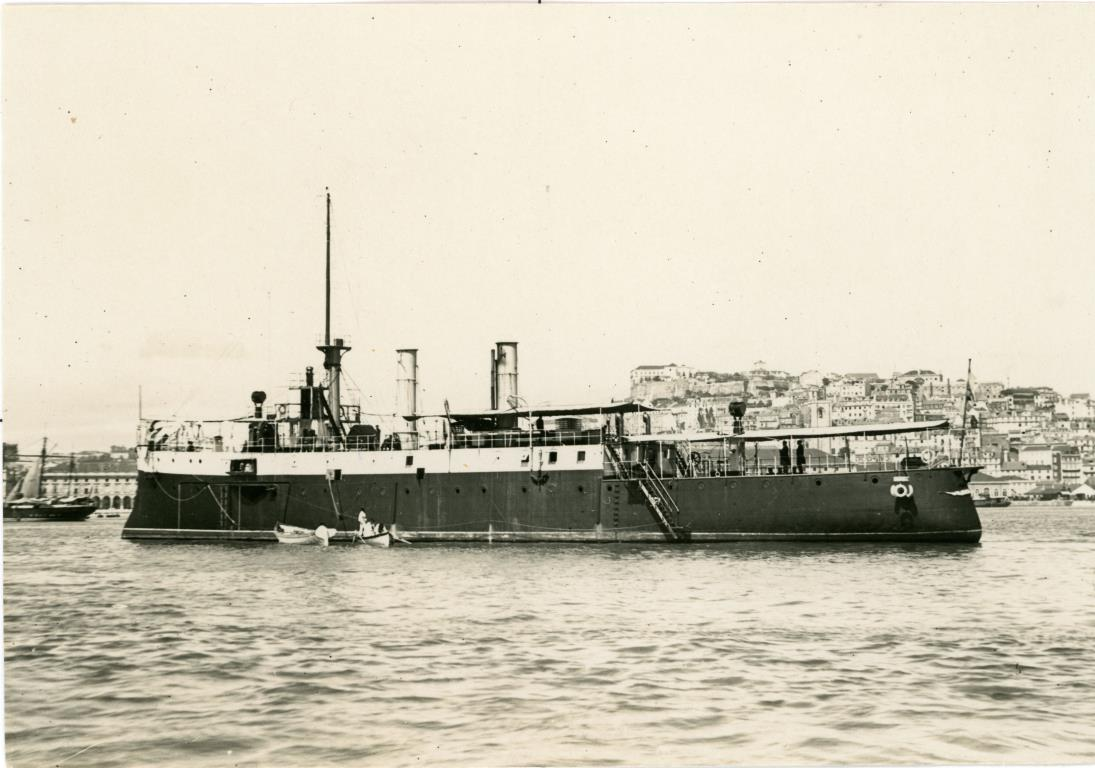
- Pátria at the Tagus.

History

Portugal
- Name: Pátria
- Builder: Lisbon
- Launched: 27 June 1903

General characteristics
- Type: Gunboat
- Displacement: 626 tons
- Length: 60 m
- Beam: 8.3 m
- Installed power: 1,800 h.p
- Speed: 16.7 knots (max)
- Armament: 4 x 1 Canon de 100 mm Modèle 1891 6 x 1 QF 3-pounder Hotchkiss
- Armour: deck: 12

Pátria was a gunboat in the Portuguese Navy launched in 1903 at Lisbon. She was acquired with the funds of the Great National Subscription shortly after the 1890 British Ultimatum. In 1905 she left for the Naval Division of Angola and in the same year she made a trip to Brazil. In 1908 she left for the Macau Naval Station, and did a long service. She took part in the suppression of the Timor revolt in 1912. In 1930, she was ordered to disarm and passed to the state of complete disarmament the following year, in Macau. She was sold to China in 1931.

== Specifications ==
Her main specifications were:

- Naval Tonnage: 636 tons
- Length: 60 metres
- Width: 8.4 metres
- Power (Engine): 1860 H.P.
- Average speed: 12 knots
- Armament: 4x1 Canon de 100 mm Modèle 1891, 6x1 QF 3-pounder Hotchkiss

She had two triple-expansion steam engines, two pipe boilers and various auxiliary engines and a work-shop. The electric installations included two searchlights, two steam dynamos and one group generator. She carried five anchors, two mooring chains, two lifeboats, agave and canvassed ropes and six water tanks.
