= Macadai de Baixo =

Village in Timor-Leste

Coordinates: 8°29′S 126°20′E

Macadai de Baixo is a village in Timor-Leste.
