= Fatuberlio =

Coordinates: 8°56′54″S 125°52′13″E

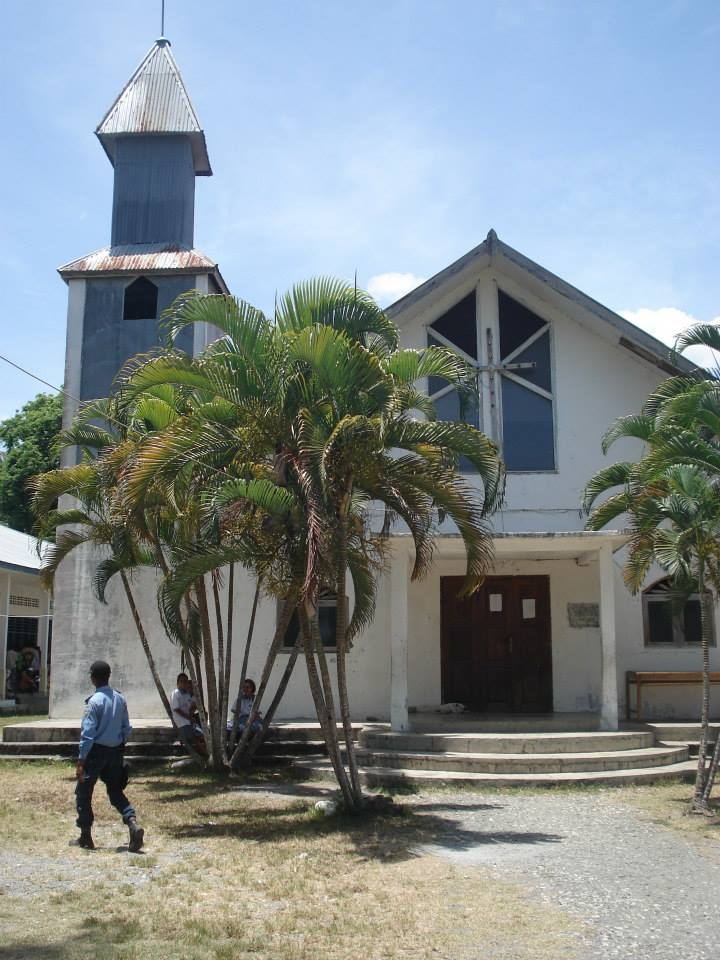
Church of Fatuberlio

Fatuberliu is a town in the Fatuberlio Subdistrict, Manufahi District of Timor-Leste. Its population at the 2004 census was 6,902 (2010).
