= Soibada =

Town in East Timor

Coordinates: 8.86°S 125.94°E

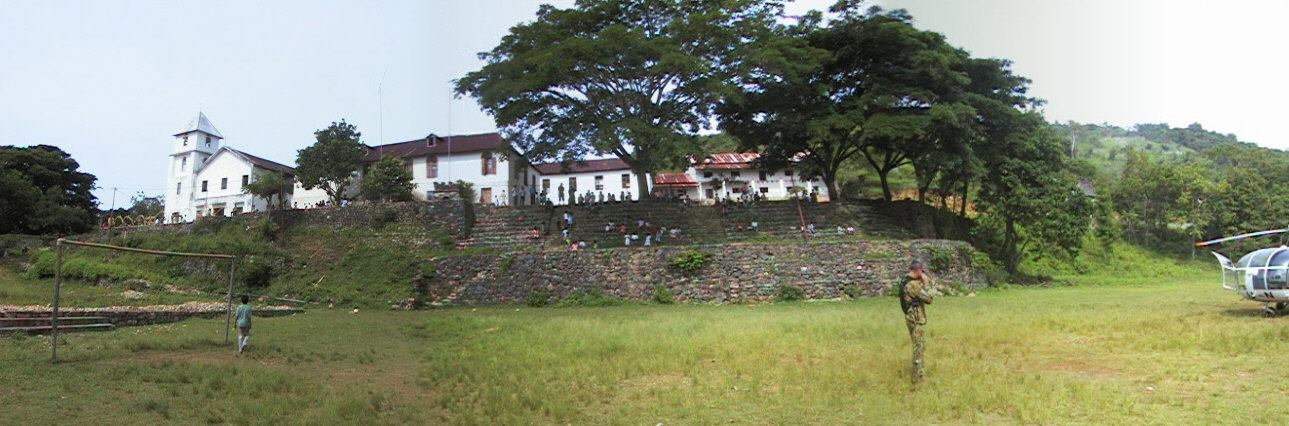
Colégio in Soibada

Soibada is a town in the Soibada Administrative Post, Manatuto District of East Timor. Its population at the 2004 census was 2,692.

Climate

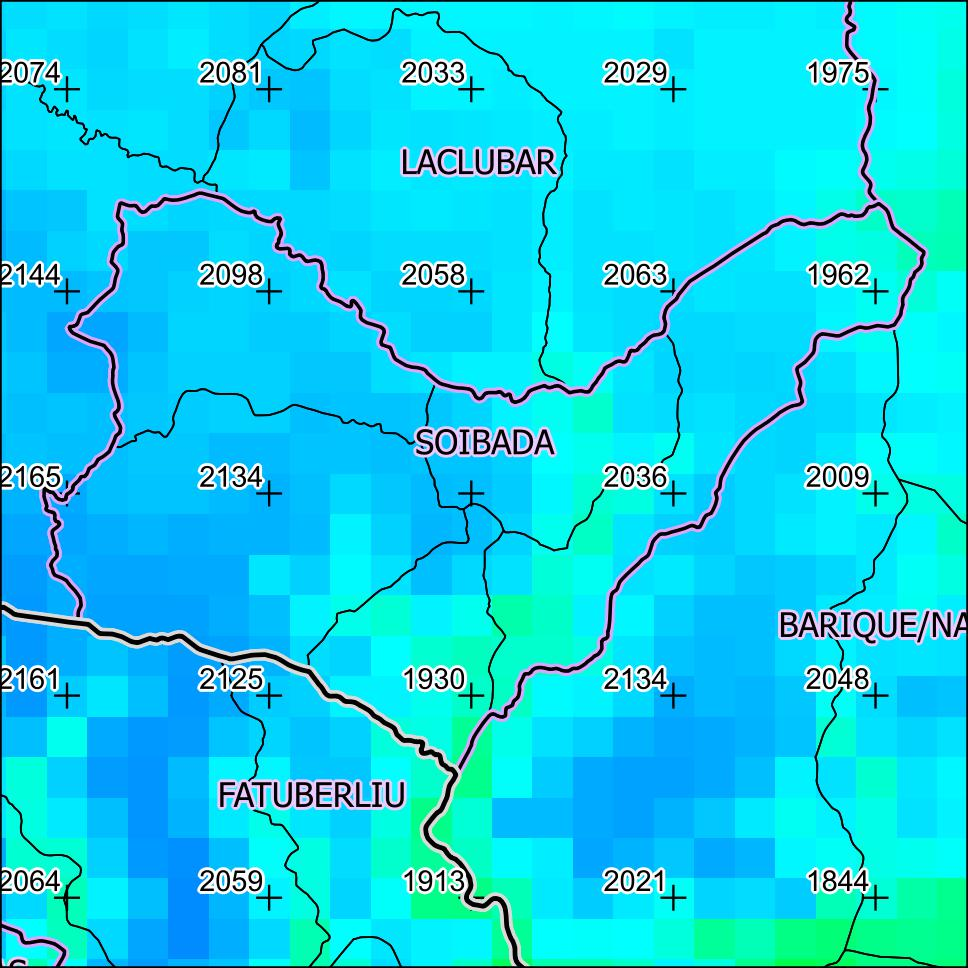
Annual rainfall (2000)

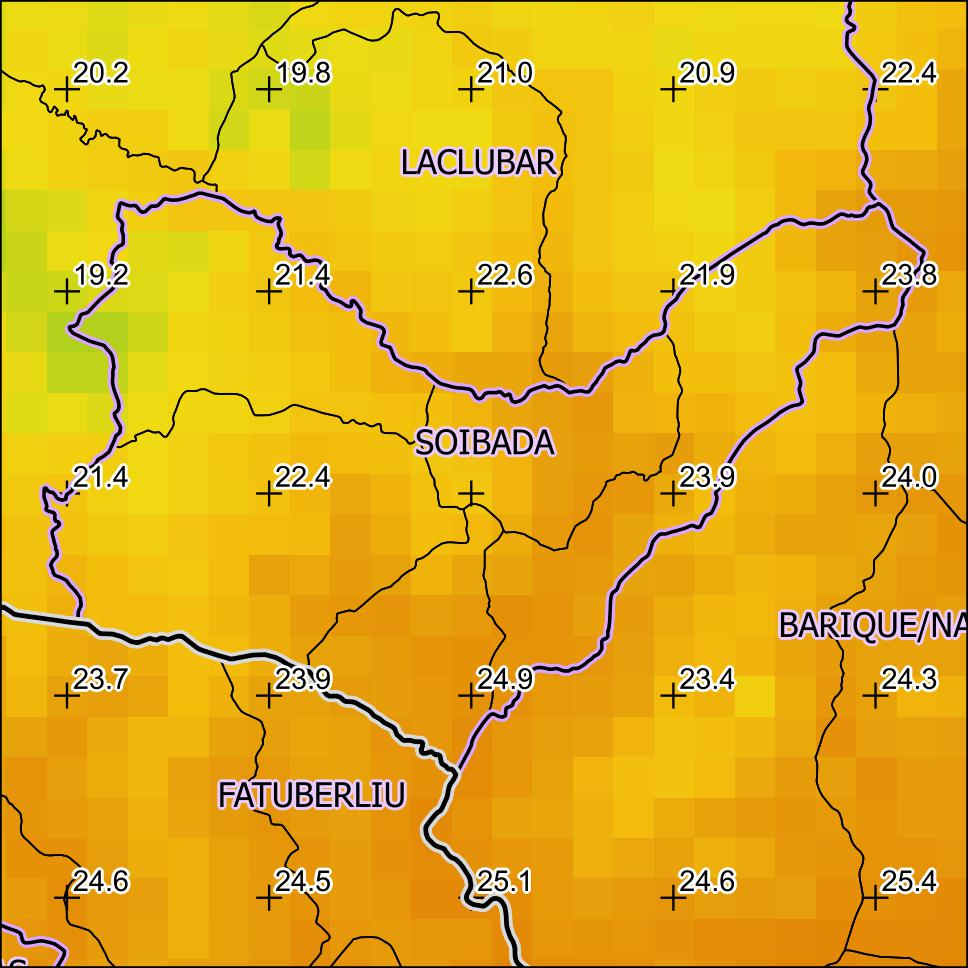
Temperature (2000)

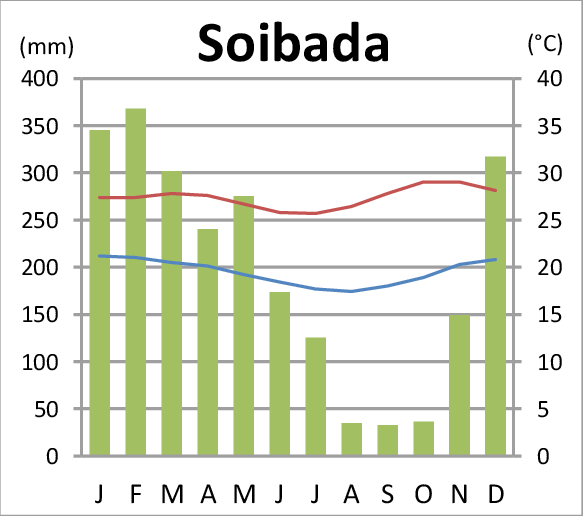
