= Betano =

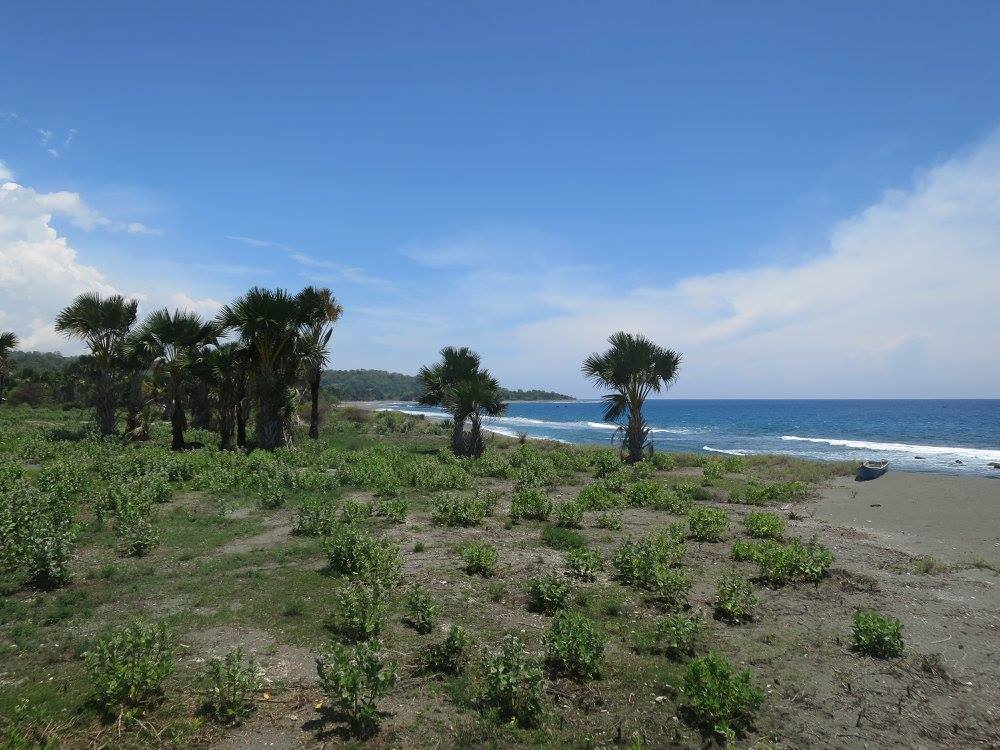

- Location in Timor-Leste
- Coordinates: 9°9′52″S 125°43′30″E
- Country: Timor-Leste
- District: Manufahi District
- Subdistrict: Same
- Suco: Betano
- Climate: Aw

Betano is a village and suco in the southwest of Manufahi District, Timor-Leste. In 2004, the suco had 4,577 inhabitants.

The Betano Power Station, located in the Betano suco, is the biggest electricity station in Timor by capacity. It supplies the South coast of the country with electricity.

== History ==
Betano was a traditional Timorese kingdom in former times. The Kingdom of We Hale with their mighty King Nai Loro Tiris

HMAS Voyager became grounded at the bay at Betano after offloading the 2/4th Independent Company on 25 September 1942. The ship was blown up and scuttled after it could not be refloated. On 1 December 1942, HMAS Armidale was sunk by 13 Japanese aircraft, while attempting to evacuate Australian and Dutch soldiers and deliver a relief contingent.
