= Turiscai Administrative Post =

Administrative post in Manufahi Municipality, Timor-Leste

Turiscai
- Administrative Post
- Posto Administrativo de Turiscai (Portuguese); Postu administrativu Turiskai (Tetun)
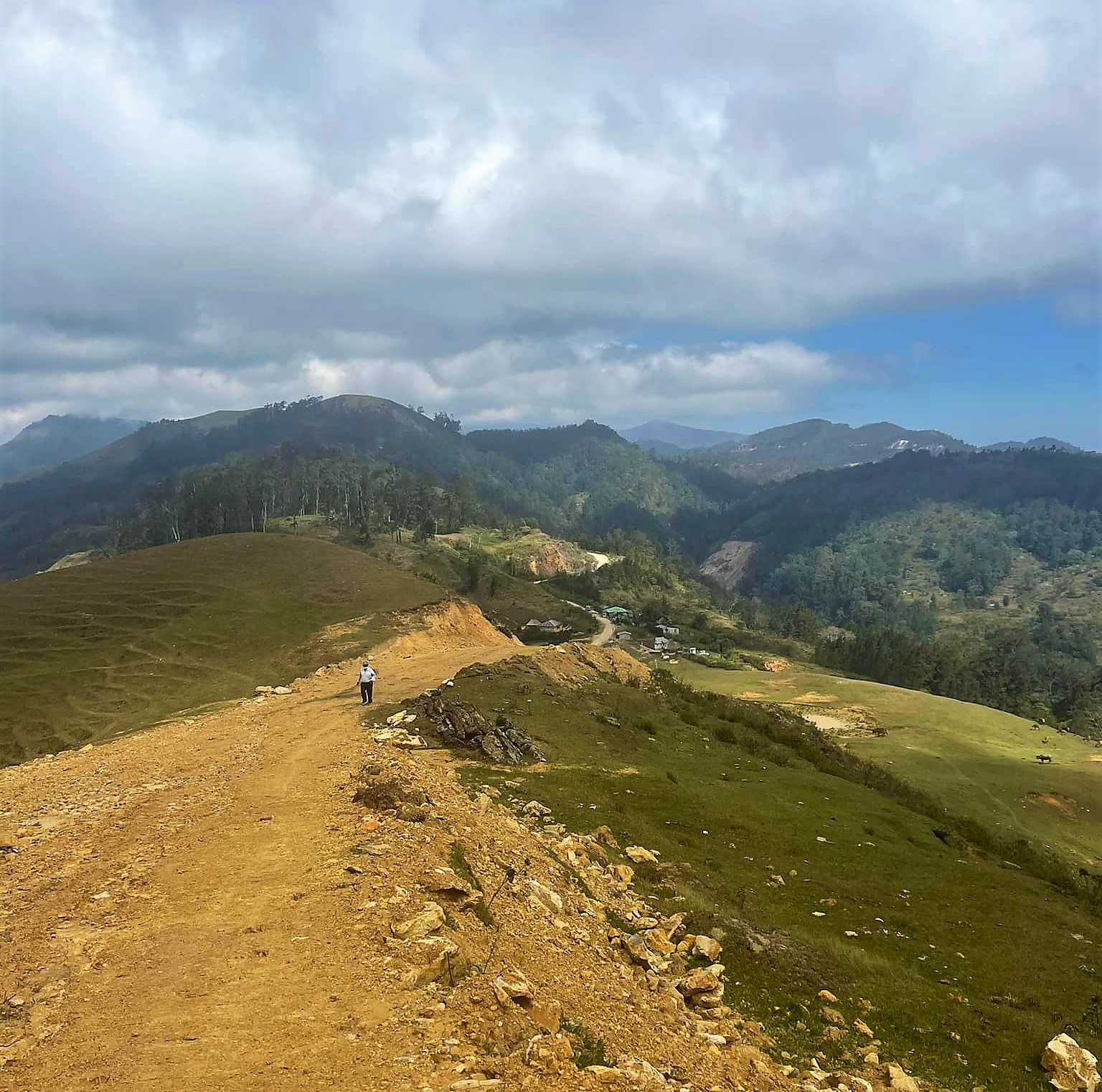
- Turiscai landscape

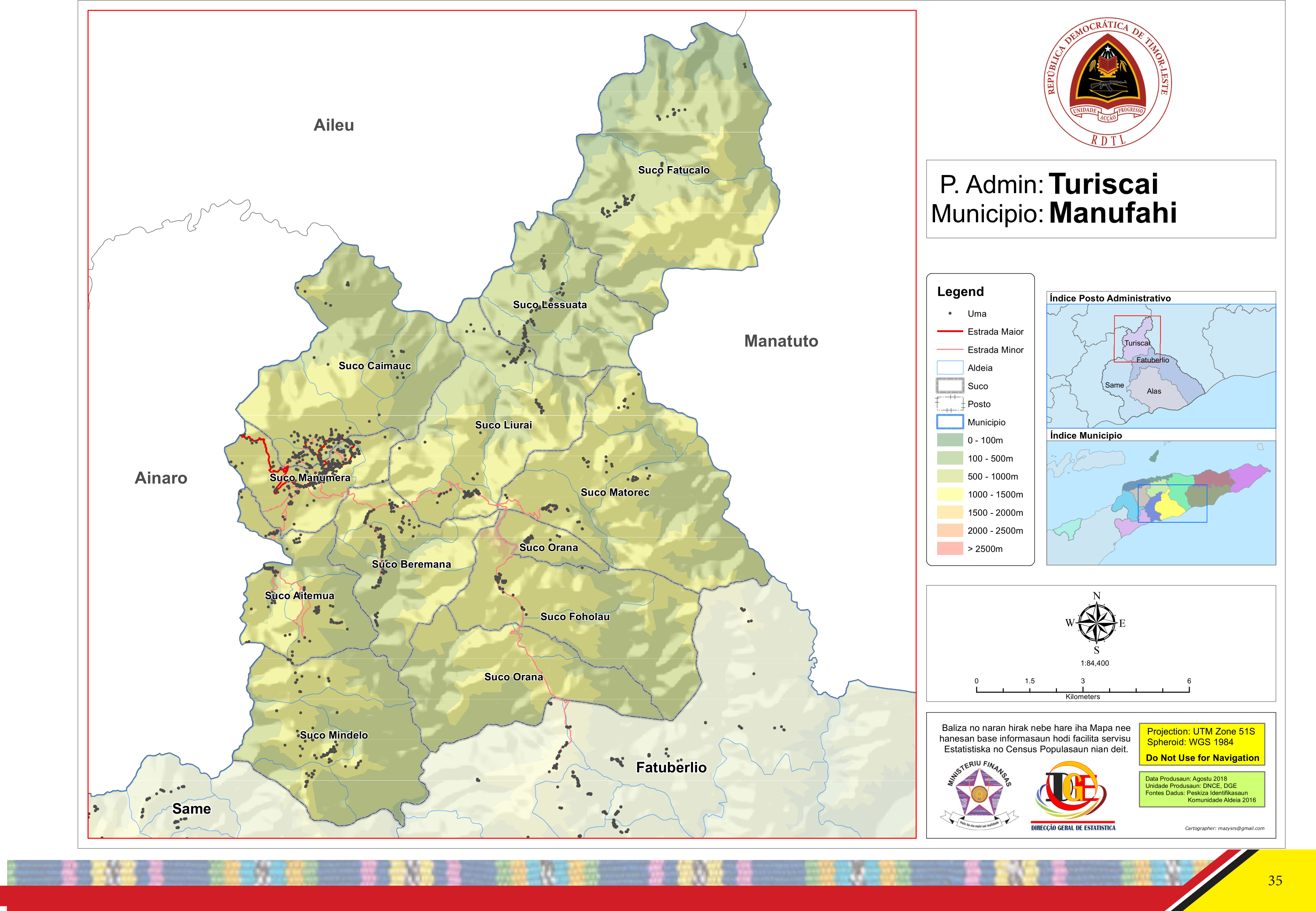
- Official map

- Location within East Timor
- Coordinates: 8°49′S 125°42′E
- Country: Timor-Leste
- Municipality: Manufahi
- Seat: Manumera
- Sucos: Aitemua; Beremana; Caimauc; Fatucalo; Foholau; Lessuata; Liurai; Manumera; Matorec; Mindelo; Orana

Area
  - Total: 197.9 km^{2} (76.4 sq mi)

Population (2015 census)
  - Total: 7,718
  - Density: 39.00/km^{2} (101.0/sq mi)

Households (2015 census)
  - Total: 1,121
- Time zone: UTC+09:00 (TLT)

Turiscai, officially Turiscai Administrative Post (Portuguese: Posto Administrativo de Turiscai, Tetun: Postu administrativu Turiskai), is an administrative post (and was formerly a subdistrict) in the Manufahi municipality of Timor-Leste. Its seat or administrative centre is Manumera.
