= Turiscai =

Village in East Timor

Coordinates: 8.823°S 125.707°E

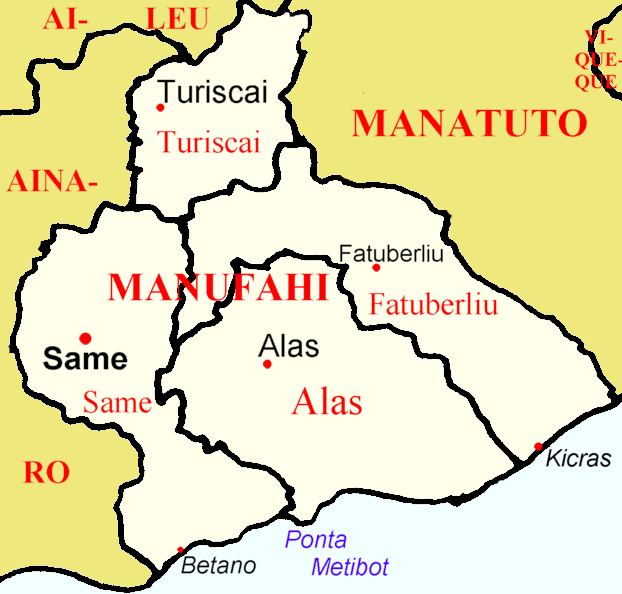

Turiscai is a village in the Turiscai administrative post, Manufahi municipality of Timor-Leste. Turiskai in Mambai language means "Turibaum".

== History ==
During the Indonesian occupation of East Timor, on 22 February Indonesian soldiers committed what is now known as the Foholau, Turiscai or Saibailolo Gorge massacre, the soldiers rounded up around 30 civilian detainees in Turiscai, separating the men, women and children. They took 13 of the 15 male detainees nearby to a cliff overlooking the Saibailolo Gorge and opened fire on them, only one of them survived. The next day they executed the last two men who were brothers, one of them having been a former village chief in nearby Hulala.
