= Fatuberlio Administrative Post =

Administrative post in Manufahi Municipality, Timor-Leste

Fatuberlio
- Administrative Post
- Posto Administrativo de Fatuberlio (Portuguese); Postu administrativu Fatu-Berliu (Tetum)
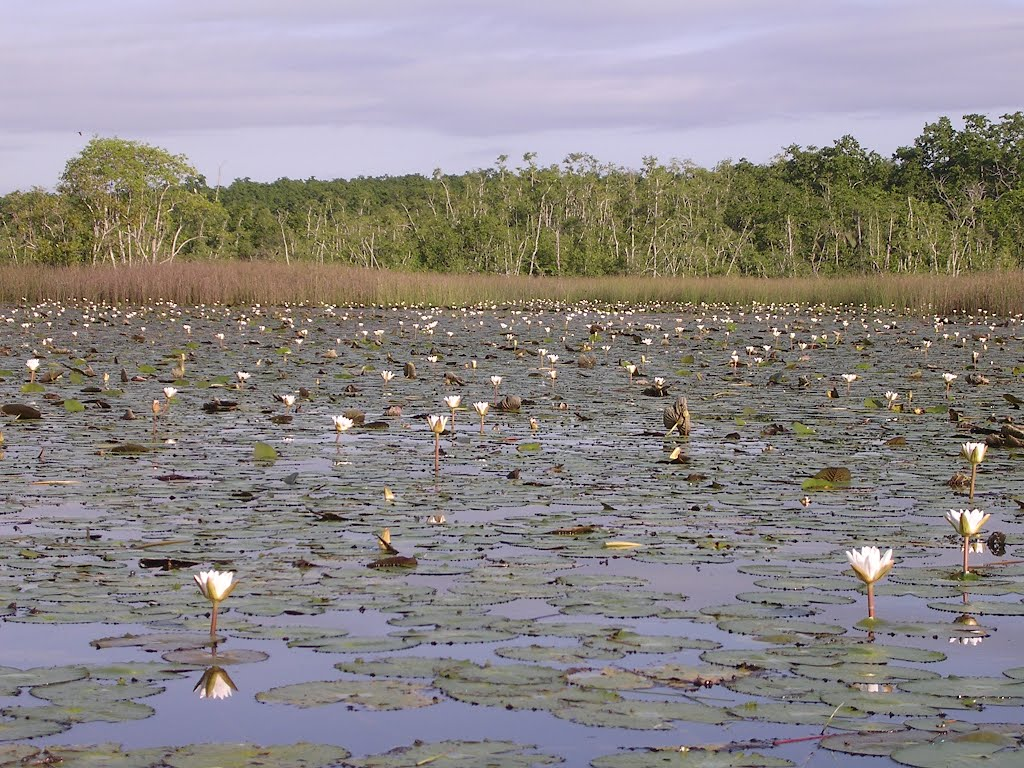
- Waterlilies on Lake Modo Mahut, Welaluhu

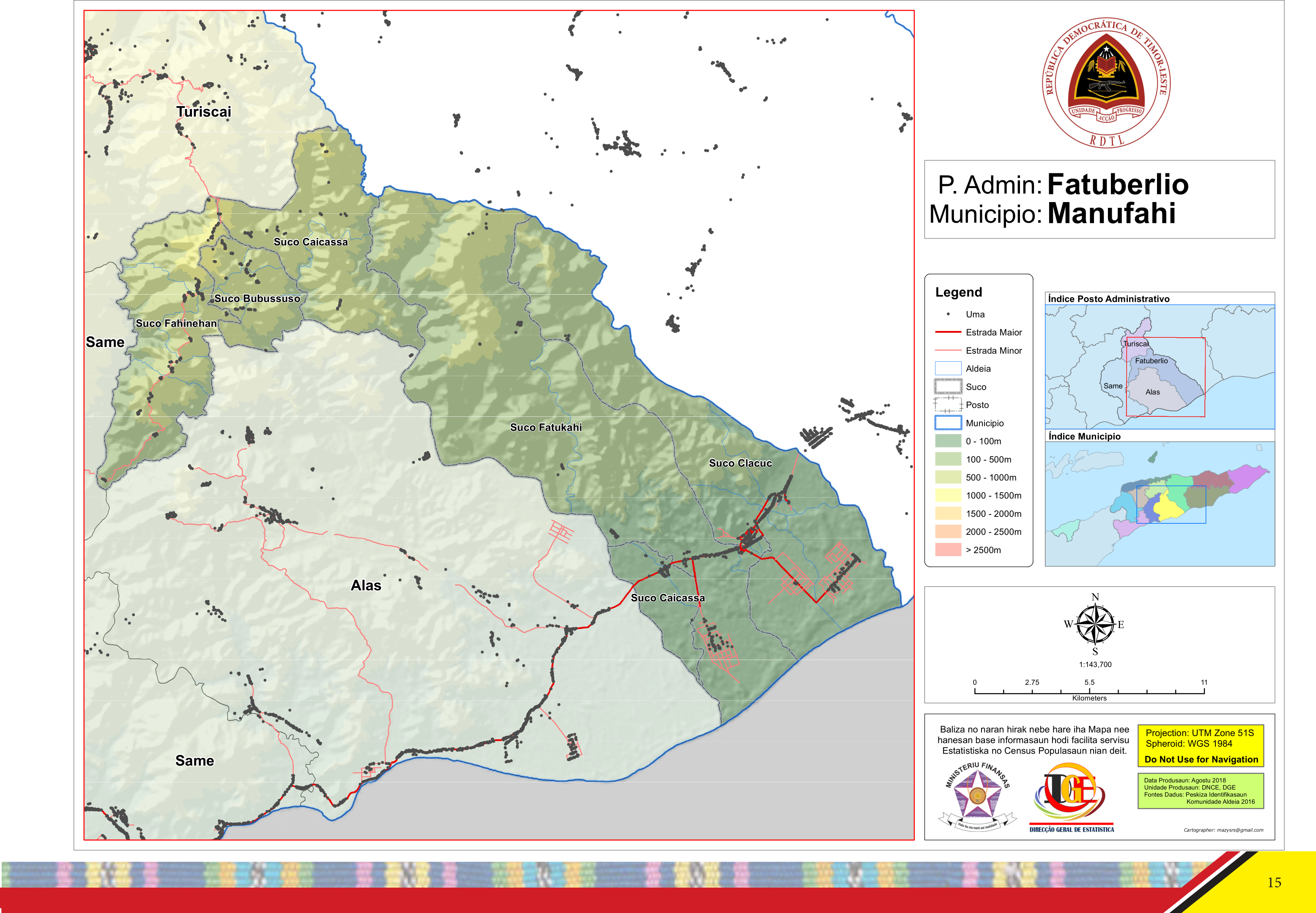
- Official map

- Location within East Timor
- Coordinates: 8°57′S 125°52′E
- Country: Timor-Leste
- Municipality: Manufahi
- Seat: Clacuc
- Sucos: Bubussuso; Caicassa; Clacuc; Fahinehan; Fatucahi

Area
  - Total: 375.0 km^{2} (144.8 sq mi)

Population (2015 census)
  - Total: 7,416
  - Density: 19.78/km^{2} (51.22/sq mi)

Households (2015 census)
  - Total: 1,252
- Time zone: UTC+09:00 (TLT)

Fatuberlio, officially Fatuberlio Administrative Post (Portuguese: Posto Administrativo de Fatuberlio, Tetum: Postu administrativu Fatu-Berliu), is an administrative post (and was formerly a subdistrict) in the Manufahi municipality of Timor-Leste. Its seat or administrative centre is Clacuc.
