= Same, Timor-Leste =

Same
- City
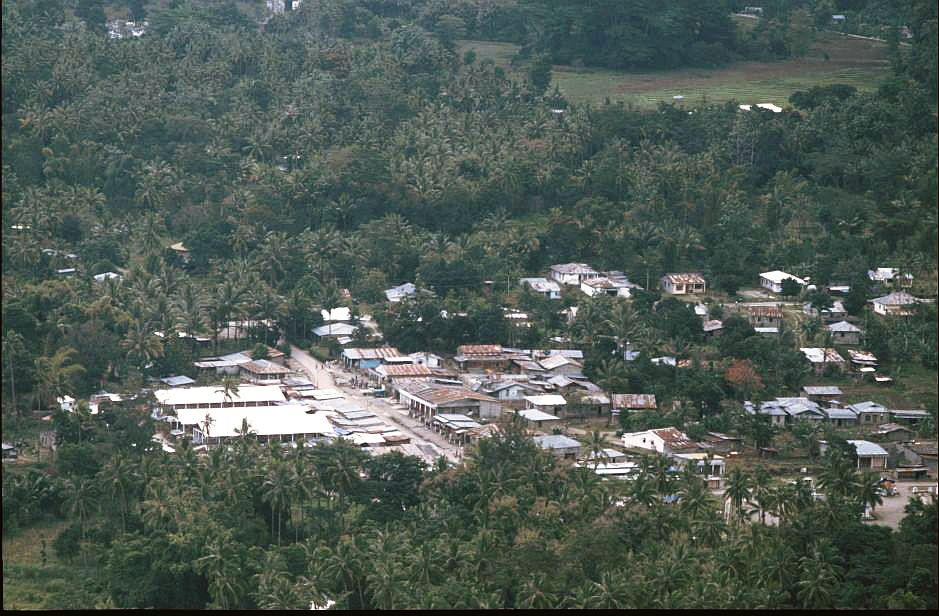

- Location in Timor-Leste
- Coordinates: 9°00′12″S 125°38′49″E
- Country: Timor-Leste
- Municipality: Manufahi

Area
  - Total: 355.28 km^{2} (137.17 sq mi)
- Elevation: 384 m (1,260 ft)

Population (2015 census)
  - Total: 7,413
  - Density: 20.87/km^{2} (54.04/sq mi)
- Time zone: UTC+09:00 (TLT)
- Climate: Am

Same (Portuguese pronunciation: [ˈsamɛ]) is a city in the Same administrative post in the interior of Timor-Leste, 81 kilometres (50 mi) south of Dili, the national capital. Same has a population of 7,413 and is the capital of Manufahi municipality, which was known as Same District in Portuguese Timor.

During the Portuguese colonial period, the district was named after Same, its capital. In the time of the Estado Novo, the place in Vila Filomeno da Câmara was renamed after the former governor of Portuguese Timor Filomeno da Câmara de Melo Cabral.

After Timor-Leste's independence from Indonesia, the town was almost completely destroyed by Indonesian militias A rebuilding project called Friends of Same is currently helping rebuild the city, along with UN envoys. During the 2006 East Timorese crisis, the Battle of Same took place in the area.

== Geography ==
The city is located in the interior of the island, 49 kilometres (30 mi) south of the provincial capital of Dili, at an altitude of 384 metres (1,260 ft), south of the mountain Cabalaki (Foho Kabulaki). The centre is located in the Suco Letefoho in which are situated the districts Ria-Lau (Rialau) Manico 1, 2 Manico, Cotalala (Kotalala), Rai-Ubo (Raiubu) and Akadiruhun. The suburbs Manikun, Lia-Nai (Lianai), Maibuti (Maihuti), Raimera (Raimerak), Searema (Scarema, Serema), Uma-Liurai (Umaliurai, Umahurai), Nunu-Fu (Nunufu), Babulo und Lapuro (Laiuru) are in the Suco Babulo. An overland road leads from Same to Maubisse in the north and Betano in the south. One branch leads to Alas and Welaluhu in the East. Both Sucos are classified as "urban". Same has 11,258 inhabitants (2010).

== Infrastructure ==
There is a preschool, six primary schools, three secondary schools and one pre-secondary school. There is also a police station, a helipad and a community health centre. From the old market building, only the concrete walls are left since its destruction by the Indonesians. Also in ruins is the ancient Catholic Church. However, it had already been destroyed in the Second World War by the Japanese.

== Organisation ==
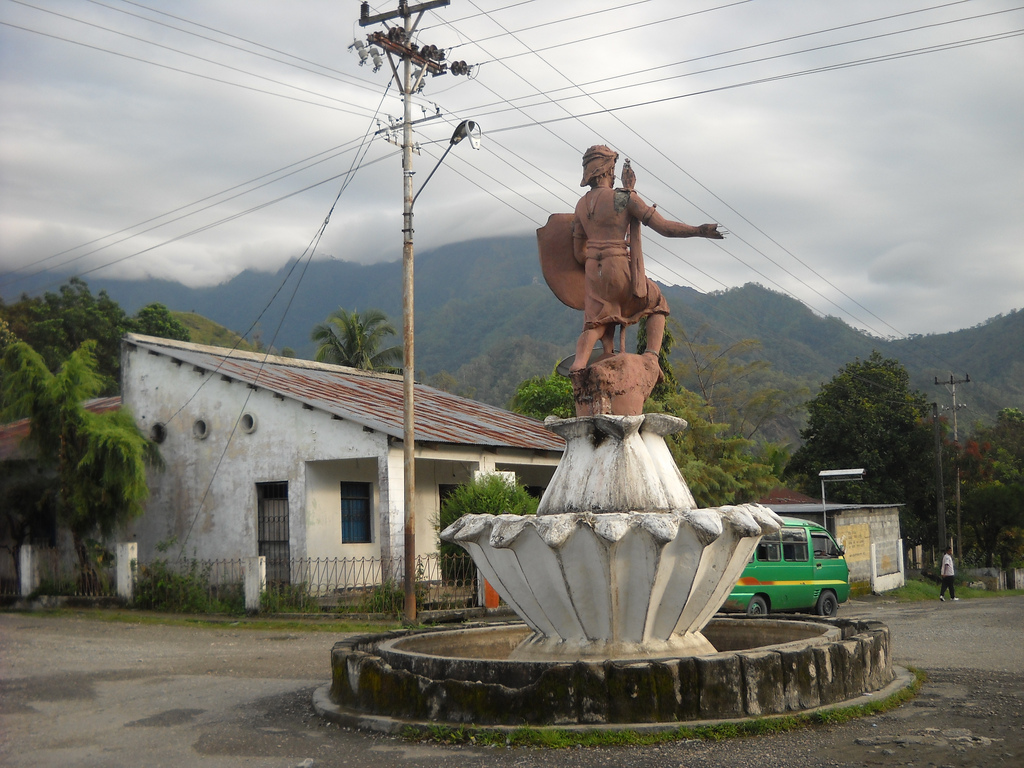
Portuguese statue in central Same

Same is divided into eight Sucos: Babulo (Babulu) Betano, Dai-Sua (Daisua, Daisula) Grotu (Gratu) Holarua, Letefoho, Rotuto (Rotutu) and Tutuluro. Letefoho and Babulo are classified as urban. To the northeast are the Subdistricts Turiscai and Fatuberlio, east of the subdistrict Alas. In the northwest and west borders on the Same District Ainaro with its sub-districts Maubisse, Hatu-Builico and Hato-Udo. To the south is the Timor Sea. The Caraulun river system runs through the north of Same before it opens as a border river to Ainaro in the Timor Sea. Its most important tributary, the Sui, follows the northeastern border to Alas and Fatuberlio. At its mouth is the small Quelun, the river forming the border of Alas in the south.

The sub-district has 27 554 inhabitants Same (2010, 2004: 26 066). The largest language group consists of the speakers of the national language Bunak. The average age is 18.3 years (2010, 2004: 18.2 years).

The Administrator of the subdistrict is Adão Mendes (April 2010).

66% of households in Same grow manioc, 65% corn, 52% coconut, 54% vegetables, 44% coffee and 15% rice. In 2010, the inhabitants of the Sucos Holarua, Grotu, Dai-Sua and Rotuto complained that they constantly suffer from a shortage of food because their soils are not sufficiently productive. In Rotuto, fields have also been destroyed by storms and landslides.

== History ==
=== Kingdom of Manufahi and Portuguese rule ===
Same was the capital of the kingdom of Manufahi. Boaventura, the Liurai of Manufahi and his father Duarte (1895–1912), led several major revolts against the former Portuguese colonial power. At this time Boaventura united several Timorese kingdoms into the largest resistance movement, which the Portuguese met with during the colonial period. It was only during the rebellion of Manufahi in 1911-1912 that Boaventura was finally defeated and captured, during the uprising in Betano, by the loyal Timorese and Portuguese-African troops from Mozambique, and sometimes even from Angola. He died shortly afterwards on the island of Atauro. East Timorese sources estimate that in the last revolt 15,000-25,000 people were killed and many thousands more were captured and imprisoned.

In the area of today's Suco of Dai-Sua, one of the largest massacres in Portuguese colonial history occurred in August 1912. About 3,000 men, women and children died.

During the Second World War, Portuguese Timor was occupied by the Japanese. During the Battle of Timor, Australian troops offered resistance through guerrilla warfare. The Australian reinforcements came via the Port of Betano. The Australian destroyer HMAS Voyager was lost here. The Roman Catholic Church of Same, whose ruins remain, was destroyed during the occupation.

During the civil war between FRETILIN and UDT in the last days of Portuguese colonial rule, on 11 August 1975, most residents of Letefoho fled from their homes to the mountains. They feared abduction by the UDT after the killing of 11 FRETILIN supporters in the Wedauberek massacre in the Alas sub-district.

=== Indonesian rule ===
In 1975 the Indonesians marched into East Timor. By October 1976 the most important cities such as Same had been occupied.

On 27 January 1976, FRETILIN fighters rounded up eight UDT prisoners in Hat Nipah and killed all but two of them, one which was later stabbed in the stomach with a spear and shot dead in a cornfield in Holarua the next day. 11 more prisoners were taken out of the elementary school in Same and knowing they were going to be executed, they all jumped out of the truck, nine of the prisoners successfully escaped with the other two had been shot dead. On 29 January, in anger the FRETILIN fighters stormed into the elementary school and opened fire on the prisoners killing 30 of them, leaving only three survivors who had either played dead or had escaped by jumping out a window.

On 20 August 1982 Falintil fighters attacked the Indonesian Hansip (local security officer) in Rotuto. This was part of the Cabalaki uprising, in which several Indonesian bases in the region were attacked simultaneously. The Indonesians immediately sent troops to the region. Houses were burned down, schools closed, and women and children forced to stand guard in a military post. Also, it came to forced relocation, arson, looting and rape. Falintil fighters and a large part of the population fled the area.

In 1999, the city of Same was almost entirely destroyed by pro-Indonesian militias, during the general upheaval following the independence referendum in East Timor.

=== Post-independence ===
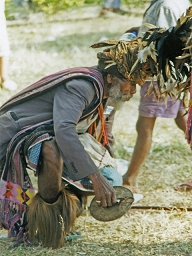
Performance in traditional attire during Xanana Gusmão's visit to Same in 2000

In 2001, the Australian city of Boroondara, Victoria founded the Friends of Same, which supports aid projects in the region.

The Battle of Same, as part of the 2006 East Timorese crisis, resulted in the Australians successfully securing the target compound and defeating the small rebel Petitioner force led by Alfredo Reinado, before the assault was called off by the Timor-Leste government.

On 1 March 2007, the fugitive rebel leader Alfredo Reinado came to Same together with 150 men of the Australian ISF, including soldiers. He was joined by Gastão Salsinha, and Leonardo Isaac, another leader of the rebel soldiers and the Member of Parliament of the Partido Social Democrata (PSD) – to render assistance. About a hundred residents fled. On 4 March the Australian Army, with the support of helicopters and armoured vehicles, stormed the place. Five rebels were killed there, while none of the Australians were injured. Reinado escaped, as did Gastão Salsinha and his men. Leonardo Isaac was uninjured. Some rebels were captured.

Four days later about ten houses in the nearby village Searema were destroyed during a night search operation by Australian soldiers in search of Reinado. The Australian army denies the destruction and claims there was only minor damage, of which soldiers later helped in the repair. Australian soldiers also carried out an aggressive search in the village of Sasaneh. Furniture was damaged and the residents were rounded up with hands raised.

The old market of Same was destroyed by the Indonesian army and in 2010 has still not been rebuilt.

== Sister cities ==
Same has one sister city.

- Boroondara, Australia (2001)

== Notable residents ==
- Isabel da Costa Ferreira (1974–2023), jurist, human rights activist, politician, first lady (2012–2017) and spouse of the Prime Minister (2018–2023)
