= Manufahi Municipality =

Municipality of East Timor

Manufahi
- Municipality of Timor-Leste
- Município Manufahi (Portuguese); Munisípiu Manufahi (Tetun)
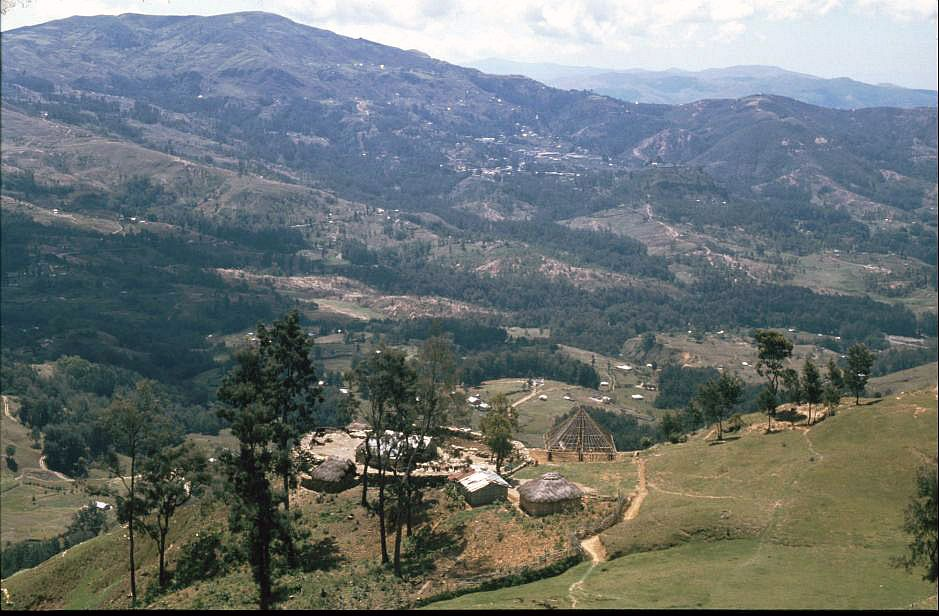
- Landscape between Dili and Same

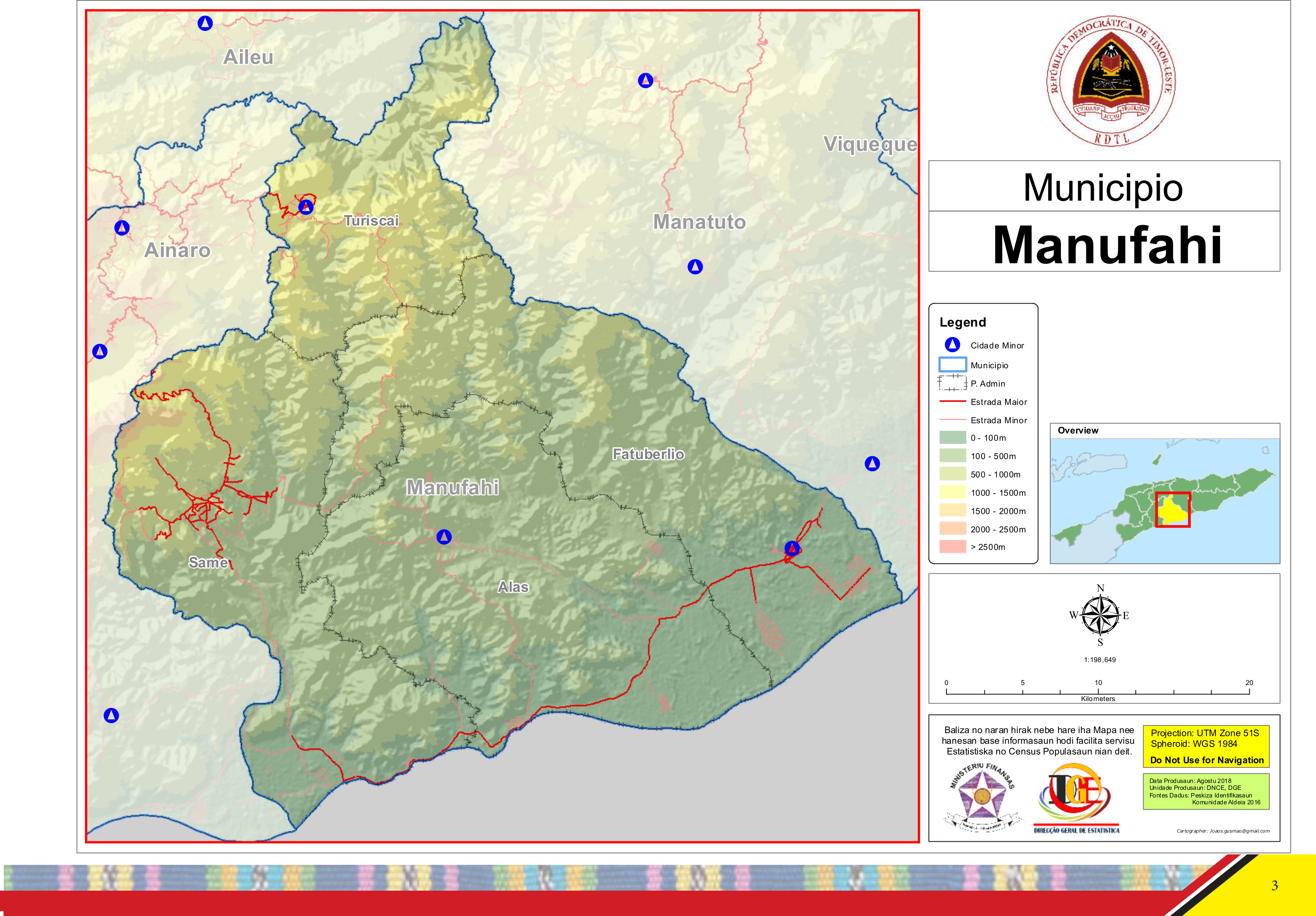
- Official map

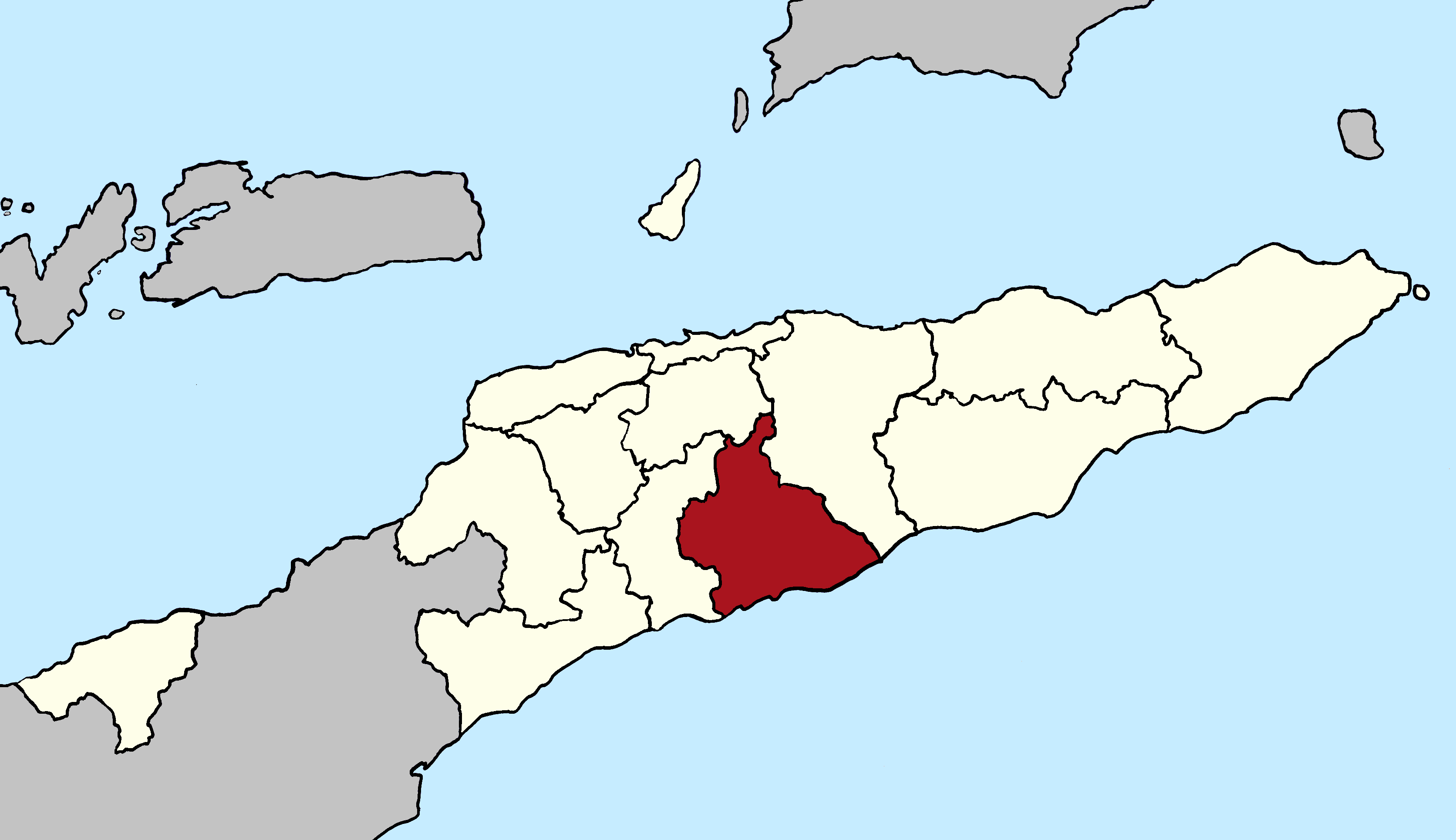
- Manufahi in Timor-Leste
- Interactive map of Manufahi
- Coordinates: 9°00′S 125°47′E
- Country: Timor-Leste
- Capital: Same
- Administrative posts: Alas; Fatuberlio; Same; Turiscai

Area
  - Total: 1,332.5 km^{2} (514.5 sq mi)
  - Rank: 6th

Population (2015 census)
  - Total: 53,691
  - Rank: 11th
  - Density: 40.293/km^{2} (104.36/sq mi)
  - Rank: 11th

Households (2015 census)
  - Total: 9,023
  - Rank: 11th
- Time zone: UTC+09:00 (TLT)
- ISO 3166 code: TL-MF
- HDI (2017): 0.618 medium · 3rd
- Website: Manufahi Municipality

Manufahi (Portuguese: Município Manufahi, Tetun: Munisípiu Manufahi) is one of the municipalities of Timor-Leste. It has a population of 53,691 (2015 census) and an area of 1,323 km^{2}. The capital of the municipality is Same.

== Toponymy ==
The municipality's current name, Manufahi, is said to be derived from Maun Fahe, the Tetun language expression for 'divided brothers'. According to legend, there was a fight between two related tribes, or a group of siblings. Eventually, the protagonists agreed to subject themselves to a single ruler.

During the Portuguese colonial era, the then district bore the name of its main town, Same. The present name was adopted on the basis of the divided brothers legend. However, it was misspelled, and the Tetun language meaning of the misspelled name is 'pig chicken'.

Efforts are being made to correct the name. However, there is another legend that in the suco of Daisula a rooster once flew down from a mountain, landed on the back of a pig, and then travelled with the pig to many places before returning home.

== Geography ==
Manufahi extends from the central highlands of Timor-Leste to its south coast, on the Timor Sea. It is bordered by Manatuto to the east, Ainaro to the west, and Aileu to the north.

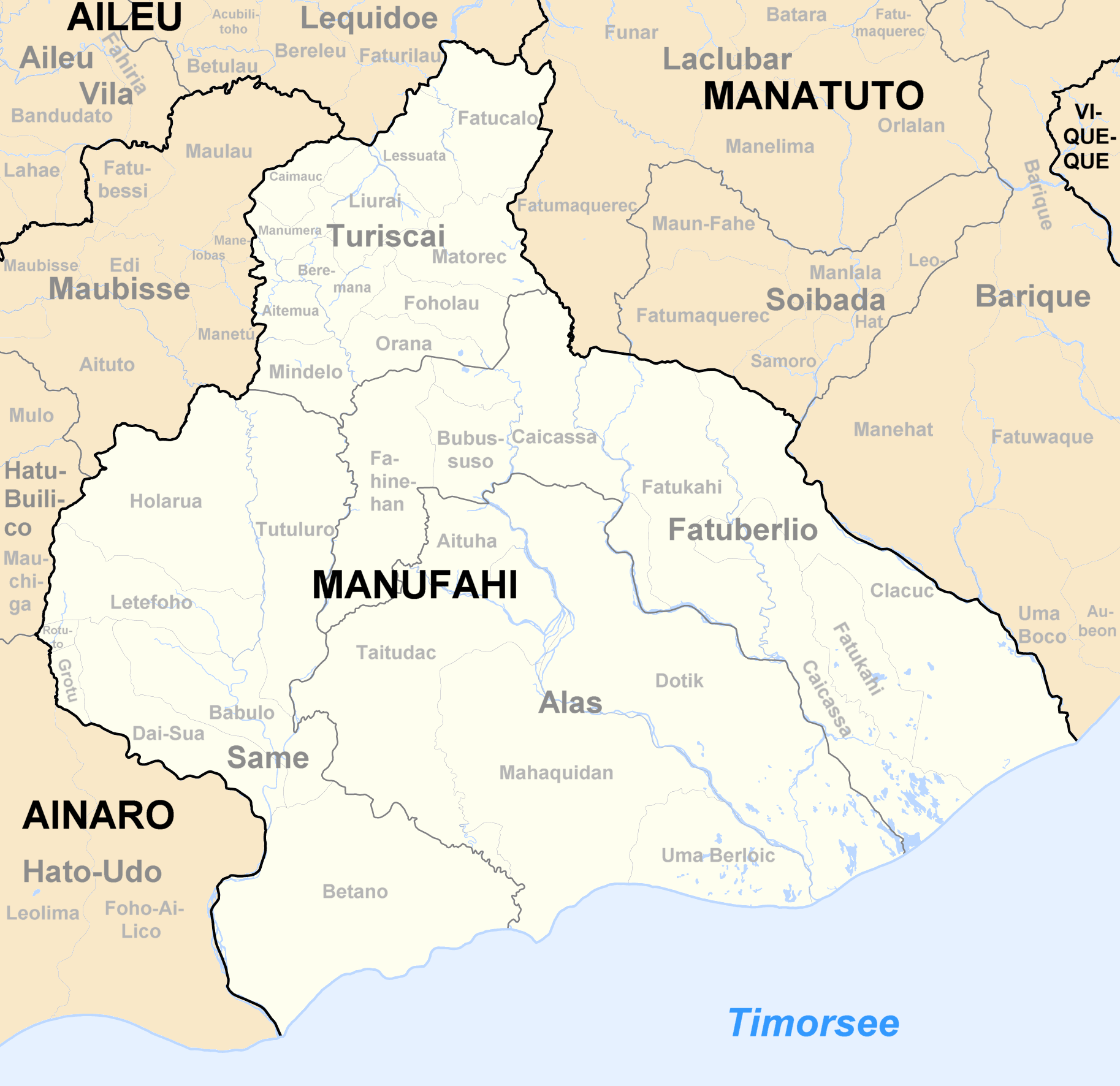
Administrative posts of Manufahi

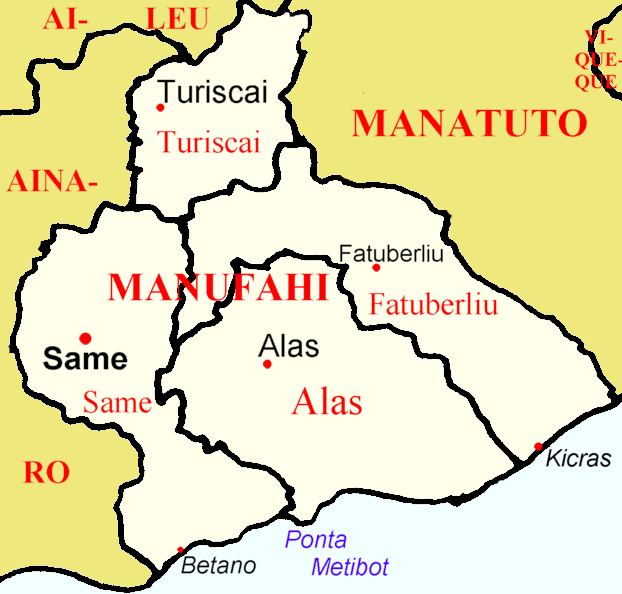
Cities of Manufahi

== History ==
According to a list prepared by Afonso de Castro, governor of the colony of Portuguese Timor from 1859 to 1863, Manufahi was one of 47 kingdoms in that colony at the time.

During its time as a Portuguese colony, the municipality was called Same, after the capital city. It was the epicentre of the Great Rebellion of 1910–12. During the Indonesian occupation the then subdistrict of Hato-Udo was split off from the then district of Manufahi and joined to Ainaro, and the then subdistrict of Turiscai, previously in Ainaro, was moved to Manufahi.

== Administrative posts ==
Manufahi's administrative posts (formerly sub-districts) are:

- Alas
- Fatuberlio
- Same
- Turiscai

== Demographics ==
Besides the national official languages of Tetun and Portuguese, the Malayo-Polynesian language Mambai is also spoken.
