= Indonesia–Timor-Leste relations =

- Timor-Leste: Indonesia

Diplomatic mission
- Indonesian Embassy, Dili: Timor Leste Embassy, Jakarta

Timor-Leste (formerly East Timor) and Indonesia established diplomatic relations on 2 July 2002. Both share the island of Timor. East Timor occupies the east of the island of Timor. In addition, the country includes an exclave in the west of the island and two other small islands. Indonesia owns the rest of Timor and all neighbouring islands to the west, north and east.

Portugal took control of the territory that would become known as Portuguese Timor in the middle of the 18th century, and maintained the eastern half of the island and West Timor was a Dutch possession until World War II as a colony. The land border with Indonesia is 228 km long. Indonesia already had a consulate in Dili during the Portuguese colonial period.

Indonesia invaded the former Portuguese colony in 1975 and annexed East Timor in 1976, maintaining East Timor as its 27th province until a United Nations sponsored referendum in 1999, in which the people of East Timor chose independence. Following a United Nations interim administration, East Timor gained independence as Timor Leste in 2002. Indonesia formalized their relations by establishing an embassy in Dili since October 2002, Timor Leste has an embassy in Jakarta and consulates in Denpasar and Kupang. Relations between the two countries are generally considered highly positive, despite various problems. Numerous agreements regulate cooperation in different areas. East Timorese are visa-free in Indonesia.

== History ==
=== Sukarno's government's view of East Timor ===
Indonesia declared independence from the Dutch East Indies in 1945, following World War II. Nonetheless, Timor-Leste remained as the colony of Portuguese Timor, subject to the Republic of Portugal and its government, Estado Novo. During this time, Indonesia did not express any interest in Portuguese Timor. Though at one point, Indonesia was accused of being behind two rebellions against the Portuguese. In 1961, the Prime Minister of Indonesia, Sukarno visited Portugal. During this visit, Sukarno assured the Prime Minister of Portugal Salazar that Portuguese rights on Timor would be respected. In multiple public statements, Indonesian officials repeatedly stressed that Indonesia had no claim to Portuguese Timor, only claiming the territory of the disbanded Dutch East Indies. The reason for this was also the tying up of Indonesian forces in West New Guinea, where they were trying to legitimize and consolidate power from the Dutch. Doubts remained about the statement, however, due to the prevalent anti western-colonial polemics and rhetoric taken by the government of Indonesia and the public under President Sukarno's Old order (orde lama).

=== Under the New Order ===
"We no longer think about that, although it was not long ago."

— President José Ramos-Horta's opinion on Soeharto.

Coat of arms of occupied East Timor (Timor Timur)

When Portugal's left-leaning^{[a]} Carnation Revolution succeeded in 1974, Portugal declared its intent to give its former colony independence and local parties formed, intending to contest East Timor's first free elections scheduled for 1976. With Sukarno's arrest and death following the 30 September Movement, Indonesia's government was now led by a western-aligned and ardent anti-communist; General Suharto. Indonesia, then firmly-rooted in the anti-Soviet camp in Southeast Asia, was alarmed by the left-leaning parties that looked set to win that election. With this, the newly made East Timorese party, Timorese Popular Democratic Association (APODETI), was financed by the New Order Government and propagated the annexation to Indonesia. Support for this among the East Timorese population was limited. When it became apparent that the leftist Fretilin would probably take over the leadership of the country in elections, the conservative Timorese Democratic Union (UDT) attempted a coup d'état in August 1975. However, Fretilin emerged victorious from the short civil war. The Portuguese administration had withdrawn from the colonial capital Dili. UDT and APODETI supporters fled to Indonesia. As a result, Indonesian troops, disguised as supporters of these parties, occupied the border regions of East Timor. To counter the threat, Fretilin unilaterally declared independence on 28 November 1975. Indonesia responded by reporting that the leaders of UDT, APODETI and other parties had signed the so-called Balibo Declaration on 30 November 1975, calling for East Timor's annexation to Indonesia. However, the declaration, a draft of the Indonesian secret service, was signed in Bali and not in Balibo, probably under pressure from the Indonesian government. The signatories were more or less prisoners of Indonesia. Xanana Gusmão called the paper the "Balibohong Declaration", a pun on the Indonesian word for "lie" (bohong).

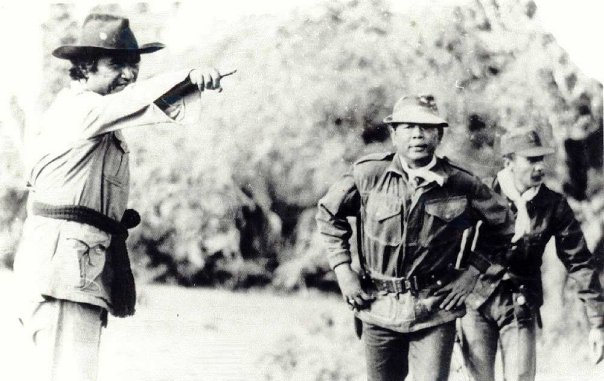
Colonel Dading Kalbuadi led the invasion of East Timor (1975)

On 7 December 1975, the open invasion of East Timor began with the approval of US president Gerald R. Ford and US secretary of state Henry A. Kissinger. In 1976, Indonesia officially declared the annexation of East Timor, but this annexation was not recognised internationally, because Australia and Indonesia were the only nations in the world which recognised East Timor as a province of Indonesia. Other governments, including the governments of the United States, Japan, Canada, and Malaysia, also supported the Indonesian government. A 24-year guerrilla war ensued, during which fighting, reprisals by the occupying forces, hunger and disease killed about 183,000 out of a total East Timorese population of 800,000. Falintil, the armed wing of the leftist^{[b]} East Timorese political party Fretilin became the major source of resistance to Indonesia's annexation of East Timor, but eventually, military resistance to Indonesia's occupation of East Timor was almost eliminated. For 20 years, the poet and semi-professional football goalkeeper Xanana Gusmão led a low-level insurrection against the occupation, and diplomatic pressure was also placed on Indonesia. Gusmão became Timor-Leste's first president following its independence. Only after the fall of Suharto's dictatorship did Indonesia agree to hold an independence referendum in East Timor in 1999. The result was clearly in favour of complete independence for East Timor, whereupon Indonesian security forces and pro-Indonesian militias overran East Timor once again, with a wave of violence in Operation Thunder. A large number of people either had to flee their homes or they were forcibly deported. Large parts of East Timor's infrastructure were destroyed.

=== Pro-Independence and Pro-Democracy student solidarity ===
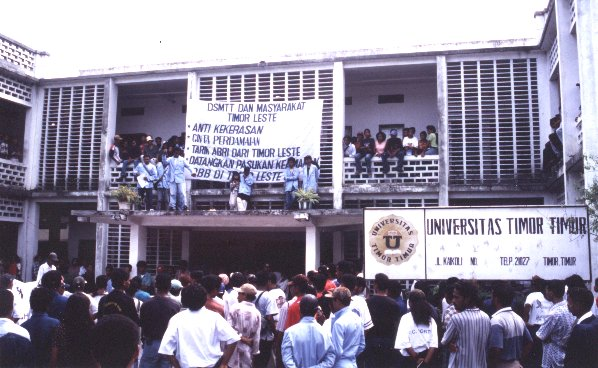
Protesters demonstrating at the National University of East Timor in November 1998, following calls to follow up the 1998 riots.

Suharto's grip on the East Timorese and Indonesian populace waned over time as the 1997 Asian financial crisis devastated the Indonesian economy. As the momentum of the student-led movement grew, so did the frequency and scale of protests and acts of civil disobedience. Demonstrations, strikes, and other forms of protest became a common occurrence, particularly on university campuses. University campuses in Indonesia provided a space for critical thinking, discussion, and organization. The students' courage and determination in the face of harsh government crackdowns inspired others to join the resistance movement. East Timorese students, both within East Timor and studying abroad, began to form student organizations and engage in clandestine activities to counter the oppressive regime. One of the earliest and most influential student organizations was the National Resistance of East Timorese Students (RENETIL), founded in Jakarta in the mid-1980s. RENETIL served as a platform for East Timorese students to exchange ideas, discuss strategies, and coordinate actions against the Indonesian government's policies. It also played a crucial role in raising international awareness about the situation in East Timor.

One of the most significant incidents was the Santa Cruz massacre in 1991, where Indonesian security forces brutally suppressed a peaceful demonstration in Dili, East Timor's capital. This led RENETIL to organize its first demonstration in Jakarta a week later. Future East Timorese politician, Fernando de Araújo, was among the 72 students leading the protest. While the protest led to his and other students' arrest on November 24 and their subsequent charge with subversion, resulting in nine years of imprisonment, RENETIL persisted. RENETIL, now isolated, attempted to "Indonize" the East Timor conflict by promoting the issue and establishing contact with Indonesian opposition groups fighting against the Suharto regime. From here, joint Indonesian-East Timorese Student Organizations sprung up across campuses such like the People's Democratic Union (PRD) and the Student Solidarity for Democracy (SMID). RENETIL also created the Indonesian People's Solidarity with the Maubere People (SPRIM) and also began to infiltrate the East Timor Association of University and High School Students (Indonesian: Ikatan Mahasiswa dan Pelajar Timor Timur (IMPETTU or IMPETU)), the state sponsored Indonesian-East Timorese student organization. The Indonesian military and the Indonesian governor of East Timor, José Abílio Osório Soares, then began to veto candidates they did not like. Eventually by gradual reform, IMPETTU was fully without government oversight. By 1996, IMPETTU was formerly led by future East Timorese Deputy Prime Minister and former RENETIL member, Mariano Sabino Lopes.

With connections from East Timor, copies of the Santa Cruz massacre footage were distributed and circulated within Indonesia, granting more Indonesian citizens access to uncensored depictions of their government's actions. As a result, numerous other pro-democracy student factions and their publications within Indonesia began openly and critically addressing not only East Timor, but also the "New Order" regime, as well as the broader history and future of Indonesia.

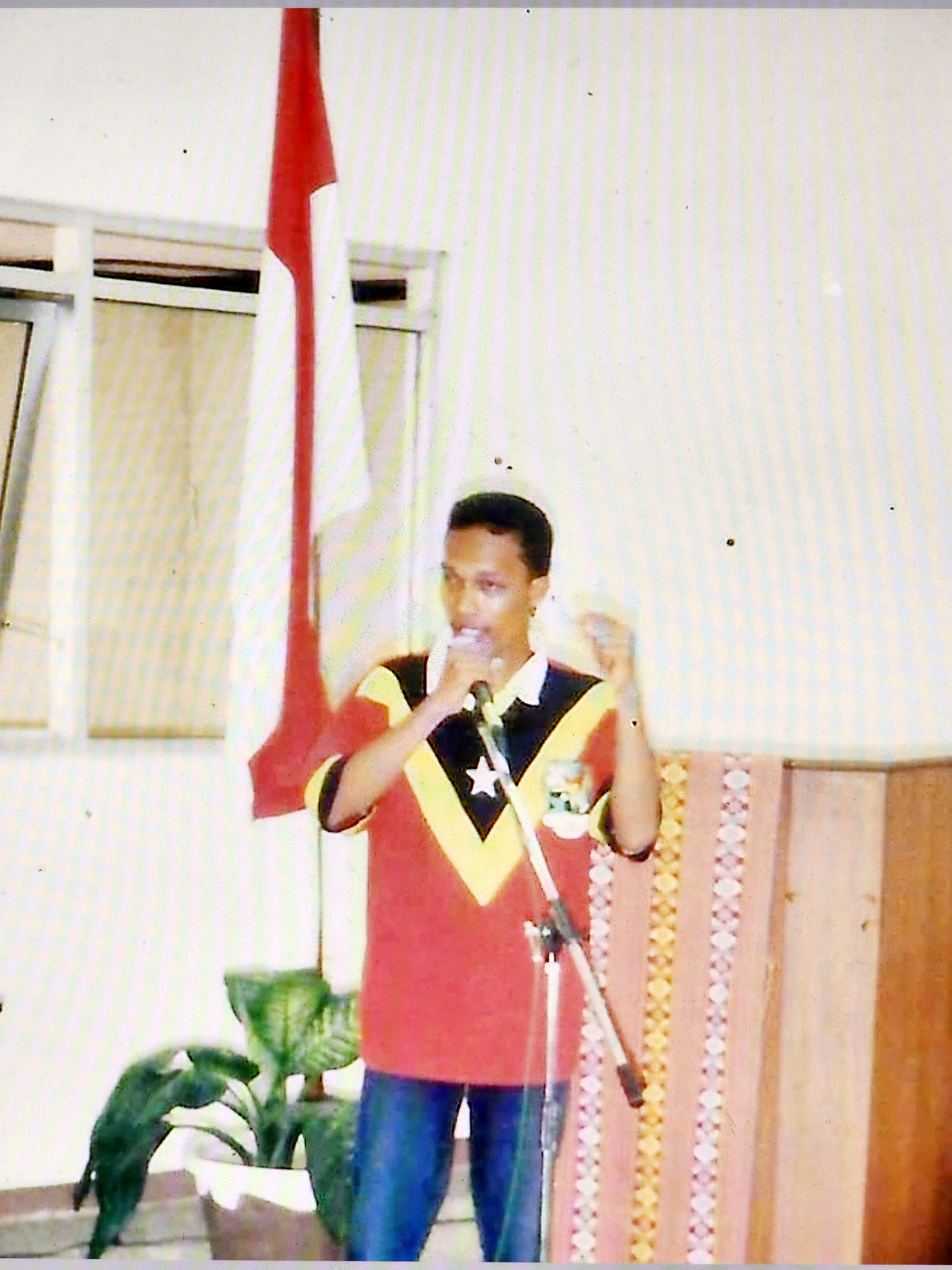
RENETIL member Abel Pires da Silva wearing East Timor's flag during a public speech in Indonesia in 1997 to demand the right for self-determination

The 1991 Santa Cruz massacre led to a rethink within the Indonesian democracy movement on the East Timor issue. From here, East Timorese Pro-independence students usually found common ground with Indonesian Pro-democracy students. Eventually, both factions can be found in solidarity, participating in protests across Indonesia and often intermingle when organizing against the Suharto regime. Thus East Timorese students became a backbone to Indonesia's path to democracy and East Timor's Independence. On the other hand, the democracy movement itself was driven by the East Timorese students. East Timorese students were often formed and known as the heart of the groups and also promoted a more militant line of the protests. While Indonesians protested mostly peacefully at demonstrations, the East Timorese threw stones and burned pictures of President Suharto, affecting the military's response to the demonstrations and the movement.

Such cooperation was notably evident during the 1995 embassy occupations in Jakarta, where students from RENETIL, IMPETTU, and the underground Timorese Socialist Association (AST) were joined by Indonesian pro-democracy activists and students from various campuses across Jakarta. They came together with the common goal of demonstrating and occupying several embassies throughout Jakarta, primarily focusing on the Dutch and Russian embassies. This also occurred in conjunction with both the summit meeting of the Asia-Pacific Economic Co-operation where president Bill Clinton was visiting. With the help of Indonesian activists, some twenty-nine East Timorese students climbed over the wall of the American embassy in Jakarta on November 12, as the APEC meeting began, and proceeded to occupy the grounds for the next twelve days. President Bill Clinton, without acknowledging the goals of the protests, stated that they were peaceful. In light to save face, the Indonesian government assured the delegation that the protestors weren't going to be prosecuted. After the arrest, the protesters were deported and received asylum in Portugal. Some East Timorese students who also occupied and jumped over the fences of various embassies were also deported to Portugal.

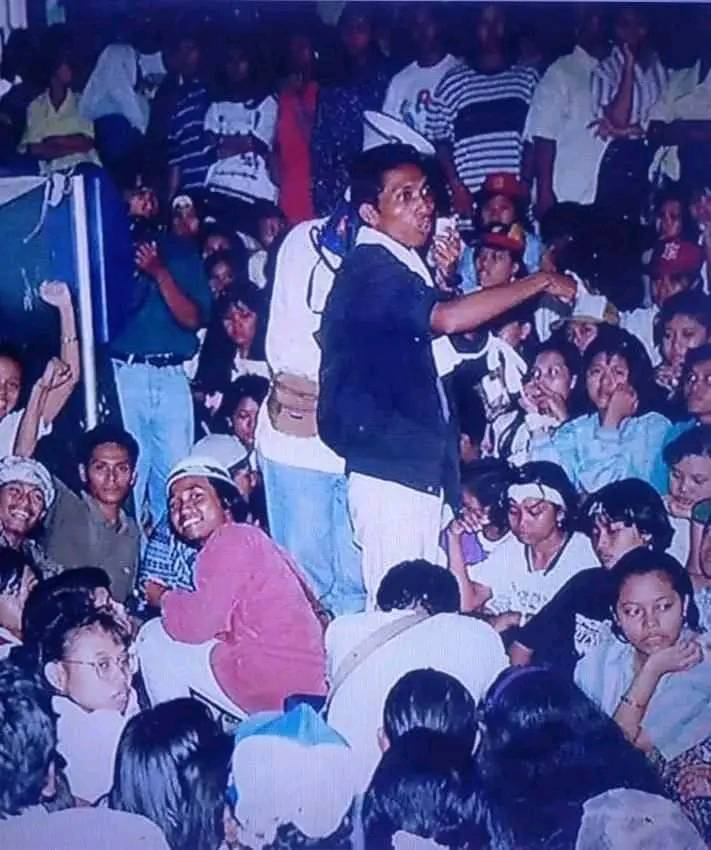
Safi'i Kemamang protesting for the independence of Timor-Leste alongside Indonesian Pro-democracy students, 1998.

It was during this period that the well-known Indonesian protest anthem “Buruh Tani,” originally titled “Lagu Pembebasan” (“Song of Liberation”), was composed in 1996 in Surabaya. Widely associated with left-wing labor and student movements, the song is attributed to Safi'i Kemamang, an East Timorese composer and member of the People's Democratic Party (PRD). Kemamang reportedly composed the piece after observing the need for a unifying anthem among diverse groups opposing the New Order regime. With lyrics that express solidarity among laborers, farmers, students, and the urban poor, the song came to represent broader struggles against social inequality and authoritarian governance. Over time, “Buruh Tani” gained symbolic resonance among various activist circles, particularly during today's Post-Suharto era and in student-led demonstrations in Indonesia.

Another was on 4 April 1998, where thousands of students demanded that the president's 32-year rule end and that economic and political reforms be implemented during the anti-Suharto demonstrations at the University of Gajah Mada in Yogyakarta, Indonesia's oldest campus and Suharto's hometown. The students (mostly Indonesians) bear flags of East Timor and Indonesia with bloodied make up to reenact East Timorese suffering. Indonesian students then clashed with hundreds of riot police, during which the police used tear gas and students threw rocks. During the months of July and August 1998, student activists focused on organizing more free-speech forums so that East Timorese could discuss what kind of independence they desired and how to achieve it. The newly formed Student Solidarity Council (In indonesian: Dewan Solidaritas Mahasiswa) avoided affiliation with any political party and welcomed all perspectives both originating from Indonesia and East Timor. Dili hosted the largest forum on August 22. For the first time in history, Indonesian activists and intellectuals (most notably, Wilson Obrigados, Yeni Rosa Damayanti, and Father Y. B. Mangunwijaya) gave speeches inside East Timor condemning the occupation and advocating for a referendum and democracy.

=== Habibie and the referendum ===
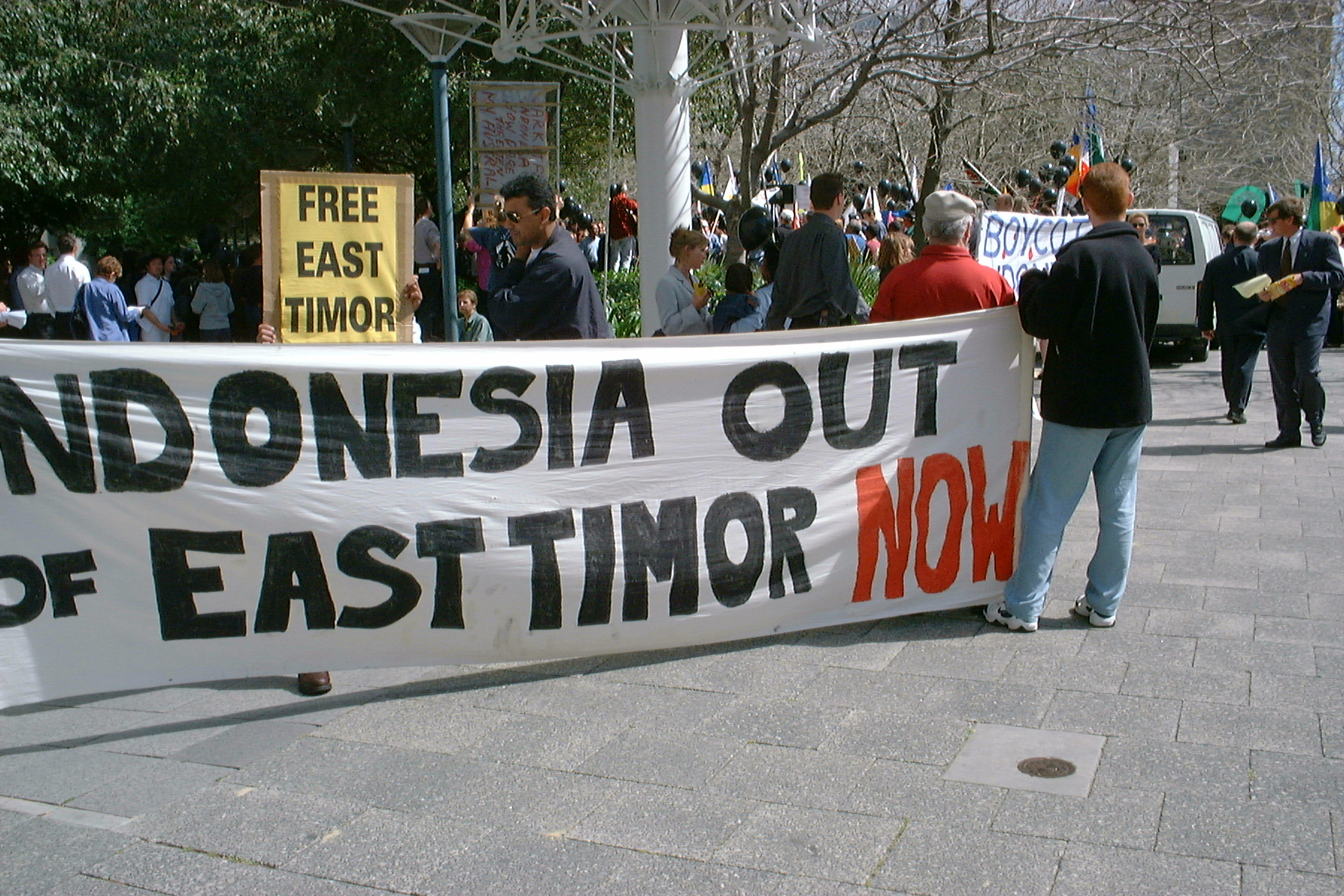
International demonstration supporting the results of East Timor's referendum in September 1999, at a time when Indonesian troops were carrying out a scorched earth campaign in the country

Following Suharto's forced resignation in 1998, his vice president, BJ Habibie, succeeded him in presidency. During his short 1 year presidency, he lifted restrictions on political parties and labour unions; ended censorship; freed Xanana Gusmão, the East Timor independence leader, from prison; signed a new agreement with the International Monetary Fund to stabilise the economy; and promised democratic elections.

Habibie was concerned by the fact that during visits, foreign politicians repeatedly deviated from topics and spoke about East Timor. Habibie has also long been offended by the costs of occupying East Timor and developing it. Eventually as international pressure for East Timor's independence grew, Habibie promised to take light to the East Timor issue. Unexpectedly, he offered a surprise referendum on East Timorese independence rather than a gradual reform to autonomy. Although he lightly disagreed on independence for East Timor, Habibie insisted on creating a referendum with a choice between special autonomy and independence.

Parts of the influential Indonesian military were strongly opposed to the East Timorese independence and had spent much of 1998 and 1999 arming pro-Indonesia partisans and arranging attacks on independence groups. There were repeated warnings, especially from the ranks of the Indonesian military, that there were efforts to unite the island of Timor in a state independent of Indonesia. However, there were never any serious politicians or groups in East Timor who aspired to such a Greater Timor. Also, the cultural differences and ethnic compositions in the two parts of the island, which has been divided for 400 years, are very different. Within hours of the referendum results being announced by UN Special Envoy to East Timor Jamsheed Marker, the Indonesian military ruled by General Wiranto enacted a Scorched Earth Operation in the territory, destroying over half of the territory's fixed infrastructure, killing about 1,500 East Timorese and displacing a further 300,000 people over the next few weeks. Habibie was unable to get the military to toe his line, and the accusations from their ranks that Habibie was endangering the unity of the country did the rest. Violence continued until an Australian-led UN peace-keeping force arrived in the country on 20 September 1999.

After 78% of East Timorese chose independence in the referendum, Habibie was attacked across the Indonesian political spectrum for betraying national interests. When Habibie was one of the candidates in the presidential nomination and election by the MPR in 1999, his nomination was opposed by most members of the People's Representative Council. He was opposed by the reformists due to being considered to still be part of the New Order regime. While his party, Golkar, and the opposition blamed him for the fallout of East Timor. This condition also caused Habibie's accountability report as president to be rejected at the 1999 MPR General Assembly. Because of this rejection, Habibie lost what little chance he had of retaining the presidency in Indonesia's October 1999 election. Meanwhile, the failure of the Indonesian military's plan to keep East Timor in the republic through chaos and to bring General Wiranto to the presidency of Indonesia has weakened, though not ended, the military's strong influence within the country's government. Nevertheless, due to the weakening of the military, Indonesia is now considered more democratic and stable than it would have been if it had come under Wiranto's autonomous military in 1999. After 512 days since office, Habibie was replaced by Abdurrahman Wahid, one of the first few figures within the New Order government to support the idea of a referendum for East Timor. With Wahid himself becoming the first president to daringly and openly acknowledge the atrocities committed by Indonesia against the people and country of Timor-Leste under the previous regime, issuing a public apology during a tumultuous time in Indonesia, amidst an uncertain divided government.

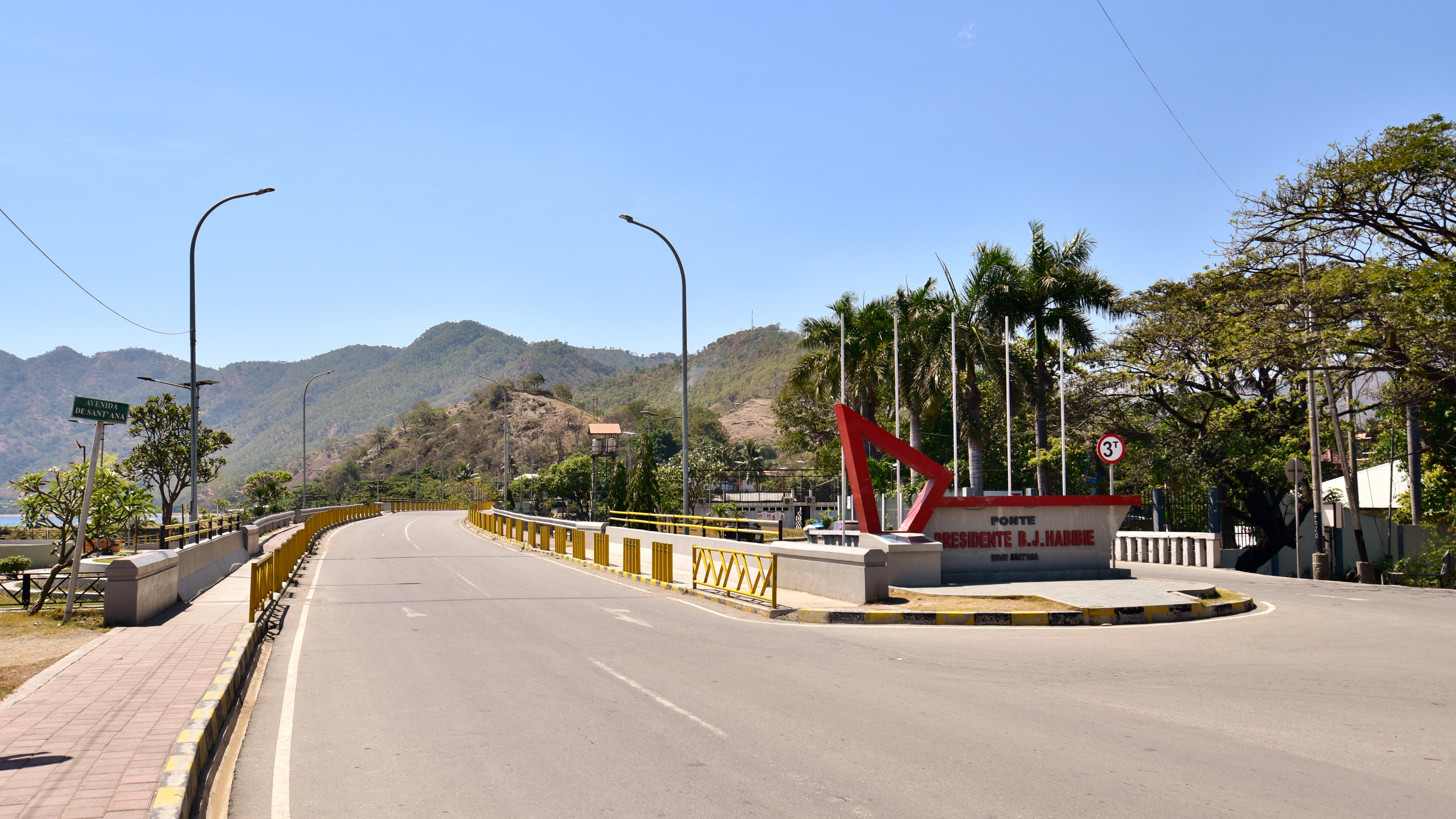
President B. J. Habibie Bridge and its entrance monument

The view of the Habibie's government in the early reform era tended to be negative, but in line with the development of time, many assessed the Habibie government positively, especially in Timor-Leste. The people of Timor-Leste hold a high regard for the late President of Indonesia. Regarded as a key figure in Timor-Leste's history, Habibie's decision to conduct the pivotal referendum in 1999 is considered instrumental in the establishment of the nation. This sentiment is shared by individuals from different generations, including those who experienced the independence referendum firsthand and the younger generation, who learn about Habibie through historical accounts. In recognition of his impact, a bridge situated in Dili was named in honor of Habibie. Though, it generated some criticism as Habibie's internal role is viewed very ambivalently, but Gusmão remained firm in relation to the name. Inaugurated on August 29, 2019, a few days before Habibie's passing, the bridge stands as a tangible representation of his lasting influence on the nation.

Prior to his passing, a viral video widely shared in Indonesia and Timor-Leste captured former President Xanana Gusmão visiting Habibie in the hospital. The footage shows an emotional Gusmão speaking quietly to Habibie before kissing him on the forehead. In a touching moment, Habibie reaches out and embraces Gusmão, who then lays his head on Habibie's chest. In Indonesia, this was seen as a powerful symbol of reconciliation and mutual respect. After hearing news of Habibie's death, Gusmão sent a floral tribute saying "Timorese people will remember you forever". The East Timorese government followed suit and offered heartfelt condolences. After his funeral procession, many students and residences of East Timorese origin residing in Indonesia visited his grave, paying their respects. Gusmão travelled from Timor-Leste to visit Habibie's grave at the Kalibata Heroes' Cemetery in South Jakarta to pay his last respects along with Habibie's son.

As in the years after independence, Timor-Leste's government was careful not to endanger Habibie's reforms and democratic successors through a reconciliation process.

=== Reparations and reconciliation ===
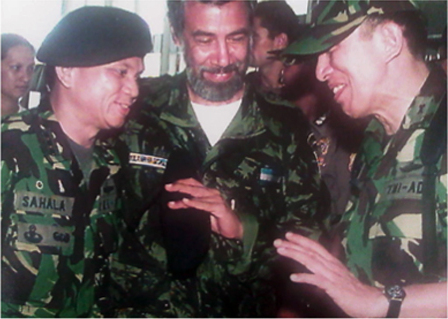
Last meeting on 30 Oct 1999 between Col Inf Sahala Silalahi, Xanana, and Colonel Czi J. Suryo Prabowo. The next day the TNI left East Timor on friendly terms

Only the deployment of an International Intervention Force (INTERFET) restored peace and order. After three years of UN administration, East Timor regained its independence on 20 May 2002. Since then, East Timorese leaders have primarily sought reconciliation with Indonesia rather than prosecution. At the time, large sections of the East Timorese population, human rights organisations and the Catholic Church all criticise this decision. The work of the Joint Truth and Friendship Commission (CTF) in coming to terms with the crimes of 1999 was also criticised in this respect. The Reception, Truth and Reconciliation Commission of East Timor (CAVR), established by the United Nations, tried instead to document the perpetrators of the crimes between 1975 and 1999. The Serious Crimes Unit set up by the UN investigated East Timor for this purpose. However, because the governments in Jakarta and Dili did not want to cooperate with the court, or did not want to strain relations between the two sides, Indonesian officials and military personnel were not brought to justice. During the riots in Timor-Leste in 2006, the office of the SCU was vandalised and important evidence against Indonesian defendants was destroyed. Several thousand East Timorese, mainly collaborators and their families, fled to West Timor after the Indonesians withdrew and now live there, sometimes in very poor conditions. The SCU's office in Dili was destroyed.

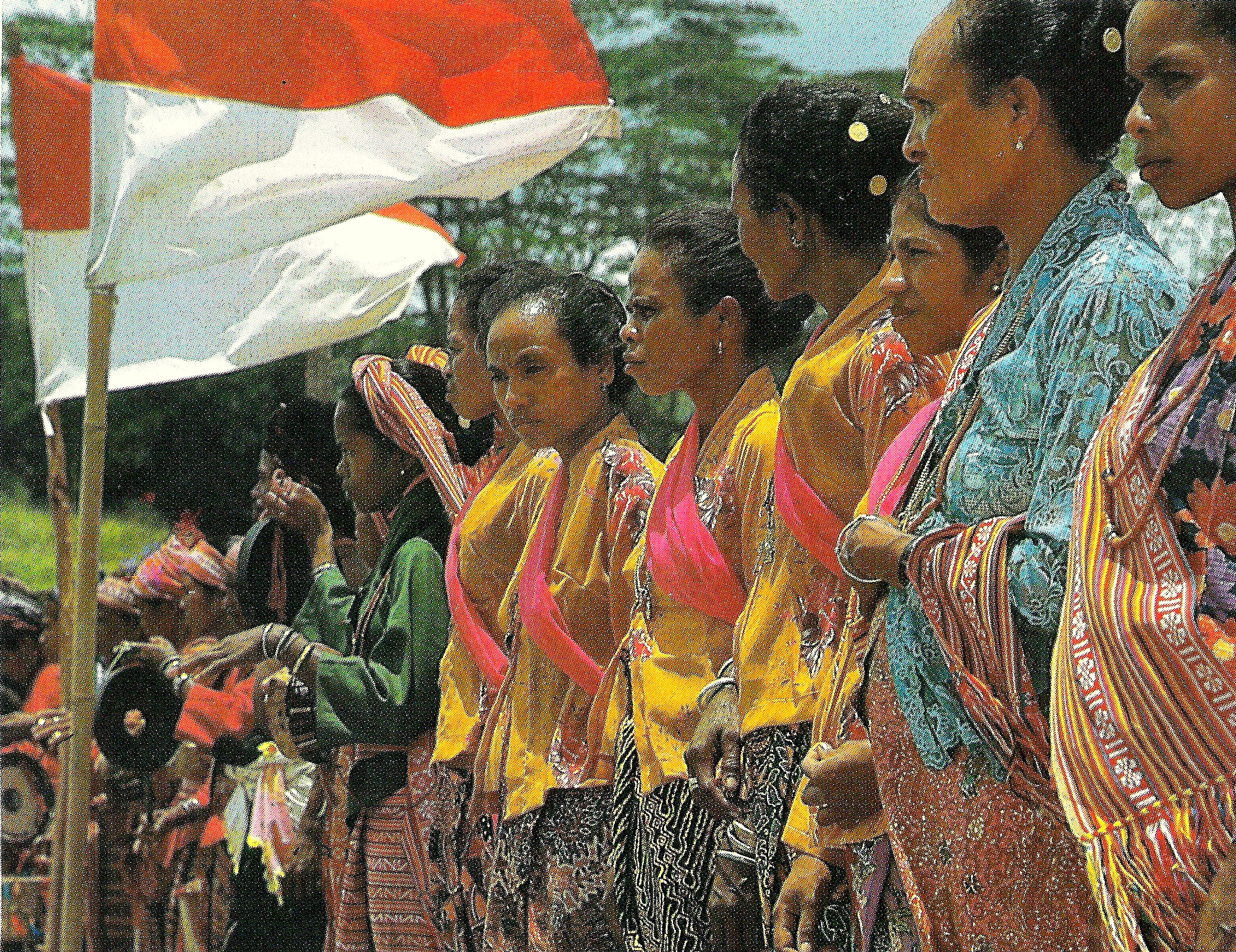
East Timorese women in an Indonesian propaganda image (1984)

About 4,000 children were brought from East Timor by Indonesian soldiers, officials and religious organisations during the 24 years of occupation - mostly to help them, often promises of a good education for the children were made to the parents. Other children were kept like slaves by the soldiers who had killed their parents or taken them away from them. According to a secret military document, Indonesian soldiers were supposed to help transfer children to Indonesia to spread Islam in East Timor. Many children were sent to Muslim schools (Pesanten) and forcibly converted. The deportation was never official state policy, but within a year of the invasion, President Suharto had taken 23 East Timorese children into his residence in Jakarta. They became an East Timorese branch of the Suharto family. Since a large number were only two or three years old, it is difficult to find their families in Timor-Leste today. Numerous children have also simply disappeared.

The United Nations Transitional Administration in East Timor (UNTAET) provided an interim civil administration and a peacekeeping mission in the territory of East Timor, from its establishment in October 1999 until the territory's independence on 20 May 2002.

== Bilateral relations ==
=== Border dispute ===
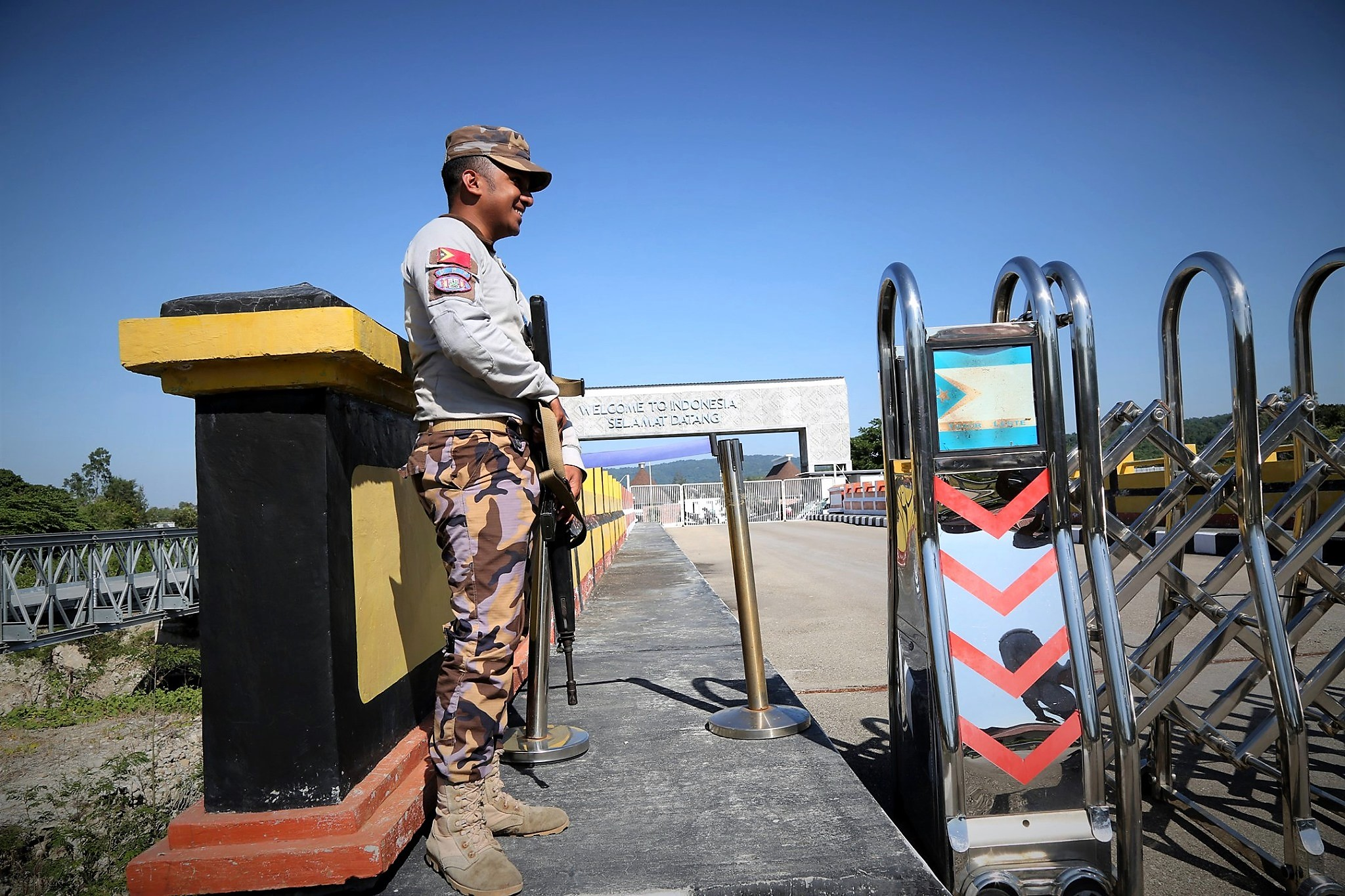
East Timorese border guard standing on a crossing in Motamasin

Problems to be solved include, East Timor-Indonesia Boundary Committee meetings to survey and delimit land boundary; and Indonesia is seeking resolution of East Timorese refugees in Indonesia. Initially disputed with Indonesia were the affiliation of the small uninhabited island of Batek Island (Fatu Sinai), 37 hectares between Memo (Suco Tapo/Memo) and the Indonesian Dilumil (Belu Regency) and areas around the exclave of Oe-Cusse Ambeno (Área Cruz in Passabe, Citrana triangle in Nitibe) as well as the exact modalities of a corridor from Oe-Cusse Ambeno to the main national territory. Since 2010, there has been a special pass for traffic in the area near the border. Since the end of 2009, however, there have been repeated incursions by Indonesian soldiers on the local population in Naktuka.

In 2013, the dispute over the Memo area was settled. Timor-Leste had already given up its claims to the island of Batek Island at that time. On 23 July 2019, after a meeting between Timor-Leste's chief negotiator Xanana Gusmão and Wiranto, Indonesia's Coordinating Minister for Political Affairs, Law and Security, it was declared that agreement had now been reached on the course of the country's border. Negotiations on the maritime demarcation have also been underway since 2015.

On 25 August 2025, an Indonesian villager was injured by East-Timorese border patrol officers in Inbate village in the North Central Timor Regency. Reports stated that the altercation began when residents of the village claimed that East Timorese construction workers "encroached" on their farmland while building border barriers in the village.

=== ASEAN ===
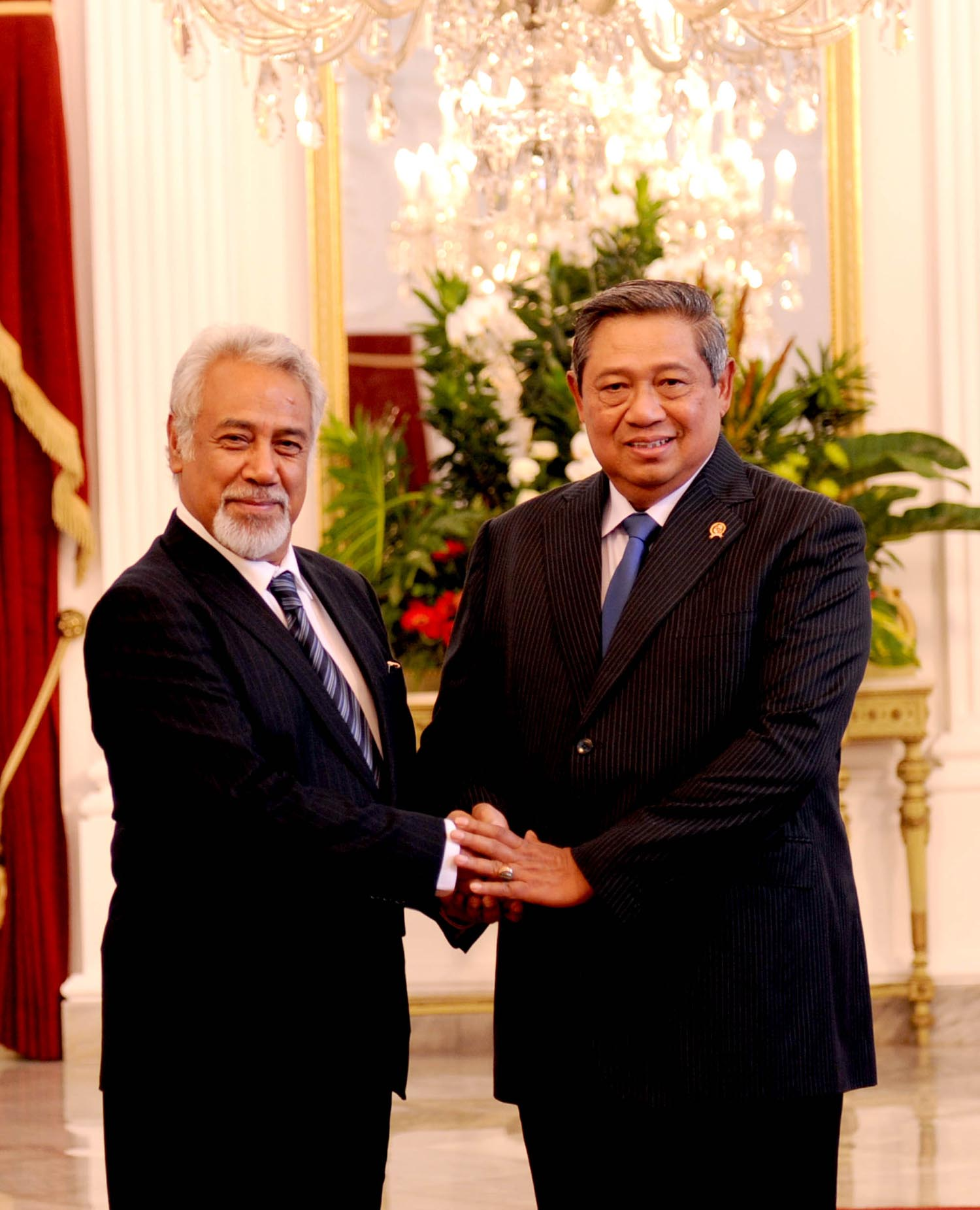
President Susilo Bambang Yudhoyono and Xanana Gusmão at the Merdeka Palace

Following the succession of Timor-Leste from Indonesia, the state was recognized as an ASEAN observer. Indonesia has been a strong supporter of Timor-Leste's accession into ASEAN, especially during the chairmanship of Susilo Bambang Yudhoyono in 2011. Indonesia has pushed and insisted other members of ASEAN grant Timor-Leste ASEAN membership. This caused disagreement with other ASEAN countries, such as Singapore and Laos, which objected on the grounds that Timor-Leste is not yet developed enough to join. In October 2025, Timor-Leste joined ASEAN as the 11th member state of the organization.

=== Economy ===
Indonesia is Timor-Leste's largest and most important import partner, with the former exporting US$187 million (32%-33.3% of imports) worth of goods in 2017 while the latter only exported US$6 million in the opposite direction. In 2018, Timor-Leste imported goods worth US$159,380,000 from Indonesia (2016: US$158,594,000), including vehicles, fuel, food, cigarettes and construction materials. Conversely, Timor-Leste exported goods worth US$3,152,000 to Indonesia (3rd in destination, 2016: US$453,000). Of this, US$2,020,561 worth was 2,744,080 kg of coffee. Indonesia is thus the 4th importer of East Timorese coffee. In addition, there are re-exports from Timor-Leste to Indonesia worth 5,243,000 US dollars (3rd place).

From Presidente Nicolau Lobato Airport in Dili, there are connections to Kupang, Denpasar, and Jakarta. From the heartland of Timor-Leste, there is a border crossing at Mota'ain, near the north coast, and at Motamasin, on the south coast towards Indonesian West Timor. There is no regular bus service. From the East Timorese exclave of Oe-Cusse Ambeno, border crossings at Napan/Bobometo, Sacato/Wini and Passabe lead to West Timor. However, only Bobometo and Sacato are legal crossings.

Traditionally, there was a lively trade between Timor-Leste's Tutuala and Indonesia's Leti Islands, including batik sarongs. Since Timor-Leste's independence in 2002, trade across national borders has declined.

=== Culture ===
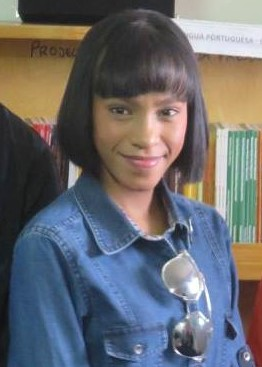
Maria Vitória (2017)

Indonesian language is considered a working language in Timor-Leste. As a result of the occupation, 36.6% of Timor-Leste's population can still speak, read and write Indonesian, another 1.7% speak and read, 17.6% only able to read, and 6.2% only able speak it. About 2,700 inhabitants of Timor-Leste consider Indonesian as their mother tongue.

In 2011, 5,501 citizens of Indonesia live in Timor-Leste. There is a very large number of East Timorese in Indonesia, whether as Foreign workers or as students.

Dangdut, an Indonesian form of hit song, enjoys great popularity in Timor-Leste. In the second season of the Indonesian singing casting show D'Academy Asia (end of 2016), in which contestants from several Southeast Asian countries took part and sang dangdut songs, East Timorese Maria Vitória (MarVi) came fourth behind three Indonesians. A fan of dangdut, Prime Minister Xanana Gusmao was also seen dancing enthusiastically to the rhythm of songs, such as 'Kaka Main Salah', followed by two dangdut songs performed by Aurelie Moeremans, 'Cikini Gondangdia' and 'No Comment,' during the 2023 ASEAN Summit in Jakarta.

Indonesian cuisine is still relatively common and eaten across Timor-Leste, commonly found in family-run restaurants (Warung). Elements of indonesian foods and drinks can also be found in East Timorese cuisine, such like Katupa (Ketupat in Indonesian), Bibingka (Bingka in Indonesian), and many others.

== See also ==
- Foreign relations of Timor-Leste
- Foreign relations of Indonesia
- History of Timor-Leste
- History of Indonesia
- Indonesia–Timor-Leste border

== Footnotes ==
- a. "Shortly after midnight on April 25, 1974 young left-wing officers of the Movimento das Forcas Armadas (MFA) overthrew Portugals 48-year-old nationalist dictatorship... (it) came to be known as "the Carnation Revolution."" The Spirit of Democracy, p. 39, Larry Diamond, Macmillan 2008.
- b. "Fretilin was established by a seminary-trained mestizo elite with links to left-wing groups in both Portugal and its African colonies." Dictionary of the modern politics of South-East Asia, p. 115, Michael Leifer, Taylor & Francis, 2001.
