= Noémia Sequeira =

Politician from Timor-Leste

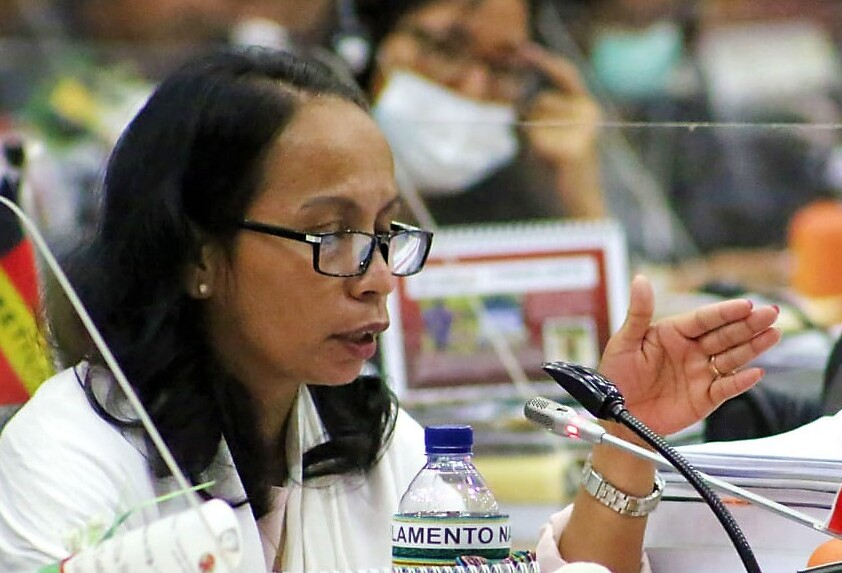
- Born: 27 April 1980 (age 46); Oecusse-Ambeno, Indonesia (now East Timor)
- Occupation: Member of National Parliament (Timor-Leste)
- Political party: Fretilin

Noémia Sequeira (born 27 April 1980 in Oe-Cusse Ambeno) is a politician from Timor-Leste. She has been a member of the Fretilin party. She stood in the 2017 parliamentary elections as a candidate on her party's list in position 24, but missed direct entry into the National Parliament. However, as other elected party representatives gave up their seats, Sequeira was eventually elected to parliament in 2017. She was appointed as a member of the Public Finance Commission, and a deputy member of the Parliament's Administrative Council. In the 2018 parliamentary elections, Sequeira again narrowly missed direct entry into parliament on the list position 24, but on 13 June she replaced Mari Alkatiri, who gave up his seat. Sequeira remained a member of the Public Finance Commission.
