= Berlin Nakroma =

Passenger ship built in 2007

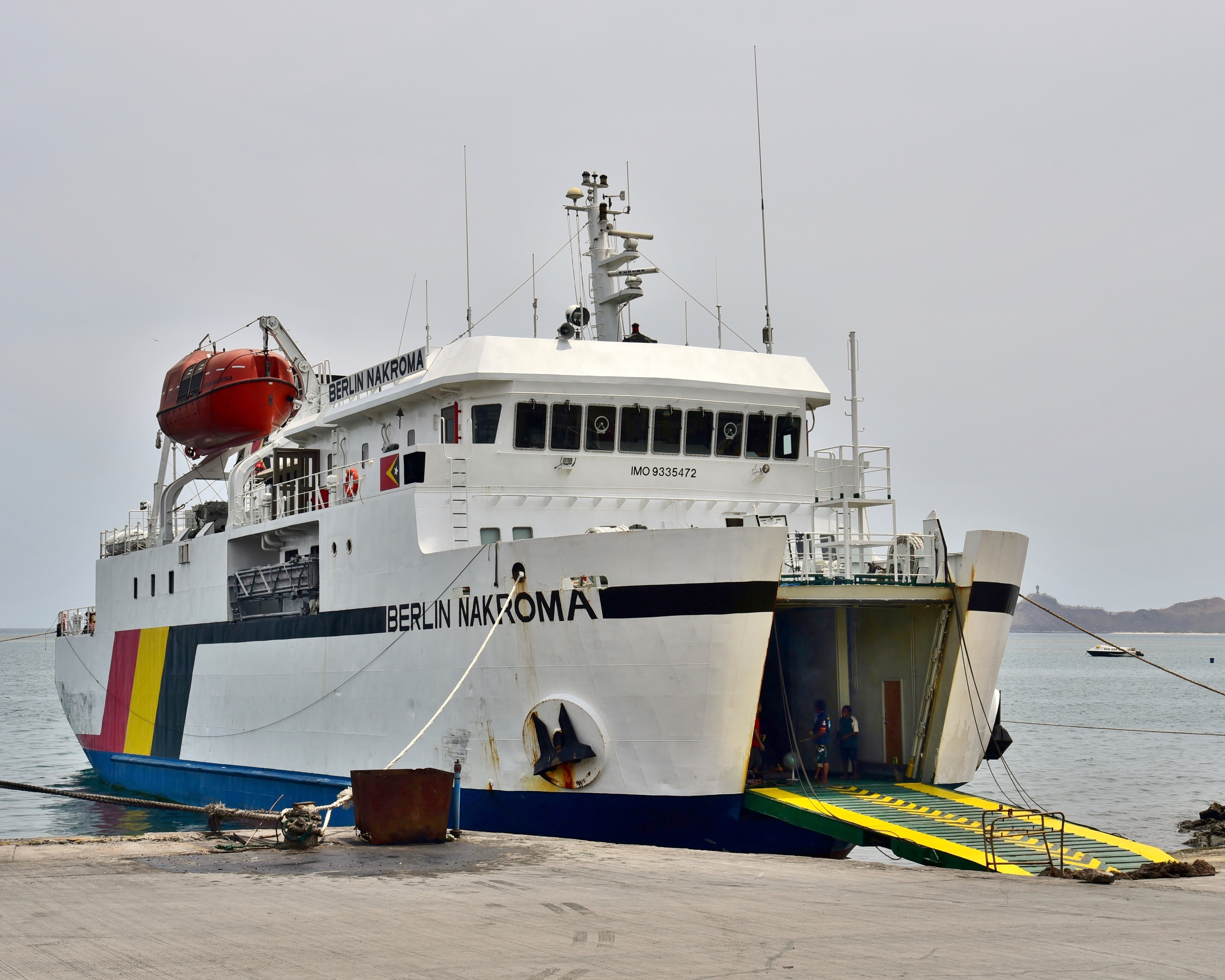
- Berlin Nakroma in Dili, October 2018

History
- Name: Nakroma (2007–2008); Berlin Nakroma (2008–)
- Operator: Government of East Timor
- Port of registry: Jakarta, Indonesia
- Builder: PT PAL, Surabaya
- Acquired: 2007
- Identification: IMO number: 9335472; MMSI number: 525015158; Callsign: 4WABN
- Status: In service

General characteristics
- Tonnage: 1,134 GT; 262 DWT
- Length: 47.25 m (155.0 ft)
- Beam: 12 m (39 ft)
- Capacity: 300 passengers; 110 t DWT cargo

Berlin Nakroma is a roll-on/roll-off passenger and cargo ferry owned and operated by the Government of East Timor since 2007. A gift to East Timor from the Federal Republic of Germany, she links Dili, capital city of East Timor, with Pante Macassar in the East Timorese exclave of Oecusse, and with Atauro Island.

== Concept and construction ==
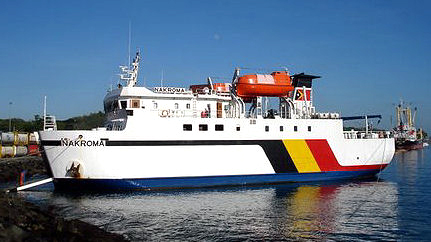
Nakroma in September 2007

The Democratic Republic of East Timor is made up of three main parts, being the eastern half of Timor, the exclave of Oecusse adjacent to the northwestern coast of Timor, and the island of Atauro. Passport-free transport between these three locations is possible only by sea.

In 2002, the German Federal Ministry for Economic Cooperation and Development (BMZ) commissioned a cooperation project to improve East Timorese living conditions by establishing a regular maritime passenger and goods transport connection between the three locations.

From 2003 to 2006, a passenger ferry was chartered to operate such a connection. During that period, around 3,400 passengers used the service each month. In February 2007, a new ferry commissioned by the BMZ and financed by KfW Development Bank, the Nakroma, was officially handed over to the East Timorese government to assume the operation of the service.

The donated ferry was built in Surabaya, Indonesia, by PT PAL. She is a roll-on/roll-off vessel 47.25 m (155.0 ft) long, and has a beam of 12 m (39 ft). Her tonnage is 1,134 gross tonnage (GT) and 262 tons deadweight (DWT). She can carry up to 300 passengers (20 in first class, 149 in second class forward, and 131 in second class aft), and up to 110 tonnes deadweight (DWT) of cargo.

In recognition of the success of the cooperation project, the ferry was renamed Berlin Nakroma.

== Service history ==
Berlin Nakroma operates regular ferry services linking Dili with Pante Macassar in Oecusse, and with Atauro, using landing facilities in Dili and Oecusse that were upgraded as part of the cooperation project.

The vessel flies an Indonesian flag with Jakarta as her port of registry, although an East Timorese ship registry was established in 2015 and was scheduled to be up and running by 2017.

In July 2017, it was announced that the German government had donated €7.5 million to the East Timor Ministry of Public Works, Transport and Communication (MOPTK), for the building of a Berlin Nakroma II. East Timor would be designing the new ship, while the funds from Germany would be used to build her.
