= Batek Island =

Island in Indonesia

Native name: Pulau Batek Fatu Sinai
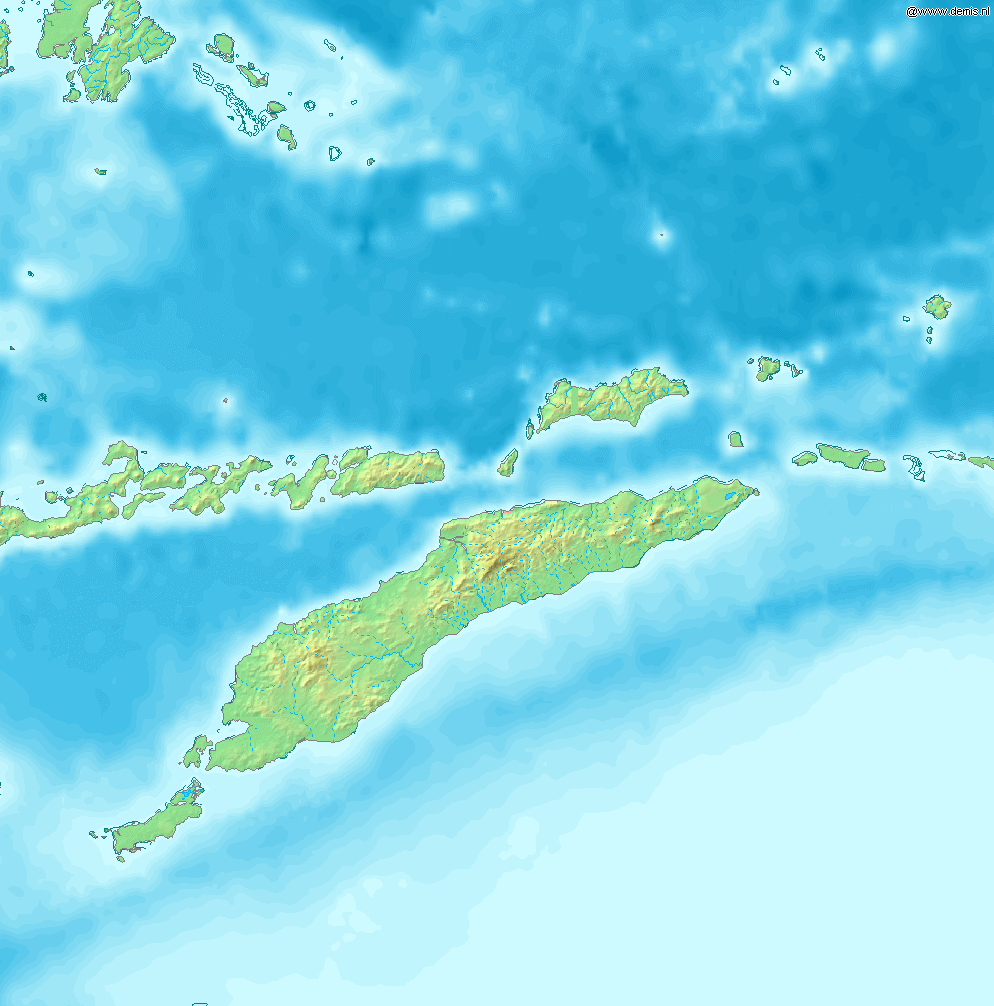
- Location within Timor

Geography
- Location: Savu Sea
- Coordinates: 9°15′24″S 123°59′35″E
- Area: 0.135 sq mi (0.35 km^{2})
- Length: 500 m (1600 ft)
- Width: 320 m (1050 ft)
- Highest elevation: 50 m (160 ft)

Administration
- Indonesia
- Province: East Nusa Tenggara
- Regency: Kupang Regency
- District: East Amfoang

Batek Island (Indonesian: Pulau Batek) or Fatu Sinai is a small island located in East Nusa Tenggara Province (NTT), Indonesia. This island located in the Savu Sea, northwest of the island of Timor, 9.3 km (5.8 mi) off the East Timorese municipality of Oecusse.

== Etymology ==
The island is uninhabited, but is traditionally considered sacred by the local population on both sides of the border, even though the majority are now Christians. It is therefore referred to as Fatu Lulik (sacred mountain) or adat. Legend has it that the island came to its present position from Timor's interior. While the inhabitants of Nitibe see its origin in the East Timorese Oesilo, the people from East Amfoang assign the island's origin to the Indonesian Mount Mutis, the highest mountain in West Timor. The legends are similar because despite the border dating back to colonial times, the inhabitants of the region on both sides of the border belong to the Atoin Meto ethnic group.

== History ==
=== Colonial period ===
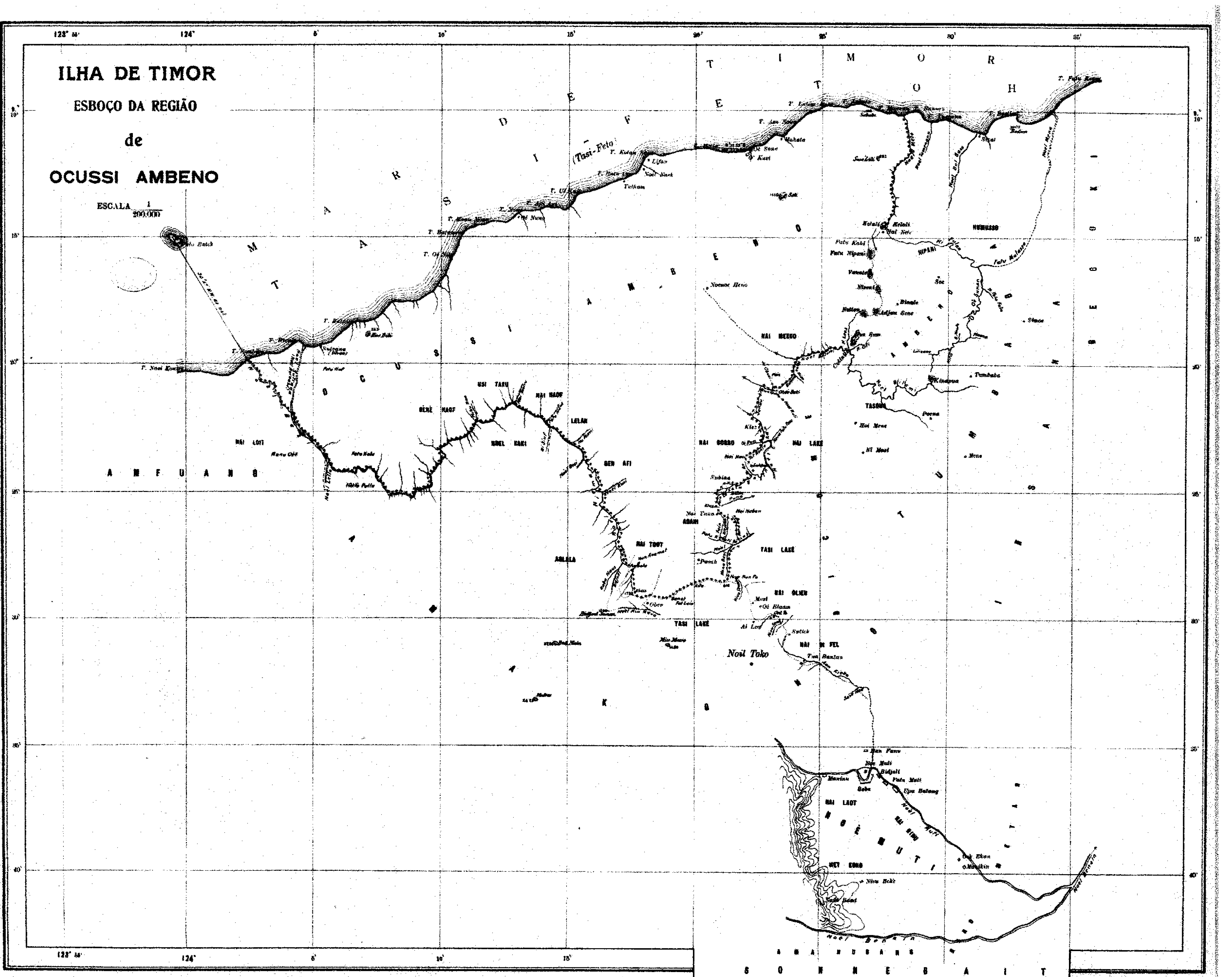
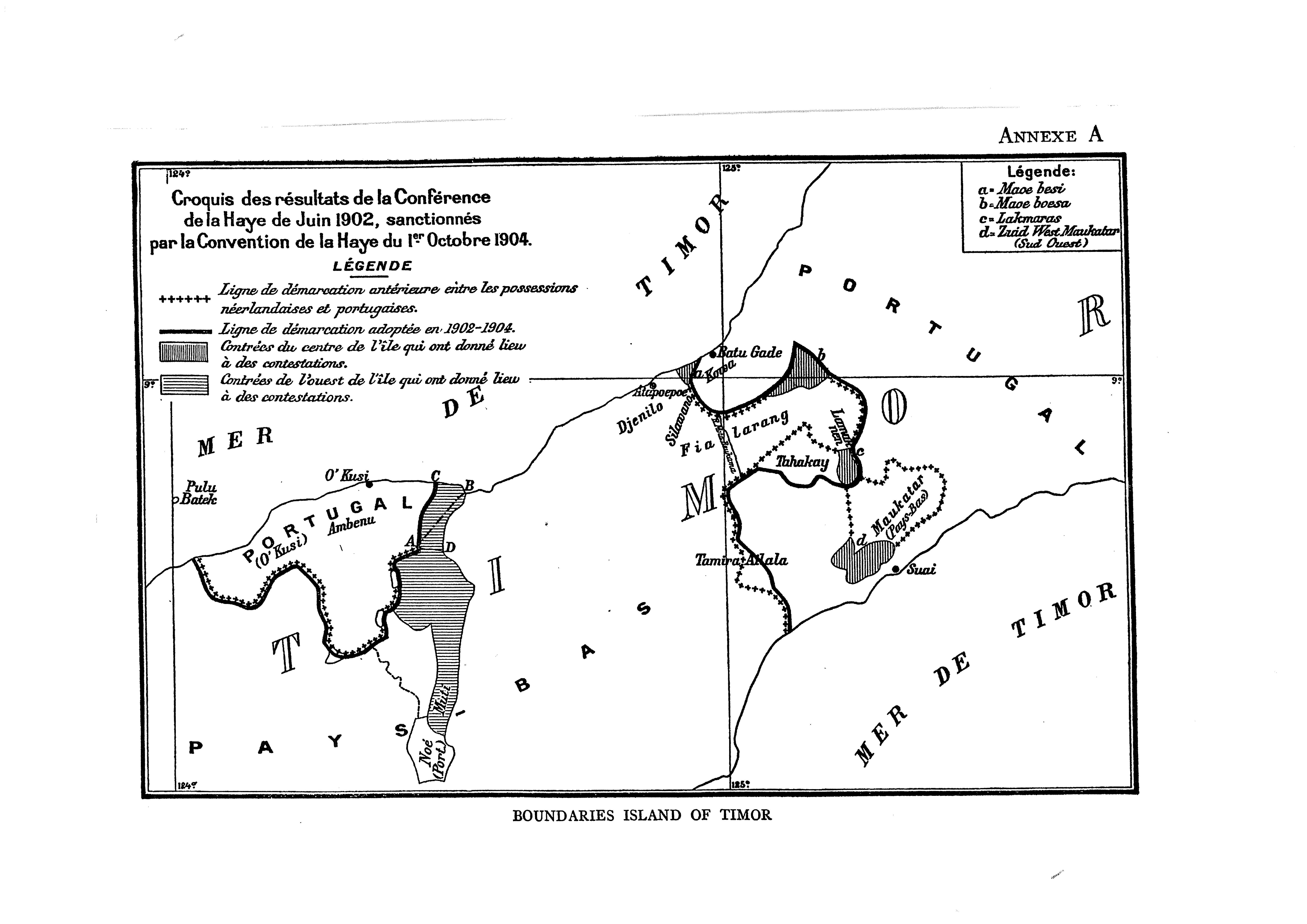
The 1914 map on the left is based on the 1899 settlement, which is the basis for East Timor's claim to Batek Island. The right map of the Permanent Court of Arbitration's award of 25 June 1914 on the boundaries of Timor does not provide clarity on the island called Pulu Batek here.

The border treaties between Portugal and the Netherlands in 1859, 1896, 1904 and 1914 established the border between the two colonial powers' dominions on the island of Timor. Out of the four treaties, only the 1904 treaty mentions the island as Pulau Batek, where it is divided between Portuguese (Portuguese Timor) and the Dutch (Dutch East Indies). Later, Batek Island was a "forgotten island" that the colonial powers did not care about any further. After the Indonesian invasion of East Timor in 1975, the island was solely under Indonesian administration.

=== Dispute ===
Timor-Leste is claiming the island, using a map of 1914 as reference. In 2004, Indonesian Colonel Moesanip said that this claim was abandoned when the East Timorese Minister of Foreign Affairs, José Ramos-Horta, recognized Indonesian sovereignty over the island. The Batek Island dispute between Indonesia and East Timor has largely been ended in 2005. However, East Timorese chief negotiator Xanana Gusmão indicated in 2022 that negotiations were continuing.

After the 1999 independence referendum, in which Timor-Leste opted for a state independent of Indonesia and later placed under UN administration, Batek Island became a point of contention. In the first drafts of the Constitutional Commission of Oecussi Enclave, Batek Island was defined as part of Oe-Cusse Ambeno and thus as part of East Timorese territory, based on several consultations with the communities. However, the Constitution of Timor-Leste did not list Batek Island as part of the national territory.

In the second half of 2002, Indonesia built a small lighthouse on Batek Island. On 14 December 2003, the Indonesian military conducted a military exercise in which a warship, helicopters and jet fighters used the island for several hours as part of the exercise. The inhabitants of Citrana, on the coast of Nitibe, felt threatened by this, especially as Timor-Leste had not been informed of the manoeuvre beforehand. Publicly, the East Timorese government and the United Nations were reluctant to comment, and it was not until 12 January 2004 that the Australian press reported on the incident. On 16 January, Timor-Leste has sent a memorandum of objection to Indonesia regarding the conduct of war exercises around Batek Island. On 5 February, Indonesian Colonel Moesanip, KOREM commander of Kupang, stated that the manoeuvre was to demonstrate Indonesian sovereignty over Batek Island and that if Timor-Leste resisted, Indonesia would station soldiers on the island.

On 2 March 2017, President Joko Widodo designated Batek Island as part of Indonesia's 111 outermost small islands. This designation status is stated in Presidential Decree No. 6/2017 on the Designation of Outermost Small Islands.

== Geography ==
Batek Island is a small island located in East Amfoang District, Kupang Regency, East Nusa Tenggara (NTT). This island is located near the border between Indonesia and Timor Leste, right in the Savu Sea. Geographically, Batek Island has a relatively small area and is surrounded by the vast waters of the Savu Sea.

This island has unique natural characteristics with a coast filled with coral rocks and dense coastal vegetation. This area tends to have a dry tropical climate, which is a common characteristic in the Nusa Tenggara region (Lesser Sunda Islands), with varying rainfall and a longer dry season than the rainy season.

Administratively, Batek Island is included in the East Amfoang district, which is one of the districts in Kupang Regency. East Amfoang district itself mostly consists of coastal areas that directly border Timor Leste. Access to the island is relatively difficult due to its remote location, and most of the population living in this area depend on fishing and subsistence farming for their livelihoods.

Batek Island also has strategic value due to its location near the border, so it is often a concern in the context of monitoring the border area between Indonesia and Timor Leste.
