= Nitibe =

Town in Oecusse, Timor-Leste

Coordinates: 9°21′S 124°14′E

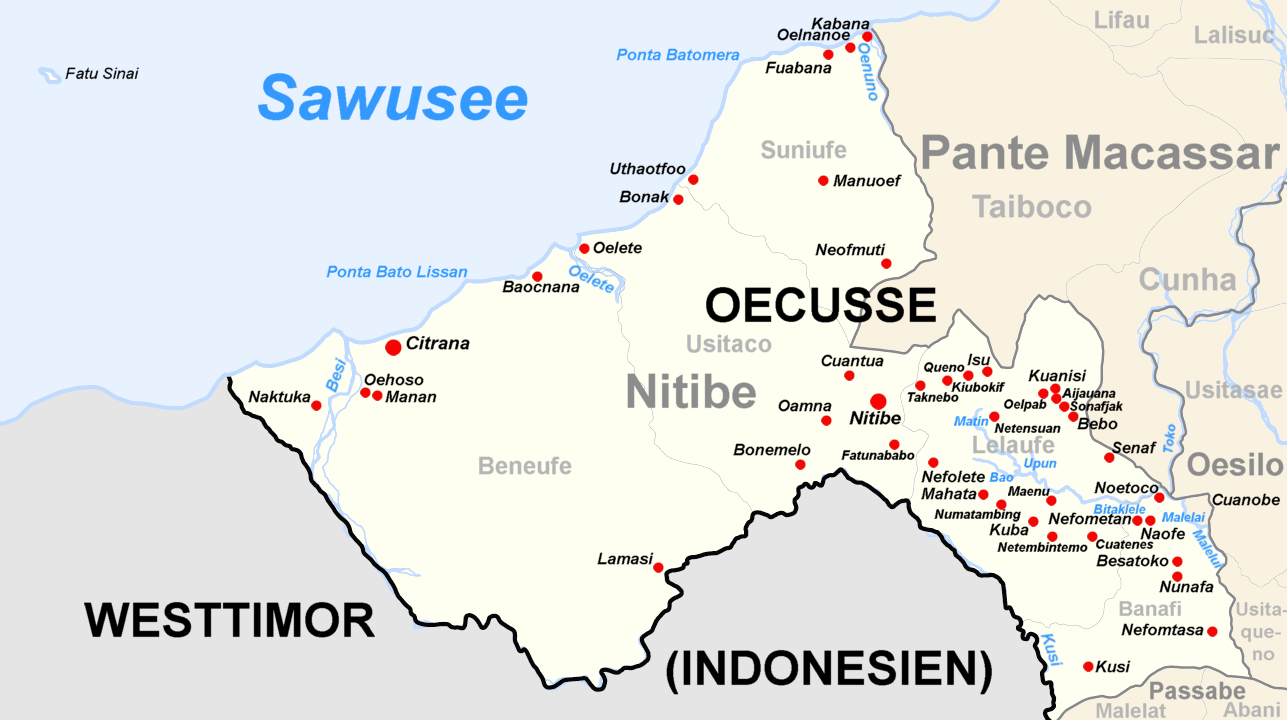
Nitibe in subdistrict of Nitibe

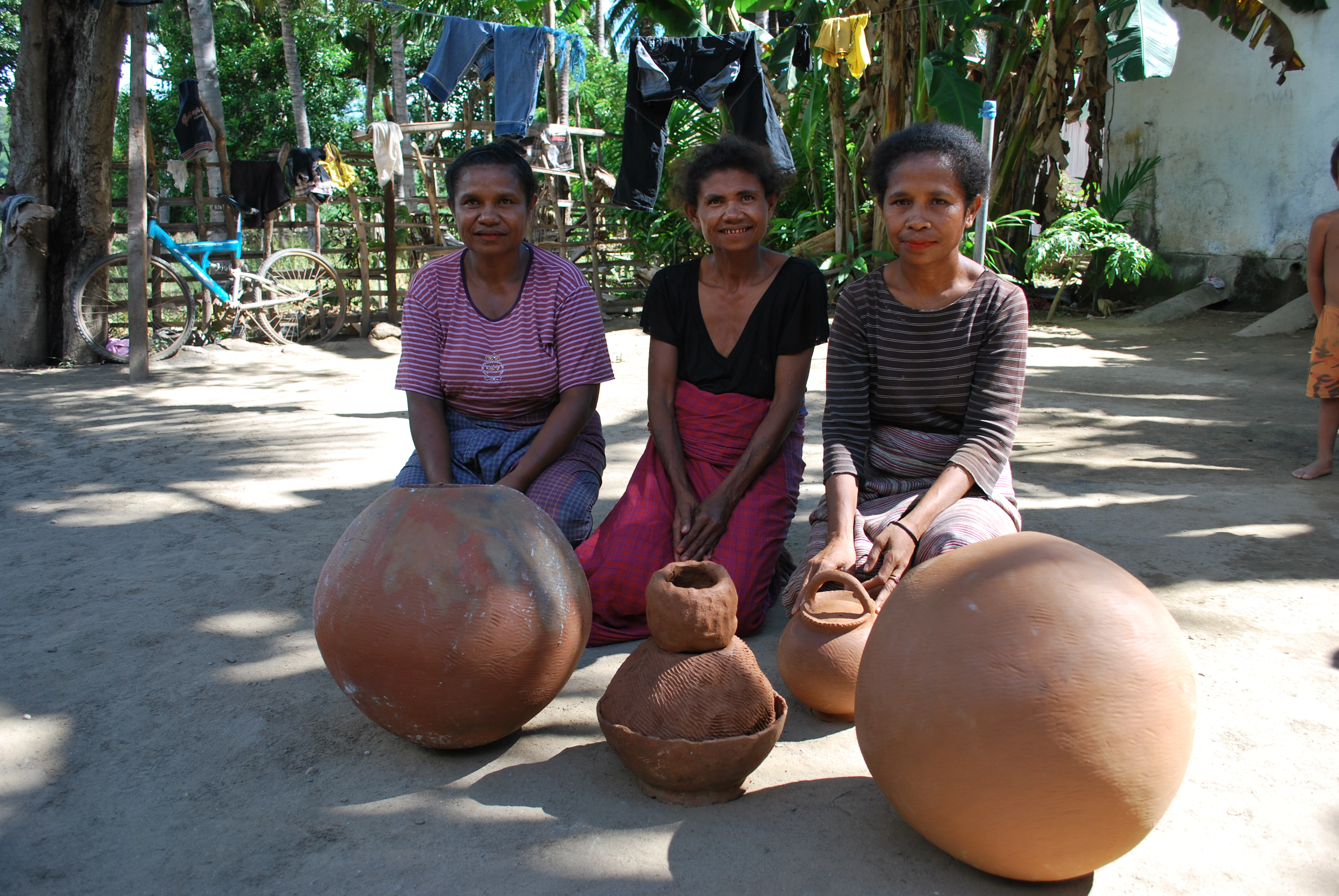
Citizens of Taknebo in Nitibe

Nitibe is a small town in Nitibe subdistrict, in the Timor-Leste exclave of Oecusse. It is located inland in the west of the exclave.
