= Oecusse Industrial (International) Special Economic Zone =

Oecusse SAR Oecusse
- Special Administrative Region
- Oecusse-Ambeno International Industrial Economic Zone (ZEESM)
- Interactive map of Oecusse SAR
- Coordinates: 9°12′S 124°22′E
- Country: Timor-Leste
- Special Zone Established: 2015

Government
  - President of ZEESM Authority: Arsenio Paixão Bano
- Time zone: UTC+09:00 (Timor-Leste Time)
- Area code: +670

The Oecusse-Ambeno International Industrial Economic Zone (Portuguese: Região Administrativa Especial Oé-Cusse Ambeno) located in Oecusse, East Timor. The local government aims to develop this zone as an integrated entertainment and digital economy hub.

The special economic zone operates under a distinct legal framework established by East Timor's 2017 Special Economic Zone Act, which grants tax incentives including a 10-year corporate tax holiday and streamlined foreign investment procedures.

== Plan ==
The zone is positioned as a multifunctional economic center, combining offshore financial services, digital industries, and large-scale tourism infrastructure. Key projects under development include five-star resorts, an international convention center, and supporting commercial facilities.The government has particularly emphasized attracting online gaming operators and virtual sports platforms, seeking to establish the region as a hub for the global digital entertainment industry.

== Infrastructure and Economy ==
Transportation connections remain limited, with current access relying primarily on helicopter services and upgraded border roads to Indonesia. Plans for an international airport have been announced but not yet realized. Energy supply currently depends on cross-border imports from Indonesia, though independent power generation projects are under consideration.

The government has legalized international offshore online gaming, incorporating online entertainment into national legislation. Both casino operating licenses and online gaming licenses have been officially approved under the new regulatory framework.

== Criticism and Challenges ==
Environmental groups have raised concerns about the ecological impact of coastal reclamation projects, particularly regarding coral reef damage.
