= Passabe =

Village in Oecusse-Ambeno, East Timor

Coordinates: 9°21′51″S 124°20′36″E

Passabe is a small village in Suco Abani (Passabe Administrative Post, Oecusse-Ambeno) in Timor-Leste, near the Indonesian border. It was the site of a massacre of East Timorese by pro-Indonesia militias in the follow-up to the 1999 referendum for Timor-Leste’s independence.

== In media ==
A documentary film, Passabe, directed by James Leong and Lynn Lee, was produced. The film documents the lives of several Passabe residents five years after the violence, including the life of a former militia member, and documented the ways in which the community has come to terms with what happened.

In January 2006, the film was banned at the Jakarta International Film Festival.
