= Cristina Amaral =

Pilot in East Timor

- Born: Oecusse, East Timor
- Occupation: Pilot
- Known for: First female pilot in Timor Leste

Cristina Amaral is the first female pilot in East Timor (Timor-Leste). She graduated from pilot training in 2015 and became a commercial pilot in 2018.

== Early life ==
Amaral grew up in the village of Costa in Oecusse, which, although part of East Timor, is an enclave entirely surrounded by the sea and the land of West Timor, which is part of Indonesia. She was the eldest of five children and had to balance responsibilities to help at home with her wish to perform well at school. Fortunately, she had a lot of support from her parents to pursue her education.

== Training and career beginning ==
After leaving school she found the opportunity to pursue a pilot training programme through a government scholarship. Performing well in the application process, she obtained a full scholarship. However, she encountered difficulties as the flight course was given in English, and was forced to move to Jakarta, Indonesia to complete her training in a language she could better understand. She graduated in 2015, to become East Timor's first female pilot but stayed in Indonesia for a further two years, working as a flight instructor.

In April 2018 she joined Aero Dili, a small airline with just two small Cessna planes that does charter flights in East Timor. Such services are very much required in the mountainous country, where the roads are few and poor.

== Awards and honours ==
- In 2015 Amaral was one of 47 "Women of Achievement" celebrated by UN Women on the 20th anniversary of the Beijing Declaration, which had been issued at the World Conference on Women, 1995.
