= Passabe Administrative Post =

Administrative post in Oecusse Municipality, Timor-Leste

Passabe
- Administrative Post
- Posto Administrativo de Passabe (Portuguese); Postu administrativu Pásabe (Tetum)
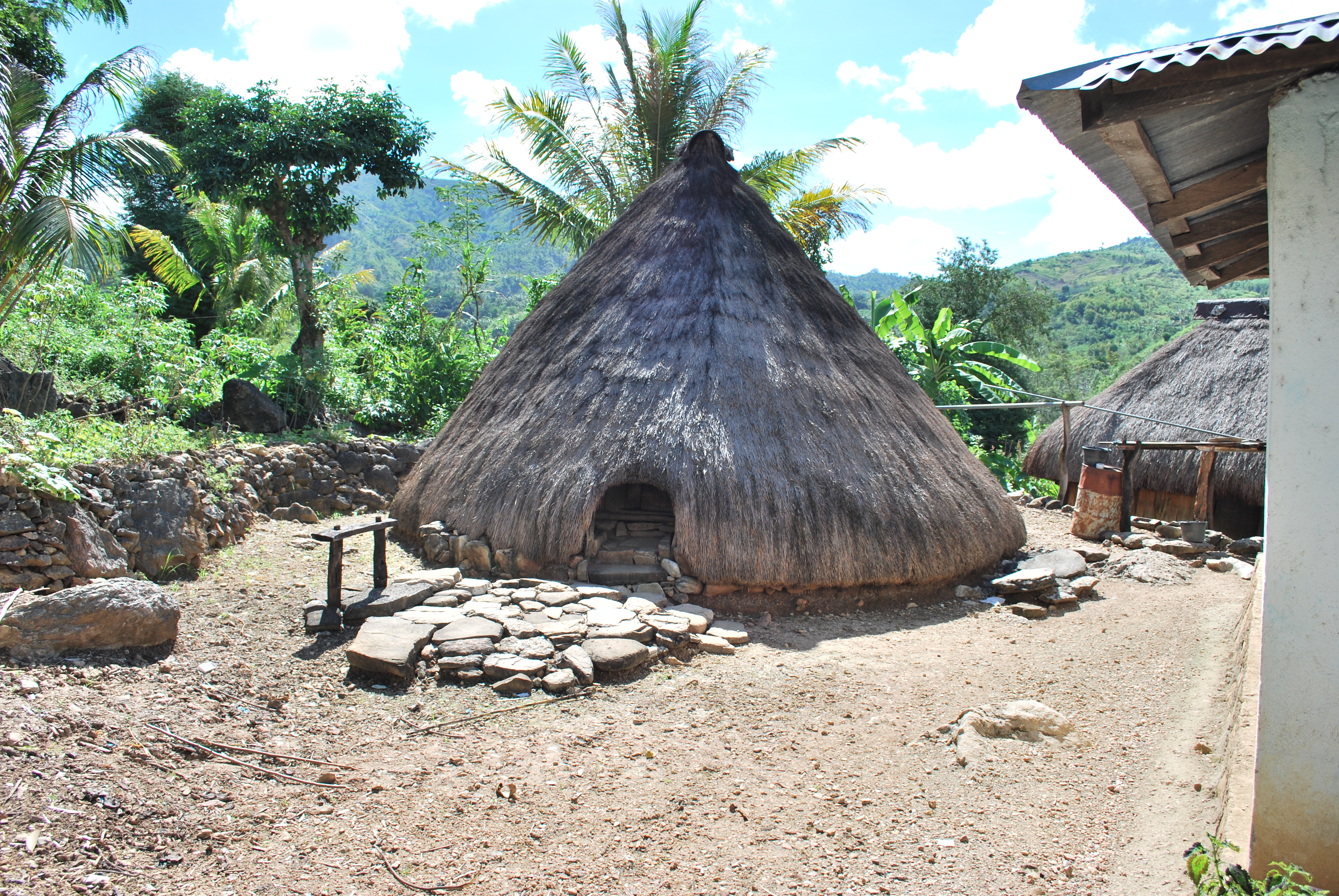
- Traditional house in Abani

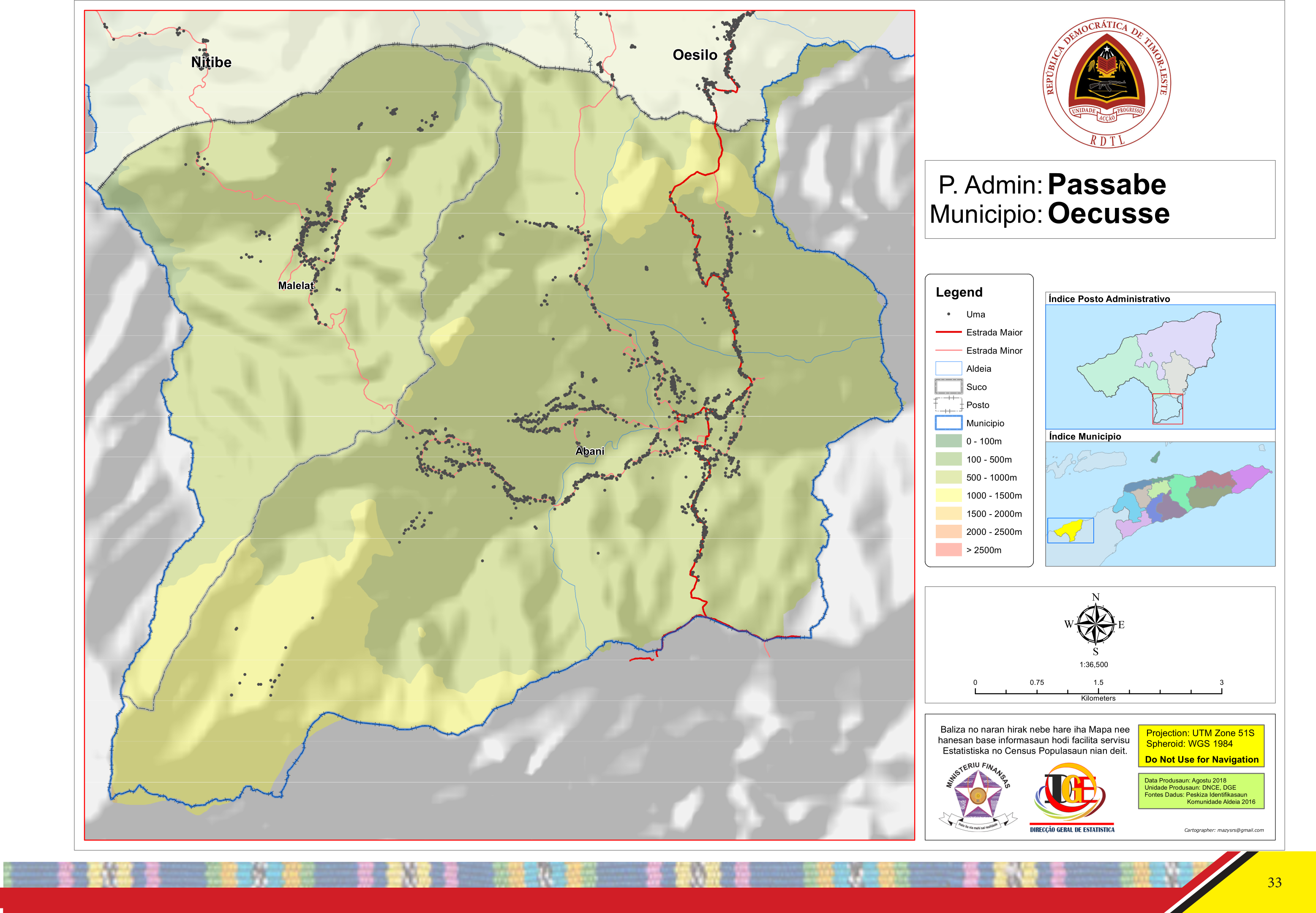
- Official map

- Location within East Timor
- Coordinates: 9°28′S 124°21′E
- Country: Timor-Leste
- Municipality: Oecusse
- Seat: Abani
- Sucos: Abani; Malelat

Area
  - Total: 60.2 km^{2} (23.2 sq mi)

Population (2015 census)
  - Total: 7,879
  - Density: 131/km^{2} (339/sq mi)

Households (2015 census)
  - Total: 1,817
- Time zone: UTC+09:00 (TLT)

Passabe, officially Passabe Administrative Post (Portuguese: Posto Administrativo de Passabe, Tetum: Postu administrativu Pásabe), is an administrative post (and was formerly a subdistrict) in the Oecusse municipality and Special Administrative Region (SAR) of Timor-Leste, which is an exclave surrounded on three sides by Indonesian West Timor. Its seat or administrative centre is the suco of Abani. In the 2004 census it had a population of 7,531 people in 1,153 households. Passabe is a small village (sulo) in the administrative post, very near the Indonesian border. It was the site of a massacre of East Timorese by pro-Indonesia militias in the follow-up to the 1999 referendum for East Timor's independence.
