= Yeni Rosa Damayanti =

- Born: July 3, 1968 (age 58); Bandung, West Java
- Education: National University, Jakarta
- Known for: Reform activist

Yeni Rosa Damayanti (born 3 July 1968) is an Indonesian activist and champion of democracy and reform. Her name was very popular in the early and mid-1990s. At that time she was a girl who was very brave to oppose and criticise the Suharto's New Order government during its height in power. The PIJAR NGO activist was imprisoned for one year for her courage in demanding that Suharto be dragged to the MPR Special Session in 1993.

Shortly after her release from detention she travelled to the Netherlands to continue her education at the Institute of Social Studies, The Hague, Netherlands, where she studied Women & Development Studies. In the Netherlands, she continued to advocate for democracy and reform for Indonesia. As a result of her activities, it was difficult for her to return home. The government through the Indonesian Embassy in the Netherlands did not allow her passport to be renewed, so she could not return to Indonesia. Shortly after the fall of Suharto, she received permission to renew her passport, so she immediately returned home. Yeni's return was welcomed by her fellow activists.

== Education ==
- Bakti Polonia Elementary School, East Jakarta
- SMAN I Boedi Oetomo, Jakarta
- Faculty of Biology, National University, Jakarta
- Institute of Social Studies, The Hague, Netherlands
