= Nitibe Administrative Post =

Administrative post in Oecusse Municipality, Timor-Leste

Nitibe
- Administrative Post
- Posto Administrativo de Nitibe (Portuguese); Postu administrativu Nítibe (Tetum)
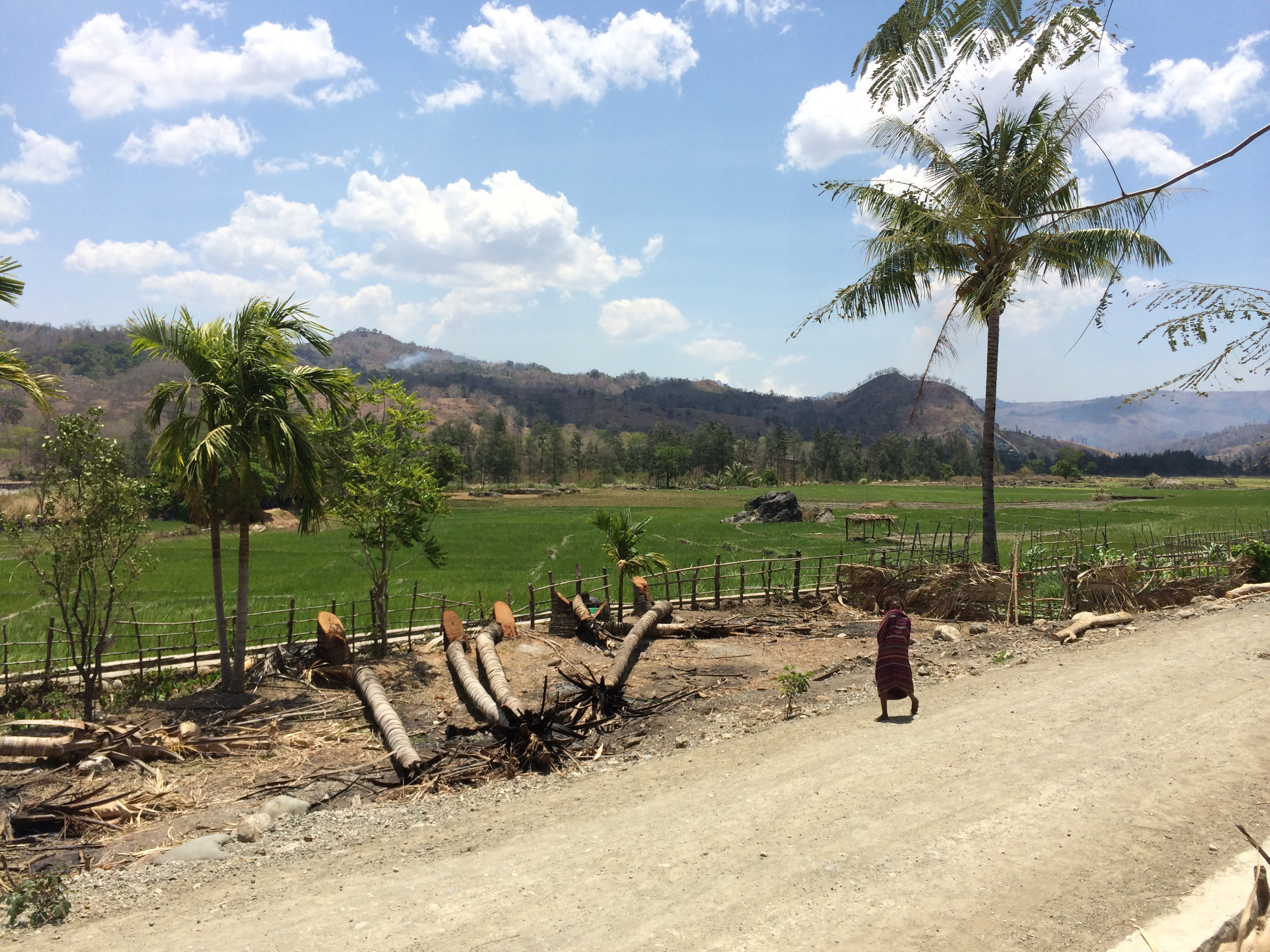
- Rice field in Lelaufe

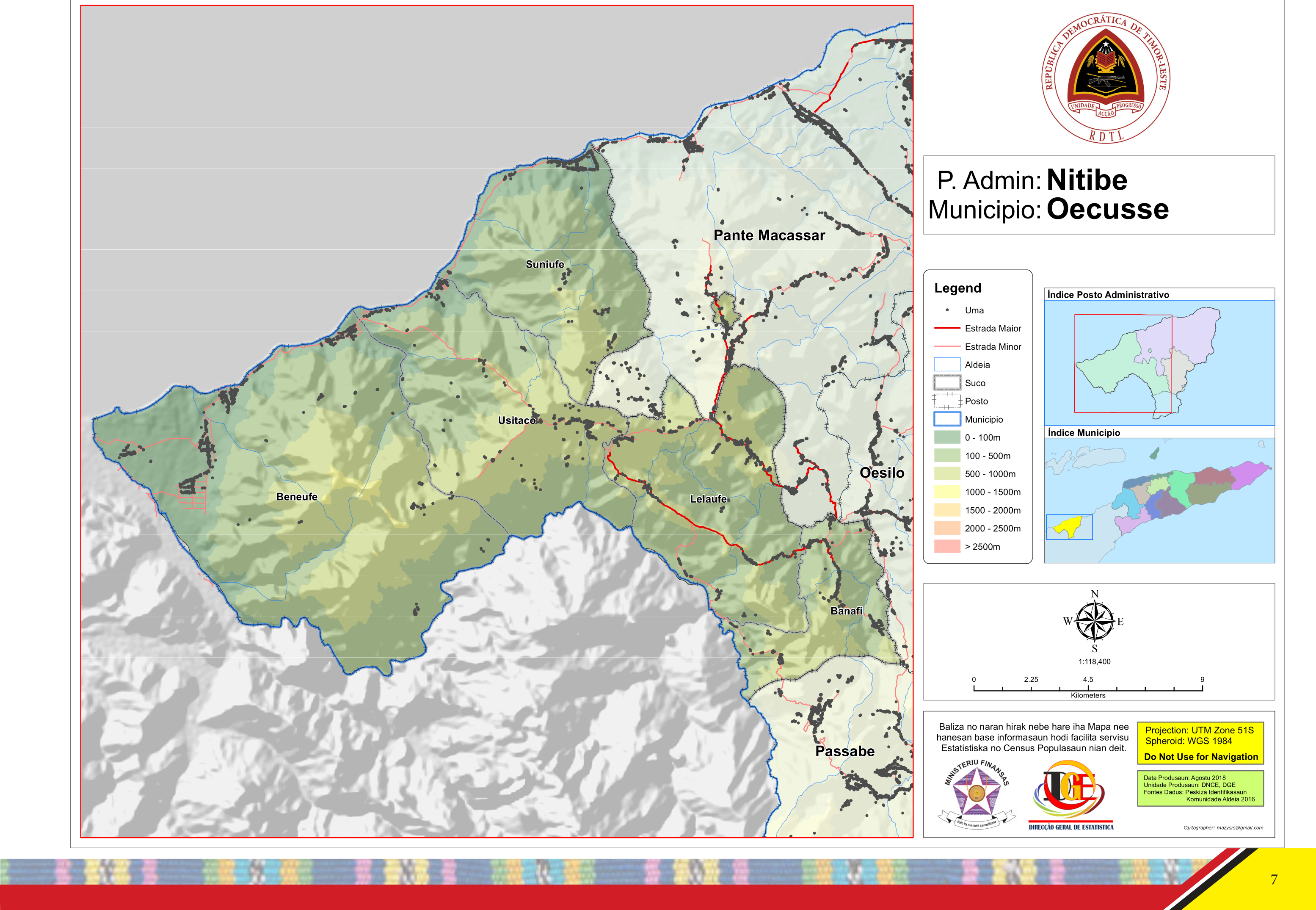
- Official map

- Location within East Timor
- Coordinates: 9°21′S 124°14′E
- Country: Timor-Leste
- Municipality: Oecusse
- Seat: Beneufe
- Sucos: Banafi; Beneufe; Lelaufe; Suniufe; Usitaco

Area
  - Total: 299.5 km^{2} (115.6 sq mi)

Population (2015 census)
  - Total: 12,273
  - Density: 40.98/km^{2} (106.1/sq mi)

Households (2015 census)
  - Total: 2,705
- Time zone: UTC+09:00 (TLT)

Nitibe, officially Nitibe Administrative Post (Portuguese: Posto Administrativo de Nitibe, Tetum: Postu administrativu Nítibe), is an administrative post (and was formerly a subdistrict) in the Oecusse municipality and Special Administrative Region (SAR) of Timor-Leste. Its seat or administrative centre is Beneufe.
