= Oecusse =

East Timorese exclave and municipality

- Municipality and Special Administrative Region
- Região Administrativa Especial Oé-Cusse Ambeno (Portuguese); Oecussi Ambeno (Tetun)
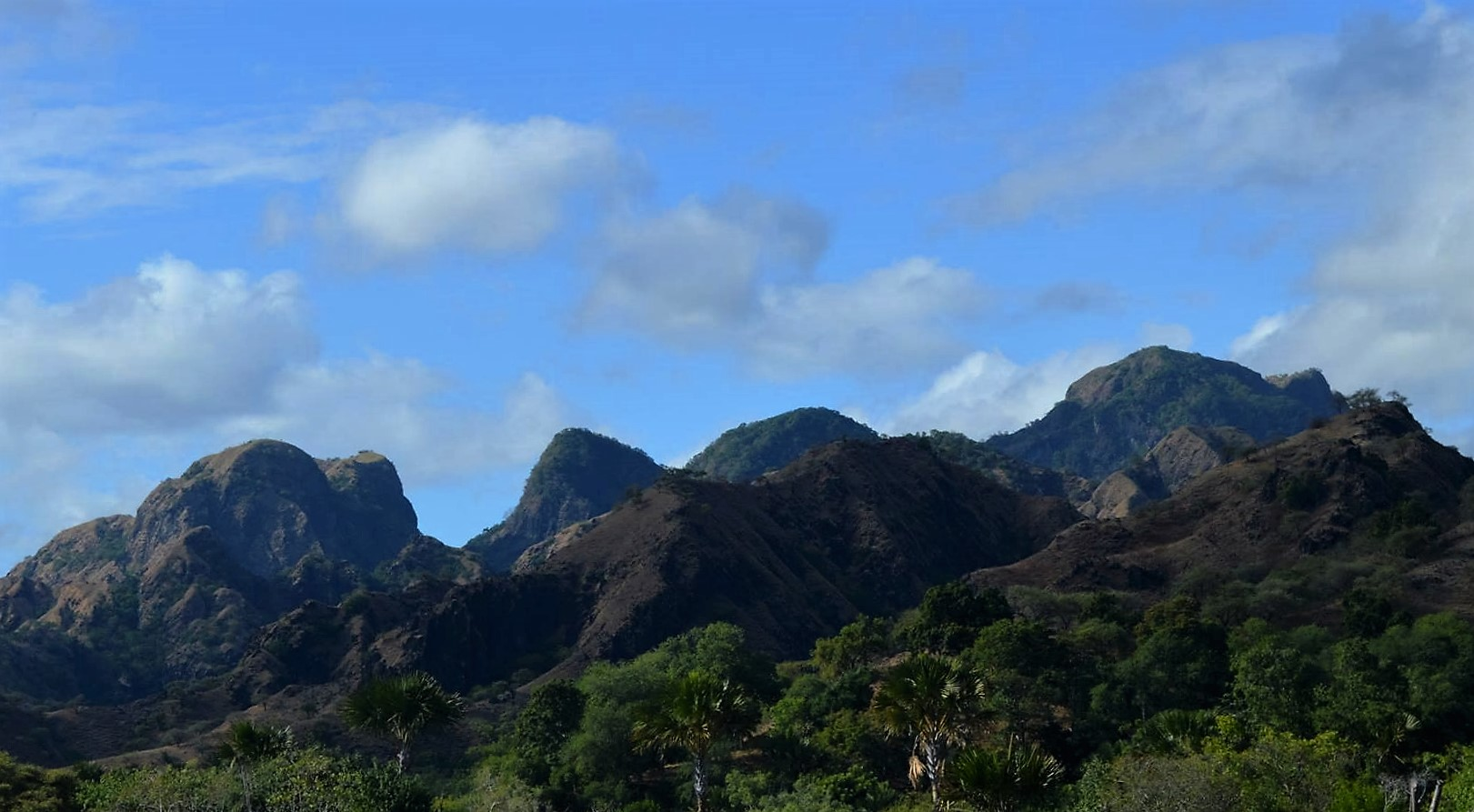
- Mountains in Oecusse in 2015

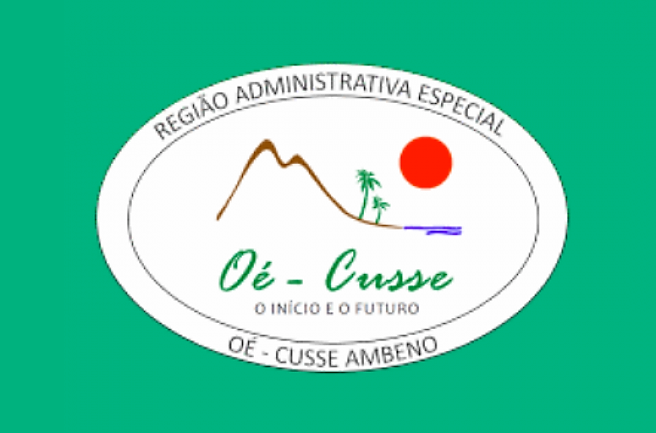
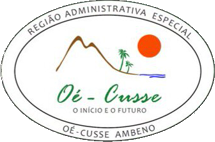
- Flag Seal

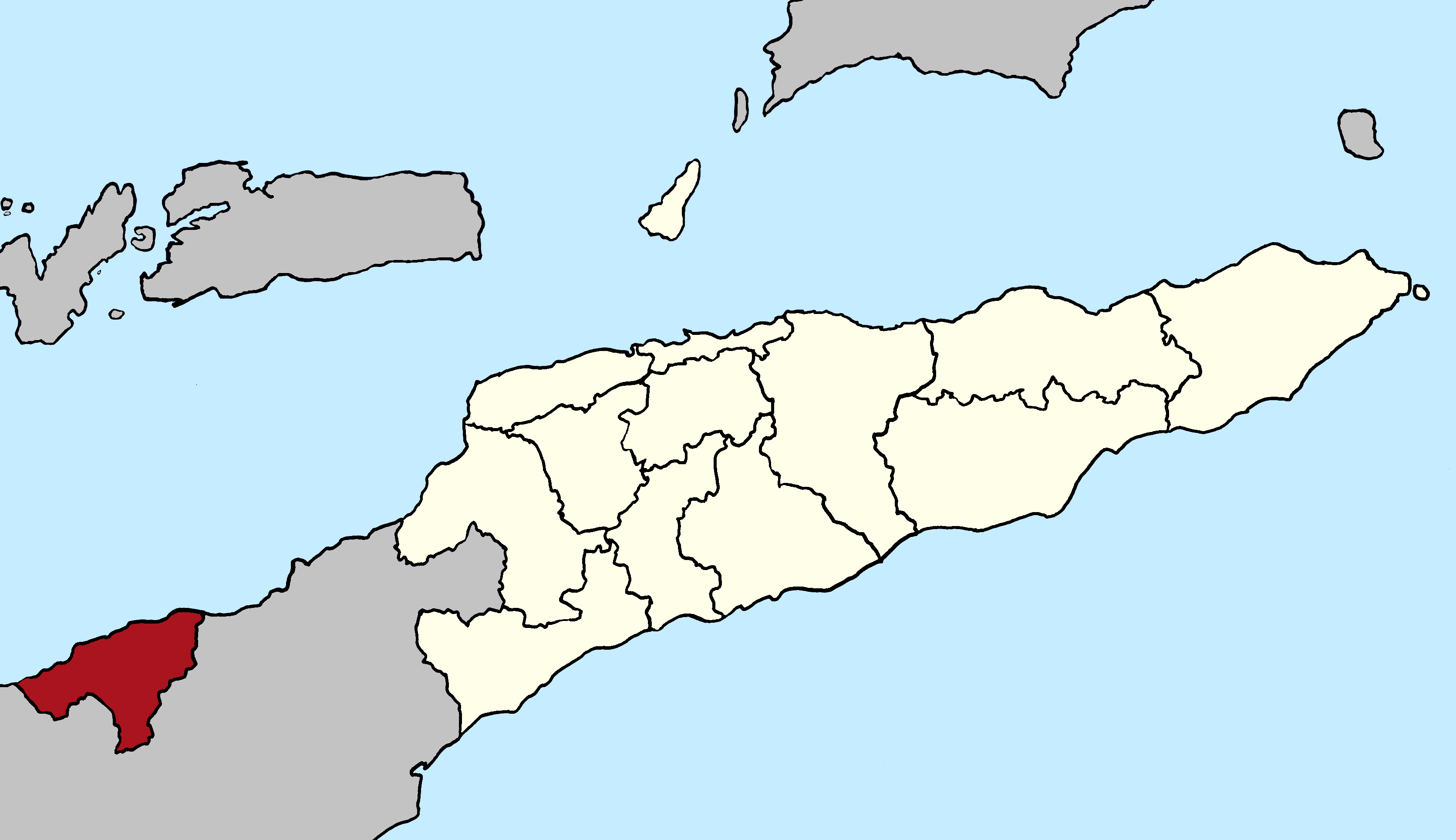
- Oecusse in Timor-Leste
- Interactive map of Oecusse
- Coordinates: 09°21′S 124°18′E
- Sovereign state: Timor-Leste
- Capital: Pante Macassar

Government
  - President of the SAR Oecusse-Ambeno: Régio da Cruz Salu

Area
  - Total: 813.6 km^{2} (314.1 sq mi)
  - Rank: 8th

Population (Census of 15 October 2022)
  - Total: 80,685
  - Rank: 6th
  - Density: 99.17/km^{2} (256.9/sq mi)
  - Rank: 4th

Households (2015 census)
  - Total: 14,345
  - Rank: 6th
- Time zone: UTC+09:00 (TLT)
- ISO 3166 code: TL-OE
- HDI (2017): 0.553 medium · 13th
- Website: www.oe-cusse.gov.tl

Oecusse, (Note: Also variously Oecussi, Ocussi, Oekussi, Oekusi, Okusi, Oé-Cusse) also known as Oecusse-Ambeno (Portuguese: Oé-Cusse Ambeno; Tetun: Oecussi Ambeno) and formerly just Ambeno, is a municipality (formerly a district) and the only Special Administrative Region (SAR) of Timor-Leste.

Located on the north coast of the western portion of Timor Island, Oecusse is a semi-exclave, separated from the rest of Timor-Leste by West Timor, which is part of the Indonesian province of East Nusa Tenggara. West Timor surrounds Oecusse on all sides except the north, where the semi-exclave faces the Savu Sea.

The capital of Oecusse is Pante Macassar, also called Oecussi Town, or formerly, in Portuguese Timor, Vila Taveiro. Originally Ambeno was the name of the former district and Oecussi its capital.

== Toponymy ==
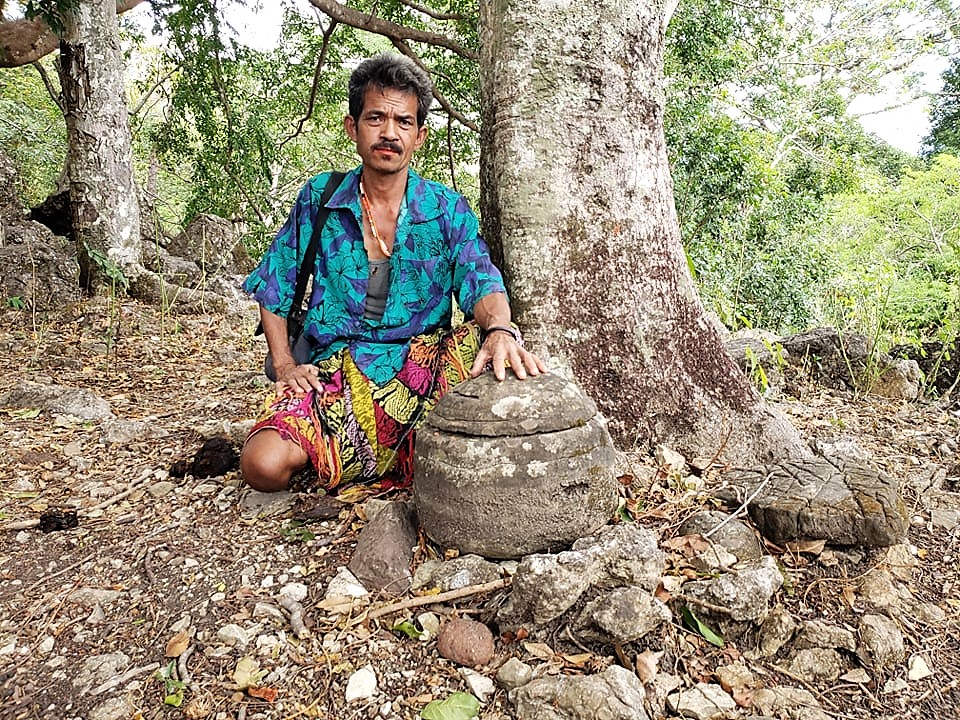
The Cussi, mythical origin of Oecusse

Oecusse is the traditional name of Pante Macassar, the present-day capital of the special administrative region, and its environs. Pante Macassar's location was also the seat of the second traditional kingdom of the area, based at Oesono. Ambeno was the historic Timorese empire that occupied most of the present-day SAR's territory; it was centred in Tulaica and Nunuhenu.

The portmanteau "Oe-Kussi", from which "Oecusse" is derived, has its origins in the local Baikeno variant of the Uab Meto language. "Oe" means "water", but there are differing interpretations for "Kussi". That word is often equated with the name of a certain type of traditional clay jug, so "Oe-Kussi" would mean something like "water pot". There is a legend about the provenance of this name, relating to a stone, the "Cussi", in the suco of Banafi. Other sources state that Kussi was a native ruler of Ambeno. The name "Ambeno" is derived from "Ambenu", which is similarly a portmanteau of two words. "Ama" or "am" means "father" or "king", and "Benu" is the name of two legendary rulers of the region.

In the Portuguese colonial period, "Oecusse" and "Ambeno" were both already being used as synonyms referring to the exclave. Later, the double-barrelled name Oecusse-Ambeno came into use. In the official list of all administrative divisions of Timor-Leste published in 2009, the then district was referred to only by its short name "Oecusse". The present day SAR is not politically divided along the borders of the old empires of the area. In Ministerial Diploma 16/2017, "Oe-Cusse Ambeno" was once again officially used.

As is not uncommon in Timor-Leste, there are numerous different spellings for the region's name: Oe-Kusi, Oecusse, Ocussi, Oecússi, Oecussi, Oekussi, Oekusi, Okusi, Oé-Cusse. The spellings with "k" are mostly derived from Tetum or other Austronesian languages, and those with "c" are spellings based on Portuguese. As has just been indicated, the double-barrelled name Oecusse-Ambeno (also Oecussi-Ambeno, Ocussi-Ambeno, Oecússi-Ambeno, Oe-Kusi Ambenu) was reactivated in official usage in 2017, in place of Oecusse on its own. The exclave is seldom now referred to only as Ambeno (Ambenu), as it was during the Indonesian occupation of East Timor.

== Geography ==
=== Overview ===
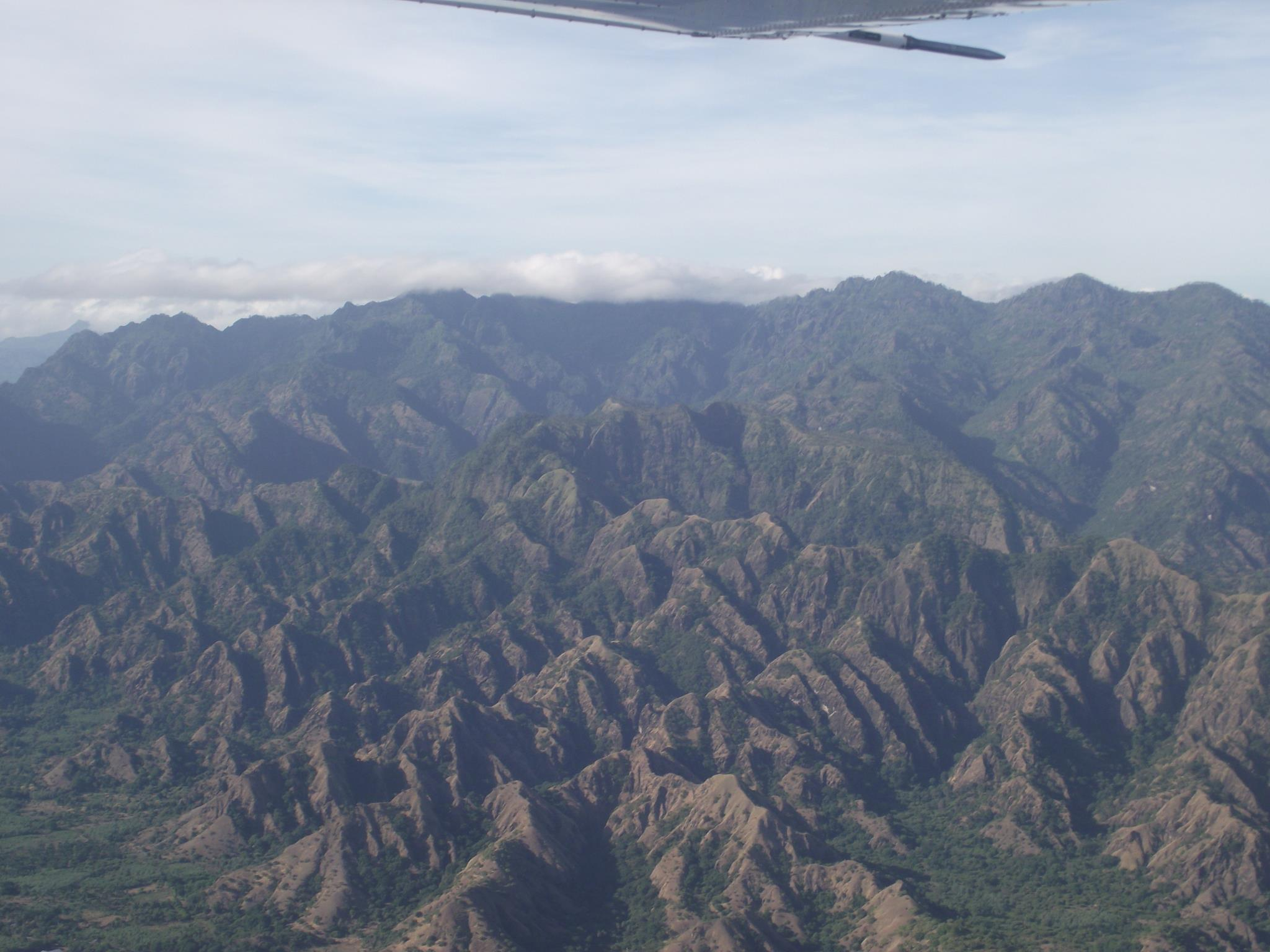
Mountains near Sacato, in the suco of Nipane

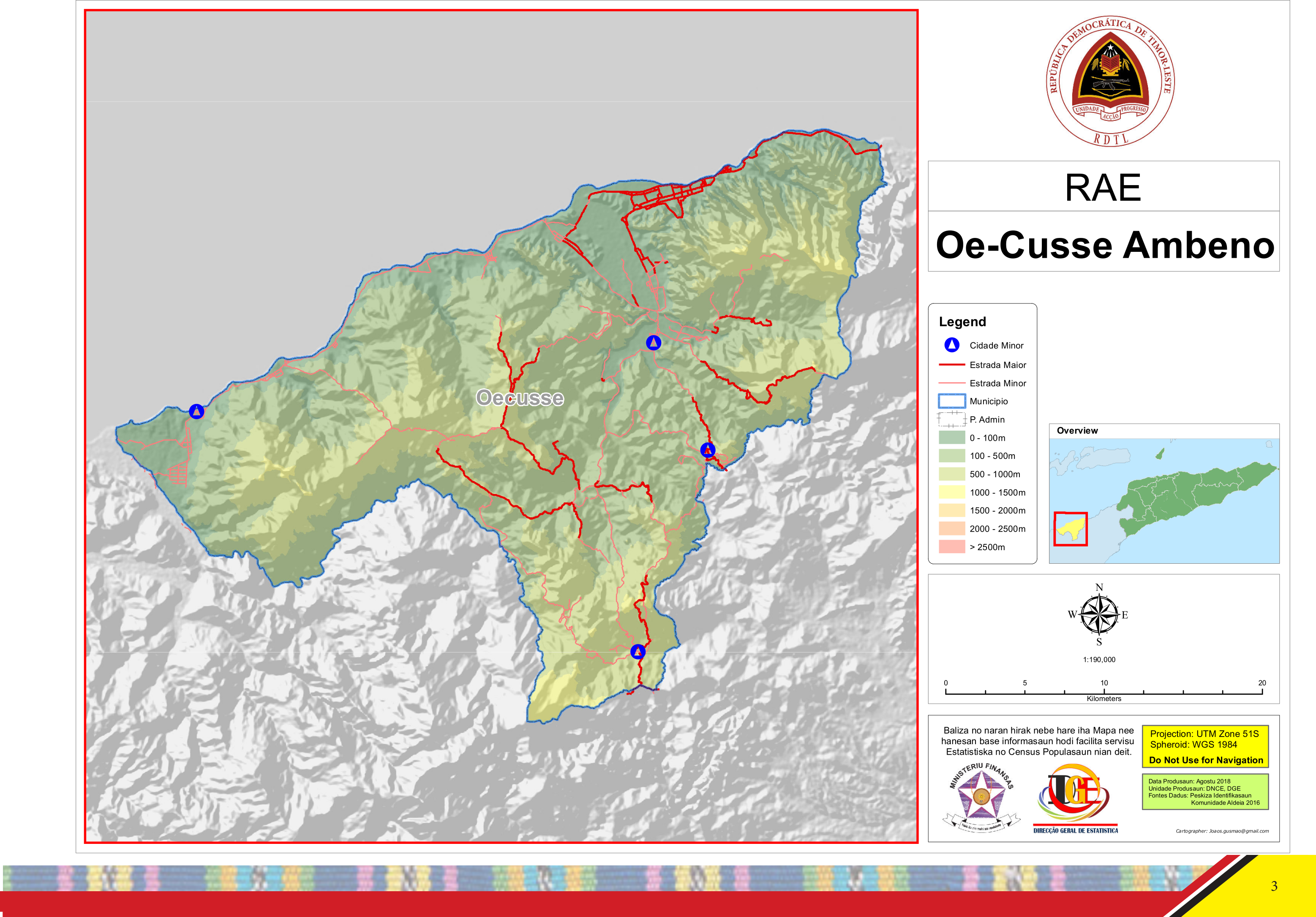
Official map of Oecusse SAR

Oecusse SAR has a total area of 813.6 km^{2} (314.1 sq mi). It is completely surrounded by Indonesian territory, except to the north, where it faces Ombai Strait (at that point, part of the Savu Sea). Geographically, the rest of Timor-Leste is 58 km (36 mi) east of the SAR's easternmost tip; by road, the distance is more than 70 km (43 mi).

In the north of the SAR, a coastal plain and savanna rise to relatively arid hills up to 1,000 m (3,300 ft) AMSL, and then mountains. The main river in the exclave is the Tono River, which flows into the Savu Sea near Lifau, just west of Pante Macassar. Outside the rainy season, however, the river, although perennial, comes close to drying up. Away from the Tono valley, the SAR consists essentially of a landscape rising sharply to at least 800–900 m (2,600–3,000 ft) AMSL.

The northeast of the SAR has the wildest and youngest of the whole island's surface structure, and is partially of volcanic origin. Close to the SAR's northeastern border, within the Pante Macassar administrative post, is the Sapu (Fatu Nipane) (1,259 m (4,131 ft) AMSL). In the southernmost post of the SAR's administrative divisions, Passabe, the land rises continuously and, at the SAR's southwestern tip, reaches Bisae Súnan (1,560 m (5,120 ft) AMSL), the highest peak in the whole of the SAR. Other mountains in the SAR include the Manoleu (1,171 m (3,842 ft) AMSL) in the west of the Nitibe administrative post, and the Puas (1,121 m (3,678 ft) in Passabe.

Around 30% of the SAR is wooded, mostly by forest and Eucalyptus woodland, which is often threatened by slash-and-burn (swidden) agriculture and illegal tree cutting. South of the town of Oesilo (in the suco of Bobometo) are active mud volcanoes.

At its far western extremity, the SAR extends to the Indonesian regency of Kupang; to the east and south lies the North Central Timor Regency. The SAR's land border is about 300 km (190 mi) in length, its coastline about 50 km (31 mi) long. There are border crossings at Bobometo (Oesilo) – Napan (Indonesia), Citrana (Nitibe) – Oipoli (Indonesia), and Passabe (Passabe) – Haumeni Ana (Indonesia) leading to West Timor, and at Sacato (Pante Macassar) – Wini (Indonesia) leading both to West Timor and, via another crossing, to the main part of Timor-Leste.

As of 2019, Timor-Leste and Indonesia were at odds over the Área Cruz (Passabe), until it was agreed that it belonged to Timor-Leste. Also disputed are the 1,069 ha (2,640 acres) 'Citrana Triangle', the town of Naktuka (Nitibe) and Batek Island (or Fatu Sinai), 12 km (7.5 mi) off the coast of the SAR's westernmost point.

=== Climate ===
Oecusse has a tropical savanna climate (Köppen Aw) with a hot, humid and uncomfortable wet season from December to April and a hot, less humid dry season from May to November.

The temperature in Oecusse depends on elevation. In the coastal lowlands, it is about 31–33 °C (88–91 °F) in daytime (20–25 °C (68–77 °F) at night). With each 1,000 m (3,300 ft) of elevation, it decreases about 4–5 °C (39–41 °F). The annual precipitation rate is 1,000–2,500 mm (39–98 in). As in many parts of Timor, some areas become isolated in the rainy season because of flooding.

Climate data for Oecusse (1919–1963)
Month	Jan	Feb	Mar	Apr	May	Jun	Jul	Aug	Sep	Oct	Nov	Dec	Year
Record high °C (°F)	32.3 (90.1)	31.3 (88.3)	33.4 (92.1)	34.6 (94.3)	34.8 (94.6)	33.8 (92.8)	33.2 (91.8)	33.8 (92.8)	34.7 (94.5)	35.4 (95.7)	33.6 (92.5)	32.0 (89.6)	35.4 (95.7)
Mean daily maximum °C (°F)	29.7 (85.5)	29.3 (84.7)	29.8 (85.6)	30.4 (86.7)	30.7 (87.3)	30.3 (86.5)	29.6 (85.3)	29.1 (84.4)	28.8 (83.8)	29.4 (84.9)	30.6 (87.1)	30.3 (86.5)	29.8 (85.6)
Daily mean °C (°F)	27.3 (81.1)	27.0 (80.6)	27.2 (81.0)	27.6 (81.7)	27.7 (81.9)	27.1 (80.8)	26.2 (79.2)	26.0 (78.8)	26.3 (79.3)	27.5 (81.5)	28.4 (83.1)	27.9 (82.2)	27.2 (81.0)
Mean daily minimum °C (°F)	24.9 (76.8)	23.6 (74.5)	23.1 (73.6)	22.8 (73.0)	22.8 (73.0)	22.0 (71.6)	20.8 (69.4)	20.4 (68.7)	20.3 (68.5)	22.0 (71.6)	23.6 (74.5)	23.8 (74.8)	22.5 (72.5)
Record low °C (°F)	20.5 (68.9)	21.6 (70.9)	19.0 (66.2)	20.4 (68.7)	18.5 (65.3)	16.0 (60.8)	15.6 (60.1)	16.4 (61.5)	17.0 (62.6)	18.0 (64.4)	20.9 (69.6)	21.8 (71.2)	15.6 (60.1)
Average rainfall mm (inches)	282.0 (11.10)	228.6 (9.00)	205.5 (8.09)	89.0 (3.50)	36.6 (1.44)	7.7 (0.30)	6.2 (0.24)	2.6 (0.10)	1.3 (0.05)	15.6 (0.61)	54.2 (2.13)	177.3 (6.98)	1,106.6 (43.54)
Average rainy days (≥ 0.1 mm)	16	15	13	7	2	1	1	0	0	2	5	14	76
Average relative humidity (%)	78	78	76	74	68	63	65	67	71	76	75	77	72
Mean monthly sunshine hours	182.9	166.7	248.0	264.0	294.5	279.0	297.6	310.0	351.0	316.2	294.0	235.6	3,239.5
Mean daily sunshine hours	5.9	5.9	8.0	8.8	9.5	9.3	9.6	10.0	11.7	10.2	9.8	7.6	8.8
Source: Deutscher Wetterdienst

== History ==
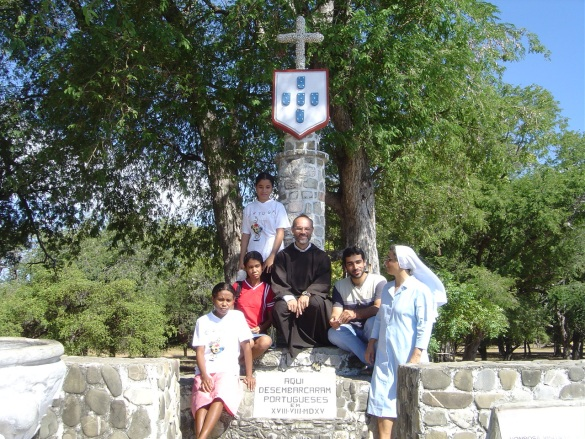
A padrão in Lifau marks the spot where the Portuguese first landed on Timor in 1515.

Oecusse and Ambeno are the names of the two original kingdoms in the area, of which Ambeno existed before the colonial period.

Oecusse was among the first parts of the island of Timor on which the Portuguese established themselves, and is thus usually considered the cradle of Timor-Leste.

In about 1556, the Dominican friar António Taveiro, operating from a base on Solor, started missionary work on the north coast of Timor. Shortly after this, in 1569, the village of "Alifao" (Lifau) is mentioned on a European map. It was situated five kilometres to the west of modern Pante Macassar. For the Portuguese traders in sandalwood, Lifau was a convenient place to land since it was situated to the south of their base in the Solor Archipelago. The area was dominated by the Ambeno kingdom, which was sometimes referred as the kingdom of Lifau.

In 1641 the Dominican priests baptised the royal families of the Ambeno, Mena and Amanuban kingdoms, which meant that Portuguese influence increased in parts of western Timor. Migration of Topasses, a Eurasian population, rose in the 1650s from Larantuka on Flores. After 1664 they were governed by officers belonging to the Hornay and Costa families, and were able to dominate most of Timor. The Topass leaders used Lifau as their main stronghold on Timor, but still resided much of their time in Larantuka. In the second half of the seventeenth century they made great profits through the sandalwood trade, attracting merchants from Siam, Batavia, Macao, and Goa. The precious wood was brought to Lifau and sold to external traders under Topass supervision.

In 1702, Lifau became the authorised capital of the colony when it received the first governor from Goa. The following period saw frequent clashes between the governor and the independent-minded Topasses, who had their strongholds in Tulicão west of Lifau, and Animata in the inland. Under their leader Gaspar da Costa they attacked the Dutch colonial post at Kupang in 1749 but were smashingly defeated in the Battle of Penfui, and subsequently moved their residence to Pante Macassar (Oecusse) in 1759 due to Dutch military pressure. The capital of the governor was transferred from Lifau to Dili in 1769, because of the frequent attacks from the Topass leader Francisco Hornay III. Most of West Timor was left to Dutch forces, who were conquering what is today Indonesia. The Eurasian leadership of Oecusse by and by turned into a Timorese kingship, and members of the Hornay and Costa families reigned as Liurai (kings) until modern times. They regularly intermarried with the Ambeno royalty. In the 1780s a reconciliation took place between the governor in Dili and the Topasses, who henceforth usually supported the Portuguese government.

In 1859, with the Treaty of Lisbon, Portugal and the Netherlands divided the island between them. West Timor became Dutch, with its colonial seat at Kupang, and Timor-Leste became Portuguese, with its seat in Dili. This left Oecusse and Noimuti as enclaves surrounded by Dutch territory. In 1912 the Liurai of Ambeno, João da Cruz, staged a revolt against the Portuguese. It was quickly put down, after which the Ambeno kingdom lapsed. The Liurai of Oecusse became dominant in the entire Oecusse exclave. The definitive border was drawn by The Hague in 1916. Apart from Japanese occupation during World War II, the border remained the same until the end of the colonial period. The region was given the status of county (conselho), named Oecússi, by the Portuguese government in August 1973, the last Timorese area to receive it.

Indonesian forces invaded Oecusse on 6 June 1975. In October they occupied the western border districts of Timor-Leste's main territory. It was in Pante Macassar that an Indonesian fifth column raised the Indonesian flag on 29 November 1975, a week before the official Indonesian invasion of Timor-Leste proper. However, even under Indonesian rule, Oecusse was administered as part of the province of Timor-Leste, as it had been as part of Portuguese Timor. Like much of the country, it suffered violent attacks near the 1999 referendum for independence. Over 90 percent of the infrastructure was destroyed. It became part of the independent state of Timor-Leste on 20 May 2002.

In the 1970s and 1980s, anarchist New Zealander Bruce Grenville began a hoax, claiming to have founded the sultanate of Occussi-Ambeno. He invented a history for the state of tribes united against the Portuguese, and produced many cinderella stamps for his creation.

On 11 November 1999, over 600 Australian troops from 3RAR (Third Battalion, Royal Australian Regiment) deployed from Maliana in Timor-Leste proper to Oecusse to liberate the enclave. They stayed there until late February 2000, being replaced by Jordanian troops.

== Politics ==
Articles 5 and 71 of the 2002 constitution provide that Oecussi Ambeno be governed by a special administrative policy and economic regime. Law 03/2014 of 18 June 2014 created the Special Administrative Region of Oecusse Ambeno (Região Administrativa Especial de Oecusse Ambeno, RAEOA). A national development programme to implement governmental policy, called ZEESM TL (Special Zones of Social Market Economy of Timor-Leste) is in place. The President of RAEOA & ZEESM TL was Mari Alkatiri, a former Prime Minister of Timor-Leste.

The Timor-Leste government that established the ZEESM TL programme was hoping that it would bring economic sustainability before the country's oil and gas reserves run out. During a visit to Oecusse in November 2015, the then Prime Minister, Rui Maria de Araújo, claimed that the government's investment in the Region would benefit all people in Timor-Leste, not just those in Oecusse. However, there has been criticism of the programme's lack of transparency and accountability, and its absence of any public cost-benefit or risk analysis, or any significant private investment. Questions have also been raised as to whether the programme is one that is necessarily appropriate for the area, or likely to be in the best interests of its citizens.

According to one commentator, many observers of Timor-Leste's strategic investment choices have wondered, "Why is the government of a country comprised of [largely] subsistence farmers obsessed with glitzy prestige projects at the expense of more pressing needs such as health and agriculture?" Yet the same commentator has also noted, more recently, that the imposition of the programme generated a plurality of opinions and reactions in Oecusse, mostly eliciting curiosity and the will to cautiously negotiate solutions. Not only did the local population adapt to the programme and endure significant changes in their lifestyles; additionally, some aspects of the programme were modified in some significant detail to accommodate deep and strongly expressed popular sentiments.

== Administrative posts ==
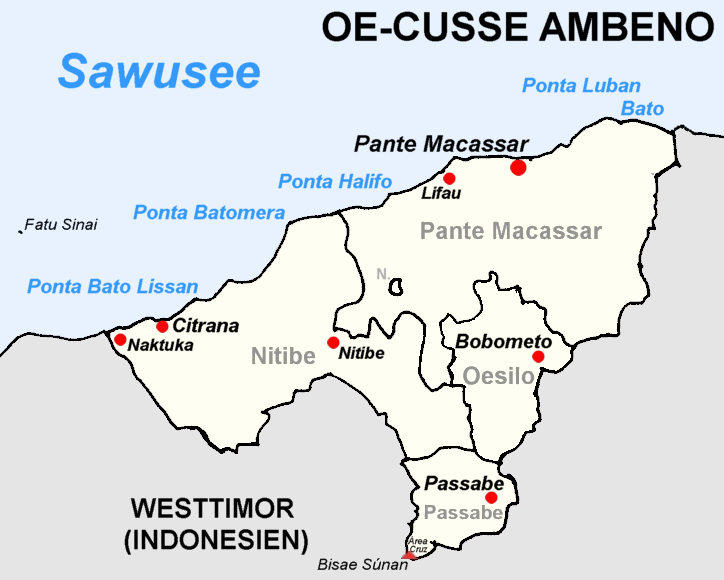
Subdivisions of Oecusse

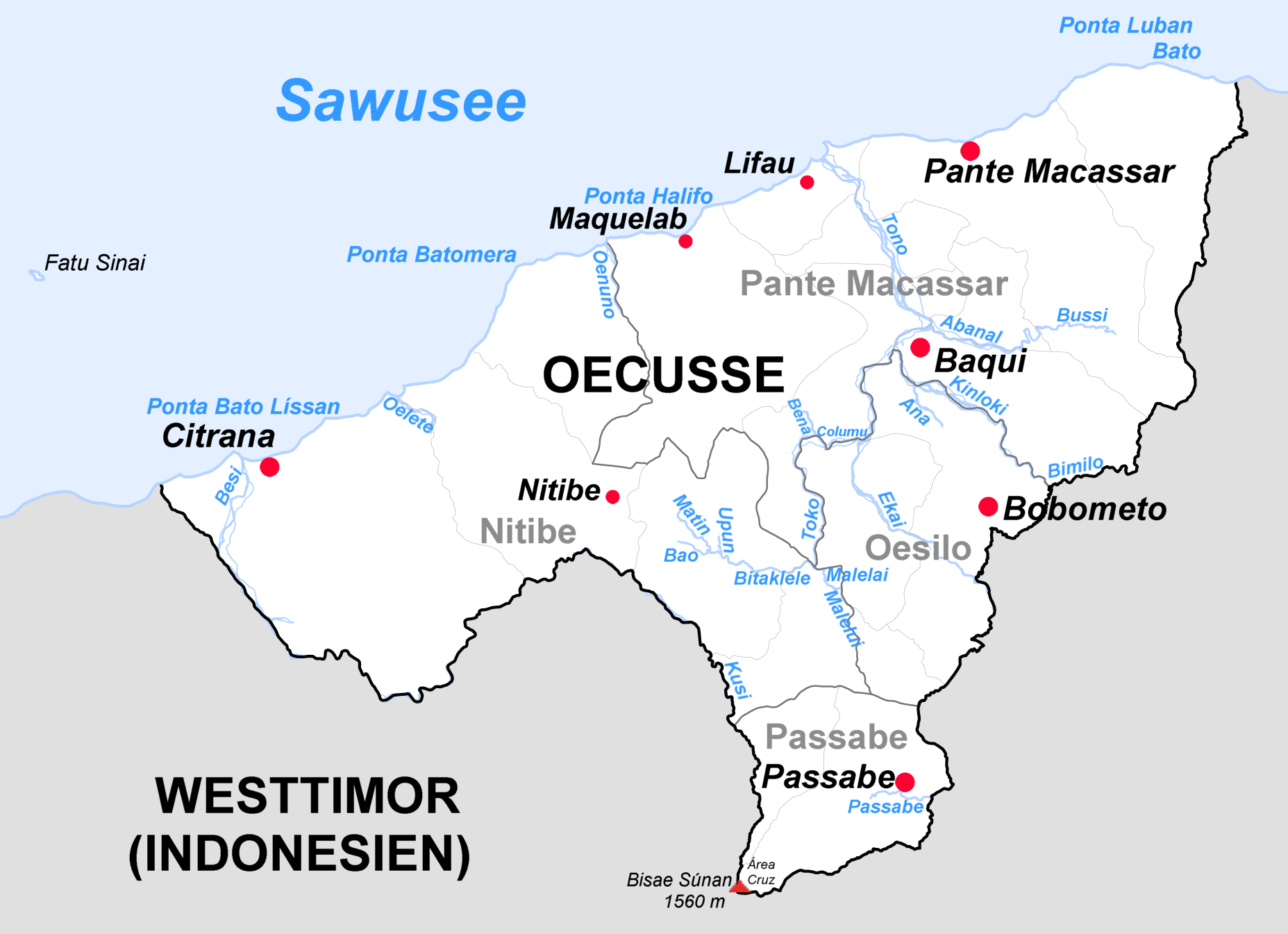
Cities and rivers of Oecusse

Oecusse is divided into four administrative posts (formerly sub-districts):

- Nitibe
- Oesilo
- Pante Macassar (with capital Pante Macassar)
- Passabe

The administrative posts are divided into 18 sucos (villages) in total.

== Demographics ==
=== Population ===
According to the 2015 Census, Oecusse had a population of 68,913 people, divided into 14,345 households. The Census of 15 October 2022 gave a total of 80,176.

The Atoni Pah Meto (typically just referred to as the Meto) are the dominant ethnic group, and Meto is the only indigenous language spoken. The Meto people also dominate the population of Indonesian West Timor.

=== Languages ===
The native language of most residents is Uab Meto (Meto), often referred to by outsiders as Baikeno. Portuguese is used in education and government, although despite its status as an official language there are few fluent speakers.

Although Indonesian was used as a lingua franca until 1999, since then it has been almost completely replaced in this role by Tetum which is the primary language of government, education and public life in Timor-Leste and is spoken and understood in all but very remote areas of the SAR.

=== Religion ===
99.3% of the inhabitants are Roman Catholic and 0.6% Protestant. There were 36 Hindus, 21 Muslims, 10 Animists and one Buddhist in the 2010 census. As is common throughout Timor-Leste most Catholics practise a syncretic variety of the religion and continue to pay homage to sacred sites and ancestral spirits, a suite of practices usually referred to using the Indonesian loanword, 'adat'.

== Transport ==
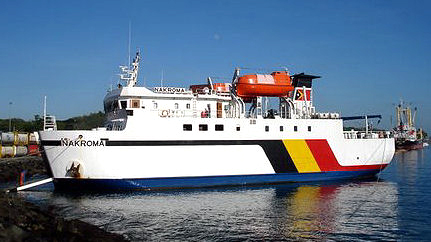
The Berlin Nakroma

=== Air ===
The new Oecusse or Rota do Sandalo International Airport was inaugurated by East Timorese President Francisco Guterres on 18 June 2019 and serves as the main gateway to Oecusse. The airport was previously an airstrip located at the edge of Pante Macassar and was refurbished at a cost of US$119 million. Previously, there were six return flights a week to and from capital Dili.

=== Road ===
Main roads link Pante Macassar to Sacato 15 km (10 miles) to the east, and Bobometo to the south-east, both of which are on the Indonesia–Timor-Leste border and are official border crossings into Indonesia. The integrated border post at Sacato (also spelled Sakato) is the major crossing for Oecusse as it is on the shortest land route between Oecusse and Timor-Leste proper via the border crossing at Mota'ain/Batugade. The Indonesian checkpoint across the border from Sacato is Wini. The Bobometo border crossing (with Napan on the Indonesian side) in on the road to Kefamenanu.

A network of minor roads link other areas within Oecusse Municipality with Pante Macassar and the capitals of administrative posts. On 12 June 2017 a bridge over the Tono River was inaugurated by the president of Timor-Leste, Francisco Guterres. The Noefefan Bridge connects the isolated regions to the west of the Tono River to Pante Macassar, providing them permanent access to markets, the ferry and airport, even during the rainy season (November to April).

Roads also lead to minor border crossings in Passabe (with Haumeniana also in North Central Timor Regency) and Citrana (with Oepoli in Kupang Regency), mostly catering to crossings by residents of border villages.

=== Sea ===
The ferry Berlin Nakroma connects Oecusse to Dili, arriving twice a week on a journey which takes 12 hours.

== Notable people ==
- Cristina Amaral, first female pilot in East Timor
- Arsenio Baro, politician
- Noémia Sequeira, politician
- Jorge Teme, politician and first Timorese diplomat to go to Australia

== See also ==
- Oecusse-Ambeno International Industrial Economic Zone
