= Indonesia–Timor-Leste border =

International border

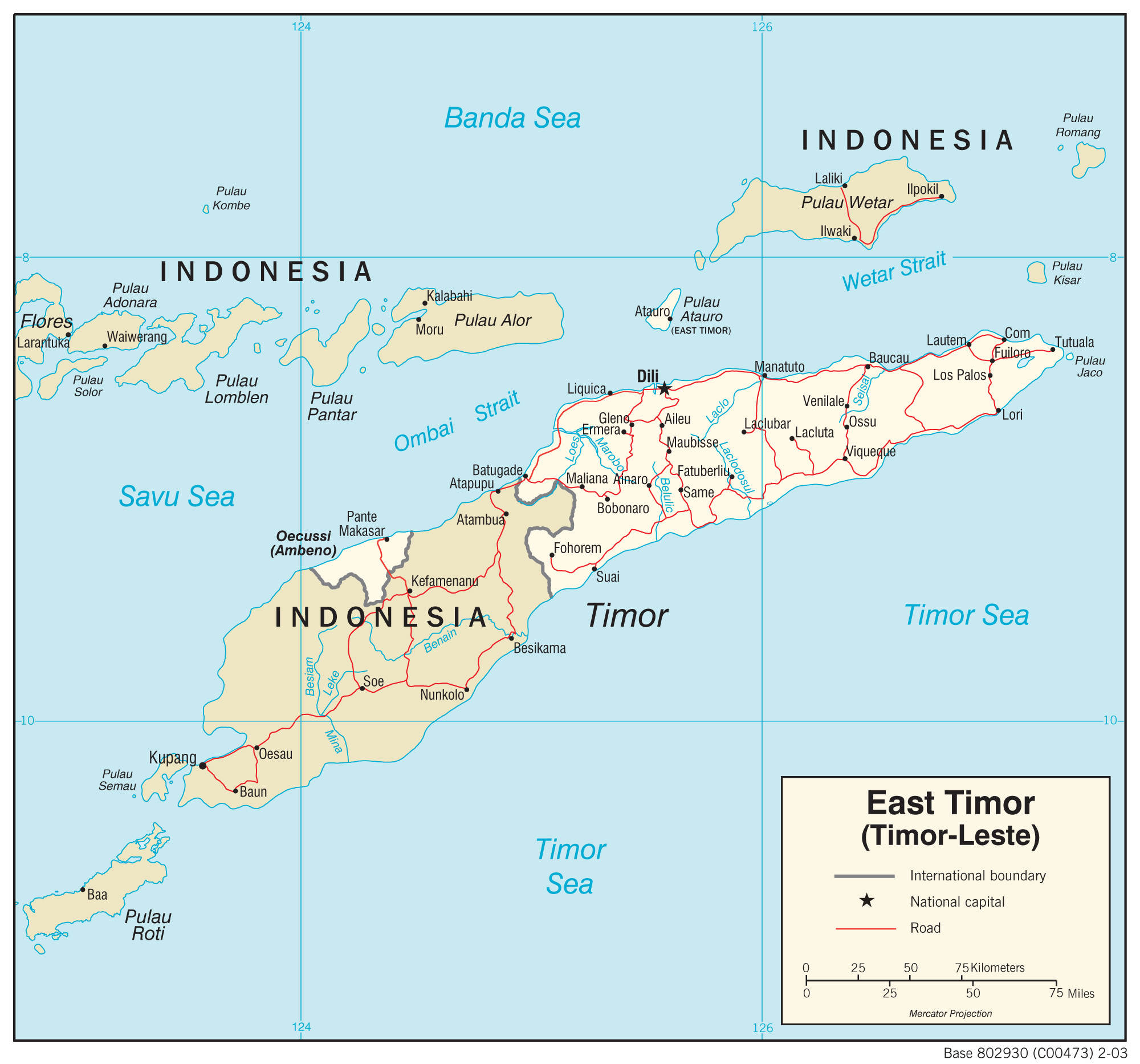
- Map of the Indonesia–Timor-Leste border

Characteristics
- Entities: Timor-Leste Indonesia
- Length: 253 km (157 mi)
- Enclave and exclaves: Oecusse

History
- Established: 25 June 1914; Court of Arbitration's award
- Current shape: 2002; East Timor independence (pre 1976 border restored but as an independent state rather than Overseas province of Portgual
- Disestablished: 1976; Indonesian invasion of East Timor (restored 2002)
- Treaties: Treaty of Lisbon of 1859; 1999 East Timorese independence referendum

The Indonesia–Timor-Leste border is the international border between Timor-Leste and Indonesia. The border consists of two non-contiguous sections totalling 253 km (157 mi) in length, the larger section of which divides the island of Timor in two. The demarcation of the border between Indonesia and Timor-Leste has been fought over by various parties for 350 years. The first attempts to define it precisely were made by the colonial powers of the Netherlands and Portugal with the Treaty of Lisbon in 1859, but it was not until the Permanent Court of Arbitration's award of 25 June 1914 that the final land border between them on the island of Timor was established. It largely coincides with today's border between the state of Timor-Leste (East Timor), which only gained its final independence in 2002, and West Timor, which belongs to Indonesia, but was still disputed on some points until 2019.

== Description ==
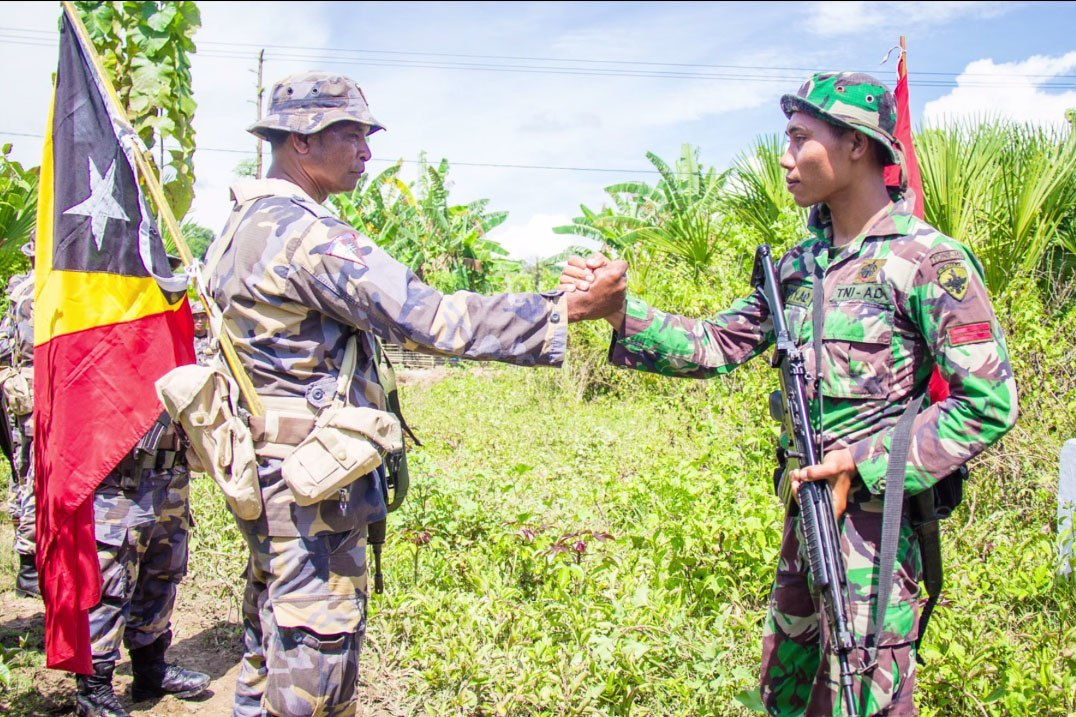
An East Timorese border guard and an Indonesian soldier

=== Western (Oecusse) section ===
The Municipality of Oecusse forms an exclave of Timor-Leste in Indonesian West Timor (part of East Nusa Tenggara province). The border starts in the west at the coast of the Savu Sea, proceeding overland to the south to the Noel Besi River, which it then follows south, then east, then south. The border then turns east overland briefly, before turning to the north, utilising various rivers such as the Ekan, Sonau and Bilomi, before proceeding northwards overland to the Savu coast.

=== Eastern section ===
The border between Indonesia and the main part of Timor-Leste starts in the north at the Savu Sea coast, and proceeds south and then east via the Talu river. It then turns south along the Malibacu river, and then west along the Tafara river, then south along the Massin river down to the coast at the Timor Sea.

== History ==
=== Colonization ===
The division of the island of Timor dates to the colonial period. During the 15th–16th centuries both the Netherlands and Portugal began taking an interest in the Spice Islands of modern Indonesia. The Portuguese first landed on Timor in 1512 and established their first settlement in Lifau in western Timor in 1556. The Dutch followed shortly after, but did not establish themselves in the west of the island until 1640 when the Dutch started to occupy the western half of the island as part of its Dutch East Indies colony. In 1642, the Portuguese conquered the island's spiritual centre at Wehale, after which most Timorese rulers (Liurai) recognised Portugal's dominance. Thus, Portugal started to occupy the eastern half of Timor and declared the creation of Portuguese Timor. In 1656, the Dutch conquered the Portuguese base at Kupang. In 1749, an attempted reconquest by the Portuguese failed at the Battle of Penfui, whereupon most rulers in the west signed treaties with the Dutch East India Company. Among them was a certain Jacinto Correa, King of Wewiku-Wehale and Grand Prince of Belu, who also signed the dubious Treaty of Paravicini on behalf of many territories in central Timor. Fortunately for the Portuguese, Wehale was no longer powerful enough to draw the local rulers to the side of the Dutch. Thus the eastern former vassals of Wehale remained under the flag of Portugal, while Wehale itself fell under Dutch rule. The result was a permanent dispute over the boundaries of the spheres of influence of the colonial powers.

=== Negotiations between the colonial powers in the 19th century ===
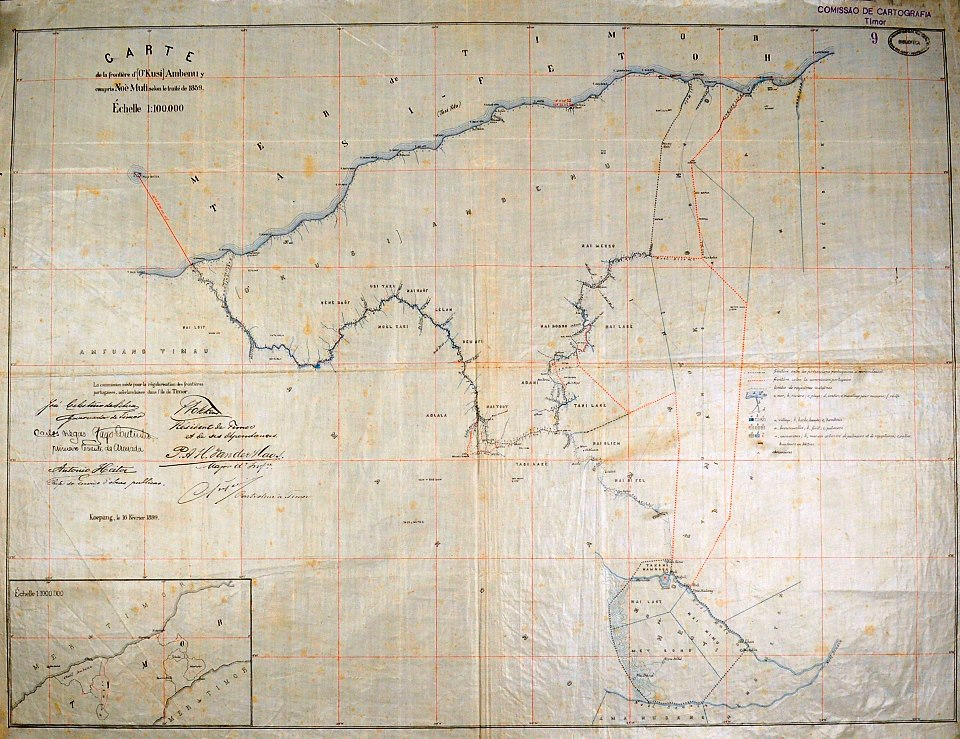
Map of Oe-Cusse Ambeno claimed by the Portuguese (1859)

In 1851, the Portuguese governor José Joaquim Lopes de Lima reached an agreement with the Dutch on the division of the colonies in the Lesser Sunda Islands. However, this was not authorised by Lisbon, which is why the agreements were only confirmed in the Treaty of Lisbon in 1859 after new negotiations from 1854. On 20 April 1859 a treaty was signed (ratified 1860) which formally divided the island between the Netherlands and Portugal, with a border based on existing Timorese states which were assigned to either Portugal or the Netherlands. However, the exact course of the border was still unclear, and with Portuguese Noimuti and Dutch Maucatar, there was also one enclave each of the colonial power without access to the sea on the side of the competitor.

On 10 June 1893, An additional treaty, the Lisbon Convention, was then signed between the governments, with the intention of creating favourable conditions "for the development of civilisation and trade" and for the dissolution of the still existing enclaves (ratified 1894). A commission of experts was to be convened for the new demarcation of borders. If difficulties arose, a mediator was to be called in. The commission visited Timor and came to an agreement on most of the border between 1898 and 1899. The problem with the enclaves of Noimuti and Maucatar remained unresolved. The original reason of the Dutch for this round of negotiations was the desire for a right of first refusal for East Timor. There were rumours that Russia and Germany wanted to establish a coal station in Portuguese Timor, respectively that the colony would be exchanged for the recognition of Portuguese claims in Africa with Germany, France or England. In fact, on 30 August 1898, Germany and Britain agreed in the Angola Treaty on a joint bond for the heavily indebted Portugal, for which the Portuguese colonies were intended as a pledge. In the event of insolvency, Portuguese Timor would have fallen to Germany. As early as 1899, however, the treaty was undermined by the extension of the British guarantee of protection for Portugal and all its possessions.

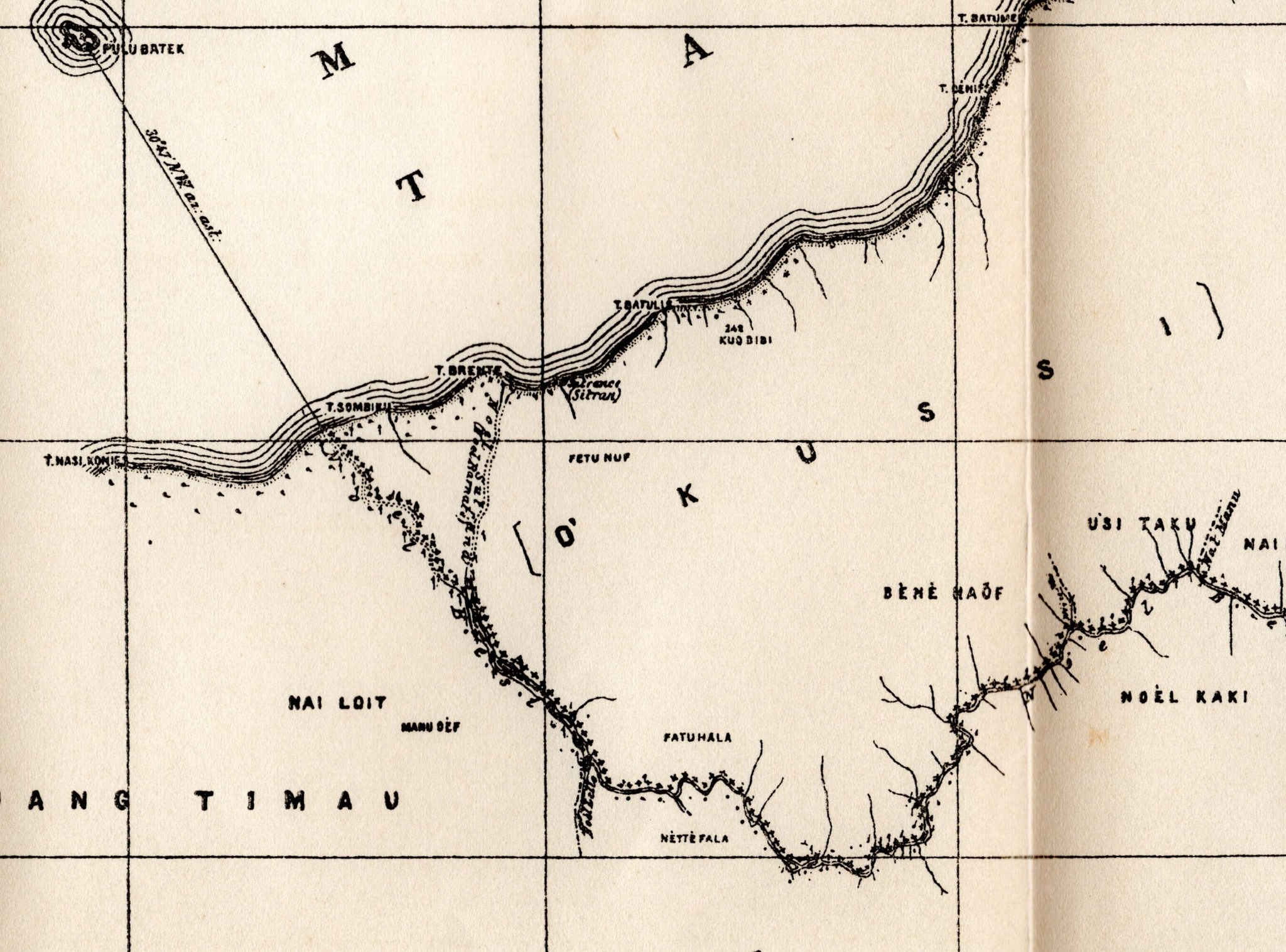
Map of the east of Oe-Cusse Ambeno with Batek Island by the Hague Convention (1904)

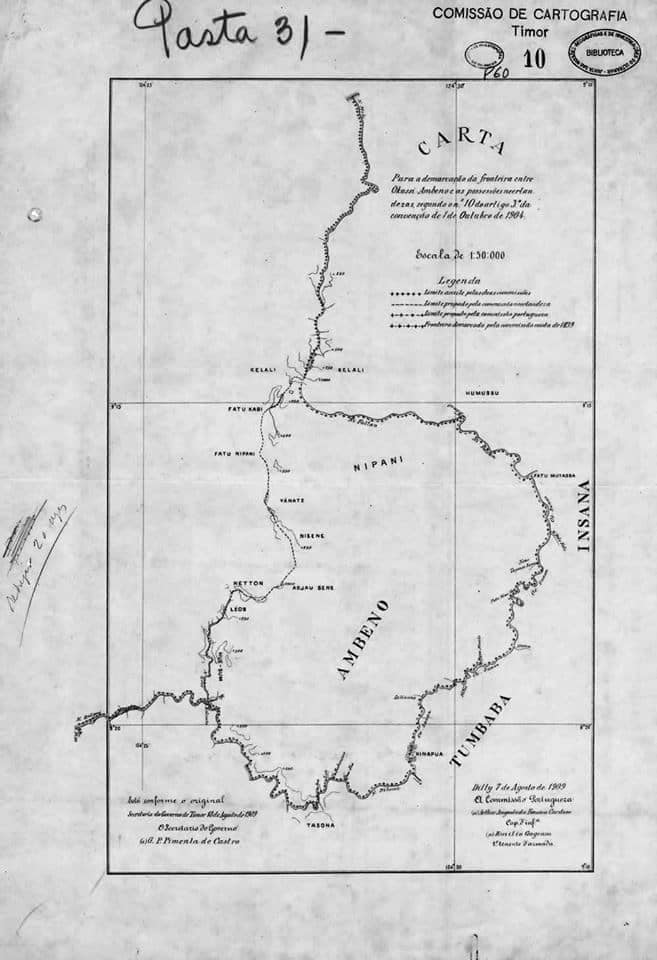
Charted map of the eastern border of Oe-Cusse Ambeno (1909)

In 1897, fighting broke out over Lamaknen between Lamaquitos, which was under Portuguese sovereignty, and Dutch-dominated Lakmaras. In Lakmaras itself, skirmishes between the two colonial forces resulted in casualties. Between 23 June and 3 July 1902, there was another conference in The Hague. It was argued whether Oe-Cusse Ambeno was part of the Lisbon Convention on the exchange of enclaves or not. Portugal objected, saying that the area had a coastal course and therefore did not fall under the definition of an enclave. The Dutch claim to Maucatar had previously been based on their suzerainty over Lakmaras, which created a link to Maucatar. In the meantime, however, Lakmaras had become a subject of the Empire of Lamaquitos in the Portuguese sphere of power and Maucatar would have to fall to Portugal as an enclave according to the previous agreements. On the other hand, the Tahakay Empire (Tahakai, Tafakay, Takay) had in the meantime fallen to the Lamaknen Empire. Tahakay, however, belonged to the Portuguese sphere of influence, Lamaknen to the Dutch. Portugal resisted this loss in the negotiations and therefore now demanded the entire Dutch territories in central Timor. A compromise was reached with the Hague Convention of 1 October 1904. Portugal was to receive the Dutch enclave of Maucatar in exchange for the Portuguese enclave of Noimuti and the border areas of Tahakay, Tamira Ailala (Tamiru Ailala) and Lamaknen. The disputed territories in the east of Oe-Cusse Ambeno were granted to the Dutch. The border was defined from the confluence of the Noèl Bilomi and Oè Sunan, following the Thalweg path of the Oè Sunan, continuing through Nipani and Kelali (Keli) to the source of the Noèl Meto, and following its valley path to its mouth. In addition, the Dutch now secured the right of first refusal for East Timor. Portugal ratified the treaty until 1909, but then a dispute arose over the demarcation of the eastern border of Oe-Cusse Ambeno. In 1910, the Netherlands took advantage of the confused situation after the fall of the Portuguese monarchy to seize Lakmaras again with European and Javanese troops.

=== Problems with surveying ===
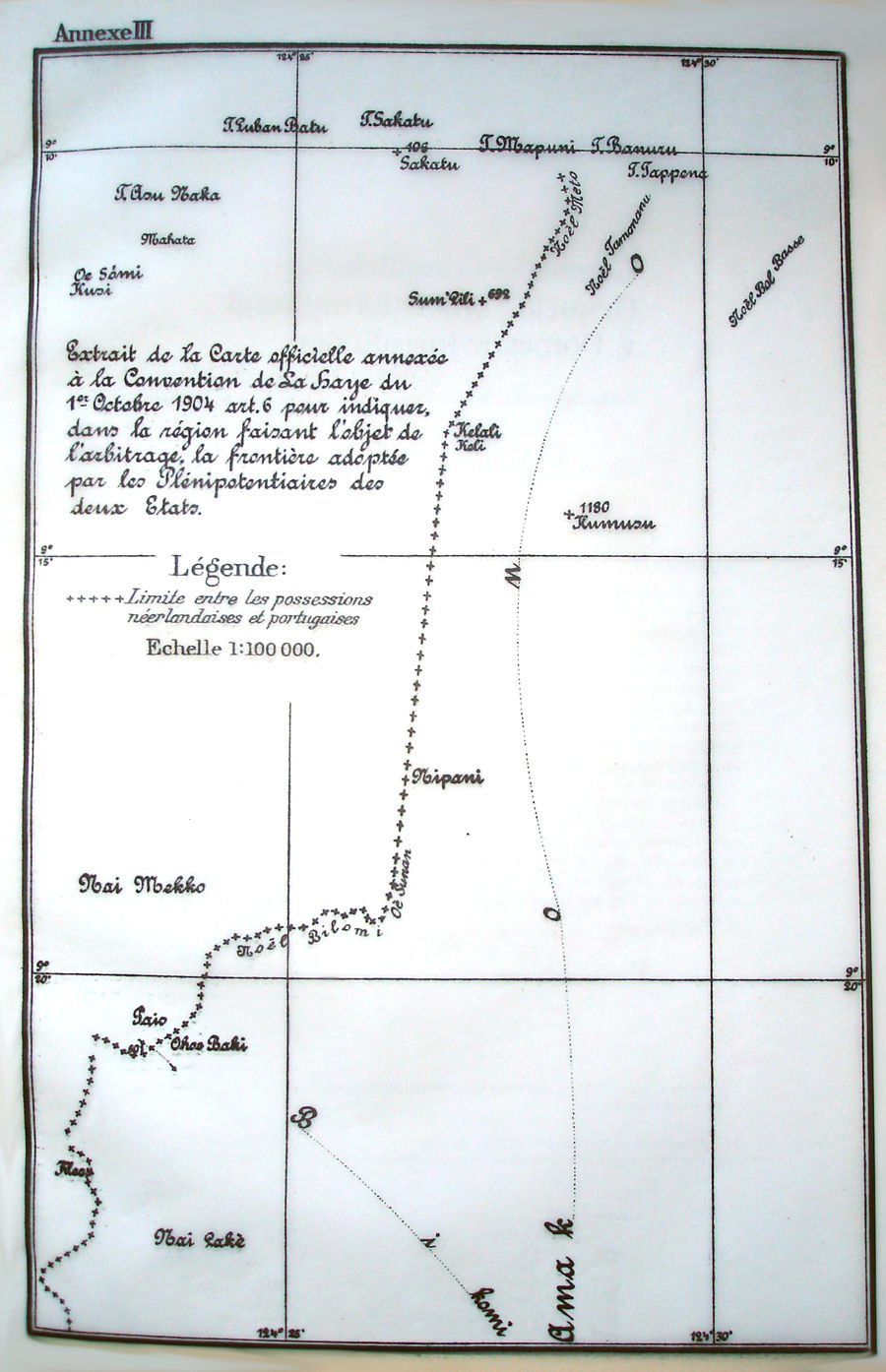
Map of Annex III. Referring to the PCA Award from 25 June 1914 belonging to the boundaries in the island of Timor

Between 1 and 10 June 1909, a commission carried out a survey of the eastern boundary of Oecussi-Ambeno, but could not agree on the correct course and decided to transfer the open questions back to their governments.

The commission had started surveying in the north on the coast and followed the course of the Noèl Meto southwards. Its source served as a measuring point. However, the way to the source was blocked by steep cliffs that could not be overcome, so the surveyors decided to survey only the areas to the north and south. Thus, an area between the source of the Noèl Meto in the north and the course of the Noèl Bilomi in the south was missing. Discrepancies arose first in the north. On the 1904 map (Annex III), the name Kelali was found with Keli in brackets. The Dutch assigned this mark to the summit of Mount Kelali. This lies to the west of the Noèl Meto between two pointed rocks and was given by the inhabitants of the Dutch Tumbaba as the border to the Portuguese Ambeno. Instead, the Portuguese asked to follow the valley paths east of it.

In the southern part, the commission investigated the demarcation along the course of the Nono Nisi (Nise) on 17 June 1909, then further along the course of the Noèl Bilomi, finally arriving at the point where the 1899 expedition had finished its work. The point was marked on the 1904 map as the confluence of the Noèl Bilomi and the Oè Sunan. The present commission found two northern tributaries here, but neither of them had the name Oè Sunan. The Dutch explained this by saying that the area between the tributaries was called Sunan and that there was actually no tributary named Oè Sunan, although the confluence was the starting point of the boundary demarcation on the 1899 and 1904 maps. The Portuguese noted that there was a river further east called Oè Sunan or Oil Sunan, which was not a tributary of the Noèl Bilomi, but whose source was in the "very close to the Noèl Bilomi". Finally, the commission agreed that there is no tributary called Oè Sunan on the Noèl Bilomi, but that the river changes its name. The Portuguese stressed that this meant that the Noèl Bilomi still existed.

The Dutch delegation explained that the Bilomi had changed names in this region. "Yes, the river exists," the Portuguese replied, "but, according to indigenous tradition, it bears the name of the area it is crossing". Finally, the Portuguese delegation added, not very far from the north bank of the Bilomis stands Mount Kinapua. On its opposite slope, the Oè Sunan flows towards the north. It was only necessary to follow this river course, then up the Noi Fulan river to its source and finally connect it with the source of the Noèl Meto, which had already been recognised by the joint commission.

However, the Dutch felt that there was no point in pursuing the survey of this river, as both Mount Kinapua and the border area that would be created under the Portuguese proposal were outside the territory contested in 1899. Mount Tasonal appears on the 1899 map on the farthest eastern boundary of the then Portuguese claims, which were rejected by the 1904 Agreement. In this respect, a border area going even further east is out of the question. There were numerous areas of the boundary which the two sides were unable to come to agreement on, prompting a further conference held at The Hague in 1902. A treaty was subsequently signed on 1 October 1904 (ratified 1908) which created the modern boundary, removing a number of enclaves whilst leaving the exclave of Oecusse as part of Portuguese Timor.

However, whilst demarcating the boundary on the ground in 1909, the two sides were unable to agree to the alignment of the eastern section of the Oecusse boundary. The Joint Commission interrupted its work here and the question, meanwhile taken over by the diplomatic services, caused endless correspondence between the cabinets in The Hague and Lisbon. Out of this correspondence came the 1913 Convention, which gave an arbitrator the right to decide, according to the "facts supplied by the two parties" and "on the basis of general fundamental rights, how the boundary from the Noèl Bilomi to the source of the Noèl Metos, in accordance with Article 3, Number 10 of the Den Hagen Agreement of 1 October 1904... should run."

As the governments could not agree, it was decided to refer the matter Permanent Court of Arbitration in 1913.

=== Court of Arbitration in The Hague ===
==== The Portuguese point of view ====
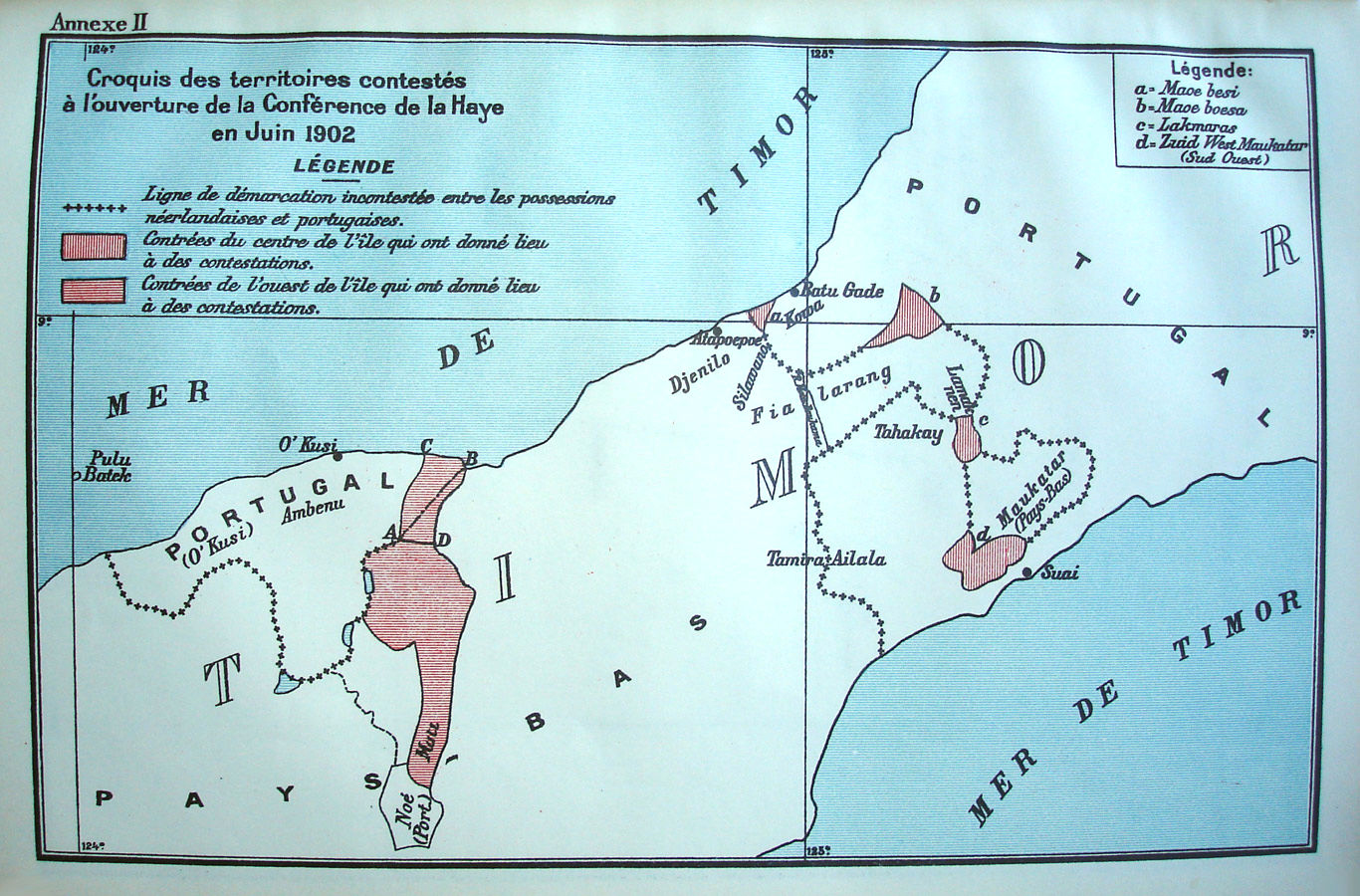
Annex II also shows claims made by the Portuguese. It was not accepted by the Dutch

The Portuguese government made the following points:

1. The tributary to the Noèl Bilomi called Oè Sunan, which was at the point where the work was stopped in 1899, or which is indicated in the contract and map of 1904, does not exist.
2. Instead, further east there is a river called Oè Sunan, which is not a tributary of the Noèl Bilomi, but has its source near its north loop at Mount Kinapua. The mountain and the Oè Sunan are considered by many local rulers to be the border point between the Portuguese Ambeno and the Dutch territories of Tumbaba and Amakono. A stream flows from Kinapua towards Noèl Bilomi, so the peak can serve as a link between the two watercourses.
3. according to the indigenous rulers, the Ambeno border runs east along the Oè Sunan and north along the Ni Fullan river. To the west of the Kelali and Netton mountains lies Oecussi, which indisputably belongs to Portugal. A map by a private citizen published in Batavia even refers to the entire area claimed by the Netherlands as Ambeno.
4. The treaty of 1859 is based on the principle that the native kingdoms should not be divided. Ambeno, however, will be divided with the Dutch proposed border demarcation and the inhabitants will be deprived of their pastures and fields which would then be in Dutch territory.
5. there is no evidence that the boundary to be demarcated should necessarily start at the point where the demarcation work was suspended in 1899 due to hostilities between the natives and where the maps show the confluence of the Bilomi and Oè Sunan rivers, but which is not at that location. There are two streams at this place, the Kamboun and the Nono-Offi. Why follow the course of the Kamboun to the north instead of the Nono-Offi, which comes from the northeast and joins the Bilomi at this point?
6. In the view of the Portuguese government, it was only desirable to give the Boundary Commissioners a sketch, using the 1899 and 1904 maps, for the purpose of fixing ideas, and as a vague and simple indication of what was to be settled later.
7. The real intention of the signatories to the 1904 Treaty was to follow the course of the Oè Sunan where it actually lies, that is, much further east. In terms of the treaty, therefore, nothing prevents the Bilomi from rising to the point closest to the source of the true Oè Sunan, a source so close to the course of the Bilomi that it is almost a tributary.
8. the line proposed by the Netherlands to "cross as far as possible Nipani and Kelali (Keli)" according to the 1904 treaty does not cross Nipani but only touches the Fatu Nipani, i.e. the western end of the Nipani. Therefore, it does not correspond to the 1904 plan.
9. the line proposed by the Netherlands is not a natural boundary, while the line proposed by Portugal follows watercourses for almost its entire length.

==== The Dutch point of view ====
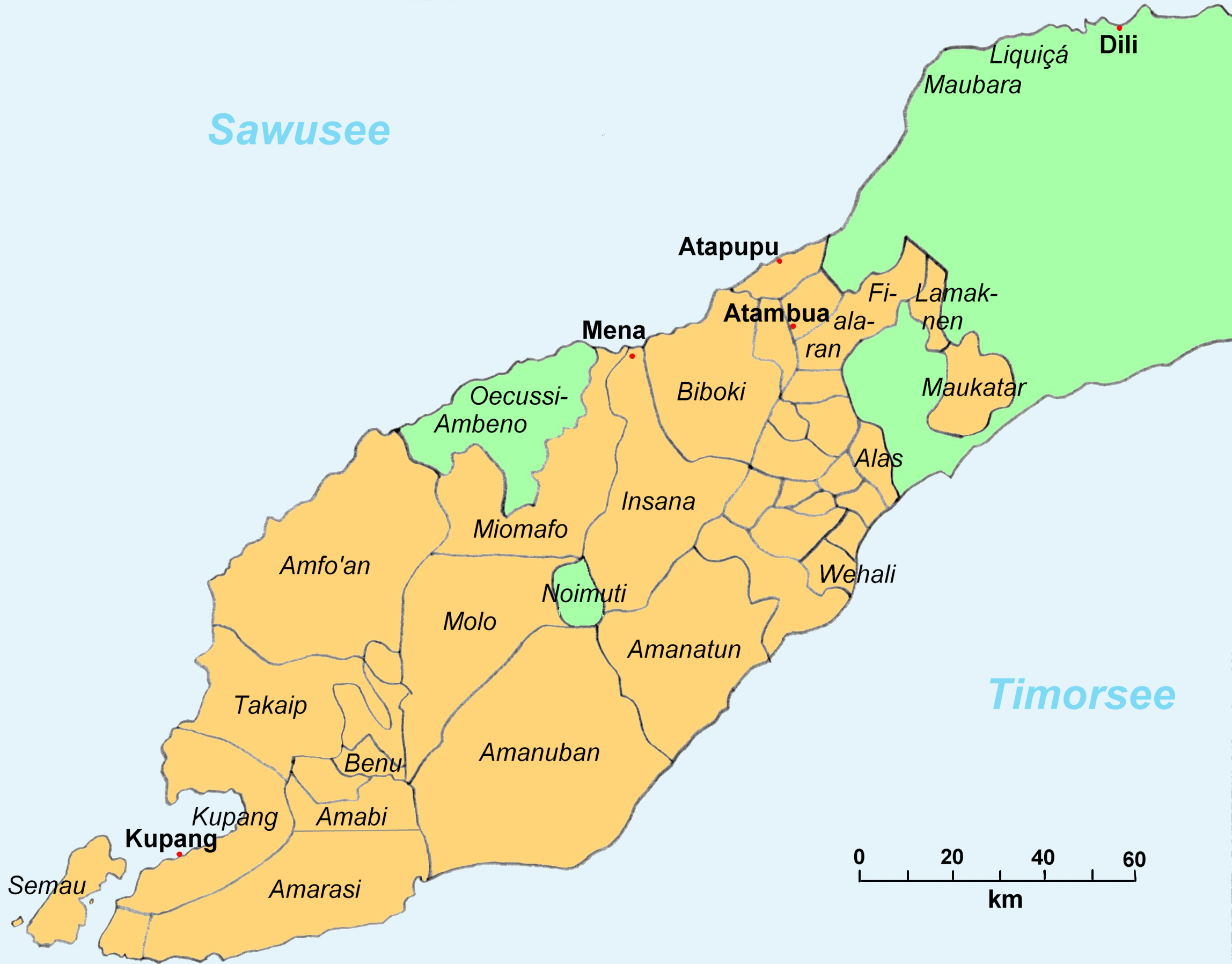
Border of East Timor according to the Dutch. It was not accepted by Portugal

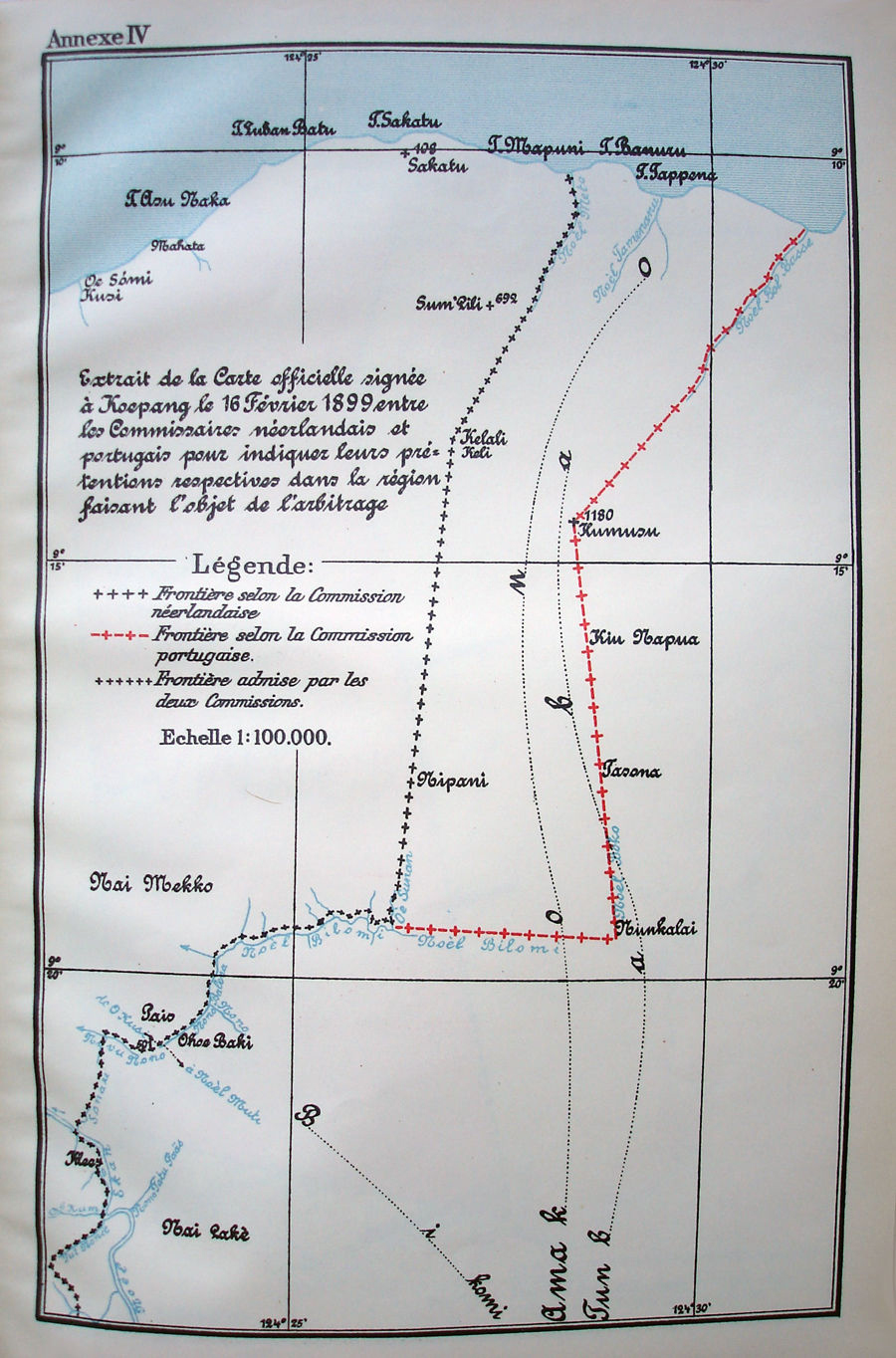
Annex IV

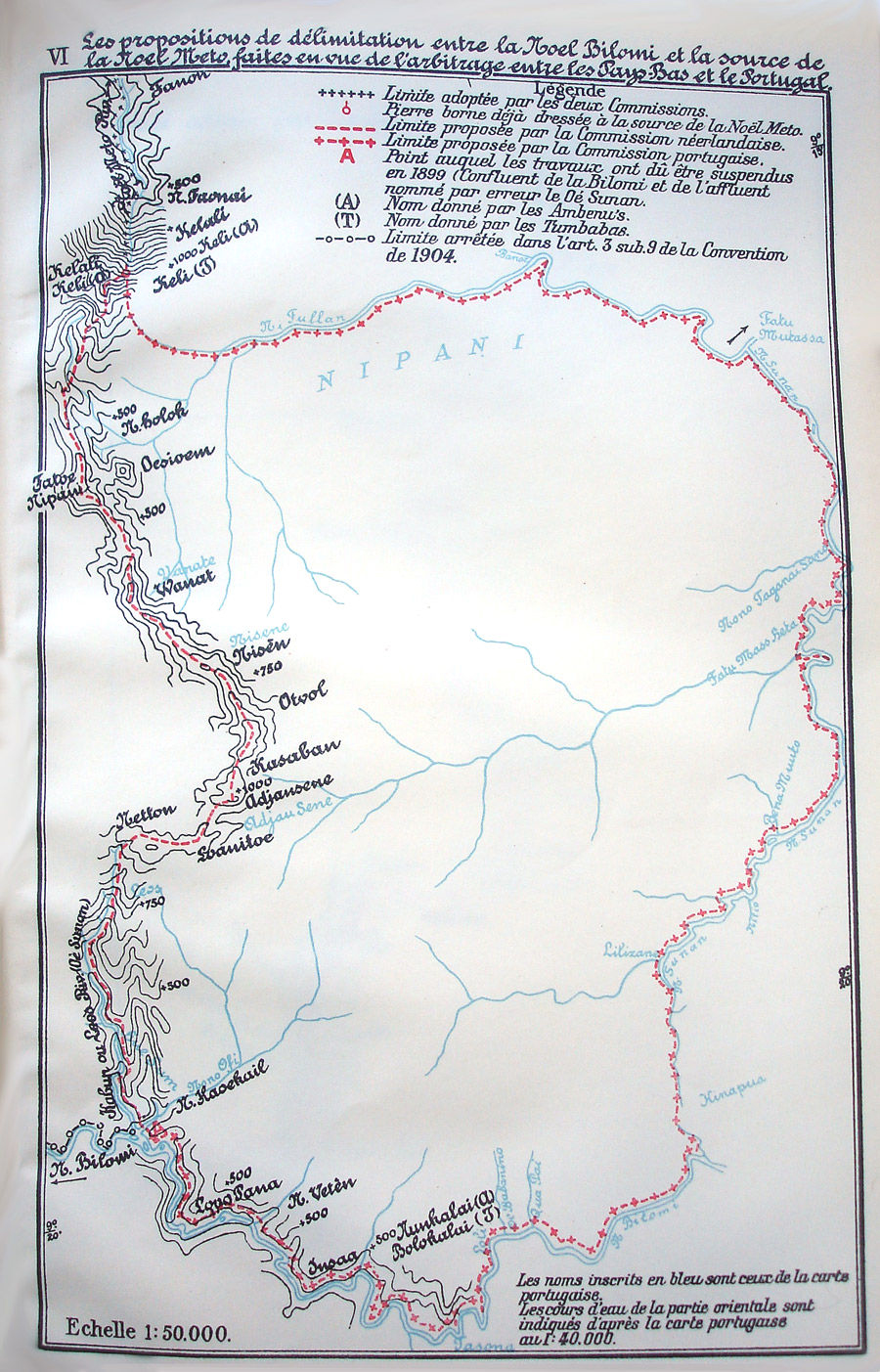
Annex VI

The main arguments of the government of the Netherlands can be summarized as follows:

1. The 1859 Treaty does not mandate that native territories should not be partitioned or parceled out. On the contrary, it assigned to Portugal the state of Ambeno "wherever the Portuguese flag is set there", but does not thereby prohibit the partition of an indigenous state, but calls for the partition of the state of Ambeno precisely by saying: "The Netherlands cede to Portugal ... that part of the state of Ambenu or Ambeno which for several years has flown the Portuguese flag."
2. There is no uncertainty as to the place where the border commissioners ceased in 1899. This point served as the basis for the 1902 negotiations and was marked on the map (Annex III) signed by the negotiating parties at that time to be attached to the draft treaty. This 1902 draft became the 1904 Treaty. From this point, and from no other point, begins the line AC, which was recognised in 1902 as a duly constituted boundary (Map Annex I). This line AC extends northwards from this point to the source of the river Noèl Meto, and the boundary was then to follow this watercourse to its mouth in the sea to the north.
3. The location of the source of the Noèl Meto was recognised differently in 1909: A marker was placed there by mutual agreement. The discussion concerned only the elevation between this source and point A, which was at the place where the commissioners stopped in 1899.
4. On the official map of 1899 (Appendix IV), as on the official map of 1904 (Appendix III), a tributary to which the name Oè Sunan was given by a mistake which the Netherlands do not dispute, is shown as coming from the north to the point in question. This tributary, which in reality bears the name of Kabun among the Tumbabas and that of Lèos among the Ambenos, is entirely in accordance with the intention of the contracting parties, which was that a tributary coming from the north should take the direction of AC from point A. The mistake in the name has less significance, since the watercourses in this region very often have several names or change their names or bear the name of the country they cross: the region east of the Kabun or Lèos (the Oè Sunan of 1904) has the name Hue Son, according to the Portuguese government, a similar sound, and the name Sunan according to the Dutch commissioners, which could explain the mistake of the commissioners.
5. The native rulers of Amakono (Dutch) declared (Joint Commission meeting of 21 February 1899) that their land comprised the entire region lying between Oè Sunan, Nipani, Kelali-Keli and Noèl Meto (to the west), the Sea of Timor (to the north), the Noèl Boll Bass, the Humusu and Kin Napua mountains (to the east), Tasona, the Noèl Boho and the Noèl Bilomi (to the south). The western boundary described in 1899 between the Dutch Amakono and the Portuguese Ambeno is that established by the 1904 Treaty. The Oè Sunan that appears there can only be the watercourse that was mistakenly entered in the official maps of 1899 and 1904 by mutual agreement, i.e. a watercourse to the west of the disputed territory and not the alleged Oè Sunan to which Portugal now refers and which lies on the eastern border of the disputed territory. The 1904 Treaty assigned this disputed territory to the Netherlands. The border is therefore supposed to be on the watercourse to the west, whatever it is called.
6. The proof that Portugal in 1899 and 1904 could not have taken into account the eastern stream, to which it now gives the name of Oè Sunan, is the fact that its Commissioners in the meeting of 21. February 1899 proposed as a boundary a line beginning at the point where the stream now called Oè Sunan joins the Bilomi, and then following the Noèl Bilomi eastwards to Nunkalaï (then crossing Tasona and going north from Kin Napua to Humusu and to the source of the Noèl Boll Bass, the course of which would have served as the boundary to its mouth at sea). This Portuguese proposal of 1899 would be incomprehensible if it were a different river from the one that appears on the official maps of 1899 and 1904 under the name Oè Sunan. How could it be a different Oè Sunan river that lies to the east of Nunkalaï, since the Nunkalaï in fact lies to the west and not to the east of this new Oè Sunan discovered by the Portuguese?
7. Two recent investigations launched by the Dutch authorities on Timor also confirmed that no river named Oè Sunan rises on Mount Kinapua. The stream, which rises on the northern slope at some distance from the summit, is named Poeamesse and Noilpolan and flows into the Noèl Manama, the Ni Fullan of the Portuguese maps, at Fatoe Metassa (the Fatu Mutassa of the Portuguese).
8. Although the line proposed by the Netherlands does not cross the territory of Nipani, the 1904 Treaty does not require this. It provides that the line connecting the source of the Oè Sunan and the source of the Noèl Meto should cross "Nipani as far as possible". Since the area to be delimited was unexplored, the words "as far as possible" were justified. In fact, the line proposed by the Netherlands, if it crosses the Nipani area at all, crosses the western extremity called Fatu Nipani. Now, according to statements recorded in the process of demarcation on 21 February 1899, the natives designated the Oè Sunan, Nipani, Kelali and the Noèl Meto as the eastern boundary of Oe-Cusse Ambeno (Portuguese) and the western boundary of Amakono (Dutch). They thought of the rocky Fatu Nipani, as the western end of Nipani.
9. The border proposed by the Dutch is a natural border formed by a mountain range that completely separates the watercourses. In the years from 1902 to 1904, it was never prescribed or recommended to follow watercourses alone for demarcation. And on the northern boundary of Oe-Cusse Ambeno, especially where the boundary line runs from the catchment of one river to the other, arrangements were made at many places.
10. It will also be sufficient to mark the boundary on the ridge line proposed by the Netherlands for a few metres.
11. The survey that Portugal is submitting itself calls for surveys in the region around Mount Kinapua, between the Bilomi and the alleged new Oè Sunan and elsewhere in the region, between the source of the Noèl Meto and the stream to which the Portuguese have given the name Ni-Fullan, that is, at both ends of the Portuguese surveys.
12. The boundary line that Portugal proposes today repeats its claims of 1899 and 1902 in this region. It is now undisputed that by adopting the A C line at the 1902 Conference and incorporating it into the 1904 Treaty, Portugal ceded the territory to which it had previously laid claim. Accordingly, it cannot renew its claim to the same territory today.

==== The Arbitration ====
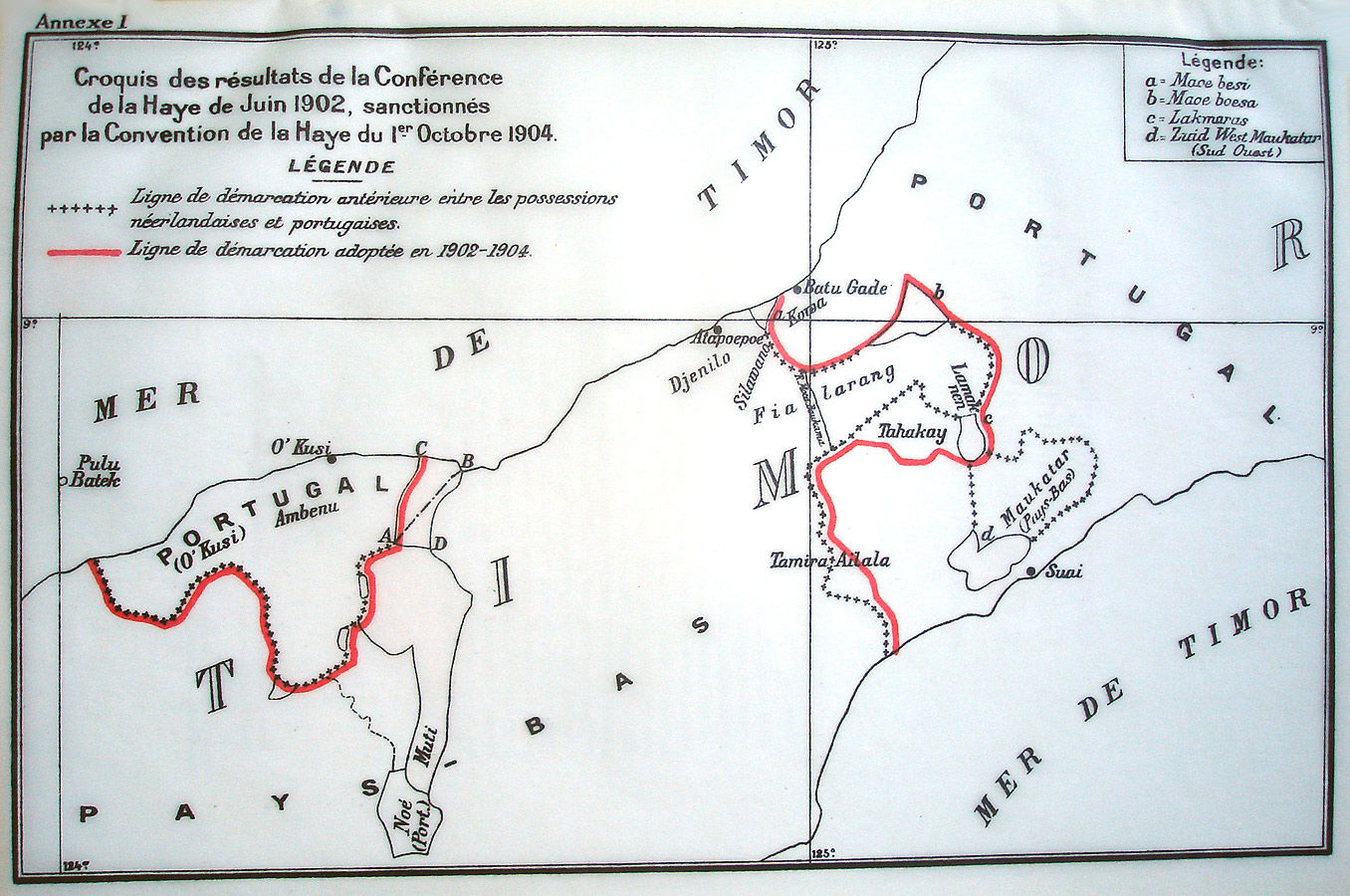
Card Annex I from the series on the award of the Permanent Court of Arbitration of 25 June 1914

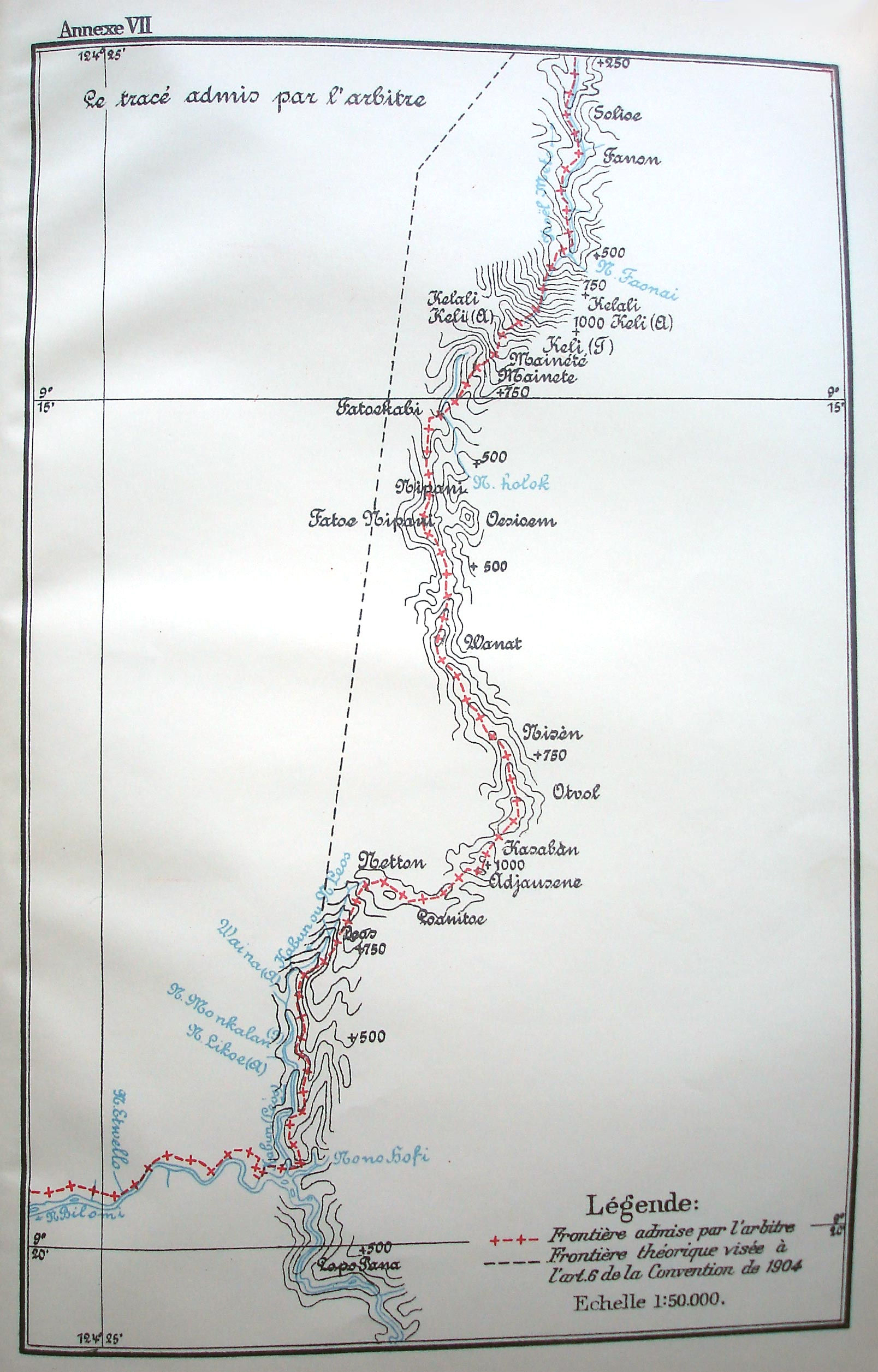
Annex VII

Article 3, number 10, of the Convention concluded at The Hague, October 1, 1904, concerning the delimitation of Dutch and Portuguese possessions in the Island of Timor, ought to be interpreted in conformity with the conclusions of the Royal Government of the Netherlands as to the boundary from the Noèl Bilomi as far as the source of the Noel Meto; consequently there will be a survey of that part of the frontier on the basis of the map at 1/50,000 annexed under No. IV of the first Memorial deposited with the arbitrator by the Dutch Government. A reproduction of this map signed by the arbitrator is appended as annex VII to the present award of which it shall be an integral part.

Expenses, fixed at 2,000 francs, have been deducted from the sum of 4,000 francs placed in the hands of the arbitrator in execution of art. 8 of the compromis of April 3, 1913; the remainder, or 2,000 francs, will be remitted in equal shares to the two Parties and against receipt, at the time of the notification of the award.

Seal of the Permanent Court of Arbitration Done in triplicate of which one copy shall be delivered, against receipt by the Secretary General of the International Bureau of the Permanent Court of Arbitration at The Hague, to His Excellency the Minister of Foreign Affairs of the Netherlands to serve as notification to the Royal Government of the Netherlands, and of which the second shall be delivered on the same day and in the same manner to His Excellency the Envoy Extraordinary and Minister Plenipotentiary of the Portuguese Republic to H.M. the Queen of the Netherlands, to serve as notification to the Government of the Portuguese Republic. The third shall be deposited in the archives of the International Bureau of the Permanent Court of Arbitration.

Paris, June 25, 1914.

— The Hague, On the boundaries in the Island of Timor, Netherlands v. Portugal

The Swiss judge Charles Édouard Lardy of the Permanent Court of Arbitration in The Hague thus ended a centuries-old dispute in favour of the Netherlands on 26 June 1914. In 1915 various overland sections of the boundary were demarcated on the ground by erecting boundary posts.

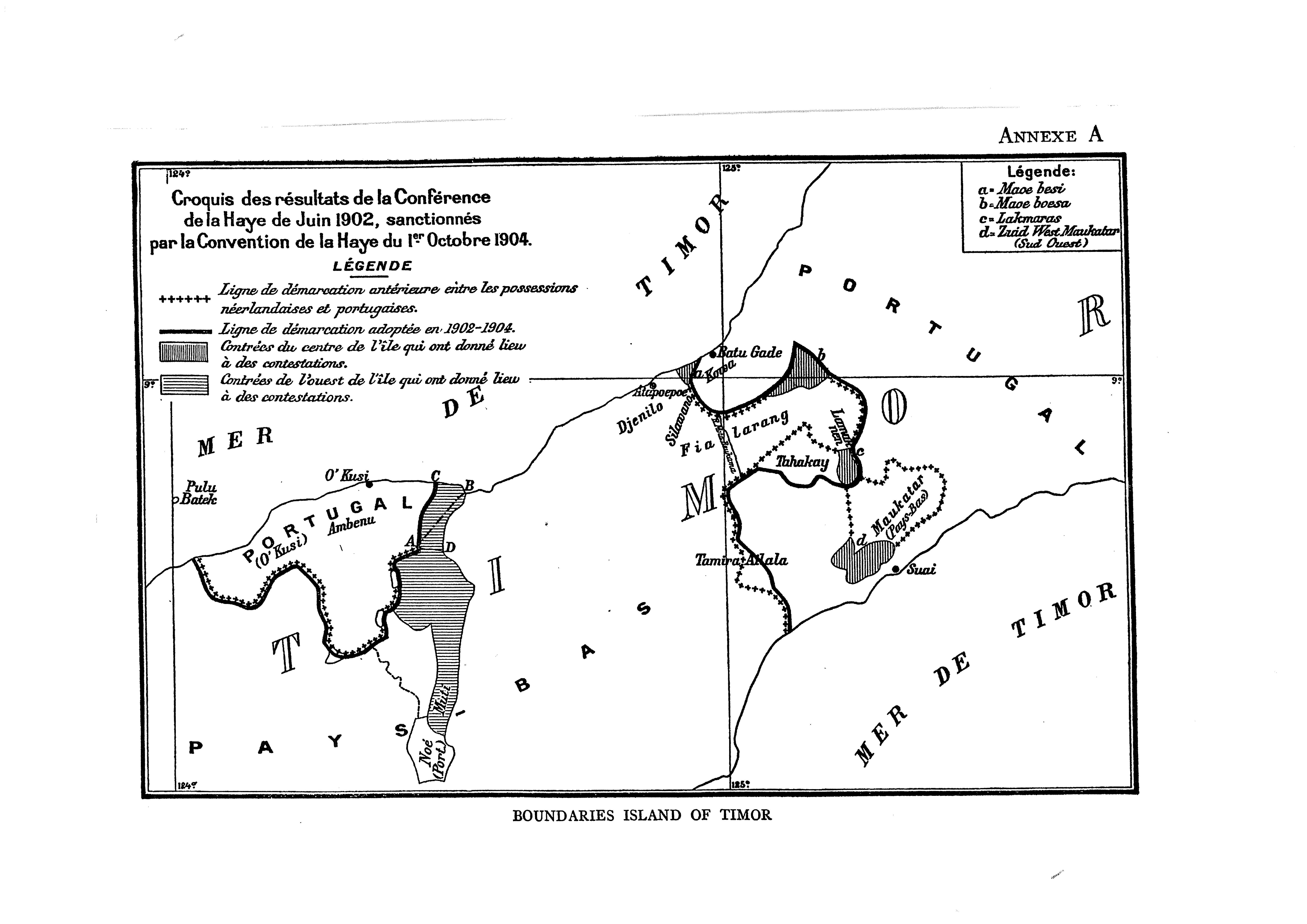
Annex A. For simplicity and clarity, some maps have been combined.

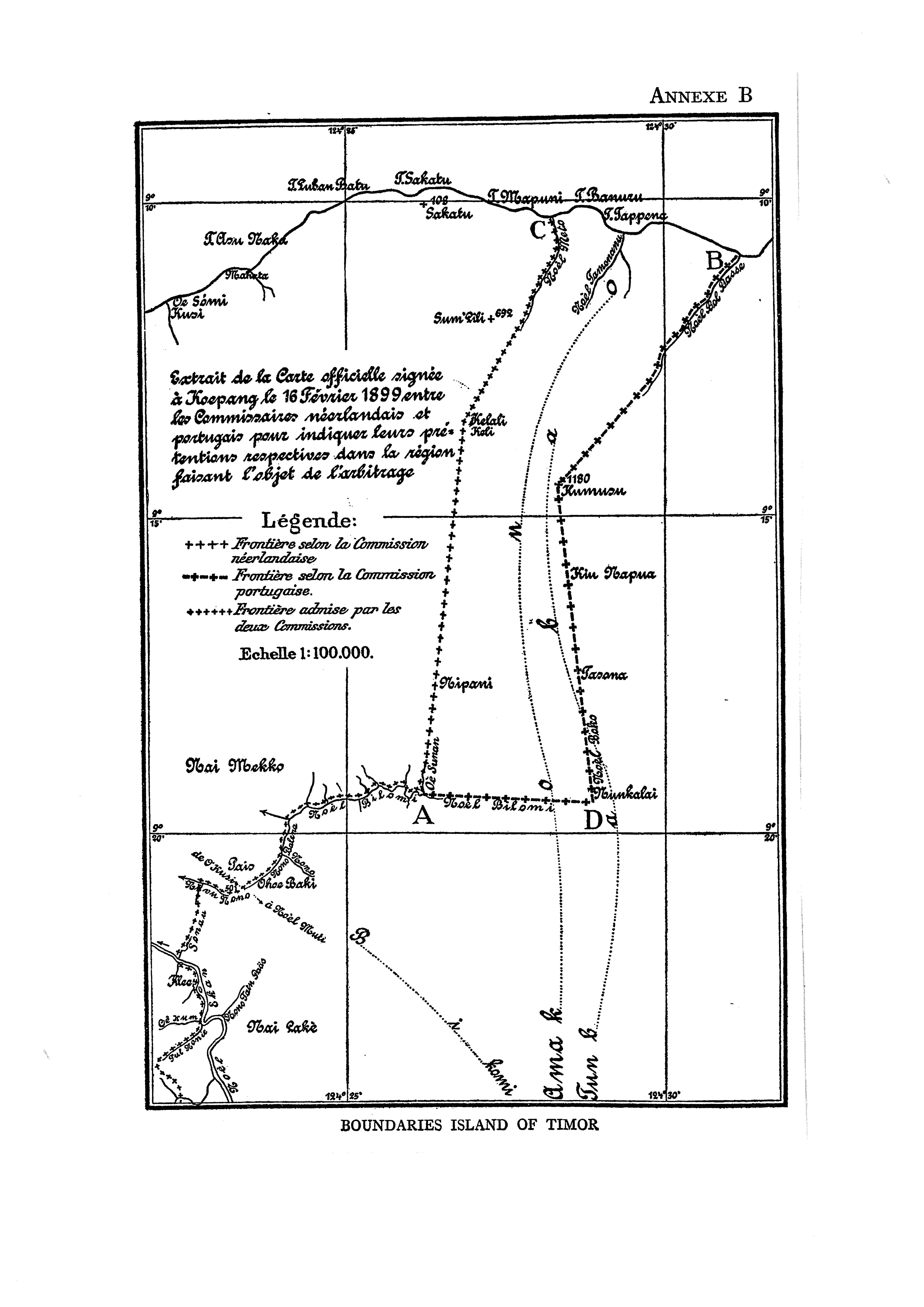
Annex B. Combines the maps of 1899 and 1904, in which the A and C lines coincided.

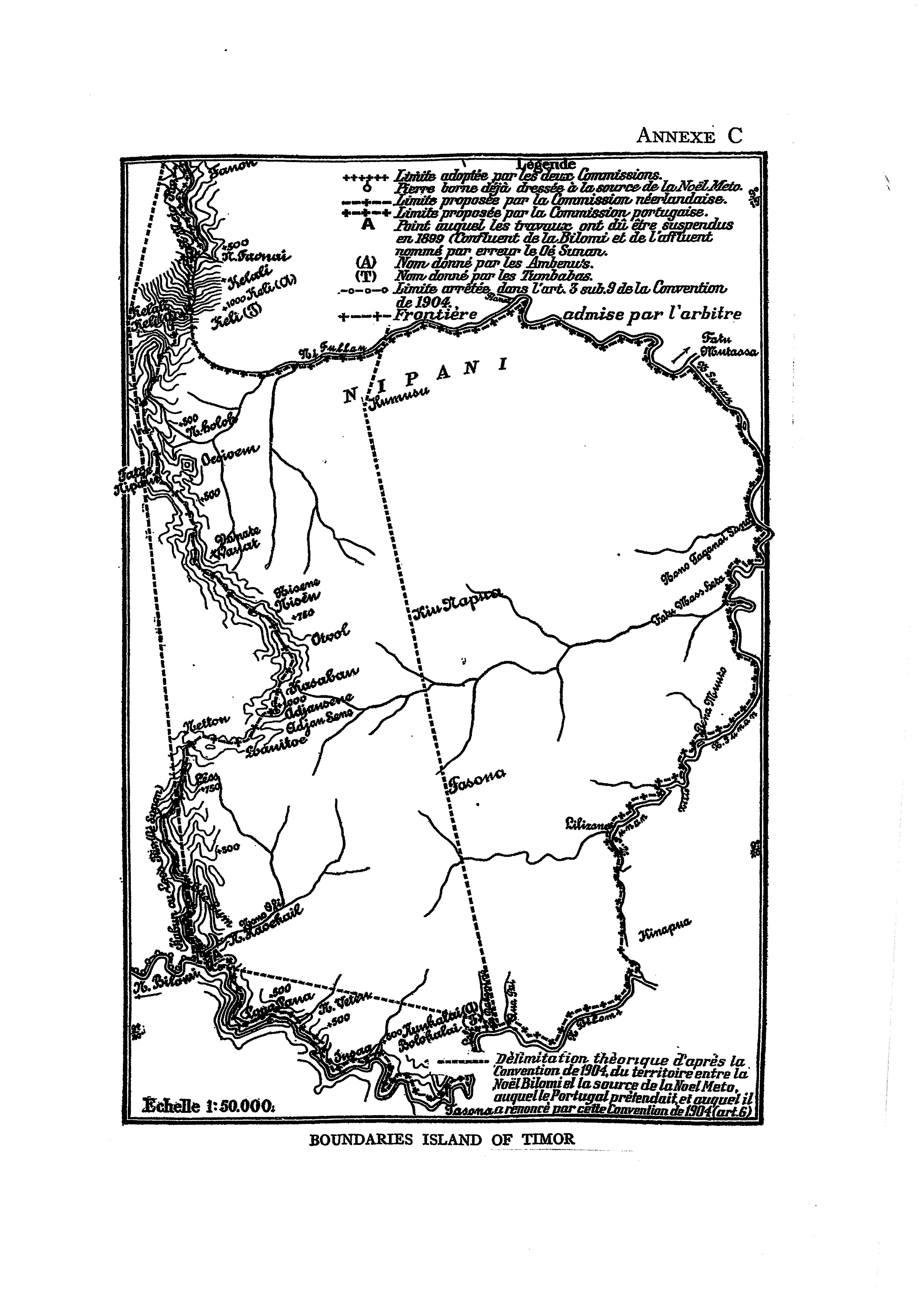
Annex C

=== Decolonization ===
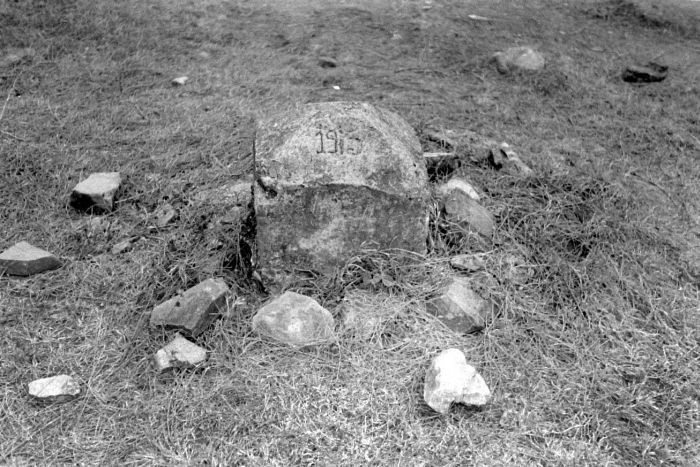
Boundary stone from 1915 between West Timor and Oecusse

In 1949, the Dutch possessions on and around Timor became independent as part of Indonesia, while Portuguese Timor initially remained an overseas province. It was only after the Carnation Revolution of 1974, which removed the dictatorship of Marcello Caetano, that Portugal began to decolonise its possessions. In East Timor, a civil war broke out between the two largest parties, which Indonesia used to occupy the border area. Under the threat of total invasion, the victorious FRETILIN declared the independence of the Democratic Republic of East Timor on 28 November 1975, but only nine days later Indonesia openly began to annex and occupy East Timor, reforming it under the province of Timor Timur (which uses the same border prior to the invasion without any changes).

The following 24 years of occupation and guerrilla warfare cost the lives of nearly 200,000 people. Finally, in 1999, under pressure from the international community, a referendum was held in which the population had the choice between independence and belonging to Indonesia as an autonomous province. 78.5% opted for independence. East Timor came under UN administration and was finally granted independence on 20 May 2002 as Timor-Leste.

== Current situation ==
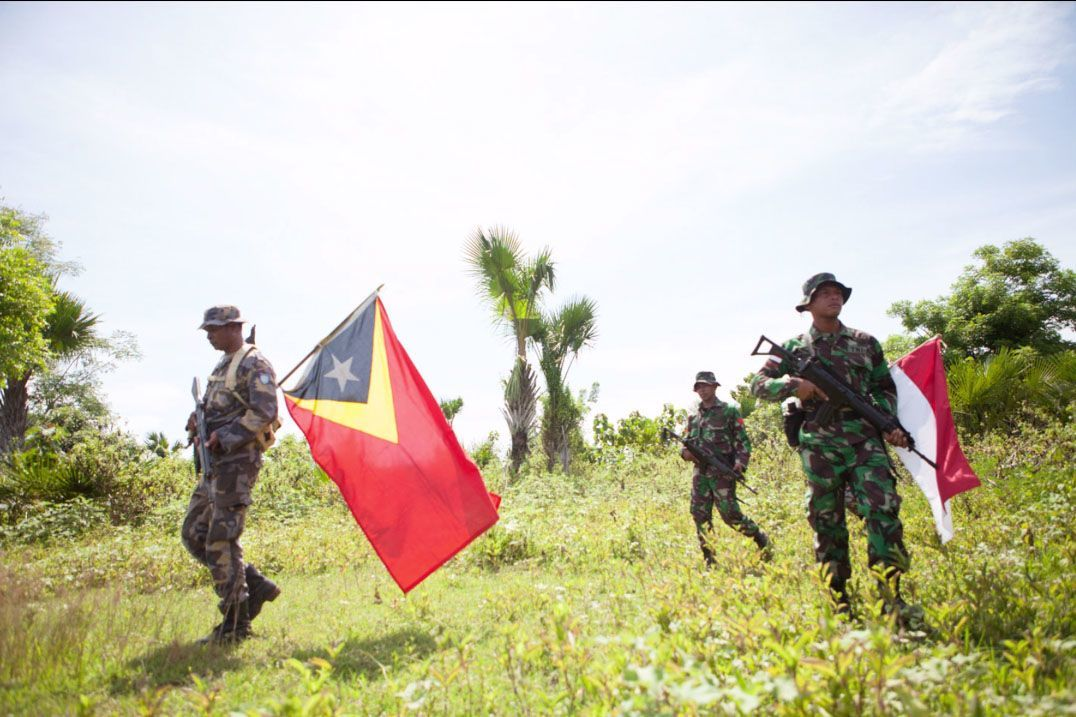
East Timorese and Indonesians on joint border patrol

As late as 2001, members of the Indonesian military warned that East Timor's independence could cause secessionist movements in West Timor. East Timorese separatists and irredentists have received local support in West Timor, including from the local Catholic diocese of Atambua. The aim is to unite the two parts of the island into an independent "Greater Timor". In 2005, a local commission again warned against a "Great Timor grouping" in West Timor. However, such a grouping did not appear in the general public and neither the government nor the major parties in East and West Timor pursue such a policy. The current land border between Timor-Leste and Indonesia is 268.8 km long. 149.1 km of this is the border between the main territory of Timor-Leste and its western neighbour, the rest is the border around the East Timorese exclave of Oe-Cusse Ambeno. In order to agree on the course of the border, the Dutch-Portuguese border demarcation was used as a guideline, in accordance with the legal principle "Uti possidetis".

=== Border agreements and disputes ===
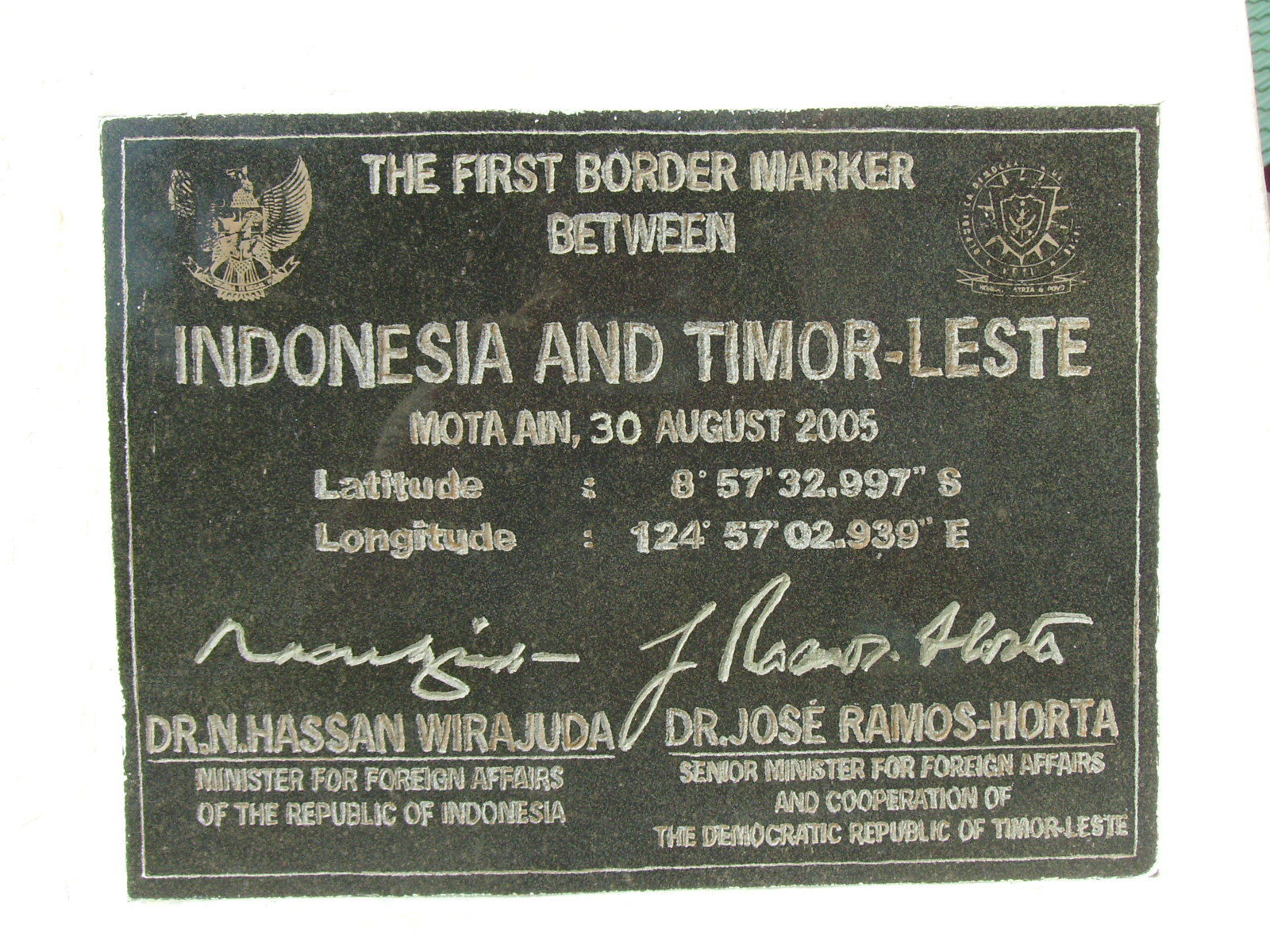
The first border monument between Indonesia and Timor-Leste is in Motaain, Belu Regency.

Border negotiations have been conducted by Indonesia since 2001 with the UN-formed transitional government in East Timor (UNTAET), before being continued with the official government of Timor-Leste since 2002 through the Joint Border Committee (JBC). The initial result was the 2005 Interim Agreement, which established a land boundary between Indonesia and Timor-Leste of 268.8 kilometers with 907 coordinate points. However, the agreement had only resolved about 96% of the land border issues. The remaining 4% covering the Noel Besi-Citrana, Bidjael Sunan-Oben, and Dilumil-Memo areas had formerly not been agreed upon due to differences in border interpretation between the two countries.

==== Batek Island ====
Since 8 April 2005, 97% of the border had been defined with 907 coordinate points. Still in dispute was the affiliation of the small uninhabited island of Batek Island (Fatu Sinai), 37 hectares between the East Timorese village of Memo (Suco Tapo/Memo) and the Indonesian Dilumil (Lamaknen district, Belu Regency), where it was not possible to agree on the location of the river median of the Mathiaca (Malibaca) over a length of 2.2 km and areas around the exclave of Oe-Cusse Ambeno (Área Cruz with 142.7 hectares in Passabe, Citrana triangle in Nitibe) as well as the exact modalities of a corridor from Oe-Cusse Ambeno to the main state territory. Since 2010, there has been a special pass for traffic in the border area. In Naktuka, however, there have been repeated attacks by Indonesian soldiers on the local population since the end of 2009. On 21 June 2013, the dispute over the area near Dilumil/Memo was settled.

The claims to the island of Batek Island had allegedly been abandoned by Timor-Leste at this point. The two territories on the border of the Oe-Cusse Ambeno exclave remained as points of contention. On 23 July 2019, following a meeting between Timor-Leste's chief negotiator Xanana Gusmão and Wiranto, Indonesia's Coordinating Minister for Political, Legal and Security Affairs, it was stated that agreement had now been reached on the course of the country's border. Negotiations on maritime borders, which had been ongoing since 2015, continued. On 21 January 2022, Gusmão reported to the Foreign Affairs, Defence and Security Commission of the National Parliament on the status of the negotiations. Now Naktuka and Batek Island were again part of the negotiations. Negotiations on maritime borders from Batugade to Atauro and from Atauro to Jaco were also ongoing.

==== Sunan-Oben and Dilumil-Memo ====
In 2013, Indonesia and Timor-Leste agreed to divide the Dilumil-Memo region evenly by the use of a median line and was reclarified in the 2005 agreement. Meanwhile, the proposed border in Sunan-Oben faced staunch opposition from Indonesian locals, who argued that, had it been accepted, most of the land would fall on the East Timorese side of the border.

In 2017, Both countries had formed an organization, the Senior Official Consultation (or known as the SOC), in the task of discussing the technical details of resolving border issues. The SOC team managed to reach an agreement in principle in 2019, including on the Subina-Oben boundaries, the determination of end points and the drawing of new lines for Bidjael Sunan–Oben, and the use of a simple median line to bisect Noel Besi–Citrana. Finally ending the dispute. However, after the Timor-Leste delegation brought home the results of the agreement, there was rejection from parliament, especially regarding the land boundary of the Noel Besi-Citrana region, also known as Naktuka. This then resulted in the Naktuka controversy.

==== Naktuka controversy ====
Nakuta is located in Noel Besi-Citrana, between Kupang Regency and Oecusse District consisting of 1,069 hectares of land.

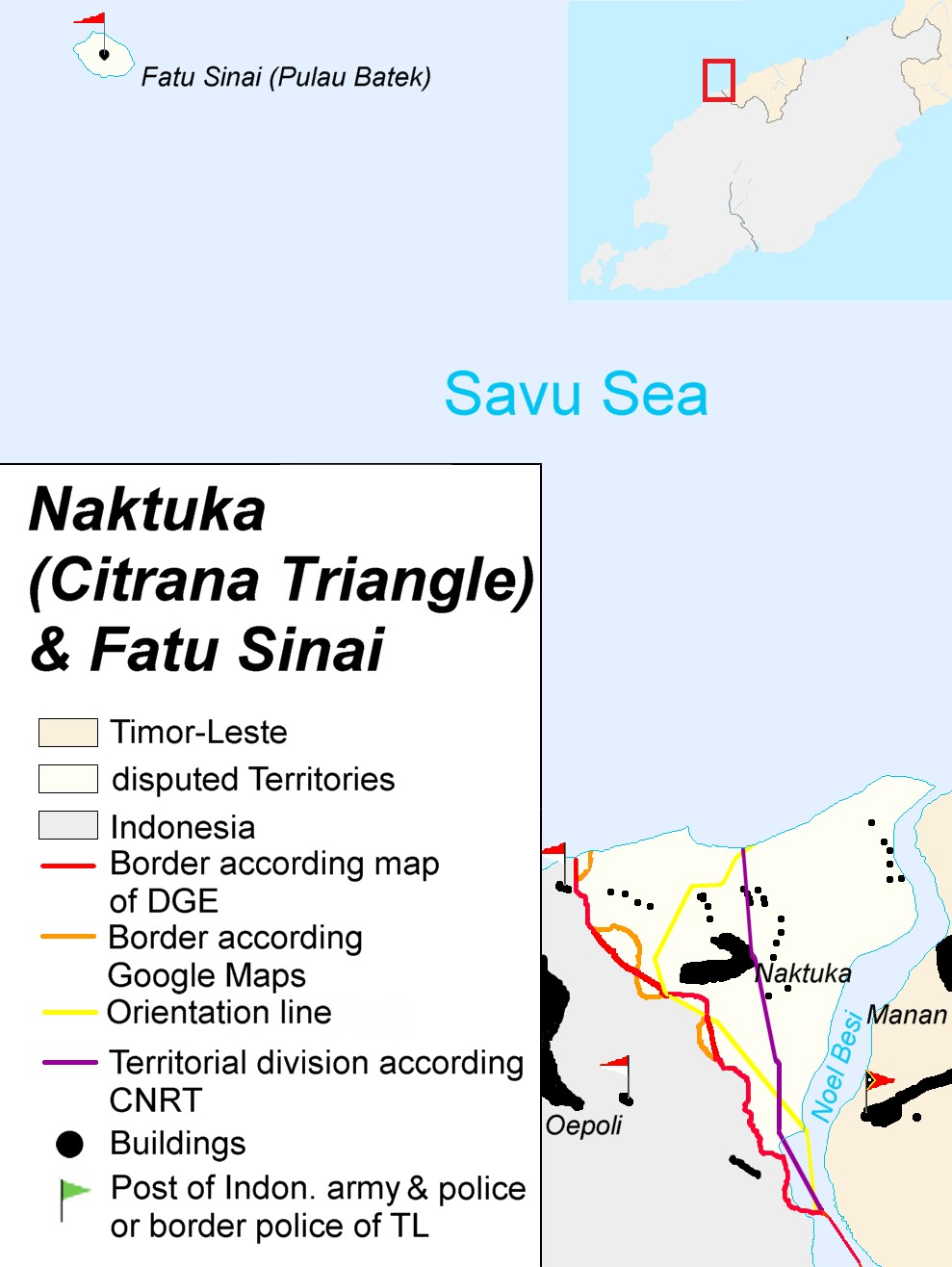
Naktuka and Batek Island with the different border post lines

In 2023, a joint technical team led by chief negotiators Roberto Soares (Timor-Leste) and Abdul Kadir Jailani (Indonesia) finalised the demarcation of the land border. The border was last demarcated with poles in the Citrana Triangle between 20 and 27 November. Controversy occurred on 24 January 2024, when FONGTIL, the umbrella organisation of Timor-Leste's non-governmental organisations, called for the signing of the border treaty planned for 26 January to be postponed and called on the national parliament not to ratify the treaty. It was recommended that a new commission be formed to examine the conformity of the agreements with the decision of the International Court of Arbitration of 1914. The 76 poles with the new border demarcation in the Citrana Triangle cut off 270 hectares of agricultural land around the village of Naktuka, which had been cultivated by its inhabitants for decades, and allocated it to Indonesia. The local population was not involved in the demarcation of the border. The inhabitants of Naktuka explained that the territory had been part of Portugal in colonial times and had belonged to Timor Timur during the Indonesian occupation. Indonesian officials from the province of East Nusa Tenggara later confirmed the claims of the East Timorese. FONGTIL therefore also feared an escalation of the conflict between Naktuka and the neighbouring Indonesian village of Oepoli (Kupang government district). The opposition in parliament immediately took up the criticism of the government of Xanana Gusmão, who has been Prime Minister of Timor-Leste again since 2023. Timor-Leste's President José Ramos-Horta stated that there were ‘still reasons’ to continue the discussion on the land border with Indonesia and expressed ‘optimism with regard to a joint solution’. He said he had confidence in the negotiating team led by the Prime Minister.

The signing of the border treaty did not take place during Xanana Gusmão's visit to Jakarta following criticism. Gusmão stated on 26 January that he had not yet made a decision on the matter and would travel to Oe-Cusse Ambeno in the next few days to see for himself and talk to the people. In a statement published on Facebook on January 31 by his party, the CNRT, stated that while the arbitration award between the Netherlands and Portugal did indeed award Naktuka entirely to Portugal, the historical border between the realms of Amfo'an (on the Dutch side) and Ambeno (on the Portuguese side) was the Noel Besi River, so Naktuka must belong entirely to Indonesia. The negotiators therefore came to the conclusion to divide Naktuka into two halves in order to find a compromise, although Amfo'an was not satisfied with this either. Despite the agreement reached, the signing of the border treaty has now been postponed for further negotiations. Attached to the statement was a satellite image in which Naktuka is even bisected in the centre, with the settlement on the Indonesian side. The arguments, border demarcation and images were referring to the results of a study by Prof. Indriana Kartini, a researcher at the National Research and Innovation Agency (BRIN) of Indonesia.

On 1 February, Xanana Gusmão visited the village of Naktuka. Gusmão explained that in 2014, during his last term as prime minister, he had promised Indonesia that Indonesian farmers who cultivate land in Naktuka would not be evicted. The residents of Naktuka had agreed to this at the time. However, an East Timorese official from the Ministry of Agriculture who has been working in Naktuka since 1996 said that he had never seen Indonesians farming there. Gusmão and negotiator Roberto Soares explained that the poles that had been placed did not represent a new boundary line, but rather marked reference points for the negotiations. The existing border points from the colonial era would support the demarcation in Timor-Leste's favour. The Prime Minister stated that the border agreement should now be signed in September during the visit of Indonesian President Joko Widodo to Timor-Leste. The inhabitants of Naktuka were invited to send representatives.

== Border crossings ==
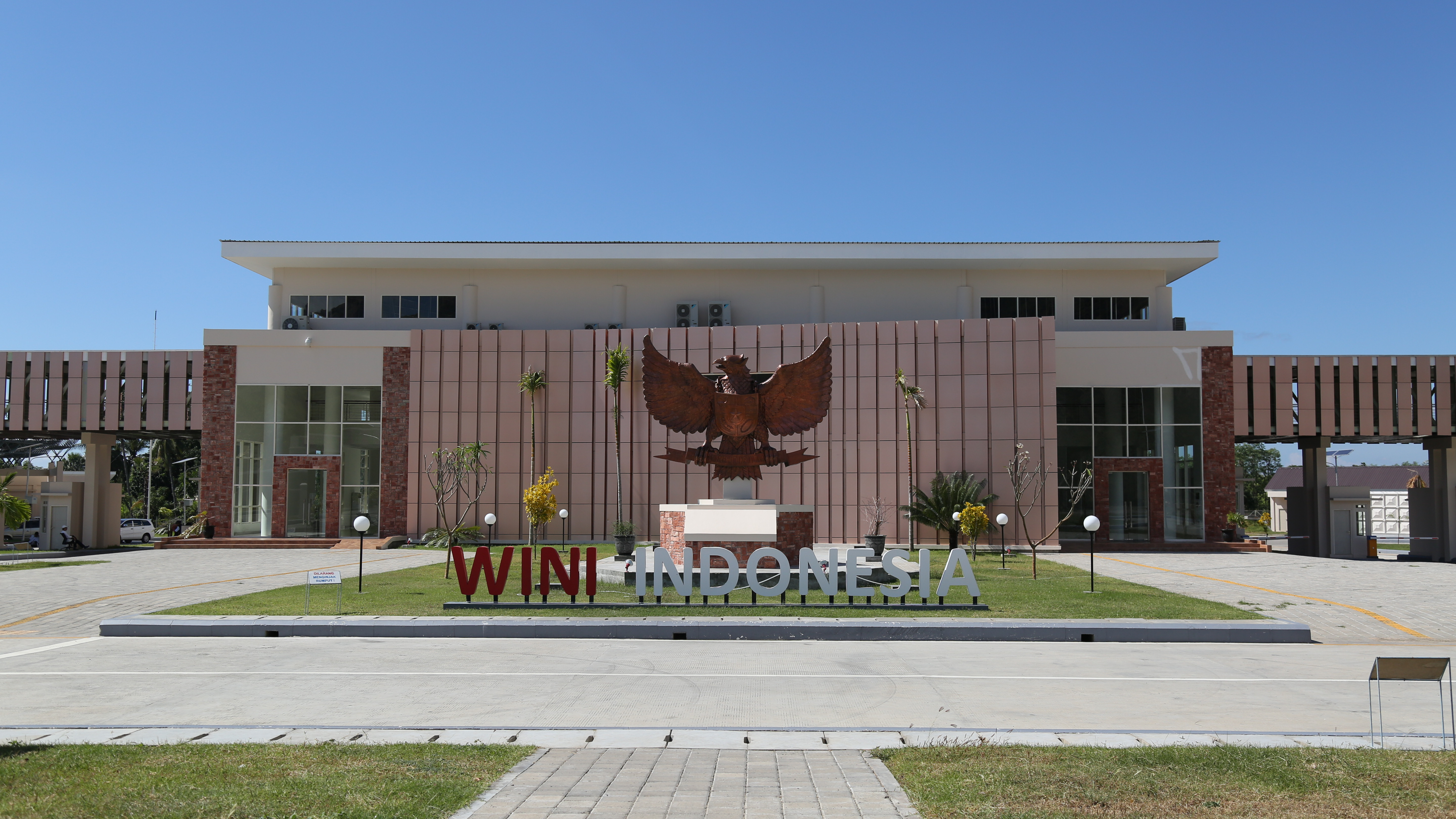
A new Indonesian border post at Wini, from Indonesia's side

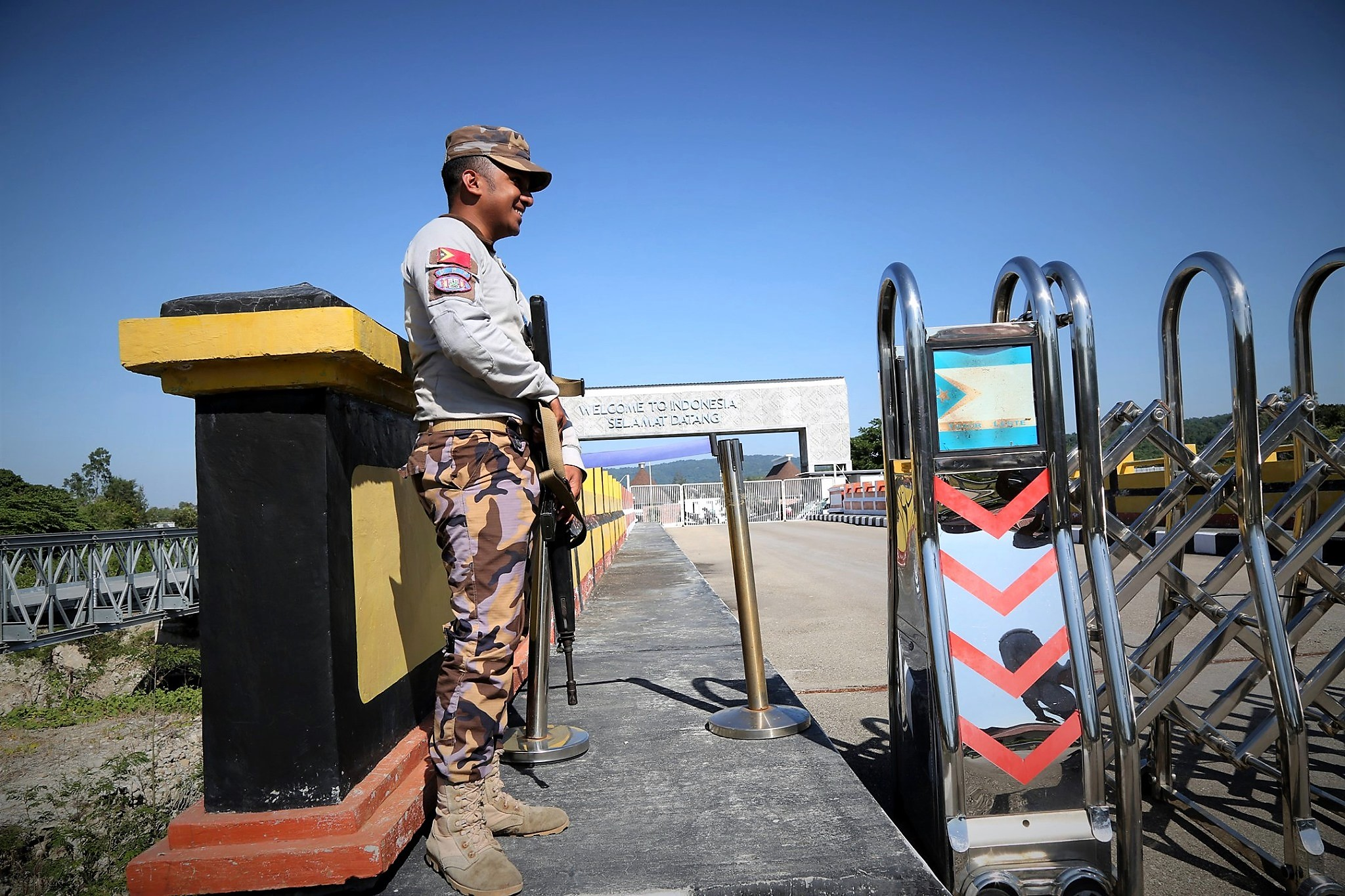
The border crossing in Motamasin

Border crossings from Timor-Leste's main territory to Indonesia exist at Mota'ain, near the north coast, and Motamasin, on the south coast to Indonesia's West Timor. There is no regular bus service. From Oe-Cusse Ambeno, border crossings at Napan/Bobometo (Oesilo administrative post), Sacato/Wini and Passabe lead to West Timor. However, only Bobometo and Sacato are legal crossings.

- Wini (IDN) – Sacato (sometimes spelled Sakato) (TLS)
- Motamasin (IDN) – Salele (TLS)
- Mota'ain (IDN) – Batugade (TLS)

== Gallery ==
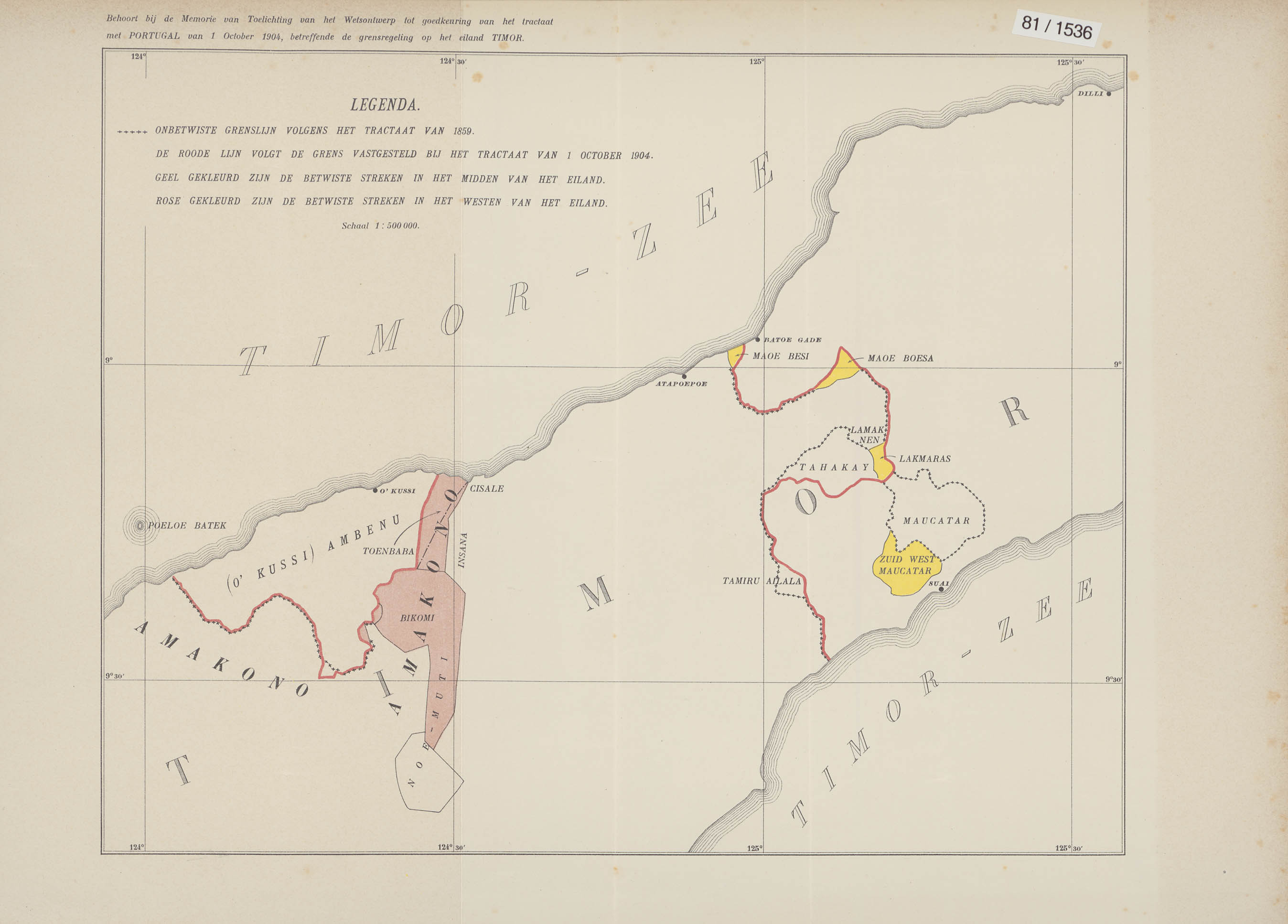
Map of boundary changes made in 1904

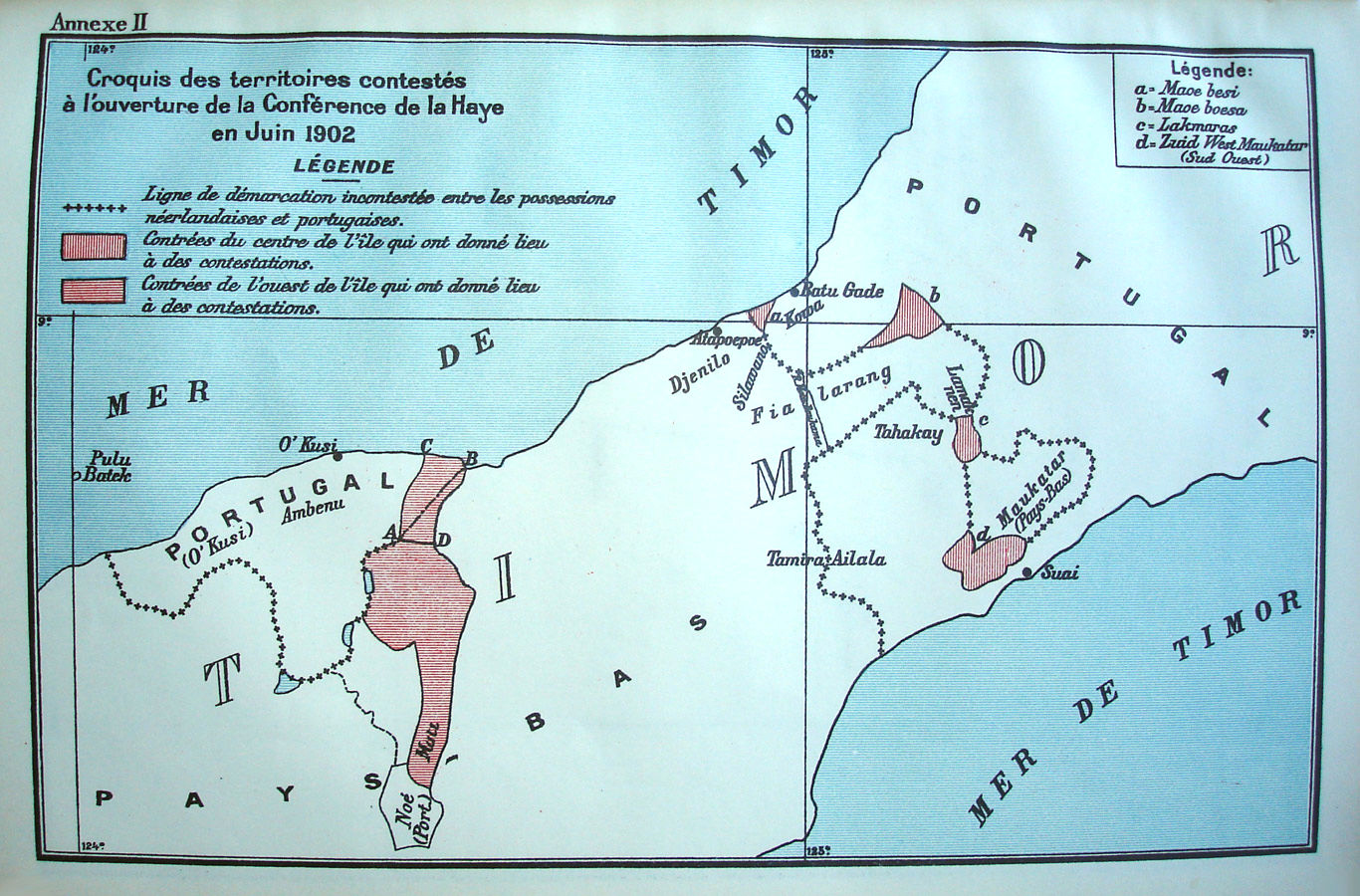
1902 boundary map

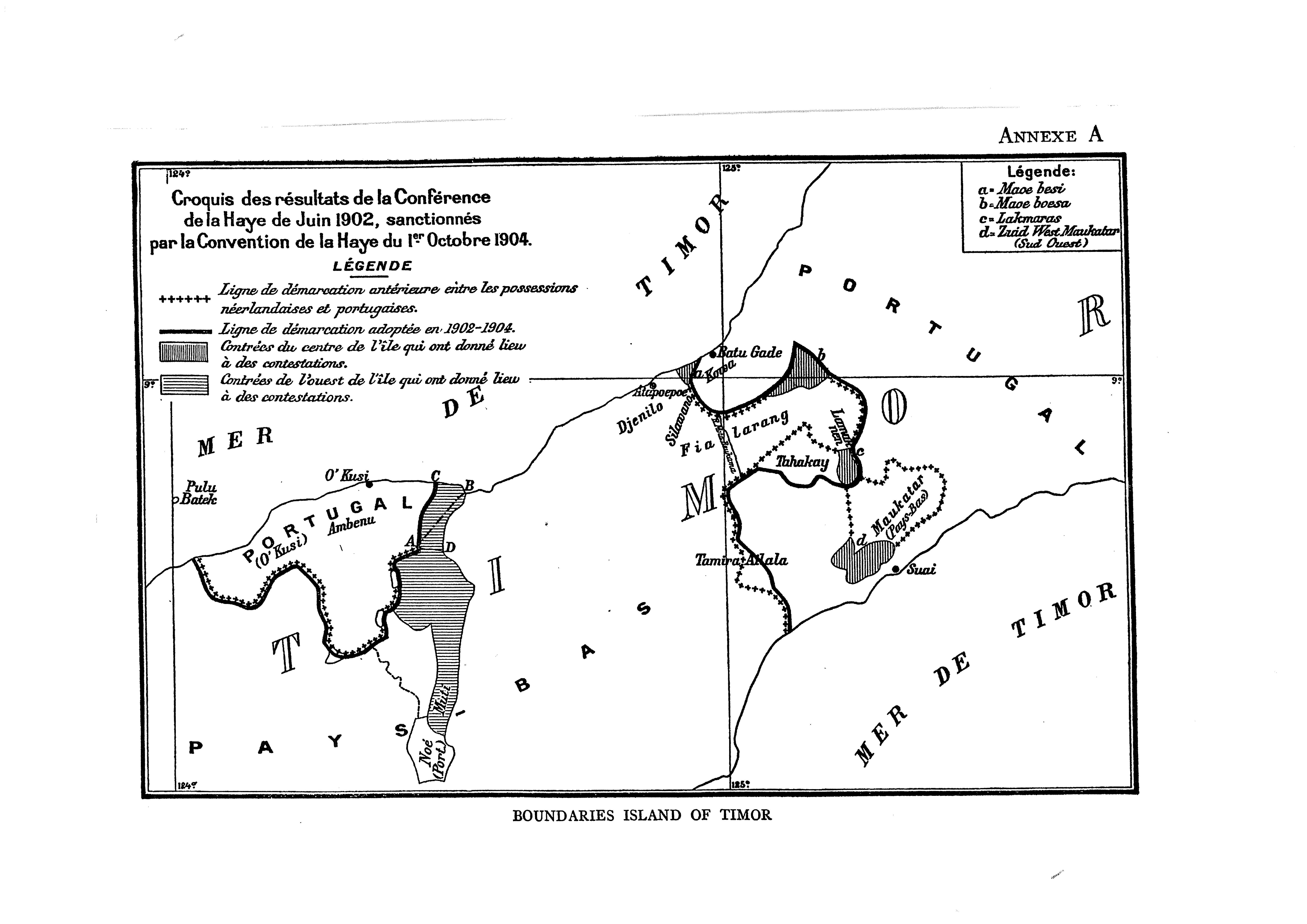
1914 arbitration map

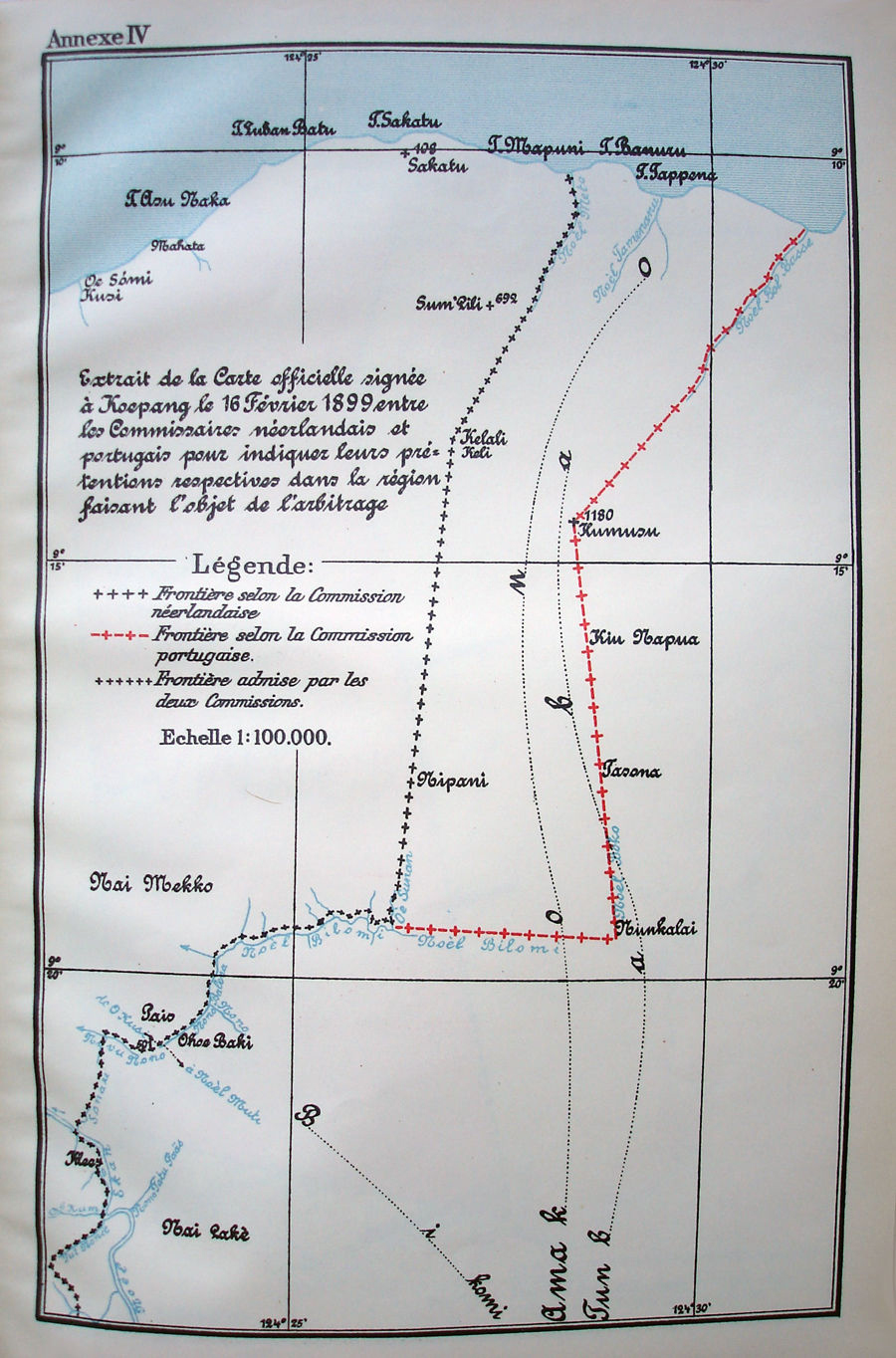
1914 arbitration map, showing conflicting Dutch and Portuguese claims in eastern Oecusse

== See also ==
- Indonesia–Timor-Leste relations
