= Sakato =

Sakato may refer to:

- George T. Sakato (1921–2015), American soldier who received the Medal of Honor
- Sacato, East Timor, a village in the exclave of Oecusse, East Timor
