= Wini, Indonesia =

Coordinates: 9°11′00″S 124°29′30″E

Wini is a village in the Nusa Tenggara Timur province of Indonesia. It is the capital of the North Insana district (Kecamatan Insana Utara) of the North Central Timor Regency (Kabupaten Timor Tengah Utara). It is located on the north coast of the western part of the island of Timor, between Timor-Leste to the east and its exclave of Oecusse to the west. A major border crossing checkpoint (pos lintas batas negara) into Timor-Leste's exclave of Oecussi is located here.

== Location ==
Wini is located on the north coast of the island of Timor. It is about 45km north Kefamenanu, the capital city of North Central Timor Regency within which Wini is located. The village is on the Timor-Leste-Indonesia border, just east of the border with Timor-Leste's Oecusse border.

== Tourism ==
Wini's main tourism attraction is the beach, which is popular as a weekend destination for the local population. The main beaches are Wini Beach (Pantai Wini) and Idola Beach (Pantai Idola). Another popular beach is Cape Bastian (Tanjung Bastian) located 8km to the east of Wini. Besides beaches, the new Wini Border Crossing Checkpoint complex (see below) is also a popular attraction.

== Transport and Infrastructure ==
Roads connect Wini with Kefamenanu 45km to the south via Manamas. A coastal road also links Wini with the main Kupang–Dili road about 53km to the east. From the intersection, it is a further 22km to Mota'ain, where the border crossing into Timor-Leste proper is located. This route between these two border crossings the shortest between East Timor proper and its Oecussi exclave. To the west, a road crosses the border river to Sacato (sometimes spelled Sakato) and onward to Pante Macassar, the capital of Oecusse.

Wini has a harbor. Manganese ore is exported via the port, but only ships with less than 5000 gross tons can dock.

== Border crossing ==
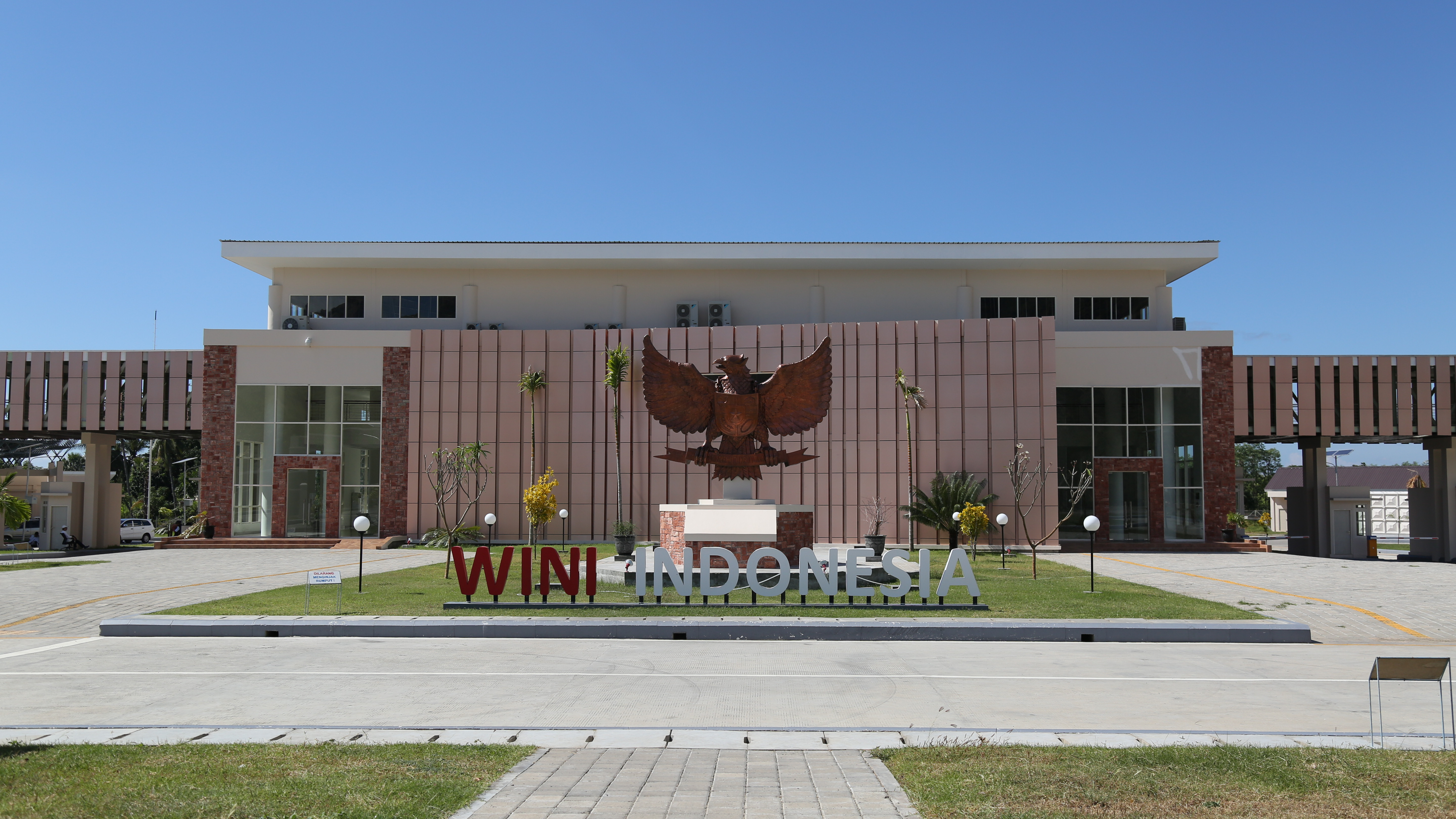
Border Post in town of Wini

The Wini border crossing checkpoint is a modern complex comprising customs, immigration and quarantine facilities catering to pedestrian and vehicular traffic crossing between Indonesia and Timor-Leste. The checkpoint on the Timor-Leste side of the border is Sakato. The new border crossing checkpoint complex was developed at a cost of 130 billion rupiah beginning 2015 and was officially inaugurated on 9 January 2018. The complex, which is located on a 4.42-hectare (10.9-acre) site, replaced an earlier border crossing facilities which were housed in small buildings.
