= Salele =

Village in East Timor

Coordinates: 8°44′S 126°17′E

Salele is a village in Timor-Leste located in the suco of Lalawa in the Tilomar Administrative Post (formerly called subdistrict) of the Cova Lima Municipality. It is the location of the second main border crossing between the Timor-Leste and Indonesia. The checkpoint on the Indonesian side of the border is called the Motamasin checkpoint.

== Geography ==
Salele is located on the southern coastline of Timor island, at the southwesternmost corner of Timor-Leste. It is located just east of the Mota Masin River which forms the Timor-Leste-Indonesia border.

== Transportation ==
The village is served by the main road linking Suai, 25 km to the east, with the town of Betun, the capital of Malaka Regency which is located 30 km to the west across the border in Indonesia.

== Border crossing ==
The Salele integrated frontier checkpoint is located just east of the Motamasin River which forms the Timor-Leste-Indonesia border. The checkpoint on the Indonesia side is the Motamasin border crossing checkpoint.

The checkpoint was newly built to cater to cross border traffic after East Timor became independent and opened by Vice Prime Minister Jose Luis Guterres on 26 June 2012. This is the main border crossing for the southern coast of East Timor, linking Suai city with the West Timor cities of Betun and Besikama.
