= Sacato, Timor-Leste =

Coordinates: 9°10′S 124°28′E

Sacato, sometimes spelled Sakato (Portuguese: Sacato, Tetum: Sakato), is a village in Timor-Leste. It is located in the suco of Nipane within the Pante Macassar Administrative Post in the Oecusse Special Administrative Region. It also the main border crossing between the East Timorese exclave of Oecusse and Indonesia.

== Geography ==
Sacato is located on the Oecusse coastline which is on the northern coast of Timor island. It is located to the west of the Noel Meto river which forms the Indonesia–Timor-Leste border. The mountains of Oecusse rise up behind Sacato.

== Transportation ==
The village is served by the main road from Pante Macassar, the capital of Oecusse which is located 15 km to the east. From Sacato, the distance to the main part of Timor-Leste via the Mota'ain/Batugade border crossing is about 75 km along the northern coastal road which traverses North Central Timor Regency and Belu Regency of Nusa Tenggara Timur, Indonesia.

== Border crossing checkpoint ==
The Sacato integrated frontier checkpoint (Portuguese: Posto Fronteirico Integrado) is located 15 km east of Pante Makassar and just west of the bridge over the Noel Meto which forms the Indonesia–Timor-Leste border. The checkpoint on the Indonesia side is called the Wini border crossing checkpoint.

The checkpoint was newly built to cater to immigration, customs, quarantine and security procedures after Timor-Leste became independent. The facility was opened by Vice Prime Minister Jose Luis Guterres on 28 June 2012. The border crossing is the main one for Oecusse as it is located on the shortest route between Oecusse and the main border crossing into the main part of Timor-Leste at Mota'ain/Batugade.

== Gallery ==
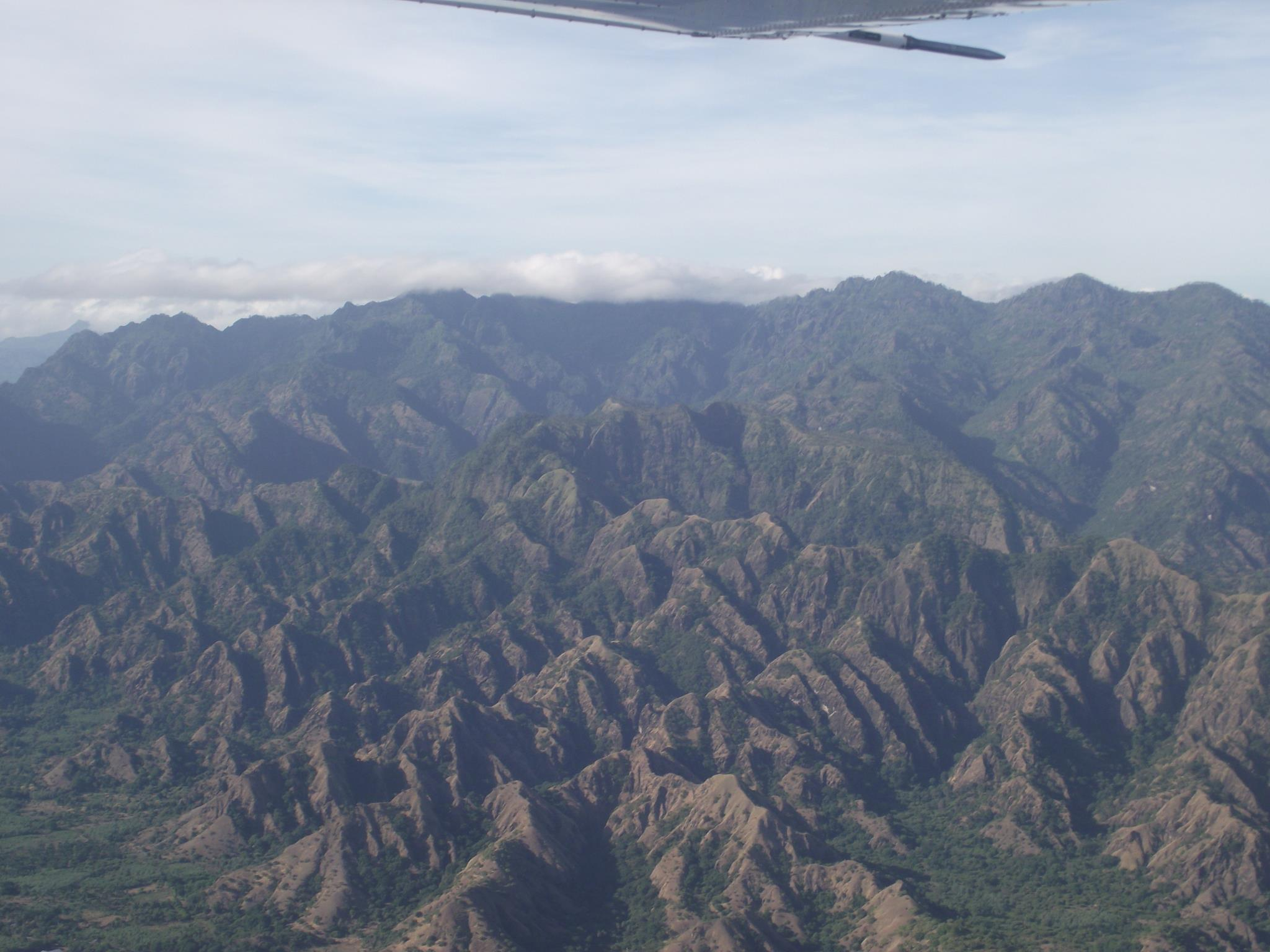
Mountains behind Sacato.

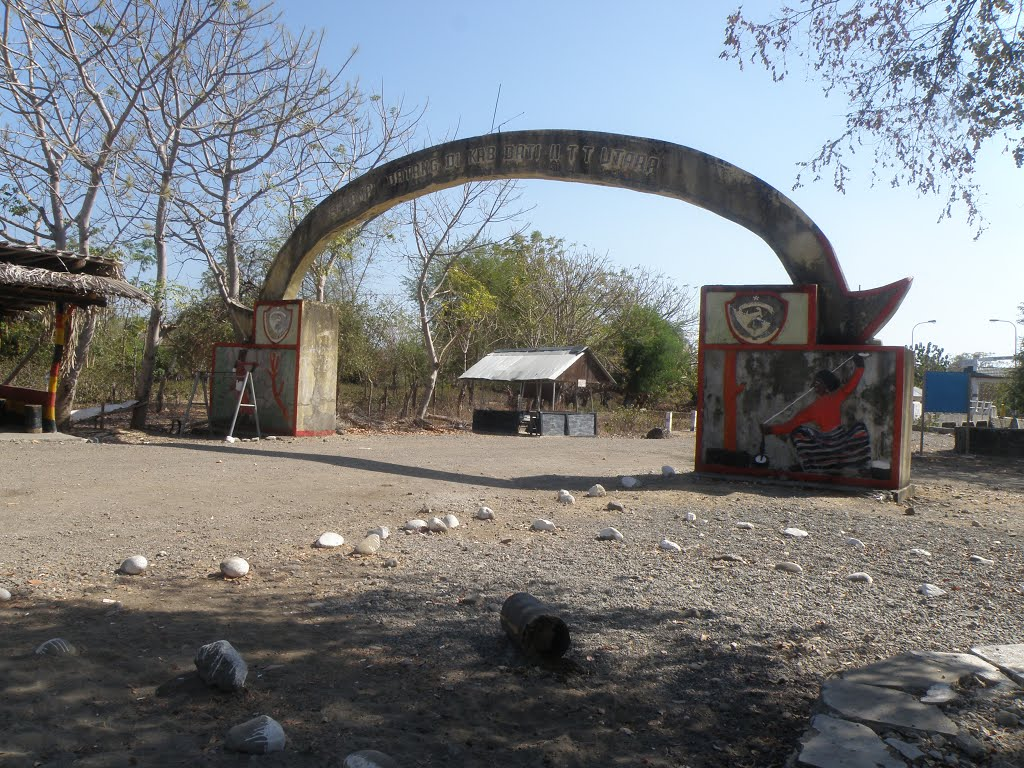
Old arch on the Sacato side of the border in 2009 before the new checkpoint was built.
