= Mota'ain =

Coordinates: 8°57′33″S 124°57′03″E

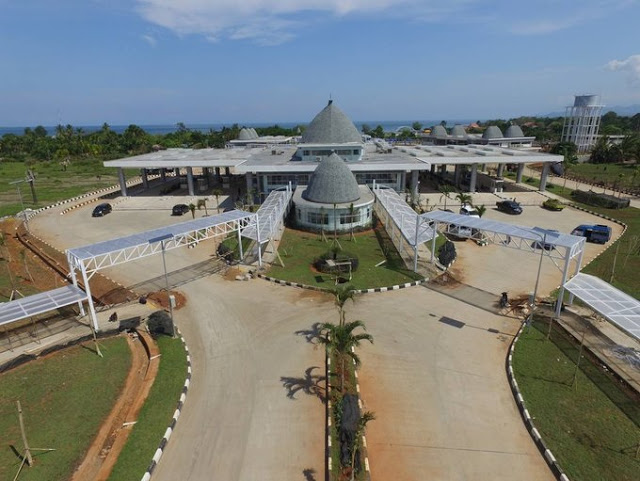
Aerial view of the new Mota'ain Border Crossing Checkpoint

Mota'ain, also spelled Motain, Mota'in or Mota Ain, is a hamlet in the Silawan village (desa), East Tasifeto district (kecamatan), Belu Regency, East Nusa Tenggara, Indonesia.

A major border crossing checkpoint with customs, immigration and quarantine services between Indonesia and Timor-Leste, called the Mota'ain Border Crossing Checkpoint, is located in the village. The corresponding checkpoint on the Timor-Leste side is Batugade.

Mota'ain is on the main road between Kupang in Indonesia, 290 km to the southwest, and the Timor-Leste capital Dili which is 113 km to the east. The nearest major city is Atambua, the capital of Belu Regency. The port of Atapupu is located 5 km to the west.

== Border Crossing ==
The Mota'ain Border Crossing Checkpoint (Indonesian: Pos Lintas Batas Negara) is a modern complex providing customs, immigration and quarantine services for pedestrian and vehicular traffic crossing between Timor-Leste and Indonesia. The new complex, which replaced an earlier smaller facility which was set up when Timor-Leste separated from Indonesia, was officially opened by Indonesian president Joko Widodo on 28 December 2016. Construction of the new checkpoint complex, which is located on a 8-hectare (20-acre) site, began in 2015 and cost 82 billion rupiah.

== Shooting Incident of 1999 ==
On 10 October 1999, International Force East Timor (INTERFET) troops - a platoon from 2 RAR - patrolling along the main road were shot at as they were approaching the border bridge at Mota'ain while within East Timor territory. Reports stated that the shots were fired by either pro-Indonesian militia or the Indonesian police. The INTERFET troops returned fire in the ensuing clash. Reports stated that in a meeting between the Indonesian army and INTERFET following the incident it was established that the INTERFET troops were still about 100 metres inside East Timor territory when they were fired upon.

== Gallery ==
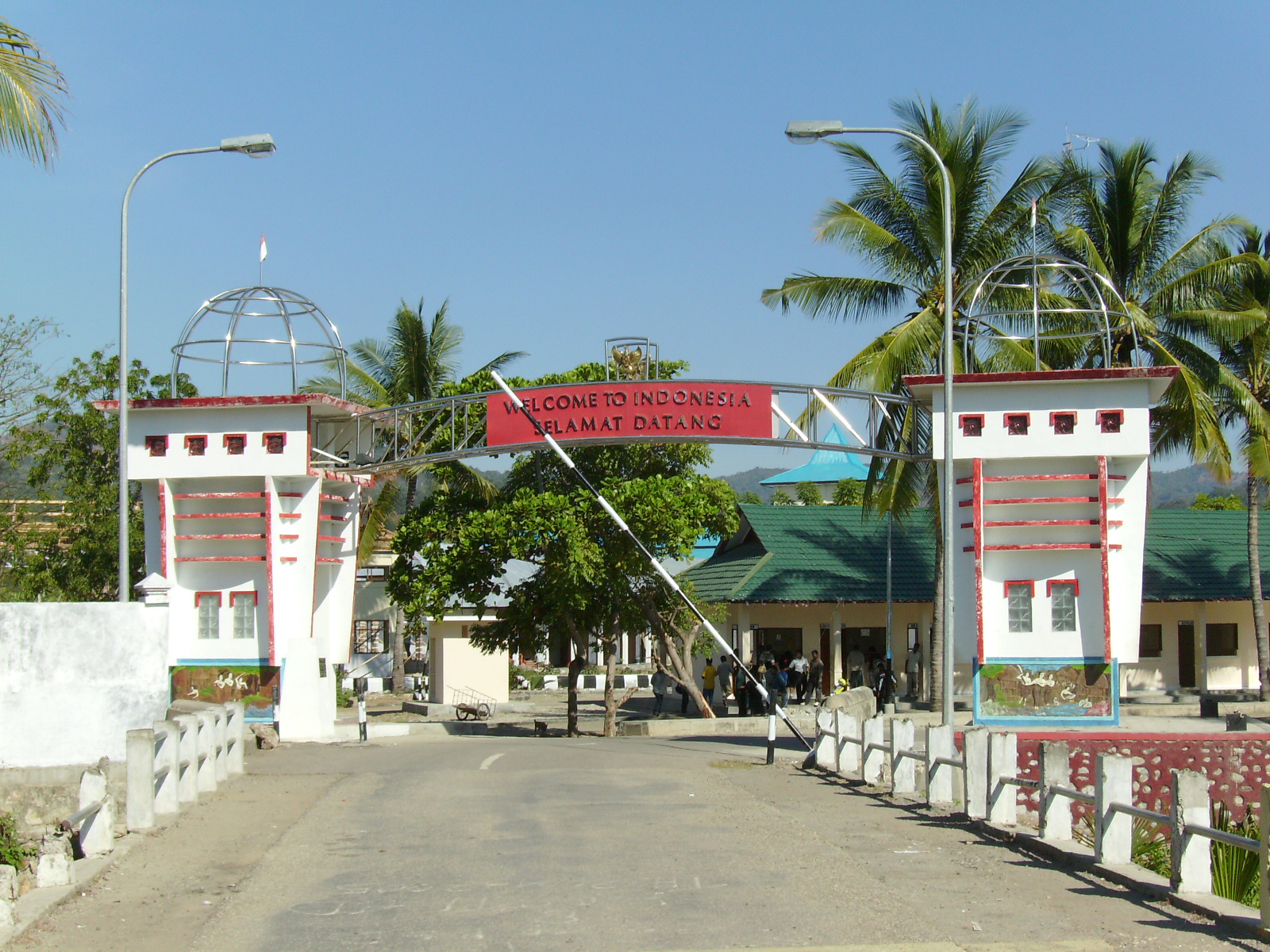
View of the old Mota'ain Border Crossing Checkpoint, from Timor-Leste territory

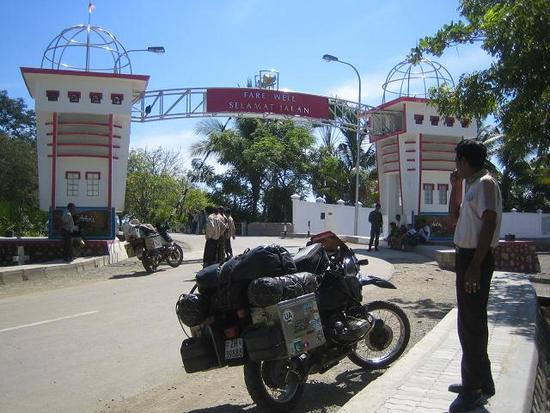
Arch of the old Mota'ain checkpoint, looking towards Timor-Leste

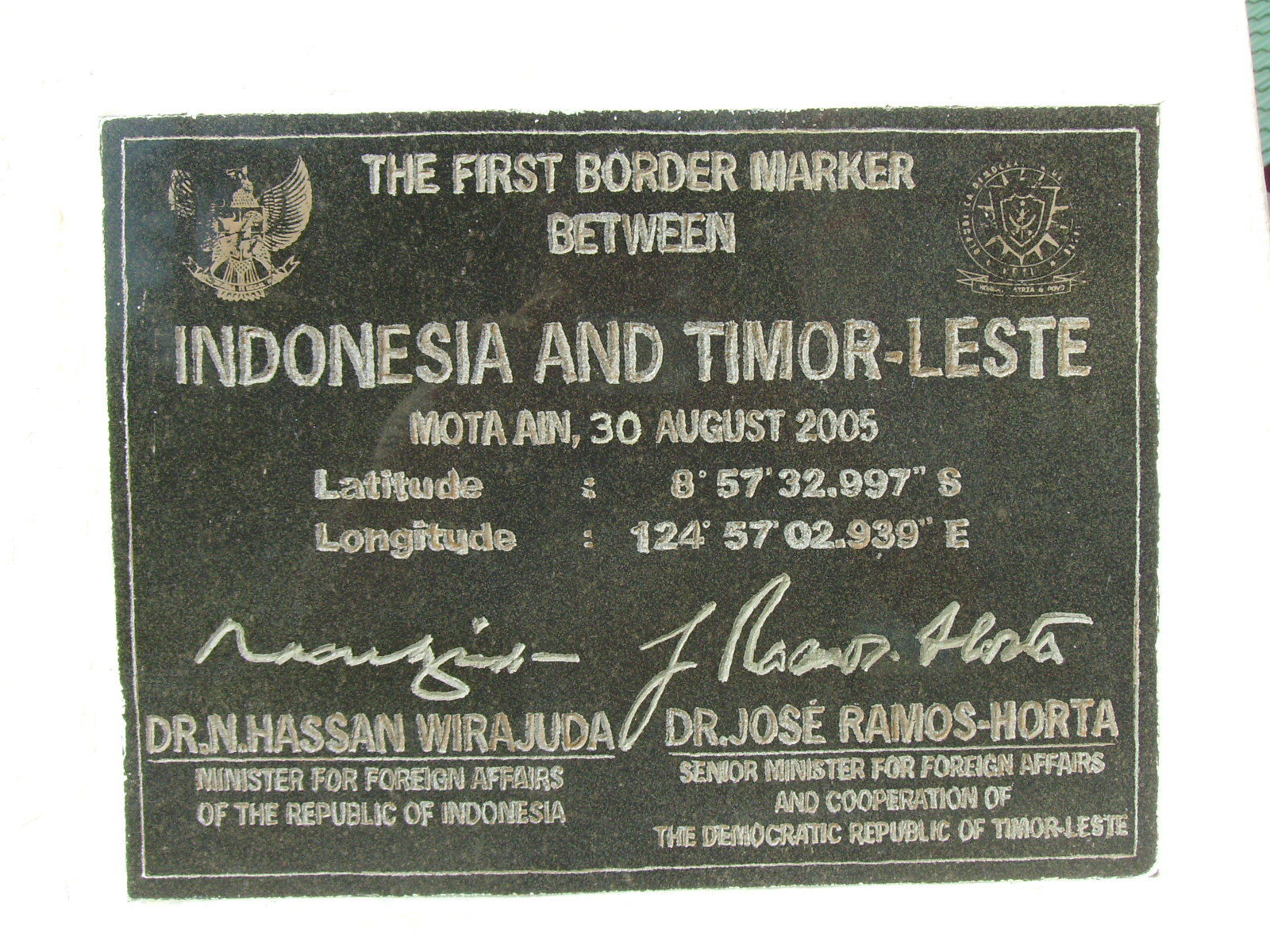
Plaque on one of the pair of border markers on each side of the river marking the East Timor-Indonesia boundary at Mota'ain/Batugade

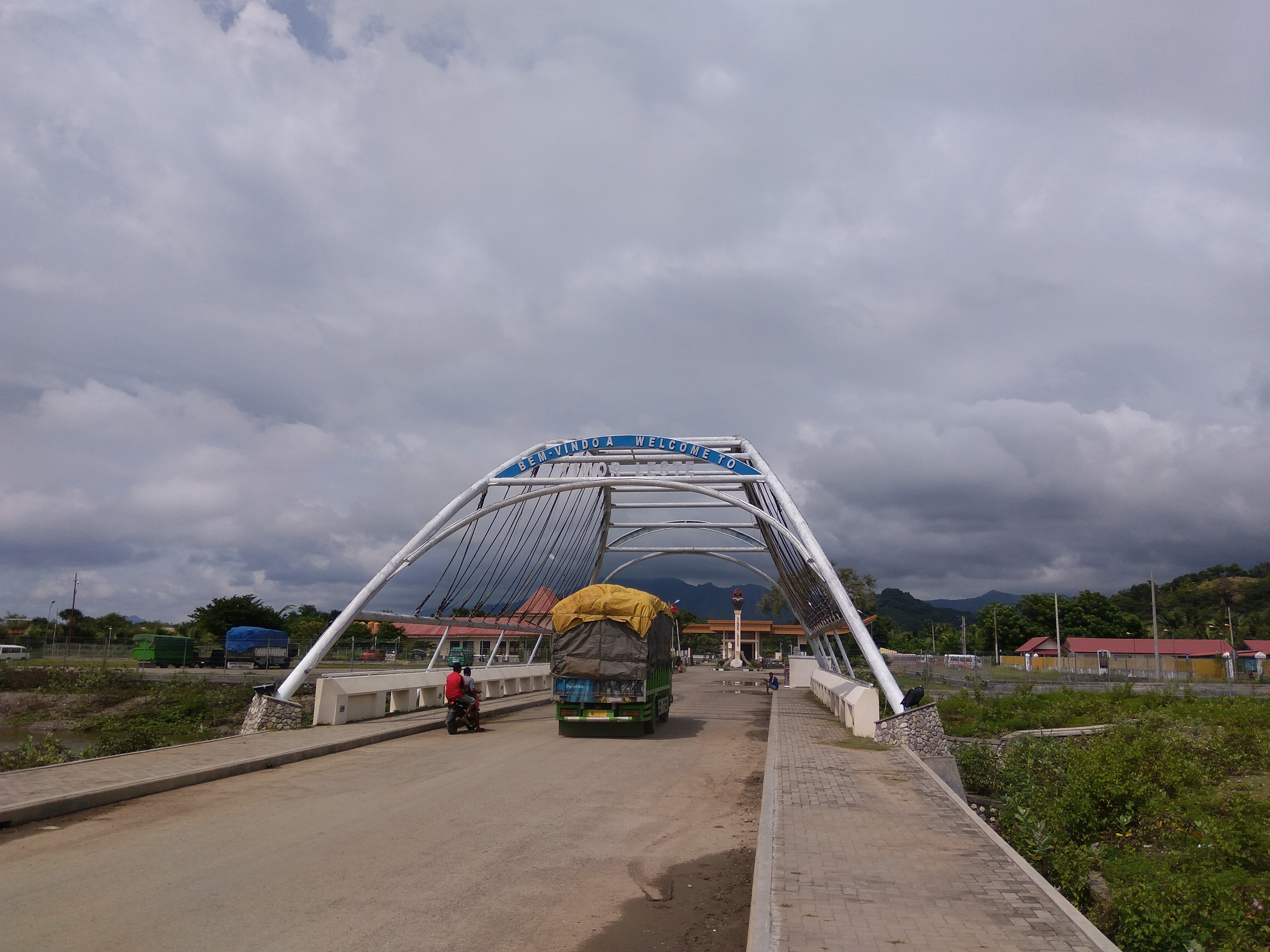
Bridge connecting Mota'ain in Indonesia to Batugade in Timor-Leste
