= Noefefan Bridge =

Road bridge over the Tono River

Noefefan Bridge Ponte Noefefan (Portuguese) Ponte Noefefan (Tetum)
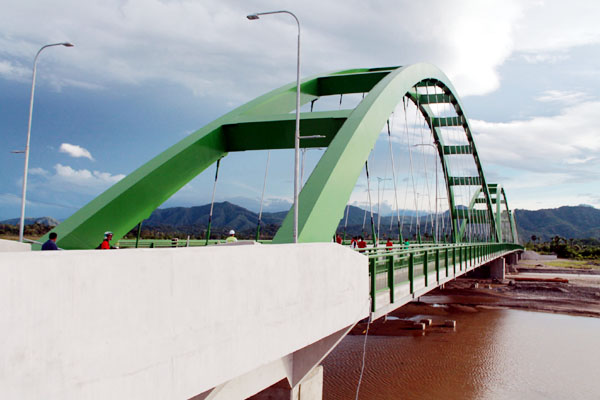
- Coordinates: 9°12′30″S 124°18′46″E
- Carries: Pante Macassar–Citrana National Road
- Crosses: Tono River
- Locale: Lifau, Oecusse, Timor-Leste
- Official name: Noefefan Bridge
- Other names: Tono bridge; (before completion)

Characteristics
- Design: Tied-arch
- Material: Concrete, steel
- Total length: 380 m (1,250 ft)
- Width: 7 m (23 ft); (roadway); 1.6 m (5 ft 3 in); (each footpath)
- Height: 20 m (66 ft)
- No. of spans: 3, each 120 m (390 ft) long
- Piers in water: 2
- No. of lanes: 2
- Design life: 100 years

History
- Engineering design by: Waagner Biro Indonesia
- Constructed by: PT Adhi Karya (Persero), Tbk
- Construction start: April 2015
- Construction cost: US$ 17 million
- Inaugurated: 10 June 2017

Location
- Interactive map of Noefefan Bridge

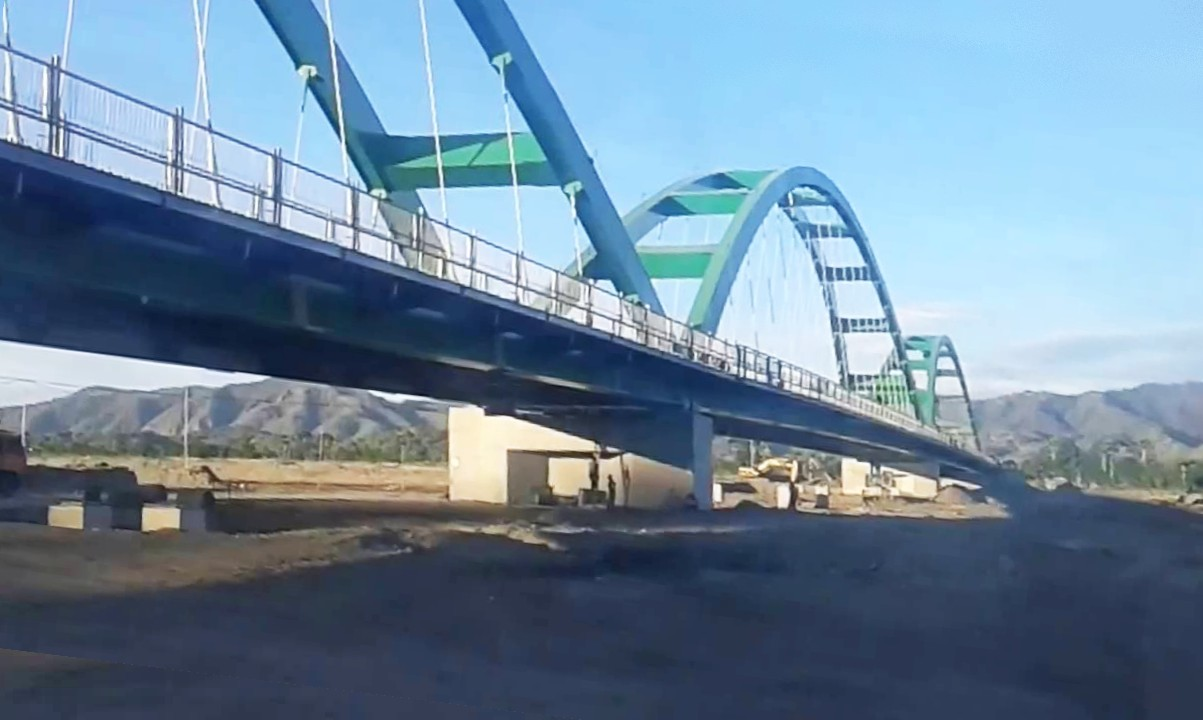
Noefefan Bridge as seen from the dry river bed

The Noefefan Bridge (Portuguese: Ponte Noefefan, Tetum: Ponte Noefefan) is a two-lane road bridge over the Tono River in the suco of Lifau, a village in Oecusse, the East Timorese exclave on the north western coast of Timor. As of 2017, when the bridge was inaugurated, it was the largest bridge ever built in Timor-Leste. It connects several isolated communities west of the river with Pante Macassar to its east.

A World Bank report published in 2016, the year before the bridge was completed, observed that 95% of Oecusse households participating in a survey had expressed dissatisfaction with the state of roads and bridges in that region. However, the East Timorese government development program of which the bridge is a part has not been universally praised, and as of 2018, the paved road over the bridge ended abruptly at the latter's western extremity.

== Location ==
The bridge spans the estuary of the Tono River within 0.5 km (0.31 mi) of the Savu Sea. Its deck carries part of the coastal road linking Pante Macassar, Oecusse's capital city, with Citrana at the exclave's far western end, and also with the road to Passabe near its southernmost point.

== History ==
=== Background ===
Lifau was the first place on the island of Timor to be settled by Europeans. Between 1512 and 1515, Portuguese traders were the first of the Europeans to arrive in the area; they landed near modern Pante Macassar, about 5 km (3.1 mi) to the east of Lifau. Only much later was a permanent Portuguese settlement established at Lifau.

By the seventeenth century, Lifau had become the centre of Portuguese activities on Timor, which had extended into the interior of the island. In 1702, Lifau and its environs officially became a Portuguese colony, known as Portuguese Timor. However, Portuguese control over the territory was tenuous, particularly in the mountainous interior. In 1769, the capital of Portuguese Timor was transferred from Lifau eastwards to Dili, due to frequent attacks from the local Eurasian Topass group. Most of West Timor was left to Dutch forces, who were conquering what is today Indonesia. In the 1780s, a reconciliation took place between the governor in Dili and the Topasses, who henceforth usually supported the Portuguese government.

In 1859, under the Treaty of Lisbon, Portugal and the Netherlands divided the island between them. For the most part, West Timor became Dutch, with its colonial seat at Kupang. East Timor became Portuguese, with its seat in Dili. Lifau and its environs, known as Oecusse, was confirmed as a Portuguese exclave, with the Savu Sea to its north west, but otherwise surrounded by Dutch territory.

In 1975, Indonesia, which had since become independent, began an invasion of Portuguese Timor. After conquering that territory, including Oecusse, the Indonesians proceeded to occupy it until 1999, when the East Timorese voted for independence. Before leaving, the Indonesian military and its allies inflicted a scorched earth policy on the territory, especially in Oecusse. When Timor-Leste became independent in 2002, the new Constitution of Timor-Leste expressly provided, in recognition of Oecusse's very longstanding particular disadvantages, that the exclave would "... enjoy special administrative and economic treatment ..." and "... be governed by a special administrative policy and economic regime".

In 2013, the government of Timor-Leste appointed former prime minister Mari Alkatiri to oversee the development of a special economic zone in Oecusse. The following year, the National Parliament of Timor-Leste took a further step towards complying with the government's constitutional obligations towards Oecusse, by enacting a law for the creation of an Authority of the Oecusse Special Administrative Region (Portuguese: Autoridade da Região Administrativa Especial Oé-Cusse – ARAEO), and for the designation of Oecusse as a Special Zone of Social Market Economy (Portuguese: Zona Especial de Economia Social de Mercado – ZEESM). On 23 and 24 January 2015, the central government formally handed over some of its powers to the ARAEO and the ZEESM.

=== The Tono bridge project ===
As well as being an exclave subjected to traditional, centuries-old isolation, the Oecusse of the beginning of the 21st century had natural conditions hampering development. Abundant rainfall often caused floods imposing barriers to transport connections. Especially during the rainy season, the Tono River, the estuary of which reaches a long distance into Oecusse's interior, often cut off half the region from road access to Pante Macassar and Dili. In particular, the river isolated more than 3,600 families who lived in the coastal sucos of Bene-Ufe, Usitaco, Suni-Ufe, Taiboco, and part of Lifau, from basic services offered by the government in Pante Macassar.

The government needed to come up with practical solutions for such naturally caused problems. As early as 2013, Alkatiri was already publicising a fully formed plan for the development of Oecusse. The plan comprised a substantial number of proposed buildings and capital investments, including a 380 m (1,250 ft) bridge over the Tono River on the coastal road between Pante Macassar and Citrana.

In October 2014, the Ministry of Public Works appointed PT Adhi Karya (Persero), Tbk to construct the proposed bridge, at a contract value of US$17,218,000. On 5 November 2014, Alkatiri, in his capacity as president of ARAEO, together with the Minister of Public Works, Gastão de Sousa, presided over ground-breaking ceremonies for the construction of several of the development projects, including the bridge. The actual construction of the bridge did not begin until April 2015, five months later than planned. Initially, the bridge was planned to be a truss bridge. However, at the suggestion of Waagner Biro Indonesia, the company engaged by Adhi Karya to manufacture the bridge's components, the design was modified to transform the planned bridge into a tied-arch structure. An engineering geology study carried out for the construction of the bridge concluded that an arch bridge in the area would have a low level of technical risks, and the bridge ended up being built as a tied-arch bridge.

On 10 June 2017, the bridge was inaugurated by the president of Timor-Leste, Francisco Guterres, with assistance from Alkatiri. The total cost of the bridge to completion was said to have been US$17 million. During his speech at the inauguration ceremony, the president described the bridge as "... undoubtedly, a solid and singularly beautiful basic infrastructure ..." and as "... high-quality work [that] embellishes the landscape ..." He also commented:

"The Noefefan Bridge is the result of a new philosophy. [It] is an integral part of a new development model ... It is in [Oecusse] that we have been focussing tremendous efforts for the construction of basic infrastructure, necessary to attract national and foreign investors, create jobs, and accelerate sustainable economic growth, while simultaneously ensuring social development."

As was acknowledged by the ZEESM when it announced that the bridge had been inaugurated, a World Bank report published in 2016 had observed that 95% of Oecusse households participating in a survey had expressed dissatisfaction with the state of roads and bridges in that region. However, the ZEESM development program of which the bridge is a part has not been universally praised. One commentator, Laura S. Meitzner Yoder, observed in 2016 that many Oecusse residents had initially been excited and positive about the program, but had later become disillusioned, angry and fearful as its implementation had begun in earnest. In 2018, two other commentators, Jerry Courvisanos and Matias Boavida, noted that many public sector works, including the bridge, were being built in Oecusse in a very impressive manner, but went on to comment there had been "... no coordination from the foundation of this project that links the private sector to all that is being built".

As of 2018, when Australian author Lisa Palmer visited the bridge, it was, as she later wrote, a "... coveted symbol of the incoming 'light' of modernity". She stated she had been told that the bridge was "... where the nightlife is really found ...", and she had been expecting riverside bars or eateries. During her visit, however, the 'nightlife' was confined to a small group of truck drivers and young motorcyclists taking selfies with the structure of the bridge in the background. Palmer also observed that the paved road over the bridge ended abruptly at the latter's western extremity, and that the dirt road following the coastline from there to the border with Indonesia was "... a long and bumpy slog ..."

By 2019, the RAEOA had initiated three further road transport projects, including Package 5, a program for a complex 35 km (22 mi) long National Road linking the Noefefan Bridge with Citrana, passing through diverse geological landscapes, and requiring the construction of more than 20 road bridges. In July 2019, the RAEOA called for expressions of interest for prequalification of companies interested in providing supervisory engineering services for the three projects.

== Description ==
The Noefefan Bridge is a tied-arch structure weighing approximately 2,000 t (2,000 long tons; 2,200 short tons). It consists of three arches, each 120 m-long (390 ft). Upon its completion and inauguration in 2017, it was expected to last 100 years. At 380 m-long (1,250 ft), 6 m-wide (20 ft) and 20 m-high (66 ft), it was also the largest bridge ever built in East Timor.

The bridge connects Citrana, Passabe and other isolated communities west of the Tono River with Pante Macassar to its east. It provides those communities with permanent access to markets, the Dili–Pante Macassar ferry and the Oecusse Airport, even during the rainy season (November to April). It also gives approximately 3,000 farmers, who cultivate more than 1,000 ha (2,500 acres) of rice fields near the Tono River, superior access to the region's port at Pante Macassar. Equally, it improves the ability of government agencies to deliver essential services to the formerly isolated communities, including health services, education, water supply and sanitation, and electricity distribution.

== See also ==
- Transport in Timor-Leste
