= Monumento de Lifau =

Lifau Monument
- Monumentu Lifau
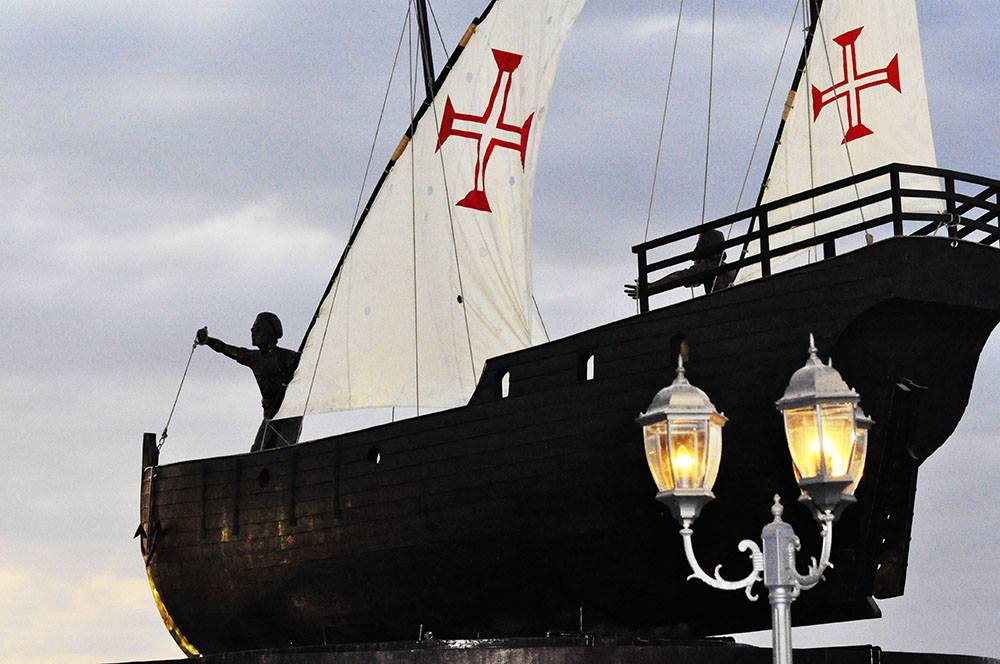
- Lifau Monument
- Interactive map of the Lifau Monument area

General information
- Type: Monument
- Architectural style: Portuguese Colonial architecture
- Location: Lifau, Oecusse Municipality, Timor-Leste
- Coordinates: 9°12′2.29″S 124°19′15.5″E
- Construction started: 2015
- Completed: 2015
- Inaugurated: November 27, 2015
- Owner: Ministry of Tourism, Trade and Industry (Timor-Leste)

Height
- Height: 4.3 m

Technical details
- Material: Bronze

Design and construction
- Architect: Joaquim de Brito

The Lifau Monument (Tetum: Monumentu Lifau) is a monument located in the town of Lifau, within the administrative post of Pante Macassar in the Oecusse municipality of Timor-Leste. The monument, in the shape of a bronze caravel, commemorates the 500th anniversary of the arrival of the Portuguese on the island of Timor.

== Historical background ==
The first European expedition to reach the islands of the Moluccas, Banda, and Timor was led by Portuguese navigator António de Abreu in 1512, although he did not land on Timor. Later, Portuguese Dominican friars settled in Timor on 18 August 1515 and founded the town of Lifau in 1556 to protect the Timorese region and the trade of sandalwood. Lifau was the first capital of Portuguese Timor, a colony of Portugal until 1975.

== Features ==
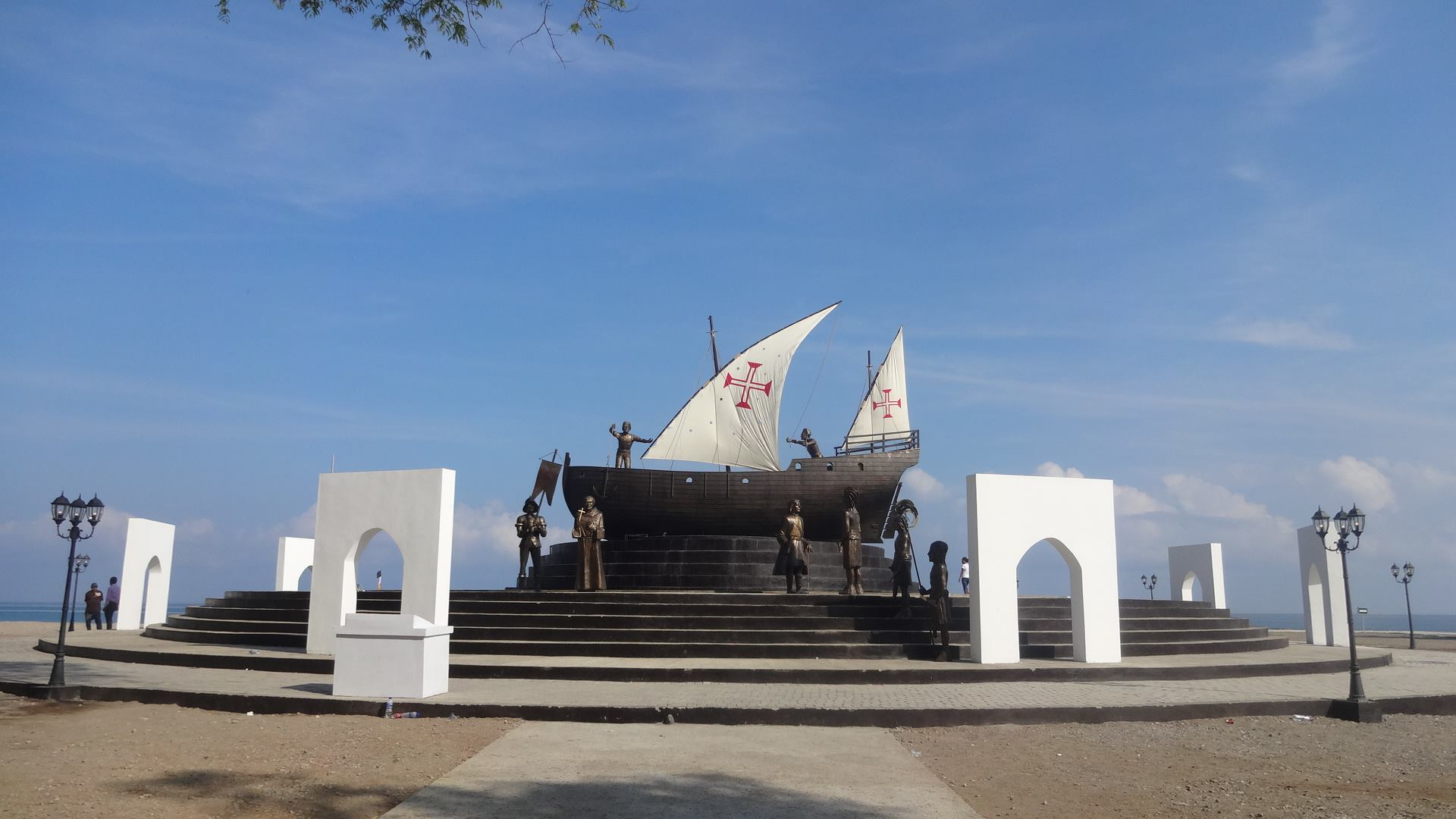
General external view of the monument.

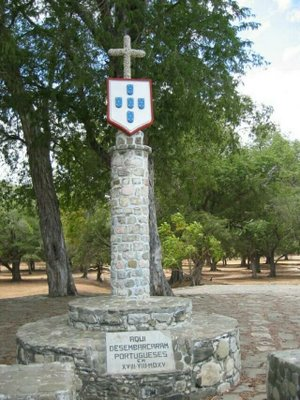
Padrão in Lifau.

The monument was produced in the parish of Oliveira do Douro, located in the municipality of Vila Nova de Gaia, Portugal, and was built next to the Padrão in Lifau, which marked the first Portuguese presence in Timor. The bronze monument takes the form of a caravel, measuring thirteen meters in length, 4.3 meters in height, and 3.2 meters in width, with a weight of eight tonnes. The project was designed by António Veladas and Joaquim de Brito, with casting work carried out by the Fundição Lage. The concept of the "Encounter" was designed by Joaquim de Brito, in collaboration with António Veladas, under a business consortium between their companies, AVAM Consultores Timor and Lorosae Concept Timor. All the works created by the consortium were cast by Fernando da Silva Lage, who also cast the Monument to Pope John Paul II in Tasitolu, sculpted by Alves André.

== See also ==
- Lifau
- Fort Santo António de Lifau
- Portuguese Timor
- Portuguese Empire
