= Fort Santo António de Lifau =

Fort Santo António
- Lifau, Oecusse, Timor-Leste
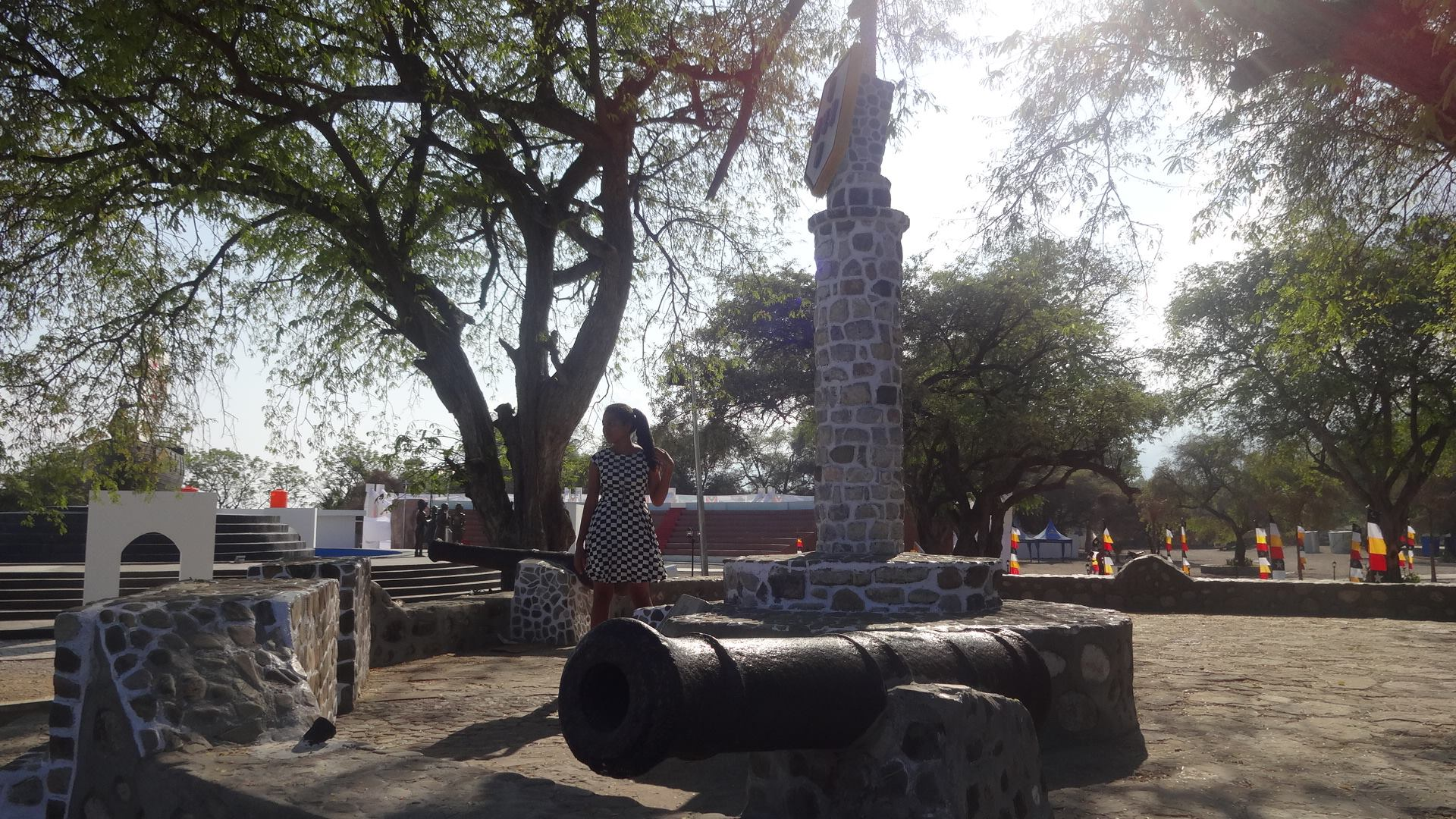
- Monument in Lifau, where the fort used to stand.

Site information
- Condition: Demolished

Location
- Coordinates: 9°13′00″S 124°18′00″E

Site history
- Built: 1702
- Built by: Portuguese Empire

Fort Santo António de Lifau was a Portuguese fort once built by the mouth of the Tono River, in Lifau, district of Oecusse, in East-Timor, the first fort built by the Portuguese Crown, where only forts maintained by Dominican missionaries and Portuguese merchants previously existed.

== History ==
Although the island of Timor was first featured on a Portuguese map from 1512, the arrival of the Portuguese to Lifau occurred on August 18, 1515.

Later, Dominican missionaries subject to the Vicariate of the Order in Portuguese Malacca, began the work of proselytization on the north coast of the island after 1556, as a catechist branch of the mission on the island of Flores. In 1641 the missionaries landed in Lifau and baptized the royal family of Ambeno.

In 1585, when Portugal was ruled by the Habsburg dynasty, the viceroy of the Portuguese State of India took Solor under his jurisdiction, a fort there having been built and maintained by the Dominicans. In this way, the island of Timor, a missionary dependency of the Dominicans from Solor, entered the sphere of interest of the Crown of Portugal in the Far East.

As a result of the Dutch capturing Kupang in west Timor in 1652, many Portuguese merchants moved to Lifau.

After the signing of the Treaty of The Hague (1661) between Portugal and the Dutch Republic, Lifau became the main port of the Portuguese in the region due to the friendly diplomatical relations with the local queen Mean of Lifau and her minister Ambeno. From 1673 to 1690 Solor, Flores and Timor were, in practice, governed by the "liurai" António d'Horney, who recognized Portuguese suzerainty but did not obey it. From 1690 Domingos da Costa took over this position, with the d'Horneys becoming rulers of the kingdom of Oé-Cussi. Attempts to establish a government were thwarted by the action of Domingos da Costa, who expelled the first Portuguese governor in 1697, and imprisoned the second, sending him back to Macau.

Portuguese rule was established in 1702, after the arrival of António Coelho Guerreiro and the fort built with men and artillery sent from Macau, which remained as the main center of Portuguese activities in the region for more than a century. In addition, a hospital was built and, later, a seminary.

The fort was besieged between 1702 and 1704 by liurai Domingos da Costa. Lifau was attacked in 1751 by rebellious Timorese chiefs, and only the arrival of a new governor with military reinforcements in 1734 postponed the planned abandonment of the fort. Later, in 1769, the "liurai" Francisco d'Horney, attacked the fort again, leading to its abandonment and the transfer of the capital to Dili. By the order to evacuate the stronghold on August 11, 1769, Governor António José Teles de Meneses determined to raze the fort.

From then on, Lifau lost importance, as the Portuguese preferred to settle a few kilometers to the east, in Pante Macassar. A fort was later built there.

Like the rest of East Timor, Lifau was occupied in 1975 by Indonesian forces.

Currently, an old piece of artillery on the site recalls the Portuguese presence.

== Characteristics ==
The fort had a quadrangular plan. It was built of earth and loose stone by the sea, with four bastions at the edges and was equipped with nine guns. A barracks and a church had been erected under the invocation of Saint Anthony within.

== See also ==
- Portuguese Timor
- History of East Timor
- List of colonial governors of Portuguese Timor
