= Padiae =

Coordinates: 9°15′S 124°21′E

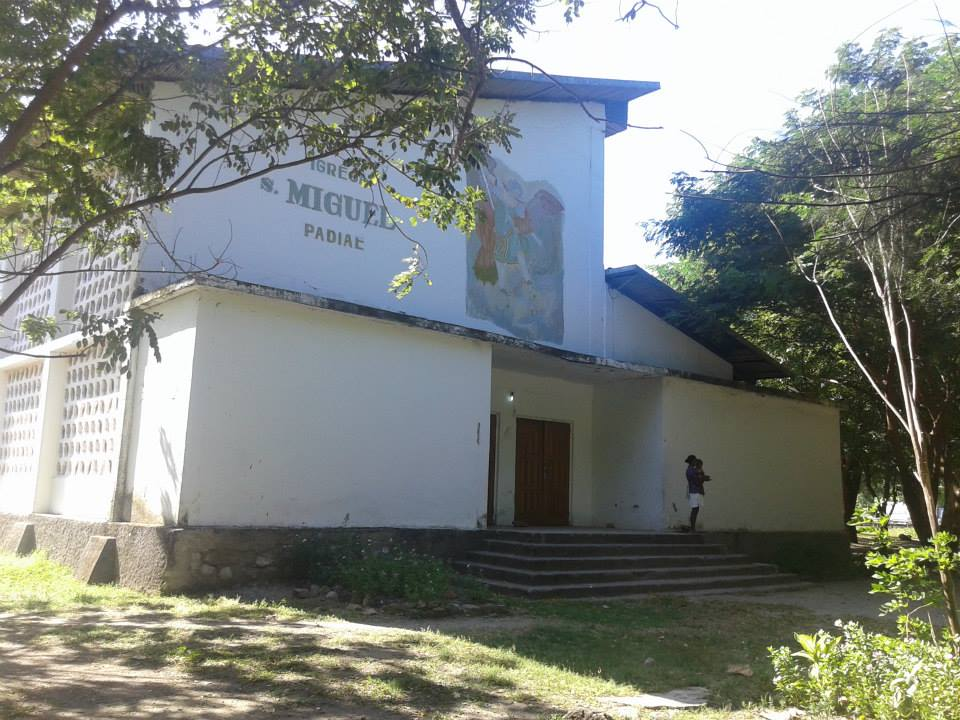
Sao Miguel Church in Padiae

Padiae is a small town in the East Timor exclave of Oecussi-Ambeno. It is located inland from Lifau, on the Tono River. The town of Pasar Tono lies just to the south.
