= Pasar Tono =

Coordinates: 9.255°S 124.349°E

Pasar Tono is a small town in the East Timor exclave of Oecussi-Ambeno. It is located inland from Lifau, on the Tono River. The town of Padiae lies just to the north.
