= Boavida =

Boavida is a surname. Notable people with the surname include:

- Américo Boavida (1923–1968), Angolan physician
- Fernando Boavida (born 1959), Portuguese computer scientist
- Madalena Boavida, East Timorese politician
- Matías Boavida (born 1968), East Timorese politician and academic
