= Pante Macassar =

Pante Macassar Pante Macassar (Portuguese) Pante-Makasár (Tetum) Pante Makassar (Indonesian) Oecussi Vila Taveiro
- City
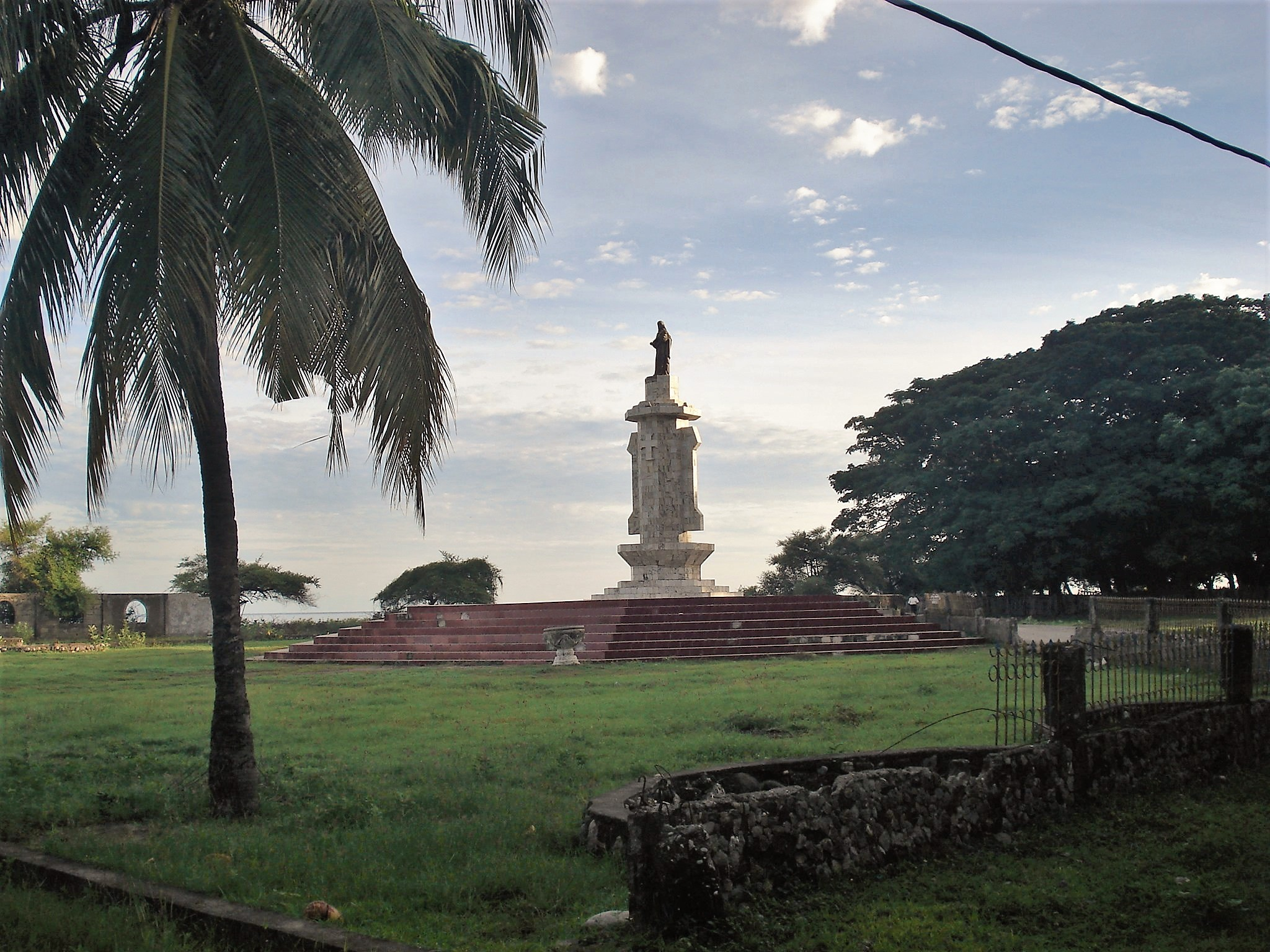

- Location in Timor-Leste
- Coordinates: 9°12′S 124°23′E
- Country: Timor-Leste
- Municipality: Oecusse
- Administrative post: Pante Macassar

Area
  - Total: 357.30 km^{2} (137.95 sq mi)
- Elevation: 189 m (620 ft)

Population (2015 census)
  - Total: 12,352
  - Density: 34.570/km^{2} (89.537/sq mi)
- Time zone: UTC+09:00 (TLT)
- Climate: Aw

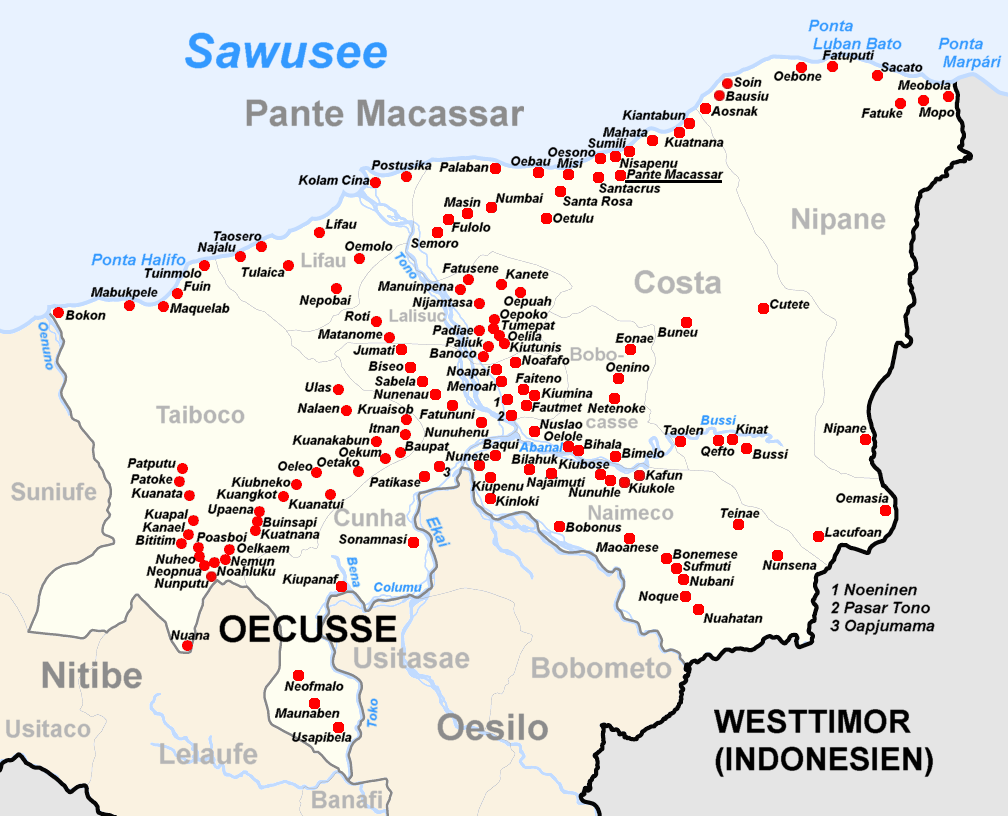
Map of Pante Macassar subdistrict

Pante Macassar (Portuguese: Pante Macassar, Tetun: Pante-Makasár, Indonesian: Pante Makassar) is a city in the Pante Macassar administrative post on the north coast of Timor-Leste, 152 kilometres or 94 miles to the west of Dili, the nation's capital. It has a population of 4,730 (Stand 2006). It is the capital of the Oecusse exclave (former Oecussi-Ambeno).

== Name ==
The name literally means "beach of Makassar", alluding to the erstwhile trade with Makassar in Sulawesi (South Celebes), named by settlers who settled here seasonally in earlier centuries while waiting for the right winds to return home. Locally Pante Macassar is known also as "Oecussi," which is commonly translated as "water pot", and was the name of one of the two original kingdoms that form the exclave. The other was Ambeno. During the Portuguese colonisation, the city was also known as Vila Taveiro.

== Geography ==
Pante Macassar is located on the Sawu Sea in Suco Costa, 281 km west of Dili, near the north coast of the island, at an altitude of 189 metres above sea level. It consists of a series of loosely connected hamlets that reach as far west as the Tono River, which spans the Noefefan Bridge.

== History ==
On the coast near Pante Macassar lies Oesono, where the Kingdom of Oecussi had its seat. The kingdom was ruled by Topasses. The Topasses were descendants of Portuguese soldiers, sailors and traders who married women from Solor. They had a decisive influence on developments on Timor in the 17th and 18th centuries. 6 kilometres west of the present-day town of Pante Macassar, Dominicans founded the town of Lifau in 1556 to secure the sandalwood trade. From 1702 onwards, Lifau, in the outskirts of the present city, was the place where the Portuguese first disembarked on Timor and was the first capital of Portuguese Timor. It continued as capital until 1769, when that was transferred to Dili because of constant attacks from the Topasses.

In May 1912, during the great Manufahi rebellion, there was also an uprising against the colonial rulers in Oecussi. The rebellion was put down with the support of the gunboat Pátria.

In the turmoil of the last months of Portuguese rule over East Timor, due to its distance from the remainder of East Timor, Oecussi-Ambeno, and specifically Pante Macassar, became the first territory occupied by Indonesia on 29 November 1975. Indonesia occupied Oe-Cusse Ambeno as early as 6 June 1975. When Fretilin finally declared East Timor independent from Portugal on 28 November 1975, the Indonesian flag was planted in Pante Macassar the following day. The invasion of the rest of East Timor began on 7 December 1975.

During the 1999 East Timorese crisis, which followed the independence referendum, Pante Macassar was targeted by pro-Indonesian militias, supported by the Indonesian military. 65 civilians who supported independence were hanged, and most of Pante Macassar was burned to the ground, except for two churches.

Twice a week, a ferry boat from Dili arrives, for a journey that takes 12 hours.

== Climate ==
As is typical of the north coast of Timor, Pante Macassar has a tropical savanna climate (Köppen Aw) with a wet season from December to March and a long dry season from April to November.

Climate data for Pante Macassar
Month	Jan	Feb	Mar	Apr	May	Jun	Jul	Aug	Sep	Oct	Nov	Dec	Year
Mean daily maximum °C (°F)	29.9 (85.8)	29.4 (84.9)	29.9 (85.8)	30.7 (87.3)	30.9 (87.6)	30.4 (86.7)	29.8 (85.6)	29.6 (85.3)	29.6 (85.3)	30.0 (86.0)	30.7 (87.3)	30.3 (86.5)	30.1 (86.2)
Daily mean °C (°F)	27.3 (81.1)	26.6 (79.9)	26.6 (79.9)	26.9 (80.4)	26.9 (80.4)	26.2 (79.2)	25.3 (77.5)	25.0 (77.0)	25.2 (77.4)	26.3 (79.3)	27.7 (81.9)	27.7 (81.9)	26.5 (79.7)
Mean daily minimum °C (°F)	24.7 (76.5)	23.8 (74.8)	23.4 (74.1)	23.1 (73.6)	22.9 (73.2)	22.0 (71.6)	20.8 (69.4)	20.5 (68.9)	20.9 (69.6)	22.6 (72.7)	24.8 (76.6)	25.1 (77.2)	22.9 (73.2)
Average rainfall mm (inches)	260 (10.2)	214 (8.4)	150 (5.9)	57 (2.2)	37 (1.5)	18 (0.7)	17 (0.7)	7 (0.3)	1 (0.0)	12 (0.5)	48 (1.9)	167 (6.6)	988 (38.9)
Source: Climate-Data.org
