= Pante Macassar Administrative Post =

Administrative post in Oecusse Municipality, Timor-Leste

Pante Macassar
- Administrative Post
- Posto Administrativo de Pante Macassar (Portuguese); Postu administrativu Pante-Makasár (Tetum)
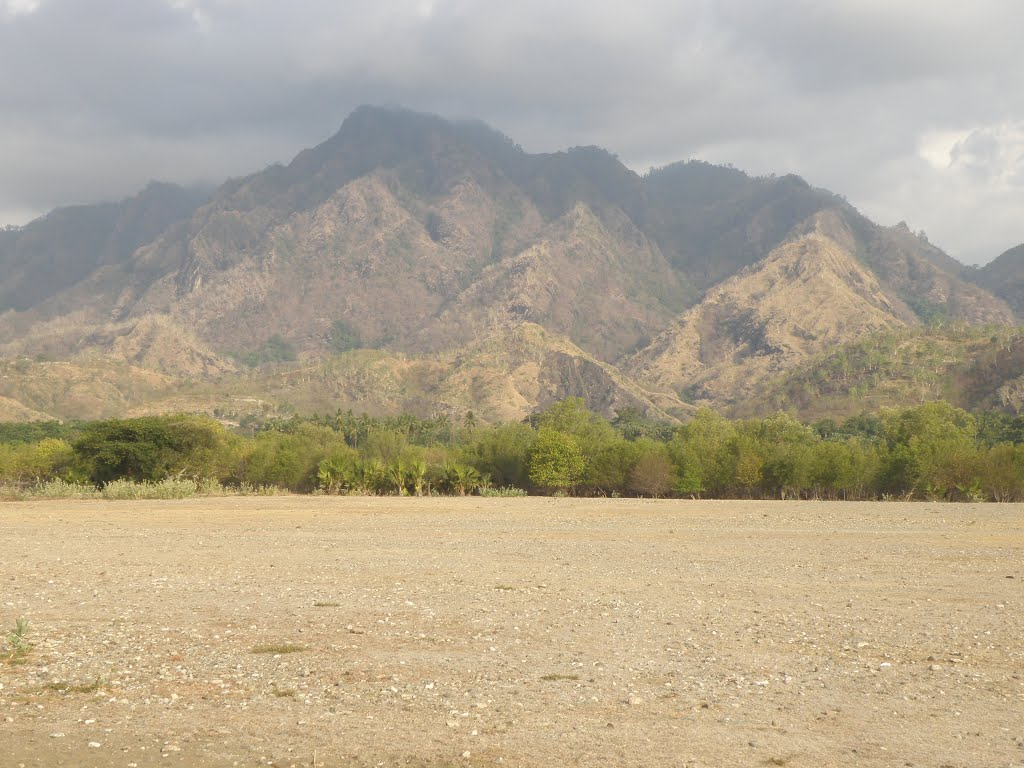
- Grazing land and hills at Pante Macassar

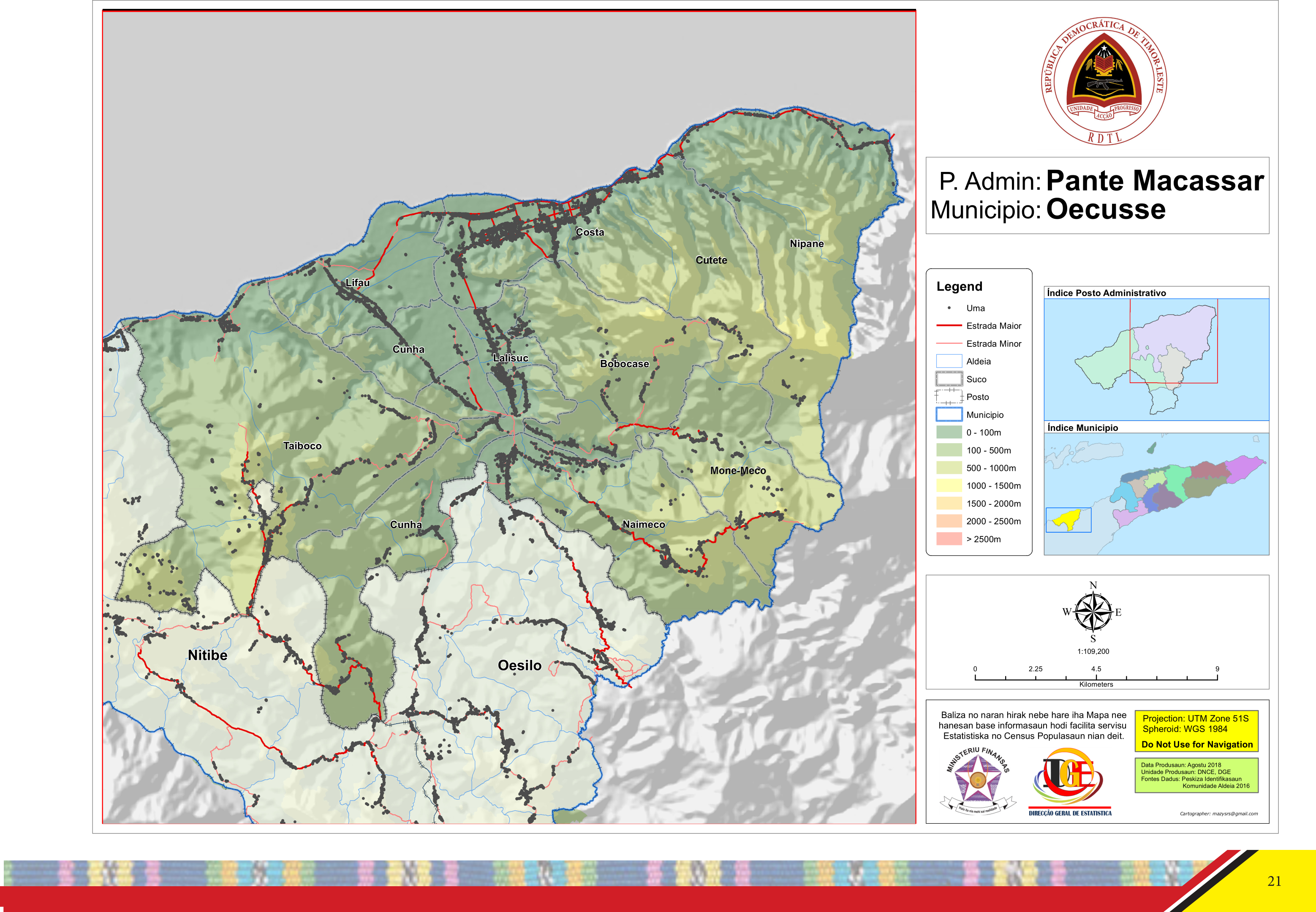
- Official map

- Location within East Timor
- Coordinates: 9°12′S 124°23′E
- Country: Timor-Leste
- Municipality: Oecusse
- Seat: Costa
- Sucos: Bobocasse; Costa; Cutete; Cunha; Lalisuc; Lifau; Mone-Meco; Naimeco; Nipane; Taiboco

Area
  - Total: 356.6 km^{2} (137.7 sq mi)

Population (2015 census)
  - Total: 37,280
  - Density: 104.5/km^{2} (270.8/sq mi)

Households (2015 census)
  - Total: 7,285
- Time zone: UTC+09:00 (TLT)

Pante Macassar, officially Pante Macassar Administrative Post (Portuguese: Posto Administrativo de Pante Macassar, Tetum: Postu administrativu Pante-Makasár), is an administrative post (and was formerly a subdistrict) in the Oecusse municipality and Special Administrative Region (SAR) of Timor-Leste. Its seat or administrative centre is the suco of Costa.
