= Fernando Boavida =

Portuguese computer scientist

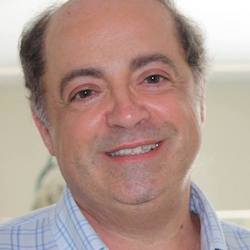
- Born: Fernando Boavida; 5 June 1959 (age 67); Pinhal Novo, Palmela, Portugal
- Citizenship: Portuguese
- Known for: Research on computer networks, Internet of Things and telematics
- Scientific career
- Fields: Computer networks, Wireless sensor networks, Internet of Things, and Information and Communications Technology
- Institutions: University of Coimbra
- Thesis: Communication Systems Management - Architecture and Practical Cases (1990)
- Website: Fernando Boavida's site at the University of Coimbra

Fernando Boavida (Full name: Fernando Pedro Lopes Boavida Fernandes; born 5 June 1959 in Pinhal Novo, Palmela, Portugal) is a Portuguese computer scientist, informatics engineer, university professor, and writer, recognized as a pioneer of network science research and internet in the University of Coimbra and in Portugal.

== Life and career ==
Fernando Boavida received his B.Sc. in electrical engineering in 1982, from the University of Coimbra, where he ranked first in his course. He subsequently concluded his M.Sc. in Telecommunications in 1986 and his PhD in Informatics Engineering in 1990, both from the referred university. He currently is full professor at the Department of Informatics Engineering (DEI) of the Faculty of Sciences and Technology of the University of Coimbra.

Still as an electrical engineering student, he was one of the winners of the first Portuguese Mathematics Mini-Olympics, organized by the Portuguese Mathematics Society in 1980. Also as a B.Sc. student, he was involved in the design of the first Portuguese personal computer, ENER 1000, in the early 1980s, and later, during his M.Sc., developed the network interface card for this computer, which implemented a token bus medium access control protocol entirely developed by him.

Due to his early involvement in computer networking and the Internet in the late 1980s, through associations such as IFIP, RARE (Réseaux Associés pour la Recherche Européenne, later named TERENA), and EWOS (European Workshop for Open Systems), he was, along with his colleague Edmundo Monteiro. In 1990 he was appointed responsible for the University of Coimbra point of presence in the national academic network, RCTS, and in the Internet.

He was co-proposer and co-founder of the Department of Informatics Engineering of the University of Coimbra, created by deliberation of the university's Senate on 13 December 1994. He was the founder, in 1991, of the Laboratory of Communications and Telematics (LCT) of the Centre for Informatics and Systems of the University of Coimbra, (CISUC), the Strategic Director for Communications and Information Technology of the University of Coimbra from October 2003 to December 2015, the Director of the Department of Informatics Engineering from February 2004 to January 2008, the chairman of the Board of the Coimbra Digital Region Association from June 2009 to October 2010, and the Director of CISUC from October 2013 to September 2015.

Fernando Boavida participated in or directed 40 advanced research projects, mainly in the Framework Programmes for Research and Technological Development of the European Union ESPRIT, RACE, ACTS, IST and ICT. He was co-founder of the ACM CoNEXT conference series, and chaired prestigious international conferences such as QofIS 2001, IDMS-PROMS 2002, NETWORKING 2006, WWIC 2007, FMN 2008, EWSN 2010, FMN 2012, IWQoS 2012, ACM SIGCOMM FhMN 2013, Mobiquitous 2015, and WoWMoM 2016. He authored/co-authored more than 170 international publications (books, book chapters, refereed journal articles, and conference proceedings papers) and 50 national publications. He is the author of four textbooks in Portuguese widely used as course books in universities and polytechnic schools of Portuguese-speaking countries, in the areas of computer networks engineering, computer networks administration, TCP/IP networking, and wireless sensor networks. Collectively, these books have sold more than 25,000 copies since the year 2000. He is also co-author of a series of e-books on computer networking, written in Spanish (Redes de Ordenadores).

He is a senior member of the IEEE and a licensed Professional Engineer. He is a member of the editorial advisory board of the Computer Communications Journal. since 1999.
