= Costa, Pante Macassar =

Costa
- Suco
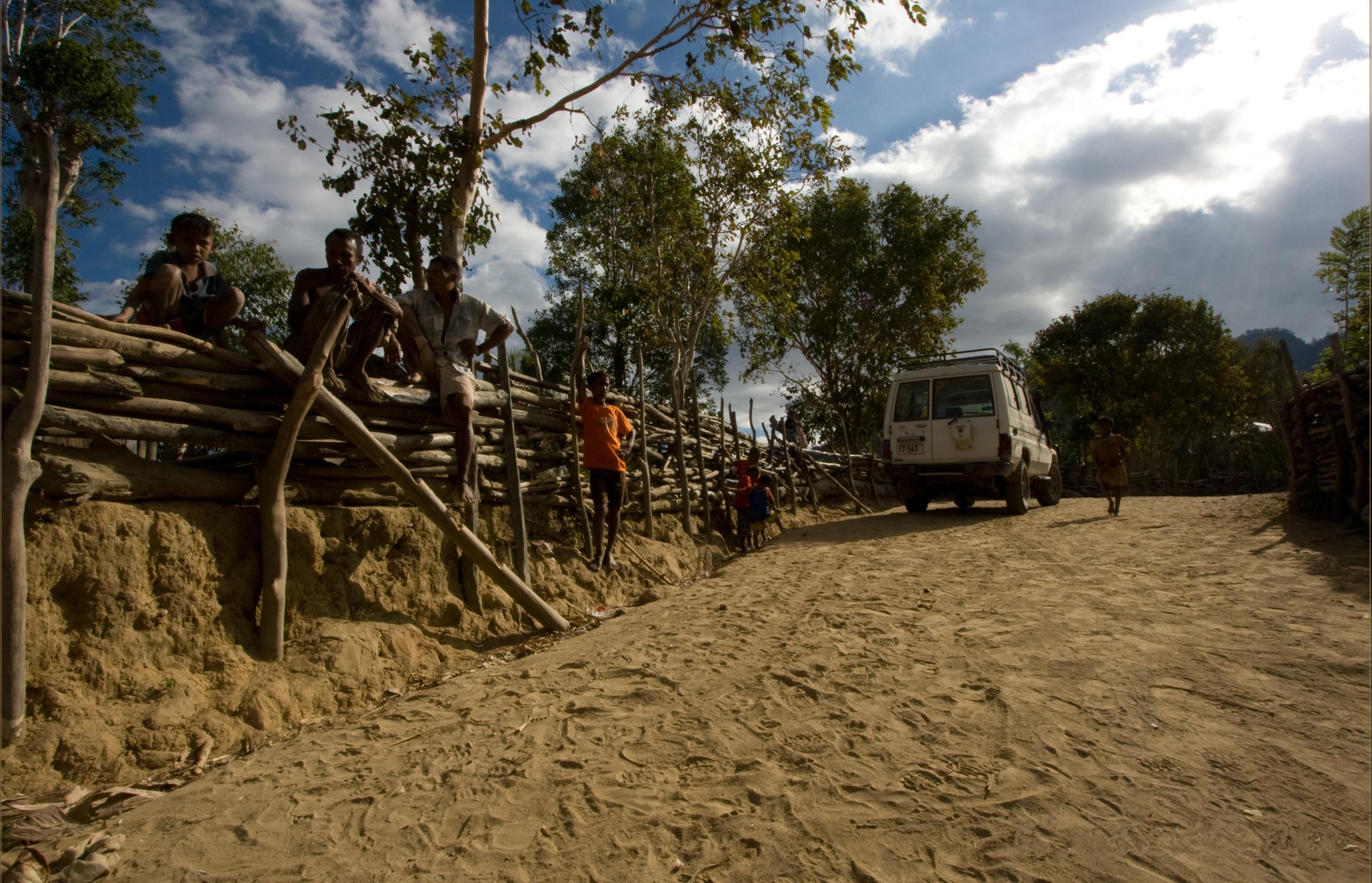

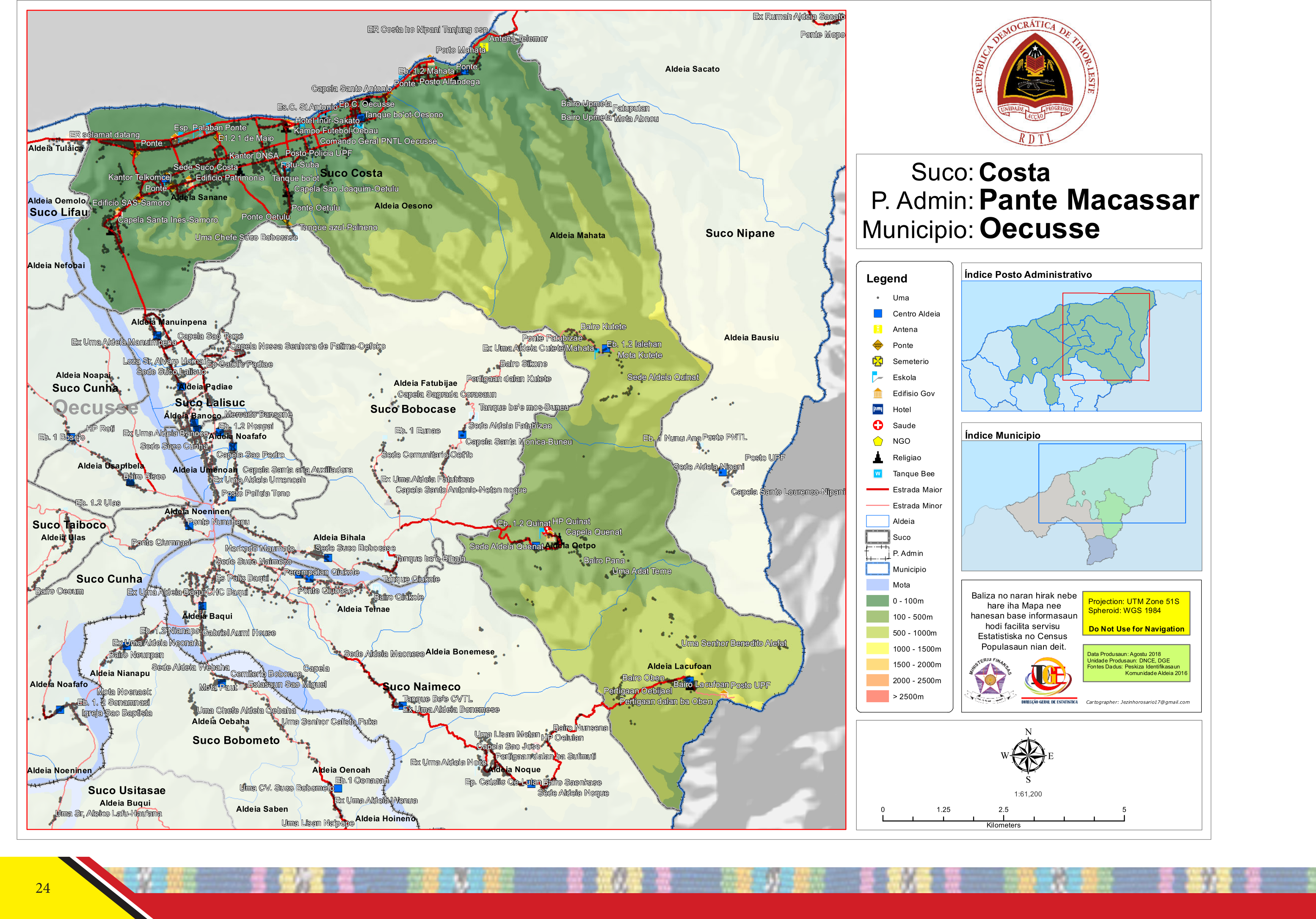
- The suco of Costa
- Country: Timor-Leste
- Municipality: Oecusse
- Administrative post: Pante Macassar

Government

Area
  - Total: 78.04 km^{2} (30.13 sq mi)

Population
  - Total: 14,350

Costa is a suco in the Pante Macassar Administrative Post of the Special Administrative Region Oecusse-Ambeno, Timor-Leste.
