= Tono River =

River in Oecusse, Timor-Leste

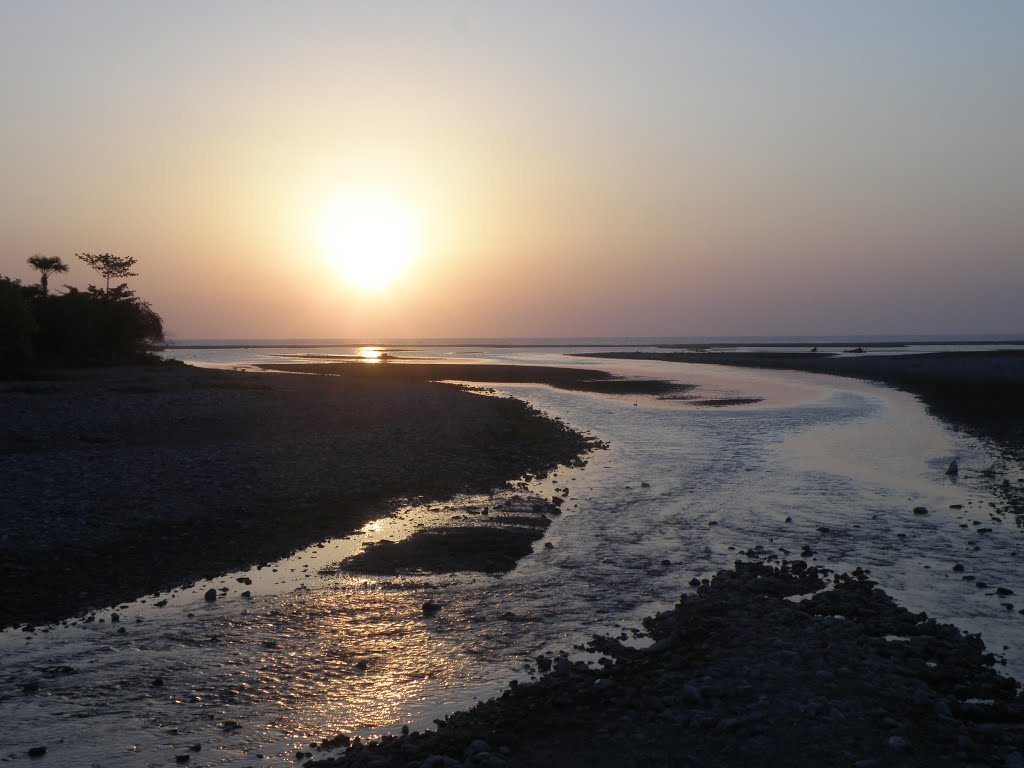
- Tono River estuary

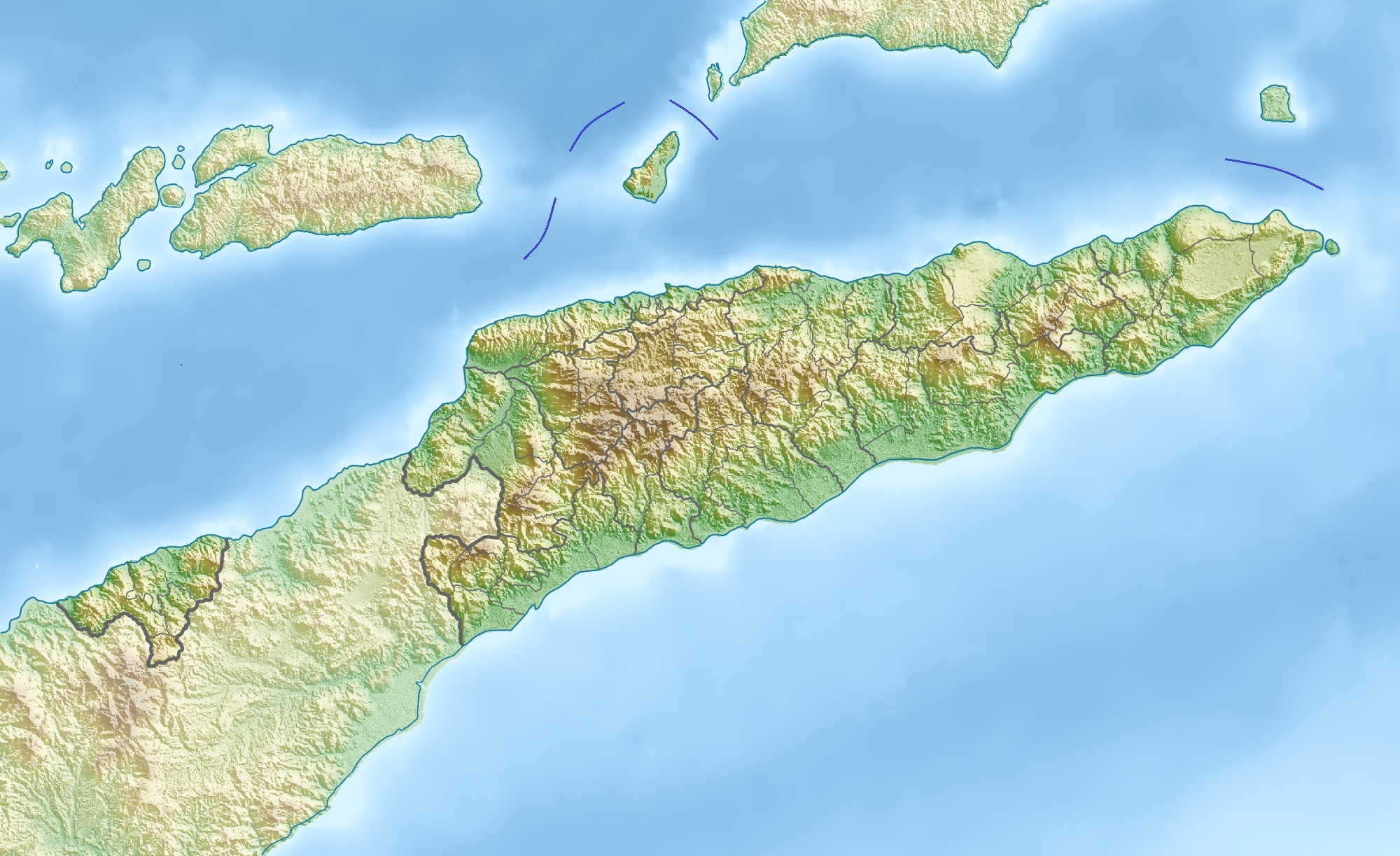
- Location of river mouth
- Native name: Ribeira de Tono /; Rio Tono (Portuguese); Mota Tono (Tetum)

Location
- Country: Timor-Leste
- Municipality: Oecusse

Physical characteristics
- Source confluence
  - location: Tripoint of Suco Bobometo, Oesilo, and Sucos Cunha and Naimeco, Pante Macassar
  - coordinates: 9°16′31″S 124°21′16″E
- Mouth: Savu Sea
  - location: Lifau
  - coordinates: 9°12′31″S 124°18′12″E

Basin features
- Tributaries
  - left: Bitaklele River / Malelai (or Malelui) / Toko / Bena / Columu / Ekai / Kinloki Rivers
  - right: Abanal River
- Bridges: Noefefan Bridge

The Tono River (Portuguese: Ribeira de Tono or Rio Tono, Tetum: Mota Tono) is the principal river of Oecusse, an exclave of Timor-Leste. The river and its major tributaries flow generally north, through the centre of the exclave, into the Savu Sea, reaching the sea near Lifau. Its alluvial flood plain in Pante Macassar administrative post is the main rice-producing place in Oecusse.

== Course ==
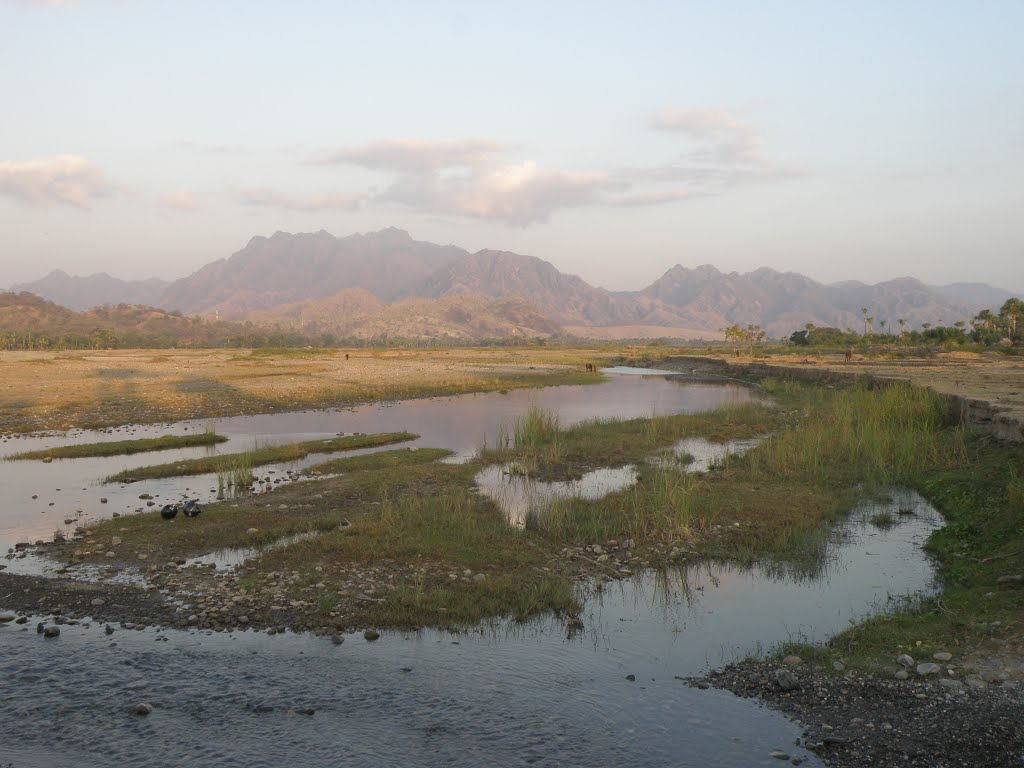
A view of the river looking upstream towards the central mountains

The river is one of Timor-Leste's few perennial streams. Its primary headwaters are in the portion of Timor-Leste's central mountains located within the southern ends of Nitibe and Oesilo administrative posts in Oeucusse.

In general, the river's tributaries flow from the headwaters in a northeasterly direction, mostly along the border between Oesilo and Pante Macassar administrative posts, until two of the tributaries (the Ekai and Abanel rivers) merge near the northwesternmost point of Suco Bobometo in Oesilo to form the river itself. From there, the river continues, as the principal river of the Oecusse exclave, in a different, northwesterly, direction, until it discharges into the Savu Sea a short distance southwest of Lifau, Pante Macassar administrative post.

Approximately 0.5 km (0.31 mi) upstream and to the east of the river mouth is the 380 m-long (1,250 ft) Noefefan Bridge over the river. The bridge connects Citrana, Passabe and other isolated regions west of the river to Oecusse's capital, Pante Macassar, providing them with permanent access to markets, the ferry, and airport, even during the rainy season (November to April).

The river's main tributaries, in order of entrance, are as follows:

- Bitaklele River: rises as its tributaries the Bao, Matin and Upun Rivers, respectively, in Suco Lelaufe, Nitibe administrative post, where it also has its source convergence; flows generally eastwards, to the tripoint between Nitibe, Oesilo and Pante Macassar administrative posts, where it merges with the Malelai (or Malelui) River (see below) to form the Toko River (see below);
- Malelai (or Malelui) River: rises not far from the southern end of the border between Nitibe and Pante Macassar administrative posts; flows generally northwestwards, to the Nitibe / Oesilo / Pante Macassar tripoint, where it merges with Bitaklele River (see above) to form the Toko River (see below);
- Toko River: flows from the confluence of the Bitaklele and Malelai (or Malelui) Rivers (see above) generally northwards, along the border between Oesilo and Pante Macassar administrative posts, until it merges with the Bena River (see below) to form the Columu River (see below);
- Bena River: rises in Suco Cunha, Pante Macassar administrative post; flows a short distance southeastwards to the border between Oesilo and Pante Macassar administrative posts, where it merges with the Toko River (see above) to form the Columu River (see below);
- Columu River: flows from the confluence of the Toko and Bena Rivers (see above) generally eastwards, along the border between Oesilo and Pante Macassar administrative posts, to the tripoint between Sucos Bobometo and Usitasae, Oesilo administrative post, and Suco Cunha, Pante Macassar administrative post, where it enters the Ekai River (see below);
- Ekai River: rises as the Passabe River and its tributaries in the south of Passabe administrative post, Timor-Leste; flows initially eastwards through Passabe and over the international frontier into North Central Timor Regency, Indonesia; continues northeastwards, and then northwestwards, through North Central Timor Regency; then, as the Ekai River, passes along and over the international frontier, and across Sucos Bobometo and Usitasae, Oesilo administrative post, Timor-Leste, to the tripoint between Sucos Bobometo and Usitasae, and Suco Cunha, Pante Macassar administrative post (which is also the location of the Columu River mouth (see above)); and finally heads northwards, to the tripoint between Suco Bobometo, Oesilo administrative post, and Sucos Cunha and Naimeco, Pante Macassar administrative post, where it merges with the Abanal River (see below) to form the Tono River;
- Kinloki River: rises as the Bimilo River near the international frontier between Naimeco, Pante Macassar administrative post, Timor-Leste, and North Central Timor Regency, Indonesia; flows initially southwestwards along that frontier, and then northwestwards along the border between Suco Bobometo, Oesilo administrative post, and Suco Naimeco, to the tripoint between Sucos Bobometo and Naimeco, and Suco Cunha, Pante Macassar administrative post, where it enters the Ekai River (see above);
- Abanal River: rises as the Bussi River in Suco Costa, Pante Macassar administrative post, flows generally westwards, mainly as the Abanal River along the border between Sucos Bobocasse and Naimeco, Pante Macassar, to the tripoint between Suco Bobometo, Oesilo administrative post, and Sucos Cunha and Naimeco, Pante Macassar, where it merges with the Ekai River (see above) to form the Tono River.

== History ==
Lifau, a short distance northeast of the Tono River mouth, was the first place on the island of Timor to be settled by Europeans. Between 1512 and 1515, Portuguese traders were the first of the Europeans to arrive in the area; they landed near modern Pante Macassar, about 5 km (3.1 mi) to Lifau's east. Only much later was a permanent Portuguese settlement established at Lifau.

By the seventeenth century, the Lifau settlement had become the centre of Portuguese activities on Timor, which had extended into the interior of the island. In 1702, Lifau officially became the capital of all Portuguese dependencies in the Lesser Sunda Islands. However, Portuguese control over Lifau's environs, known as Oecusse (which is also the traditional name of Pante Macassar), was tenuous, particularly in the mountainous interior. In 1769, the capital of Portuguese Timor was transferred from Lifau eastwards to Dili, due to frequent attacks from the local Eurasian Topass group. Most of West Timor was left to Dutch forces, who were conquering what is today Indonesia.

In the 1780s, a reconciliation took place between the governor in Dili and the Topasses of Oecusse, who henceforth usually supported the Portuguese government. In 1859, under the Treaty of Lisbon, Portugal and the Netherlands divided the island between them. For the most part, West Timor became Dutch, with its colonial seat at Kupang. Eastern Timor became Portuguese, with its seat in Dili. Oecusse was confirmed as a Portuguese exclave, with the Savu Sea to its north west, but otherwise surrounded by Dutch territory.

As is the case throughout the Indonesian archipelago, human settlement in Oecusse, including in the Tono River catchment or drainage basin, has traditionally been concentrated in the mountainous interior, rather than near the coast. There are many likely reasons for this tradition: for example, altitude offers relief from coastal heat and much lower rates of malaria infection, and high ground is easier to defend against invaders. In Oecusse, areas of higher altitude also benefit from substantially greater rainfall over a rainy season that can be two months longer than along the coast, and groundwater reserves are more plentiful. Additionally, the channelling of water for small-scale cultivation is relatively simple in mountainous landscapes.

Many Oecusse communities were among the last in Timor to have contact with foreigners, as Portuguese colonialism after 1769 was focused on the eastern half of the island. Some mountain villages in Oecusse were not reached by Portuguese missionaries until as recently as the 1950s. However, Oecusse still identifies strongly with the former Portuguese Timor, even though the effect of the Portuguese on the culture of the exclave was shallow.

In 1975, Indonesia, which had become independent in 1949, began an invasion of Portuguese Timor, including Oecusse. The Indonesians then proceeded to occupy the former colony. During the occupation, Indonesia maintained Oecusse's administrative links to the rest of the former Portuguese Timor, but some of the residents of Oecusse's mountains were forcibly relocated to the low-lying alluvial flood plains along the Tono River, ostensibly to maximise use of cultivable land, but also to facilitate government control over the community.

In 1999, the East Timorese voted for independence from Indonesia. Before leaving, the Indonesian military and its allies inflicted a scorched earth policy over the whole of the occupied territory, and especially in Oecusse. Since then, some of the forcibly relocated members of Oecusse's community have returned to the mountains. Of those who have stayed in the lowlands, many still consider the mountains to be the centre of their family, social and ritual activities.

When East Timor became independent in 2002, the new Constitution of Timor-Leste expressly provided, in recognition of Oecusse's very longstanding particular disadvantages, that the exclave would "... enjoy special administrative and economic treatment ..." and "... be governed by a special administrative policy and economic regime". In 2013, the government of Timor-Leste appointed former prime minister Mari Alkatiri to oversee the development of a special economic zone in Oecusse. The following year, the National Parliament of Timor-Leste took a further step towards complying with the government's constitutional obligations towards Oecusse, by enacting a law for the creation of an Authority of the Oecusse Special Administrative Region (Portuguese: Autoridade da Região Administrativa Especial Oé-Cusse – ARAEO), and for the designation of Oecusse as a Special Zone of Social Market Economy (Portuguese: Zona Especial de Economia Social de Mercado – ZEESM). On 23 and 24 January 2015, the central government formally handed over some of its powers to the ARAEO and the ZEESM.

Soon after his appointment as the overseer of the special economic zone, Alkatiri started publicising a fully formed plan for Oecusse's development. The plan comprised a substantial number of proposed buildings and capital investments, including a 380 m-long (1,250 ft) bridge over the Tono River on the coastal road between Pante Macassar and Citrana. Construction of the bridge, since named the Noefefan Bridge, began in April 2015. The bridge was formally inaugurated in June 2017.

Meanwhile, in May 2016, a report published by the World Bank proposed a detailed Oecusse Agricultural Development Plan (OADP), costed at US$47.5 million over a ten year implementation period, to promote growth in agriculture and forestry in the exclave. By September 2017, the government had spent approximately US$10 million of that total amount, on rehabilitating and upgrading the Tono irrigation scheme, in particular by building a dam to provide more water, more reliably. The OADP also included provision for a 1,000 ha (2,500 acres) increase in the size of the area irrigated by the scheme, even though the report's authors considered that an increase would be uneconomic; the authors also felt that it was logical to focus on domestic production of import replacements of rice, and maize.

== Catchment ==
The catchment of the Tono River is one of the 10 major catchments in the country. Sources vary as to its size. According to one source, the portion located within Timor-Leste is 499 km^{2} (193 sq mi) in area, and 20% of the catchment (ie another 124.75 km^{2} (48.17 sq mi)) is situated in Indonesia. Another source quantifies the East Timorese portion as being about 509.16 km^{2} (196.59 sq mi) in area.

Timor-Leste has been broadly divided into twelve 'hydrologic units', groupings of climatologically and physiographically similar and adjacent river catchments. The Tono River catchment is one of the two major catchments in the Lifau & Tono Besi hydrologic unit, which is about 837 km^{2} (323 sq mi) in total area, and covers 5.5% of the country; the other one is the Noel Besi River catchment.

== Economy ==
=== Agriculture ===
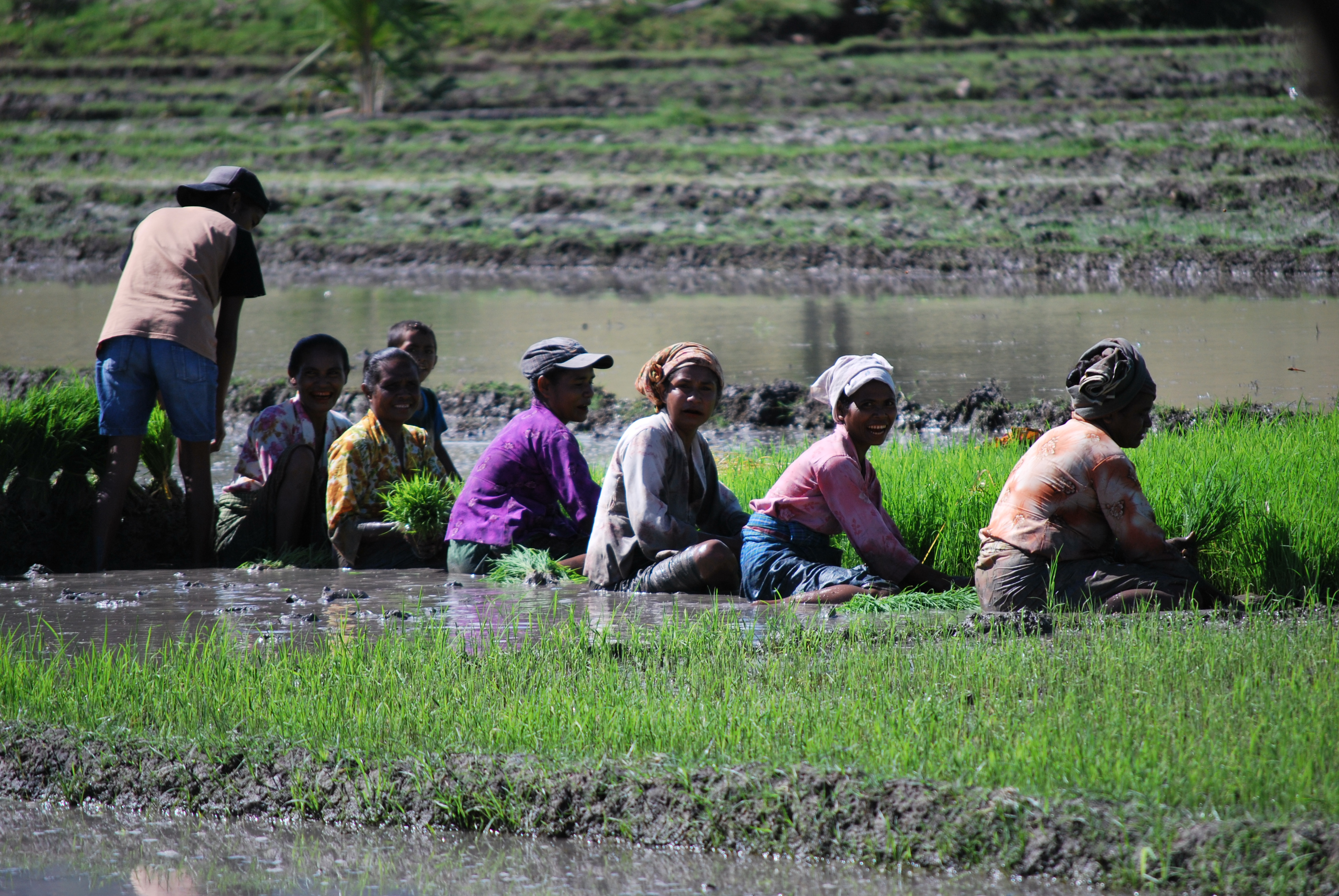
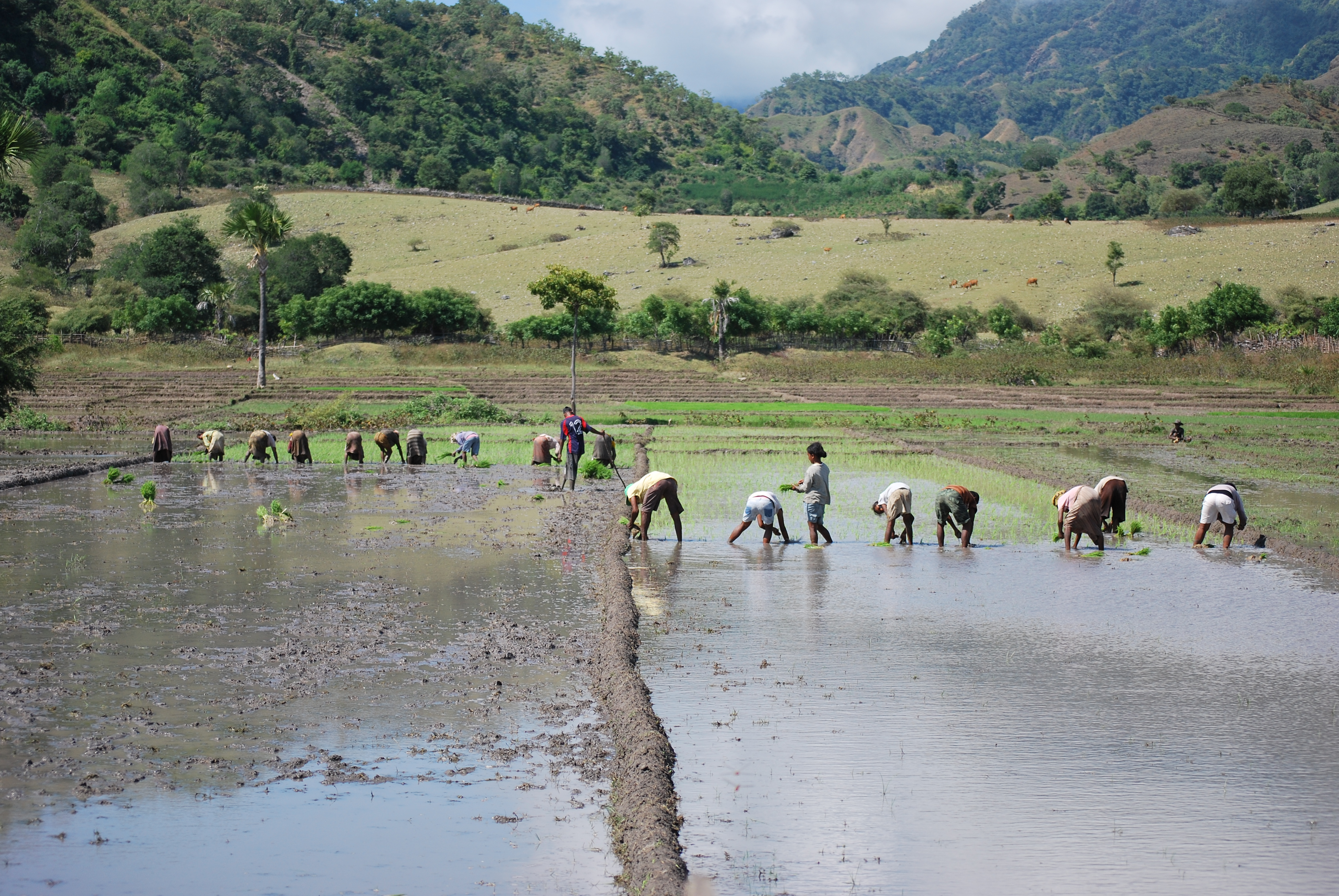
Working rice paddies in Oemelo, Suco Lifau, Pante Macassar administrative post

The vast majority of the residents of Oecusse, including the catchment, have always relied on agriculture as their means of support. As of 2016, 78% of the exclave's population was engaged in agriculture. Subsistence farming is overwhelmingly the leading form of agriculture, and the bartering of goods is very common in its traditional markets. Many of the exclave's families are only marginally integrated into the cash economy; such integration has also lessened since 2002, because of a reduction in the spending power of civil servants, and the erection of border restrictions on imports into West Timor.

The cultivation of maize is the dominant form of agriculture in the upper part of the catchment. The alluvial flood plains of the river in Pante Macassar administrative post, of which about 1,700 ha (4,200 acres) are irrigated by the Tono irrigation scheme, make up Oecusse's 'rice belt', and are also the exclave's most productive agricultural area. The majority of Oecusse's farmers plant small quantities of a wide range of crops at different times to guard against the possibility of total crop failure. In general, inheritance of land and property in the exclave is patrilineal, but in the lowlands, female ownership of irrigated rice fields is common and men will move into their wives' homes upon marriage.

Agricultural or agro-forestry activity in the catchment is made difficult by its dry climate, poor soils and challenging topography, which is generally mountainous with little flat land for large-scale cultivation. The catchment has a long dry season, during which livestock food becomes scarce. The mostly steep topography not only limits arable land, but also causes run-off from heavy rains to remove much of the topsoil. The local people practise rotational cropping to counter the poor soils. However, rotational cropping requires constant clearing of new land, which leads to further environmental degradation, and the use of fertilizers as an alternative to rotational cropping is generally uncommon.

The catchment has also been degraded for centuries by commercial logging of various species, and especially of sandalwood. Oecusse’s sandalwood reserves, unlike those in the rest of Timor, were still substantial in 1975, but were then rapidly depleted, largely by more intrusive, and often corrupt, Indonesian logging practices. In the 2000s, the cutting of several protected tree species in Oecusse was prohibited to combat deforestation, and the allocation of private land to the planting of trees was recommended.

Residents of Oecusse also commonly raise cattle, chickens, pigs, goats and buffalo. They prefer to use livestock as a store of wealth that can be used, eg, to pay a bride price or as insurance against food shortages, and rarely slaughter cattle for their own consumption. After Oecusse's sandalwood industry closed down, cattle became the only significant exports from the exclave. Since 2002, however, difficulties in marketing cattle in Dili, and the effective closure of the borders to West Timor, have presented very substantial obstacles to the export of livestock.

=== Fishing ===
Very little fishing takes place either in or near the catchment, or in Oecusse generally. The people of Oecusse observe the tradition of pemali, which is the prohibition of the eating of certain foods by certain clan groups, and one of the most commonly prohibited foods is seafood. For that reason, there is little incentive to develop seafood markets in Oecusse, and also little historical knowledge that would assist with the easy capture and marketing of fish from the catchment.

=== Town water supply ===
The most reliable source of water for the water supply network in Pante Macassar is the Tono Bore, a deep well situated on the bed of the river near the town's south western corner. The bore was completed in 2003, and initially could be operated on only a limited basis, due to a lack of funding to buy fuel.

== See also ==
- List of rivers of Timor-Leste
