= Citrana =

Town in Timor-Leste

Coordinates: 9°20′S 124°05′E

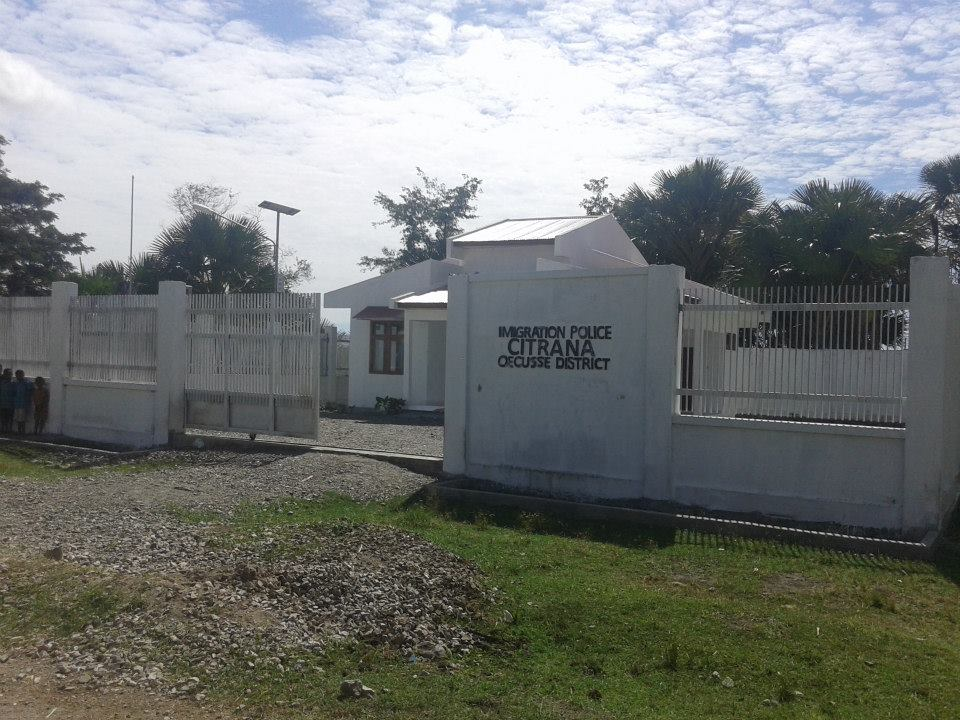
Immigration office in Citrana

Citrana is a small town in the Timor-Leste exclave of Oecusse Special Administrative Region. It is located in the far west of the exclave, close to the mouth of the Noel Besi River, which forms part of the border with Indonesia.
