= Matías Boavida =

East Timorese politician

Matías Freitas Boavida (born 6 November 1968) is a politician and university teacher from East Timor. He is member of the party Fretilin.

Boavida graduated in 1998 in political science from the University of Timor Timur (today National University of East Timor). He received a Diploma in Applied Social Science Methods in 2005 from Charles Darwin University in Darwin, Australia. From 2007, Boavida studied at the Instituto Superior de Ciencias Sociais e Políticas of the Technical University of Lisbon and graduated with a master's degree in 2009.

From 1987 to 1999 Boavida worked in the Indonesian-occupied East Timor as a civil servant. From March 2000 he worked as a lecturer and researcher at the National University of East Timor at the Faculty of Sociology and Policies and at the Center for Gender Studies. From 2000 to 2007 he was also employed in various tasks at the United Nations in East Timor. From January 2001 to May 2004, he served as an administrative assistant to the International Force East Timor and traveled as an election observer to the parliamentary elections in Portugal in 2002. By the end of 2004, Boavida worked as a researcher on the land and property law program before joining the March 2005 participated in a seminar of the Australian Association of Postgraduate Council in New Zealand.

After studying in Lisbon, Boavida worked again as a lecturer at the Faculdade de Ciências Sociais e Políticas of the National University of East Timor. In addition, he took over several other parallel tasks. From March to June 2010, Boavida worked as a researcher on the Advisory Committee of the National Petroleum Fund, from June 2010 to December 2012 as a Public Policy Officer at United Nations Integrated Mission in East Timor, and from January to March 2013 as a member of the advisory team of Finn Reske-Nielsen, the last Special Representative of the Secretary-General for East Timor. From January 2011 to 2015, Boavida headed the Public Policy Department of the Faculty of Social Sciences. Since December 2014, he also worked for Televisão de Timor Leste and from 2017 also on the radio and television program of Radio Televisão Maubere (RTM) as a moderator.

On October 3, Boavida was sworn in to Secretary of State for the Council of Ministers and social communications in the VII. Government of East Timor.

Boavida speaks in addition to Tetum and the East Timorese regional languages Galoli and Makasae still English, Portuguese and Indonesian.
