= Lifau =

Lifau Lifáo, Liphao, Leiffauw
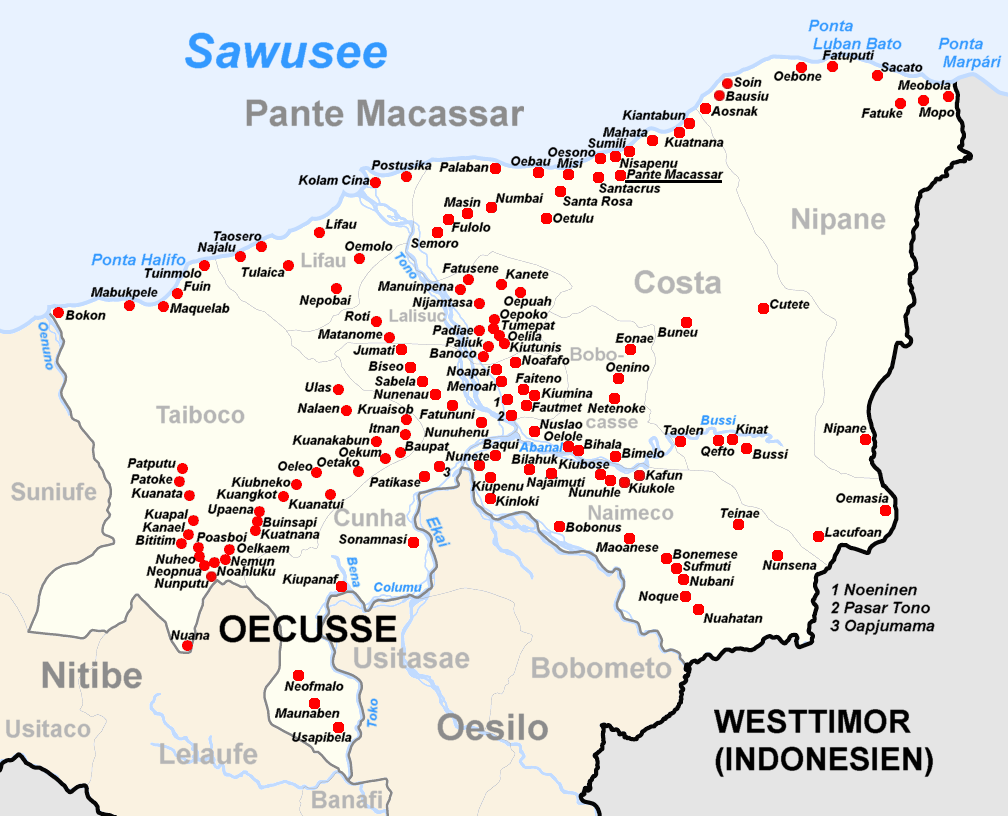
- Suco and village of Lifau in subdistrict of Pante Macassar

- Location in Timor-Leste
- Coordinates: 9°13′0″S 124°18′0″E
- Country: Timor-Leste
- District: Oecusse District
- Subdistrict: Pante Macassar
- Suco: Lifau
- Elevation: 16 ft (5 m)

Population
  - Total: 1,938
  - Ethnicities: Atoin Meto
  - Religions: Catholic

Lifau is a village and suco in the Timor-Leste exclave of Oecusse District. The village is located west of the mouth of the Tono River. 1,938 people live in the suco.

== History ==
Lifau was the first European settlement on the island of Timor. Dominican brothers carried on missionary work on the north coast of Timor after 1556. In 1641 they arrived at Lifau and baptized the royal family of Ambeno. A permanent Portuguese settlement arose in the 1650s, as many Portuguese moved from their old colonial seat Larantuka on Flores to Timor in response to the Dutch colonial settlement in Kupang in westernmost Timor (1653). Lifau remained the centre for Portuguese colonial activities for more than a century, and was headed by a governor after 1702. In 1769 the colonial capital was moved to Dili due to military aggression from the Eurasian Topasses who opposed the politics of the governor. After this date the place lost its significance, since the Topasses preferred to keep their residence in Pante Macassar further to the east.
