= Port of Dili =

Seaport in Dili, Timor-Leste

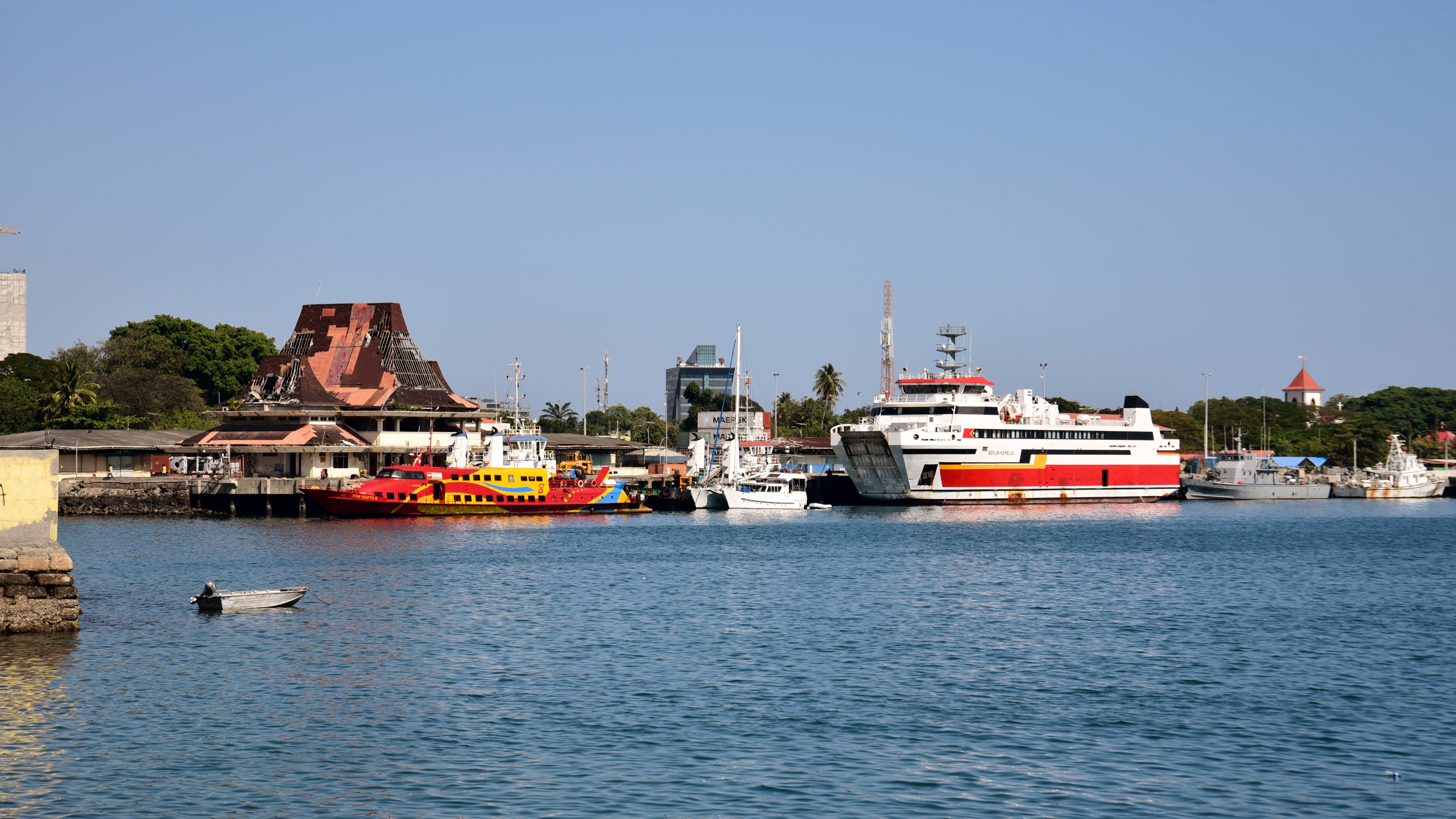
- Passenger vessels moored at the port in 2023
- Interactive map of Port of Dili
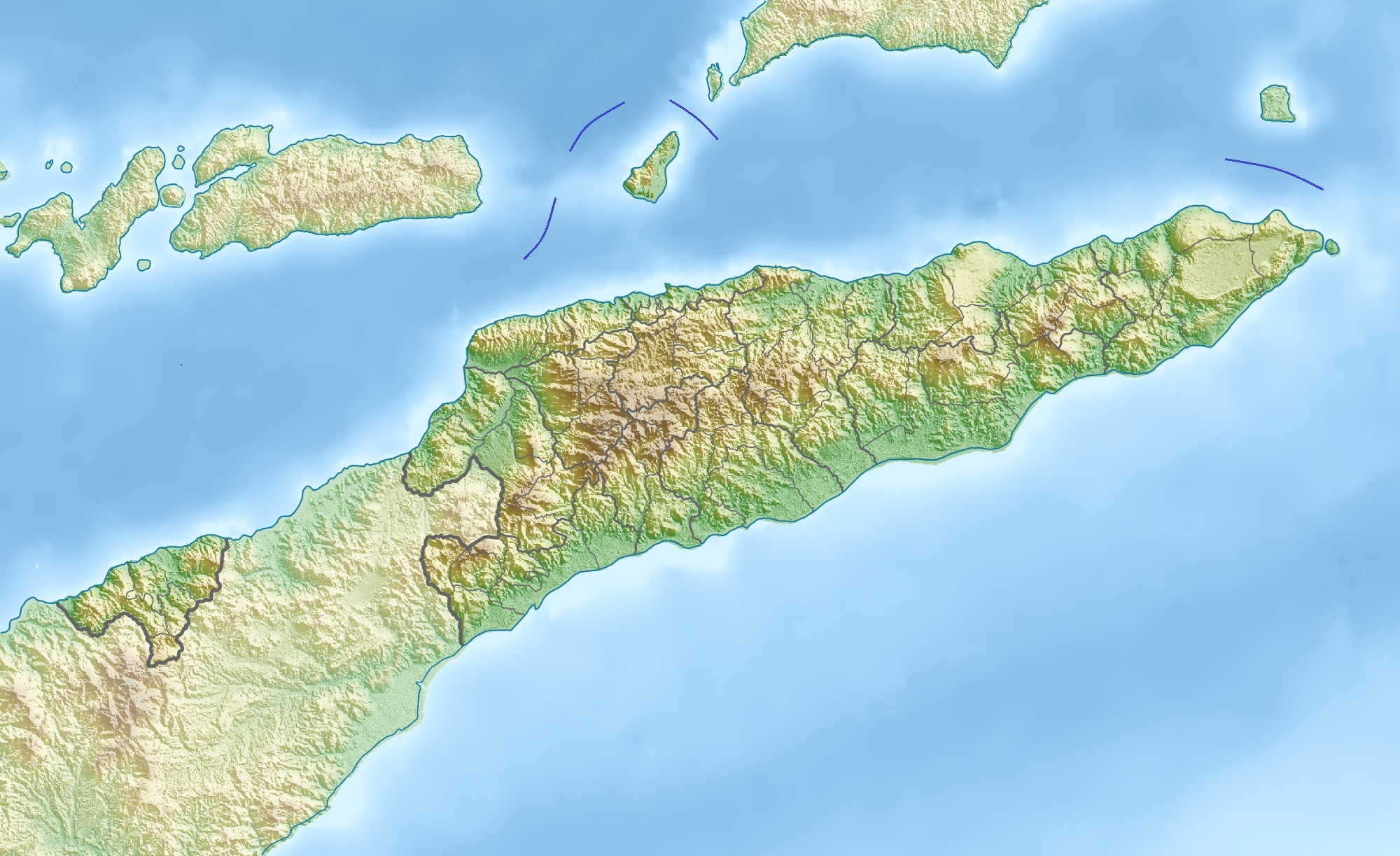
- Location of port in Timor-Leste
- Native name: Porto de Díli (Portuguese); Portu Díli (Tetum)

Location
- Country: Timor-Leste
- Location: Farol, Motael, Dili
- Coordinates: 8°33′6″S 125°34′35″E
- UN/LOCODE: TLDIL

Details
- Operated by: Port Authority of Timor-Leste (APORTIL)
- No. of berths: 3
- No. of wharfs: 280 m (920 ft) total
- Draft depth: 5–9 m (16–30 ft)

Statistics
- Annual cargo tonnage: 225,000; (General cargo); (2014); (Closed to container traffic on 30 September 2022)
- Annual container volume: 51,822 TEU; (2014); (Closed to container traffic on 30 September 2022)
- Passenger traffic: 42,284; (Dili–Oecusse (2014)); 19,923; (Dili–Atauro (2014))

The Port of Dili (Portuguese: Porto de Díli, Tetum: Portu Díli) is a seaport in Dili, Timor-Leste. Prior to 30 September 2022, it was the main and only international port of entry to Timor-Leste. On that day, its container operations were transferred to the Tibar Bay Port. Since then, the Port of Dili's facilities have been open only to domestic passenger ships and cruise ships carrying international tourists.

== Geography ==
The port is located in the neighbourhood of Farol, which is within the suco of Motael. It is on the north side of central Dili, and at the southern extremity of the Bay of Dili, facing Ombai Strait.

Small, open and natural, the port has a sandy seabed dotted with numerous reefs that cause available vessel draft to vary substantially.

A natural reef along the port's perimeter gives protection from the severe weather that can occur during Timor-Leste's annual rainy or monsoon season.

The approach to the port is a narrow passage through two detached reefs visible at low water and marked by beacons. Night entry is not recommended due to the reefs, and also unmarked wrecks, inside the bay. In monsoon season, between November and the end of March, ships in port are slightly exposed to north-westerly winds.

== History ==
=== Portuguese colonial era ===
The place now known as Dili has had a port since at least as far back as 1726. That year, as part of the efforts of the governor of Portuguese Timor, António Moniz de Macedo, sought to put down the Cailaco Rebellion, a force under the command of Goncalo de Magalhaes was assembled at that place, already a Portuguese port of call, to advance upon Cailaco via the heights of Ermera.

In 1769, a later governor of Portuguese Timor, António José Teles de Meneses, sought to break the influence of powerful local families in Lifau, Oecusse, his then residence, by moving the colonial administration and 1,200 people to the site of what would become Dili.

According to John Crawfurd, writing in 1820, between 10 and 12 English ships would put in to Dili each year to re-provision during the British occupation of the Moluccas between 1810 and 1814.

The Plano do Porto e Cidade de Dilly, a map of Dili published by T. Andrea and T. Machado in 1870, confirms that the hydrographic charting of the harbour had been completed, and that the anchorage was protected by a lighthouse on one side and a fortaleza named Carqueto on the other. Also depicted in the map is a ponte (transl. jetty) named after Dom Luís I.

At least from the 1860s onwards, Europeans who visited Dili via its port in the 19th century tended to write negatively about the locality's poor state of public health, surrounded as it was by swamps and mud flats. So, eg, Anna Forbes, wife of Henry Ogg Forbes, commented in the 1880s that:

"No traveller will of choice visit Dilly, for its reputation as the unhealthiest port of the archipelago is not undeserved, and the report that one night passed in its miasmal atmosphere may result fatally deters any who would, except of necessity, go there ..."

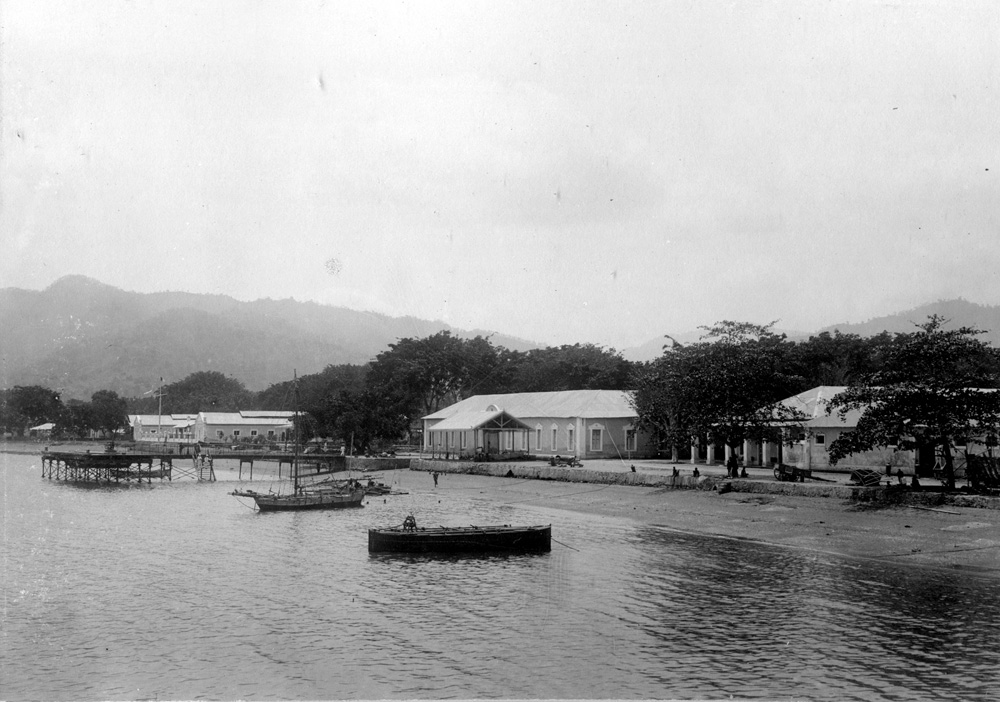
The port's jetty and waterfront buildings, c. 1901

Until well into the twentieth century, the port facilities at Dili were minimal. Prior to 1964, when the first substantial wharf was completed, vessels calling at the port had to rely upon barges for loading and unloading.

Such minimal facilities as existed at the port immediately before the start of the Battle of Timor in 1942 were extensively damaged during that battle, and the Japanese occupation of the Dutch East Indies that followed it. More than a decade after World War II ended, the port was restored under governor Colonel Filipe Temudo Barata (1959–1963). Later, under governor José Alberty Correia (1963–1968), it was modernised and expanded. With new warehouses, it became able to serve ships up to 7,000 GRT, such as the India and the Timor of the Companhia Colonial de Navegação. Historian Geoffrey Gunn has asserted that "[t]he development of Dili's port facilities in the 1960s was laudable but also tended to benefit big importers and exporters."

During the East Timorese civil war in 1975, the two protagonists, the Timorese Democratic Union (Portuguese: União Democrática Timorense (UDT)) and Fretilin, took turns in occupying the port. On the evening of 26/27 August 1975, the Portuguese colonial administration was evacuated from Dili via the port to the offshore island of Atauro.On 7 December 1975, Indonesian troops landed in Dili. After capturing the city, the Indonesians led Chinese residents, members of Fretilin and other prisoners to the port area, shot them, and threw their bodies into the sea. Eyewitnesses later reported that there were dozens of bodies. The victims included suffragette Rosa Bonaparte, her brother Bernardino Bonaparte Soares, Isabel Barreto Lobato (wife of Fretilin-appointed Prime Minister Nicolau dos Reis Lobato) and Roger East, the last remaining foreign reporter in Dili. The total number of people executed on the Dili waterfront is estimated at 150.

=== 1975–1999 ===
During the ensuing Indonesian occupation of East Timor between 1975 and 1999, the port had international status, although access to it was limited by its moderate depth of 16–17 m (52–56 ft). From 1984, it was managed by a state-owned enterprise; with its large capital costs and limited turnover, it was difficult to operate profitably. Korean, Japanese and Singaporean cargo ships docked at the port regularly, except towards the end of the occupation; only one Singaporean ship arrived in 1998, and no international ships at all berthed there in the first half of 1999.

As of mid-1999, the port had a harbor master building, transshipment warehouse, five other warehouses, and an administration building. All were in good condition. The harbour had a beach-landing site with a rock-concrete ramp, and the port a hard stand and a container yard, but no container handling equipment. At least nominally, vessels with a maximum length of 140 m (460 ft) and 7.2 m (24 ft) of draft could dock. However, the port could not handle ships over 100 m (330 ft) in length, 8 m (26 ft) in draft and over 5,000 DWT; its berthing limit was 180 m (590 ft), which was not really adequate to berth even two ships simultaneously, and there were no harbor cranes to offload cargo.

At that time, the port's four public warehouse units had a nominal total area of 3,225 m^{2} (34,710 sq ft), and the remaining warehouse was dedicated for military use. Actual warehouse capacity was only about 2,260 m^{2} (24,300 sq ft), but there was also open storage of 6,272 m^{2} (67,510 sq ft). Other cargo handling facilities and equipment were minimal, and there was a shortage of tugboats. In theory, the port's capacity was 500–700 t (490–690 long tons; 550–770 short tons) per day for bagged goods such as rice and sugar, but in practice it was no more than 500 t per day.

A particular difficulty for cargo operations at the port at that time was that passenger ships had priority, a practice that reduced cargo volumes, added substantially to unloading times, and increased costs. The port was described as one of the worst in the region; goods could often be trucked into the then province of East Timor (Indonesian: Timor Timur) by distributors in Kupang, West Timor, at a lower cost. Regular Perintis passenger services were operated twice each month to Surabaya and Ujung Pandang, and less frequently to Jakarta, Irian Jaya, and Banyuwangi in East Java. Between January and May 1999, 16,738 passengers disembarked in Dili, and 20,705 embarked there.

=== 1999–2015 ===
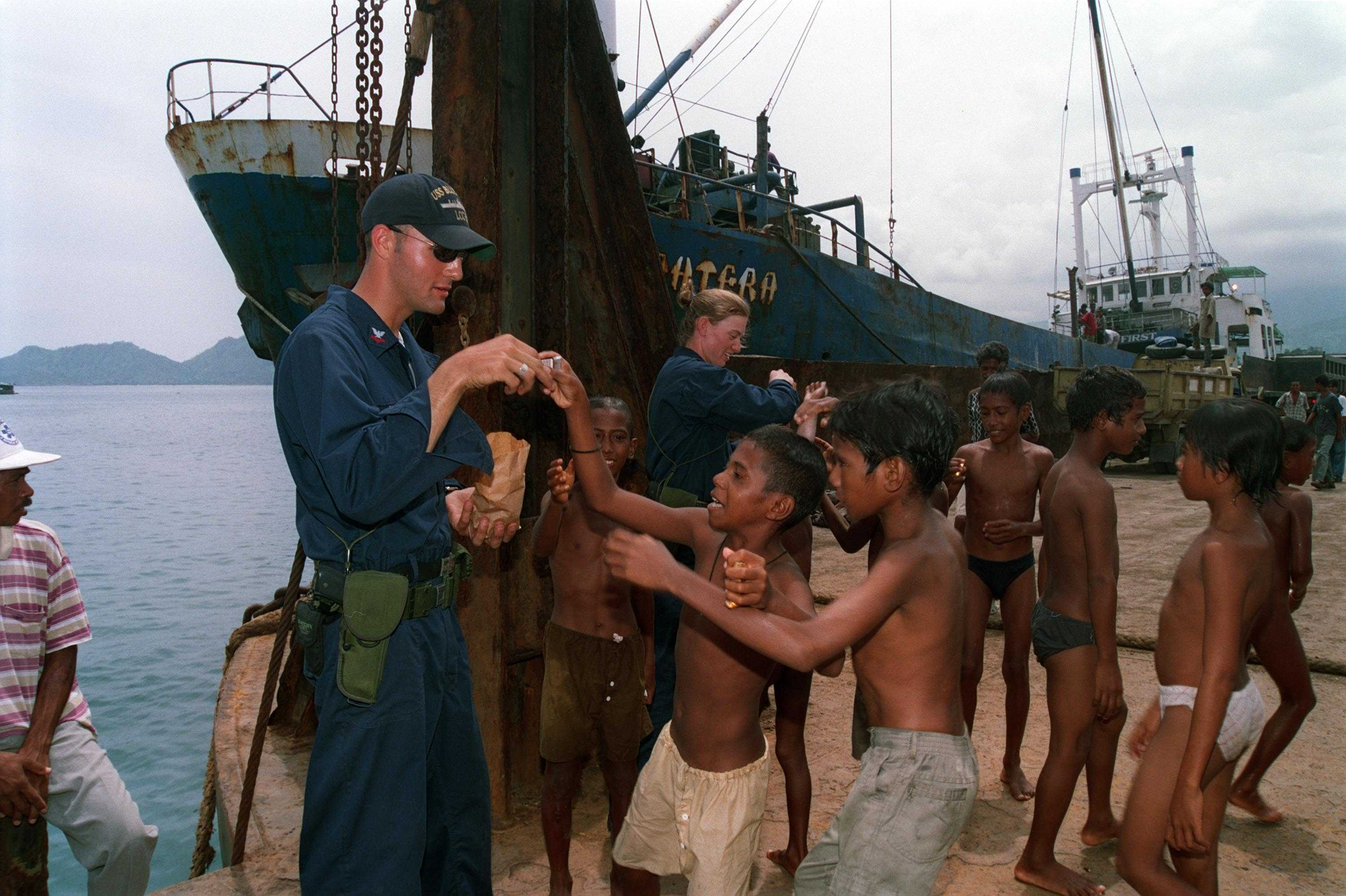
Crew members of USS Blue Ridge hand out candy to children standing on the wharf in February 2000

In the aftermath of the referendum on East Timorese independence held on 30 August 1999, systematic violence by paramilitary groups broke out in Dili and elsewhere in East Timor. Under international pressure, the President of Indonesia, B. J. Habibie, announced on 12 September 1999 that Indonesia would withdraw its soldiers from the territory, and allow an Australian-led international peacekeeping force, INTERFET, to enter.

INTERFET arranged for 91.7 per cent of its cargo by weight and 93.2 per cent by volume, and most of its passengers, to arrive in East Timor by sea, mainly at the port of Dili. Shortly afterwards, the Central Maritime Hotel was towed to Dili and moored close to the port's wharf. A former Russian hospital ship that had been converted into a floating luxury hotel, it remained in Dili for several years. Prior to its arrival, Dili had no landbound hotels or restaurants suitable for international visitors.

In 2000, United Nations Transitional Administration in East Timor (UNTAET), which had taken over the administration of East Timor, asked the Japan International Cooperation Agency (JICA) to conduct a study aimed at developing a plan for the urgent rehabilitation for various items of infrastructure, including the port. JICA presented its report of the study to UNTAET in August 2000.

According to JICA's report, the port had "... buildings, storage facilities, marshalling areas, water system, cargo handling equipment, lighting system ... fender system ..." and a wharf 240 m-long (790 ft) and 30 m-wide (98 ft). Numerous problems with the port's infrastructure were identified. A 48 m-long (157 ft) extension of the wharf had not been completed. The wharf had a deck in fair condition, but its condition underneath the deck was poor. Most of the wharf's 30 rubber fenders were damaged, partly because the port had no tugboat service. The stages and foundation piles of the navigation aids were "extremely poor and dangerous". A leading light in front of the UNTAET headquarters was in extremely poor condition, with most of its members corroded. Both of the revetments protecting the sea sides of the two container stacking yards were in similarly poor condition.

A further problem the JICA report identified was that the port was very busy. In 1997, a total of 556 vessels had called there, and in April/May 2000, the wharf's vessel occupied ratio was 95%. Since February 2000, two vessels had been berthing per day on average, and the report estimated that the cargo handling volume "might increase dramatically" that year by comparison with 1997.

The JICA report recommended an urgent rehabilitation plan for the port, to be completed by June 2003. The plan included restoration of navigation aids, fenders and the east container stacking yard, and rehabilitation of the west container stacking yard. Additionally, a rubber wheel loader was recommended to be installed once a final structure for the port management system had been established.

During 2008, the port was visited by 260 ships, and handled 24,570 TEU of containers and 131,391 t (129,316 long tons; 144,834 short tons) of cargo. As of 2011, a total of 200,000 t (200,000 long tons; 220,000 short tons) of goods was being processed annually at the port, a throughput that had increased by 20% each year for the previous six years. Of the goods processed, 80% were imports.

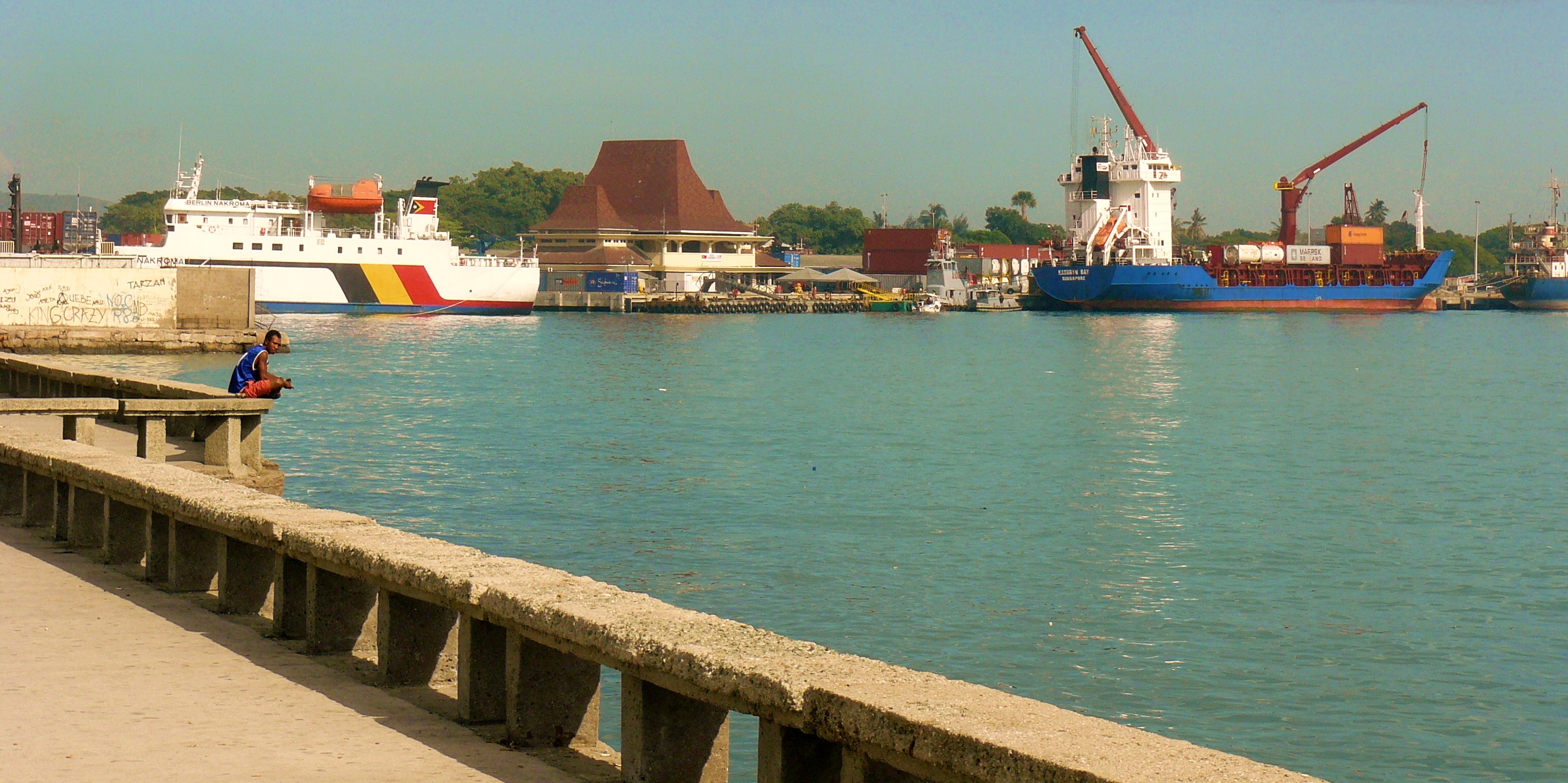
The port in 2010

As of the 2010s, the Port of Dili was the main and only international port of entry to Timor-Leste. By the middle of that decade, the port, although improved by Japanese grant aid, had a nearly saturated capacity, and its safety measures were not satisfactory. It was struggling to cope with its volume of cargo and could not be expanded due to the physical constraints of its location. The depth alongside the wharf was such that only small container ships could berth alongside, and the berths and approach channel required frequent dredging. Larger ships were forced to unload onto lighters, causing delays and added costs. Further, the apron and container stacking areas were in poor condition due to lack of maintenance.

Shipments to and from the port were restricted to containerised and conventional cargos. The port had no facilities to handle bulk cargos, and any fuel or liquids coming into it had to be shipped in ISO containers. Two privately owned fuel jetties close to Dili were used for bulk fuel shipments. Theoretically, the port had the capacity to import and export 120,000 TEU/Year, but the container yard was not able to function as efficiently as average container ports. The records taken in 2014 had 51,822 TEU passing in or out.

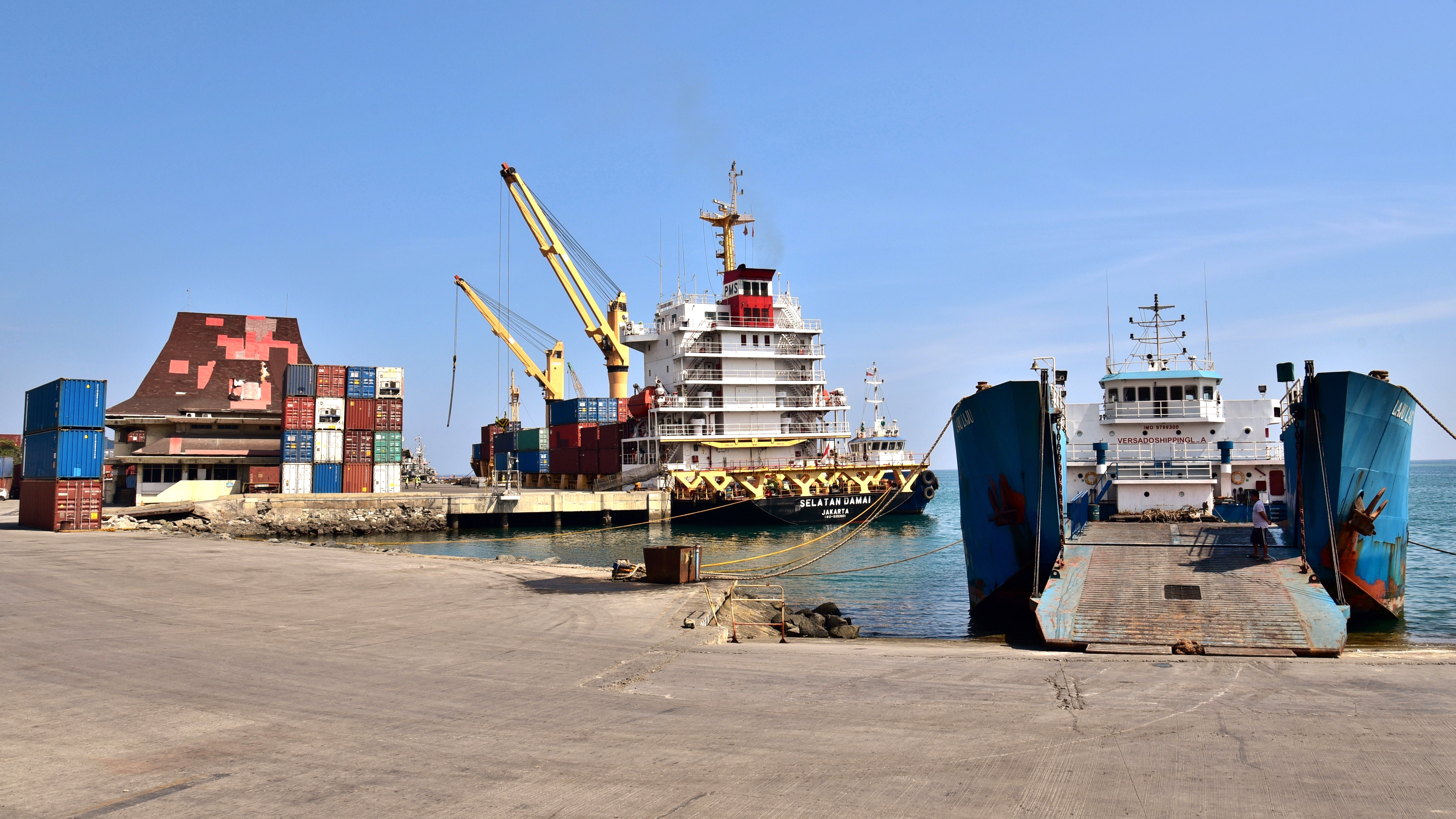
(L–R) Selatan Damai and Laju Laju moored at the port in 2018

The port also experienced delays of up to 10 days for commercial container ships. Only one container gantry was available, with a capacity of 18 t (18 long tons; 20 short tons); there was no dockside crane. The main onshore method for loading and unloading cargo was mobile cranes operated by private companies.

Storage facilities within the port were very limited. However, the port warehouses, located within a secure area, were permanent structures with good drainage and corrugated iron roofing. On the port's hard standing, a maximum of only 1,000 containers could be stored. Some of the stevedoring companies operating in the port had storage compounds outside the port. As of January 2014, land was being levelled in Tasitolu, 9 km (5.6 mi) to the west of the port, to create additional storage.

To solve the problems of congestion, the government planned, as of 2014, to:

- Improve the management of cargo ships by utilizing the quayside, as loading and unloading cargo ships takes more time than passenger vessels.
- Increase the space of the shipping-container yard to allow for an increase of storage space for containers.
- Implement night-time operation for both the general cargo and container areas.
- Coordinate general cargo and passenger loading and unloading.
- Establish the west end as the ferry and passenger area, and the east side to general cargo and container operations.
- Improve security by constructing fencing, CCTV camera systems, security lighting, clocking systems and passenger scanners.

=== 2016–2022 ===
In June 2016, the government signed an agreement with the Bolloré Group to build a new container port at Tibar Bay, around 12 km (7.5 mi) from Dili.

The 30-year Tibar Bay Port concession contract was the first public-private partnership (PPP) ever undertaken in Timor-Leste. At a value of US$490 million, it was also the country's largest ever private investment. The greenfield project was intended to replace the existing port of Dili with a modern container port that would be able to handle up to 350,000 TEU annually. The new port was planned to consist of a 630 m (2,070 ft) wharf with a 15 m (49 ft) draft, and a 29 ha (72 acres) container yard.

Subsequently, Bolloré Group contracted with China Harbour Engineering Company to construct the new port.

Construction was declared to be underway in June 2017 and August 2018, and was originally scheduled to be completed by the end of 2020. However, issues with funding and subcontracting delayed progress, and the official ceremony launching the project was not held until 15 July 2019.

At the same time, attention was directed to what might be done with the Port of Dili after the new port opened. In August 2019, the United States Agency for International Development (USAID) published a Priority Action Plans Report on the tourism sector in Timor-Leste, in which it set out an action plan for the redevelopment and commercialisation of the Dili port site. The action plan proposed the transformation of the site into an integrated, commercial, entertainment and arts facility "for tourists and residents alike".

In mid-2021, the Timor-Leste Council of Ministers approved "a plan to develop an international-standard marina complex" on the Port of Dili site. The government, the port authority and technical experts had been working with USAID's Tourism For All project for the previous two years to put together a proposal for a PPP to transform the port into a "tourism hub". According to the government's announcement of the plan:

"The development will include the creation of a variety of tourism-related waterfront facilities for visiting cruise ships and yachts, whale-watching and dive boats, as well as serving as a terminal for local ferry services. The plan includes a dedicated area for passenger processing, immigration and customs, accessed by a pedestrian bridge, with ample parking and loading facilities. A marina will provide moorings for small and medium-sized vessels and allow for safe and easy embarkation of passengers and loading luggage, supplies and equipment."

On 30 September 2022, Tibar Bay Port came into operation, and the facilities at the Port of Dili were closed to container ships. Since then, the facilities have been open only to domestic passenger ships and cruise ships carrying international tourists.

=== 2023–present ===
At a ceremony held on 28 March 2023, the Chargé d'Affaires of the U.S. Embassy in Timor-Leste, Tom Daley, handed over to the government of Timor-Leste the "Feasibility Study of the Dili Port Redevelopment Project". The Feasibility Study had been carried out by the USAID Tourism For All Project, and recommended a PPP model for the project. The Timor-Leste government announcement about the ceremony stated:

"The Dili Port Redevelopment Project will combine transportation and tourism business components. In terms of transportation, the port will provide facilities for cruise ships, private yachts, and passenger boats that intend to travel to Ataúro Island for activities such as snorkeling, whale watching, dolphin watching, and fishing. As for the tourism business aspect, the project will offer facilities for hotels, restaurants, cafes, craft shops, conference rooms/community events, exhibition facilities, cultural and musical activities, spaces for tourism operators, and for small businesses in the tourism sector."

Financing for the project was estimated at US$150 million under the PPP model.

== Operations ==
The entity responsible for the development, operations, and maintenance of the port is the Port Authority of Timor-Leste (APORTIL), an agency of the Ministry of Public Works.

Entrance to the port for vessels is restricted to 7:30 a.m. to 5:30 p.m. The wharves and port gates are operational 24 hours a day.

== Facilities ==
The Port of Dili is relatively small. Its main wharf is 280 m (920 ft) long and has a maximum capacity of three commercial vessels, as it is nominally divided into three berths. There are two roll-on/roll-off ramps – one at the east end of the wharf and the other at the west end – and a yacht anchorage on the port side of the wharf. Permanent moorings are provided for visiting yachts.

== Concerns ==
Concerns have been raised by the government about the port's capacity and maintenance. As of 2014, maintenance, management manuals, and routine port checks were nonexistent, and staff size, experience and budget were not sufficient, and accident records were not available. The government pushed the port to establish a record of incidents.

Government officials, especially former prime minister Dr. Mari Alkatiri, expressed concern about how sea level rise (SLR) will affect the port. Another concern was that SLR causes flooding to a great portion of the island. Studies were attempting to establish effects on the port, but information and data are lacking.

== See also ==
- Transport in Timor-Leste
- Tibar Bay Port
