= Transport in Timor-Leste =

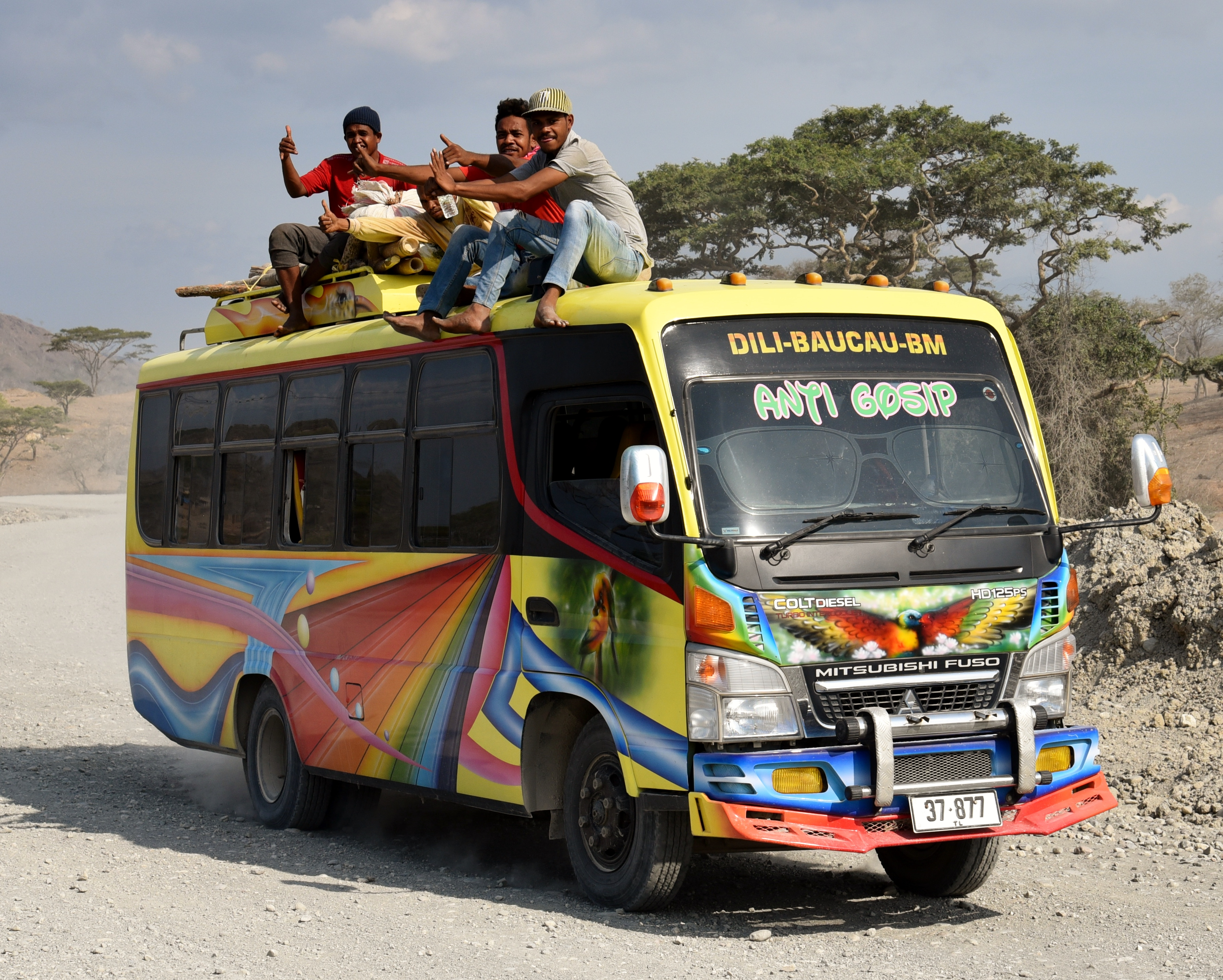
A Baucau–Dili autocarro on national road A01, 2018

Transport in Timor-Leste consists of roads, buses and minibuses, ferries, and airplanes, with roads being the primary mode of transport. Timor-Leste's transportation infrastructure is underdeveloped, with much of the road network in poor condition, though the government has invested significantly in upgrades since independence.

There are no railways in the country. The country has six airports, one of which has commercial and international flights.

== Road transport ==
=== History ===
During the Portuguese colonial period, which lasted from 1702 to 1975, little was invested in development or even upkeep of existing infrastructure. As late as the years following World War II, there were still no paved roads in the colony, even in the capital, Dili. Outside of the capital, roads and bridges were in poor condition or nonexistent, with many locations accessible only by traditional paths used by indigenous inhabitants.

Following the 1975 Indonesian invasion and subsequent occupation of the country, which lasted until 1999, substantial infrastructure development occurred, including a significant expansion of the road network. According to official figures, by 1995, 2,500 km (1,600 mi) of roads were constructed in East Timor, some 700 km (430 mi) of which were asphalted. The number of registered vehicles likewise rose from 118 in 1978 to 4,969 in 1996.

=== Road network ===
Timor-Leste has a road network of 6,041 km (3,754 mi), of which about 2,600 km (1,600 mi) of roads are paved, and about 3,440 km (2,140 mi) are unpaved.

The road network is made up of national roads linking municipal capitals (~1,500 km (930 mi)), municipal roads linking municipal capitals to towns and villages (~870 km (540 mi)), urban roads within urban areas (~717 km (446 mi)) and rural roads within rural areas (~3,112 km (1,934 mi)).

As of 2003, Timor-Leste's main arterial roads were located along the north coast, and there were good sealed roads in and around urban centres. The central mountain ridge is rugged with a maximum elevation of 3,000 m (9,800 ft) AMSL. In 2003, it could be crossed by road in several places, but the mountain roads were poorly maintained unsealed one-two lane tracks. Roads on the south coast were mostly unsealed and in poor condition.

In a 2015 survey reported by the World Bank, 57% of the rural roads were rated either bad or poor.

While under Portuguese rule, East Timor's road system, like the road network in all Portuguese colonies, adhered to right-hand traffic. After the Indonesian takeover in 1975, the roads were made to switch to left-hand traffic (like virtually all of present-day Indonesia). Upon independence in 2002 the left-hand traffic rule was retained.

==== National roads ====
Timor-Leste has 20 arterial roads, designated as A-class roads (national roads), as follows:

No	From	To	Length (km)	Length (mi)
A01	Dili	Com, Lautém	203.9	126.7
A02^{<1}	Dili	Suai	176.4	109.6
A03	Dili	Mota Ain	118.2	73.4
A03'	Batugade	Maliana	42.4	26.3
A04	Tibar	Ermera	46.8	29.1
A05	Aitotu	Betano	55.6	34.5
A06	Baucau	Viqueque	64.9	40.3
A07	Viqueque	Natarbora	46.0	28.6
A08	Lautém	Viqueque	121.7	75.6
A09	Manatuto	Natarbora	79.5	49.4
A10	Ermera	Hauba	66.9	41.6
A11	Maliana	Ermera	64.7	40.2
A12	Zumalai	Maliana	52.5	32.6
A13	Cassa	Aiassa	25.1	15.6
A14	Betano	Natarbora	47.7	29.6
A15	Suai	Uemassa	27.5	17.1
A16	Uele'o	Tilomar	33.4	20.8
A17	Pante Macassar	Oesilo	25.3	15.7
A18	Pante Macassar	Citrana	44.9	27.9
A19	Pante Macassar	Sacato	14.8	9.2
Total			1,358.2	843.9

In October 2016, the East Timorese government symbolically launched a rehabilitation project for the Dili–Manatuto–Baucau national road. Construction was to be undertaken in two sections, Dili–Manatuto, and Manatuto–Baucau, in each case by a Chinese construction company. The project was financed by the General State Budget, and also from a loan fund from the Japanese government, through the Japan International Cooperation Agency (JICA). It was due to be completed in mid-2019, and the completed road was officially inaugurated on 26 August 2022.

According to a road network connectivity quality assessment published in September 2019, the national road network already satisfactorily connected all national activity centres for all types of vehicles in circulation. However, some of the road segments needed to be improved, in terms of road width, drainage, geometric design and traffic facilities.

=== Bridges ===
As of 2003, Timor-Leste had 450 road bridges. They were well constructed, but a few important bridges in the south of the country were either not in service or uncompleted. Where a bridge was not in service, the relevant stream was shallow and for most of the year could be forded.

==== Bridges in Dili ====
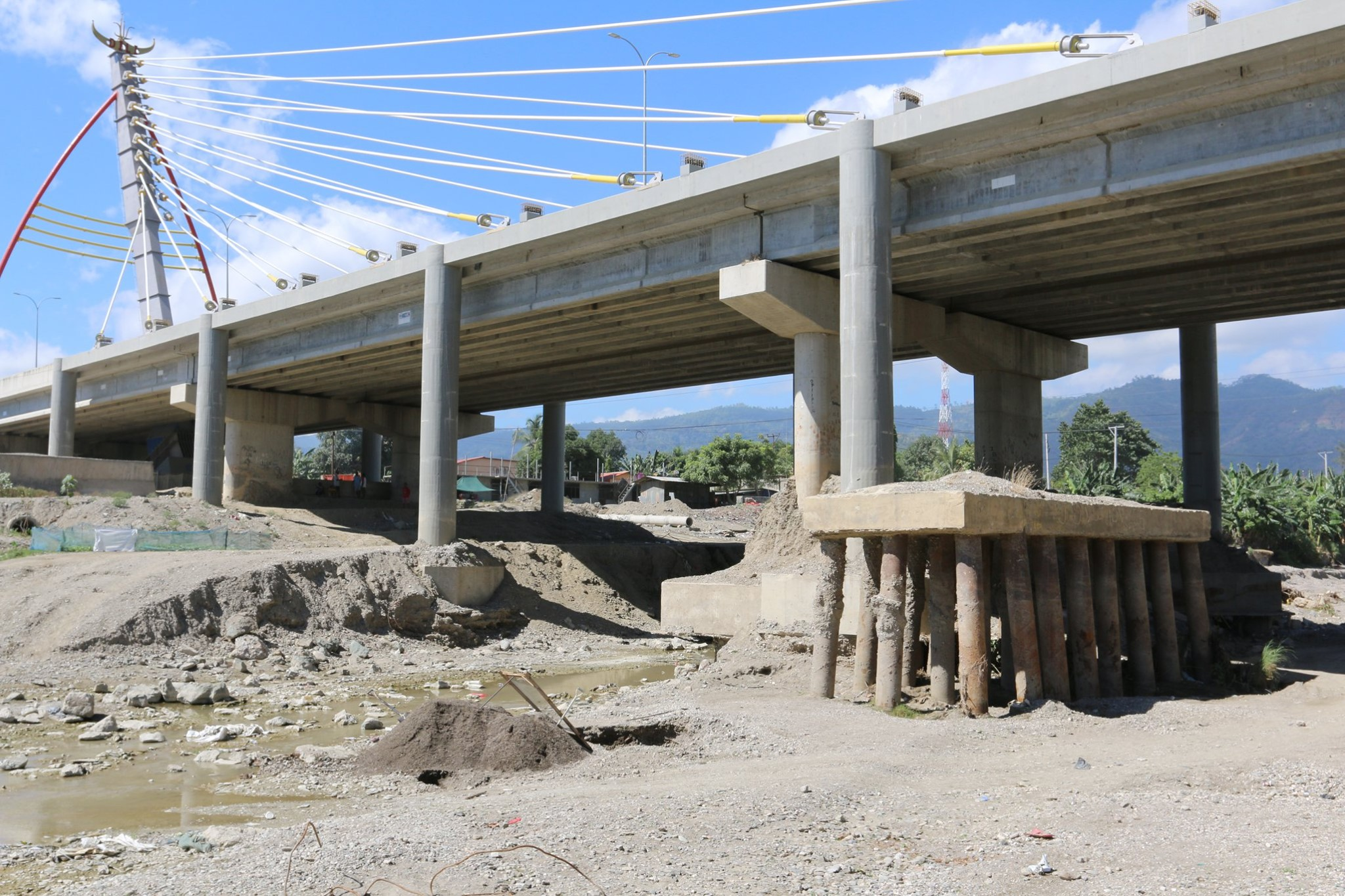
The CPLP Bridge in Dili during the dry season in 2019

Two road bridges over the Comoro River link central Dili with the west side of the city, including the Presidente Nicolau Lobato International Airport and the Tibar Bay port, which as at early 2022 was due to start operations later that year. The more important of these two bridges is the CPLP Bridge; its alternative, approximately 800 m (2,600 ft) to its south, is the Hinode Bridge.

At the north eastern corner of central Dili, the B. J. Habibie Bridge spans the Claran River, and connects central Dili with the eastern waterfront of the Bay of Dili.

==== Noefefan Bridge ====
This bridge, also known as the Tono Bridge, was inaugurated in 2017 as part of the ZEESM TL project in Oecusse.

=== Public Transport ===
==== Cross-border Bus ====
The Indonesia national bus company DAMRI operate bus express route between Kupang and Dili, the first cross-border bus route in Timor-Leste.

== Rail transport ==
Timor-Leste has no railways. However, a master plan for a 500 km (310 mi) long electrified double-track railway was proposed in 2012, with a central line from Bobonaro to Lospalos, a western corridor from Dili to Betano and an eastern corridor from Baucau to Uatolari.

== Water transport ==
=== Ports and harbors ===
- Port of Dili – for passenger ships and cruise ships carrying international passengers
- Tibar Bay Port – for import and export goods; opened on 30 September 2022

=== Merchant marine ===
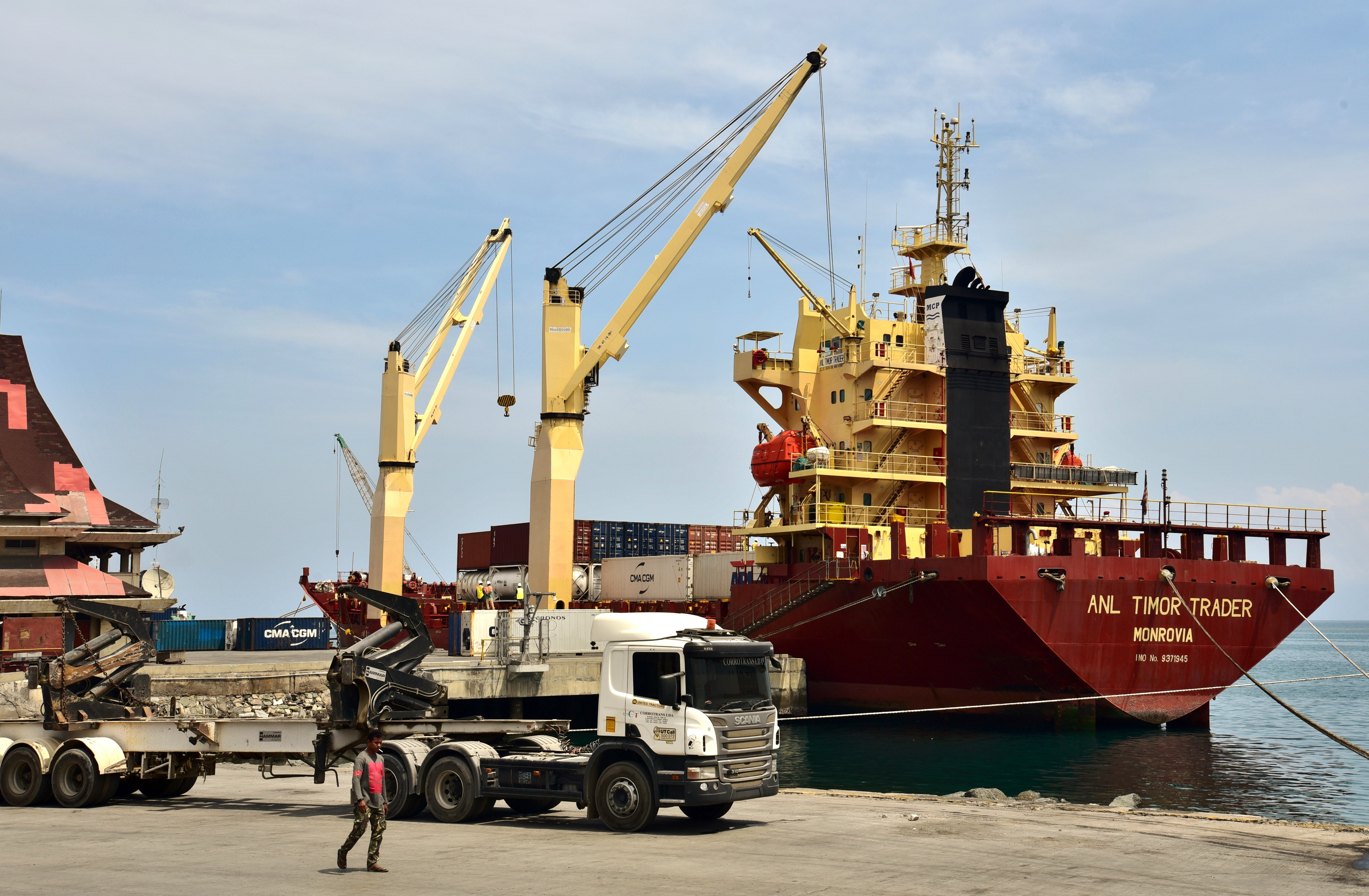
Liberian flagged general cargo ship ANL Timor Trader being unloaded at the Port of Dili, 2018

Total

- 1

Ships by type

- passenger/cargo 1 (2010)

Routes

In July 2022, the President of Indonesia, Joko Widodo, urged the government of Timor-Leste to open a shipping route between Kupang, Dili, and Darwin, to boost sea lane connectivity.

== Air transport ==
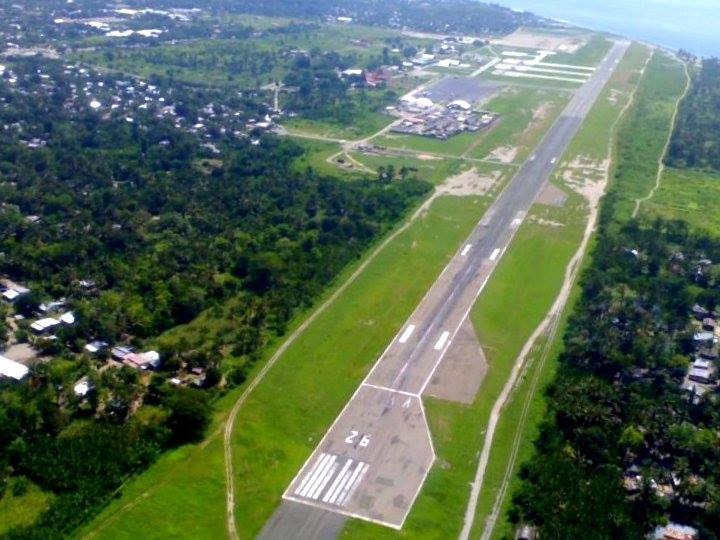
Presidente Nicolau Lobato International Airport in Dili

As of 2019, Timor-Leste had eight airports. The three major ones were Presidente Nicolau Lobato International Airport in Dili, Cakung or Baucau Airport in Baucau, and Suai Airport in Suai. Only the first two of these were designed as international airports.

The airport at Dili is the main international airport. As of 2022, commercial scheduled service was also provided at Suai Airport, and Oecusse Airport in Pante Macassar. Local airports included Viqueque Airport in Viqueque.

No airport in Timor-Leste is officially available for night operations, but the government permits such operations in emergencies.

=== Heliports ===
8 (2012)
