= Tibar Bay Port =

Container seaport in Dili, Timor-Leste

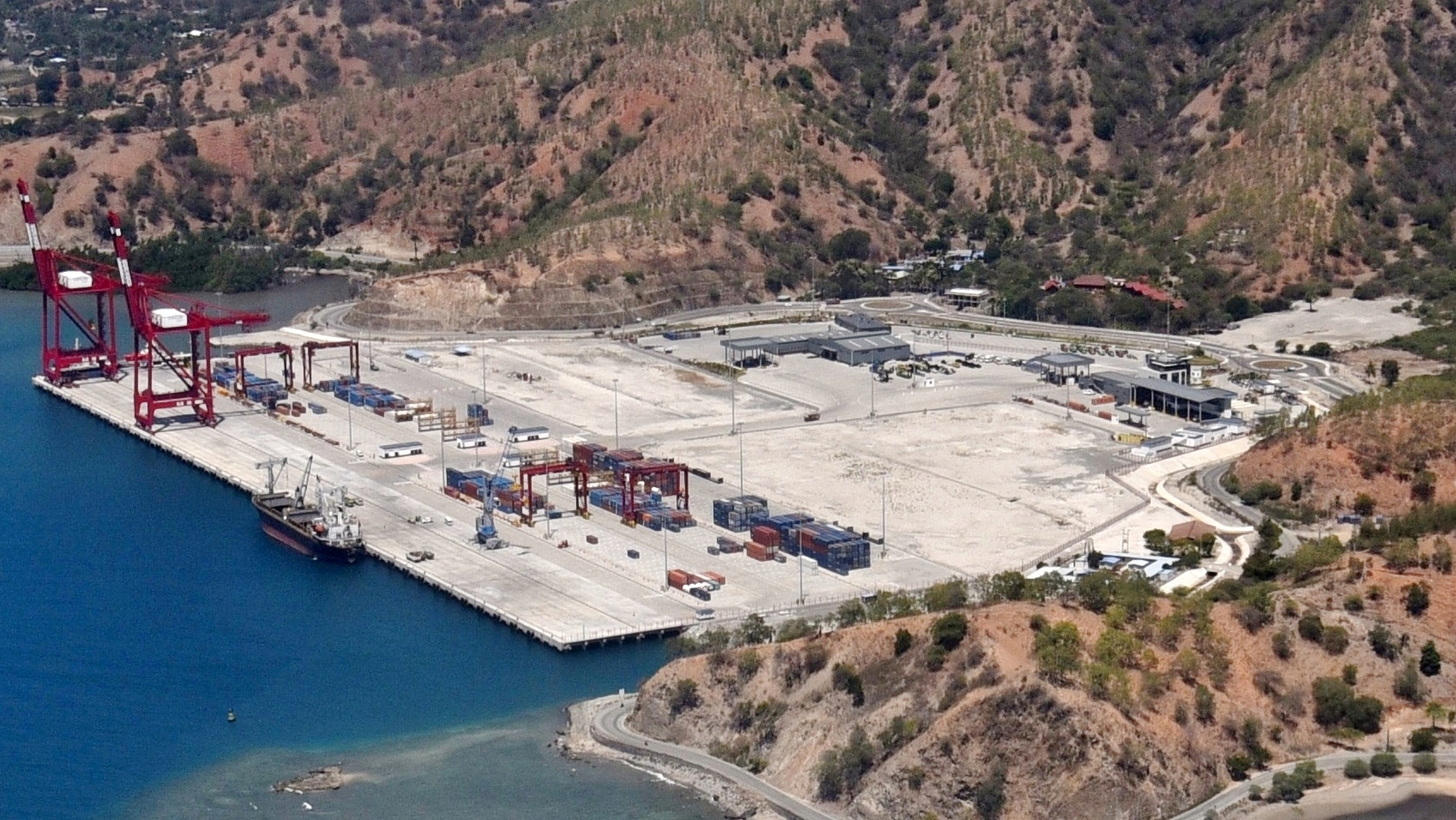
- Aerial view of the port in August 2023
- Interactive map of Tibar Bay Port
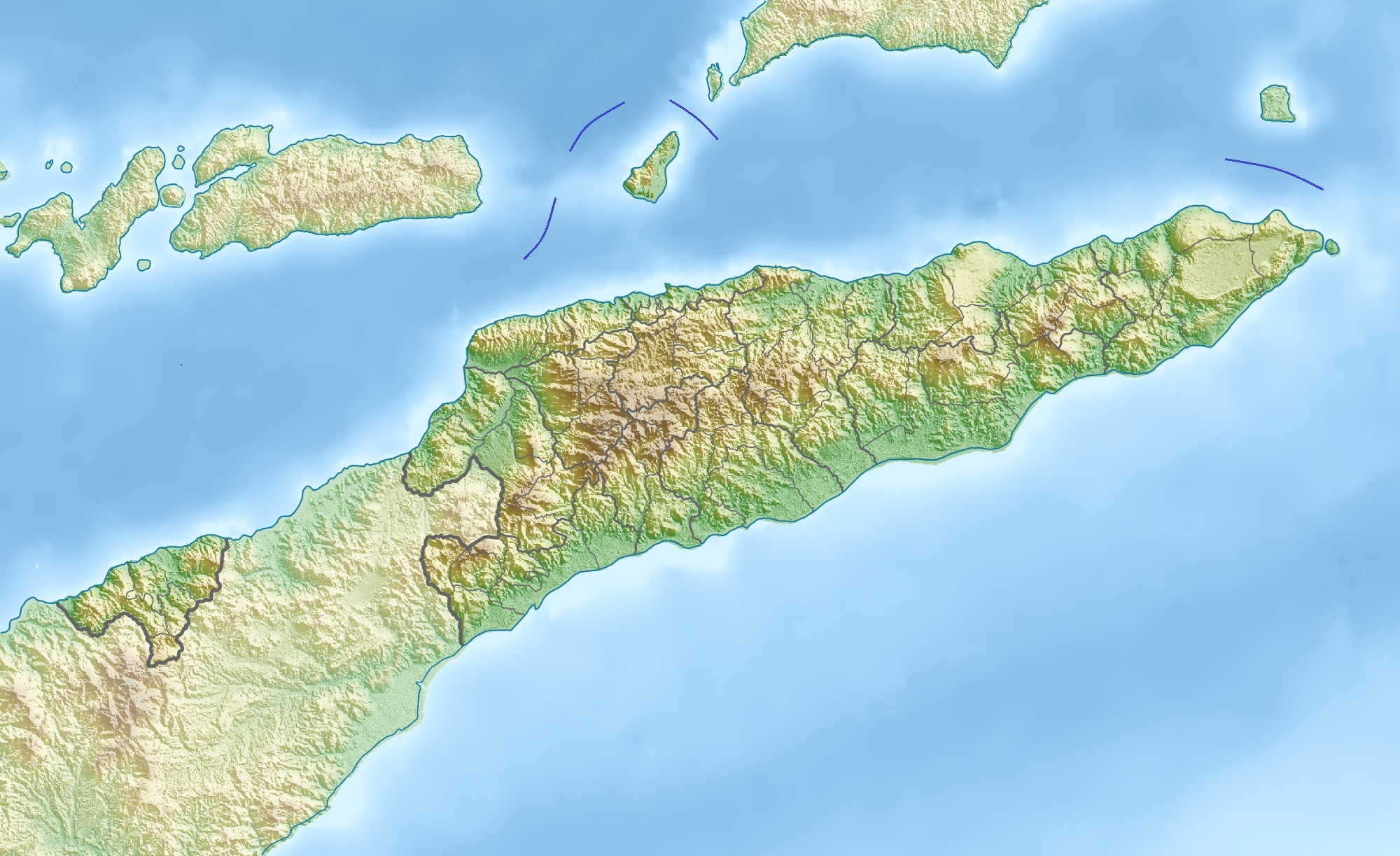
- Location of port in Timor-Leste
- Native name: Porto da Baía de Tibar (Portuguese); Portu Baía Tibar (Tetum)

Location
- Country: Timor-Leste
- Location: Tibar Bay
- Coordinates: 8°34′22″S 125°28′28″E

Details
- Opened: 30 September 2022; (operations commenced); 30 November 2022; (official inauguration)
- Operated by: Timor Port; (formerly Africa Global Logistics)
- Owned by: Africa Global Logistics
- Type of Harbor: Coastal natural
- No. of wharfs: One, 630 m (2,070 ft) long
- Draft depth: 15 m (49 ft)
- Chairman: Rafael Mendes Ribeiro

Statistics
- Net income: US$500 billion
- Website; Africa Global Logistics

Tibar Bay Port (Portuguese: Porto da Baía de Tíbar, Tetum: Portu Baía Tibar), also known as Timor Port, the trading name of its operator, a public–private partnership, is a container seaport at Tibar Bay, near Dili, the capital city of Timor-Leste. The largest item of infrastructure in Timor-Leste, and in the country's history, it commenced operations on 30 September 2022.

== Geography ==
The port is located on the western side of Tibar Bay, approximately 12 km (7.5 mi) west of Dili.

== History ==
In June 2016, the government of Timor-Leste signed an agreement with the Bolloré Group to build and operate a new container port at Tibar Bay. The 30-year concession contract was the first public–private partnership ever undertaken in Timor-Leste. At a value of US$490 million (comprising $130m public and $360m private funds), it also amounted to the country's largest ever private investment.

The greenfield project was intended to replace the existing, capacity-strained and congestion-ridden container handling facilities at the Port of Dili. The new port was planned to be a modern container port able to handle up to 350,000 TEU annually.

Subsequently, Bolloré Group contracted with China Harbour Engineering Company to construct the new port. Amongst the works required to complete the construction project were 3.5 million m^{3} (120 million cu ft) of dredging, reclamation of 27 ha (67 acres) of land, and establishment of related housing, storage yards and other supporting facilities. As of 2022, Tibar Bay and the Port of Dili were the only places in Timor-Leste where dredging at significant scale had ever been carried out.

The construction work was declared to be underway in June 2017 and August 2018, and was originally scheduled to be completed by the end of 2020. However, issues with funding and subcontracting delayed progress. The official ceremony launching the project was not held until 15 July 2019, and construction actually began the following month.

In February 2021, the port's Executive Director informed the government that the construction project had reached 42% completion at the end of December 2020, and had proceeded to construction of pillars, wharf compaction, and yard work. But there had also been delays due to the COVID-19 pandemic, and final completion was now predicted to be reached in April 2022.

In particular, the pandemic had caused the majority of foreign workers, mainly from China, to return to their home countries. The project manager therefore asked the government to authorize a special flight from Guangzhou in China directly to Dili, to carry 186 workers, so that the works can be completed according to the revised plan. The government agreed to facilitate such a flight.

As of the end of 2021, the port works were 72% complete, and construction was expected to be finished in May 2022, but then there were further delays. Meanwhile, in October 2021, a local non-governmental organisation (NGO), La'o Hamutuk, claimed that far fewer Timorese workers had been employed in the construction project than had been promised.

The port's ship-to-shore (STS) gantries and rubber-tyred gantries (RTGs) were unloaded in mid-May 2022, in the presence of the Prime Minister, Taur Matan Ruak, and several members of his government. By then, the government was saying, based on the then current plans, that the port would be ready to become operational in September or October 2022.

The first container unloading tests were conducted in mid-September 2022, using two vessels belonging to Mariana Line, a subsidiary of Pacific International Lines (PIL). A total of 500 containers were unloaded in less than 24 hours for each vessel, and 22 full containers were loaded for export.

On 21 September 2022, the government announced that the port would come into operation on 30 September 2022. Operations commenced with the arrival of the vessels Selatan Damai and Meratus Pematangsiantar. On 30 November 2022, President José Ramos-Horta and Prime Minister Taur Matan Ruak presided over the port's official inauguration ceremony.

Between the commencement of its operations and its official inauguration, the port collected US$195,000 in various fees.

Construction of the port

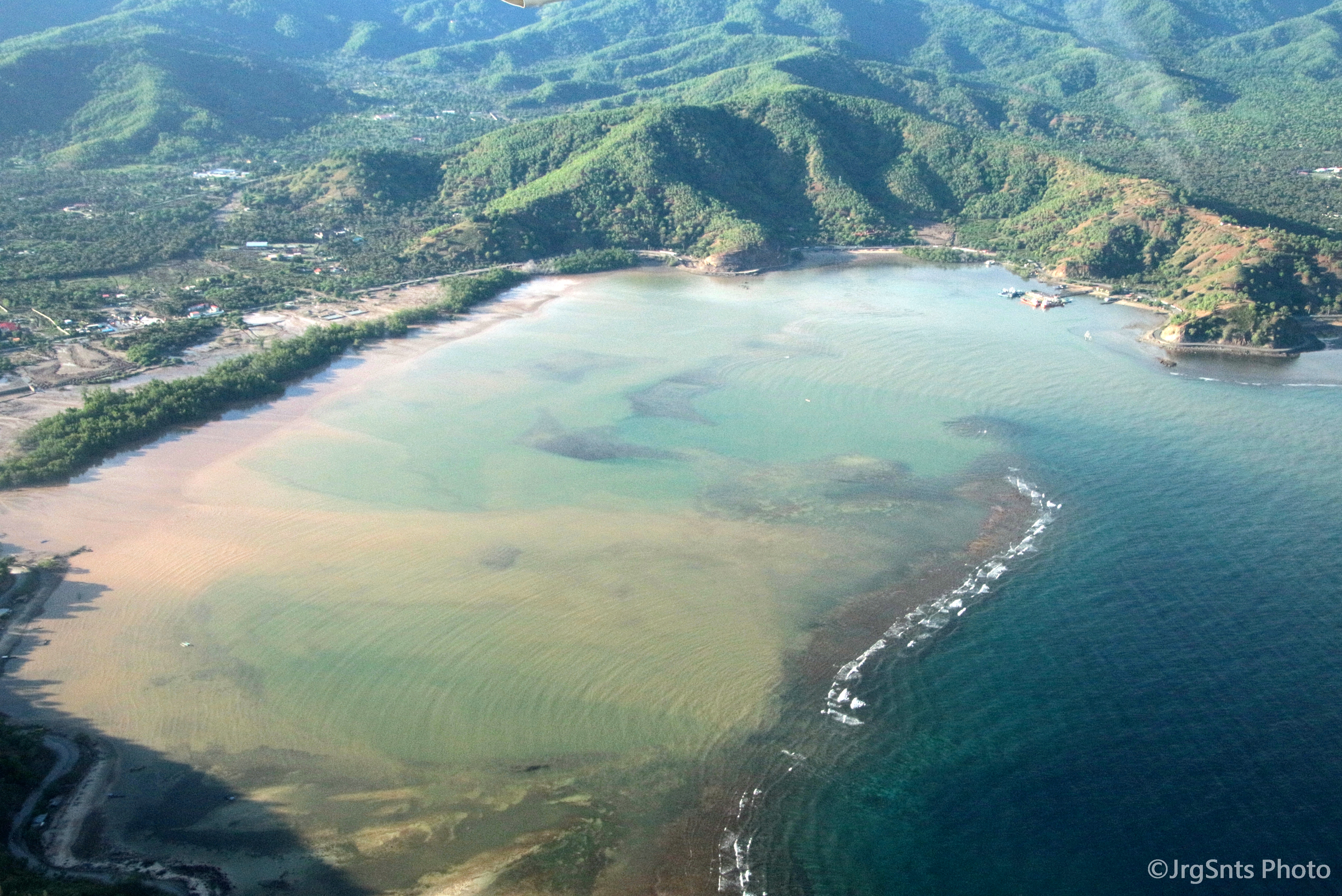
2016

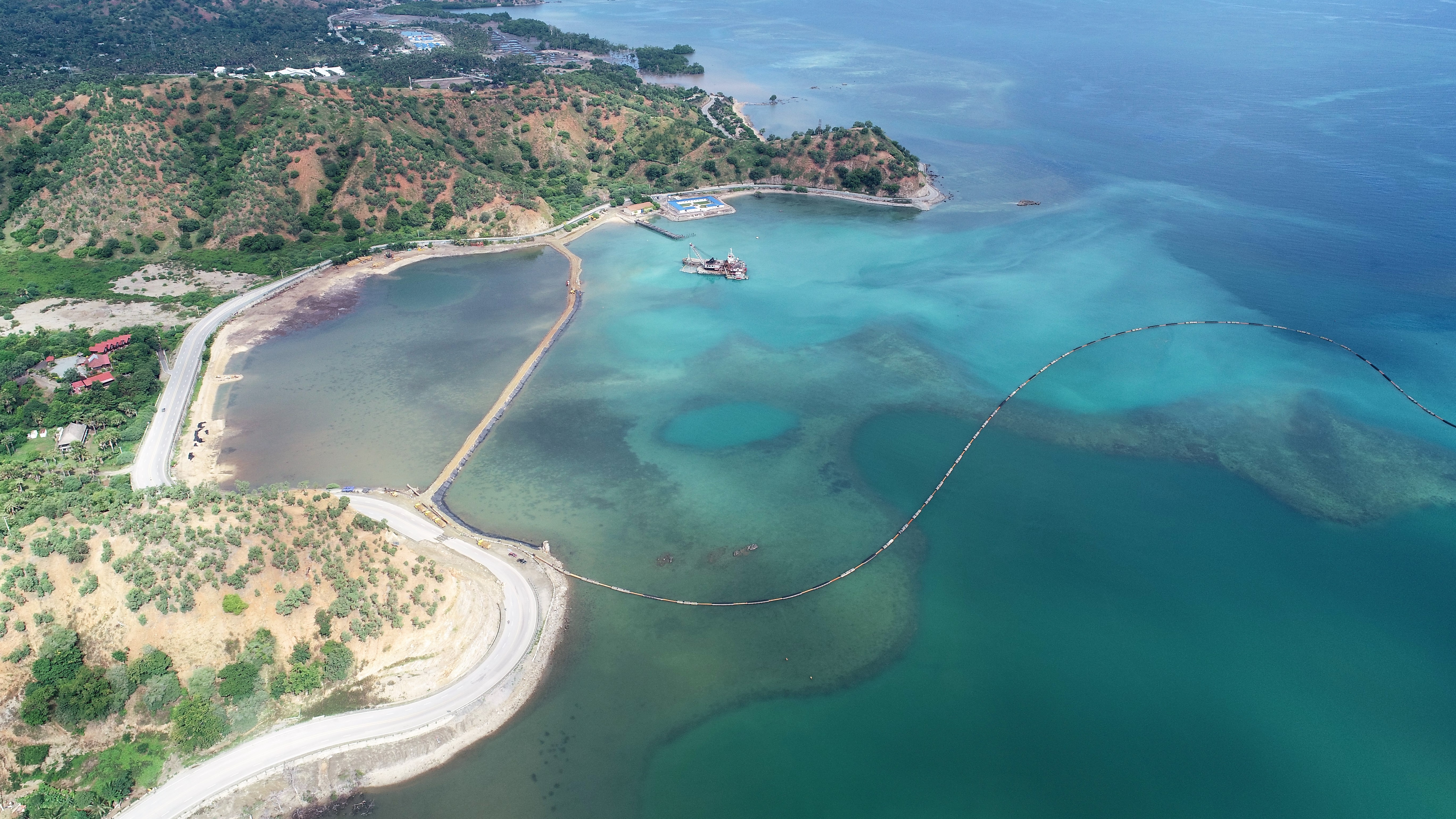
2019

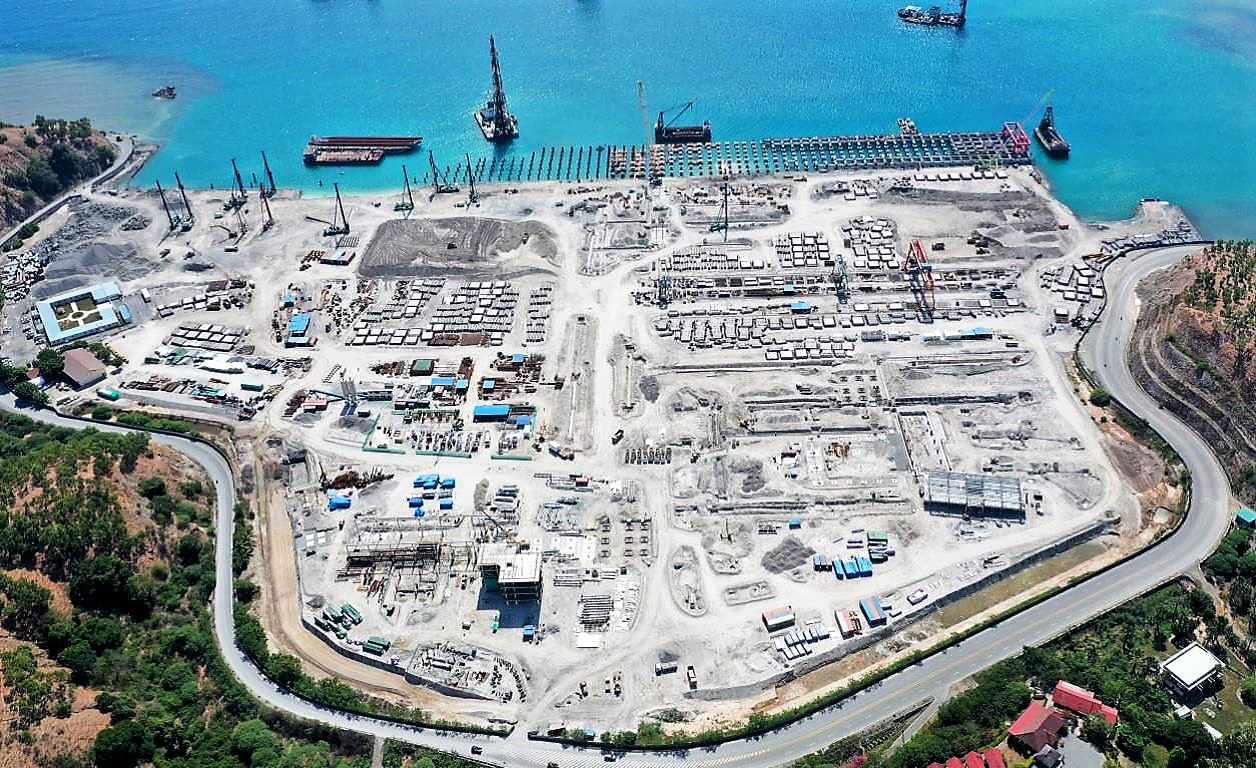
2021

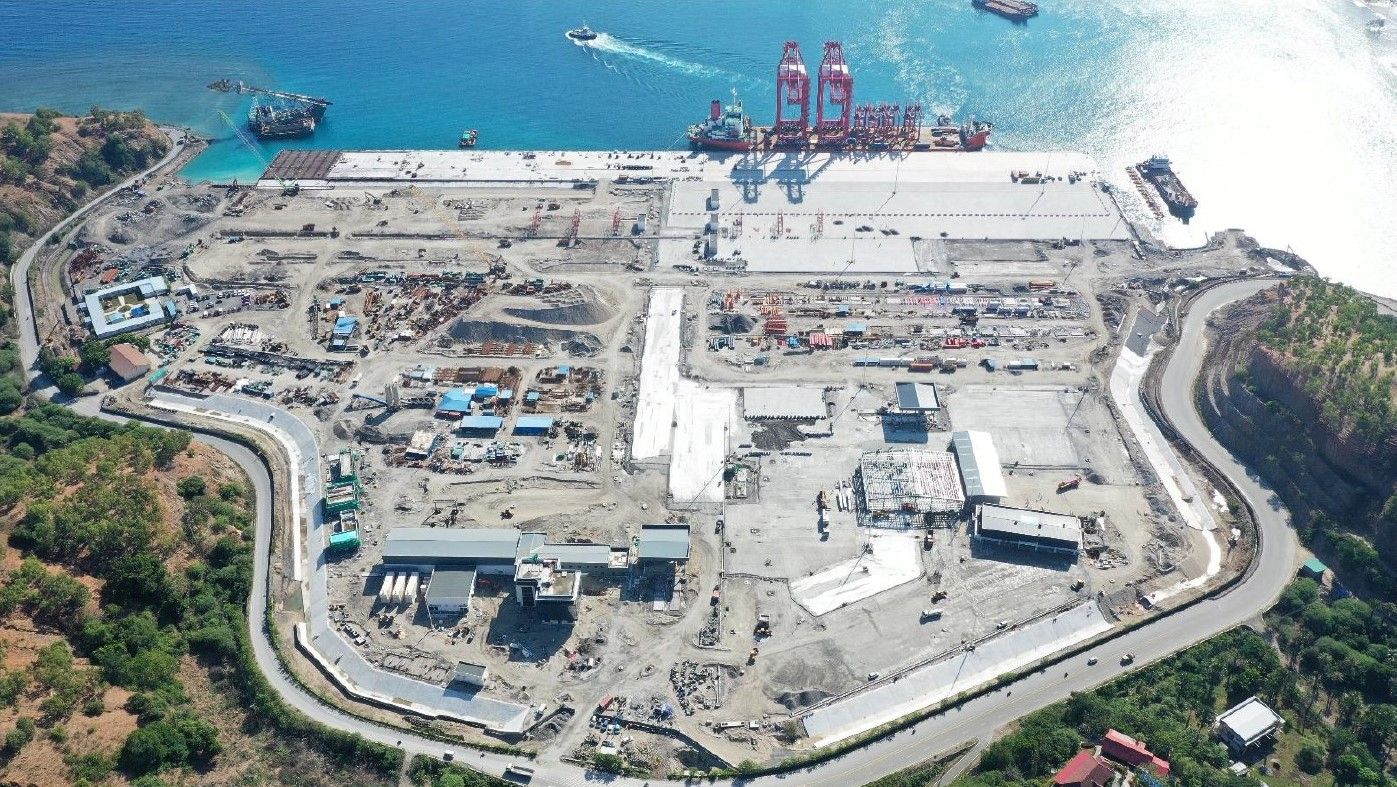
2022

With effect from December 2022, Bolloré Group sold Bolloré Africa Logistics, the owner and operator of the port, to the MSC Group of Switzerland, and in March 2023 MSC Group announced that the name of the company had been changed to Africa Global Logistics.

In a September 2023 update to La'o Hamutuk's earlier claim about the port, the NGO claimed, further, that shippers had not been using the port as expected, as it had turned out to be cheaper to import goods into West Timor, Indonesia, and then send them to Dili by truck.

== Description ==
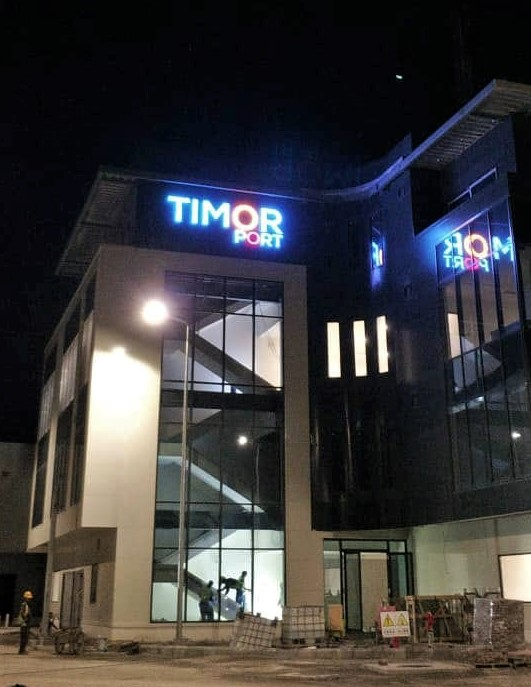
The port's administration building in September 2022

Tibar Bay Port, also known as Timor Port, the trading name of the public–private partnership that operates it, is the largest item of infrastructure in Timor-Leste, and in the country's history. It consists of a 630 m (2,070 ft) wharf with a 15 m (49 ft) draft, and a 29 ha (72 acres) container yard.

The port can receive larger ships than the Port of Dili, and thus has better operating economics. Its wharf includes a 7,000-TEU berth and a 3,500-TEU berth. When fully operational, it will be Timor-Leste's only logistics centre for maritime cargo transport and trade.

As such, the port represents a significant change in maritime cargo transport to and from Timor-Leste. Previously, such transport was strongly affected by the limited size of the Port of Dili, as that port could only receive ships equipped with cranes, and was plagued by delays in the processing of containers, and by 'extra costs', often 'hidden'. By contrast, Tibar Bay Port has an annual cargo throughput capacity of up to one million containers, and a storage capacity of 20,000 containers.

Shortly before the port went into operation, the president of its board of directors, Laurent Palayer, claimed to Lusa News Agency that the near-monopoly container operator in the country, Meratus Line [translation]:

"... have been working in a niche market, without competition, with high profit margins. And now, instead of adjusting prices, they just want to increase. In practice, they will save money: less waiting time, less time in port and the ability to bring in larger ships,"

Mobile equipment at Tibar Bay Port includes two ship-to-shore (STS) gantries, four rubber-tyred gantries (RTGs), 10 terminal tractors and 16 trailers. At 80 m (260 ft) high, the STS gantries are Timor-Leste's tallest structures, and, as the port's most visible element, dominate its landscape. The port also has 11.6 ha (29 acres) of offices and workshops, and X-ray scanners have been approved for purchase.

By January 2023, the port had 38 permanent staff and 32 permanent workers from the local area, and the port's subcontractors had engaged 76 workers. It is expected the total number of staff will reach 200. The port's Executive Director is Rafael Ribeira.

== See also ==
- Transport in Timor-Leste
- Port of Dili
