= Dom Aleixo Administrative Post =

Administrative post in Dili Municipality, East Timor

Dom Aleixo
- Administrative Post
- Posto Administrativo de Dom Aleixo (Portuguese); Postu Administrativu Dom Aleixo (Tetum)
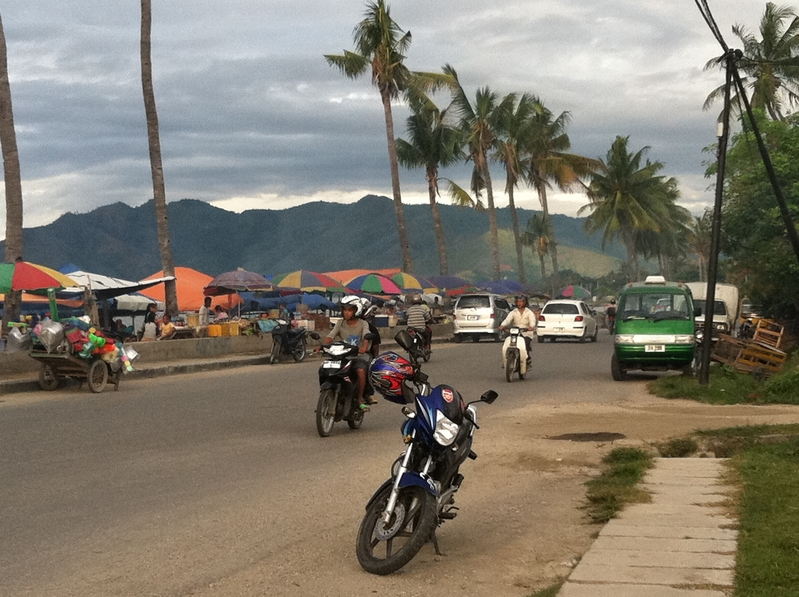
- Beach Road, Fatuhada, Dom Aleixo

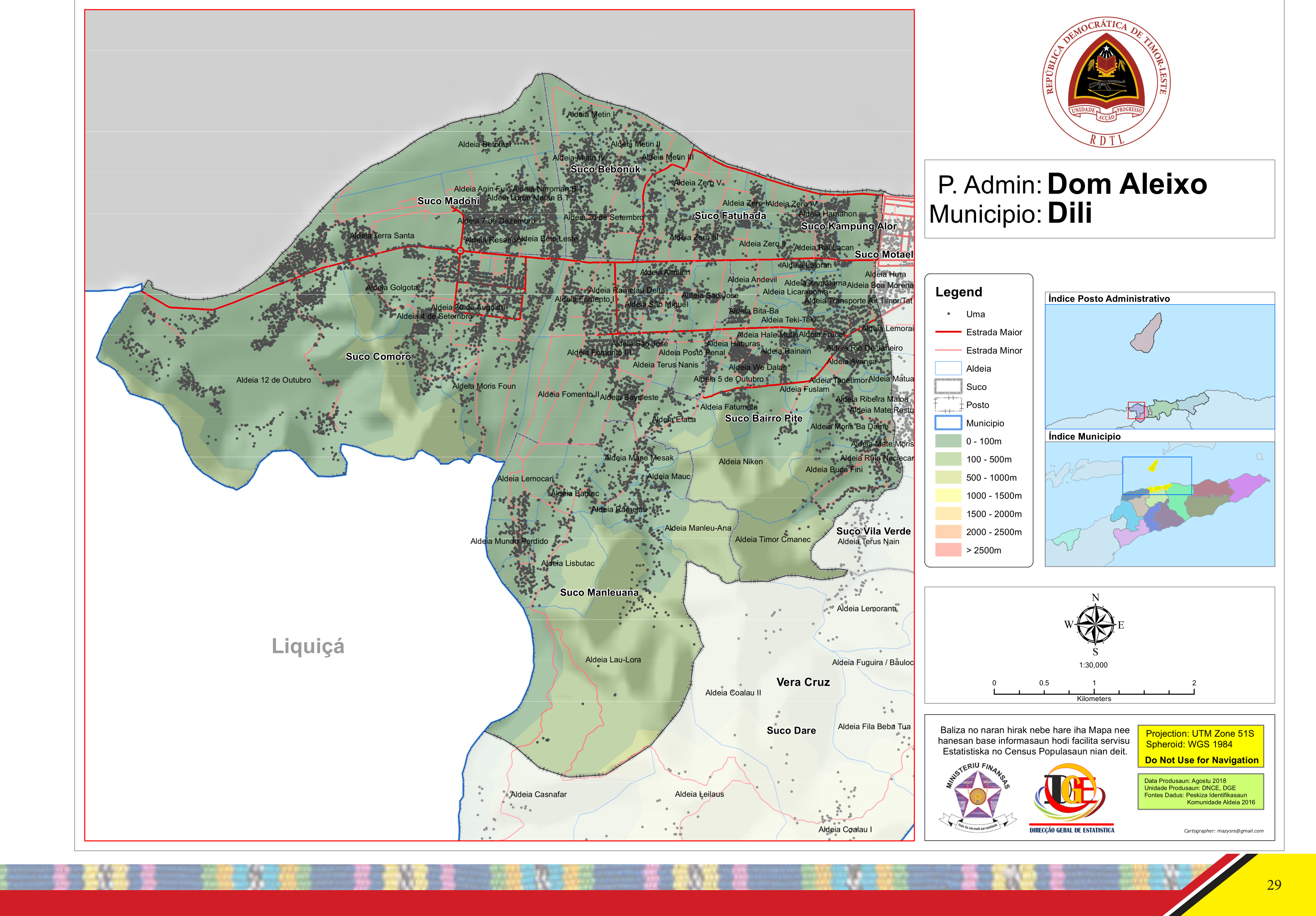
- Official map

- Location within East Timor
- Coordinates: 8°32′48″S 125°31′29″E
- Country: Timor-Leste
- Municipality: Dili
- Seat: Comoro
- Sucos: Bairro Pite; Bebonuk; Comoro; Fatuhada; Kampung Alor; Madohi; Manleuana

Area
  - Total: 25.9 km^{2} (10.0 sq mi)

Population (2015 census)
  - Total: 130,095
  - Density: 5,020/km^{2} (13,000/sq mi)

Households (2015 census)
  - Total: 20,579
- Time zone: UTC+09:00 (TLT)

Dom Aleixo Administrative Post (Portuguese: Posto Administrativo de Dom Aleixo, Tetum: Postu Administrativu Dom Aleixo), is an administrative post in Dili Municipality, Timor-Leste, at the mouth of Comoro River. Its seat or administrative centre is Comoro.

The administrative post is named after Aleixo Corte-Real. Its population at the 2010 census was 105,154. Its area is 33,12 km^{2}.

Dom Aleixo contains the Presidente Nicolau Lobato International Airport, the foreign ministry building, and the main mosque of Timor-Leste. The Tasitolu salt lakes are in the most western part of Dom Aleixo in Comoro suco.

== Education ==
Secondary schools in Dom Aleixo include Colégio São Miguel Arcanjo, Escola Paroquial de São Pedro, Escola Secundária Geral An-Nur, Escola Secundária Geral Nicolau Lobato, Externato de São José, and Escola Secundária Santa Madalena de Canossa.
