= Tasi Tolu =

Protected area in Timor-Leste

Tasitolu; Tasitolu (Portuguese); Tasitolu / Tasi tolu (Tetun)
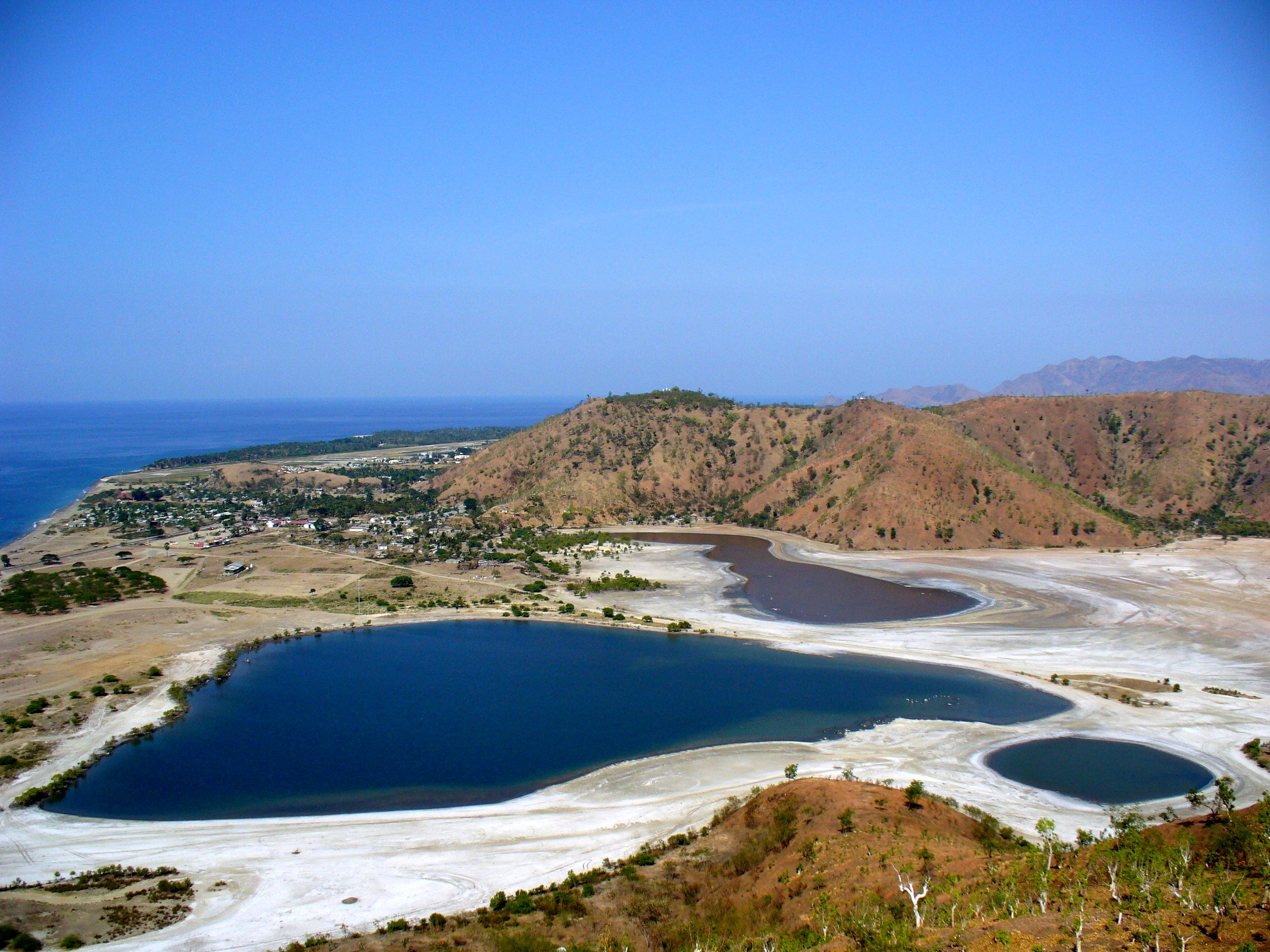
- Location: Comoro / Madohi, Dom Aleixo, Timor-Leste
- Nearest city: Dili
- Coordinates

Tasitolu (Portuguese: Tasitolu, Tetun: Tasitolu or Tasi tolu, lit. transl. 'three waters') is a protected area on the coast of Timor-Leste, 8 kilometres (5.0 mi) west of the capital Dili. The Tasitolu wetlands include three saline lakes, an esplanade, and a beach; it has been designated a Wetland of National Significance. Tasitolu Peace Park was designated in 2002 because of its cultural and historical importance. The Tasitolu Important Bird Area accommodates several near-threatened species. A 2004 reforestation project, which included community member participation, was funded by the national government. Subsequent to the 2006 East Timorese crisis, several hundred people sought refuge at Tasitolu's tent camp, established by the United Nations High Commissioner for Refugees. INTERFET, an Australian-led international military Peace Keeping Force governed by the United Nations, has established a base at Tasitolu.

== Geography ==
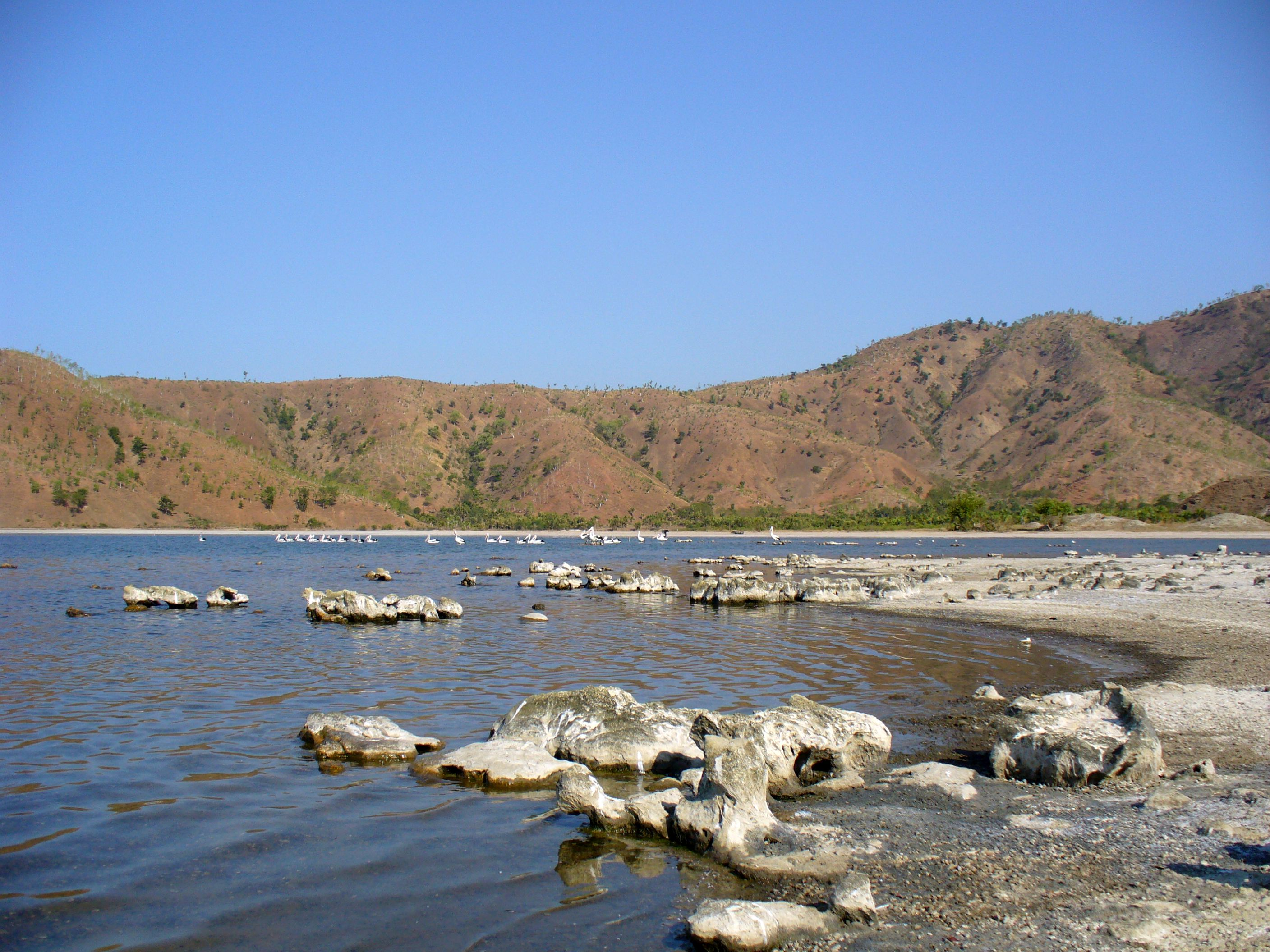
Lakeshore

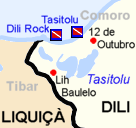

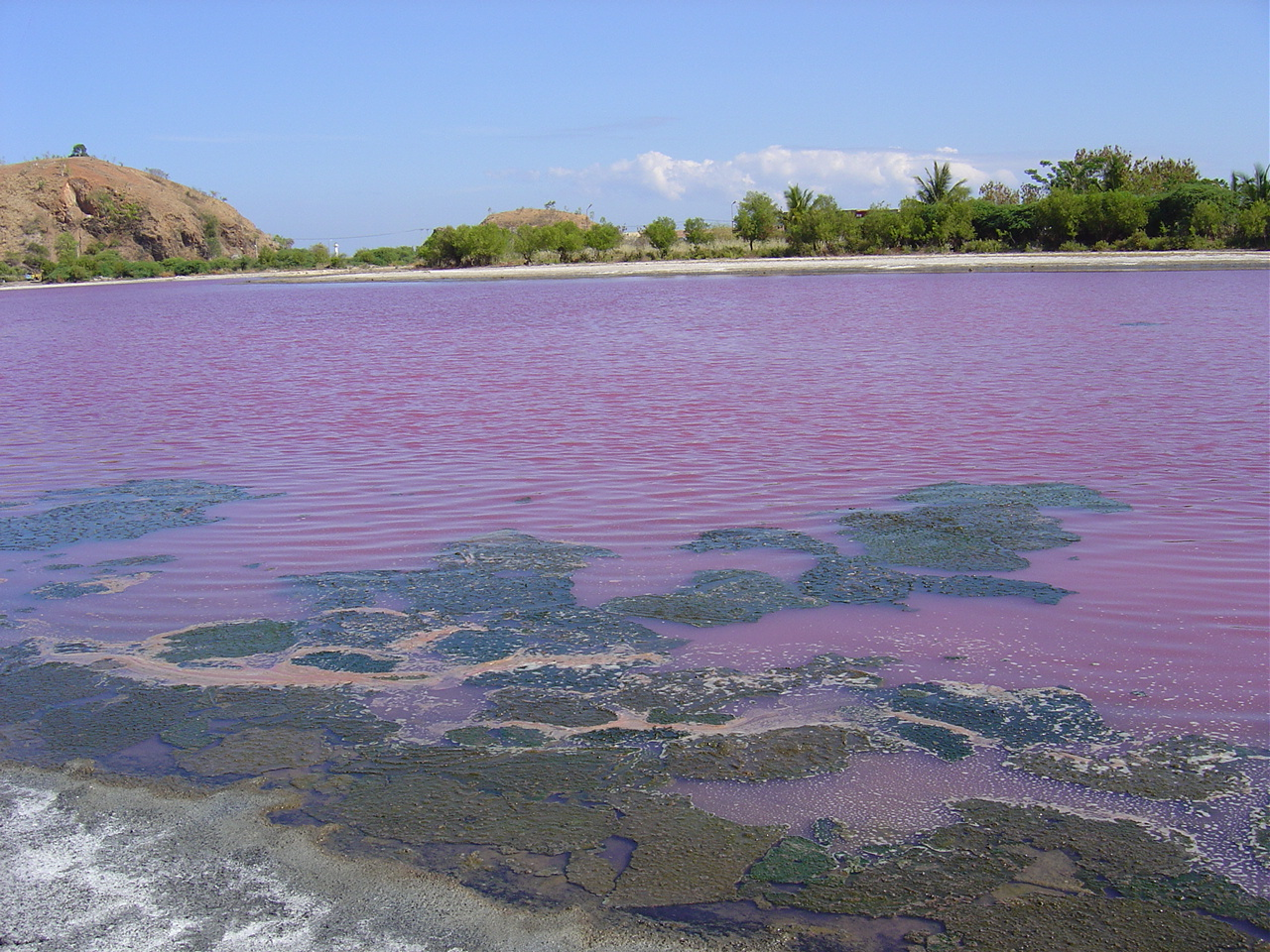
Red coloration, 2006.

Tasitolu lies in the west of the Comoro Suco, in the Dom Aleixo subdistrict. It is part of the Dili District, which is the smallest of Timor-Leste's thirteen districts, while being the most heavily populated, and the economic and political center of the country. Situated on the northern coast of Timor island, which is the easternmost of the Lesser Sunda Islands, Tasitolu is on the Wetar Strait/Strait of WetarSavu Sea. It is accessed by the Dili-Kupang Road. Tasitolu Bus Station is located 500 metres (1,600 ft) to the north of the easternmost lake, and another transportation hub, the Presidente Nicolau Lobato International Airport, is 1,500 metres (4,900 ft) away.

Lying at an altitude of 0–403 metres (0–1,322 ft) above sea level, the 700 hectares (1,700 acres) protected area (whole area: 1,540 hectares (3,800 acres)) consists of three permanent, shallow, saline lakes, and wetland surrounds. In some years, the water of the lakes turns red, probably due to red algae. There are also headwater ridges and a beach. The beach area has several dive sites which are developed for tourists. Reef visibility is excellent, there are no currents, and the sandy bank slopes gradually. A narrow, saline esplanade is situated between the mountain and sea. Tasitolu, Areia Branca, Hera, Metinaro, and Tibar are part of a coastal wetlands network of extensive mudflat and mangrove habitats.

== History ==
Some people believe that the lake water turns red because many victims of the invaders during the Indonesian occupation (1975–1999) are buried here. The fact that the last colorations occurred in the years 1975, 1999 and 2006, all years when Timor-Leste had to cope with violent events (the Civil War and the Indonesian invasion in 1975, the crisis in 1999, and the unrest in 2006), also leads to superstition regarding the coloration. Tasitolu was at one time a popular meeting place for the ABRI; and subsequent to the 1975 invasion, many Maubere people were killed here, some through death flights.

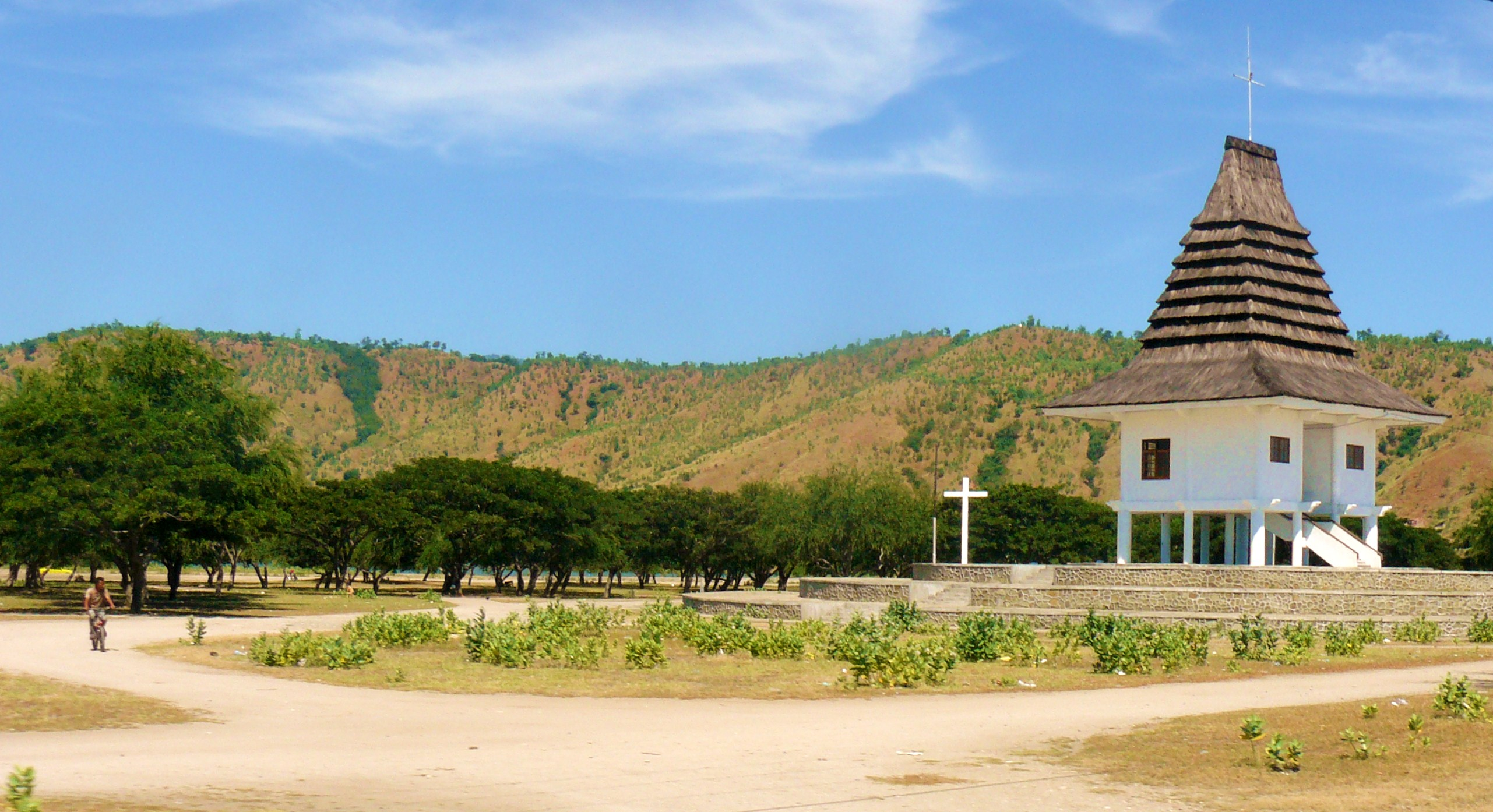
Church of Tasitolu

Approximately 400 metres (1,300 ft) from the central lake, a traditional house was built in preparation for the 1989 visit of Pope John Paul II. He arrived in October, addressing a crowd at the "Tasitolu Altar", and spoke the local Tetum language, as well as English. Subsequent to his death, a 6 metres (20 ft) high monument dedicated to the Pope was erected in 2008; it stands on a hill on the west side of the Bay of Dili, across from a statue of Jesus Christ in Cristo Rei subdistrict on the east side. A chapel next to the statue reminds of his visit.

It was at Tasitolu that in 2002, Timor-Leste declared its independence. Tasitolu was designated by the Timor Leste Government as a Peace Park on 20 May 2002, due to its social and historical importance. Two hundred trees were planted at the Peace Park on 12 February 2004, when it was launched by President Xanana Gusmão. In recent years, an international military Peace Keeping Force base has been established at Tasitolu.

During the 2006 conflict approximately 150,000 people in Timor-Leste left their homes and sought refuge as internally displaced persons (IDP) at what became a tent camp with limited facilities at Tasitolu, one of six Transitional Shelters in Dili District. IBA (Important Bird Area) Tasitolu was established in 2007. In late October 2008, plans for a five-star hotel with 350 rooms in Tasitolu were discussed; it would be the first luxury hotel in the country, to be built in 2012 between two mountain ridges, with a 27-hole golf course situated between the lakes and a business park. During excavations for the hotel, the remains of nine people were found, victims of the Indonesian occupation. The two who wore Portuguese military uniforms, are believed to have been freedom fighters of the Falintil. Also in 2008, approximately 100 bodies were found near Tasitolu in the Delta Comorro. In September 2009, the Minister of Social Solidarity announced that Tasi Tolu Transitional Shelter would close, and that the effected families would receive assistance through recovery or reintegration packages. On the country's ten-year anniversary of independence, in 2012, Tasitolu was again the site of an historic event when the new President Taur Matan Ruak, took over the office from José Ramos-Horta.

In 2024, Pope Francis became the second Pope to hold a mass at the site. An estimated 600,000 people, nearly half the country's population, attended a mass Pope Francis held at Esplanade of Tasitolu.

== Flora and fauna ==
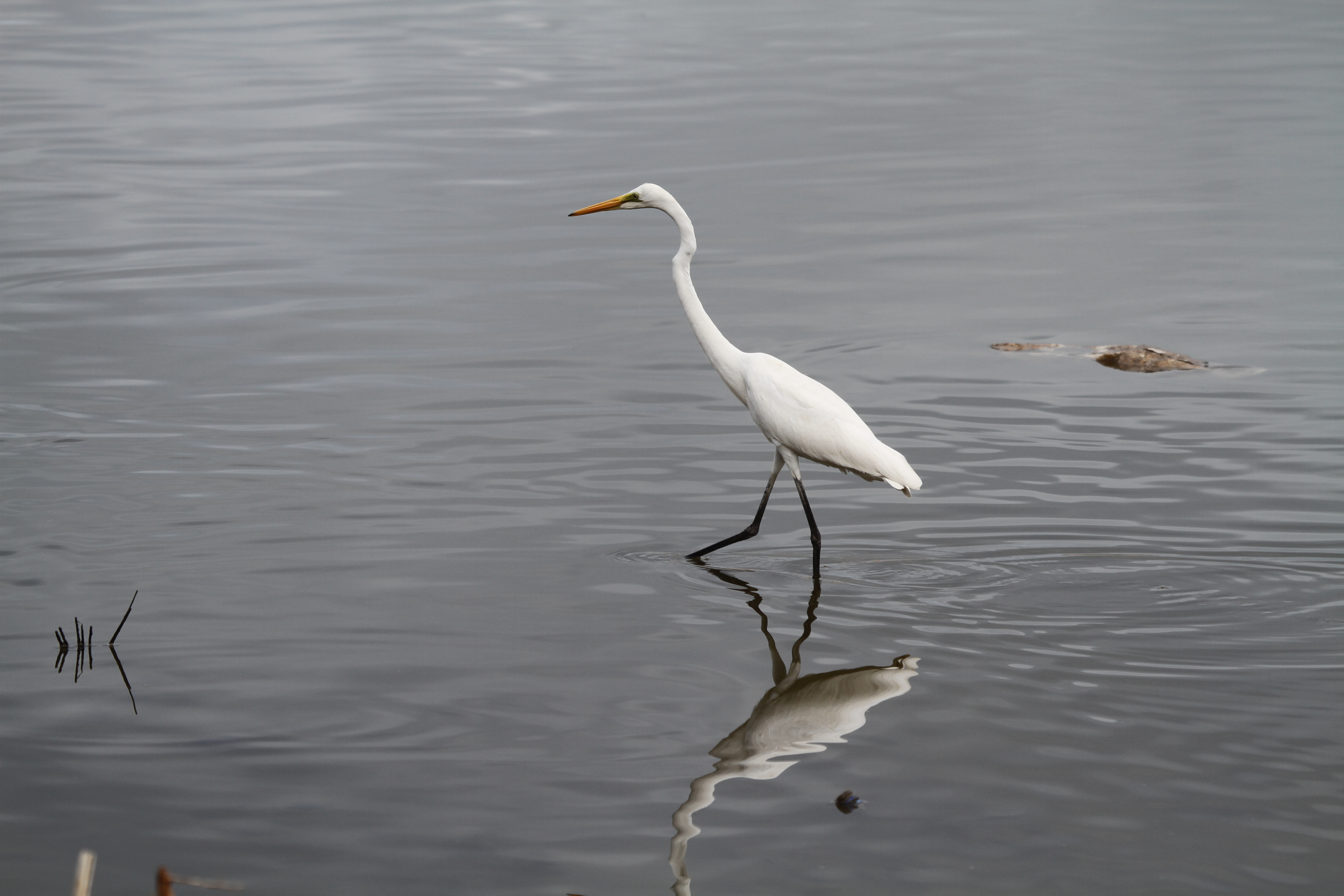
A Great Egret strolling along a glassy Lake Tasitolu

In addition to the salt lake, the habitat is characterized as grassland, savanna woodland, and tropical dry forest. There are stands of both mangrove and eucalyptus. Every year, hundreds of water birds from Russia arrive during the winter. Many native birds also live in the area. A total of 71 bird species have been reported as observed there, including seven listed as Near Threatened (NT) in the International Union for Conservation of Nature (IUCN) Red List and 15 listed as restricted-range species. The populations of NT species include slaty cuckoo-doves, pink-headed imperial pigeons, olive-shouldered parrots, white-bellied bush chats, and Timor sparrows.

Dugongs are often observed at Tasitolu, although as of 2019 detailed information regarding their habitat location, size, and characteristics in the area was not available. Seagrass, which serves dugongs, is distributed along the Tasitolu beach, and dugongs clearly feed and rely on the seagrass ecosystem. There is also substantial live coral cover in the area. Cephalopods, crustaceans, frogfish, harlequin ghost pipefish, small octopuses, rhinopias, sea horses, and soft coral crabs encompass some of the other sea life at Tasitolu.

== Conservation ==
Tasitolu has been designated a Wetland of National Significance and a Peace Park. The Tasitolu protected area is under threat from human use because of the proximity to the capital city. These threats include timber collection, urban dumping, industrial rock and sand extraction, agriculture, transportation, and tourism. Nature conservation and research constitutes a major land use. As such, a 2004 reforestation project was funded by the Department of Forestry in the Ministry of Agriculture, Forestry and Fisheries, and included community member participation. Tasitolu was not included in the 1982 FAO/UNDP or 1989 Regional Physical Planning Project for Transmigration (RePPProT) surveys. But it was included in the 2000 United Nations Transitional Administration in East Timor (UNTAET) survey, and in 2007, it became the thirteenth area in Timor-Leste to receive the IBA designation. Along with the country's other IBAs, Tasitolu is part of the Timor and Wetar Endemic Bird Area (EBA).

== See also ==
- List of Important Bird Areas in Timor-Leste
- Tibar Bay
