= Tibar Bay =

Bay in Timor-Leste

- Baía de Tibar (Portuguese); Baía Tibar (Tetum)
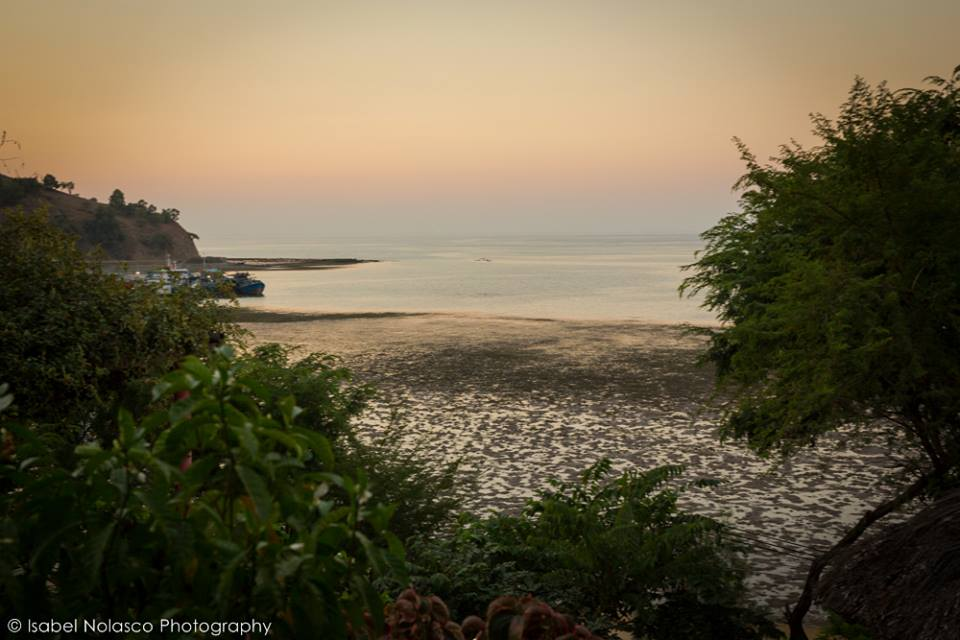
- The west side of the bay in 2015

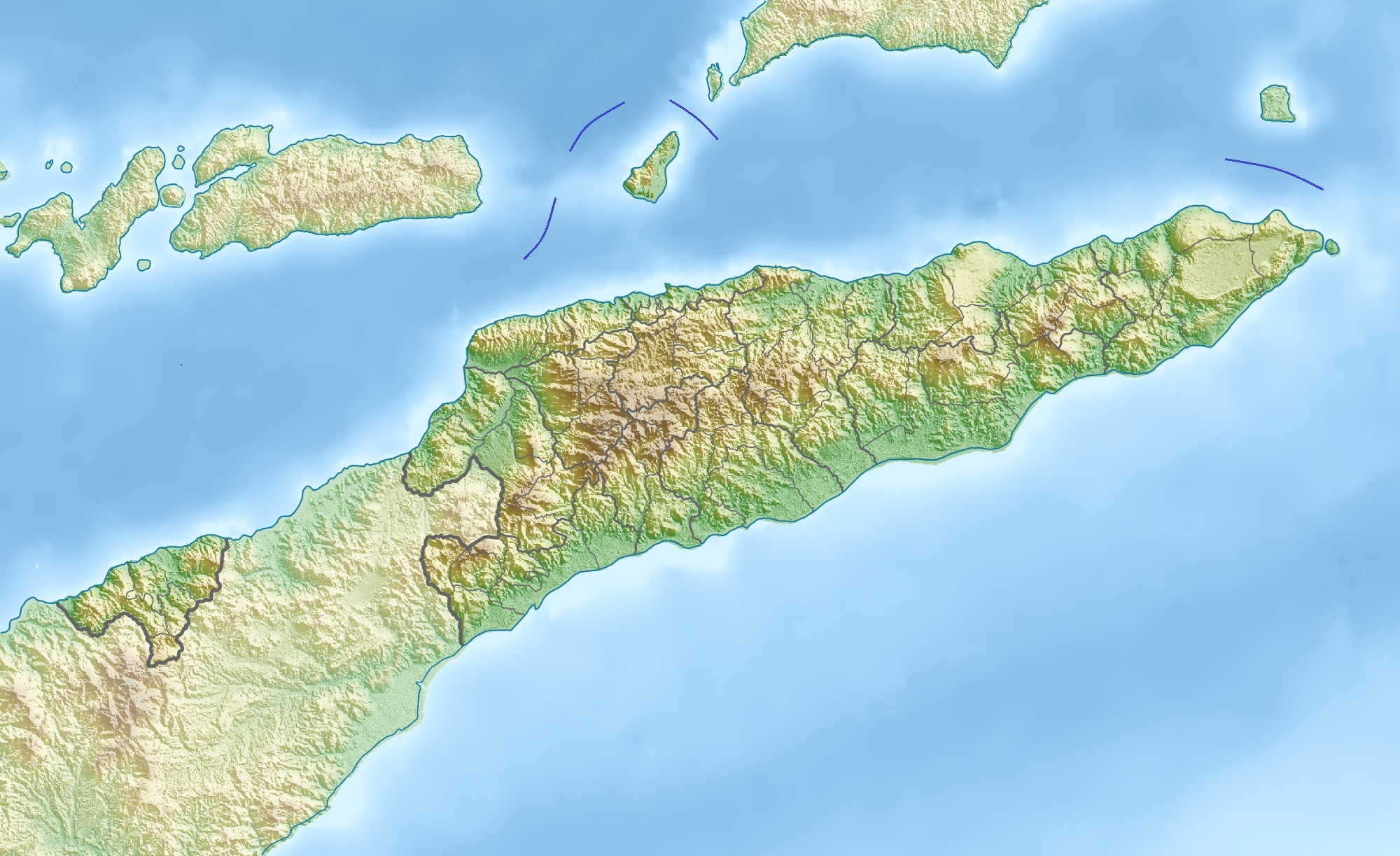
- Location in Timor-Leste
- Location: Tibar, Liquiçá, Timor-Leste
- Coordinates: 8°34′14″S 125°28′38″E
- Type: Bay
- Part of: Ombai Strait
- Catchment area: around 30 km^{2} (12 sq mi)
- Max. length: approx 1.6 km (0.99 mi) east–west
- Max. width: approx 1 km (0.62 mi) north–south
- Surface area: approx 160 ha (400 acres)

Tibar Bay (Portuguese: Baía de Tibar, Tetum: Baía Tibar) is a bay on the north coast of Timor-Leste near Dili, its capital city. The bay forms part of the south shore of Ombai Strait, which separates the Alor Archipelago from the islands of Wetar, Atauro, and Timor in the Lesser Sunda Islands.

== Geography ==
The bay is located approximately 10 km (6.2 mi) west of Dili, the capital city of Timor-Leste, and immediately to the northwest of the similarly named suco of Tibar, which is part of the Liquiçá municipality. It extends approximately 1.6 km (0.99 mi) east-west and 1 km (0.62 mi) north-south (160 ha (400 acres)).

At the entrance to and inside the bay are sizeable areas of coral reef, much of it dead on the reef flats with diverse live coral on the reef slopes. Also within the bay are extensive tidal flats, mainly at the bay's southeastern corner, but also on its western and eastern sides.

The Tibar catchment is medium-sized (around 30 km^{2} (12 sq mi)). It drains into the bay's southern side via defined watercourses and, in large storm events, across a delta (located behind the main highway). The catchment runs approximately 6 km (3.7 mi) south, to an elevation of 750 m (2,460 ft) AMSL.

== Ecology ==
=== Flora ===
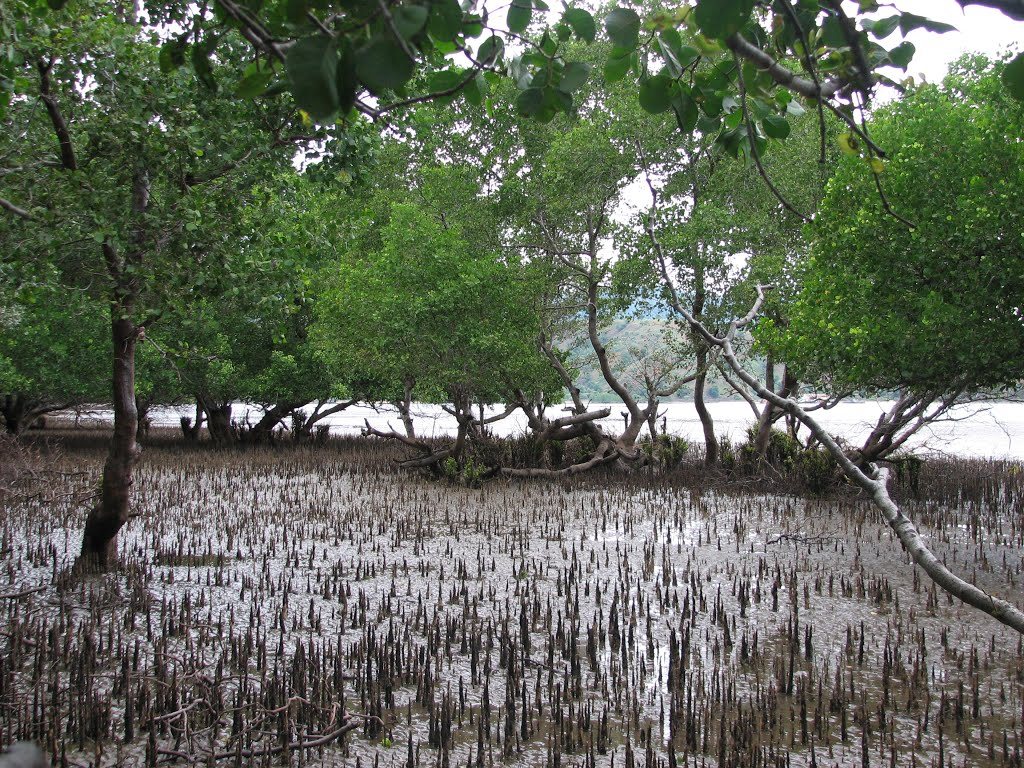
A mudflat, and a mature mangrove patch with aerial roots, in the bay

A survey carried out in 2016 determined that the vegetation in the bay was primarily mangrove forest. Three mangrove species were found, namely Sonneratia alba, which was the dominant species, Avicennia marina and Rhizophora stylosa. The report of another survey, carried out in 2017, stated that the dominant species in the area was Sonneratia albia, and that there were some clusters of Rhizophora apiculata, Ceriops tagal, and Lumnitzera.

The 2016 survey report estimated the total area of mangrove in the bay to be 14 ha (35 acres). Examination of Google Earth imagery showed that approximately 50% of mangrove in the area had been lost since 1984.

The mangrove habitat still in place as of 2016 was mature, but highly degraded through intensive land use, which was completely preventing recruitment of mangrove seedlings. Livestock were eating seeds, aerial roots and young plants, and there was also intensive use of mangrove trees, including as firewood, by local villagers. Some trees at the bay had apparently been ring-barked.

The mangroves in the bay in 2016 represented about 2% of East Timor's total remaining area of mangroves, and were of national significance.

The 2017 survey report estimated the total mangrove area of the bay to be 22 ha (54 acres). Tree density was relatively low, at around 100–400 trees per hectare, and the mangrove cluster was heavily degraded, due to direct and indirect human activities. The former activities included fish pond and salt pan development, mangrove cutting, and cattle grazing. The latter activities were sea level rise, and siltation due to erosion in the hills on the landward side of the mangroves.

There are also two main seagrass meadows in the bay. One is in the western sub-bay, and the other is on the bay's northeast side. A 2013 survey identified four species of seagrass in the meadows, with the dominant ones being Enhalus acoroides, Syringodium isoetifolium and Cymodocea rotundata. Small areas of Halophila ovalis were also present.

=== Fauna ===
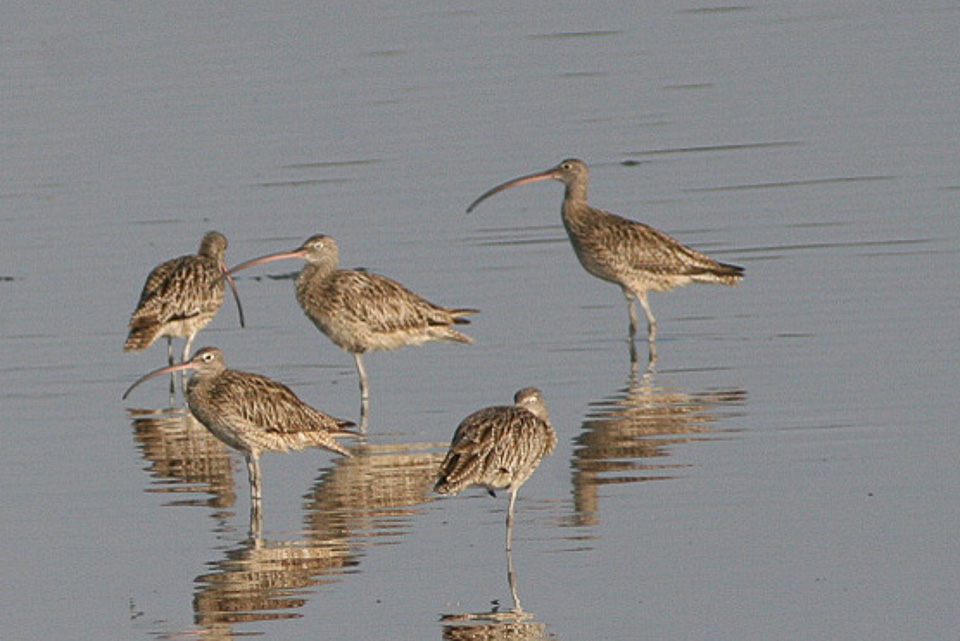
Far Eastern Curlews, photographed in Java, Indonesia

The report of the 2013 survey observed that the bay has complex bathymetry providing diverse benthic habitat, as it is sheltered and receives nutrients from runoff from the nearby land. As such, it may provide recruits to adjacent parts of the coast.

According to the report of the 2016 survey, the fauna habitat at the bay includes the mangrove forest, an estimated 47 ha (120 acres) of intertidal mudflats and sandflats, and terrestrial habitat.

The 2013 survey report noted that a local dive tourism operator had made frequent sightings of dugong along the coast immediately east of the bay, and that there were also anecdotal reports of saltwater crocodiles in the bay. The 2013 report also commented that among the birds living at the intertidal flats are two species listed as Near Threatened on the IUCN Red List: the Malaysian Plover (Charadrius peronnii) and the Black-tailed Godwit (Limnosa limosa).

The 2016 survey recorded a total of 104 bird species in the bay and its vicinity, including 39 shorebird species, 27 other waterbirds and 48 landbird species. Two of the shorebird species so recorded are considered globally Endangered (Far Eastern Curlew (Numenius madagascariensis) and Great Knot (Calidris tenuirostris)), a further eight of the recorded shorebird species are considered Near Threatened, and two of the landbirds and one of the waterbirds are similarly considered as Near Threatened.

Many of the recorded shorebirds are of highly specialised migratory species that depend on intertidal habitat. Although the size of congregations of these migratory species was mostly low (<200–400 individuals), a high diversity of species had been recorded at the bay (25 migratory species). The site therefore qualified as critical habitat, following the International Finance Corporation (IFC) Performance Standard 6 (Biodiversity Conservation and Sustainable Management of Living Natural Resources).

=== Humans ===
As of 2013, the bay community included 25 fisher-families greatly reliant upon the marine resources of the area. The bay is the only part of its section of coast providing a sheltered anchorage for vessels relatively close to valuable deep water fishing grounds. On the bay's eastern side, there is a natural channel close to the shore giving access to the deep water.

Inside the bay, the mangroves are heavily used by the local residents, and the tidal flats are a primary source of the residents' food.

The 2013 survey identified eight cultural heritage sites in the bay, including freshwater springs used extensively by the local community, and special prayer and offering sites. The report of the survey noted that there was potentially also a ninth, submerged, site on the bay's southeastern side that may have been an historic stone jetty.

== Economy ==
=== Traditional activities ===
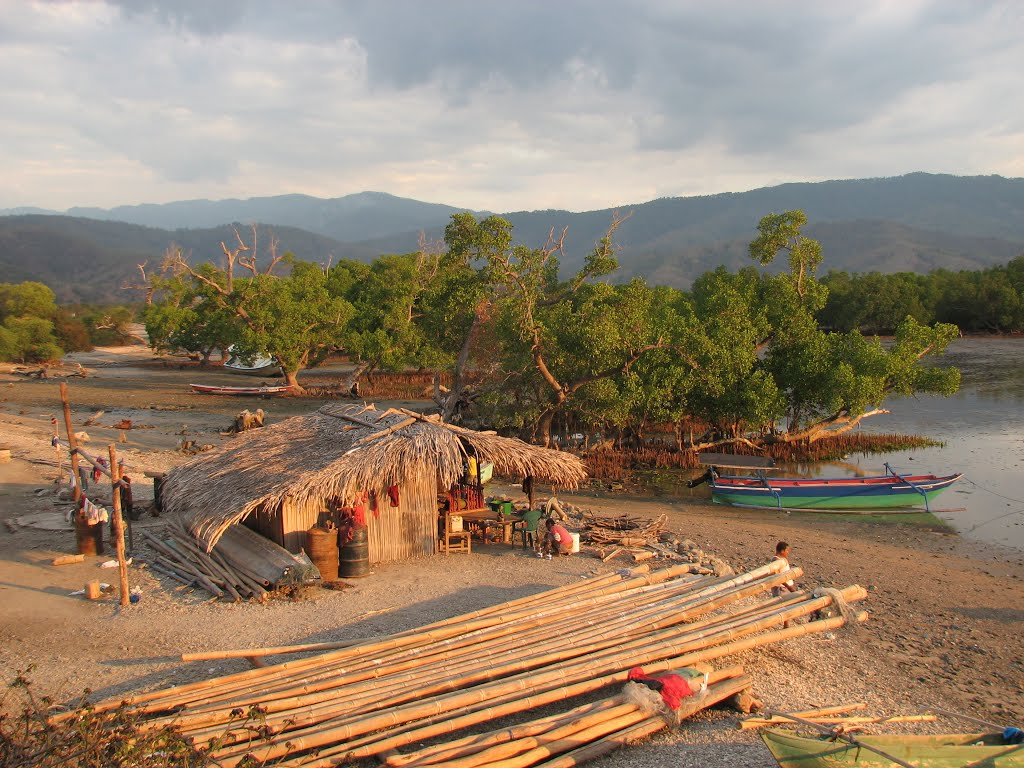
Aquaculture, salt and fishponds in the bay, and an extensive mature mangrove patch, in 2006

The local community's primary economic activity is traditional fishing in the bay and along the nearby coast. Immediately outside the bay, about 25 fish aggregation devices (FADs), referred to locally as 'rompongs', are moored semi-permanently in deep water to attract pelagic fish.

Other traditional economic activities in and around the bay consist of grazing (cattle, goats and pigs), harvesting of mangrove and mesquites, collection of crustaceans, algae and molluscs for human consumption, fish farming in man-made fish ponds, salt production in salt pans, and the growing of cassava, maize, or mixed vegetables.

Additionally, an extensive band of Avicennia marina landward of the main Sonneratia alba stand appears to have been cleared, for fish ponds, salt pans and firewood.

Further afield, into the catchment, cropping is more important, and there are also tree plantations for supply of wood.

=== Tibar Bay Port ===
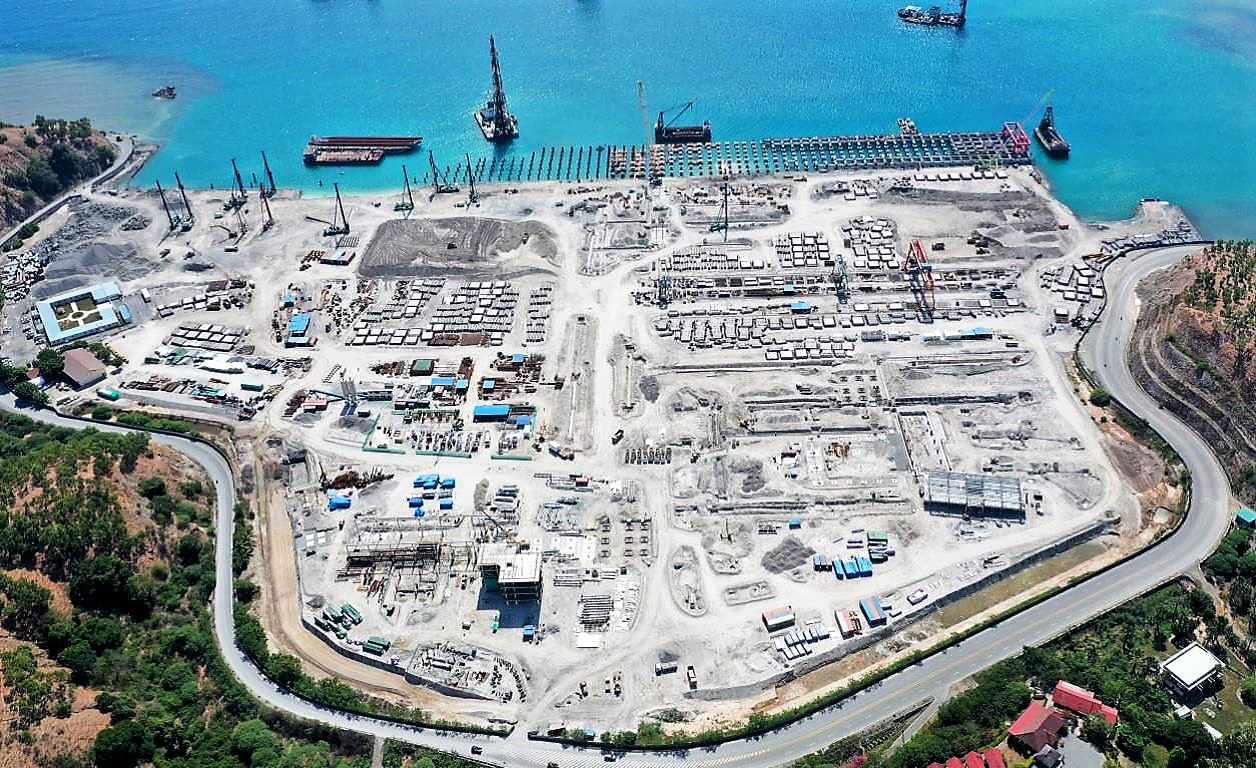
The port under construction in May 2021

In June 2016, the government of Timor-Leste signed an agreement with the Bolloré Group to build and operate a new container port at Tibar Bay. The 30-year concession contract was the first public-private partnership ever undertaken in Timor-Leste. At a value of US$490 million, it also amounted to the country's largest ever private investment.

The greenfield Tibar Bay Port project was intended to replace the existing Port of Dili with a modern container port that would be able to handle up to 350,000 TEU annually. The new port was planned to consist of a 630 m (2,070 ft) wharf with a 15 m (49 ft) draft, and a 29 ha (72 acres) container yard.

Subsequently, Bolloré Group contracted with China Harbour Engineering Company to construct the new port.

Construction was declared to be underway in June 2017 and August 2018, and was originally scheduled to be completed by the end of 2020. However, issues with funding and subcontracting delayed progress, and the official ceremony launching the project was not held until 15 July 2019. As of mid 2021, the port was expected to open in May 2022; it eventually opened on 30 September 2022.

=== Other infrastructure ===
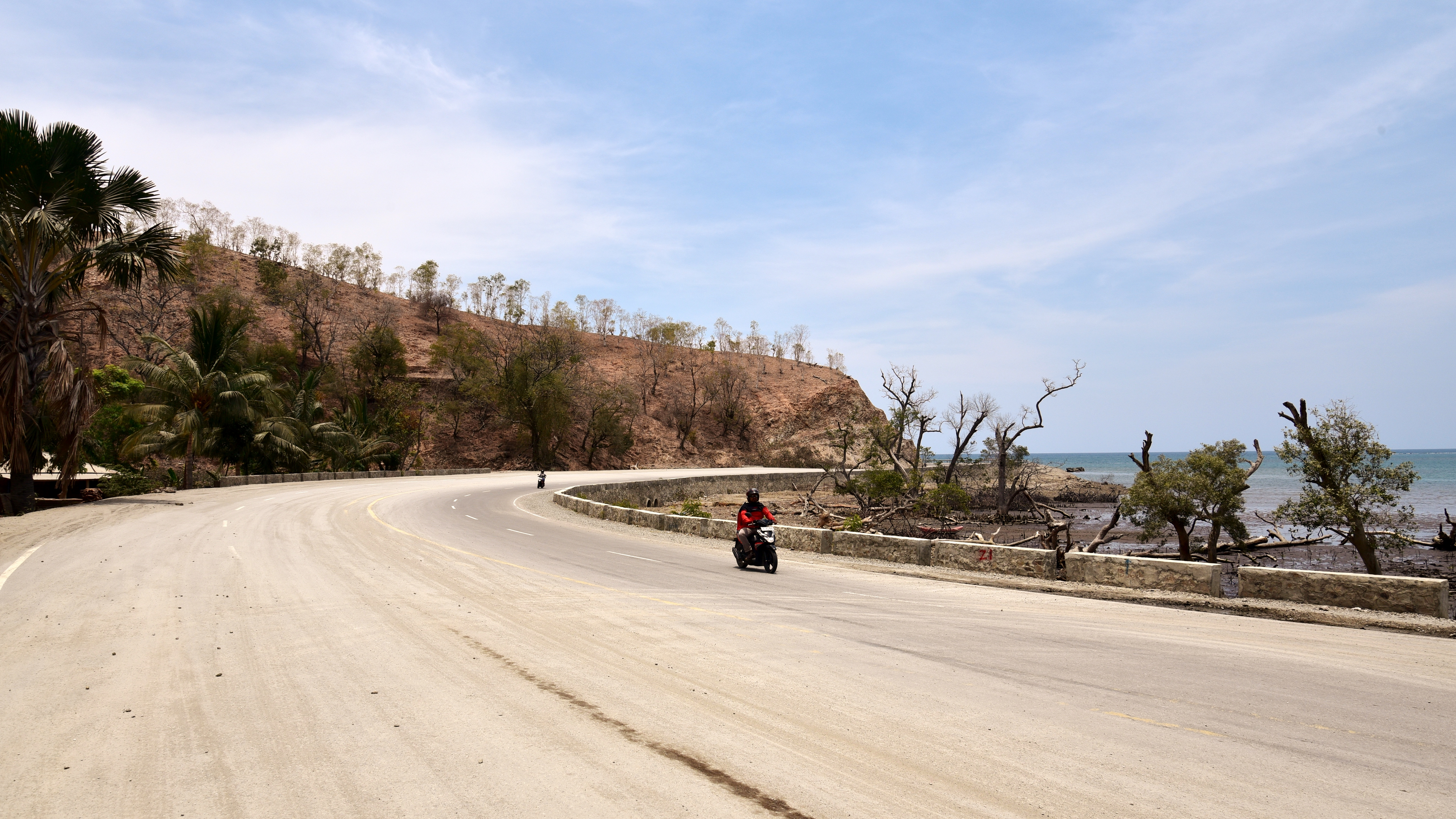
National road A03-02 in 2018

There is a major road intersection on the southeastern side of the bay. From that intersection:

- national road A03-01 runs along the eastern side of the bay towards Dili (7.2 km (4.5 mi) away);
- national road A03-02 runs around the rest of the bay and then heads west to Liquiçá (21.4 km (13.3 mi) away); and
- national road A04-01 branches off southwards, through Tibar catchment, towards Gleno, Ermera and Maliana (31.9 km (19.8 mi) away).

On a small hill on the southwestern corner of the bay is Tibar Bay Retreat. In the catchment south of the bay are a water treatment plant and waste dump, as well as schools, a technical training centre, a health clinic and a police post. Other infrastructure in the bay includes a Timorcorp coffee processing plant and an abattoir.

Before construction of the Tibar Bay Port began, there was an oil terminal on the western side of the bay, made up of landside facilities and a 90 m (300 ft) long wharf.

== See also ==
- Bay of Dili
- Tasitolu
