= Dolok Oan =

Beach near Dili, Timor-Leste

Cristo Rei Back Beach; Praia dos Portugueses (Portuguese); Dolok Oan (Tetum)
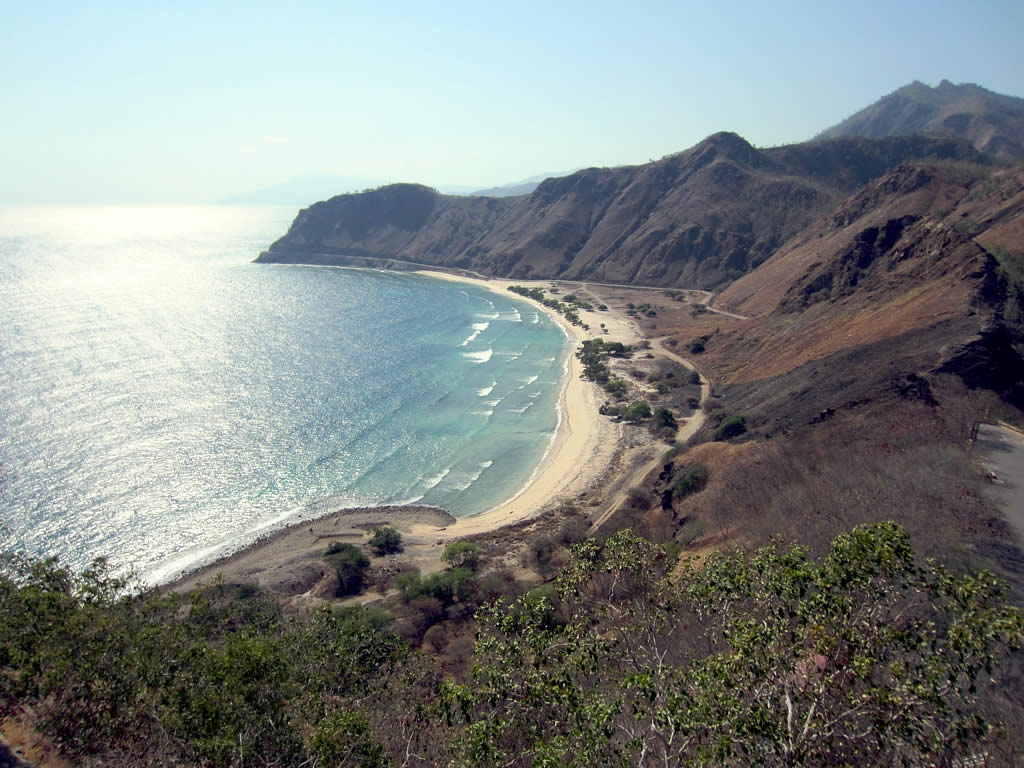
- View of the beach from Cape Fatucama

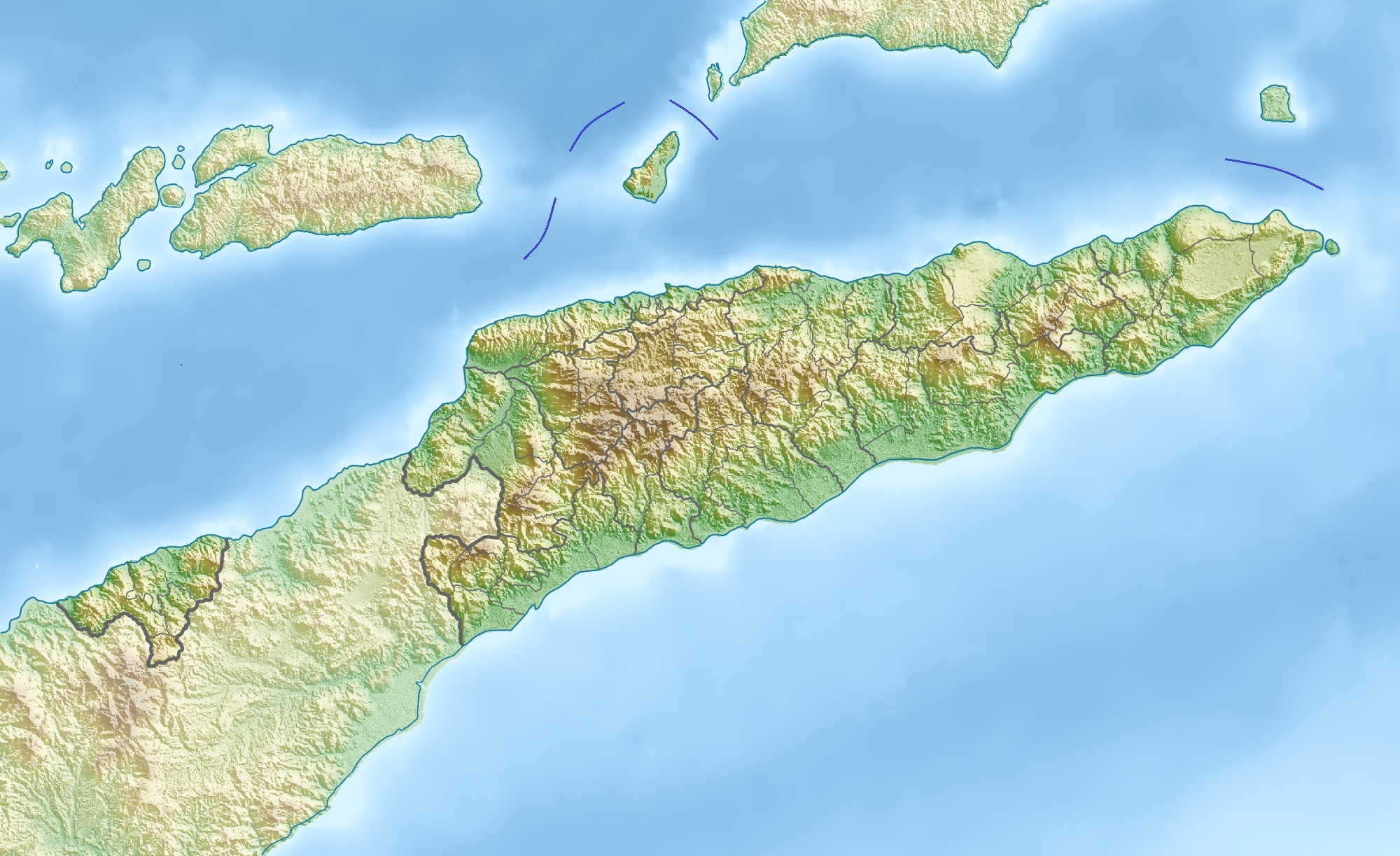
- Location within East Timor
- Location: Hera, Cristo Rei, Timor-Leste
- Nearest city: Dili
- Coordinates: 8°31′19″S 125°36′51″E
- Named for: Cristo Rei of Dili

Dolok Oan (Portuguese: Praia dos Portugueses), also known in English as Cristo Rei Back Beach or Jesus Backside Beach, is a public beach located in the suco of Hera, a short distance northeast of Dili, Timor-Leste. The beach forms part of the south shore of Wetar Strait, immediately to the east of Cape Fatucama.

== Etymology ==
The beach is referred to in Tetum, and also often in English and Portuguese, as Dolok Oan, which is a combination of the words for wet ground (dolok) and child (oan). The beach is also referred to in English as Cristo Rei Back Beach.

The beach's "precise but utterly uncharming" nickname, Jesus Backside Beach, alludes to the colossal Cristo Rei statue located immediately to its west. As the statue faces in a westerly direction, it presents its rear or back side to the beach.

In Portuguese, the beach is often referred to as Praia dos Portugueses (transl. Beach of the Portuguese), which is an allusion to its popularity with National Republican Guard (GNR) troops when they are stationed in East Timor.

== Geography ==
Jesus Backside Beach is composed of white sand and is almost 1 km (0.62 mi) long. It is situated immediately to the east of Cape Fatucama, which is at the north eastern end of the Bay of Dili, about 7 km (4.3 mi) from the centre of Dili, capital city of Timor-Leste.

The beach faces Wetar Strait, the body of water that separates the north eastern shore of Timor from the Indonesian island of Wetar to its north. Its land side is surrounded by steep low hills overlaid with Eucalyptus alba savanna woodland, in which small stands of tropical dry forest are developing. The beach and woodland are both part of the Areia Branca no Dolok Oan Important Bird Area.

At the peak of Cape Fatucama is the Cristo Rei of Dili statue, which is accessible from the car park at nearby Cristo Rei Beach, just inside the Bay of Dili on the other side of the Cape, via a 570-step concrete staircase.

The beach is popular with both locals and tourists. Pedestrian access is provided by a combination of the main staircase to Cristo Rei of Dili and a second concrete staircase descending from about one third of the way up the main staircase. There is also vehicle access, via a rough road that enters the area from the east.

The waves at the beach are stronger than those at the more sheltered Cristo Rei Beach, and some parts of it are fringed by rocky reefs. Good snorkeling is available directly from the shore. Despite the barriers to access, the beach is popular with local residents and tourists on Sundays and holidays, and occasionally also attracts people on company sponsored outings or taking diving lessons.

== Facilities ==
Other than the car park at Cristo Rei Beach, the staircases providing access for pedestrians, and the rough road that gives access to vehicles, the beach is an unspoiled coastline with no facilities. There are no shelters other than the trees, no toilets, no snack shops and no lifeguard station; nothing is available for rent, and there are no hawkers offering food or any other items.

Visitors to the beach have been observed responding to its lack of facilities by bringing their own equipment, such as beach mats and even whole dining sets including tables and chairs. Some of them also set up and use barbecue pits to cook their own food.

== See also ==
- Areia Branca Beach
- One Dollar Beach
- Valu Beach
