= Areia Branca Beach =

Beach in the Bay of Dili, Timor-Leste

Areia Branca Beach; Praia da Areia Branca (Portuguese); Tasi-ibun Areia Branca (Tetum)
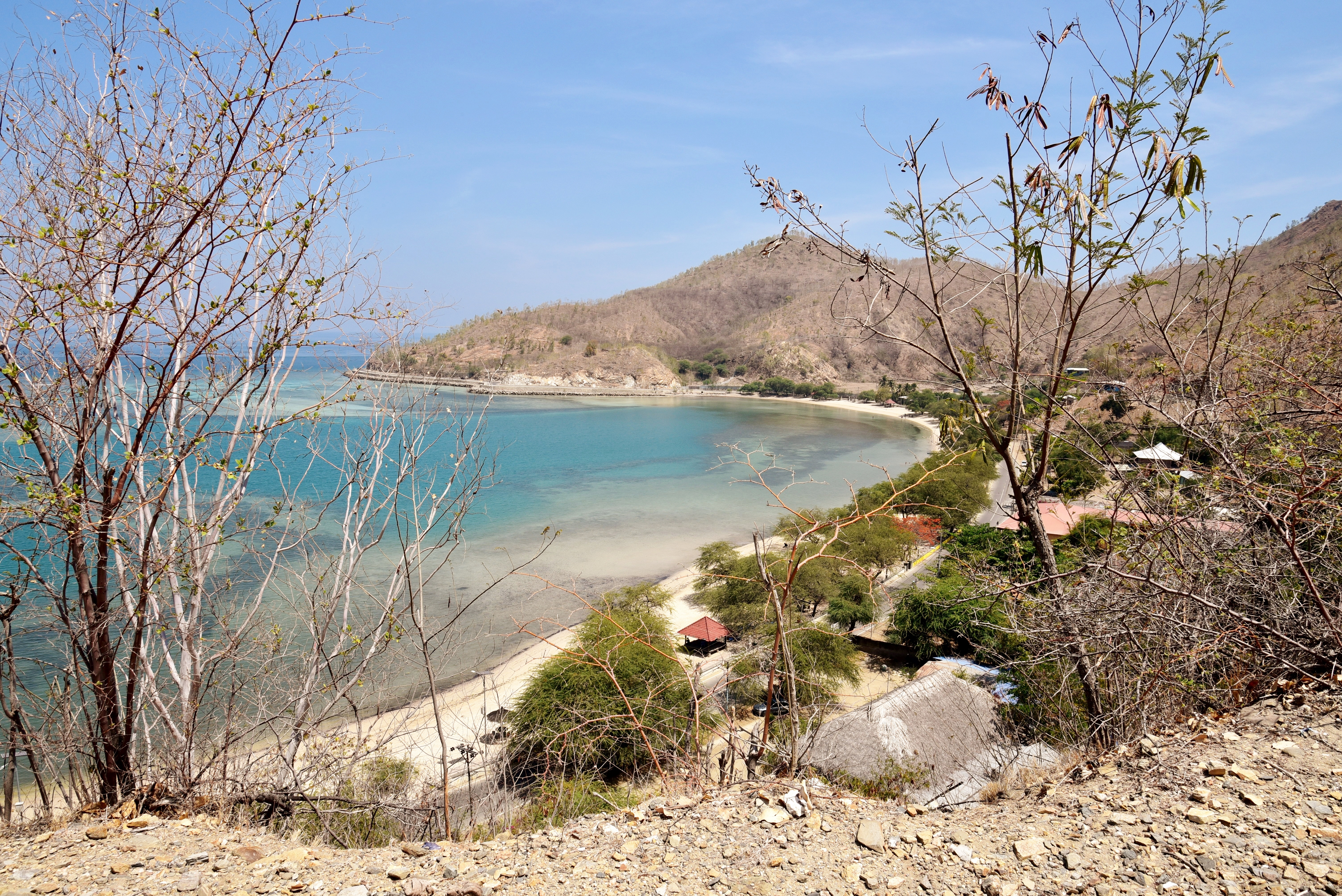
- View of the beach from the road to Hera

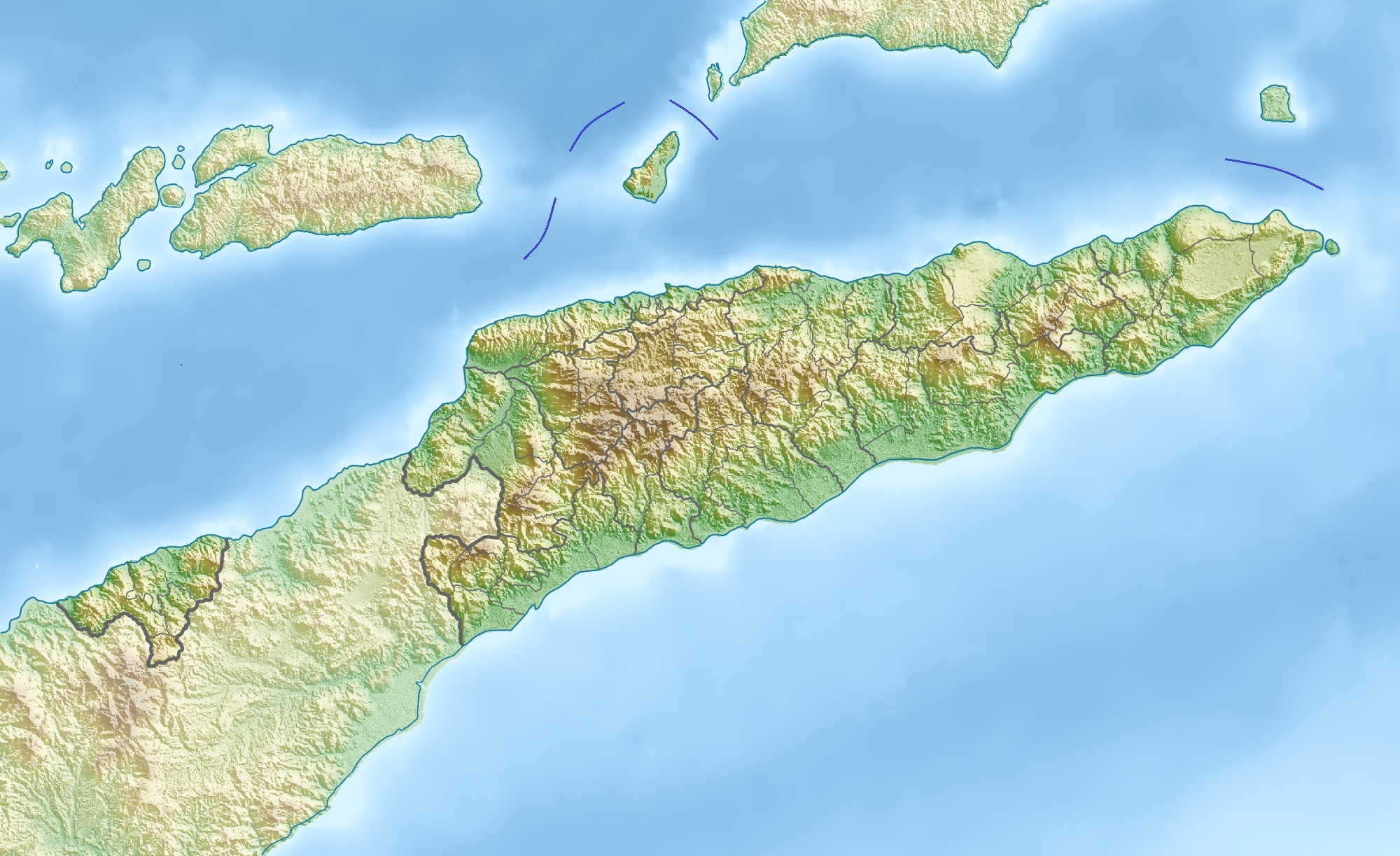
- Location within East Timor
- Location: Avenida de Areia Branca, Metiaut, Cristo Rei, Timor-Leste
- Nearest city: Dili
- Coordinates: 8°31′55″S 125°36′54″E

Areia Branca Beach (Portuguese: Praia da Areia Branca, Tetum: Tasi-ibun Areia Branca) is a public beach on the north eastern shore of the Bay of Dili, in the suco of Metiaut, Timor-Leste. It is very popular with both local residents and tourists.

== Etymology ==
The beach's name, Areia Branca, is Portuguese for "white sand".

== Geography ==
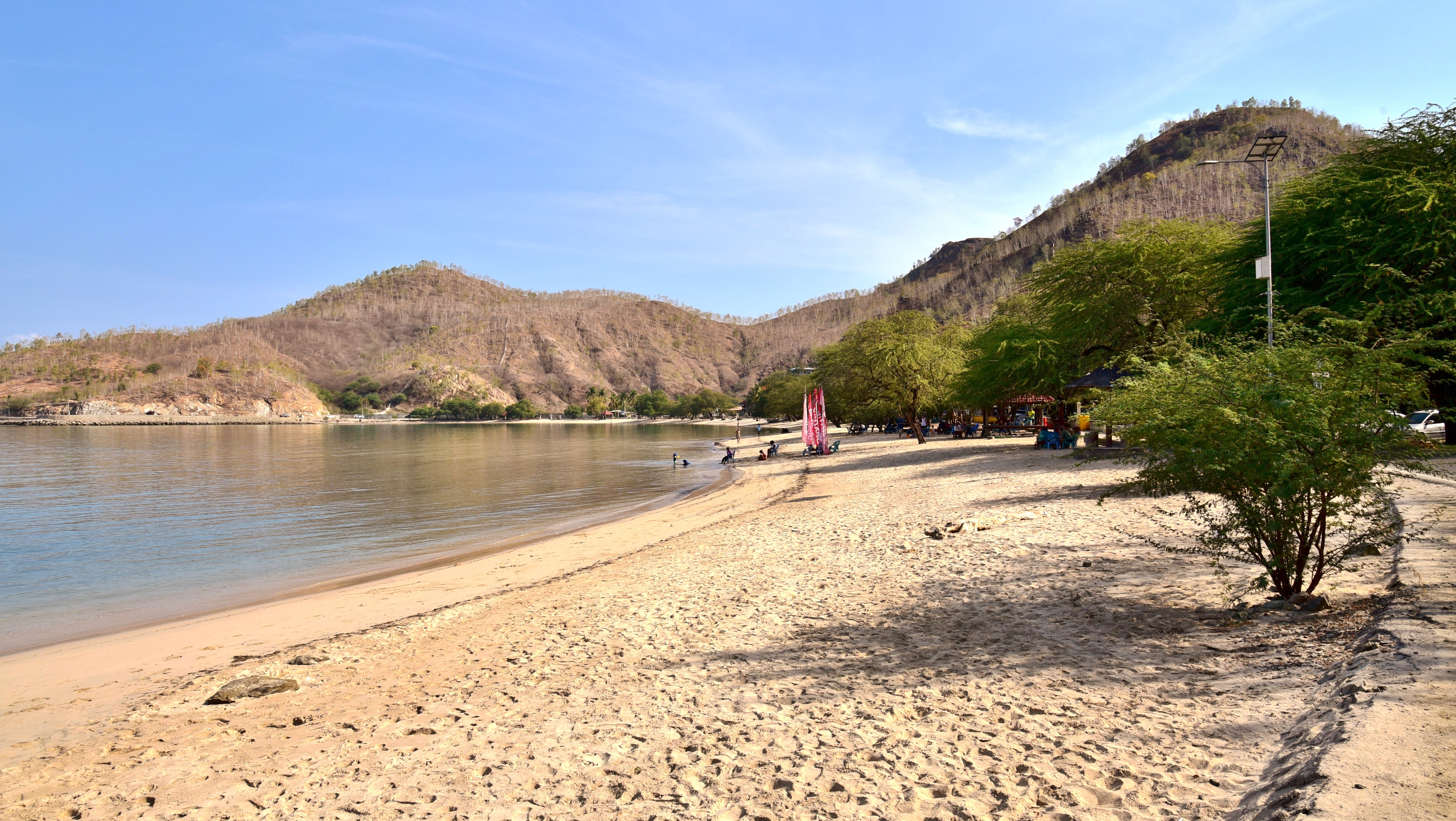
The beach from its southern end

As its name indicates, the beach is white and sandy. It is about 600 m (2,000 ft) long, and located close to the north eastern end of the Bay of Dili, east of the centre of Dili, capital city of Timor-Leste.

On its land side, the beach is fringed by shady trees, and overlooked by steep low hills creating a dramatic backdrop. The hills are covered with Eucalyptus alba savanna woodland, in which small stands of tropical dry forest are developing. The beach and hills are all part of the Areia Branca no Dolok Oan Important Bird Area.

The beach and its environs are one of Dili's and Timor-Leste's most popular beach areas for both local residents and tourists. On Sundays, the beach is often crowded from early in the morning until late at night.

Especially at low tide, the water at the beach is very shallow with a sandy bottom, and therefore suitable for children, but not conducive to swimming by adults. Local residents often walk with spears to the beach's coral breaks to go fishing at low tide. They also commonly shelter under the trees while repairing fishing nets. Other beach users frequently engage in onshore physical recreation, including walking or running along the beach, especially in the early mornings and late afternoons. Yet another, less physical, activity at the beach is watching the sunsets.

== History ==
In the final years of the Portuguese colonial era, the authorities hoped that the Areia Branca Beach would become a tourist destination. With that in mind, a few shelters were built there.

Soon afterwards, the beach was the scene of tragic events. During the invasion and occupation, people were taken to the beach, executed, and dumped into the water; others were shot on the Dili wharf and their bodies were later washed ashore at the beach.

In the early years of the 21st century, particular efforts were made to develop the beach and the area surrounding it into a leisure and tourist destination.

On the morning of 11 February 2008, the then president of Timor-Leste, José Ramos-Horta, was out jogging on the beach when rebel soldiers entered his nearby residential compound. As he walked back there from the beach, the rebels opened fire on him in an assassination attempt. Ramos-Horta was critically wounded in the incident, but survived.

== Facilities ==
The beach is equipped with cabanas that are free to use. Picnic huts and plastic chairs can be rented, and it is possible for beach visitors to participate in boating or kayaking.

During the term of Timor-Leste's IV Constitutional Government (2007–2012), the beach was rehabilitated. Various hospitality facilities were built on the other side of the access road, Avenida de Areia Branca, including bars, restaurants and coffee shops that now sell national and international foods and drinks, and guesthouses.

Hospitality customers can even sit at a table at the beach while sampling a cold coconut, drinking a locally produced coffee, or dining on freshly cooked fish or other seafood with a beer.

== See also ==
- Cristo Rei Beach
- Jesus Backside Beach
- One Dollar Beach
