= Cape Fatucama =

Headland near Dili, Timor-Leste

Cape Fatucama: Cabo Fatucama (Portuguese); Capa Fatu Cama (Tetum)
- Cape
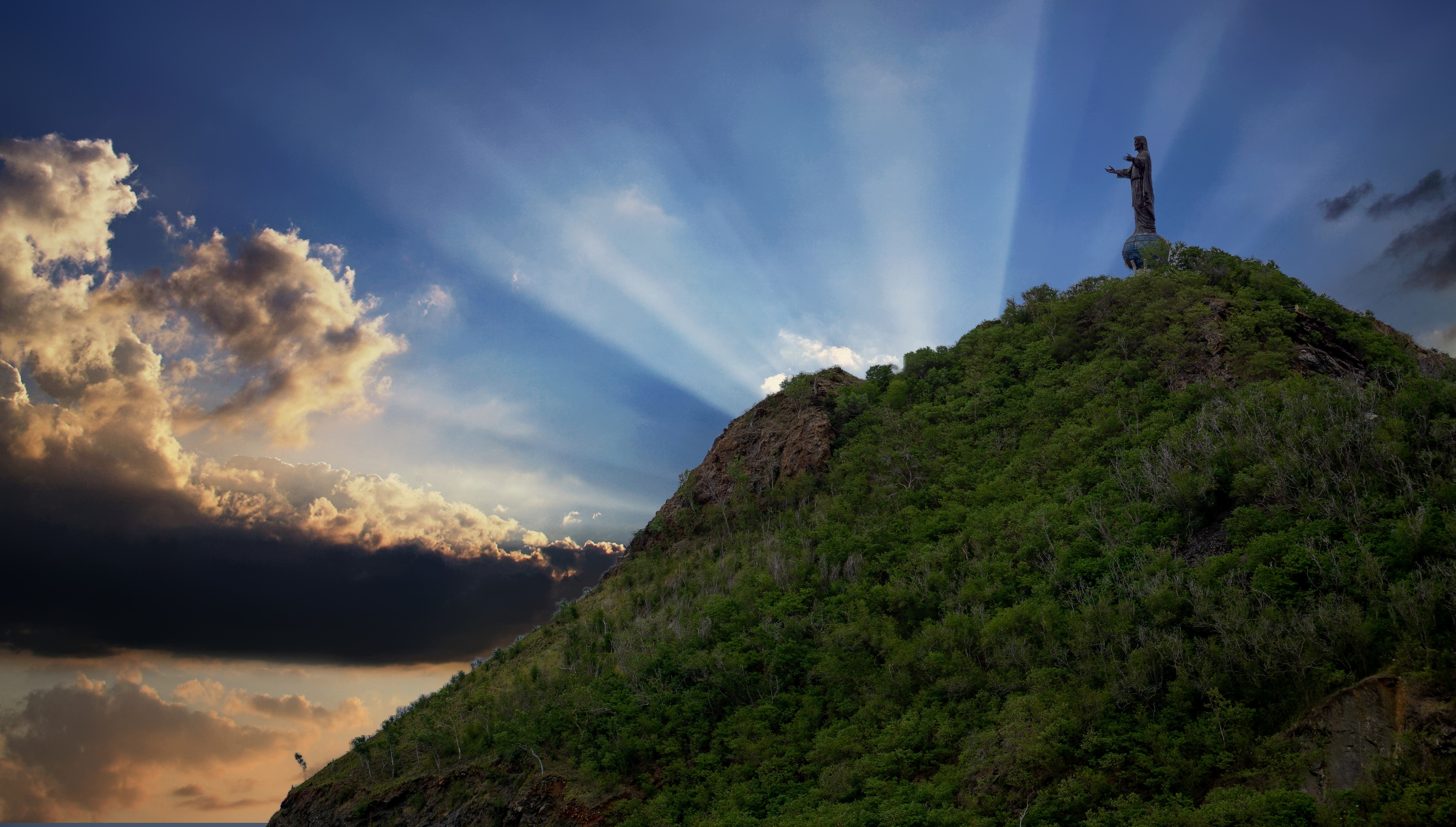
- Early morning view of the Cape

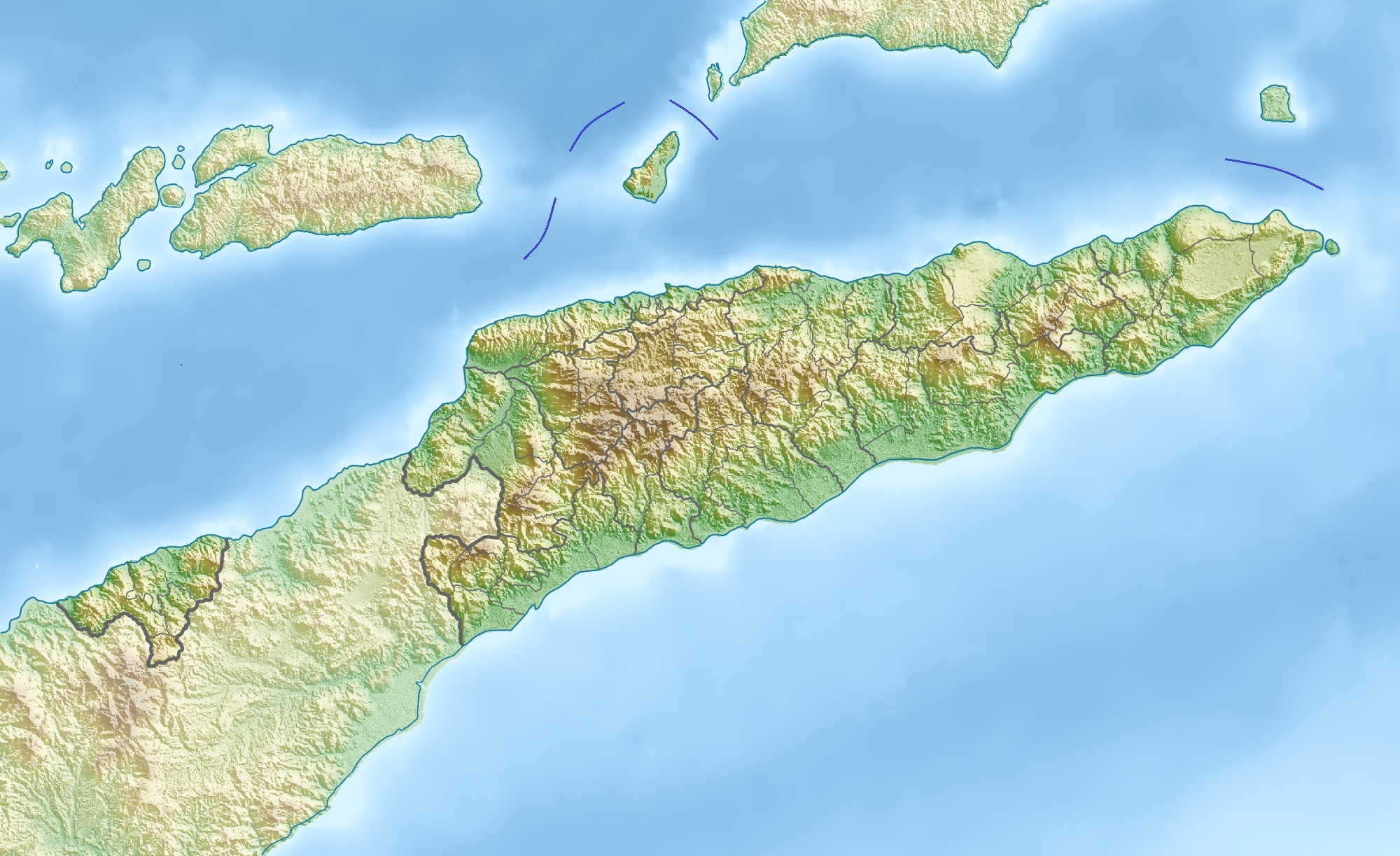
- Location within East Timor
- Coordinates: 8°31′10″S 125°36′28″E
- Location: Cristo Rei, Timor-Leste
- Water bodies: Bay of Dili; (part of Ombai Strait); Wetar Strait; (part of Banda Sea)

Cape Fatucama (Portuguese: Cabo Fatucama, Tetum: Capa Fatu Cama) is a cape or large headland a short distance north east of Dili, on the north coast of Timor-Leste. It is best known as the site of the Cristo Rei of Dili, a colossal statue of Jesus Christ.

== Etymology ==
According to Cliff Morris's Tetun-English Dictionary (1984), Fatu means stone or rock, and Kama means bed.

== Geography ==
The cape is located at the north eastern end of the Bay of Dili, about 7 km (4.3 mi) from the centre of Dili. It marks the southern end of the transition between Ombai Strait, of which the bay is part, and Wetar Strait, between the north eastern shore of Timor and the Indonesian island of Wetar. It also lies at the northern end of the border between the sucos of Meti Aut (on the border's western side) and Hera (on its eastern side).

To the south of the cape, inside the Bay of Dili, is Cristo Rei Beach, and to the cape's east, facing Wetar Strait, is Jesus Backside Beach, which is sometimes referred to in English as Dolok Oan, its Tetum name.

Since 1996, the Cristo Rei of Dili statue has been mounted atop a globe at the peak of the cape. The statue is accessible from the car park at Cristo Rei Beach via a 570-step concrete staircase. Pedestrian access to Jesus Backside Beach is provided by a combination of that main staircase and a second concrete staircase descending from about one third of the way up the main staircase.

The cape, and the two beaches flanking it, all form part of the Areia Branca no Dolok Oan, a 2,916 ha (7,210 acres) Important Bird Area (IBA). The cape's slopes, like the other hills in the IBA, including the hills on the land sides of the two beaches, are vegetated with savanna woodland dominated by Eucalyptus alba.
