= Cristo Rei Beach =

Beach in the Bay of Dili, Timor-Leste

Cristo Rei Beach; Praia de Cristo Rei (Portuguese); Tasi-ibun Cristo Rei (Tetun)
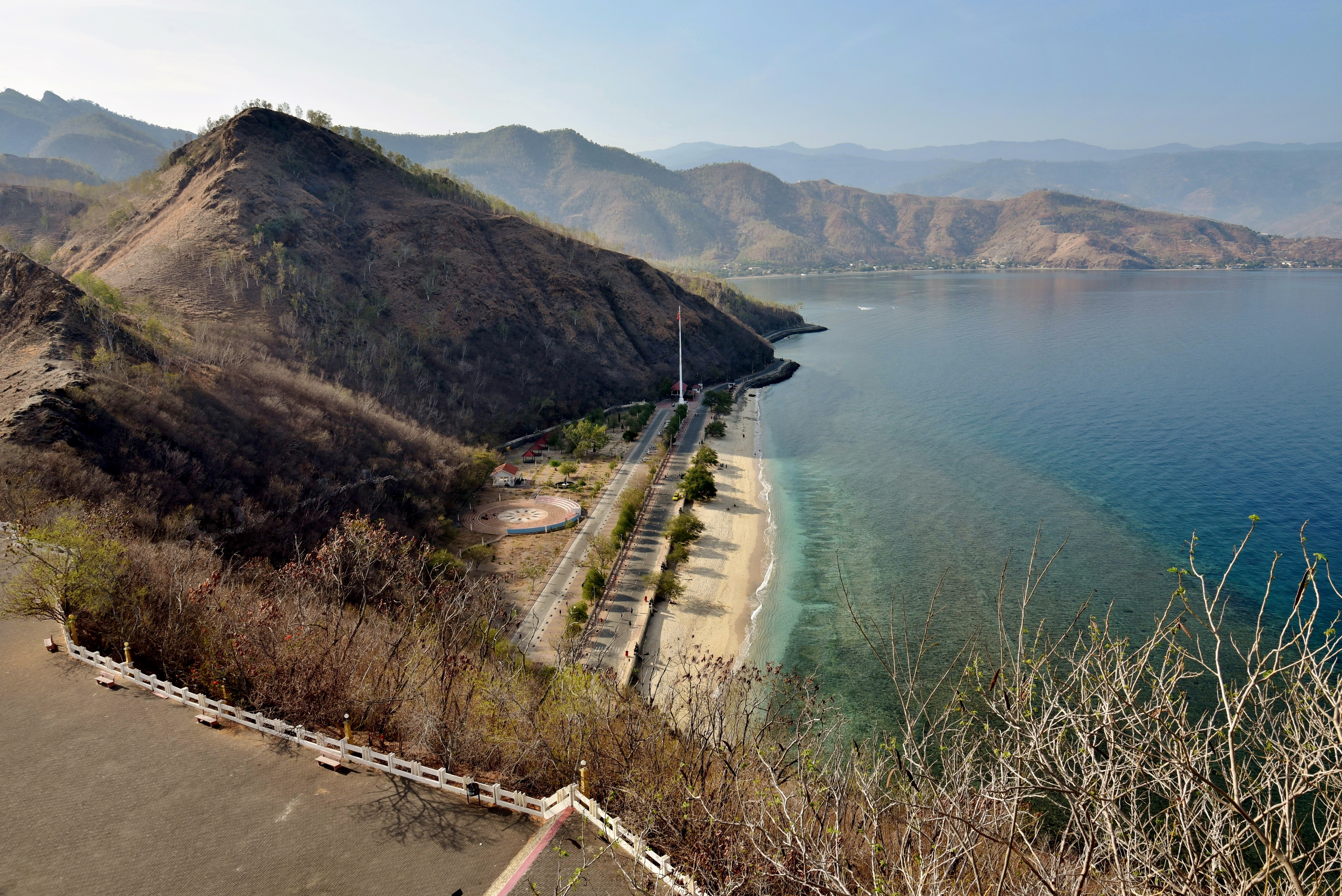
- View of the beach from Cape Fatucama

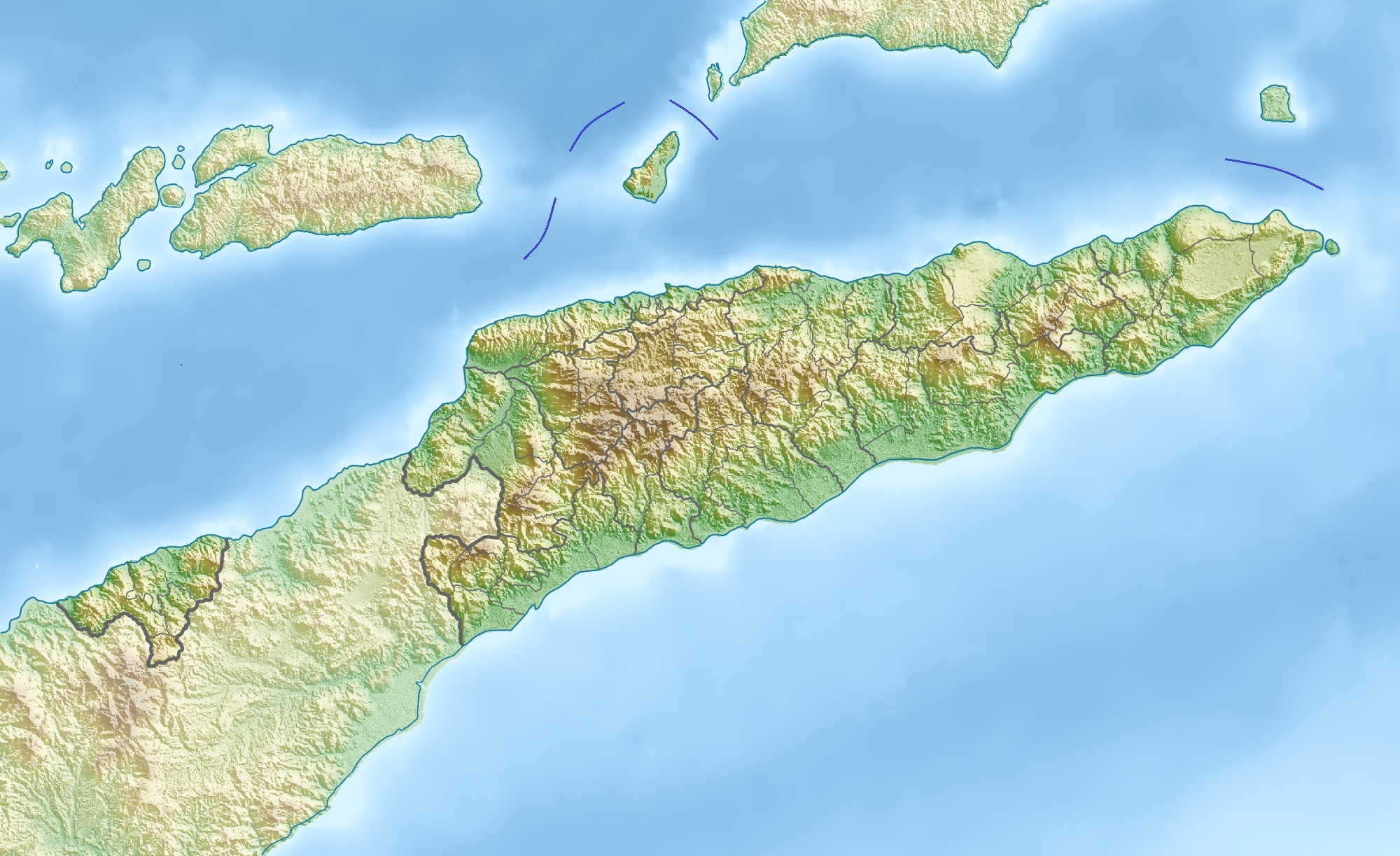
- Location within East Timor
- Location: Avenida de Areia Branca, Metiaut, Cristo Rei, Timor-Leste
- Nearest city: Dili
- Coordinates: 8°31′23″S 125°36′33″E
- Length: 0.87 km (0.54 mi)
- Named for: Christ the King

Cristo Rei Beach (Portuguese: Praia de Cristo Rei, Tetun: Tasi-ibun Cristo Rei) is a public beach facing the Bay of Dili in the suco of Metiaut, Timor-Leste.

== Etymology ==
The beach takes its name from the colossal Cristo Rei of Dili statue immediately to its north.

== Geography ==
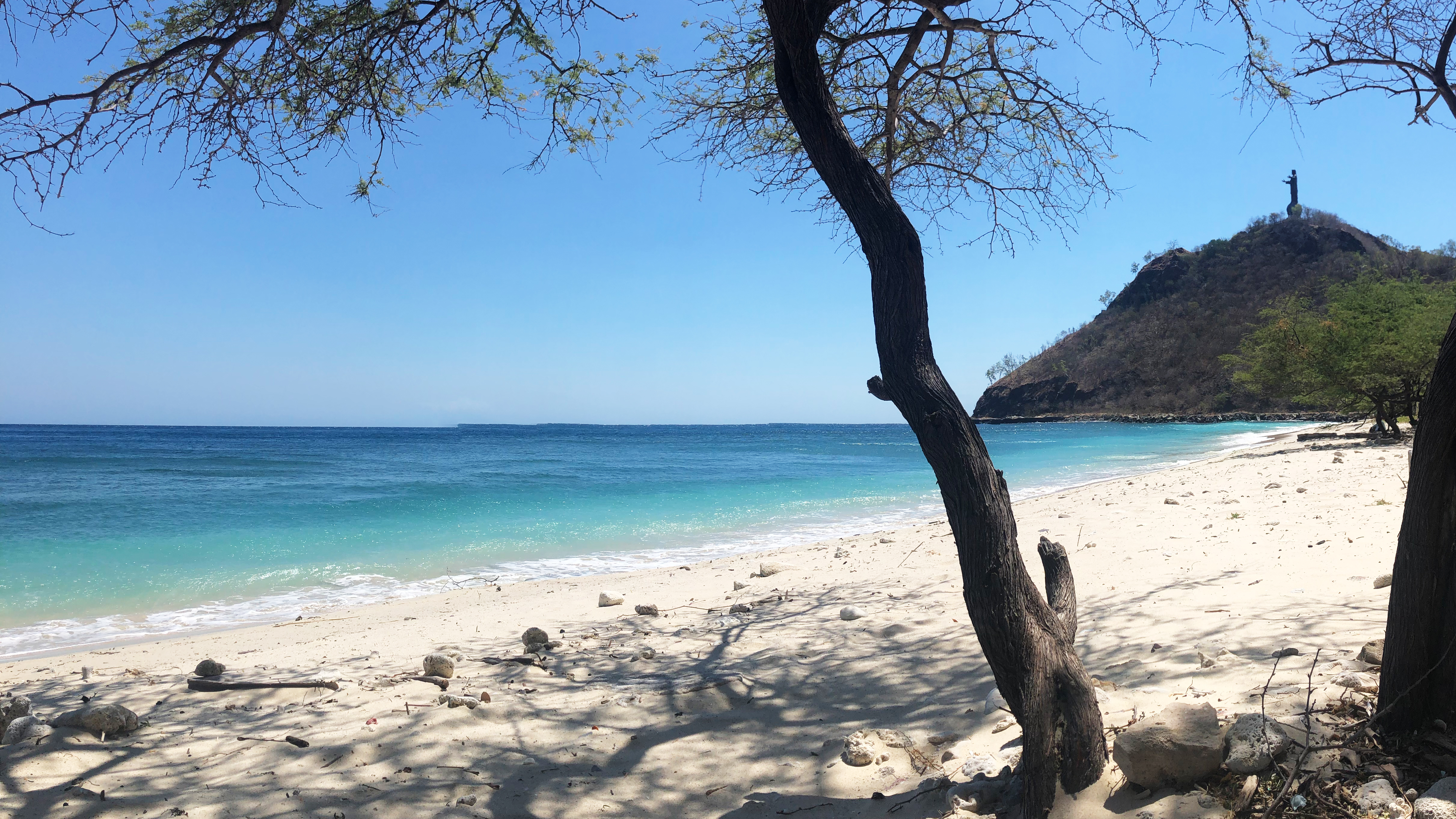
The beach with Cristo Rei of Dili in the background at right

Cristo Rei Beach is composed of clean white sand and is about 0.87 km (0.54 mi) long. It is located at the north eastern end of the Bay of Dili, about 7 km (4.3 mi) from the centre of Dili, capital city of Timor-Leste.

On its land side, the beach is surrounded by steep low hills overlaid with Eucalyptus alba savanna woodland, in which small stands of tropical dry forest are developing. The beach and hills are all part of the Areia Branca no Dolok Oan Important Bird Area.

Due to the beach's sheltered position inside the bay, it has only gentle waves. Immediately to the north of the beach are Cape Fatucama and the Cristo Rei of Dili statue at its peak; the statue is visible from the shoreline, and accessible from the beach's car park via a 570-step concrete staircase.

On the other, eastern, side of Cape Fatucama, and accessible via the same staircase, is Jesus Backside Beach, so named because the Cristo Rei of Dili statue faces in the opposite, western, direction.

At weekends, Cristo Rei Beach is popular with local residents because of its gentle waves and sandy bottom, and food vendors congregate there to hawk packed lunches. On weekdays, the beach is mostly deserted.

== Facilities ==
The beach is separated from its access road, Avenida de Areia Branca, by a stone wall, with entrances surmounted by sculptures of monkeys. On the other side of the Avenida are a car park and shelters that have been described as perfect for a picnic lunch.

In the early years of the 21st century, particular efforts were made to develop the area into a leisure and tourist destination. During the term of East Timor's IV Constitutional Government (2007–2012), various other facilities were constructed at the beach, including gazebos, bathrooms, and water tanks.

== See also ==
- Areia Branca Beach
- One Dollar Beach
