= Valu Beach =

Beach in East Timor

Valu Beach; Valu Sere (Fataluku); Tasi-ibun Valu (Tetum); Praia Valu (Portuguese)
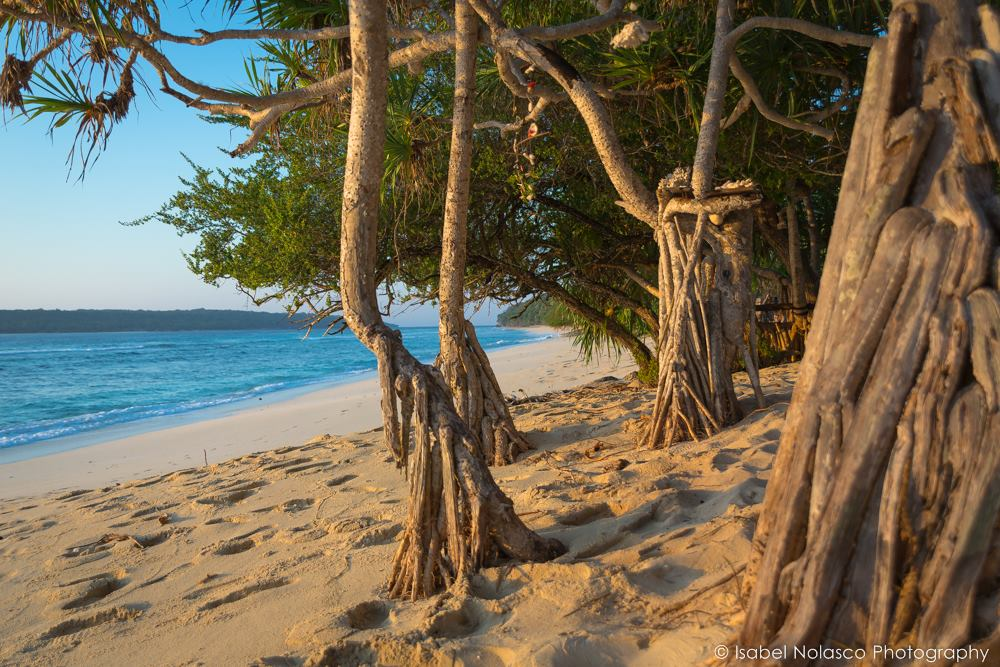
- Valu Beach in 2015 with Jaco Island in the background at left

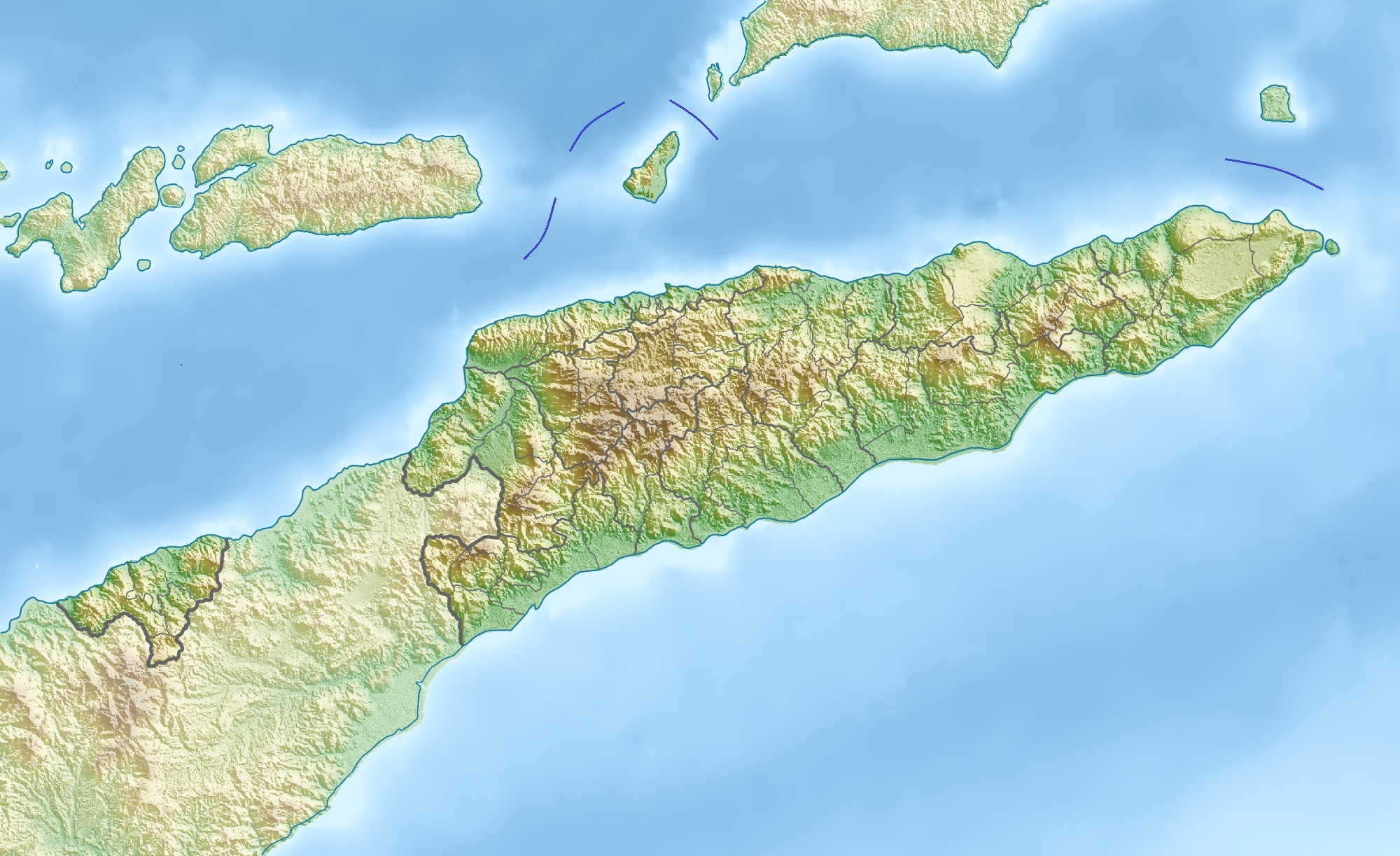
- Location within East Timor
- Location: Tutuala, Lautém, East Timor
- Nearest city: Lospalos
- Coordinates: 8°24′44″S 127°18′01″E

Valu Beach (Fataluku: Valu Sere, Tetum: Tasi-ibun Valu, Portuguese: Praia Valu) is a public beach at the easternmost tip of mainland East Timor, and the gateway to Jaco Island to its east.

== Geography ==
The beach is located in the suco of Tutuala, Lautém municipality, opposite Jaco Island. It is made up of white sand, and is partly surrounded by ancient virgin forests. Its waters are translucent, and suitable for swimming, snorkelling, and diving.

Local people claim that the beach is "... a place of great spiritual, cultural, historical and ecological significance not just for Tutuala and Lautem district but for all of Timor-Leste." The beach, suco and island all lie within Nino Konis Santana National Park, the first national park in East Timor.

The beach, the island and the 600 m-wide (660 yd) channel or strait between them (known as Jaco Strait) are sometimes said to be where Timor meets the boundary between the Banda Sea (including Wetar Strait) to the north and Timor Sea to the south. However, according to the standard work Limits of Oceans and Seas, 3rd edition (1953), published by the International Hydrographic Organization (IHO), the only point where Timor meets those two seas is Tanjong Sewirawa (now known as Cape Cutcha), the eastern extremity of the Timorese mainland. Cape Cutcha is a short distance north of the beach, and northwest of Jaco Island.

At the beach and other adjacent beaches, green sea turtles come ashore to lay their eggs. Before the national park was established, some local families would camp at the beaches and keep watch to collect eggs and capture nesting turtles. However, such activities are now prohibited in the national park.

The open area at the back of the beach houses traces of pottery, stone artefacts and shell, along with broken and abandoned contemporary artefacts. Local people say that in the past, local families would exchange pottery, goats and other goods with people from other islands at certain times of the year.

About a 30 minute walk from the beach is Lene Hara cave, the main element of a system of solutional caves in the Lautém municipality. Further afield, about a two hour trek from the beach, is Ile Kére Kére, a limestone overhang. Both sites are decorated with rock art.

== Facilities ==
A road links Tutuala with the beach. The road was previously somewhat treacherous, and therefore helped to protect the island from overtourism, but has since been improved.

The beach is the gateway to Jaco Island, and a fishing co-operative operates boats to carry passengers between the two places. The currents in Jaco Strait are too strong for people to make the journey by swimming across it.

Close to the beach is a community-run eco-resort/guesthouse in shaded grounds, with open-air bungalows. It was opened in 2005, shortly before the national park was created. The facility's buildings are made of local materials such as such as bamboo, grass, palm leaves, and wood. A central hut is used for serving simple local meals (including rice, maize, cassava, sweet batata, and taro, along with local varieties of beans and vegetables), and usually basic supplies are available. There is also a beach campsite

Members of the fishing co-operative catch and cook fish for visiting tourists. They set up temporary shelters for themselves, and keep their boats at the back of the beach, where racks and limestone caverns have been created for the storage of their possessions.

== Culture ==
The major cultural event in the national park is the Mechi ceremony, which is held on the beach and on Jaco Island. The ceremony involves the ritual gathering of and feasting on palolo seaworms (Eunice viridis), which are known as mechi in the local Fataluku language. Two Mechi ceremonies are held each year: in the last quarter of the moon in February, at which time there is a minor Mechi kiik harvest, and at the new moon in March, when the major Mechi boot harvest takes place.

On both occasions, local communities gather at night to conduct the ceremony, as the mechi are photosensitive. The harvested mechi are combined raw with chili and lime to create a marinated salad. The gathering, feasting and associated ritual invocations, singing and dancing mark the beginning of a new agricultural calendar, and are also important in creating, strengthening and renewing bonds and alliances between the participants in the ceremonies.

== See also ==
- Cristo Rei Beach
- Jesus Backside Beach
- One Dollar Beach
