= One Dollar Beach =

Beach near Dili, Timor-Leste

One Dollar Beach; Praia do Dólar (Portuguese); Tasi-ibun Dolar (Tetun)
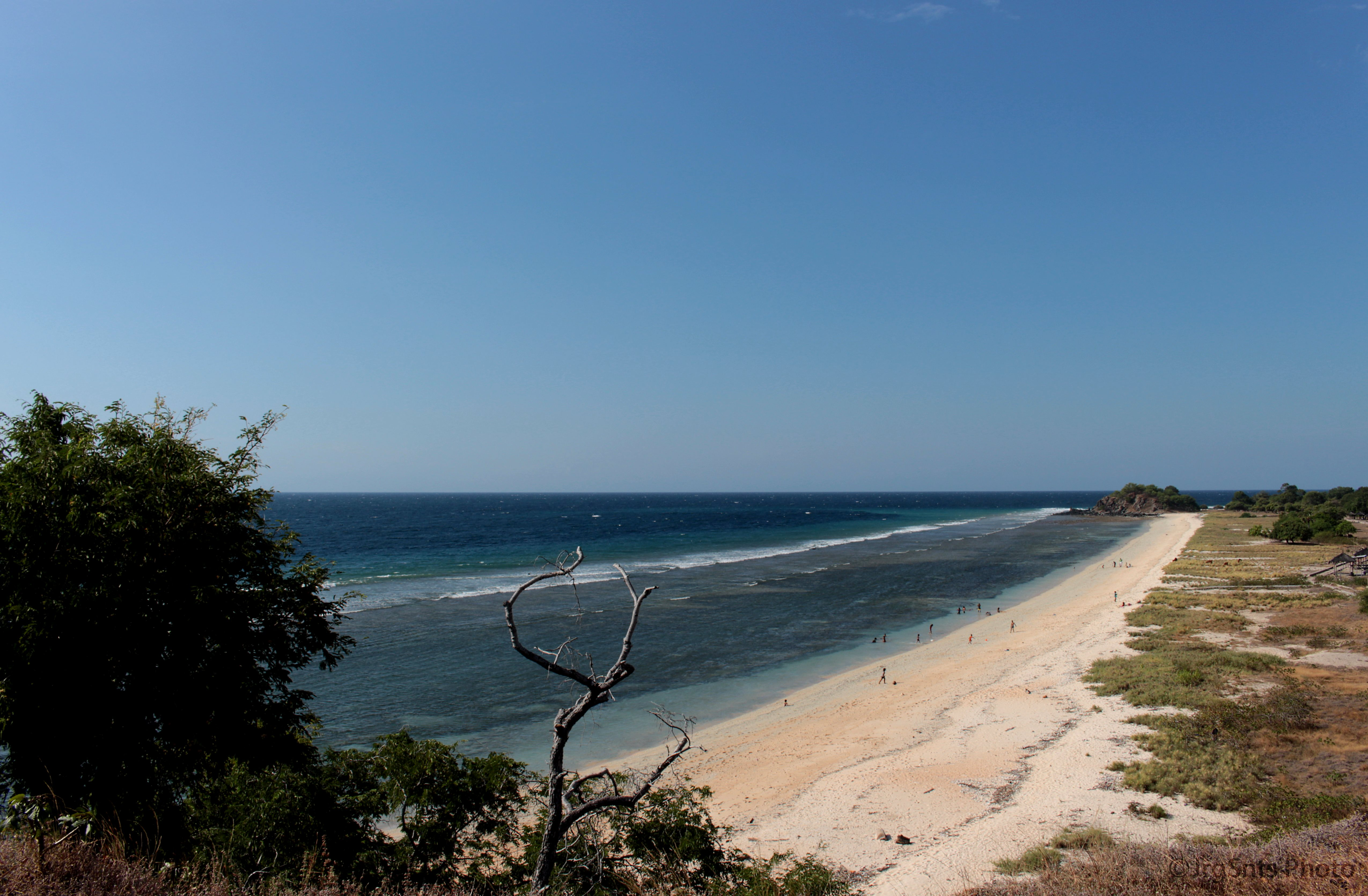
- View of the beach from the south west

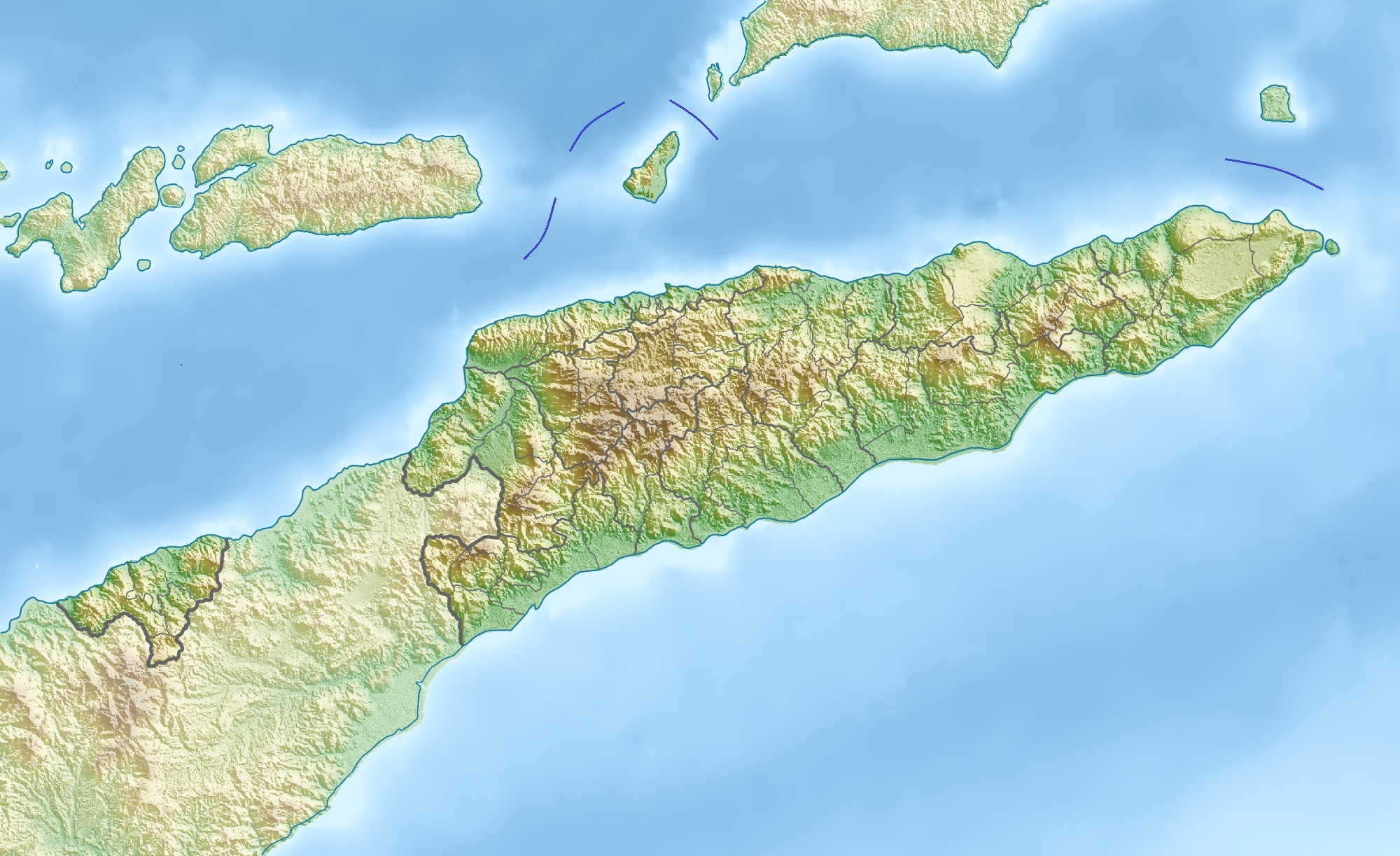
- Location within East Timor
- Location: Uma Caduac, Manatuto, Timor-Leste
- Nearest city: Dili
- Coordinates: 8°28′38″S 125°50′51″E

One Dollar Beach or Dollar Beach (Portuguese: Praia do Dólar, Tetun: Tasi-ibun Dolar) is a public beach on the north coast of Timor-Leste, east north east of Dili, the capital city. It is long, white, sandy and clean, and also frequently deserted, yet popular with beach users at other times.

== Etymology ==
The beach's name dates back only to about the start of this century, when Timor-Leste was a United Nations protectorate. At that time, local people would charge visitors US$1 for every car arriving and parking at the beach.

== Geography ==
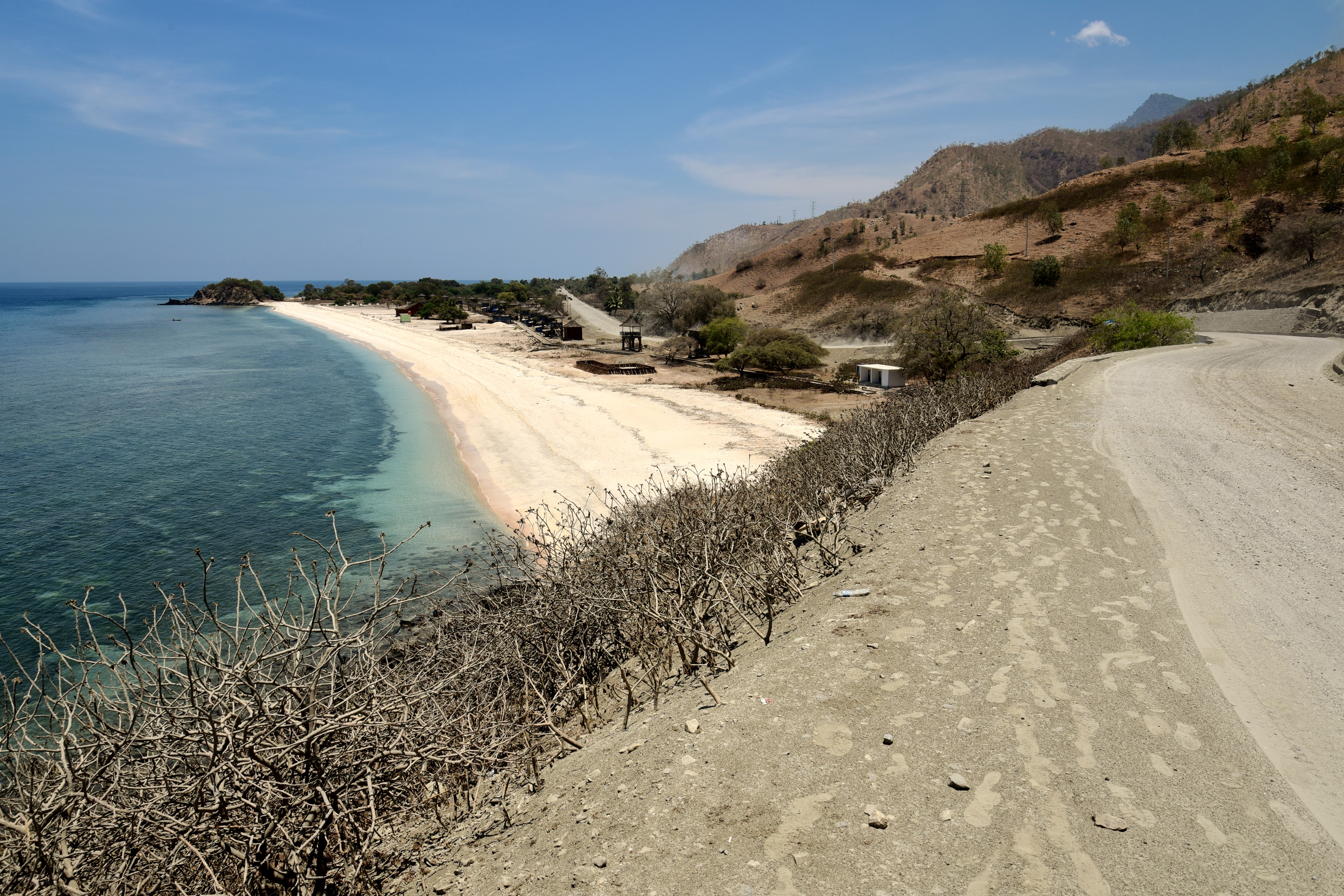
General view from the west

Long, spacious and frequently deserted, the beach is nevertheless popular at other times with families, including children, and also tourists and travellers. It is located in the suco of Uma Caduac, about 38 km (24 mi) or a 45 minute drive east north east of Dili.

The beach is composed of clean, soft snow-white sand sloping gently towards the water. It forms part of the south shore of Wetar Strait. The sea floor near the shore is sandy and the water is crystal-clear. Further out, there is a reef suitable for snorkelling and diving.

Often visible from the shore are pods of dolphins, and, in season, also whales. Underwater attractions at the reef include tropical fish and sea turtles.

The beach is part of the Subaun Important Bird Area (IBA), which is 23,665 ha (58,480 acres) in size. The IBA extends from sea level to the isolated peak of Mount Curi, and is mostly steep to moderately steep hills. Below about c. 400 m (1,300 ft) AMSL, its dominant vegetation is Eucalyptus alba savanna woodland, with a tall understorey of mostly Heteropogon and Themeda grasses.

== Facilities ==
There are few facilities at the beach other than a handful of restaurants or stalls, which offer inexpensive fish meals.

== See also ==
- Areia Branca Beach
- Cristo Rei Beach
- Jesus Backside Beach
- Valu Beach
