= Cristo Rei of Dili =

Statue of Jesus Christ in Dili, Timor-Leste

- Estátua do Cristo Rei de Díli (Portuguese); Estátua Cristo Rei Dili (Tetun)
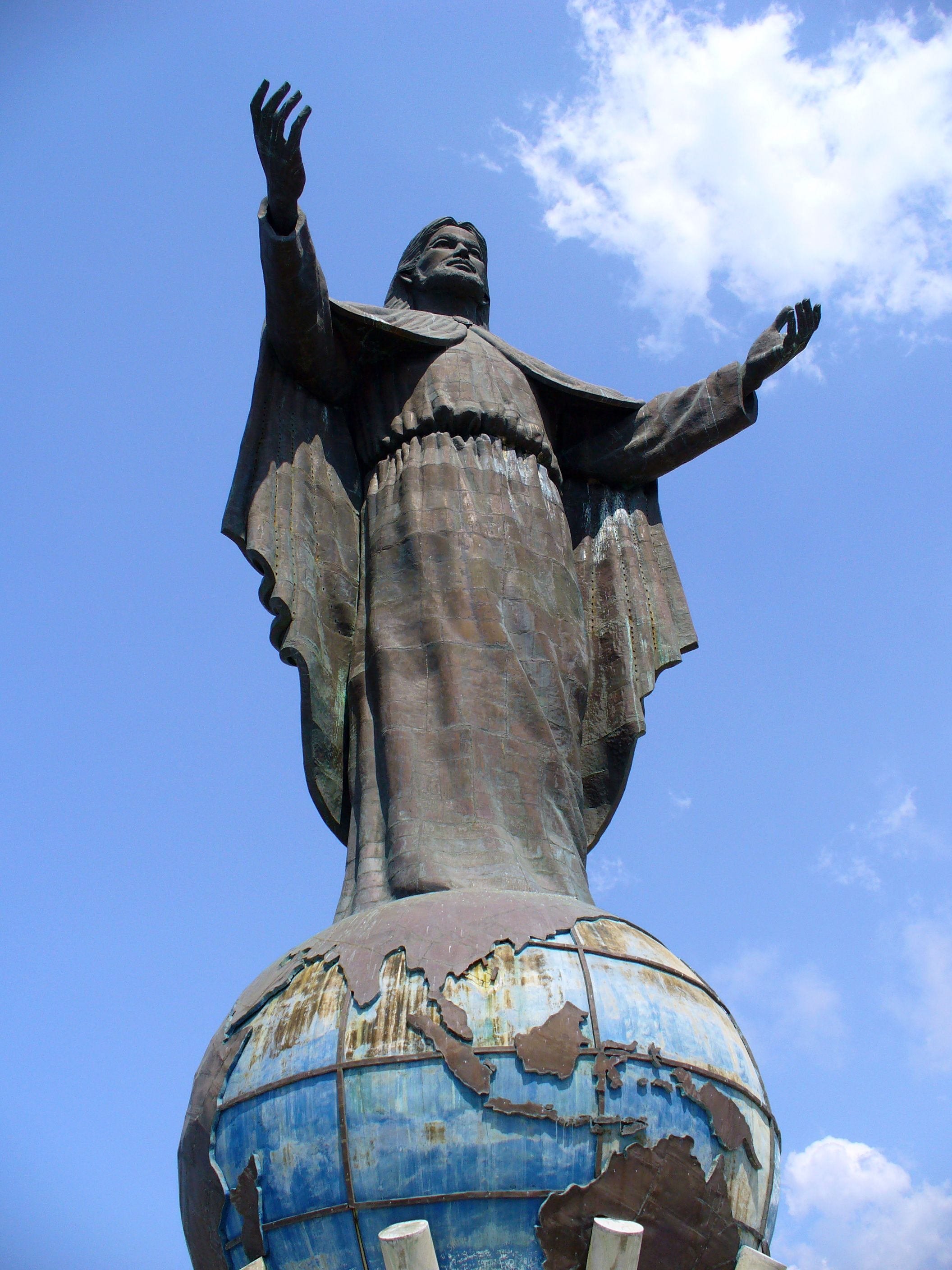
- The statue viewed from the peak of Cape Fatucama
- Location in Dili
- Location: Cape Fatucama, Dili, Timor-Leste
- Coordinates: 8°31′14″S 125°36′30″E
- Designer: Mochamad Syailillah
- Type: Statue
- Material: Copper
- Height: 27.0 metres (88.6 ft)
- Dedicated date: 15 October 1996
- Dedicated to: Christ the King

The Cristo Rei of Dili (Christ the King of Dili) statue (Portuguese: Estátua do Cristo Rei de Díli, Tetun: Estátua Cristo Rei Dili) is a 27.0-metre-high (88.6 ft) colossal statue of Jesus Christ situated atop a globe at Cape Fatucama in Dili, Timor-Leste. It is one of the country's main tourist attractions.

The statue was designed, and its construction supervised, by Mochamad Syailillah. It was officially unveiled by President Suharto of Indonesia in 1996 as a gift from the Indonesian Government to the people of Timor Timur, the then Indonesian province.

== Location ==
The statue, and the globe on which it rests, are mounted on the peak of Cape Fatucama at the end of the Fatucama peninsula. The statue is accessible from the car park at Cristo Rei Beach, on the south side of the cape, inside the Bay of Dili, via a 570-step concrete staircase shaded by trees.

From the base of the statue, there are panoramic views back over the bay towards Dili in the south west, out over the transition between Ombai and Wetar Straits to Atauro Island in the north, and down to Jesus Backside Beach facing Wetar Strait in the east.

== History ==
The idea of constructing the Cristo Rei statue was proposed by José Abílio Osório Soares, then the Governor of East Timor, to President Suharto. The statue was intended as a gift to East Timor for the 20th anniversary of its integration into Indonesia; the anniversary was due to take place on 17 July 1996.

Suharto put national airline Garuda Indonesia in charge of leading the project. Garuda was given the responsibility to find capital for funding the project, and raised 1.1 billion rupiah (US$123,000). However, that was not sufficient to erect the statue, and contributions from East Timorese civil servants and businessmen were needed to complete the project, which eventually cost more than 5 billion rupiah (US$559,000).

Meanwhile, Garuda engaged Mochamad Syailillah, to design and build the statue. Syailillah whose workspace was in Bandung, had never previously constructed a large statue. He travelled to East Timor to inspect Cape Fatucama, which the Governor had nominated as the proposed site. The terrain at the Cape was of suitable strength for the erection of a large and tall statue.

Taking that terrain and calculations of the very strong local winds into account, Syailillah designed the statue and made a prototype of it. The design portrayed the subject wrapped in a robe. The face of the statue proved to be difficult to render; after much effort, including consultation with the Communion of Churches in Indonesia headquarters in Jakarta, the artist gravitated towards Greek and Roman facial features, and aimed at simplicity.

Almost a year of work was required to create the statue's body, which was fabricated by 30 workers in Sukaraja, Bandung, to the completed design. The body was made of 27 separate copper sections, which were then loaded onto three container trailers and shipped to Dili aboard a chartered ship. Installation of the statue by the team from Bandung, including the globe and a 10 m-high (33 ft) cross, took about three months. A bamboo frame was installed at the site to facilitate the lifting of the copper sections, each of which weighed 100–200 kg (220–440 lb), up to the 100 m-high (330 ft) peak.

Prior to the unveiling of the statue, East Timorese resistance leader Xanana Gusmão, who was then being held in prison in Jakarta, was scathingly critical of it:

"This is Jakarta's propaganda to deceive its own people and the international community. Suharto, both at court and elsewhere, was a political leader. What [Roman Catholic] Bishop [Carlos Filipe Ximenes] Belo disapproved of was political interference with the church. I don't know if the Bishop will be at the event. Hopefully not. Because this could mean that the Dili church is under Jakarta, even though it is directly under the Vatican."

The statue was unveiled on 15 October 1996. Bishop Belo, together with President Suharto and Governor Soares, used a helicopter to witness its revelation directly from the air. A few days earlier, the Norwegian Nobel Committee had embarrassed the Indonesian government by awarding the Nobel Peace Prize for 1996 to Bishop Belo and José Ramos-Horta "... to honour their sustained and self-sacrificing contributions for a small but oppressed people." In his own public comments on the statue, Bishop Belo said:

"What's the point of building a statue to Jesus if people are not going to be treated according to the gospel? It would be better to improve the situation rather than build statues."

Before East Timor ceased to be a province of Indonesia, the statue was given an award by the Indonesian World Records Museum for being the tallest statue in the country. Since East Timor regained independence as Timor-Leste in 2002, the statue has been not destroyed, but, instead, preserved and re-presented as a tourist attraction.

Timorese argue that the statue now 'belongs' to Timor-Leste, regardless of its originators and their purposes. It is the source of considerable native pride, and, as "... an iconic symbol of the country and its Capital City of Dili ...", is now a haunt of locals as well as being one of Timor-Leste's main tourist attractions. Even Gusmão has changed his position; while he was serving as Prime Minister of Timor-Leste between 2007 and 2015, his government supported the renovation of the statue.

Roger Mitton, a former senior correspondent of the defunct Hong Kong-based magazine Asiaweek, and Washington and Hanoi bureau chief for The Straits Times of Singapore. Mitton was complimentary about his visit to the Cristo Rei site, opining that "... it's ... nice to climb up to the statue at dusk and take in the gorgeous view of Dili and the bay and surrounding mountains."

== Symbolism ==
The monument (statue, globe and pedestal) is 27.0 m (88.6 ft) high, to reflect the now former integration of East Timor as the 27th province of Indonesia. The statue and globe are 34 m (112 ft) high, two times 17, an allusion to 17 July 1976, the day East Timor was integrated into Indonesia, and 17 August 1945, the day Indonesia proclaimed independence from the Netherlands.

The statue is now also seen as a physical symbol of the figure of Christ, of suffering, and of the Catholic faith that is now part of being East Timorese. It is gesturing with embracing arms, and is oriented towards the west, which, as some have observed, is the direction of Jakarta. However, the artist has said that the Governor had asked that the statue face towards Dili. The arms and hands of the statue are held in place with steel wire rope, to withstand the wind pressure; there is also a wind vent in the armpit of the statue's robe, linked by a pipe to another vent at the back of the robe.

Visitors climbing the staircase from Cristo Rei Beach to the statue pass 14 stations, which are places of prayer for Catholics. The 14 stations symbolise the Stations of the Cross passed by Jesus Christ on his walk to Calvary or Golgotha on the day of his crucifixion.

== Gallery ==
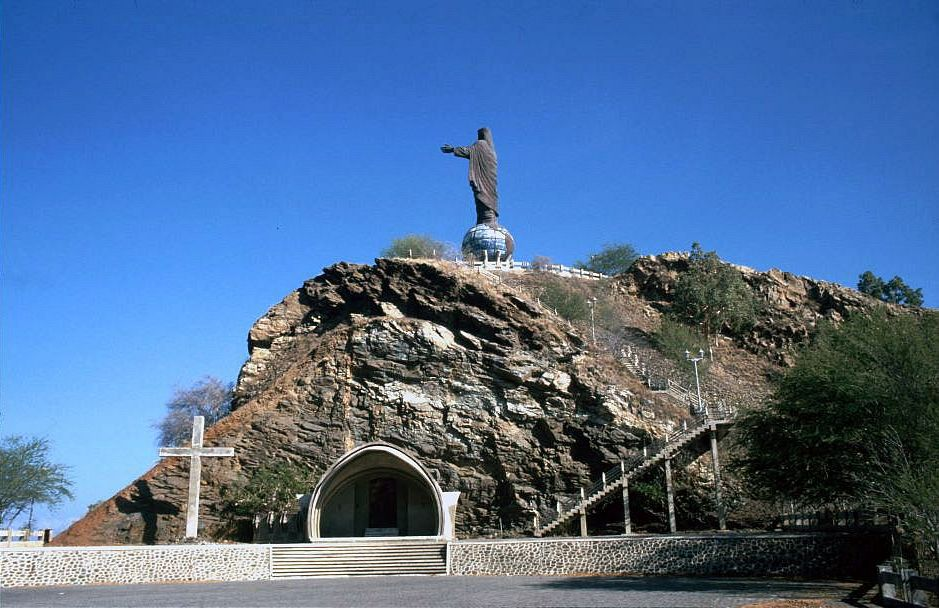
Chapel under the statue

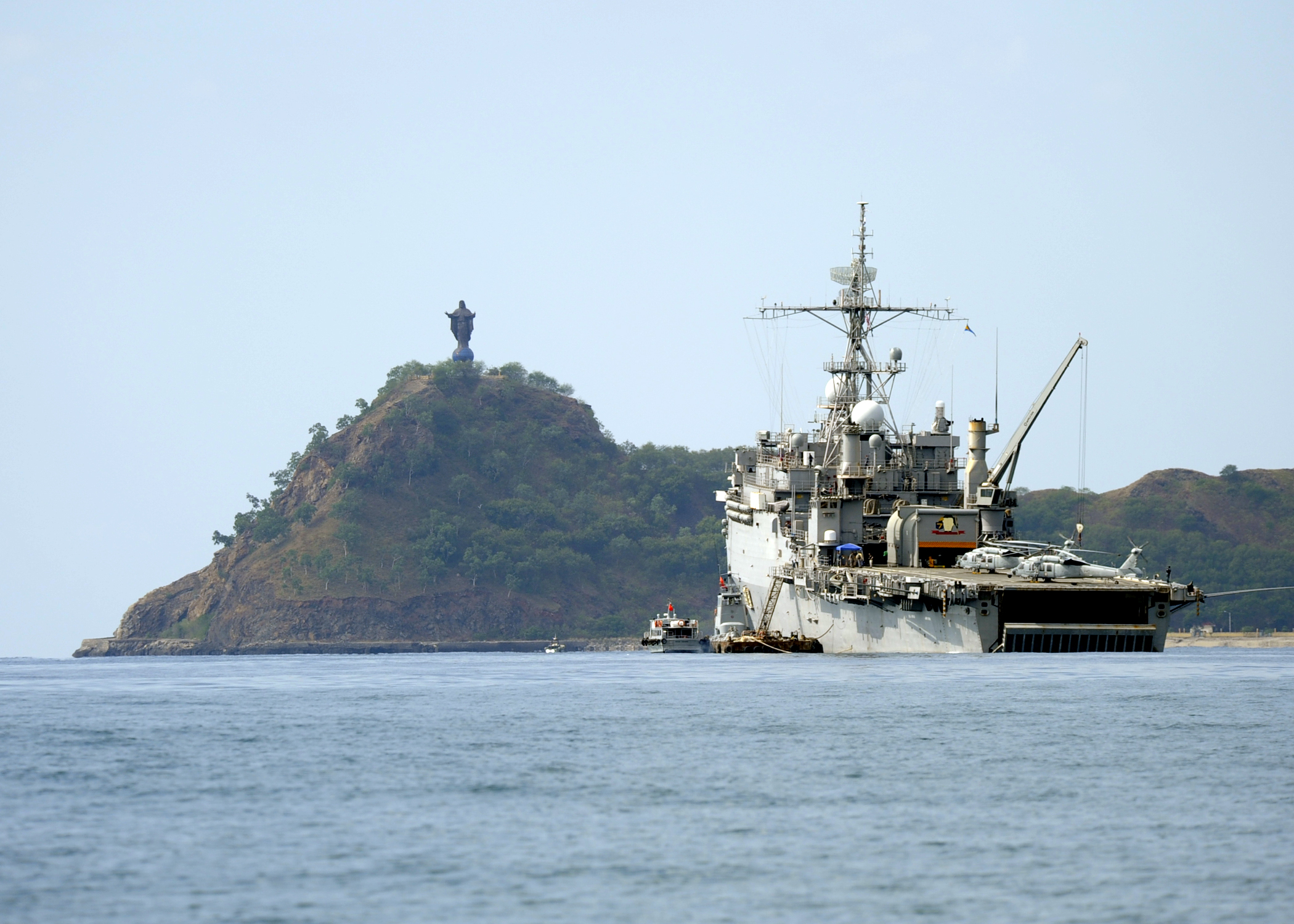
View of the statue from the Bay of Dili

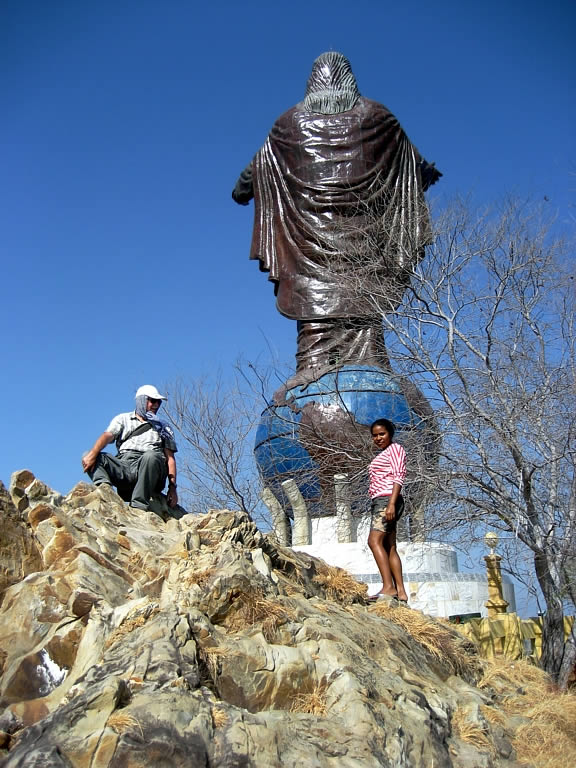
View from behind

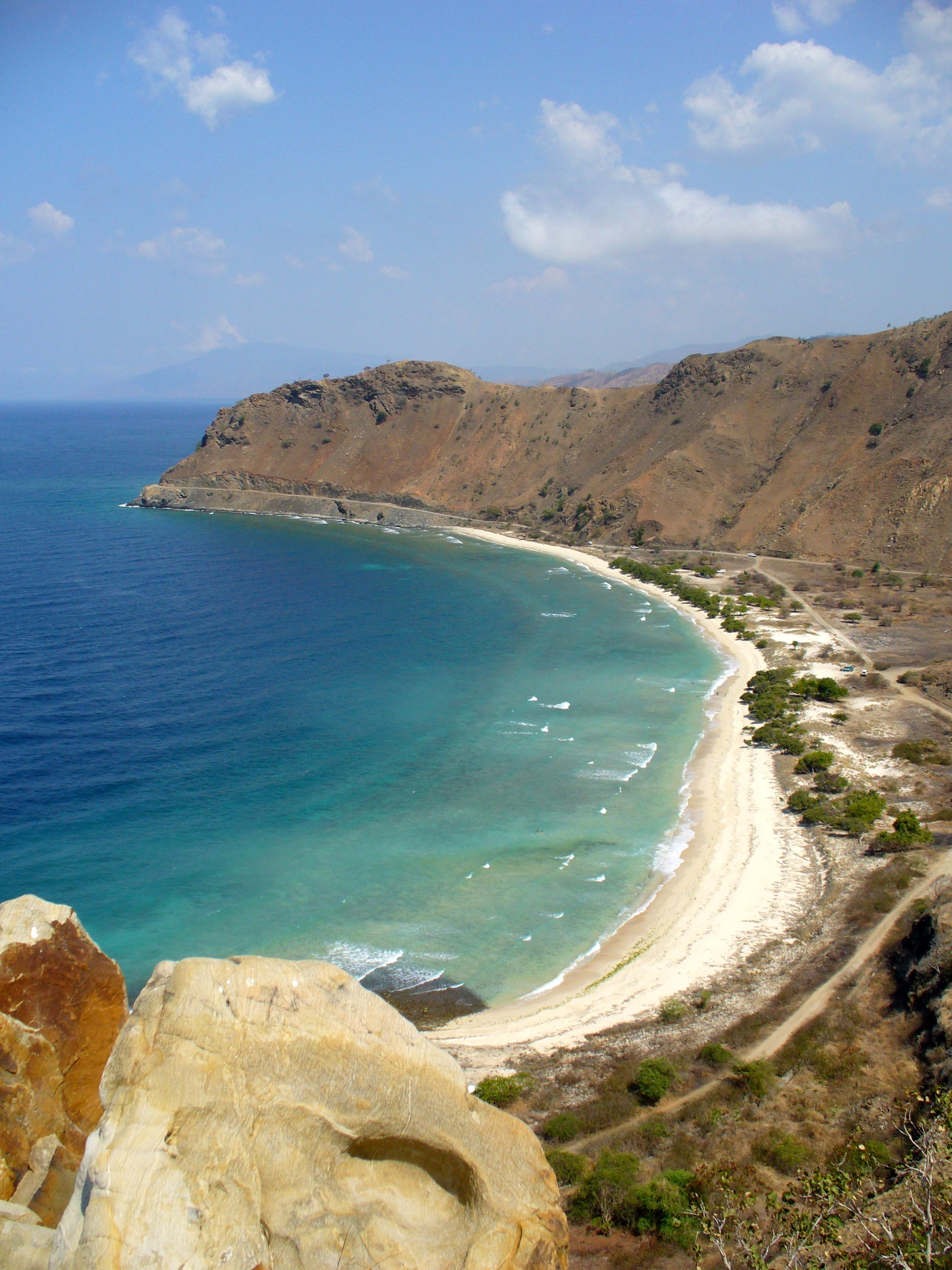
Dolok Oan Beach as seen from the statue

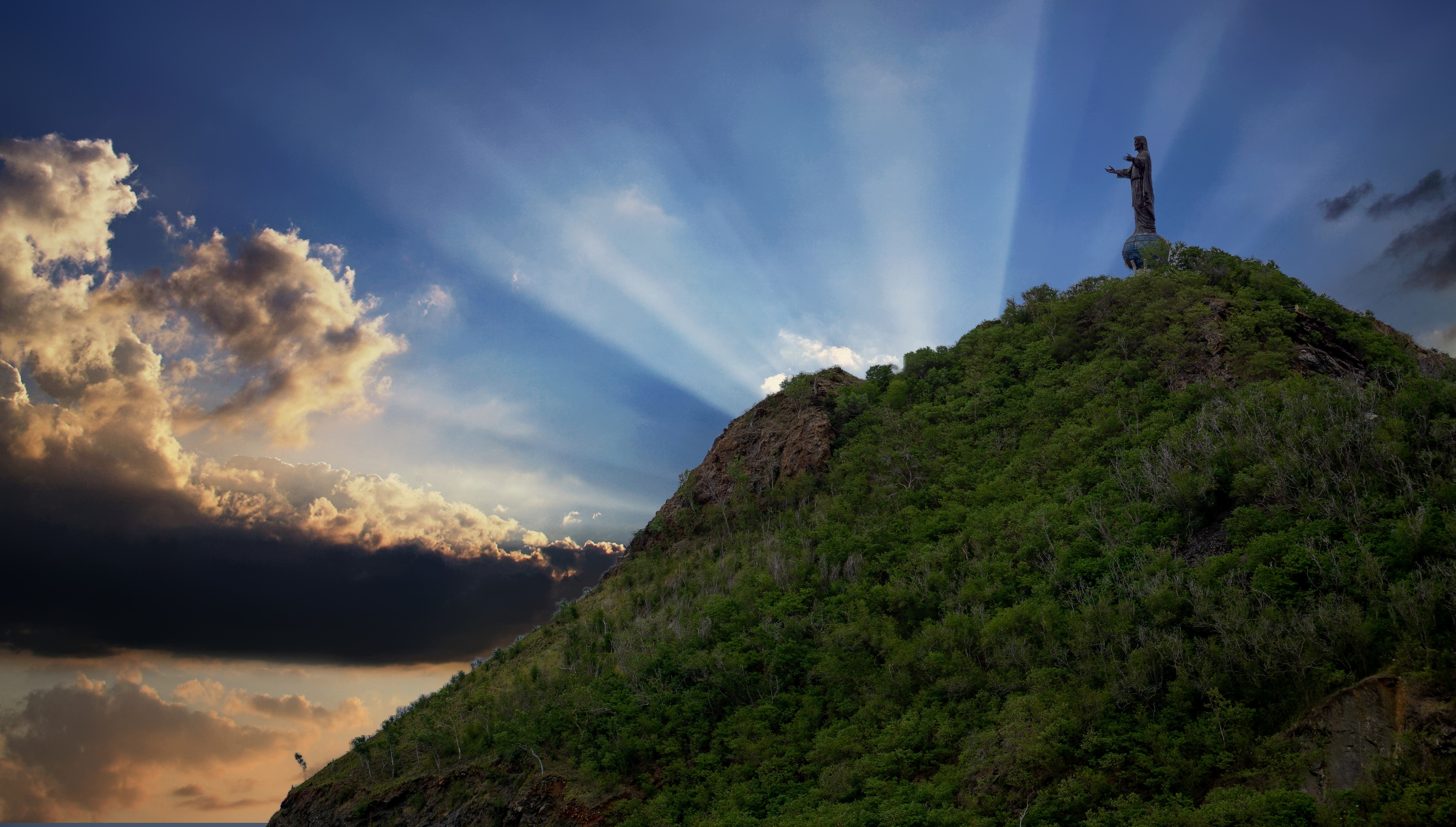
Cristo Rei at sunrise

== See also ==
- List of statues of Jesus
- List of tallest statues
