= Bay of Dili =

Bay in Timor-Leste

- Baía de Díli (Portuguese); Baía Dili (Tetum)
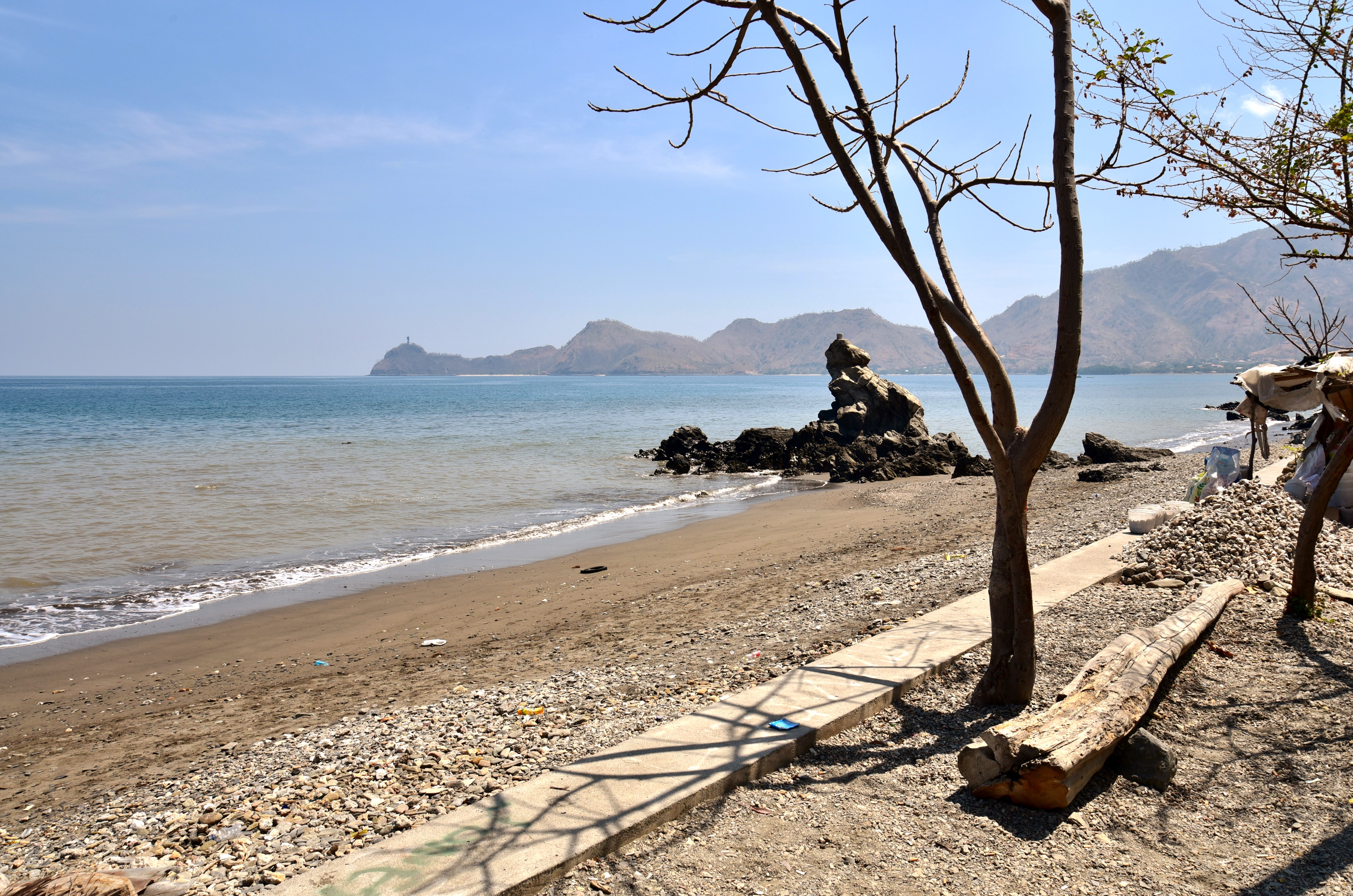
- View north east towards Cape Fatucama, which resembles a crocodile's nose

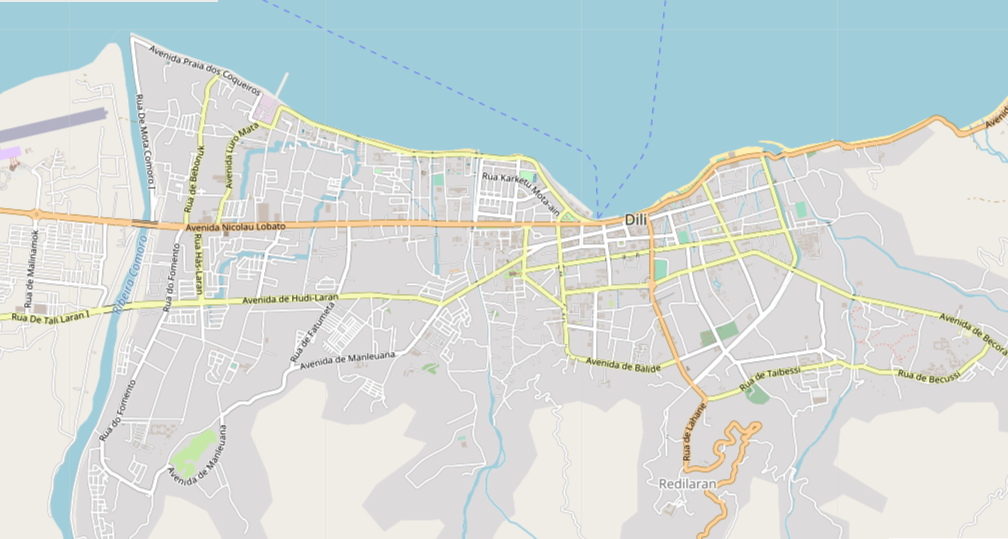
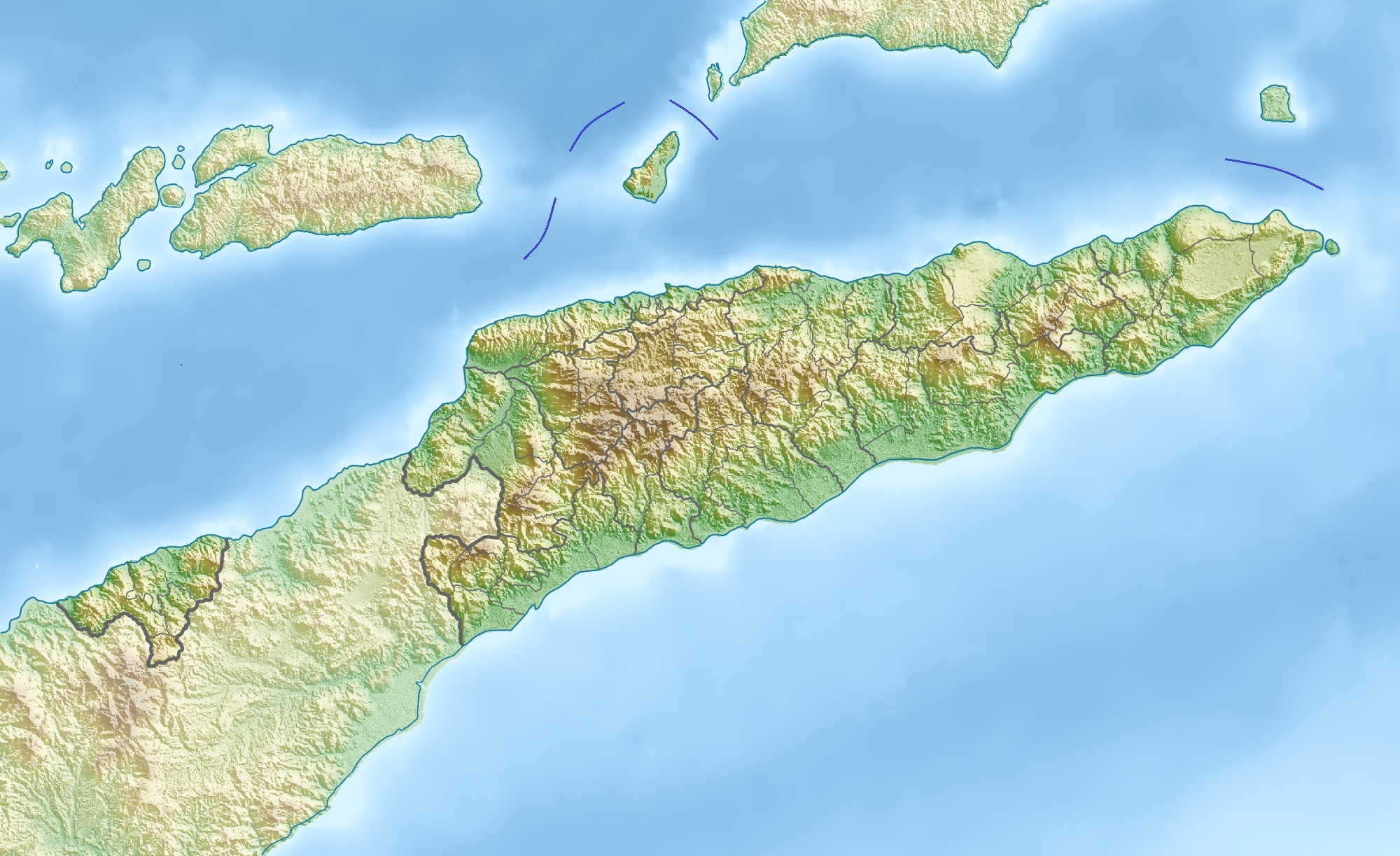
- Location in Dili Location in East Timor
- Location: Dili, Dili municipality, Timor-Leste
- Coordinates: 8°32′57″S 125°34′31″E
- Type: Bay
- Part of: Ombai Strait; (part of Banda Sea)
- River sources: Comoro River; Bidau River; Claran River

The Bay of Dili (Portuguese: Baía de Díli, Tetum: Baía Dili) is a bay on the north coast of Timor-Leste adjacent to Dili, its capital city. The bay forms part of Ombai Strait, which separates the Alor Archipelago from the islands of Wetar, Atauro, and Timor in the Lesser Sunda Islands.

== Geography ==
The bay is located on the southern side of Ombai Strait, immediately to the north of the similarly named Dili municipality. It extends from the mouth of the Comoro River in the west to Cristo Rei Beach, Cape Fatucama, and the Cristo Rei of Dili statue in the north east.

== History ==
Early records about Timor, especially before the 1700s, are sparse. Portuguese settlers are said to have arrived in the Bay of Dili in 1520, and to have established a small settlement there.

A quarter of a millennium later, in 1769, the governor of Portuguese Timor sought to break the influence of powerful local families in Lifau, Oecusse, his then residence, by moving the colonial administration and 1,200 people to the shore of the bay, at the site of what would become Dili, the colonial capital.

The bay's location at the centre of Timor's north coast, and its natural features, were favourable for the establishment of such a capital. Its waters were calm, and the combination of Capes Fatucama and Tibar, and the offshore island of Atauro, provided shelter for ships at anchor. Although the terrain on the bay's shores was swampy and unhealthy, there was also arable land that could be used for the cultivation of cereals, and a supply of drinking water.

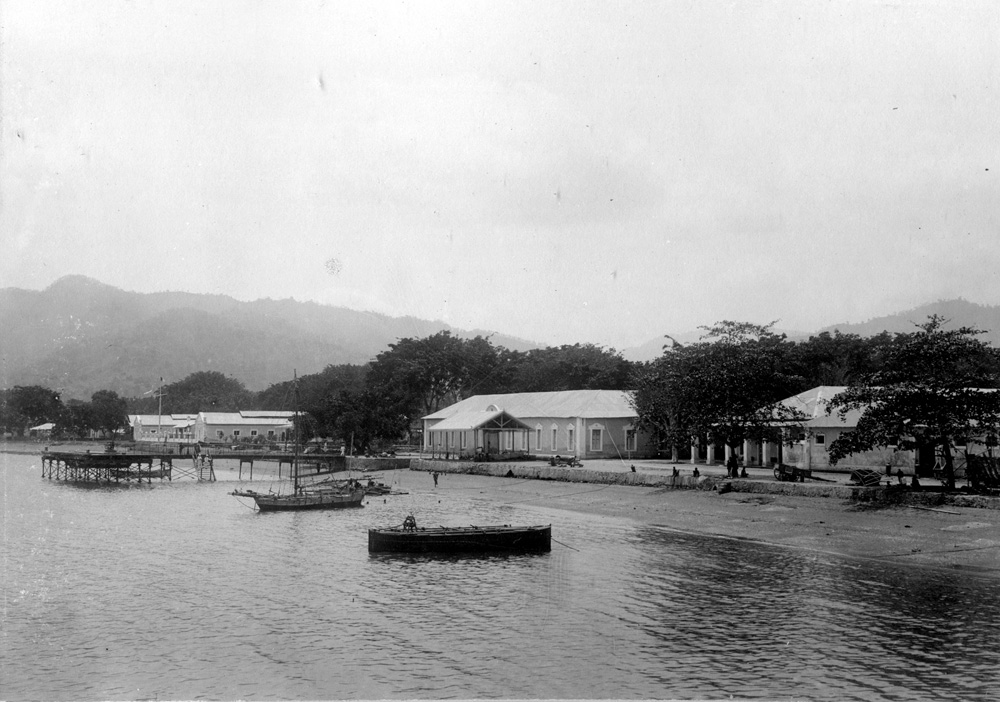
The Dili waterfront, c. 1901

For many decades, Dili evolved only slowly. At the turn of the twentieth century, there was significant development of the city, under the governorship of José Celestino da Silva (1894–1908). However, most of the buildings constructed at that time were destroyed during World War II.

In the 1950s, Dili was reconstructed, according to a plan that included the siting of residential nuclei along the two-lane, one-way street now known as Avenida Marginal, on the shore of the bay. With its lining of substantial, mature trees, and its broad pathway for pedestrians, the Avenida became the capital's favourite public promenade.

On 7 December 1975, Indonesian troops landed in Dili. The following day, after capturing the city, Indonesian soldiers led groups of civilians, including members of Fretilin and others, from various locations to the Dili wharf, and shot them. The total number of people executed on the Dili waterfront that day is estimated at 150. Some of the bodies of those who had been shot on the Dili wharf were later washed ashore at Areia Branca Beach on the eastern side of the bay; other people were taken to that beach, executed, and dumped into the water.

== Economy ==
=== Fishing ===
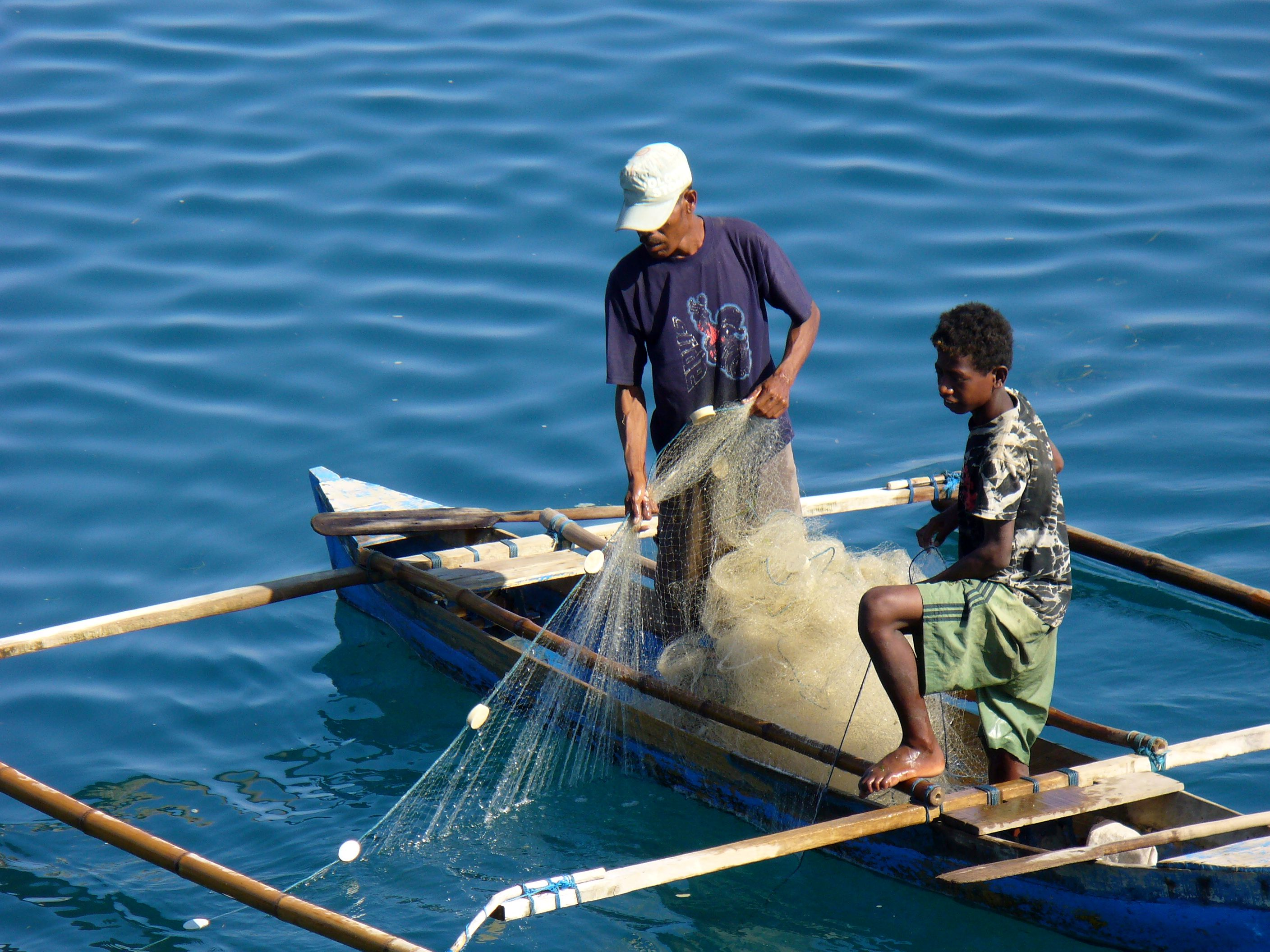
Net fishing in the bay, c. 2006

The fishing industry in Timor-Leste is not well-developed. The country has abundant fish stocks, but almost all of its fishing is subsistence or semi-subsistence. The fisheries sector, both in the Bay of Dili and nationally, is dominated by small-scale coastal fisheries, and most of the capture fishing in coastal areas is carried out in nearshore waters. There is no locally owned and operated commercial fishing fleet.

The Food and Agriculture Organization of the United Nations (FAO) has said that reliable data on Timor-Leste's fishery resources are scant. According to the final report of a 2011 project by the Japan International Cooperation Agency (JICA) aimed at promoting agribusiness in East Timor, the then Dili District (now the Dili municipality), which then included, but no longer includes, Atauro (outside the Bay of Dili), was responsible for around 40% of the country's fish production.

The FAO's Fishery and Aquaculture Country Profile for Timor-Leste, prepared in May 2019, estimated that the total fish production in 2007 and 2008 in the then Dili District was 1,035,000 kg (2,282,000 lb) and 1,170,900 kg (2,581,400 lb), respectively. However, neither the report nor the Country Profile identified how much of that production was derived from the capture of fish in the Bay of Dili.

During the Indonesian occupation of East Timor, the Indonesian Government set up 151 fishing centres nationwide, including 13 on the Dili mainland and 18 on Atauro. Those centres still exist, and serve as the main sites for the landing of captured fish. They are also used for the sale and marketing of fish, and are intended to serve as local foci for fisheries management.

=== Port of Dili ===
The Port of Dili is located at the southern extremity of the bay, and also at the north western edge of the Dili city centre. Until 30 September 2022, it was the main and only international port of entry to Timor-Leste; since then, its facilities have been open only to domestic passenger ships and cruise ships carrying international tourists.

== See also ==
- Tasitolu
- Tibar Bay
