= Cristo Rei Administrative Post =

Administrative post in Dili Municipality, East Timor

Cristo Rei
- Administrative Post
- Posto Administrativo de Cristo Rei (Portuguese); Postu Administrativu Kristu Rei (Tetum)
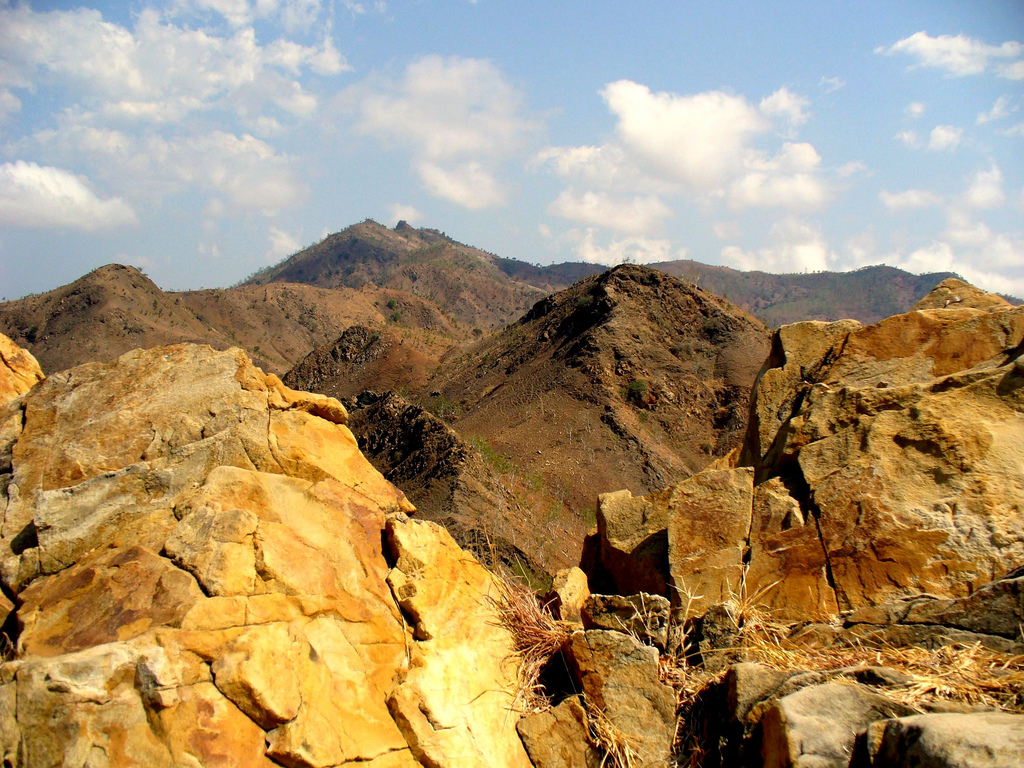
- View of Cape Fatucama

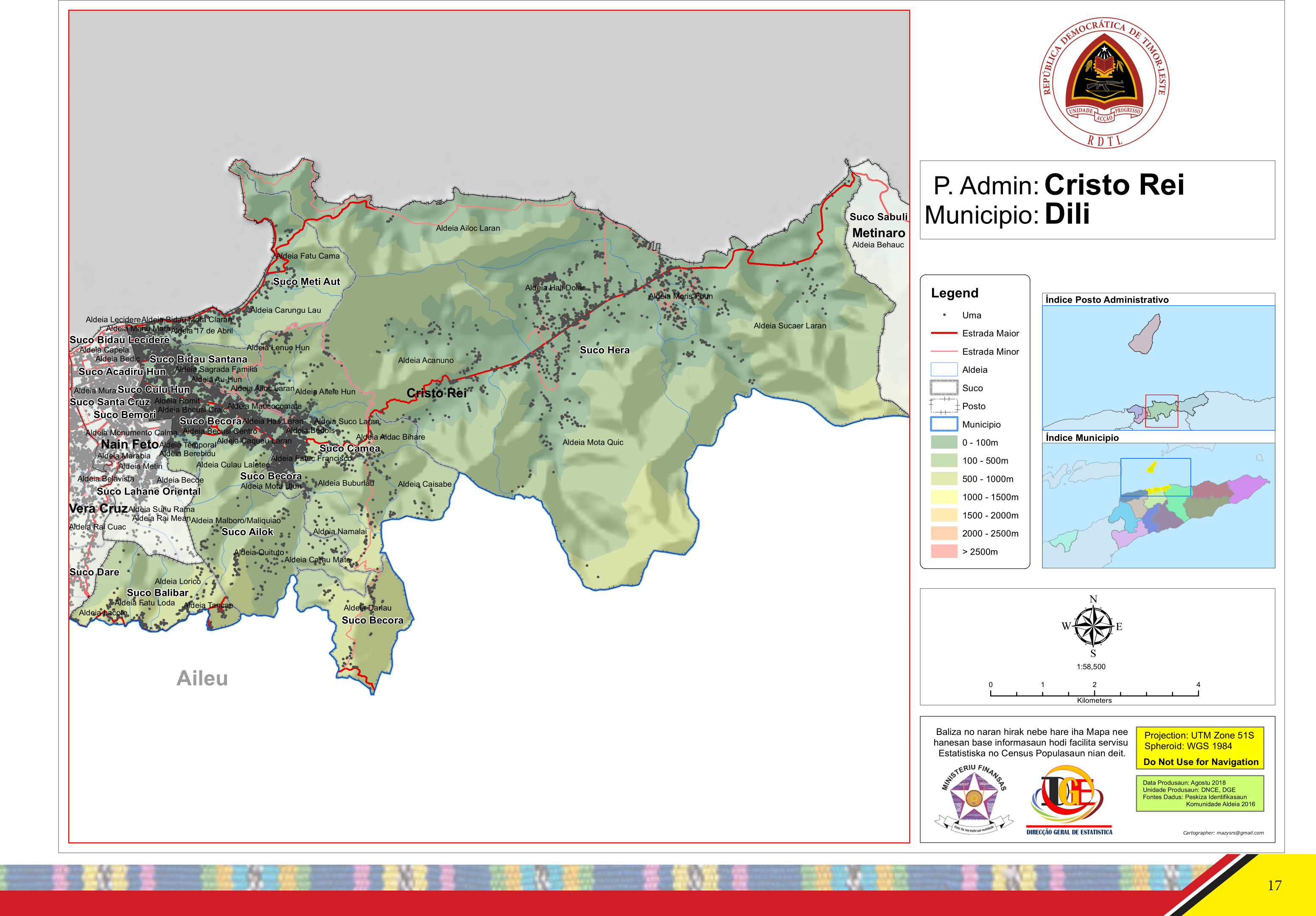
- Official map

- Location within East Timor
- Coordinates: 8°32′S 125°41′E
- Country: Timor-Leste
- Municipality: Dili
- Seat: Becora
- Sucos: Ailok; Balibar; Becora; Bidau Santana; Camea; Culu Hun; Hera; Meti Aut

Area
  - Total: 80.6 km^{2} (31.1 sq mi)

Population (2015 census)
  - Total: 62,848
  - Density: 780/km^{2} (2,020/sq mi)

Households (2015 census)
  - Total: 8,878
- Time zone: UTC+09:00 (TLT)

Cristo Rei Administrative Post (Portuguese: Posto Administrativo de Cristo Rei, Tetum: Postu Administrativu Kristu Rei), is an administrative post (formerly subdistrict) in Dili Municipality, Timor-Leste. Its seat or administrative centre is Becora, and its population at the 2010 census was 54,936.

== Education ==
Secondary schools in Cristo Rei Administrative Post include Escola Secundária Geral 5 de Maio, Escola Secundária Geral 12 de Novembro, Escola Secundária Geral Herois da Pátria, Escola Secundária Técnica-Vocacional – Escola Economia e Comércio, and Escola Católica do Sagrado Coração de Jesus.
