= Areia Branca no Dolok Oan =

Nature reserve in Timor-Leste

Coordinates: 08°31′S 125°36′E

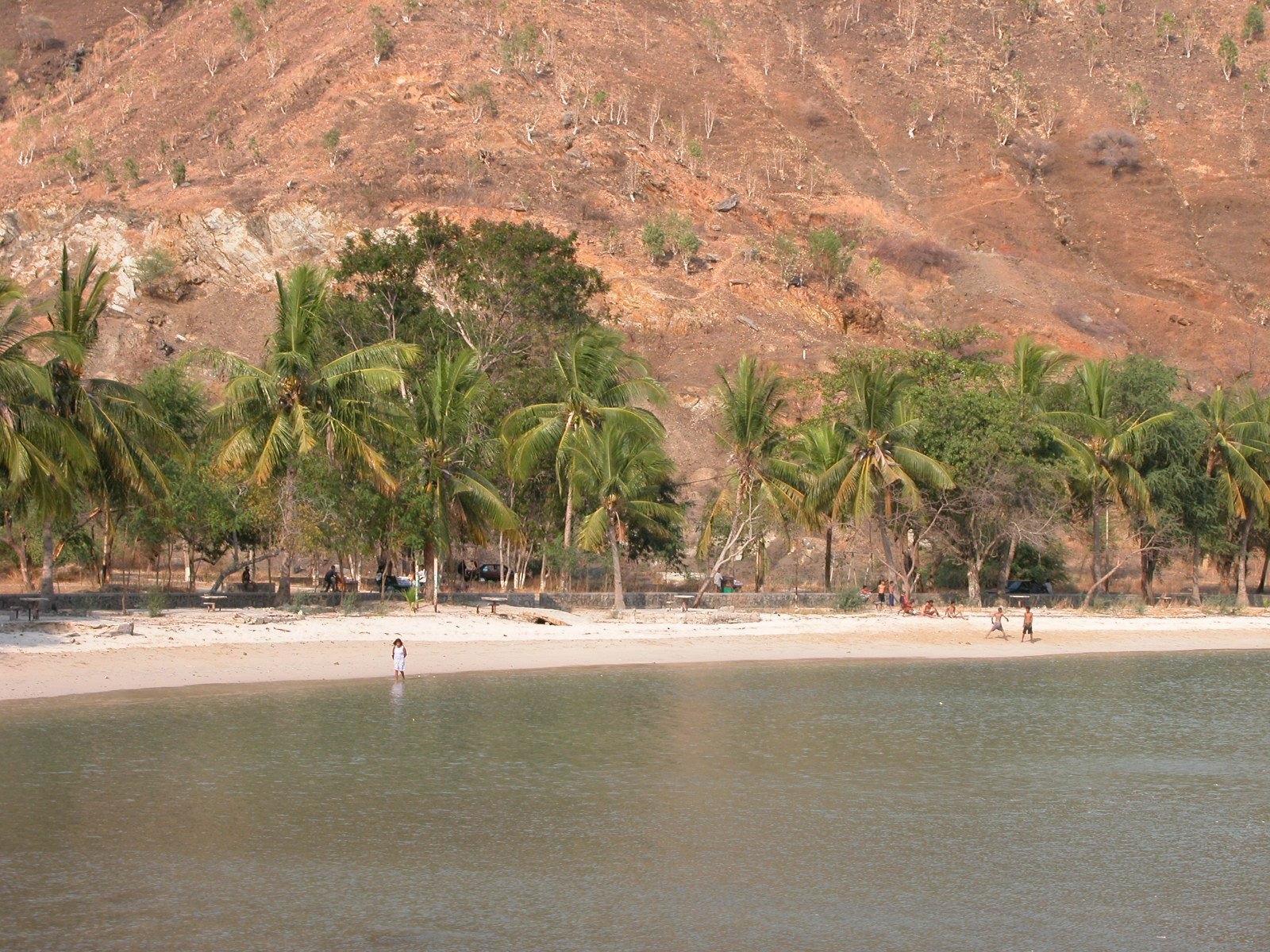
Areia Branca beach

Areia Branca no Dolok Oan is a 2,916 ha (7,210 acres) Important Bird Area (IBA) in Timor-Leste, a country occupying the eastern end of the island of Timor at the eastern end of the Lesser Sunda Islands group of Wallacea.

== Description ==
The IBA lies just east of the capital, Dili, on the north coast of the island. It encompasses a marine embayment containing beds of sea-grass, mangroves, mudflats, rock platforms and beaches. The coastal wetland habitats are backed by hills and ridges vegetated with savanna woodland dominated by Eucalyptus alba, with patches of tropical dry forest.

=== Birds ===
The site has been identified by BirdLife International as an IBA because it supports visiting, though non-breeding, critically endangered Christmas Island frigatebirds, as well as populations of pink-headed imperial pigeons, streak-breasted honeyeaters, Timor friarbirds, plain gerygones, fawn-breasted whistlers, olive-brown orioles, blue-cheeked flowerpeckers, flame-breasted sunbirds and Timor sparrows.

== See also ==
- List of Important Bird Areas in Timor-Leste
