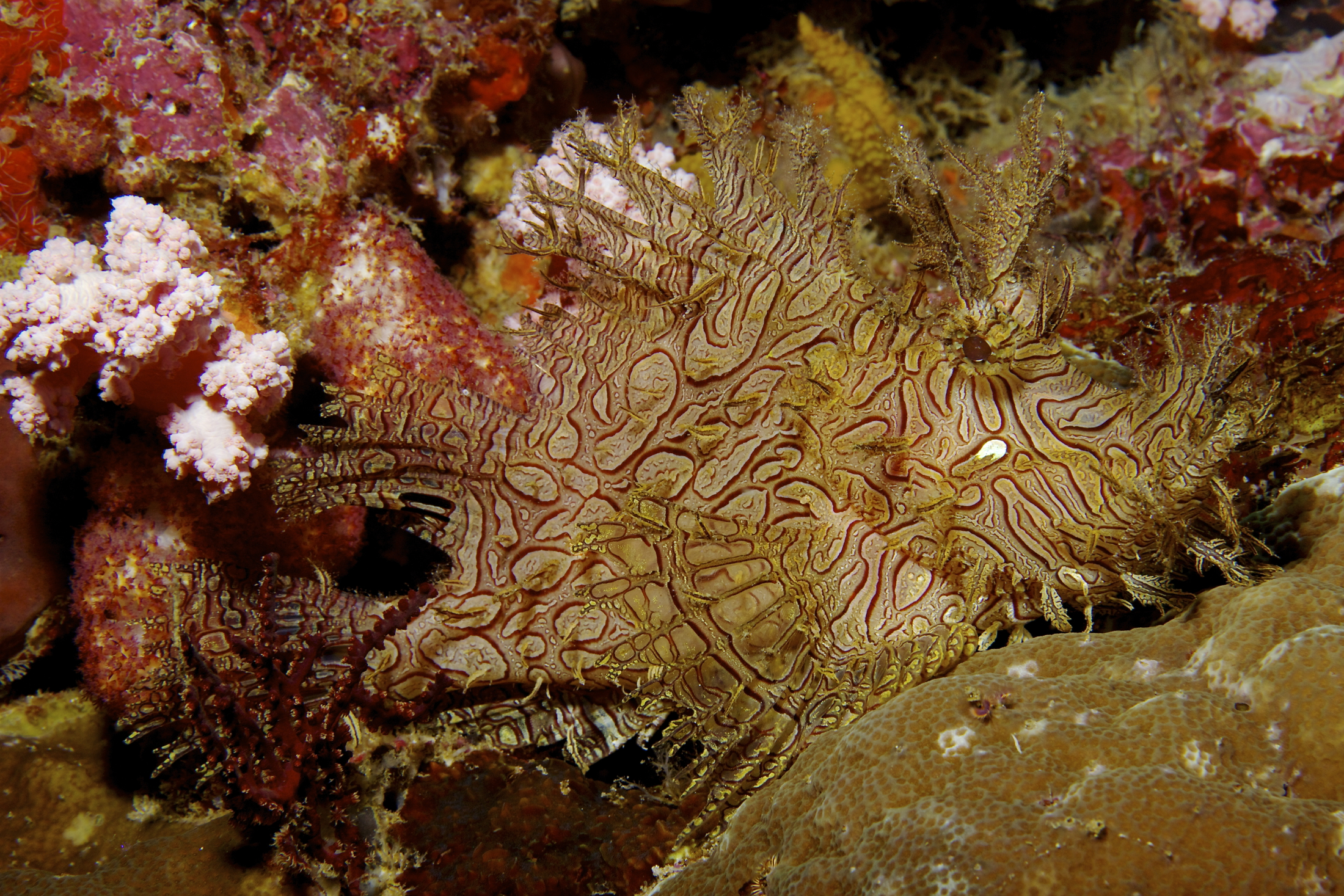

Conservation status
- Least Concern (IUCN 3.1)

Scientific classification
- Kingdom: Animalia
- Phylum: Chordata
- Class: Actinopterygii
- Order: Perciformes
- Family: Scorpaenidae
- Genus: Rhinopias
- Species: R. aphanes

Binomial name
- Rhinopias aphanes Eschmeyer, 1973

= Rhinopias aphanes =

Species of fish

Rhinopias aphanes, the lacy scorpionfish, weedy scorpionfish or Merlet's scorpionfish, is a species of marine ray-finned fish belonging to the family Scorpaenidae, the scorpionfishes. This species is found in the Western Pacific. It occasionally makes its way into the aquarium trade.

== Taxonomy ==
Rhinopias aphanes was first formally described in 1973 by the American ichthyologist William N. Eschmeyer with the type locality given as New Caledonia. The specific name aphanes means "that which is unseen or inconspicuous", an allusion to the camouflage created by its notable coloration and flaps of skin.

== Description ==
Rhinopias aphanes has two black spots in the middle of the membrane between the sixth and eighth rays of the dorsal fin, while R. argoliba, R. cea and R. xenops all lack them. Therefore, this feature allows us to distinguish this species from its relatives; other differences include the lack of scales on the operculum between the tips of the upper and lower opercular spines and the opercular margin (the other three species all have such scales), and it having only 16 or 17 pectoral-fin rays (this number is 18 in the other three species). It can be distinguished from the other two species in the genus - namely R. eschmeyeri and R. frondosa - by noticing its non-fleshy membranes on the spiny part of the dorsal fin (fleshy for the other two species) and clearly notched (as opposed to unnotched or weakly notched) margins of the soft-rayed portions of all but its pectoral fins. Additionally,

1. In this species, the tips of each caudal fin ray have two branches in adults (none in juveniles), while in the other two species there are four.
2. The dorsal fin spines are rigid with strongly pointed tips; in R. eschmeyeri and R. frondosa the fins are relatively soft, with easily bended tips.
3. The lateral lacrimal spine is pointed; in the other two species it may be absent or vestigial.
4. The suborbital ridge typically has three pointed spines instead of three bumps.

This species has 12–18 tentacles underneath the lower jaw, 2-4 tentacles below the eyes and many tentacles on the flanks above the lateral line. There are also clearly branched, long tentacles on the supraocular and rear lacrimal spines. This species can grow to a total length of 25 centimetres (9.8 in).

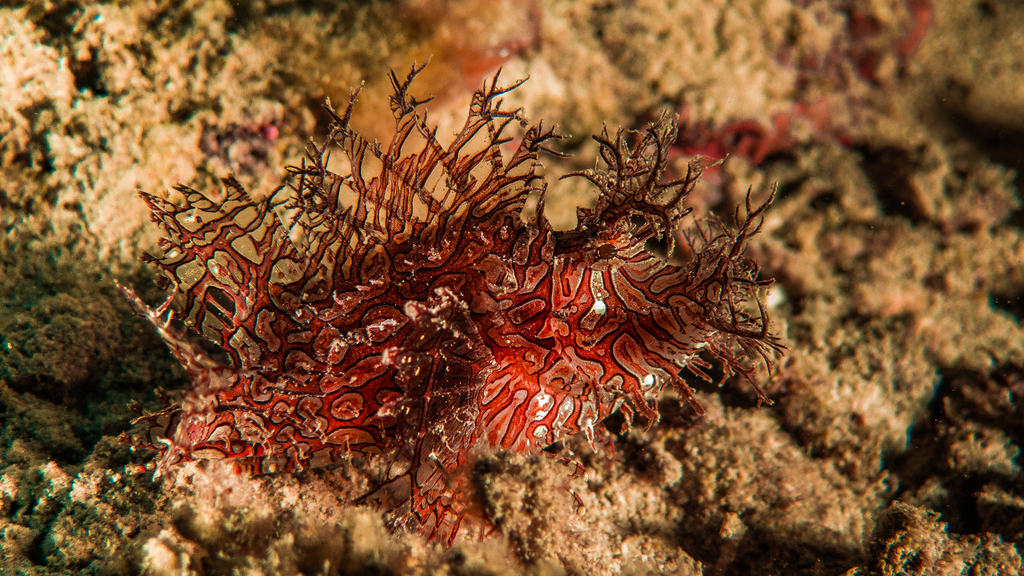
On the Great Barrier Reef, Queensland

== Distribution and habitat ==
Rhinopias aphanes occurs in the western Pacific where it has been recorded from Queensland, Papua New Guinea, New Caledonia, and Vanuatu. It is found at depths between 5 and 30 m (16 and 98 ft). This is a rare species found on coral slope and soft substrates. It is a benthic fish, which rests on the seabed.

== Biology ==
Rhinopias aphanes is very reluctant to leave the seafloor, and normally just lies on the bottom and rocks gently back and forth and from side to side. Rather than swimming, this species moves around by "walking" and "hopping", which are powered by the pelvic and pectoral fins. It expels water through branchial tubes above the operculum, making the tentacles present on the first few soft rays of the dorsal fin quiver; since this bears resemblance to the swaying movements of algae or benthic invertebrates in the current, it improves the camouflage of this fish and thus its chances of ambushing smaller fish (which is the most typical prey). Rhinopias aphanes is more active during the night.

== Utilisation ==
Rhinopias aphanes is a much sought after fish in the aquarium trade.

== See also ==
- List of marine aquarium fish species
