= Ombai Strait =

Strait in Southeast Asia

- Selat Ombai (Indonesian); Estreito de Ombai (Portuguese); Estreitu Ombai (Tetum)
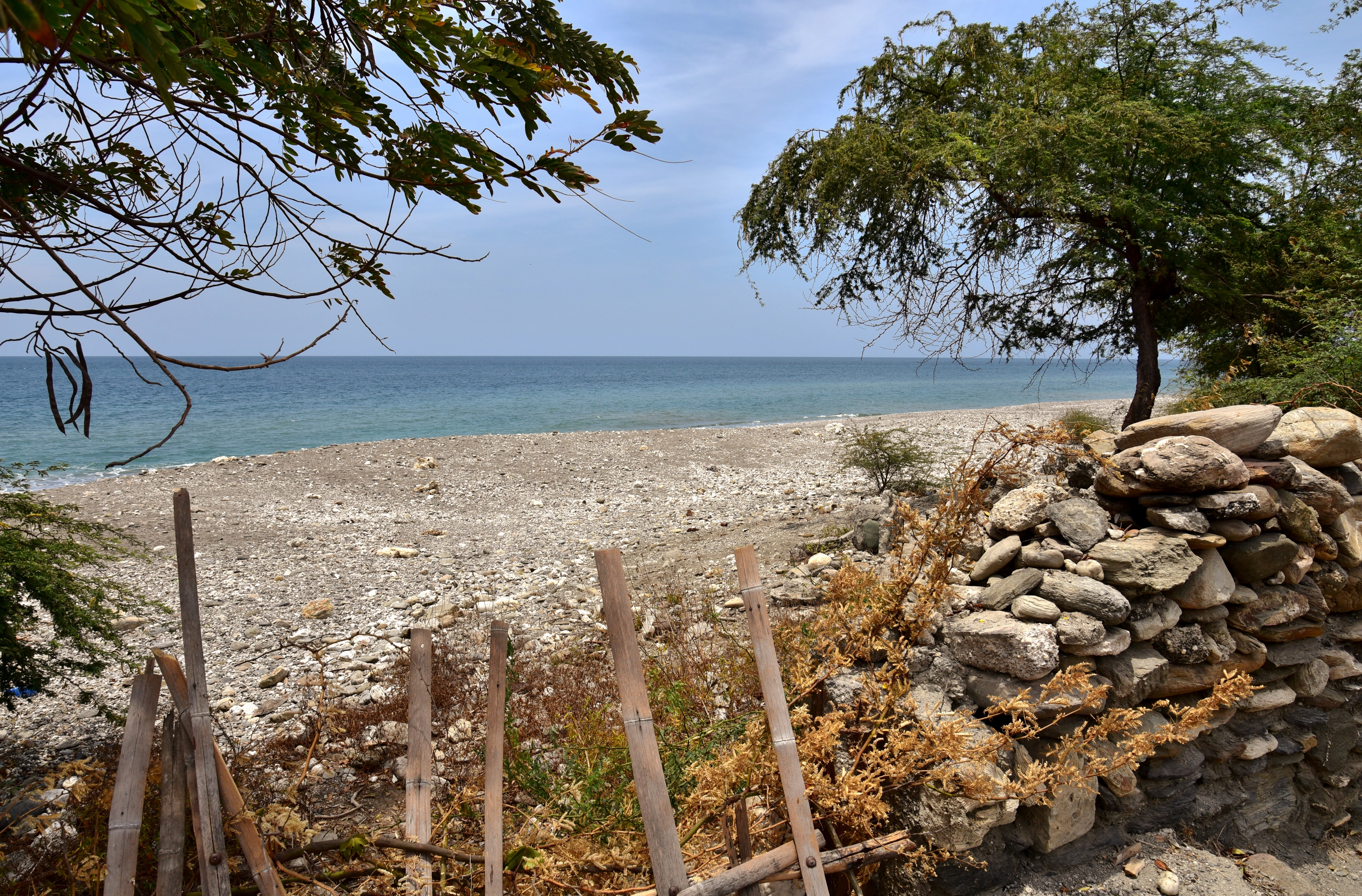
- Ombai Strait from Ai Pelo, Timor-Leste, in 2018

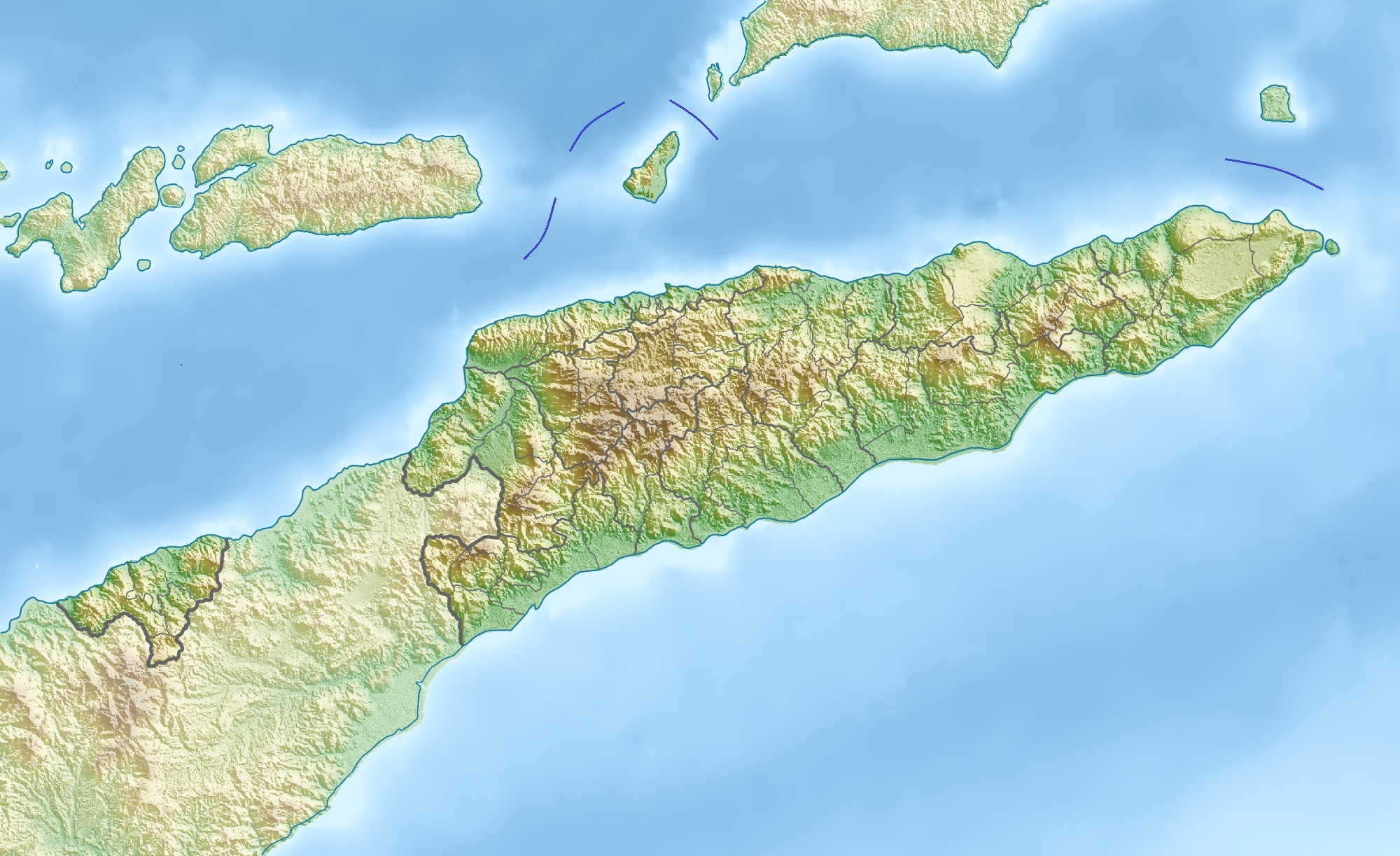
- Location within East Timor

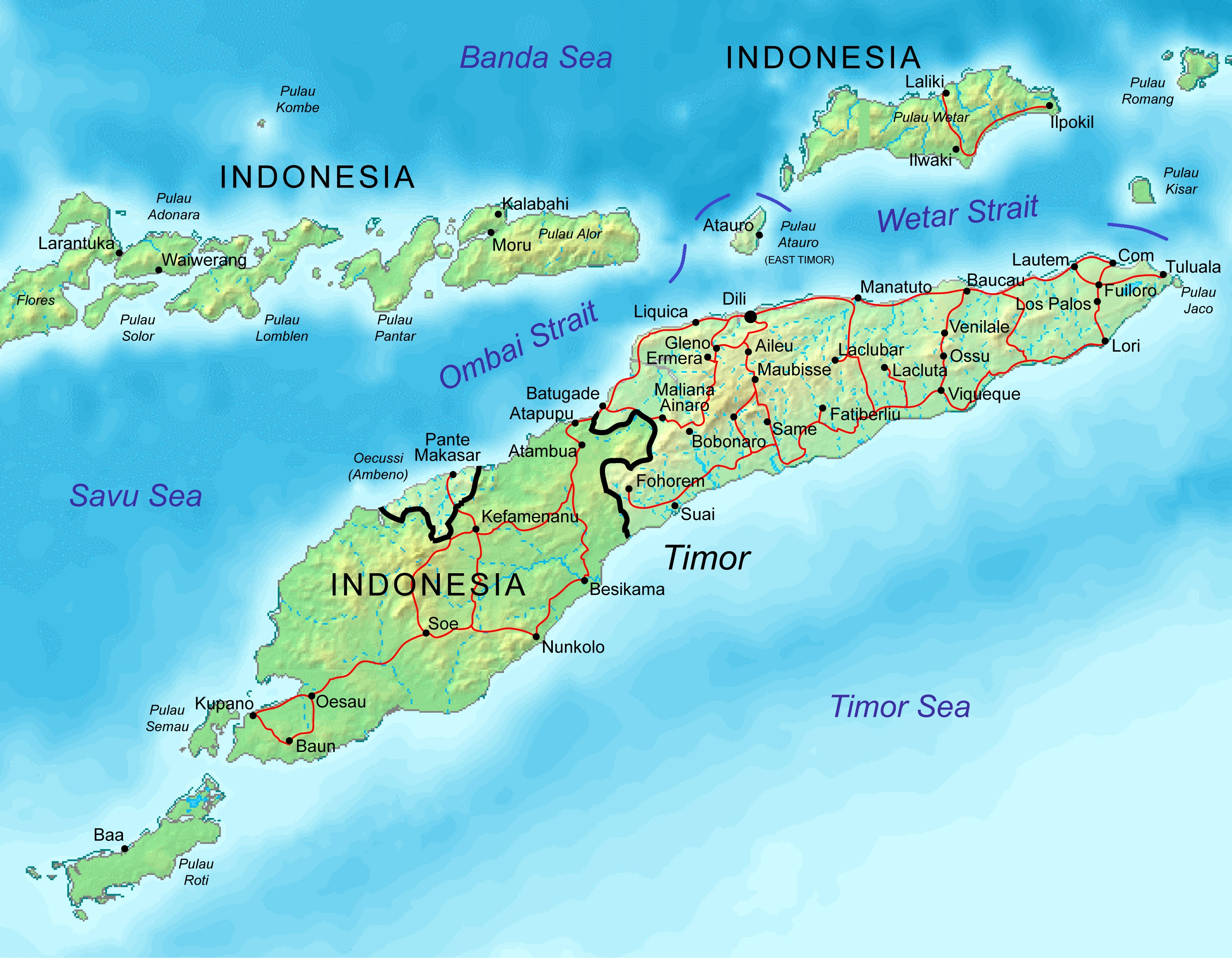
- Location: Southeast Asia
- Coordinates: 8°30′00″S 125°00′00″E
- Type: Strait
- Etymology: Alor (Ombai) Island
- Part of: Banda Sea
- Basin countries: Indonesia; Timor-Leste
- Min. width: 27 km (17 mi)
- Max. depth: 3,250 m (10,660 ft)
- Settlements: Dili
- References: Ombai Strait: Timor-Leste National Geospatial-Intelligence Agency, Bethesda, MD, USA

Ombai Strait (Indonesian: Selat Ombai, Portuguese: Estreito de Ombai, Tetum: Estreitu Ombai) is an international strait in Southeast Asia. It separates the Alor Archipelago (part of East Nusa Tenggara province) to the west from the islands of Wetar (part of Maluku Province) and Atauro (part of the nation of Timor Leste) to the east, and from Timor to the south, all these islands forming part of the Lesser Sunda Islands. The strait is also the western portion of a pair of international straits, the other one being Wetar Strait; the two straits combine to link the Pacific Ocean with the Indian Ocean.

== Etymology ==
Ombai is an alternative name for the island of Alor, in the Alor Archipelago on the other side of the strait's north, north western and western coastline.

In Tetum, the expression tasi feto (lit. transl. 'female sea') is often used to refer to the 'Ombai-Wetar Strait', which extends along most of Timor's northern shores. The counterpart of that body of water, the Timor Sea, which has larger waves, is more turbid, and washes the whole of Timor's southern coastline, is commonly referred to in Tetum as tasi mane (lit. transl. 'male sea').

== Geography ==
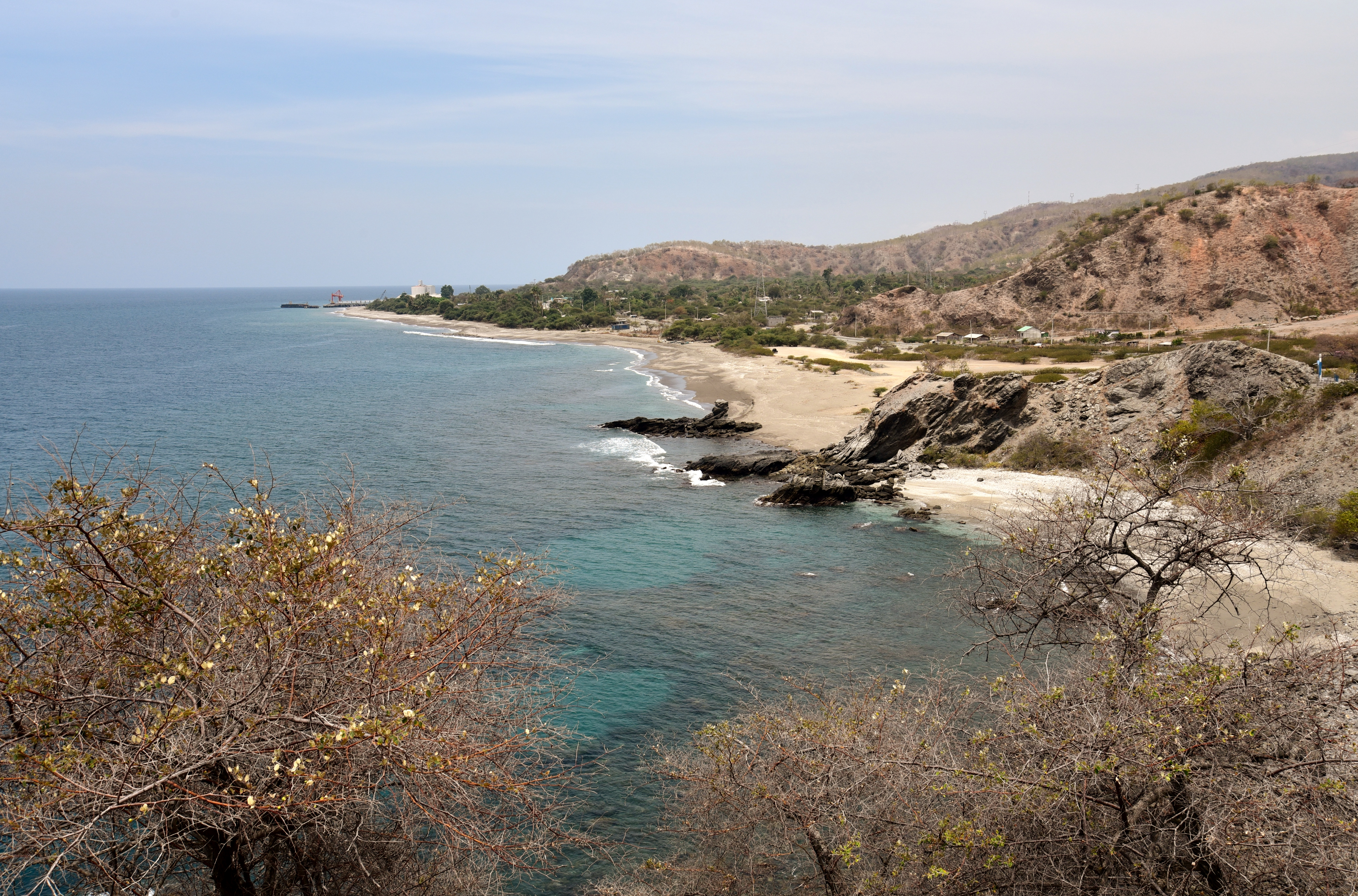
The strait from Inur Pilila, Lauhata, Timor-Leste, in 2018

Ombai Strait is relatively narrow and deep (3,250 m (10,660 ft)). It has complex and extreme bathymetry, ranging from narrow reef flats (often less than 60 m (200 ft) wide) partly covered with seagrass and coral, to 3,000 m (9,800 ft) depths within 20 km (12 mi) of the coast.

The strait separates the Alor Archipelago from the islands of Wetar, Atauro, and Timor in the Lesser Sunda Islands. It also straddles the boundary between the Banda Sea (in its north east) and the Savu Sea (in its south west).

The Alor Archipelago, and the western part of Timor except the coastal exclave of Oecusse, which is on the north coast of western Timor, are part of the province of East Nusa Tenggara, Indonesia. Wetar is part of the Maluku Province of Indonesia. Atauro, Oecusse, and the eastern part of Timor comprise the nation of Timor-Leste.

The southern limit of the Banda Sea runs along the southern edge of the strait from the eastern extremity of Timor along its north coast as far south west as longitude 125° East. From that point, the Banda Sea's western limit heads north to Alor Island, where it starts a further run, east, along Alor's south coast, around its east point, and beyond.

Meanwhile, Ombai Strait continues to run from longitude 125° East in a south westerly direction, now within the limits of the Savu Sea. It extends, as part of that sea, at least as far south west as Batek Island, at the north western tip of Oecusse.

From Ombai Strait's south western, Savu Sea, end, the strait heads in a generally north eastern direction, while gradually narrowing. At its narrowest point between the Alor Archipelago and Timor, it is 27 km (17 mi) wide, and its navigable waters are 26 km (16 mi) across.

Beyond the end of the channel at the strait's north eastern extremity, between the islands of Alor and Atauro, is the Flores Sea to the north west and north, and the Banda Sea to the north east. That channel is 35 km (22 mi) wide at its narrowest point, where the navigable waters are 34 km (21 mi) across. To the east of the strait, and linking with it south of Atauro, is Wetar Strait. To the east of the latter strait are the south eastern reaches of the Banda Sea, and the southernmost of the Maluku Islands.

As such, Ombai Strait is one of two deep water passages in the Indonesian archipelago that link the waters of the Pacific and Indian Oceans, the other one being Wetar Strait. The archipelago is the only interocean connection on earth at low latitudes, and the exchange of water between the two oceans is known as the Indonesian Throughflow (ITF).

The ITF flows in a generally north east to south west direction. Its main pathway runs from the Pacific Ocean into the Banda Sea via the Celebes Sea, Makassar Strait and the Java and Flores Seas. Some of the ITF then passes directly into Ombai Strait, and some of it flows there indirectly, around Wetar Island's eastern end, and then via Wetar Strait.

By this and other ITF pathways, nutrient-rich water from the Pacific Ocean runs into the Indian Ocean, at a rate 50 times faster than the discharge of the Amazon River. During El Niño, the water is cooler and inhibits rain. In Ombai Strait, there is also a counterflowing eastwards current, which affects the strait's overall mix of nutrients, temperatures and salinity levels.

The eastwards current is an extension of the South Java Current (SJC), and its deeper Undercurrent (SJUC), from the Savu Sea into the strait. During the dry season (March–November), the strong, prevailing westwards ITF currents in the strait are at an annual maximum at the surface in the southern part of the strait, and a front appears to trap the portion of the SJC inside the strait to within ~10–15 km (6.2–9.3 mi) of the strait's northern boundary. By contrast, the SJUC, when present, is observed across the entire strait. The ITF currents are at their weakest during the north-east monsoon rainy season (December–February), when there are also strong westerly (onshore) winds and waves.

== Ecology ==
=== Flora ===
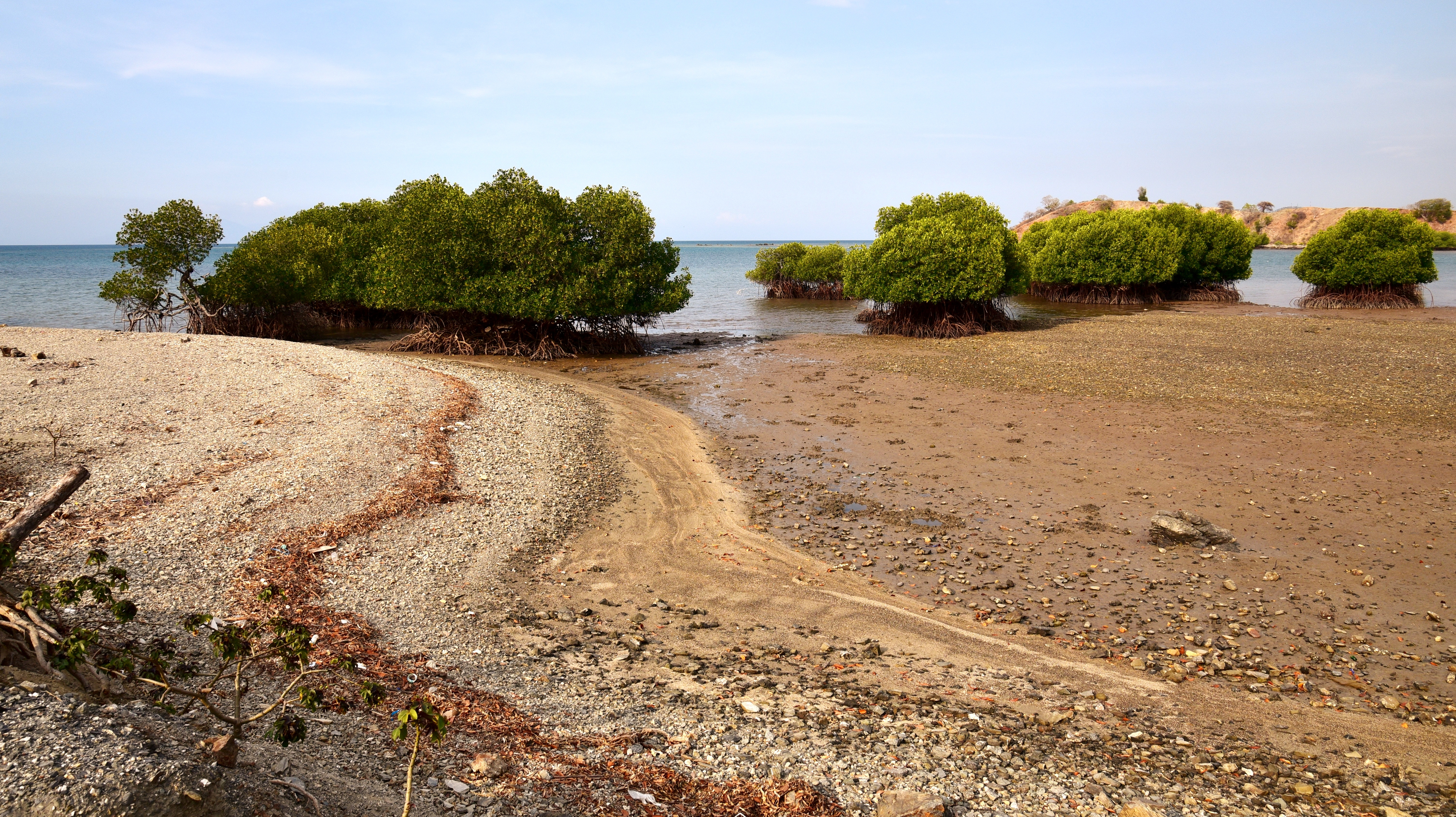
Mudflats and mangroves at Kampungbaru, Ulmera, near Tibar Bay, Timor-Leste, in 2018

Along the northern littoral of Timor-Leste, including the strait, the shallow coastal waters are dominated by a seagrass bed about 2,200 ha (5,400 acres) in total area. Seagrass beds protect coral reefs from sedimentation and are feeding grounds for dugong (Dugong dugon), an endangered species. Seven genera of seagrass are known to exist off Timor-Leste's coastline as a whole.

Timor-Leste's coastal waters have also traditionally hosted mangrove forests. Together with seagrasses and coral reefs, they are the primary breeding grounds for many species of fish and shellfish. However, the country's mangrove cover has very substantially declined since 1940, and in Ombai Strait is now confined to the coastline and hinterland between Tibar and the Bay of Dili.

A survey of Tibar Bay carried out in 2016 found three mangrove species, namely Sonneratia alba, which was the dominant species, Avicennia marina and Rhizophora stylosa. The report of another survey, carried out in 2017, stated that the dominant species in the area was Sonneratia albia, and that there were some clusters of Rhizophora apiculata, Ceriops tagal, and Lumnitzera.

The 2016 survey report estimated the total area of mangrove in the bay to be 14 ha (35 acres); the 2017 survey report's estimate was 22 ha (54 acres). According to the latter report, tree density was relatively low, at around 100–400 trees per hectare, and the mangrove cluster was heavily degraded, due to direct and indirect human activities. The former activities included fish pond and salt pan development, mangrove cutting, and cattle grazing. The latter activities were sea level rise, and siltation due to erosion in the hills on the landward side of the mangroves.

In parts of Ombai Strait, and especially close to the coast of Alor Island, elevated phytoplankton blooms or concentrations (and therefore availability of food for other species) have been observed, particularly during the dry south-east monsoon. The physical structure of the strait makes it likely that such concentrations are driven by fronts and vertical flows caused by some combination of tidal currents or topographic effects.

A study published in 2002 noted persistent flow-induced upwelling and frontal features in the strait, together with subjective evidence of extremely strong tides. The study concluded that the upwelling and frontal features coincided with large phytoplankton blooms and significantly affected the concentration and distribution of chlorophyll in the Savu Sea. According to the study report, it is likely that the mean flow associated with the ITF also plays a role in causing the blooms.

=== Fauna ===
The Ombai-Wetar corridor is heavily used by whales, dolphins, whale sharks (Rhincodon typus) and manta rays. The two straits combine to form a major migratory route for these species between the Pacific and Indian Oceans. Timor-Leste, on the south side of the two straits, is a recognized global hotspot for whales and dolphins.

Ombai Strait in particular has been identified as a critical habitat for sperm whales (Physeter macrocephalus), blue whales (Balaenoptera musculus), giant oceanic manta rays (Manta birostris) and sea turtles (Cheloniidae), amongst other endangered, threatened and protected species. Other species that have been observed consistently in the strait include false killer whales (Pseudorca crassidens), and spinner dolphins (Stenella longirostris), both of them in huge pods made up of large numbers of individuals.

The report of a 2013 survey of Tibar Bay, on Ombai Strait's southern shore not far west of Dili, Timor-Leste, noted that a local dive tourism operator had made frequent sightings of dugong along the coast immediately east of the bay, and that there were also anecdotal reports of saltwater crocodiles in the bay.

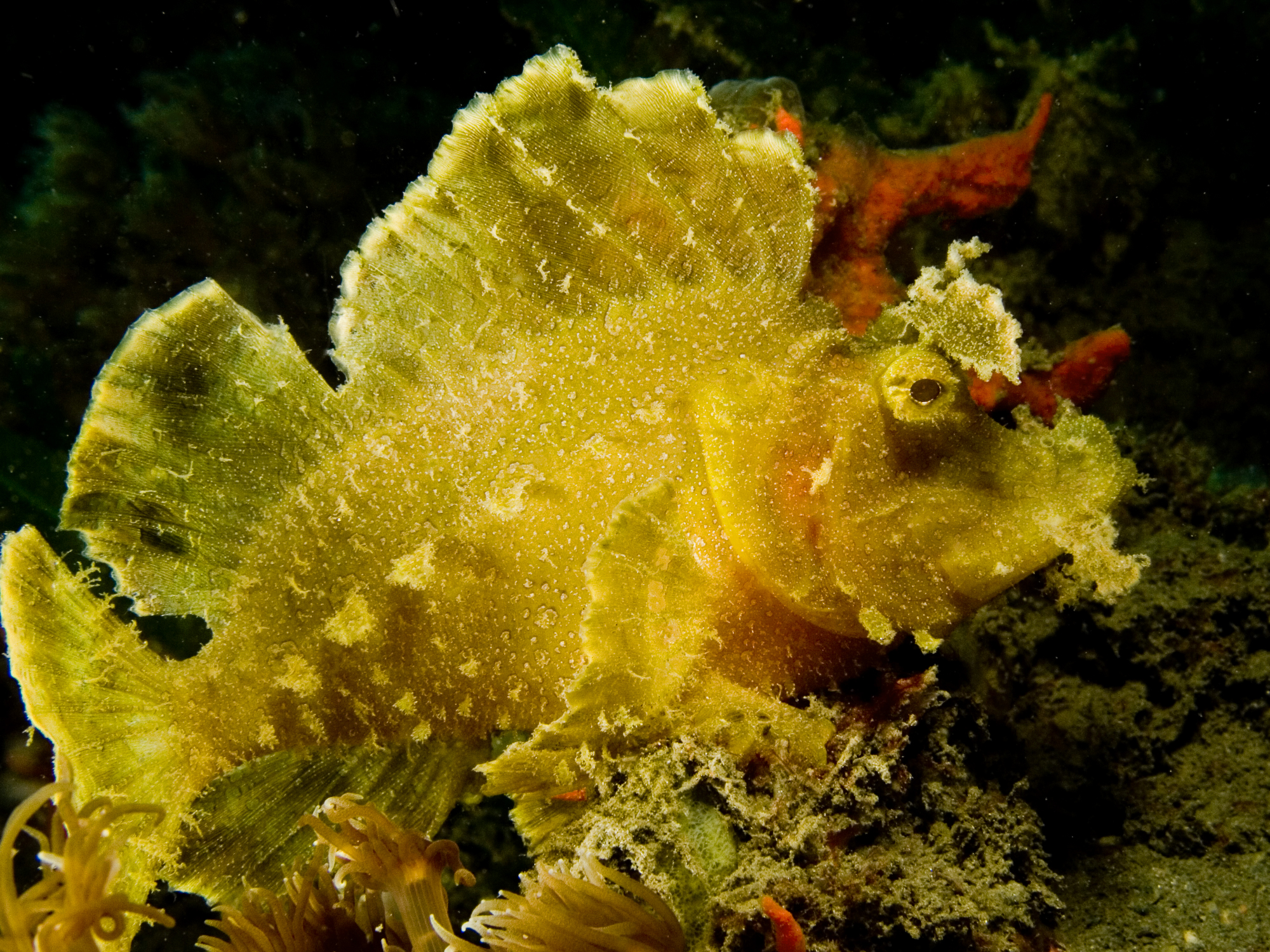
A weedy scorpionfish (Rhinopias frondosa) at Tasitolu in 2007

A short distance further east, at Tasitolu, dugongs are often observed, although as of 2019 detailed information regarding their habitat location, size, and characteristics in the area was not available. The other sea life at Tasitolu includes cephalopods, crustaceans, frogfish, harlequin ghost pipefish, small octopuses, rhinopias, sea horses, and soft coral crabs.

Ombai Strait is also part of the Coral Triangle, which is recognised as a global centre of marine biodiversity. The coastal zones of Timor-Leste have important areas of coral reef ecosystems, such as the ones at Tasitolu and in the Bay of Dili. At Tasitolu, the reefs west of Dili Rock are live, healthy and diverse, but those to the east of the rock have lower coverage and more reef rubble. At the Port of Dili inside the Bay of Dili, there are at least four different species of coral.

The Dili area, on the southern edge of the strait, is a recognised nesting ground for sea turtles, of three different species: hawksbill sea turtle (Eretmochelys imbricata; Critically Endangered (CR), according to the International Union for Conservation of Nature (IUCN) Red List), olive ridley sea turtle (Lepidochelys olivacea; Vulnerable (VU)), and green sea turtle (Chelonia mydas; Endangered (EN)). On both the Tasi Tolu Beach and the Beto Tasi Beach near Dili's international airport, there is regular hatching of sea turtles. However, in most parts of Timor-Leste sea turtles are overharvested for their eggs, skin, meat and carapace for handicraft making.

The northern edge of the strait abuts two Important Bird Areas (IBAs), Gunung Muna (on Alor, Indonesia), and Atauro (Timor-Leste). The southern edge of the strait is also the northern shore of four East Timorese IBAs. From west to east, they are Be Malae (just to the west of the Loes River), Maubara (a short distance east of the village of Maubara), Tasitolu (just to the west of Dili), and Areia Branca no Dolok Oan (on the eastern side of the Bay of Dili).

=== Humans ===
The village of Lamalera (pop. 2,500) on the south coast of Lembata, facing the south western entrance to the strait, is known for its hunting of sperm whale and other deep-sea species. The hunting has been taking place for at least six centuries, and is allowed under International Whaling Commission regulations concerning aboriginal whaling. However, conservationists worry that commercial whaling also takes place, and that hunters use their engine-powered boats all year round to catch other protected species such as manta rays, orcas (Orcinus orca), dolphins and oceanic sharks.

=== Ombai-Wetar Strait Hope Spot ===
On World Oceans Day 2020, the Ombai-Wetar Strait was designated as a Mission Blue Hope Spot. The designation recognises the importance of conserving the open waters on the north side of Timor-Leste, with their globally-significant coral reefs and marine biodiversity. It also emphasises the potential of the two straits for sustainable marine ecotourism development.

== Navigation ==
=== Commercial ===
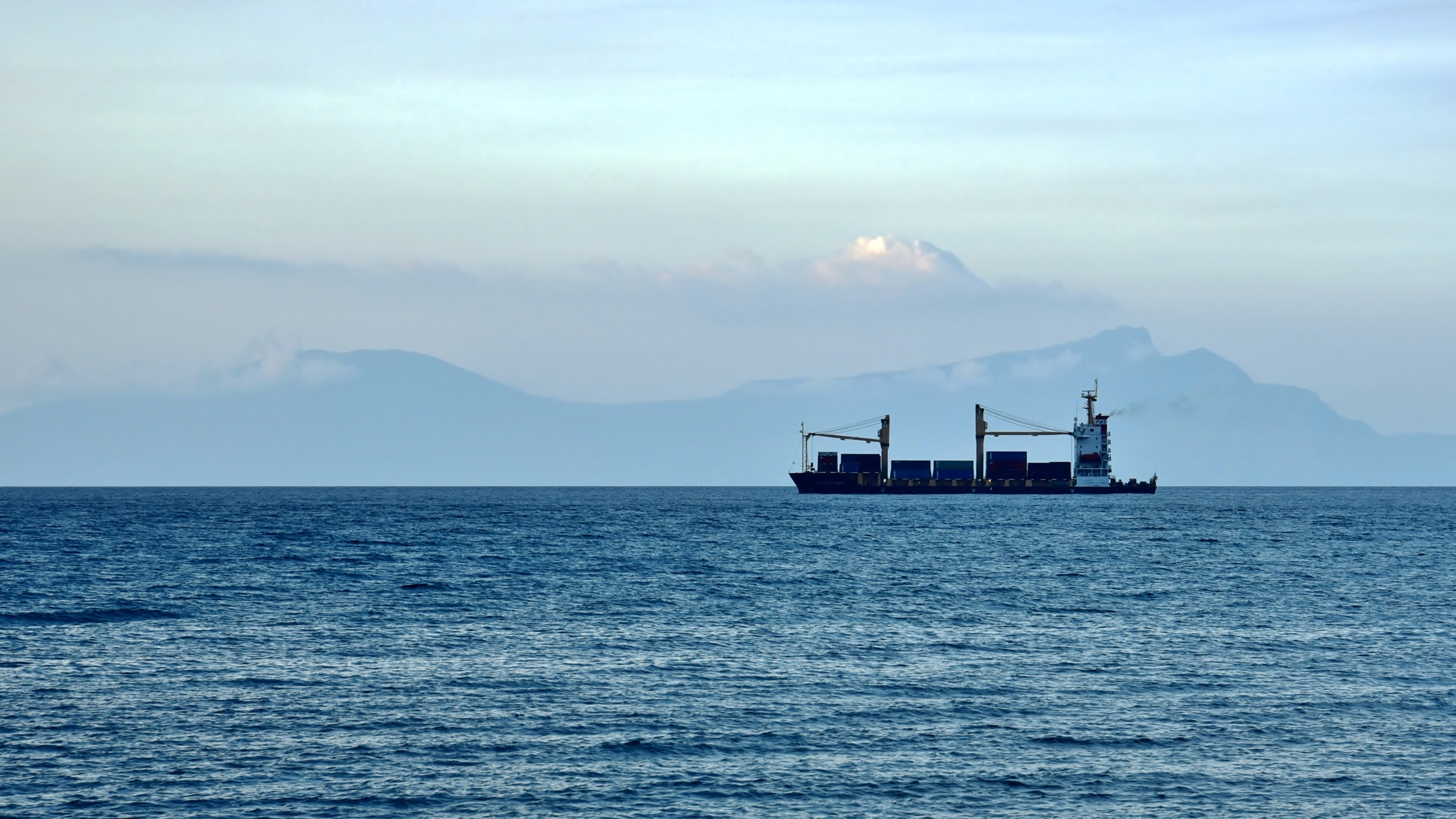
A container ship, Selatan Damai, anchored off Dili, Timor-Leste, in 2018, with Atauro in the background

Under the United Nations Convention on the Law of the Sea, a commercial vessel or aircraft has freedom of navigation or overflight solely for the purpose of continuous and expeditious transit of a strait between one part of the high seas or exclusive economic zone and another. That transit passage principle applies to Ombai Strait and Wetar Strait, as they combine to link two oceans.

The Ombai-Wetar route is longer in distance than its Strait of Malacca-Singapore Strait counterpart. The former route is therefore not really a preferred alternative path for west to east commercial traffic. However, it is sometimes used, and is considered the safest route, for the largest oil tankers transiting between the Persian Gulf and Japan, and is also used by vessels transiting between Australia and the Java Sea or East Asia.

The two straits are always critical for Timor-Leste, both in relation to its own international trade and as routes for internal transport. In Ombai Strait, internal East Timorese ferry services operate regularly between Dili and both Atauro and Oecusse. If there were any disruption in the flow of commercial shipping on the Malacca-Singapore route, the Ombai-Wetar route would also have a crucial role to play in global trade, especially for the Asia-Pacific region.

=== Military ===
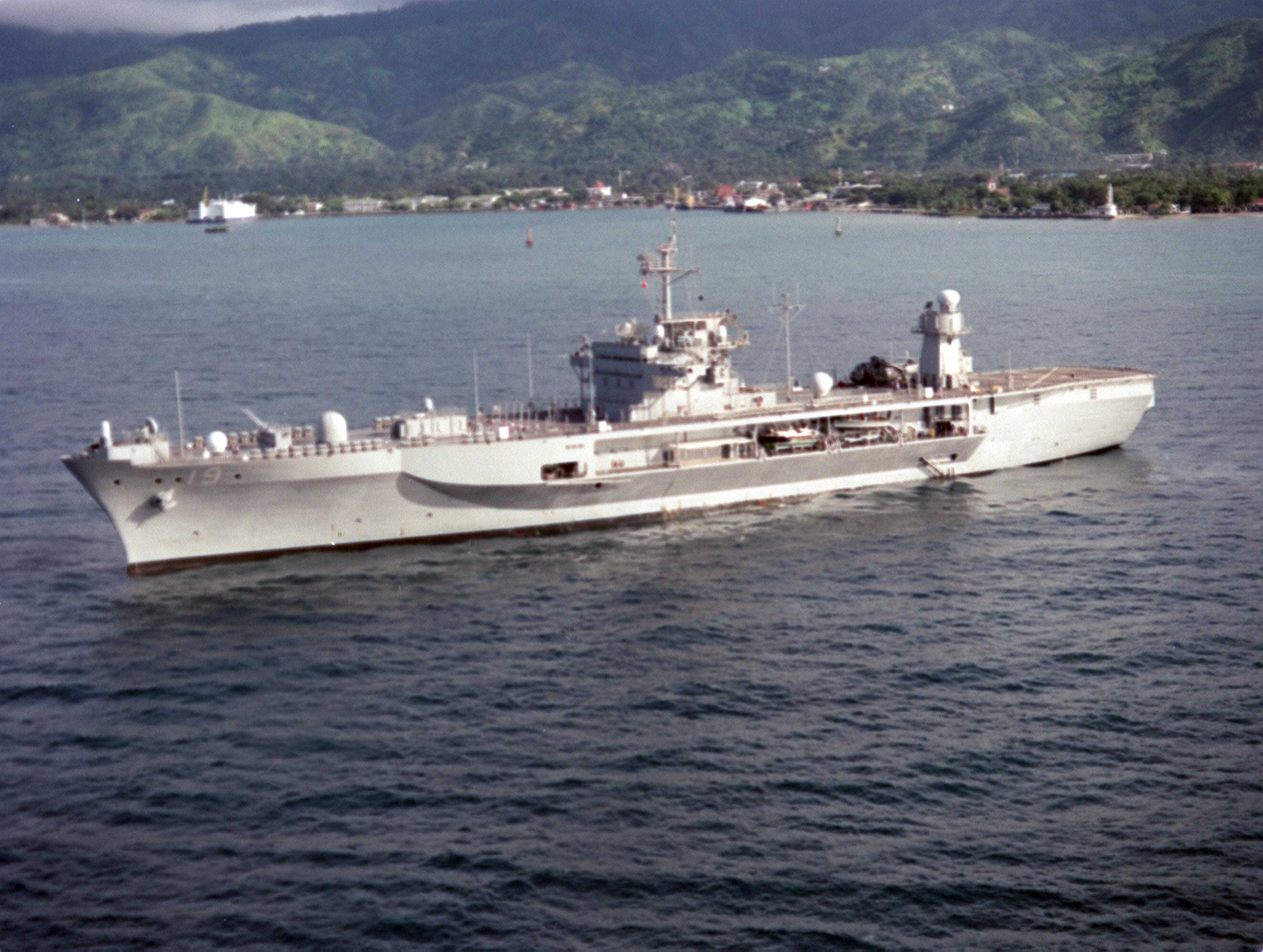
USS Blue Ridge in the Bay of Dili in 2000, with Dili in the background

The ships and aircraft of all nations, including warships, auxiliaries, and military aircraft, enjoy the right of unimpeded transit passage through straits such as the Ombai-Wetar route and their approaches. Submarines are free to transit the route submerged, as that is their normal mode of operation.

The channels of the Ombai-Wetar route are extremely deep. Timor-Leste has refused advances by China seeking off-shore oil rights and permission to set up radar arrays ostensibly to counter illegal fishing.

The two straits therefore provide a route for undetected access by nuclear-powered submarines between the two oceans they connect. In particular, they are an alternative deep water route for submerged U.S. submarines moving between Guam and stations in the Indian Ocean via the Molucca Passage, Indonesia, which separates Sulawesi from Halmahera. Although the Ombai-Wetar route is a less direct link between Guam and the Indian Ocean than the Lombok-Makassar route, it is useful because it has limited traffic and very little surveillance, with the consequence that passing submarines are less likely to be tracked.

By the mid-1970s, the Ombai-Wetar route had been identified as one of five international straits essential for passage by U.S. ballistic missile submarines, the others being Gibraltar, Malacca-Singapore, Lombok and Sunda. In 1977, a paper published by the International Institute for Strategic Studies, based in London, ranked the Ombai-Wetar route as the second-most-important strait in the world to U.S. defense interests, after the Strait of Gibraltar. The two straits are now also considered by China to be strategically significant.

== Economy ==
=== Fishing ===
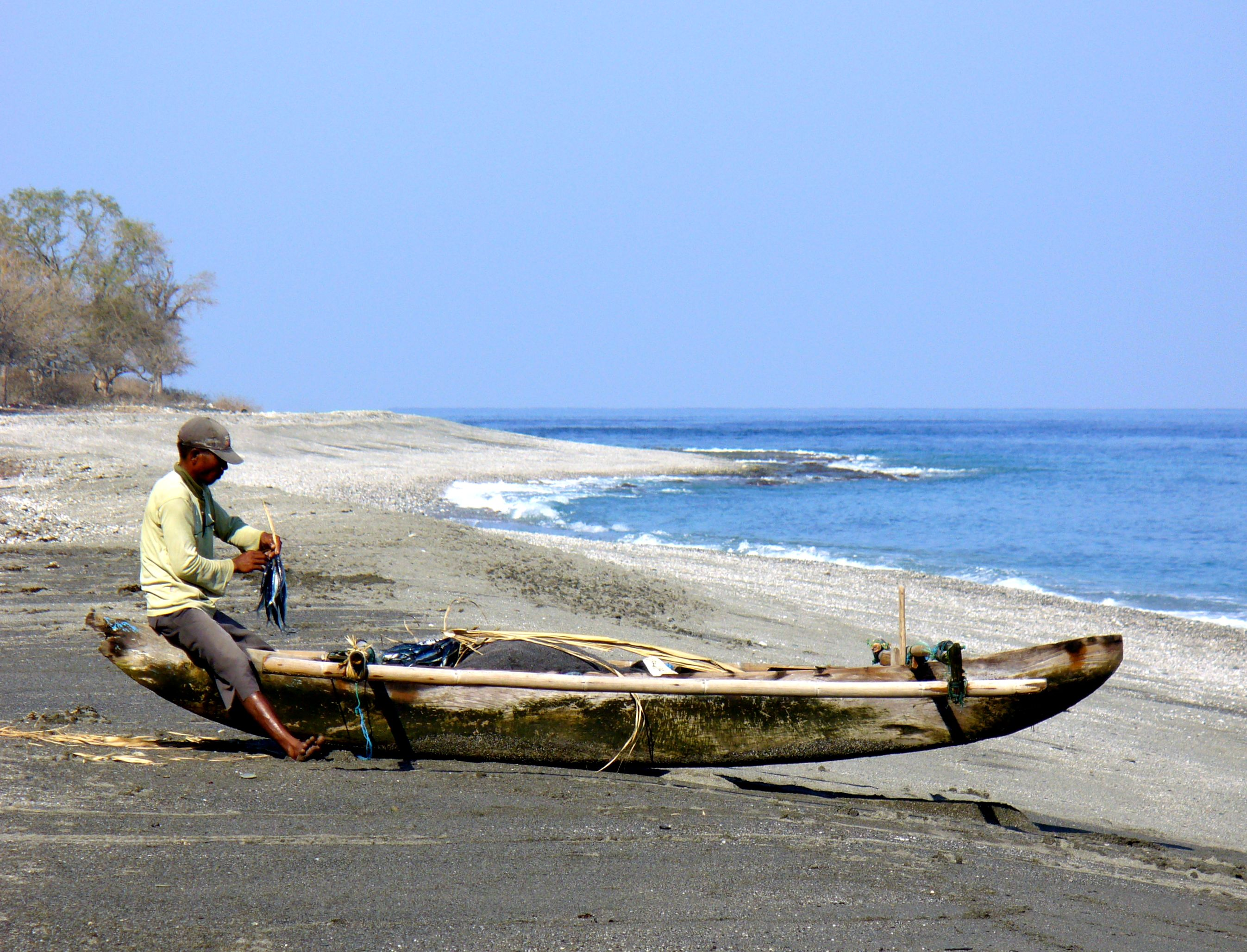
A fisher and fishing canoe at Maubara in 2006

In Timor-Leste, involvement in fishing is low by comparison with other small island countries. Along the north coast of Timor and around Atauro, including within the strait, fishing levels are higher than elsewhere in the country, other than in pockets along parts of the south coast. Many of the fishers fish part time or seasonally, and are otherwise occupied in additional activities such as carpentry, labouring or security work. Most of the fish landings are of small pelagic species, including short-bodied mackerel, sardines (Clupeidae), halfbeaks and scads (Carangidae).

A study published in 2019 observed that fishing vessels in and around the border area in Ombai Strait between East Nusa Tenggara, Indonesia, and Bobonaro, Timor-Leste, were dominated by non-motorized and outboard motorized boats. Gill nets and handlines were widely used. Fishing grounds were limited, and the activities of fishermen were highly disrupted by a growing number of illegal fishing practices. Small pelagic fish in the Indonesia–Timor-Leste border area were regarded as shared fish stock and captured by fishermen from both countries. The report of the study recommended transboundary fisheries management in the border area, using an ecosystem-based approach.

A 2021 study concluded that a number of species of sardines (and also other small pelagic fish) were caught on the north coast of East Timor, with flat-bodied sardinellas (S. gibbosa etc.) being the dominant species group landed at Loes, and relatively abundant at Comoro. At most sites, catches of these pelagic species varied moderately between years, and were larger during the rainy season and when medium-sized turbid plumes were extending from river mouths. Fishers at various sites generally perceived a decline in landings over the previous 20 years. They attributed the decline to several human factors, including higher fishing effort, plastic pollution, motorisation of canoes and larger-scale, less selective fishing gear. Some sardine species were sold readily to traders; others were commonly kept for immediate home consumption.

Another of the strait's pelagic fisheries is flying fish (Exocoetidae); both the meat and eggs of flying fish can be used. According to another 2021 study, the exploitation rate of flying fish in Ombai Strait is relatively low, and at a rational and sustainable utilisation range. Five species of flying fish were found. The waters in the strait were relatively fertile, pattern recruitment occurred throughout the year, and peak recruitment was in September and June. Adult fish groups were dominant, growth was fast, and the natural mortality rate was higher than the fishing mortality rate.

=== Tourism ===
Timor-Leste's whale watching industry is focused on the Ombai-Wetar route, and has been growing rapidly since the 2010s. Annual migrations of whales and dolphins through the route's generally calm waters provide some of the best and most accessible whale watching in the world. The cetaceans migrating along the route are often very close to shore; networks of local residents record their movements and behaviour, and then report it in 'real time' to researchers and Dili-based whale watching tour operators.

The island of Atauro, at the north eastern end of the strait, has been described as the highlight of any diving trip to Timor-Leste. Atauro's west coast dive sites, located within the strait, are said to be the best way to experience the island's diving. There are other dive sites in the strait, near Dili including Tasitolu, and dive sites at Alor, but Alor's main diving areas are not within the strait.
