= Diving in Timor-Leste =

Recreational diving region description

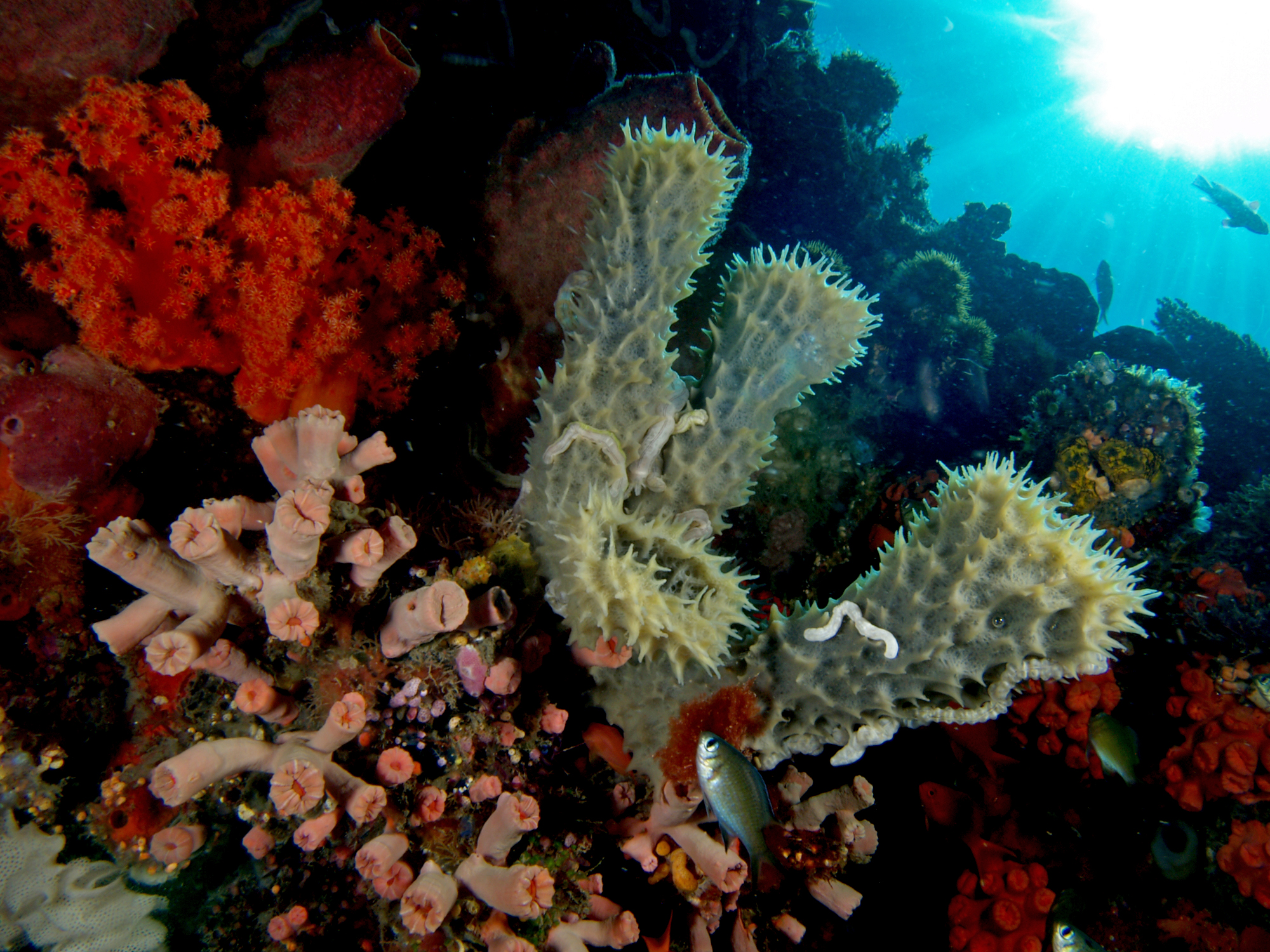
Niphates callista (tube sponge) with sea cucumbers and cup corals –

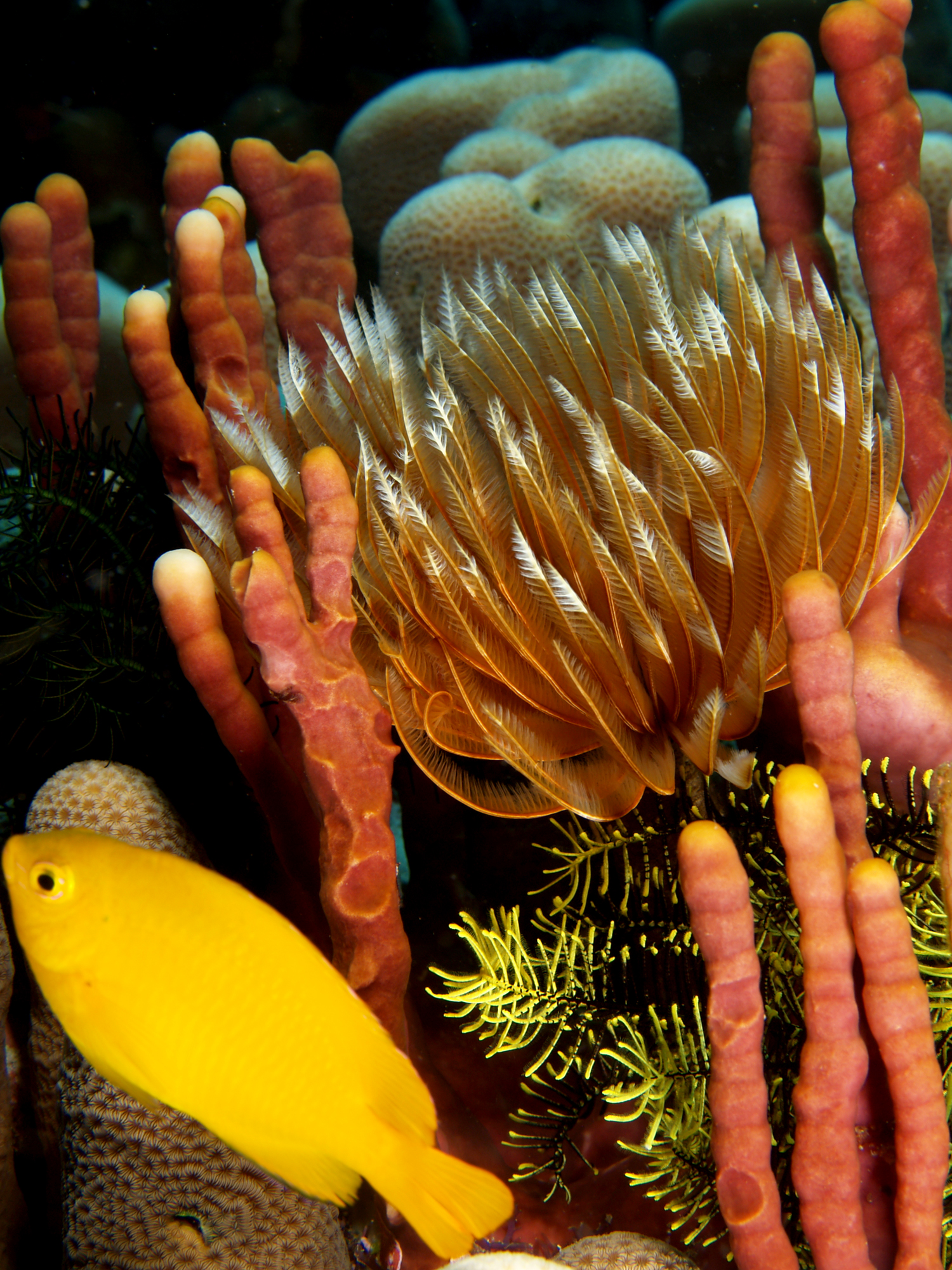
Sabellastarte sanctijosephi (Feather duster worm) in Oceanapia amboinensis (Sponge) –

Timor-Leste has some of the best dive sites in the world due to its location, warm waters, minimalist tourist trade and lack of commercial fishing or heavy industry.

Situated in the Coral Triangle, Timor is surrounded by deep water (about 2,500m between Liquiçá and Alor Island, Indonesia) that gives home to coral and fish life, including the annual migration of whales through the Ombai Strait and Wetar Strait.

== See also ==
- Shipwrecks of Timor-Leste
