= Rhinopias cea =

Conservation status
- Data Deficient (IUCN 3.1)

Scientific classification
- Kingdom: Animalia
- Phylum: Chordata
- Class: Actinopterygii
- Order: Perciformes
- Family: Scorpaenidae
- Genus: Rhinopias
- Species: R. cea

Binomial name
- Rhinopias cea J. E. Randall & Disalvo, 1997

Species of fish

Rhinopias cea, or Cea's scorpionfish, is a species of marine ray-finned fish belonging to the family Scorpaenidae, the scorpionfishes. This species is only known from two sites in the southern Pacific Ocean.

== Taxonomy ==
Rhinopias cea was first formally described in 1997 by the American biologists John E. Randall and Louis Henry DiSalvo Chalfant with the type locality is given as Motu Iti, Easter Island. The holotype was caught by hand in February 1985. The specific name honours the Chilean physician, SCUBA diver, photographer, filmmaker and spearfisherman Alfredo Cea Egaña in recognition of his contribution to the authors knowledge of the fishes of Easter Island.

== Description ==
Rhinopias cea is similar to R. argoliba and shares a low dorsal fin and a low number of flaps and tentacles on the skin. The overall colour is reddish brown but differs from R. argoliba in being more mottled and in not possessing the white teardrop shaped mark between the eye and the rear end of the upper jaw. There is a pair of obvious dark blotches on the body above the pectoral fin. This species attains a maximum length of 20.2 cm (8.0 in).

== Distribution and habitat ==
Rhinopias cea is found in the South Pacific Ocean and has been recorded at only two localities and is known from only two specimens, one from each locality. The holotype was collected off Easter Island in 1985 while the second specimen was collected at Rapa Iti in French Polynesia in 1990. The holotype was collected from an area of rocky habitat.

== Biology ==
Rhinopias cea is little known as there are only two recorded sightings and the IUCN classify it as Data Deficient. It is likely that this species is an ambush predator of smaller fishes and crustaceans, as are its congeners.
