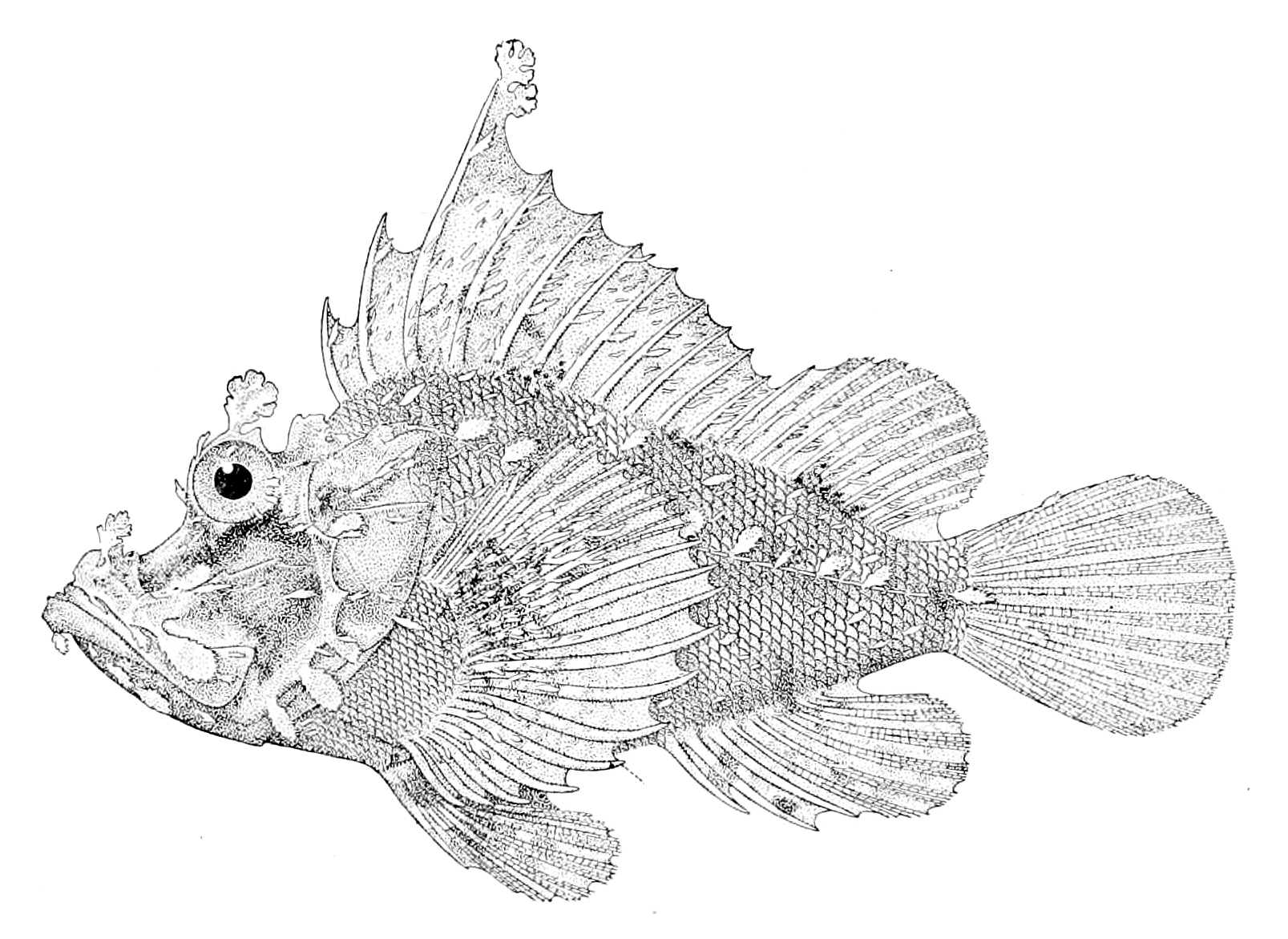

Conservation status
- Least Concern (IUCN 3.1)

Scientific classification
- Kingdom: Animalia
- Phylum: Chordata
- Class: Actinopterygii
- Order: Perciformes
- Family: Scorpaenidae
- Genus: Rhinopias
- Species: R. xenops

Binomial name
- Rhinopias xenops (Gilbert, 1905)

Synonyms
- Peloropsis xenops Gilbert, 1905

= Rhinopias xenops =

Species of fish

Rhinopias xenops, the strange-eyed scorpionfish, is a species of marine ray-finned fish belonging to the family Scorpaenidae, the scorpionfishes. This species is found in the Pacific Ocean.

== Taxonomy ==
Rhinopias xenops was first formally described as Peloropsis xenops in 1905 by the American ichthyologist Charles Henry Gilbert with the type locality given as the Avau Channel, the channel separating the islands of Maui and Lanai in Hawaii. Peloropsis was also a new genus and P. xenops was its only species. However, in 1973 William N. Eschmeyer, Yoshitsugu Hirosake and Tokiharu Abe moved this species into the genus Rhinopias, making Peloropsis a junior synonym of that taxon. The specific name xenops is a compound of xeno meaning "different" and ops meaning "eye", an allusion to the raised upper orbits of the eyes sticking above the dorsal profile of the head.

== Description ==
Rhinopias xenops has 12 spines and 9 soft rays in the dorsal fin with 3 spines and 5 soft rays in the anal fin. The lacrimal bone has 2 rounded lobes over the maxillary and there are 3 or 4 spines on the suborbital ridge but these are weak and may be divided. The first spine on the lateral facet of the lacrimal bone. It has a compressed head and body with a long snout ending in a raised rostrum. The overall colour is reddish with small purplish speckling on the upper head and body with a large white marking near the base of the spiny part of the dorsal fin. There are more white patches above the lateral line, on the head, pectoral fin and elsewhere n the body.

== Distribution and habitat ==
Rhinopias xenops is found in the Pacific Ocean, it was thought to be endemic to the Hawaiian Archipelago but has since been found off southern Japan. The Japanese specimens are similar to the Hawaiian specimens but there are consistent differences in colouration and patterning, and they may be a different species. This is a rare demersal fish found at depths between 10 and 124 m (33 and 407 ft) on substrates of either rocks or coral.
