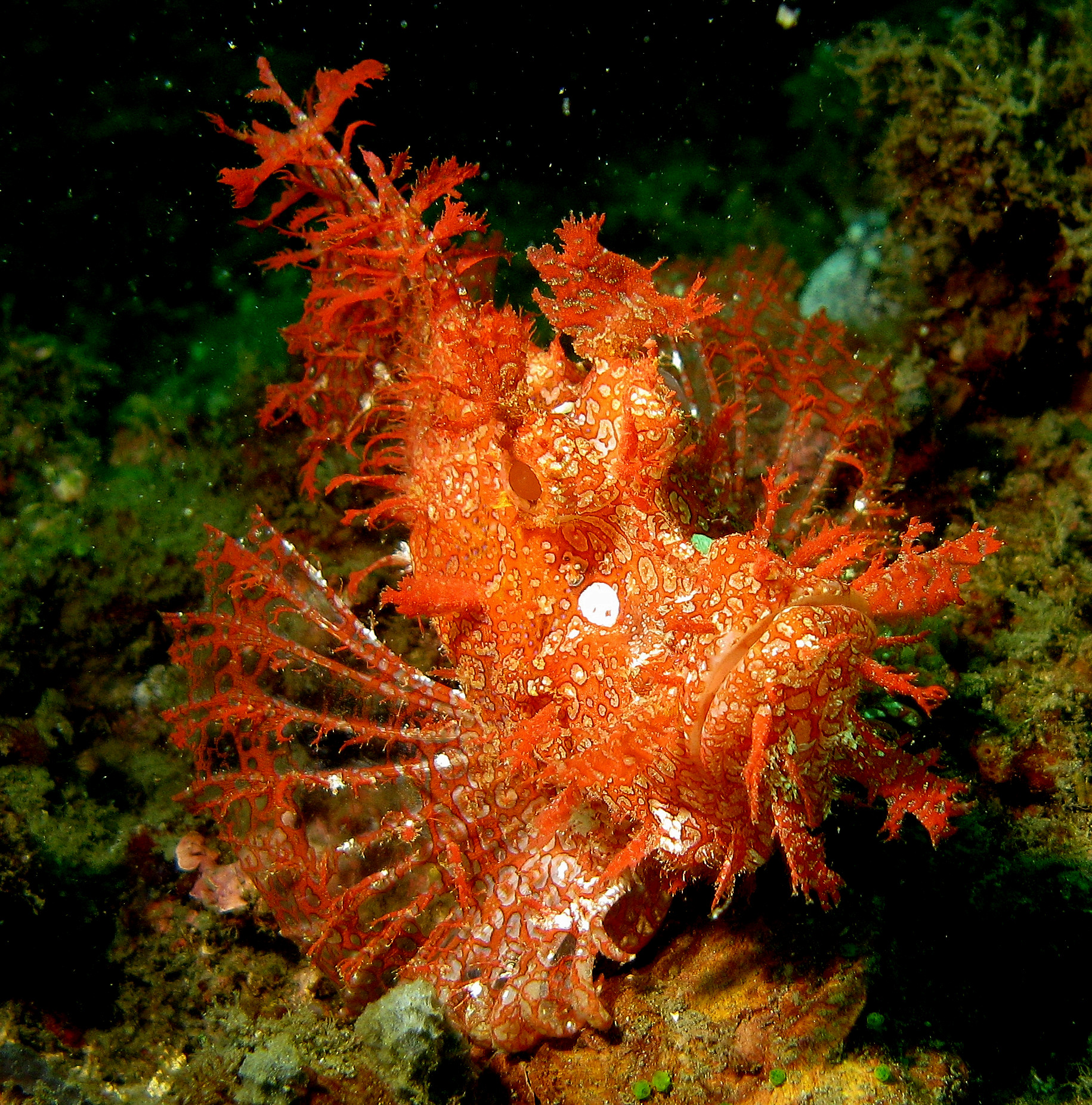
- Weedy scorpionfish (Rhinopias frondosa) taken in Indonesia in 2008

Scientific classification
- Kingdom: Animalia
- Phylum: Chordata
- Class: Actinopterygii
- Division: Teleostei
- Order: Perciformes
- Suborder: Scorpaenoidei
- Family: Scorpaenidae
- Subfamily: Scorpaeninae
- Genus: Rhinopias; T. N. Gill, 1905

Type species
- Scorpaena frondosa Günther, 1893

Synonyms
- Peloropsis Gilbert, 1905

= Rhinopias =

Genus of fishes

Rhinopias is a genus of marine ray-finned fish belonging to the family Scorpaenidae, the scorpionfishes. The species in this genus are found in the Indian and Pacific oceans.

== Taxonomy ==
Rhinopiaswas described as a genus in 1905 by the American ichthyologist Theodore Gill, Gill described it as a monotypic genus and designated Scorpaena frondosa as its type species. Scorpaena frondosa had originally been described in 1893 by the German-born British zoologist Albert Günther with its type locality given as Mauritius. The genus name is a combination of rhino meaning "snout" and op meaning "eye", an allusion to he upturned snout and raised orbits of R. frondosa with the suffix ias which is used in some Greek names for fishes, for example Xiphias.

== Species ==
There are six recognized species in this genus as of 2022:

| Image | Scientific name | Distribution | Common name |
|---|---|---|---|
| | Rhinopias aphanes Eschmeyer, 1973 | Western Pacific | Laced scorpionfish |
| | Rhinopias argoliba Eschmeyer, Hirosake & T. Abe, 1973 | Sagami Bay, Japan and the Coral Sea | Argoliba scorpionfish |
| | Rhinopias cea J. E. Randall & Disalvo, 1997 | Easter Island | Cea's Scorpionfish. |
| | Rhinopias eschmeyeri Condé, 1977 | Indo-West Pacific | Eschmeyer's scorpionfish. |
| | Rhinopias frondosa (Günther, 1892) | Indo-West Pacific | Weedy scorpionfish |
| | Rhinopias xenops (C. H. Gilbert, 1905) | Hawaii and the Kii Peninsula, Japan | |

There is some doubt as to whether R. eschmeyeri is a synonym of R. frondosa, with the two possibly being different sexes of a sexually dimorphic single species.

== Characteristics ==
Rhinopias scorpionfishes are distinguished by having 12 spines i their dorsal fins and 3 spines in their anal fins. Their pectoral fins contain 12-18 fin rays with the lower rays being thickened. The soft fin rays of the dorsal and anal fins, as well as the upper fin rays of the pectoral fins, are branched. In adults the head and body are highly compressed with the width of the head being less than that of the body. The body is also very deep, the depth being 38-54% of its standard length. The body has a covering of small cycloid scales. There are teeth on the palatine and there are no interorbital ridges or tympanic spines but they do have upper post-temporal spines. These scorpionfishes vary in size from a maximum recorded total length of 15.3 cm (6.0 in) in R. xenops to 25 cm (9.8 in) in R. aphanes .

== Distribution and habitat ==
Rhinopias scorpionfishes have an Indo-Pacific distribution from the coast of eastern Africa to Hawaii and Easter Island. They are demersal fish, found in habitats with soft substrate and strong currents. They can occur in shallow waters down to around 300 m (980 ft).

== Biology ==
Rhinopias scorpionfishes are ambush predators that rest on the substrate waiting for crustaceans and smaller fishes to come within the range of their strike. These scorpionfish also frequently shed an outer layer of skin because they are so sedentary that exoparasites and algae can quickly aggregate on their skin, so to solve this issue, the scorpionfish will shed its outer layer of skin, referred to as the cuticle. Rhinopias scorpionfishes have venom in their fin spines.

== Utilization ==
Rhinopias scorpionfishes command a high price in the aquarium trade.
