= Lake Be Malae =

Lagoon in Timor-Leste

Coordinates: 08°52′S 125°00′E

Portuguese name
- Portuguese: Lago Bemalae

Tetum name
- Tetum: Bemalae

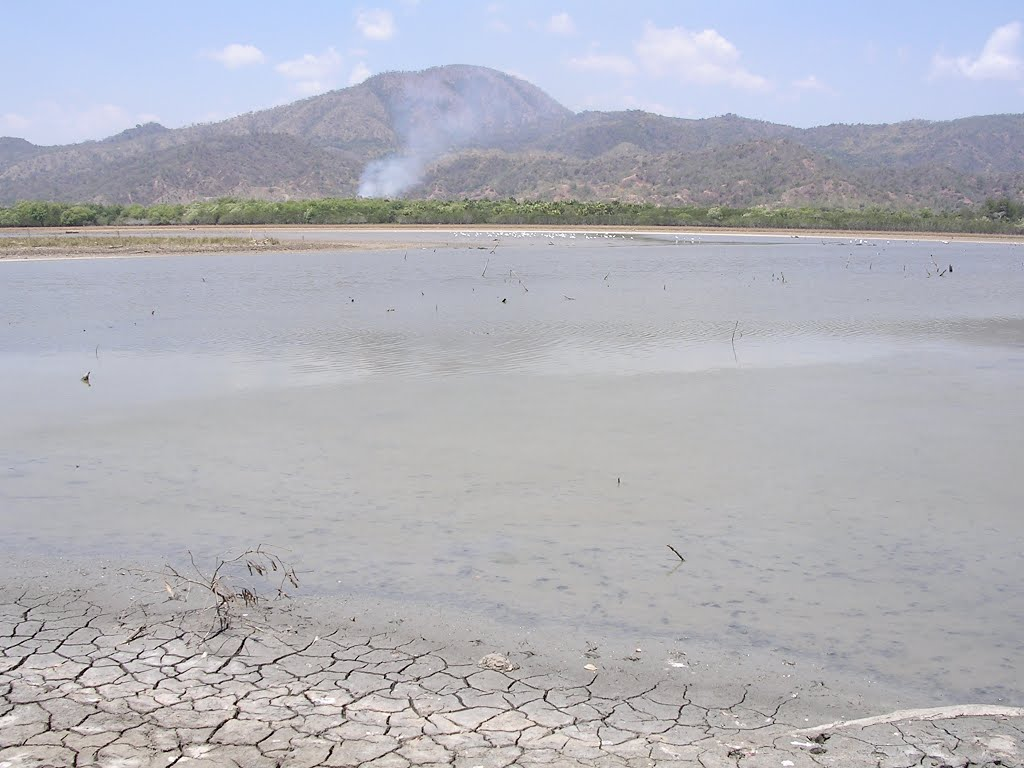
View of lake with waterbirds in the distance

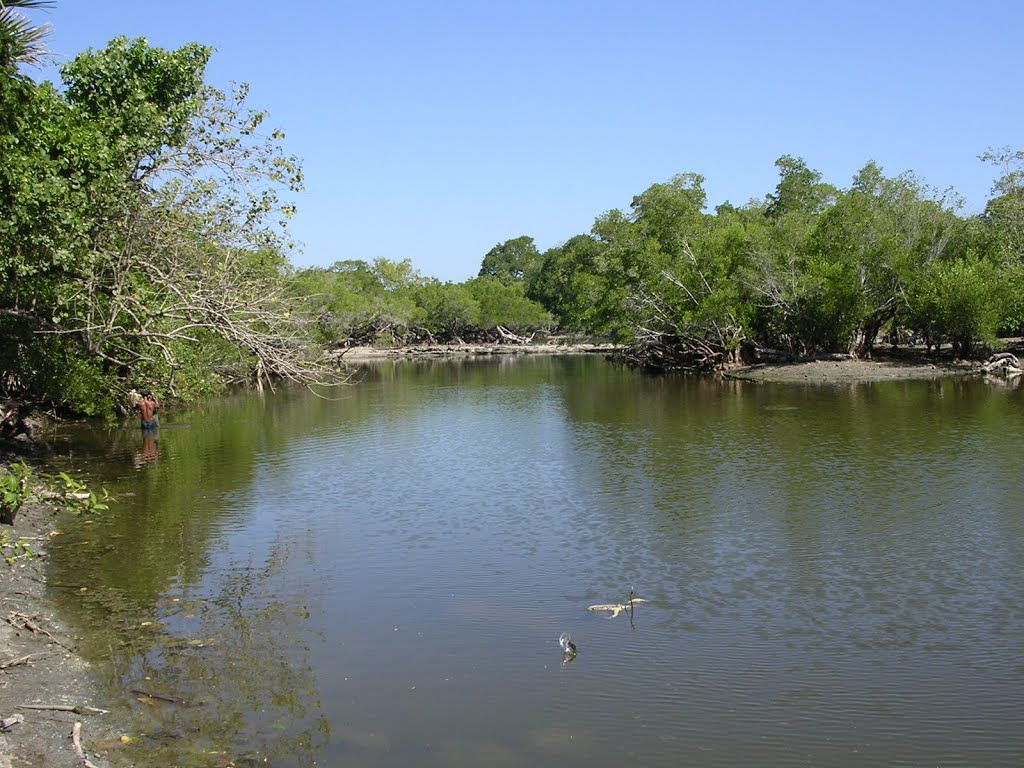
Mangrove-lined channel at the lake outlet towards the beach

Lake Be Malae, also spelt Bemalae, is a 3,000 hectares (7,400 acres) lagoon in the district of Bobonaro on the north-west coast of Timor-Leste, a country occupying the eastern end of the island of Timor in the Lesser Sunda Islands of Wallacea.

== Description ==
The lake is a broad and shallow expanse of saline water and mudflats which sometimes largely dries up. Its margins are vegetated by mangroves and dry forest. Its outlet is a winding, mangrove-lined channel leading to the sea.

== Birds ==
The lake and its surrounds have been identified by BirdLife International as a 28,000 ha Important Bird Area because they support populations of bar-necked cuckoo-doves, pink-headed imperial pigeons, jonquil parrots, streak-breasted honeyeaters, plain gerygones, fawn-breasted whistlers, green figbirds, olive-brown orioles, buff-banded thicketbirds, white-bellied bush chats and flame-breasted sunbirds.

== See also ==
- List of Important Bird Areas in Timor-Leste
