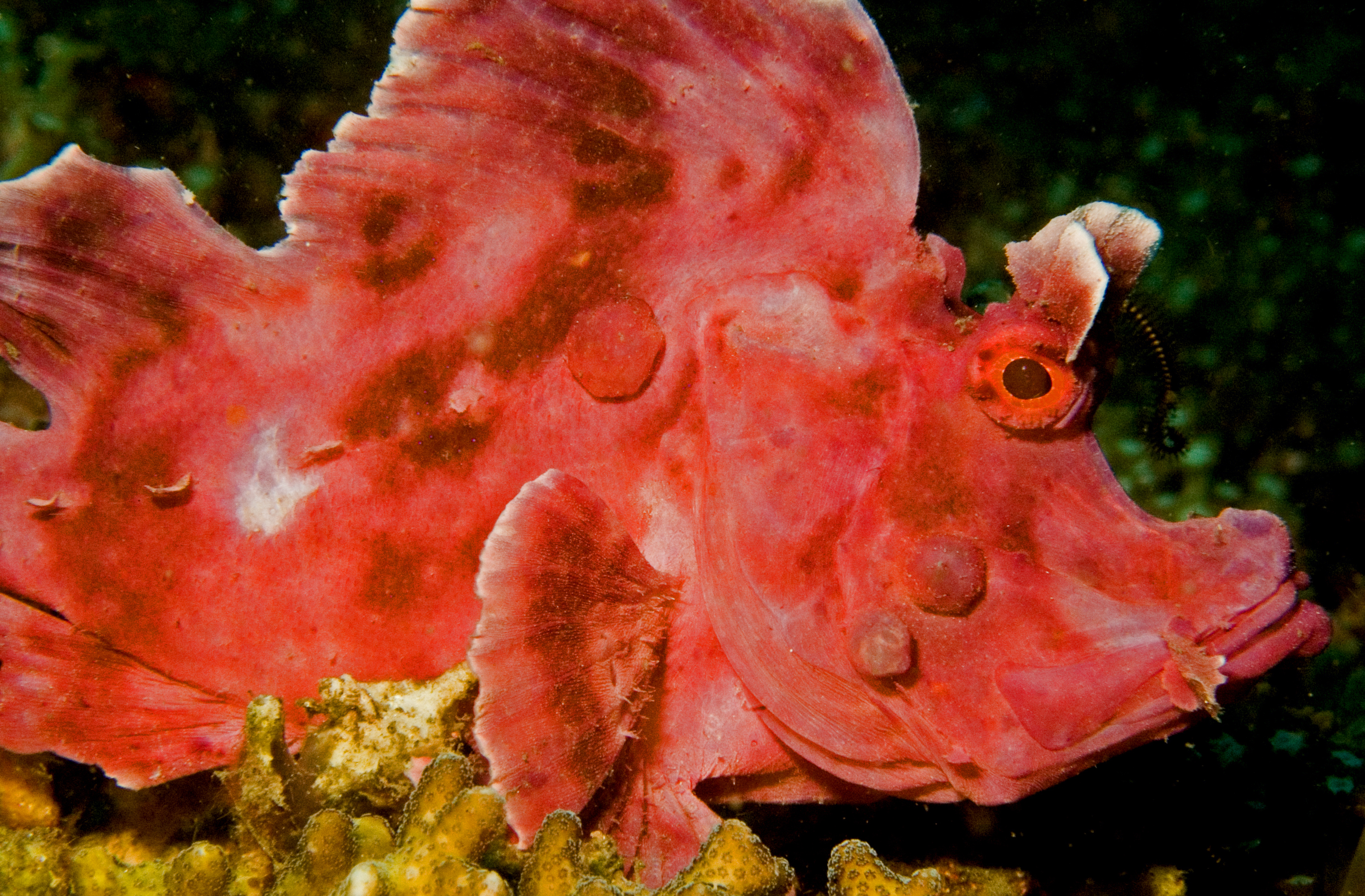

Conservation status
- Least Concern (IUCN 3.1)

Scientific classification
- Kingdom: Animalia
- Phylum: Chordata
- Class: Actinopterygii
- Order: Perciformes
- Family: Scorpaenidae
- Genus: Rhinopias
- Species: R. eschmeyeri

Binomial name
- Rhinopias eschmeyeri Condé, 1977

= Rhinopias eschmeyeri =

Species of fish

Rhinopias eschmeyeri or Eschmeyer's scorpionfish or mauritius scorpionfish, is a species of marine ray-finned fish belonging to the family Scorpaenidae, the scorpionfishes. This species is found in the Indo-West Pacific. It grows to an average size of 16.6 cm in length. It occasionally makes its way into the aquarium trade. Although some have raised questions as to whether R. eschmeyeri is a morphological variant of Rhinopias frondosa rather than a separate species, a 2006 study by Motomura and Johnson confirmed the species' existence and distinguished it from other members of the genus Rhinopias. It is sometimes confused with the leaf scorpionfish.

== Taxonomy ==
Rhinopias eschmeyeri was first formally described in 1977 by the French speleologist and zoologist Bruno Condé with the type locality given as Mahébourg on Mauritius. This species has been seen associating with R. frondosa in pairs and it has been suggested that these are the different sexes in a sexually dimorphic single species. The specific name honours the American ichthyologist William N. Eschmeyer who revised the genus Rhinopias in 1973.

== Description ==
Eschmeyer's scorpionfish has a maximum length of 23 cm (9 in) and its dorsal fin has twelve spines and eight to nine soft rays while the anal fin has three spines and five soft rays.

According to Motomura and Johnson (p. 502), R. eschmeyeri "differs from R. aphanes and R. frondosa in having two tentacles on the underside of the lower jaw (vs. 12-18 tentacles in R. aphanes and 9-24 in R. frondosa), lacking tentacles on the frontal below the eyes in anterior view (vs. 2-4 tentacles present in the two species), lacking distinct tentacles on the lateral surface of the body above the lateral line (vs. present), having short tentacles, without distinct branches along distal margins, on the supraocular and posterior lacrimal spines (vs. long tentacles, with distinct branches) . . . and having head, body, fins, and tentacles usually without distinct pigmentation or markings (vs. with elongate black-margined white markings each with a central region of yellow, green, or brown in R. aphanes and with numerous distinct circular dark-margined spots in R. frondosa)." In the two comparison photos at right, one can observe these differences in the number of tentacles on the underside of the jaw, the presence or absence of tentacles in front below the eyes, and the branched or unbranched form of the tentacles above the eye, as well as the obvious difference in pigmentation and markings.

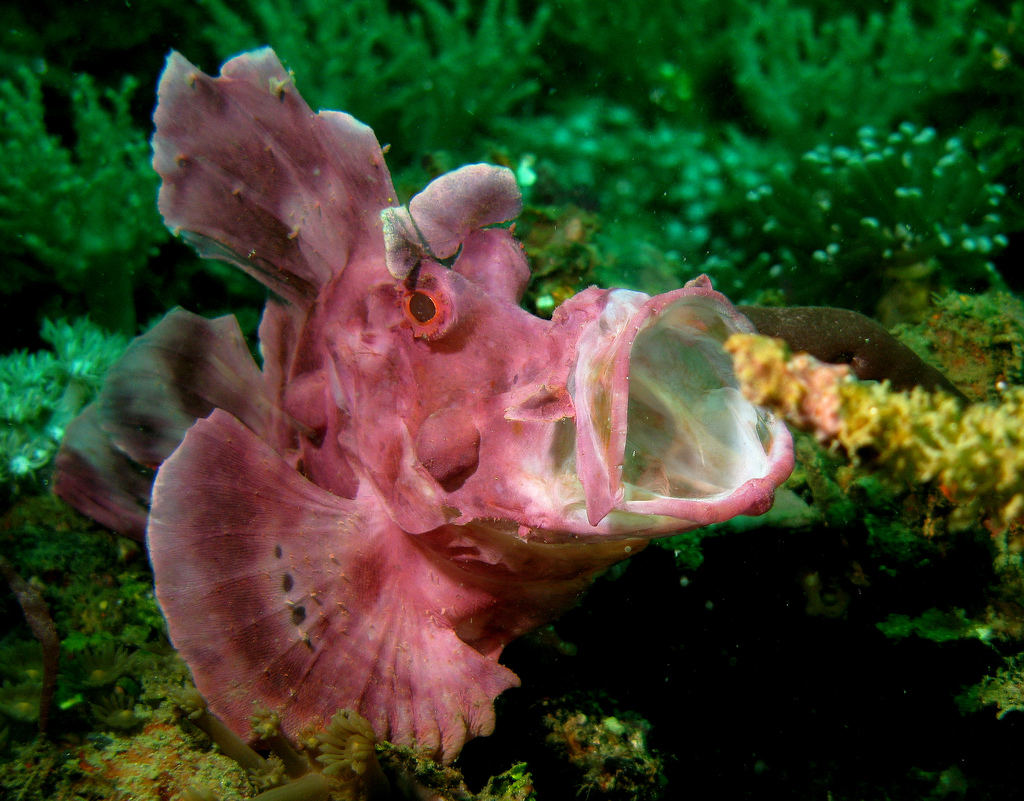
Rhinopias eschmeyeri yawning

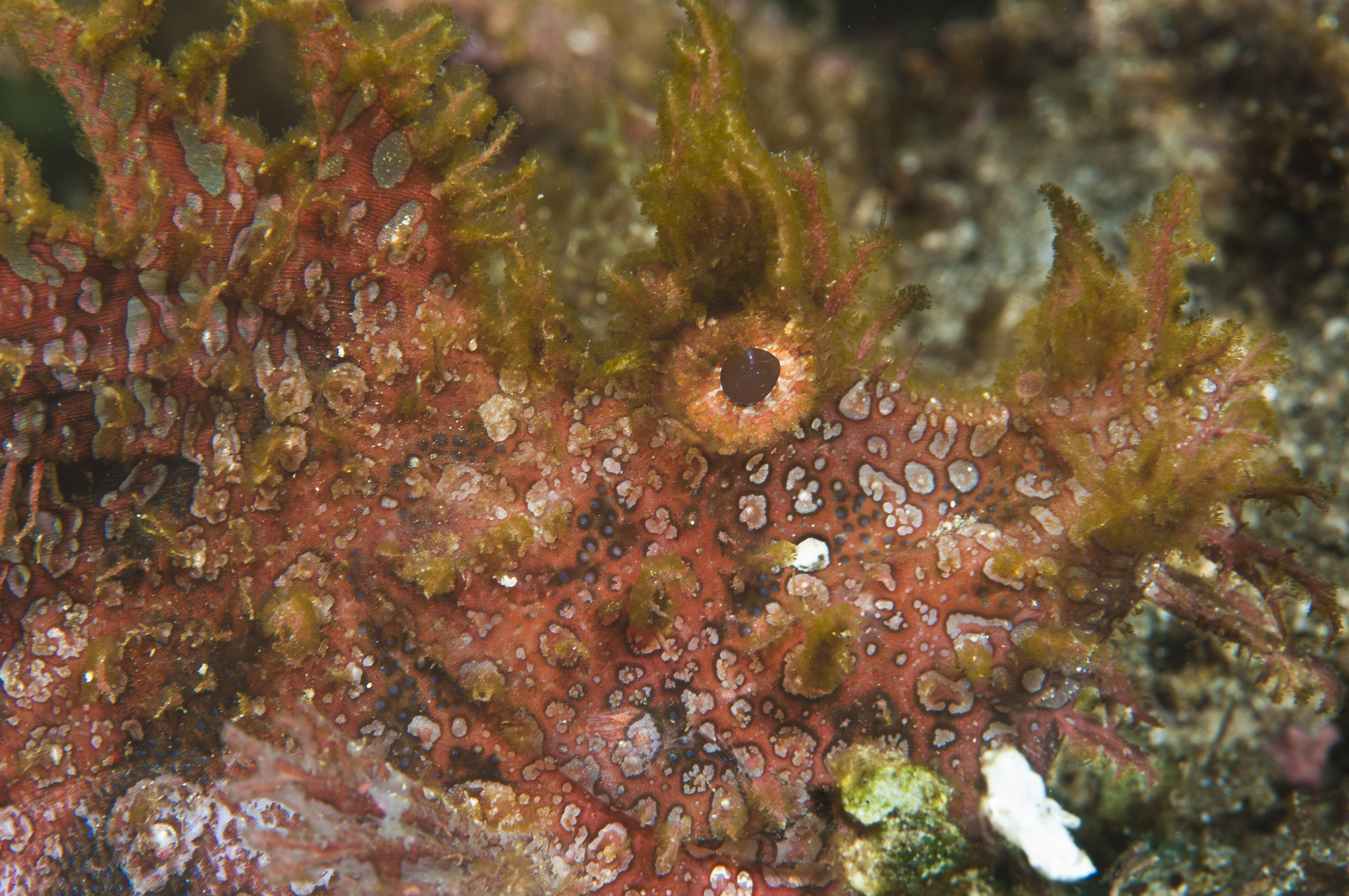
For comparison, a Weedy or Lacey scorpionfish (R. frondosa or R. aphanes)

== Distribution and habitat ==
R. eschmeyeri was thought to be endemic to Mauritius, but populations were found in the tropical western Indo-Pacific. Its range extends from the coasts of East Africa to Japan, Indonesia and the northern half of Australia. Its depth range is 18 to 55 m (59 to 180 ft) and it is usually found on coral reefs or rubble seabeds.

== Utilisation ==
Rhinopias eschmeyeri is a popular aquarium fish, numbers are collected from Southeast Asian waters for export to Japan from where they enter international aquarium fish trade.

== See also ==
- List of marine aquarium fish species
