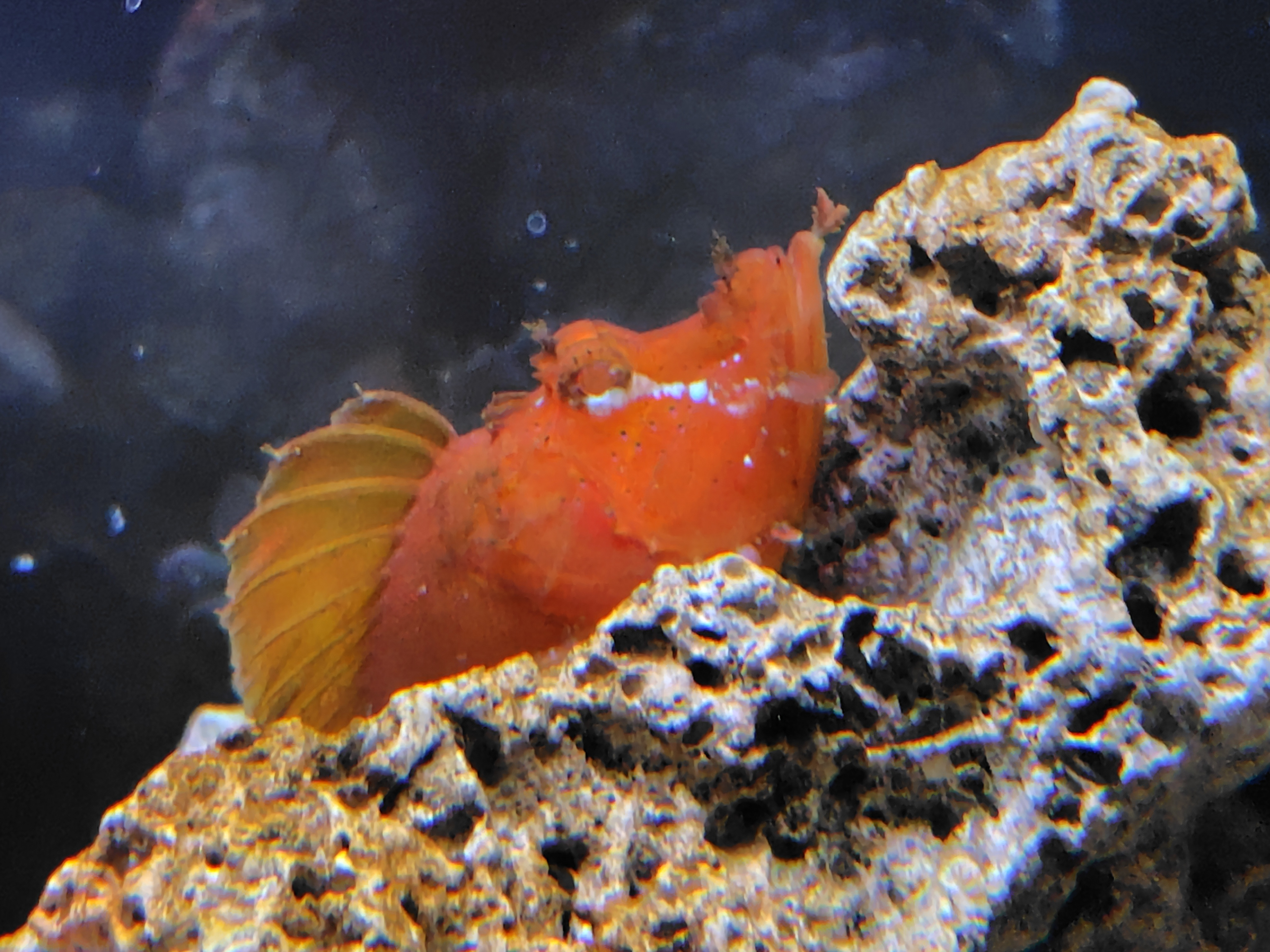

Scientific classification
- Kingdom: Animalia
- Phylum: Chordata
- Class: Actinopterygii
- Order: Perciformes
- Family: Scorpaenidae
- Genus: Rhinopias
- Species: R. argoliba

Binomial name
- Rhinopias argoliba Eschmeyer, Hirosake & T. Abe, 1973

= Rhinopias argoliba =

Species of fish

Rhinopias argoliba, the argoliba scorpionfish or Japanese scorpionfish, is a species of marine ray-finned fish belonging to the family Scorpaenidae, the scorpionfishes. This species is found in the Western Pacific.

== Taxonomy ==
Rhinopias argoliba was first formally described in 1973 by William N. Eschmeyer, Yoshitsugu Hirosake and Tokiharu Abe with the type locality given as off Izu Ocean Park in Sagami Bay in Japan. The specific name argoliba is a compound of argos which means "white" and libos meaning "tear" or "drop", an allusion to the milky-white teardrop shaped marking underneath its eye.

== Description ==
Rhinopias argoliba has an overall reddish colour with a white teardrop shaped marking below the eye, extending from the eye to the rear of the upper jaw. There is also a white spot on the upper flank above the posterior margin of the pectoral fin. Compared to its congeners this species has a low dorsal fin and fewer flaps and tentacles on its skin. There are 18 fin rays in the pectoral fins. This species attains a maximum total length of 15 cm (5.9 in).

== Distribution and habitat ==
Rhinopias argoliba has a rather disparate known distribution in the western Pacific. It was originally only recorded from southern Japan, its type locality, but more recently it has been found in the Coral Sea off Australia. This is a demersal species found in rocky habitats.

== Biology ==
Rhinopias argoliba, like other scorpionfishes, is predatory, feeding on small fishes and crustaceans. They tend to move by walking on the substrate using their pectoral fins as if they were hands.
