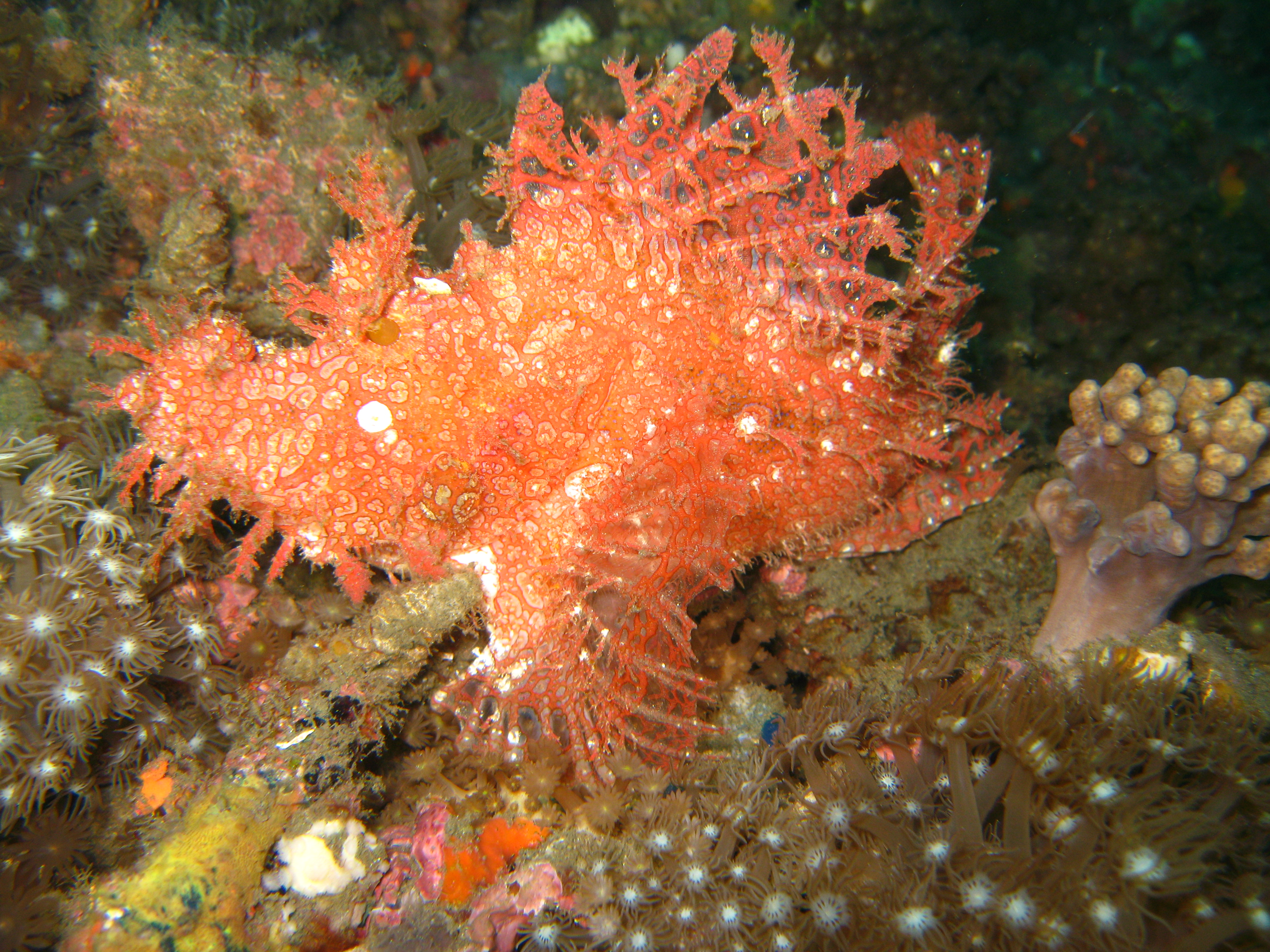

Conservation status
- Least Concern (IUCN 3.1)

Scientific classification
- Kingdom: Animalia
- Phylum: Chordata
- Class: Actinopterygii
- Order: Perciformes
- Family: Scorpaenidae
- Genus: Rhinopias
- Species: R. frondosa

Binomial name
- Rhinopias frondosa (Günther, 1892)

Synonyms
- Scorpaena frondosa Günther, 1892

= Rhinopias frondosa =

Species of fish

Rhinopias frondosa, the weedy scorpionfish or the weed fish, is a species of marine ray-finned fish belonging to the family Scorpaenidae, the scorpionfishes. This species is found in the Indo-West Pacific. It is a rare but highly desirable fish in the aquarium trade.

== Taxonomy ==
Rhinopias frondosa was first formally described in 1892 by the German-born British zoologist Albert Günther with the type locality given as Mauritius. When Theodore Gill described the new monotypic genus Rhinopias in 1905 he designated this species as its type species. This species has been seen associating with R. eschmeyeri in pairs and it has been suggested that these are the different sexes in a sexually dimorphic single species. The specific name frondosa means "branched or full of leaves", an allusion to the fleshy tentacles which cover most of the body of this fish.

== Description ==
Rhinopias frondosa has a highly compressed body which is covered in weed like tentacles. It has 12 spines and 9 soft rays in its dorsal fin and 3 spines and 5 soft rays in its anal fin. The soft-rayed part of the dorsal fin has two small black spots that have a diameter smaller than that of the orbit. There are fleshy tentacles on the supraocular and posterior lacrimal spines. The distal margins of the soft-rayed parts of the dorsal, pelvic, anal and caudal fins have either no notches or they are rather weakly notched. The tip of each fin ray in the caudal fin is divided into four branches. The spines of the dorsal fin are relatively flexible and have tips which bend easily under even the slightest pressure. The lateral surface of the lacrimal bone is typically smooth or has a bump and the suborbital ridge normally has 3 bumps. There are between 9 and 24 tentacles on the lower jaw, there are tentacles below the eyes and the flanks are covered in tentacles. The fin membranes on the spiny part of the dorsal fin have clear incisions. The colour of this species is very variable but they all have distinctive markings of numerous distinct circular dark-margined spots with the spot in the middle being the same colour as the background colour. This species attains a maximum known total length of 23 cm (9.1 in).

== Distribution ==
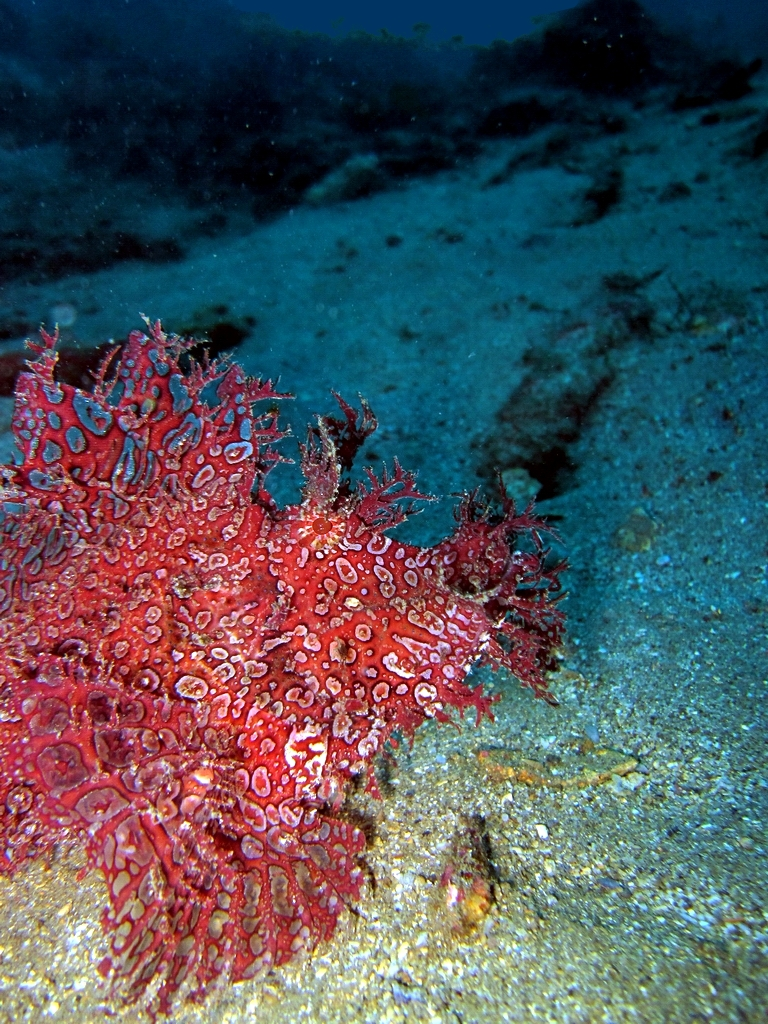

The weedy scorpionfish lives in the Indian Ocean and Western Pacific Ocean, from Japan to Australia and from South Africa to the Caroline Islands. They are found in depths ranging from 13 to 90 meters.

== Feeding and behaviour ==
Like most Scorpaenidae, weedy scorpionfish are mostly nocturnal ambush hunters, using their camouflage to prey on unsuspecting fish and invertebrates. They rarely swim, but rather move along the bottom propelling themselves with their fins.

== In aquarium ==
The weedy scorpionfish has no commercial value for fisheries, but commands a high price in the aquarium trade. Although they can be found in Eastern waters, they are mostly exported to the west where they fetch a high price due to the difficulty of identifying them in the wild and their issues with contracting diseases from live feeder options as it is extremely difficult to wean them onto prepared food. Rhinopias are highly sought after by aquarists who collect rare and unusual species. Newly introduced specimen have also been known to change colors if a group of rhinopias are already present in a different color.

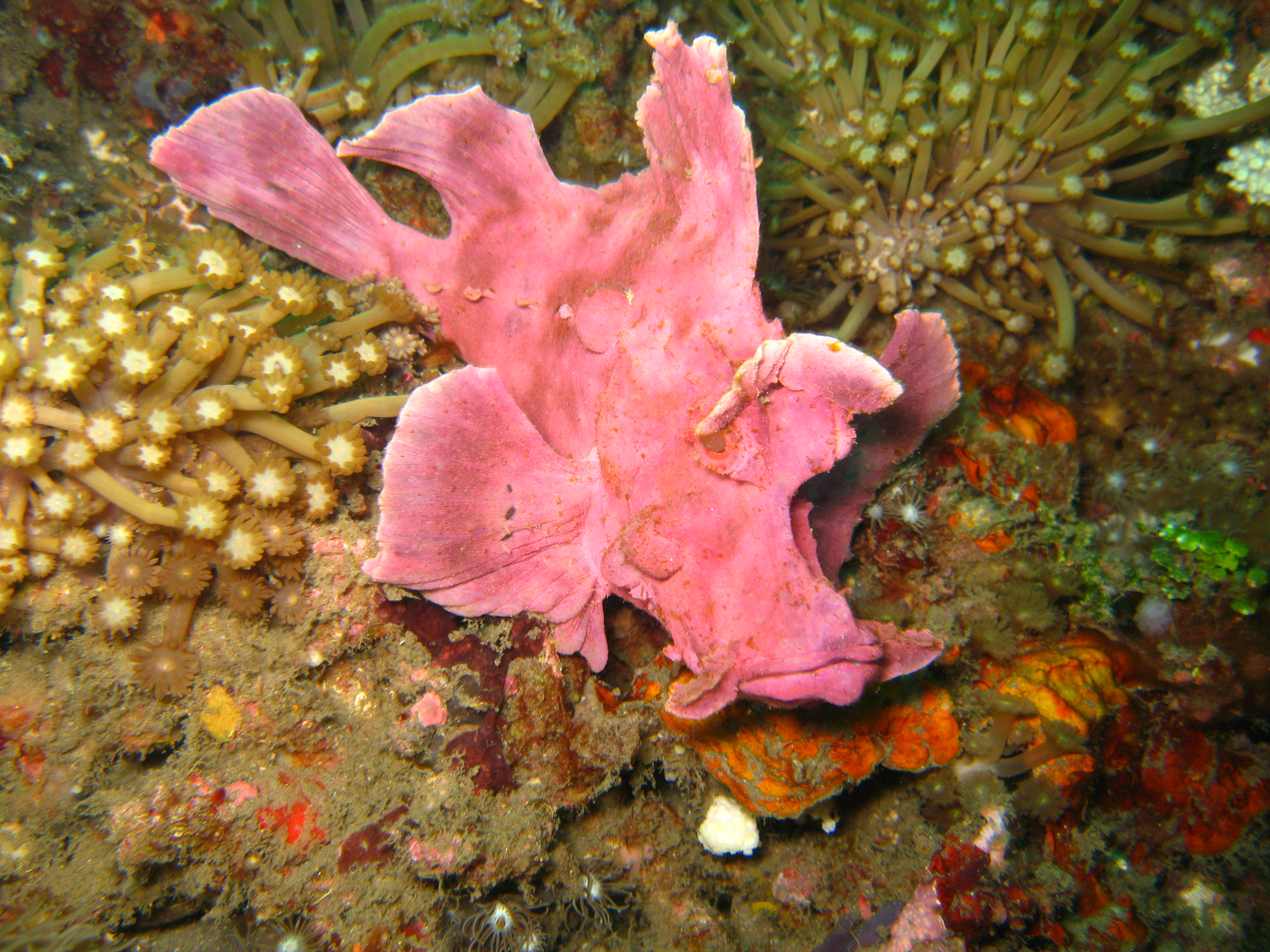
For comparison, a specimen of the related species Rhinopias eschmeyeri.
