= Comoro River =

River in Timor-Leste

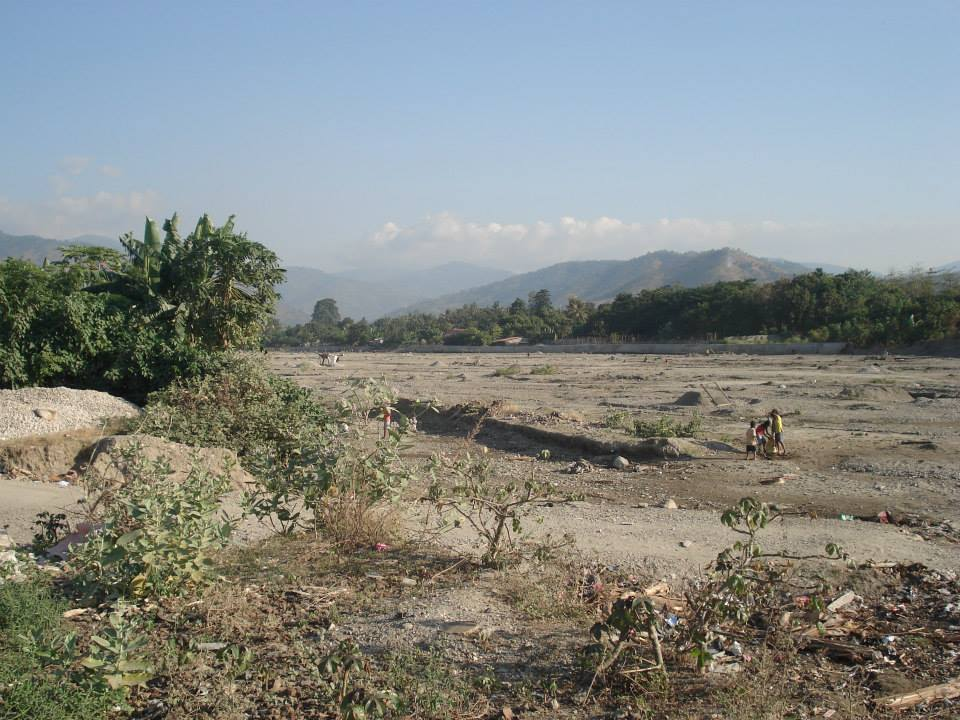
- The river in Bebonuk during the dry season

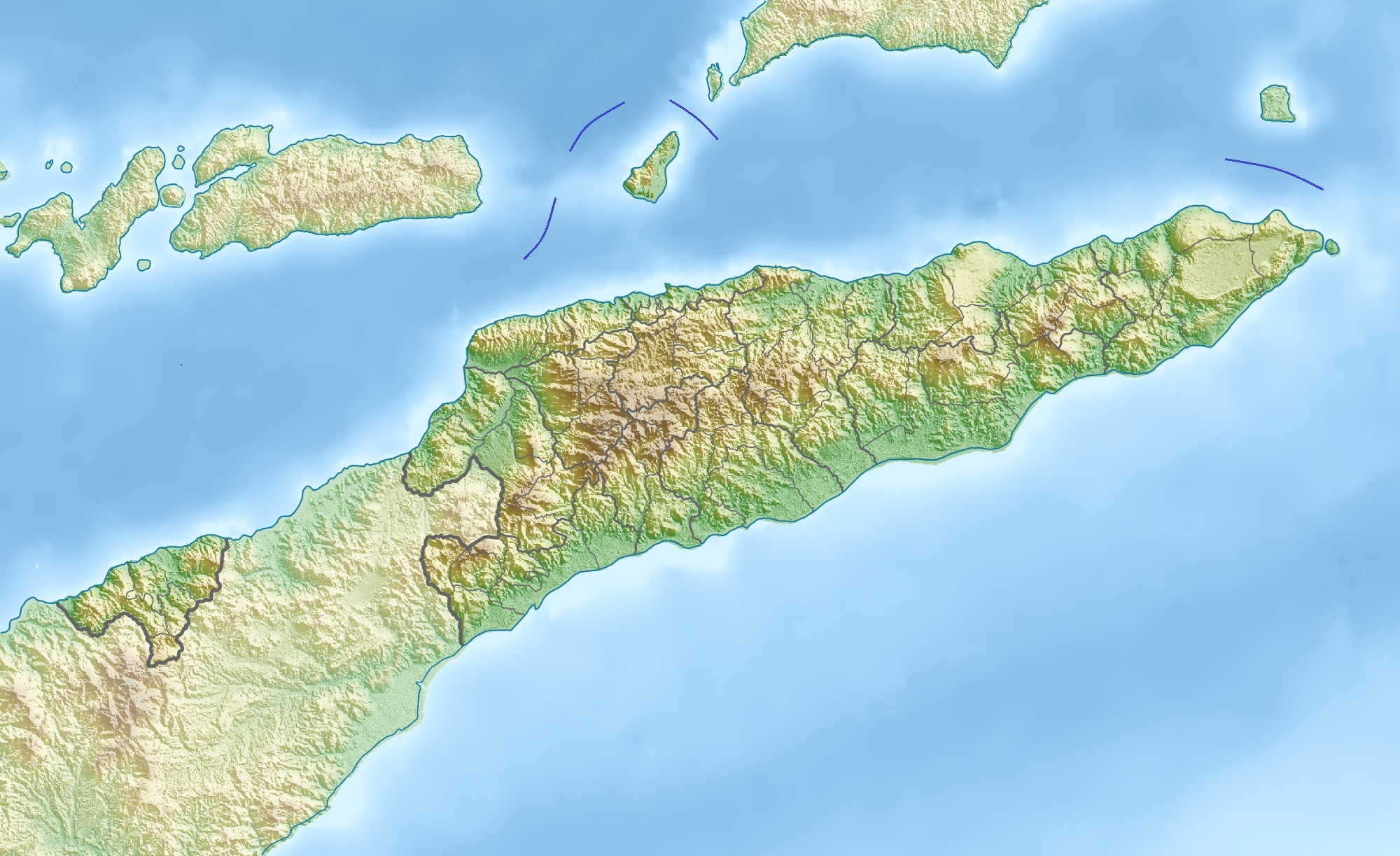
- Location of river mouth
- Native name: Ribeira de Comoro /; Rio Comoro (Portuguese); Mota Komoro (Tetum)

Location
- Country: Timor-Leste
- Municipalities: Dili; Aileu; Ermera; Liquiçá

Physical characteristics
- Mouth: Ombai Strait
  - location: Madohi / Bebonuk
  - coordinates: 8°32′17″S 125°32′4″E
- Basin size: 300 km^{2} (120 sq mi)
- Discharge
  - average: 2.99 m^{3}/s (6,300 cu ft/min)
  - minimum: <0.5 m^{3}/s (1,100 cu ft/min) (Jul–Nov)
  - maximum: 12.3 m^{3}/s (26,000 cu ft/min) (March)

Basin features
- Tributaries
  - left: Anggou River
  - right: Buamara/Boera River, Maulu River, Bemos River
- Bridges: Hinode Bridge; CPLP Bridge

The Comoro River (Portuguese: Ribeira de Comoro or Rio Comoro, Tetum: Mota Komoro) is a river in Timor-Leste. It flows northwards into Ombai Strait, reaching the coast in the north western suburbs of the capital, Dili. In its lower reaches, it is the main and largest of Dili's four major rivers.

== Course ==
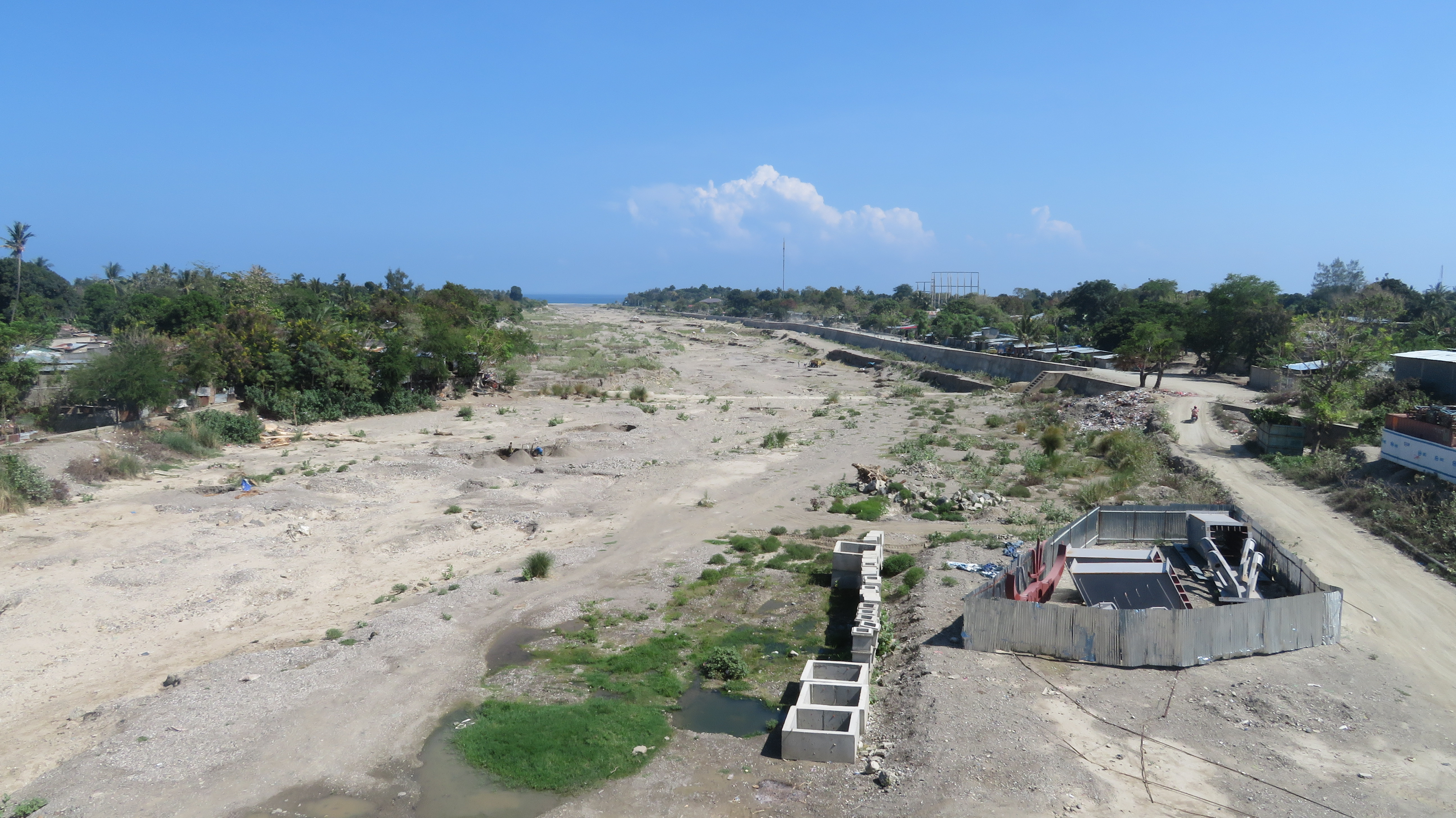
The river north of the CPLP Bridge

The headwaters of the river are in Timor-Leste's central mountains south of Dili. From there, the river flows northeastwards to the southern edge of Dili's southwestern suburbs. It then turns northwards and heads through Dili's western suburbs, initially along the border between the municipalities of Dili and Liquiçá, and then by traversing the Dom Aleixo administrative post in Dili municipality, where it passes under the Hinode Bridge and, 800 m (2,600 ft) further downstream, the CPLP Bridge.

In its lower reaches, the river is the main and largest of Dili's four major rivers, and is very wide, with steep banks. It has a bed of stone and gravel, is mostly dry, and is often braided when not either dry or in flood. A short distance north of the CPLP Bridge, it flows into Ombai Strait; between the bridge and its mouth, it marks the border between the sucos of Madohi (to its west) and Bebonuk (to its east).

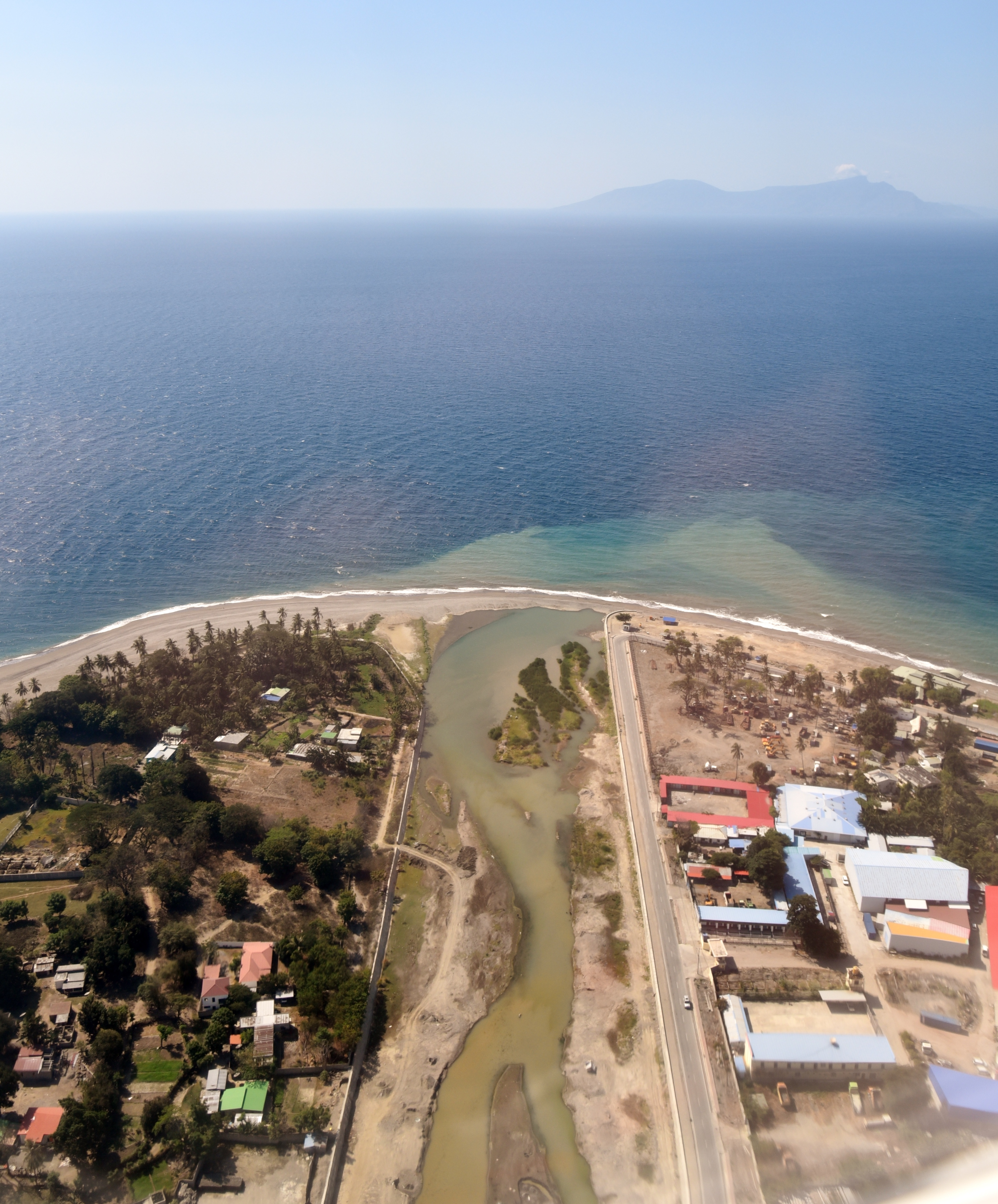
The river mouth in 2023, with Ombai Strait and Atauro island in the background

The river mouth is flat and wide. When the river is flowing, the mouth commonly has multiple, shallow, tidally influenced channels with low to moderate flow. Immediately to the west of the mouth is Presidente Nicolau Lobato International Airport, and to its east is the Bay of Dili, of which it is the western end. The river mouth flows into an area containing a coral reef.

The river abuts the eastern end of the airport runway, and the possibility of bridging the river or diverting it to facilitate an eastern extension to the runway has been raised. However, various proposals to construct such an extension were rejected by the government in 2019.

During Timor-Leste's rainy season, the river's lower reaches are prone to flooding and consequent damage to infrastructure and housing. In general, the riverbanks are protected by concrete or gabion walls, but have deteriorated by scouring, as the channels are not properly maintained.

The river has four tributaries. In order of entrance, they are as follows:

- Anggou River: rises in Liquiçá municipality; flows about 8 km (5.0 mi) southeastwards and then northeastwards to the village of Railaco in Ermera municipality;
- Buamara/Boera River: rises as the Buamara River in Ermera municipality; flows about 10 km (6.2 mi), initially northwestwards, and then northeastwards as the Boera River, to merge with the Anggou River at Railaco and form the Balele or Hare River;
- Maulu River: rises in Ermera municipality; flows about 8 km (5.0 mi) westwards to enter the Balele/Hare River about 3 km (1.9 mi) east and downstream of Railaco (the Balele/Hare River becomes the Comoro River further downstream);
- Bemos River: rises in Aileu municipality; flows about 13 km (8.1 mi) westwards into the Comoro River, about 8 km (5.0 mi) northeast and downstream of where the Maulu River flows into the Balele/Hare River, and about 8 km (5.0 mi) south and upstream of the Comoro River's mouth.

A minor tributary, sometimes referred to as the Berloi River or the Berloi-Fatisi River, rises in Aileu municipality and passes over the Berloi Waterfall in Fatisi, Aileu. It then continues for about a further 3 km (1.9 mi), until it flows into the main river some 5 km (3.1 mi) downstream of Railaco (near both the point where the Balele/Hare River becomes the Comoro River, and the tripoint between Aileu, Ermera, and Liquiçá municipalities).

== History ==
Both before and since Timor-Leste resumed independence in 2002, the river's flood-prone channels in Dili have been improved and provided with revetments or riverbank protection. The improvements have been assessed as having a capacity to convey flood waters over a 25-year flood.

In April 2005, the Ministry of Agriculture, Fisheries, and Forestry appointed the Japan International Cooperation Agency (JICA) to develop a community-based integrated watershed management plan for the Laclo and Comoro River basins. JICA provided its report to the Ministry in March 2010.

A substantial flood of the river in 2010 was reported to have affected 2,467 people. In 2011, the Timor-Leste government allocated about US$1.75 million to rehabilitation and maintenance of the river course in Dili. Between 2010 and 2012, the government also cooperated with the government of Victoria, Australia, to develop a master plan for drainage in Dili. Amongst other things, the plan proposed the construction of a flood control reservoir upstream of Dili to reduce the peak flow at the river mouth over a 50-year return period.

Also in 2012, construction began on the first of a pair of new road bridges, since named the CPLP Bridge, to replace the only existing bridge over the river. The following year, 2013, a further substantial flood reportedly affected 667 people. The first of the CPLP Bridge pairs was completed in May 2013, and the second was built between October 2013 and May 2014.

Meanwhile, in February 2014 a preparatory survey team engaged by the Japan International Cooperation Agency (JICA) proposed the installation of an additional road bridge 800 m (2,600 ft) upstream of the CPLP Bridge. Work on that bridge, since named the Hinode Bridge, began in mid 2016, and the completed structure was opened to traffic in September 2018.

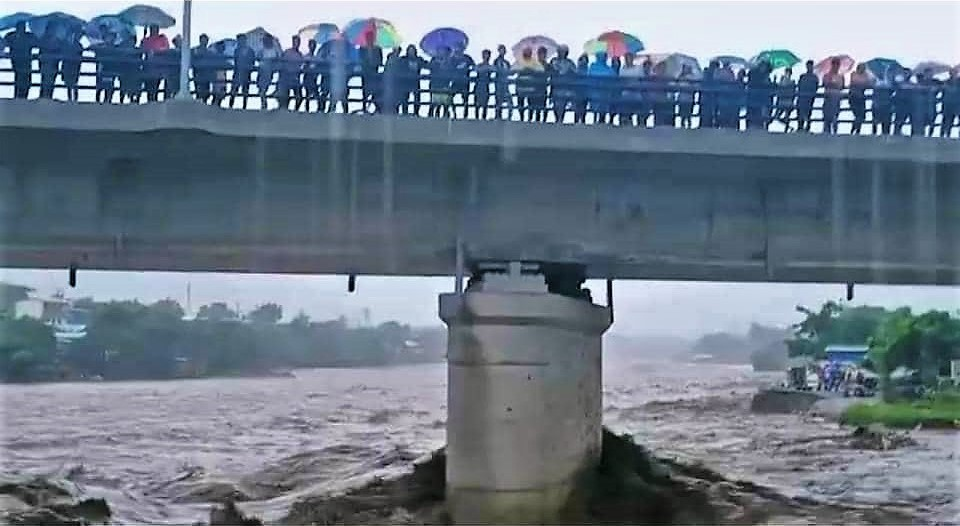
The Hinode Bridge during the Cyclone Seroja flood in April 2021

A 2017 study investigated the impact of floods and proposed countermeasures in the Comoro basin. The outcome of the study's hydrologic analysis was that the river was wide enough to flow its peak discharges under a 50-year return period. The report of the study recommended that existing countermeasures against flooding be strengthened by flood control, e.g. construction of an upstream check dam for sediment control and rehabilitation of the downstream levees, to mitigate flood risk.

In March 2019, the government urged more than 100 families living in unauthorised housing within 50 m (160 ft) of the river to relocate "immediately", after flood water from heavy rains had destroyed seven houses on the riverbank the previous week. At the end of that year, 11 more houses were said to have been washed away in the suco of Manleuana. Authorities then said that more than 200 homes built along the river were at risk of flooding, and repeated earlier calls for householders to move out. In April 2021, further flooding of the river triggered by Cyclone Seroja caused additional houses to be washed away.

According to the United Nations Office for Disaster Risk Reduction (UNDRR), the Cyclone Seroja flooding affected 13 municipalities and 30,322 households throughout Timor-Leste, destroyed 4,212 houses, took 34 lives, and was "... said to be the worst the country has seen in 50 years ...". The Timor-Leste country coordinator for the Australian Humanitarian Partnership consortium said that it was "anything but typical". The country manager of Australian People for Health, Education and Development Abroad (APHEDA) attributed it to the obstruction of waterways by housing erected along them. She said that such housing blocks water canals, and that the government needed to enforce the country's pre-independence rule against building within 100 m (330 ft) of bodies of water.

== Catchment ==
The river's catchment or drainage basin is one of the 10 major catchments in Timor-Leste. It has a total area of approximately 30,000 ha or 300 km^{2} (120 sq mi), and extends over four municipalities, namely Dili, Aileu, Ermera, and Liquiçá. Excluding Dili's urban zone, it is 212 km^{2} (82 sq mi) in area, with the four tributaries.

Timor-Leste has been broadly divided into twelve 'hydrologic units', groupings of climatologically and physiographically similar and adjacent river catchments. The Comoro River catchment is one of the two major catchments in the Laclo hydrologic unit, which is about 2,031 km^{2} (784 sq mi) in total area, and covers 13.6% of the country; the other one is the catchment of the North Laclo River.

Upstream of Dili's urban zone, the Comoro River catchment is formed by two valleys surrounded by steep mountains. The main upstream valley is bordered by mountains of 1,000–1,300 m (3,300–4,300 ft) elevation to the south and 700–800 m (2,300–2,600 ft) high to the north. Railaco Valley, formed by the Anggou and Boera Rivers, has an elevation of 450–650 m (1,480–2,130 ft), while the mountain near Bazartete is 920 m (3,020 ft) high.

Overall, the elevation of the catchment ranges from 1,410 m (4,630 ft) AMSL at its highest point to sea level at the river's mouth. About half the catchment is classified as being lands of between 15% and 40% slopes, and about one quarter has more than 40% slopes.

The catchment system is composed mainly of sandy soil with a relatively high infiltration capacity. According to a 2011 groundwater study, 60% of the river flows in the upper reaches of the river are diverted to an underground river system; eventually, the diverted flows recharge the groundwater body in Caicoli, central Dili.

There has been forest degradation in the catchment, mainly due to illegal cutting, firewood collection, wild fires and cattle grazing.

All of Timor-Leste's catchments are exposed to a monsoon type climate, with a clear distinction between just two seasons, rainy and dry. The upper Comoro catchment has a relatively short dry season (5–6 months), and an annual precipitation of around 1,500 mm (59 in) at Aileu, its southernmost point; the northwestern, coastal, part of the catchment has a lower precipitation (500–1,000 mm (20–39 in) annually). The lower reaches of the river that are often braided carry low flow during the dry season. The mean monthly discharge of the river as a whole is 2.99 m^{3}/s (6,300 cu ft/min); it decreases to less than 0.5 m^{3}/s (1,100 cu ft/min) from July to November, and rises to 12.3 m^{3}/s (26,000 cu ft/min) in March.

== Geology ==
The catchment's parent materials are phyllite from its upper reaches. Phyllites in the catchment (between the central mountains at an elevation of about 1,000 m (3,300 ft) AMSL and the river mouth at sea level) are somewhat geologically fragile, and are easily eroded on being exposed to air after surface soil removal.

== Economy ==
=== Agriculture ===
Farming in the catchment focuses on the production of maize, along with lowland rice, cassava, other tubers, vegetables, and beans. Shifting cultivation is common. The vegetable types produced include mustard, cabbage, tomato, pumpkin, carrot, cucumber, snow pea, and spinach. Especially in Ermera, coffee beans are another important crop, although yields were very low as of the end of the 2010s, due to poor maintenance of coffee and shade trees. Fruits were produced on a small scale, and there were some industrial/tree crops, such as palm tree, candlenut, and coconut, also on a small scale.

Other sources of income and wealth for rural households in Timor-Leste include the raising of livestock. In the 2010s, about 6,900 head of cattle and buffalo were being raised within the catchment. The major rearing practice was one-day grazing on native grasses in rangelands. Animal feed was scarce during the dry season, especially towards its end. Partially deteriorated pastures on steep and fragile slopes were common. Additionally, Siam weed (Chromolaena odorata), a species poisonous to cattle, had invaded the catchment and reduced the availability of land viable for grazing.

=== City water supply ===
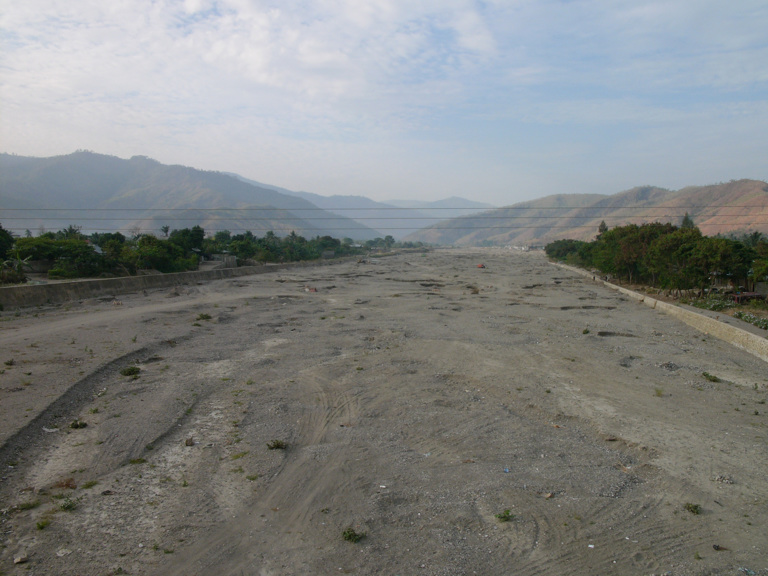
The Dili suburban alluvial reaches of the river during the dry season

The supply of water to Dili is the most important use of the water in the catchment.

The Bemos River supplies industrial, drinking and domestic water to large parts of Dili, including drinking and domestic water to about 30% of the city's total population. The Bemos River water is taken from upstream of the confluence of the Bemos and Comoro Rivers, and passes through a raw water main to the Dili central water treatment plant. There is another water supply intake in the Maulu River.

Further supplies of water are obtained and distributed in the form of groundwater extracted from five bore holes in a large aquifer, the Dili Groundwater Basis (DGB), which is in the lower reaches of the catchment and formed from quaternary sedimentary deposits in the Dili alluvial plain.

In 2011, limited transient electromagnetic soundings were acquired of the catchment's aquifer at eight sites in the middle of the Comoro River, ranging from just upstream of the Comoro/Bemos confluence down to the mouth of the Comoro. The soundings suggested that the aquifer contained relatively good quality groundwater, presumably because it was being recharged from within the catchment during the monsoon season and remained fresh as a result of high recharge. However, more recent studies have concluded that development activities in the catchment area were placing stress on the aquifer by limiting the recharge. In particular, increasing extraction of groundwater had led to saltwater intrusion.

=== Fishing ===
In Timor-Leste, involvement in fishing is low by comparison with other small island countries. Along the north coast of Timor, including near the mouth of the Comoro River, fishing levels are higher than elsewhere in the country, other than in pockets along parts of the south coast. Many of the north coast fishers fish part time or seasonally, and are otherwise occupied in additional activities such as carpentry, labouring or security work. Most of their fish landings are of small pelagic species, including short-bodied mackerel, sardines (Clupeidae), halfbeaks and scads (Carangidae).

A 2021 study focused in particular upon two north coast fishing sites, one of them being the fishery near the Comoro River mouth. It concluded that a number of species of sardines (and also other small pelagic fish) were caught in that fishery. Catches of these pelagic species varied moderately between years, and were larger during the rainy season and when medium-sized turbid plumes were extending from the river mouth. Fishers generally perceived a decline in landings over the previous 20 years. They attributed the decline to several human factors, including higher fishing effort, plastic pollution, motorisation of canoes and larger-scale, less selective fishing gear. Some sardine species were sold readily to traders; others were commonly kept for immediate home consumption.

=== Gravel and sand mining ===
In the lower reaches of the river, which have large and thick alluvium deposits, there is active small-scale artisanal mining excavation of gravel and sand. In 2017, over one billion tonnes (980 million long tons; 1.1 billion short tons) of gravel and sands were extracted in Timor-Leste for construction material, but the production amount from the Comoro River was not officially announced.

A report of a 2016 study of the Dili Urban Master Plan asserted that the gravel and sand mining in the Comoro River has an adverse effect on the downstream riverbanks, and suggested that the mining activity be controlled. As of 2019, one hundred people or more were involved in the gravel and sand mining, and a report on the upgrading of the runway at Dili airport recommended that mining activities be licensed by Autoridade Nacional do Petróleo e Minerais (ANPM), the responsible government authority. The report also asserted that the sand and gravel mining was considered to be the cause of increased turbidity, suspended solids and other pollutants in the river water.

== See also ==
- List of rivers of Timor-Leste
