= Berloi Waterfall =

Waterfall in East Timor

- Cascata de Berloi (Portuguese); Be Tuda Berloi (Tetum)
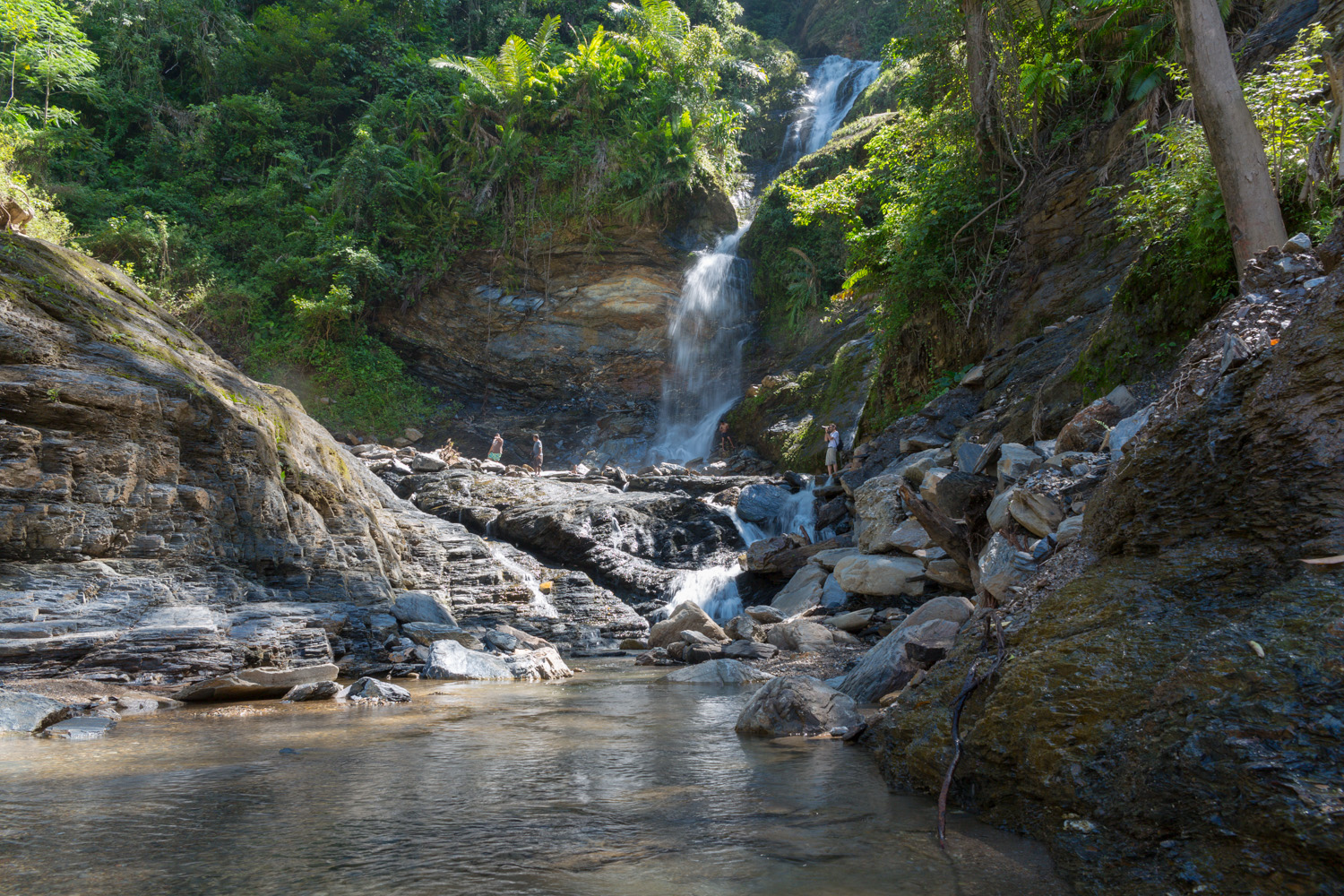
- The waterfall in March 2016

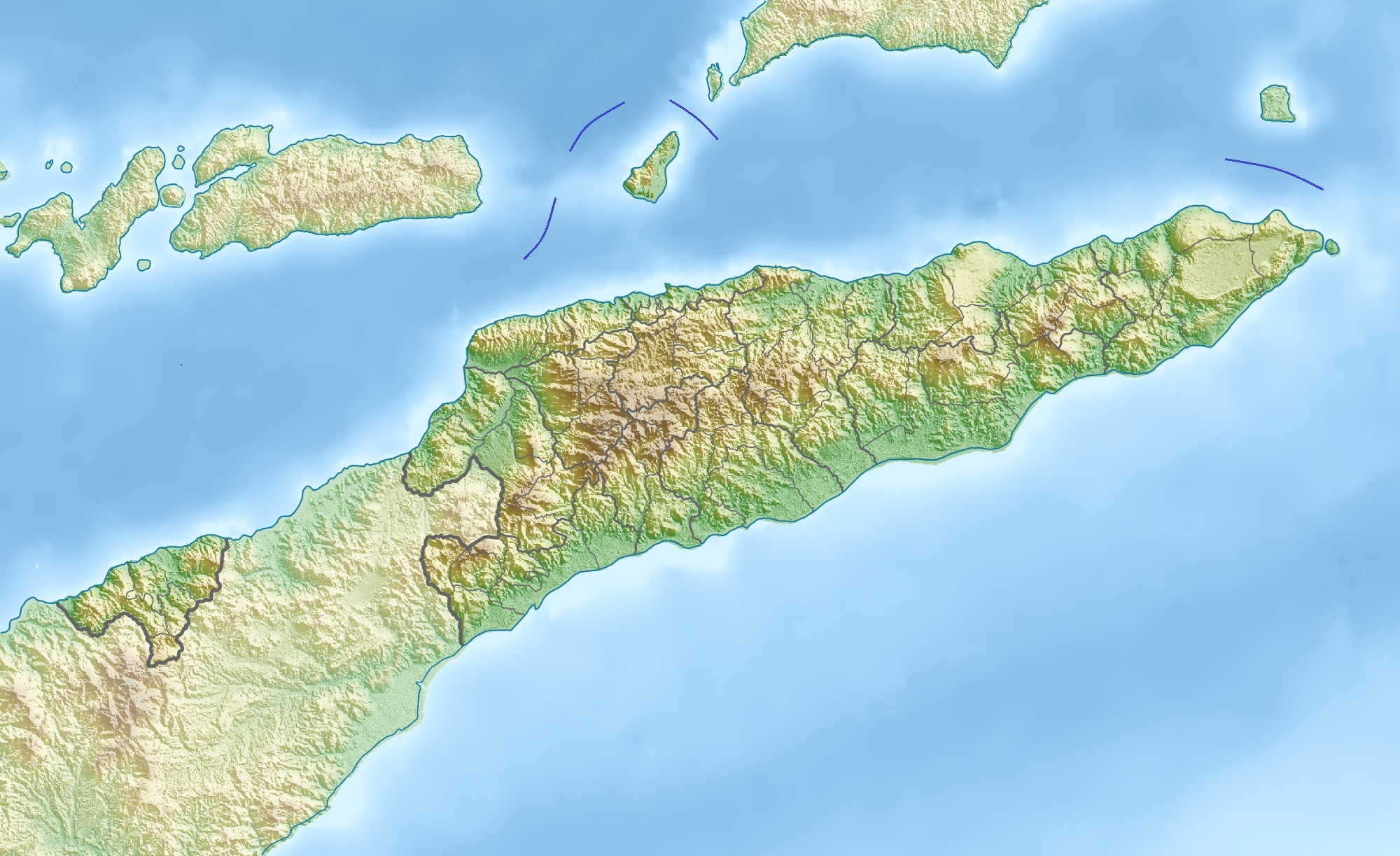
- Location within East Timor
- Location: Fatisi, Laulara, Aileu, Timor-Leste
- Coordinates: 8°38′43″S 125°31′30″E
- Elevation: c. 541–545 m (1,775–1,788 ft) AMSL
- Watercourse: Berloi / Berloi-Fatisi River

The Berloi Waterfall (Portuguese: Cascata de Berloi, Tetum: Be Tuda Berloi) is a small waterfall in the municipality of Aileu, Timor-Leste. It forms part of a minor tributary of the Comoro River.

== Geography ==
The waterfall is located within the suco of Fatisi and the Laulara administrative post in the Aileu municipality, a short distance from Dili, the capital city. The stream that passes over the waterfall is sometimes referred to as the Berloi River or the Berloi-Fatisi River, and is a minor tributary of the Comoro River.

From the base of the waterfall, the stream flows initially in a southwesterly direction for a short distance. It then turns northwest to mark the border between the municipalities of Aileu and Ermera for about 3 km (1.9 mi), until it flows into the Comoro River about 5 km (3.1 mi) downstream of the village of Railaco.

== History ==
On 19 August 1975, during the East Timorese Civil War, a member of Unetim, the Fretilin youth wing, killed a man who was being detained by Fretilin at the detention centre in Unmenlau, in the then sub-district of Laulara. His body was thrown into the stream near the waterfall. The following day, 20 August 1975, a group of eight men, who were being detained by Fretilin in Fatisi on suspicion of being spies for the Timorese Democratic Union (Portuguese: União Democrática Timorense (UDT)), were taken outside. Five of them were killed at the stream, and the remaining three were killed near Fatisi.

== Ecology ==
The waterfall is a habitat, and has been a site for observation and recording, of both rare and abundant species of dragonfly.

== See also ==
- Bandeira Waterfall
- List of waterfalls
