= CPLP Bridge =

Road bridge over the Comoro River

CPLP Bridge Ponte CPLP (Portuguese) Ponte CPLP (Tetum)
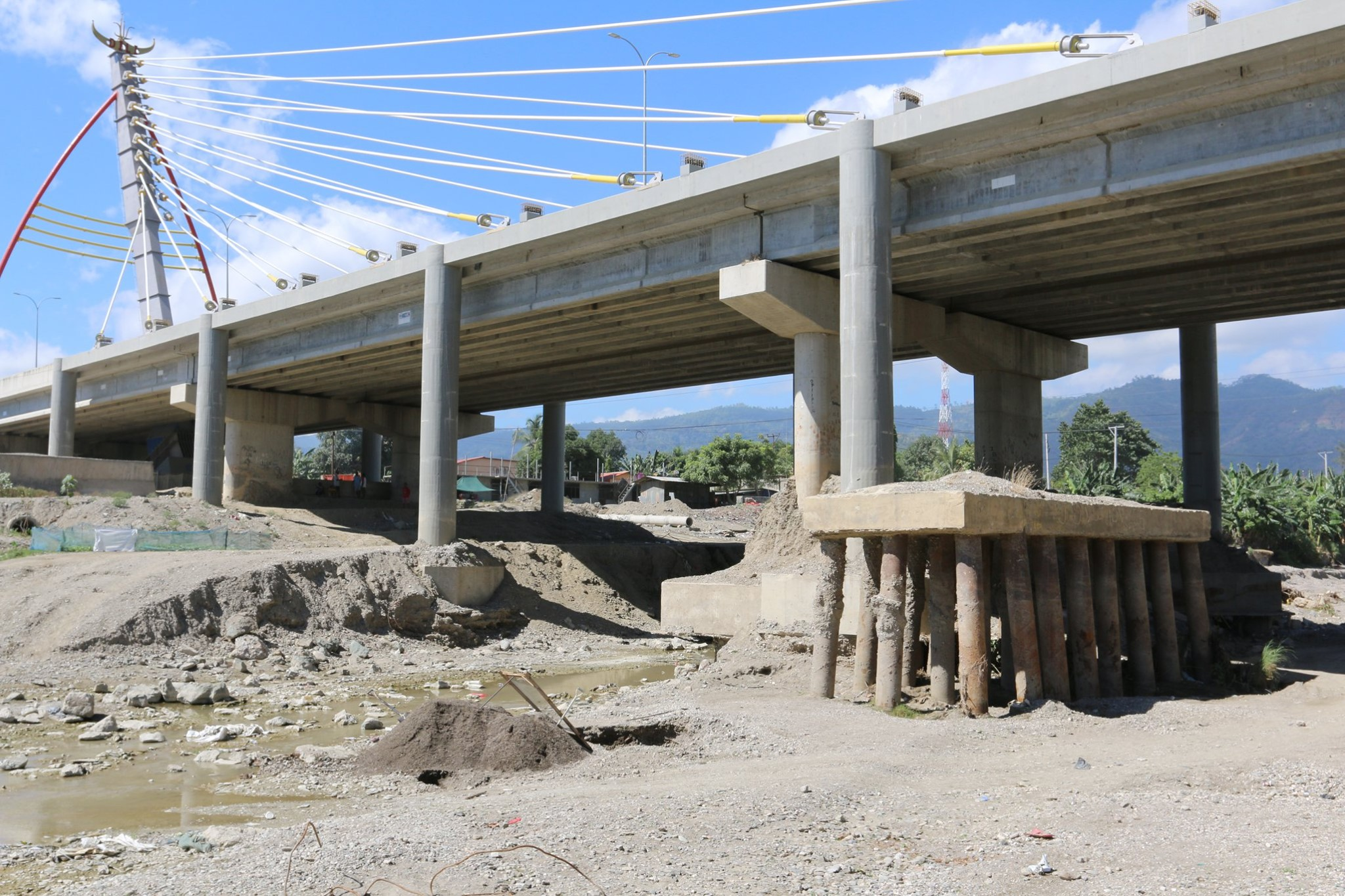
- The bridge during dry season in 2019
- Coordinates: 8°33′15″S 125°32′11″E
- Carries: Avenida Presidente Nicolau Lobato
- Crosses: Comoro River
- Locale: Comoro, Dili, Timor-Leste
- Official name: CPLP Bridge
- Other name(s): Comoro Bridges I and II (during construction)
- Named for: CPLP
- Preceded by: Hinode Bridge

Characteristics
- Design: Extradosed
- Material: Concrete, steel
- Total length: 183 m (600 ft)
- Width: 7 m (23 ft); (each roadway)
- No. of lanes: 2 in each direction

History
- Constructed by: PT Wijaya Karya (Persero) Tbk. (WIKA); Timorese National Consortium (CNT)
- Construction cost: c. US$24 million
- Inaugurated: 30 May 2013 / 22 July 2014
- Replaces: Comoro Bridge I

Location
- Interactive map of CPLP Bridge

The CPLP Bridge (Portuguese: Ponte CPLP, Tetum: Ponte CPLP) (known during the construction phase as Comoro Bridges I and II) is a pair of two-lane road bridges in the suco of Comoro, a western suburb of Dili, capital city of Timor-Leste.

== Location ==
The bridge carries Avenida Presidente Nicolau Lobato across the Comoro River, 800 m (2,600 ft) north of the Hinode Bridge (Comoro Bridge III).

== History ==
The bridge was built to replace an earlier Comoro Bridge I, a steel framed structure on the same site that had been a vital transport route in Dili, as it had been the only bridge over the main and largest of Dili's four major rivers.

The project for the new bridge was one of a number of infrastructure schemes developed by the Government of East Timor in preparation for the 10th CPLP Summit (Portuguese: X Cimeira da CPLP), the 10th biennial meeting of heads of state and heads of government of the Community of Portuguese Language Countries (Portuguese: Comunidade dos Países de Língua Portuguesa (CPLP)), which was held in Dili on 23 July 2014.

Construction of the new bridge proceeded in two stages. In 2012, the East Timorese Ministry of Public Works initiated the first stage, by engaging a joint venture consisting of an Indonesian State-owned enterprise, PT Wijaya Karya (Persero) Tbk. (WIKA), and a local group, the Timorese National Consortium (Portuguese: Consórcio Nacional Timorense (CNT)), as contractor to build Comoro Bridge II alongside the existing bridge. Work on that stage began on 1 September 2012 and ended on 31 May 2013, at a contract price of US$8.758 million.

On 30 May 2013, the Comoro II Bridge was inaugurated by the Prime Minister of East Timor, Xanana Gusmão. During his speech at the ceremony, the Prime Minister praised the builders of the bridge, but also criticised those who:

"... do not want to work and only sit in front of the television smoking, while our Indonesian friends are doing the work. In this way, we are not going to make progress. When WIKA started this job, despite having a very short time frame, and having faced very bad weather, they continued to work. We are now going to repair [sic - replace] the other part of the bridge. However, we also need to concentrate ourselves on other projects, which are equally important to our development. I therefore ask for a strong commitment from WIKA and the CNT. I am also asking the community of Comoro to commit itself in the country's development."

Two days earlier, on 28 May 2013, demolition of the old Comoro Bridge I had started. On 11 October 2013, the same WIKA/CNT joint venture began construction of the replacement Comoro Bridge I. The construction work took until 8 July 2014; its total cost was the higher sum of over US$11.7 million, as it included the installation of a footpath on each of the outward facing sides of the new pair of bridges.

On the day on which the replacement Comoro Bridge I was completed, the Minister of Public Works, Gastão de Sousa, announced that the new pair of bridges across the Comoro would be named the CPLP Bridge, in honour of the CPLP. On 22 July 2014, the day before the 10th CPLP Summit, the President of East Timor, Taur Matan Ruak, inaugurated the completed structure as a whole. During his speech, the President said that the CPLP Bridge:

"... is a symbol, a happy choice in recognition of the solidarity of friends and brothers of Timor-Leste who supported us during the liberation struggle. The CPLP is an identity and this is a bridge between Timor-Leste and brother nations across the seas."

Also present at the inauguration ceremony were representatives of the CPLP and of the government of East Timor, including Xanana Gusmão. The other member countries of the CPLP were represented at the ceremony as follows:

- the President of the Republic of Cape Verde, Carlos Fonseca;
- the President of the Republic of Mozambique, Armando Guebuza;
- the President of the Democratic Republic of São Tomé and Príncipe, Manuel Pinto da Costa;
- the Vice President of the Republic of Angola, Manuel Domingos Vicente;
- the Prime Minister of Guinea-Bissau, Domingos Simões Pereira;
- the Prime Minister of Portugal, Pedro Passos Coelho; and
- the Vice-Minister of Foreign Affairs of Brazil, Paulo Cordeiro de Andrade Pinto.

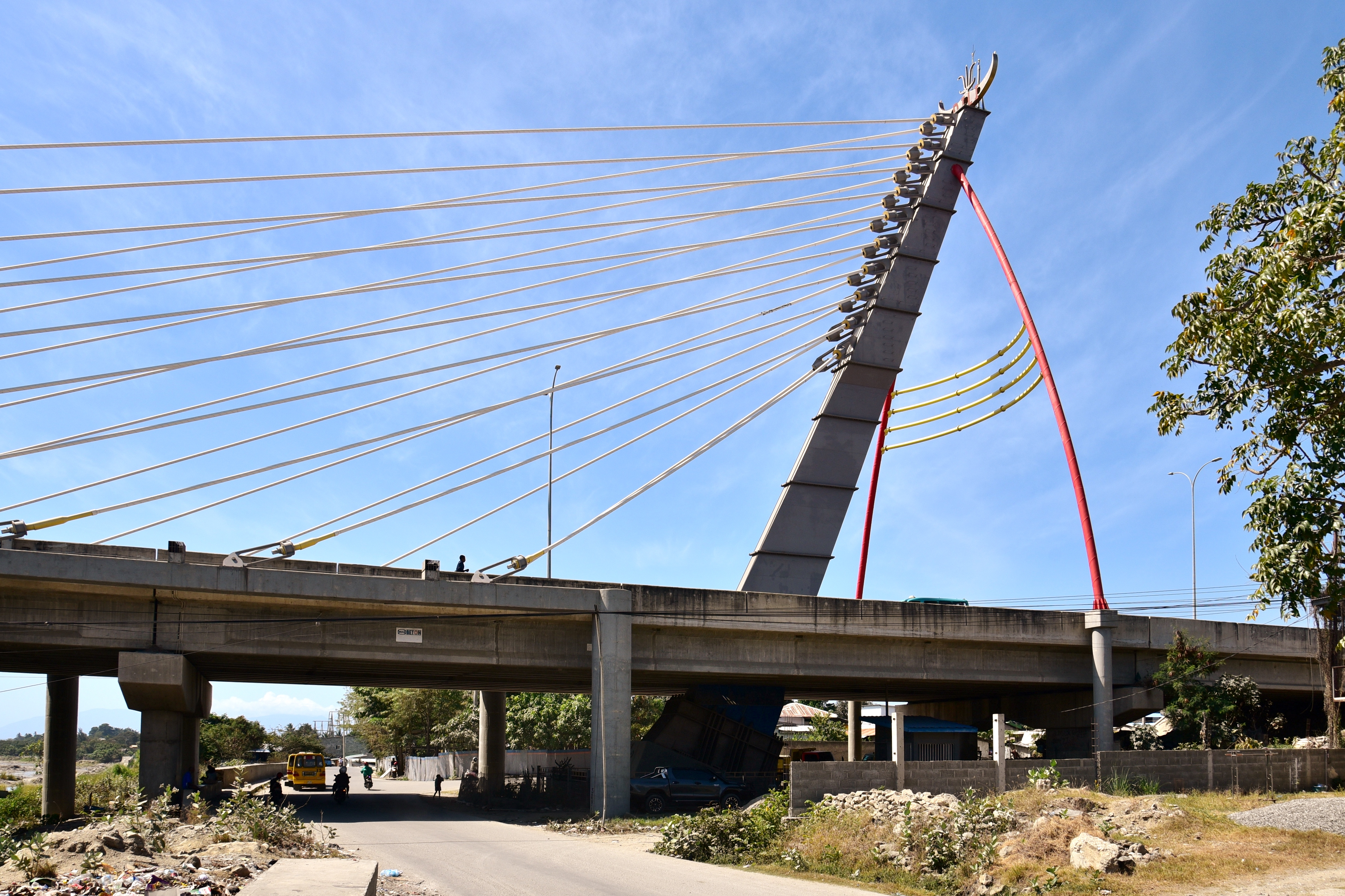
Side view of the pylon, and arch with Kaibauk above its apex

At the conclusion of the ceremony, the Bishop of Dili, Dom Alberto Ricardo, blessed the bridge.

After the bridge was opened, an arch extending over both of its roadways, and a Kaibauk mounted above the apex of the arch, were added at the pylon. The cost of these additions was about $3 million.

In early 2019, flooding of the river was observed to have caused degradation and damage to the foundations of some of the bridge piers. In an effort to prevent any further such damage, the Ministry of Public Works has constructed retention dams in the river.

== Description ==
CPLP Bridge is an extradosed bridge with its deck resting on pre-cast I-girders. It is 183 m (600 ft) long, each of its roadways is 7 m (23 ft) wide, and it has a footpath on each side.

The Avenida carried by the bridge is the main route between central Dili and the west side of the city, including the Presidente Nicolau Lobato International Airport, and the Tibar Bay Port, which went into operation in late 2022.
