= Hinode Bridge =

Road bridge over the Comoro River

Hinode Bridge Ponte Hinode (Portuguese) Ponte Hinode (Tetum)
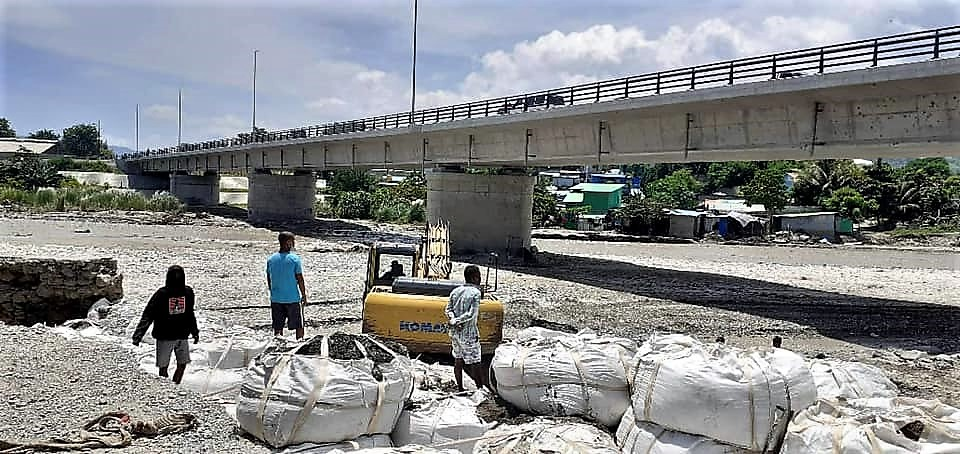
- The bridge in March 2022
- Coordinates: 8°33′40″S 125°32′03″E
- Carries: Road vehicles, pedestrians
- Crosses: Comoro River
- Locale: Comoro, Dili, Timor-Leste
- Official name: Hinode Bridge
- Other name: Comoro Bridge III (during construction)
- Named for: Japan / Timor-Leste
- Followed by: CPLP Bridge

Characteristics
- Design: Box girder
- Material: Concrete, steel
- Total length: 250 m (820 ft)
- Width: 11.55 m (37.9 ft)
- No. of spans: 6
- No. of lanes: 2

History
- Constructed by: Tobishima Corporation
- Construction start: August 2016
- Construction cost: 2.605 billion yen; (approx. US$23.7 million)
- Opened: 13 September 2018
- Inaugurated: 12 October 2018

Location
- Interactive map of Hinode Bridge

The Hinode Bridge (Portuguese: Ponte Hinode, Tetum: Ponte Hinode) (known during the construction phase as the Comoro Bridge III) is a two-lane road bridge in the suco of Comoro, a western suburb of Dili, capital city of Timor-Leste. It was built by a Japanese company, Tobishima Corporation, between 2016 and 2018, with grant aid funding from the Government of Japan.

== Location ==
The bridge spans the Comoro River, 800 m (2,600 ft) south of the CPLP Bridge (formerly known as Comoro Bridges I and II). It connects the Avenida de Hudi-Laran (transl. Banana Road) in the east with the National Highway 3 in the west.

== History ==
In 2013, the government of Timor-Leste opened the first stage of the new bridge later named the CPLP Bridge, and thereby expanded the number of road lanes crossing the Comoro River from two to four. However, as the Asian Development Bank (ADB) had forecast an increase in traffic demand in East Timor for the period 2010–2019, the government also asked the government of Japan to construct an additional bridge upriver of the four lane bridge.

In response, the Japan International Cooperation Agency (JICA) despatched a preparatory survey team to Timor-Leste to carry out a field survey in June/July 2013. The survey team's report on the field survey, dated February 2014, proposed the construction of a new two-lane bridge approximately 250 m (820 ft) in length (with allowance for expansion to four lanes), and the development of two-lane access roads approximately 3.2 km (2.0 mi) in total length.

The upriver bridge, then known as the "Comoro Bridge III", was built by Tobishima Corporation of Japan, with a consortium of Ingérosec Corporation, Nippon Engineering Consultants Co., Ltd. and Idea Consultants, Inc. as consultants. The bridge's construction was funded by the Government of Japan, which, through JICA, made available grant aid of up to 2.605 billion yen (approximately US$23.7 million).

Work began in mid 2016, and the ceremonial laying of the foundation stone took place on 17 October 2016. As part of the work, the new access roads proposed in the field survey report were constructed, including a road near the Tasi Tolu area and a new connection to the roundabout outside the Presidente Nicolau Lobato International Airport. The project employed 37 foreigners, 15 local engineers and more than a hundred local workers.

The bridge was opened to traffic on 13 September 2018, a month behind schedule. The official opening ceremony was held on 12 October 2018, during a visit to East Timor of the Japanese Foreign Minister Tarō Kōno. The East Timorese officials who attended were Prime Minister Taur Matan Ruak, Transport and Communications Minister José Agustinho da Silva, and Public Works Minister Salvador Soares dos Reis Pires.

At the opening ceremony, the official name of the structure, "Hinode Bridge", was announced. The Japanese word "hinode" means "rising sun", an expression used to refer both to Japan (the "Land of the Rising Sun") and to East Timor (the Tetum word for "East", Loro Sa'e, literally means "rising sun").

== Description ==
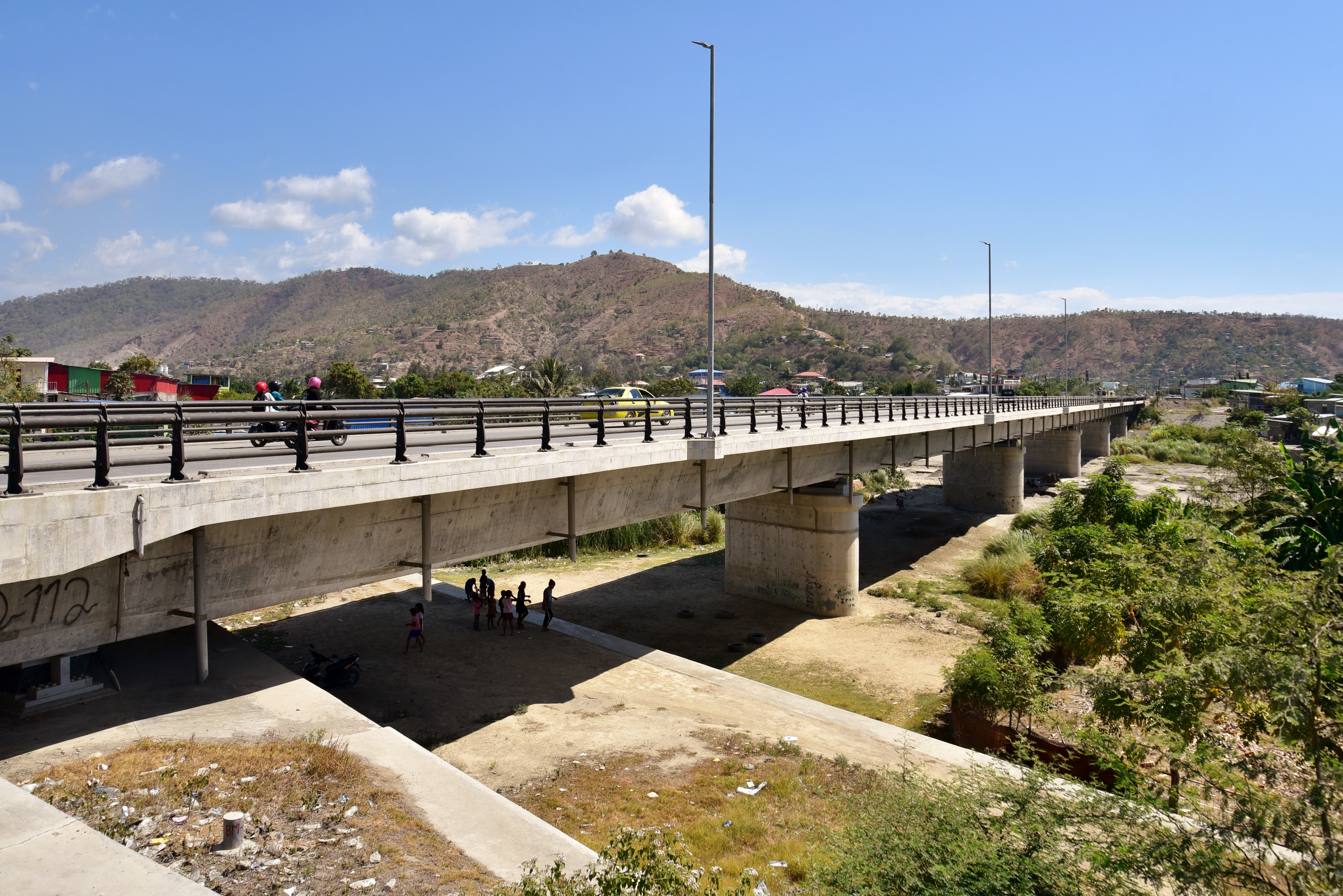
The bridge in August 2023

Hinode Bridge is of box girder design, has a superstructure spanning 250 m (820 ft) and consists of six arches, two with a length of 33.7 m (111 ft), and four measuring 45 m (148 ft) in length. The bridge is 11.55 m (37.9 ft) wide, the two lanes are each 3.5 m (11 ft) wide, and there is a footpath on each side.

The bridge was intended to be a new alternative route across the river to accommodate increasing traffic between Dili's city centre in the east and its western suburban area, which includes the International Airport and the new seaport at Tibar Bay. It was expected that the bridge would reduce traffic across the CPLP Bridge.

Additionally, the bridge is now part of the Mikrolet (minibus) line 11, which connects Manleuana Market with Tasi Tolu.
