= Bandeira Waterfall =

Waterfall in East Timor

- Cascata Bandeira (Portuguese); Be Tuda Bandera (Tetum)
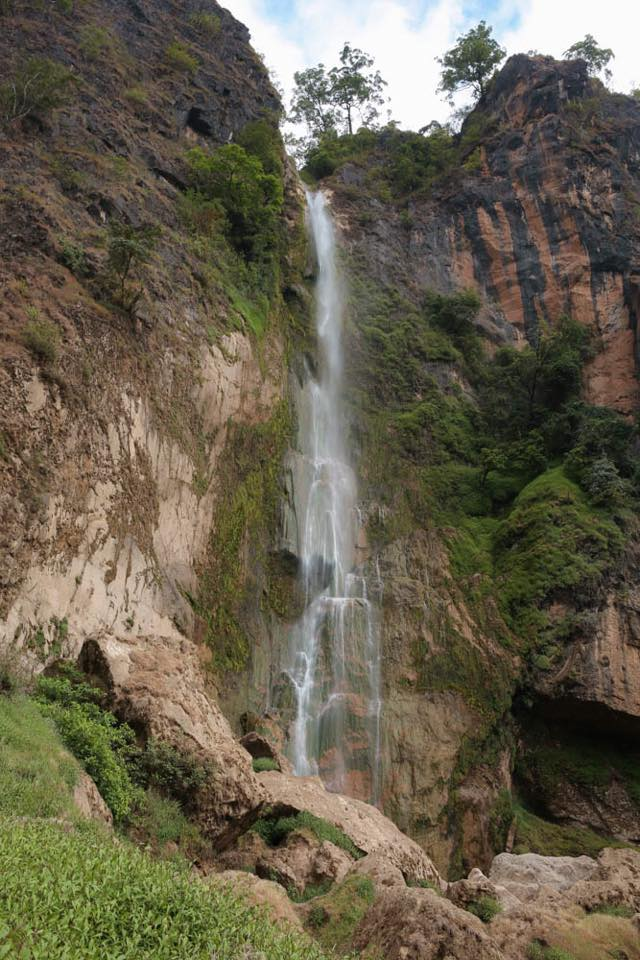
- The waterfall in 2015

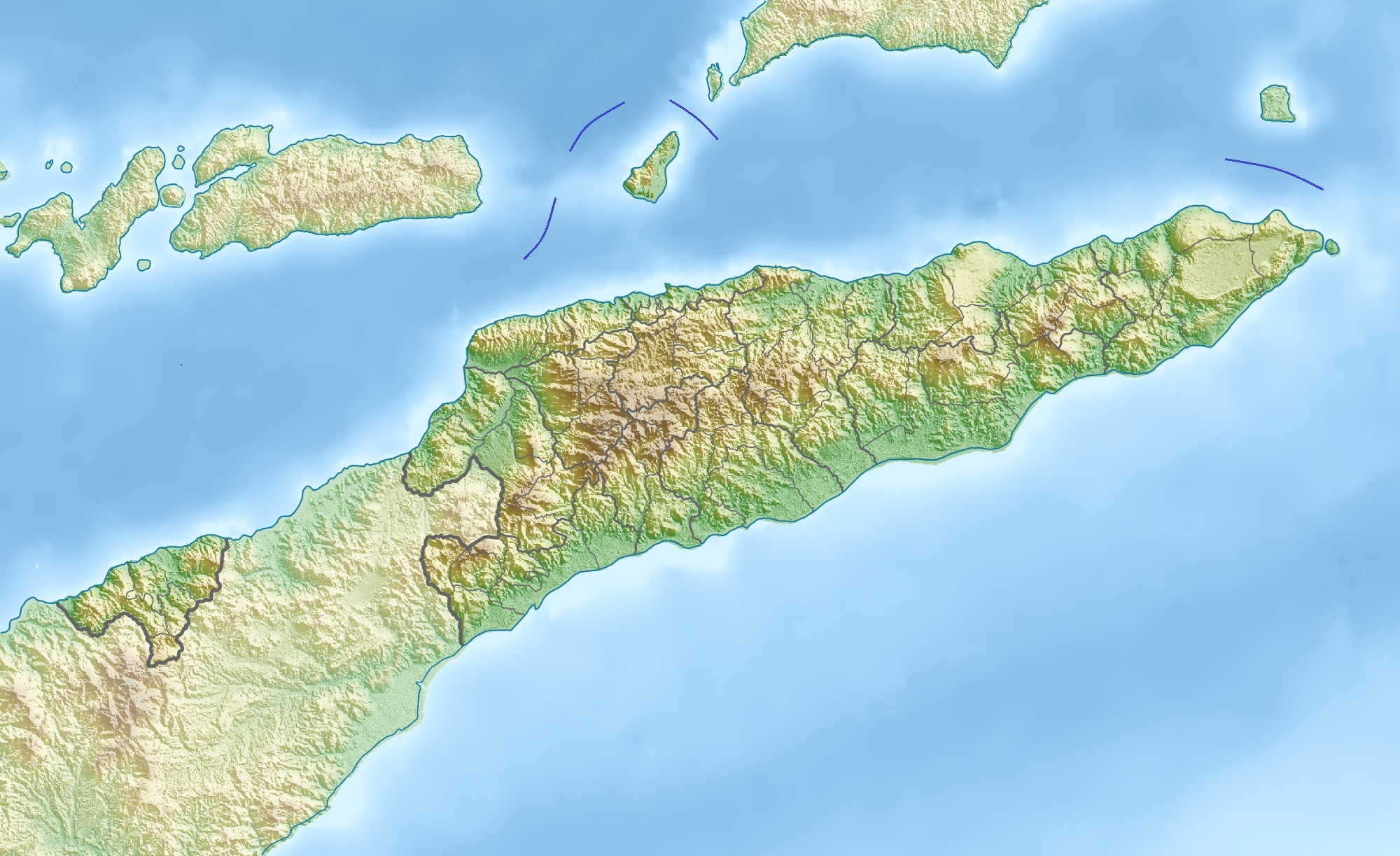
- Location within East Timor
- Location: Baboi Craic, Atsabe, Ermera, East Timor
- Coordinates: 8°55′09″S 125°25′44″E
- Watercourse: Bandeira River

The Bandeira Waterfall (Portuguese: Cascata Bandeira, Tetum: Be Tuda Bandera) is a tall waterfall in the municipality of Ermera, Timor-Leste. It forms part of a minor tributary of the Loes River.

== Geography ==
The waterfall is located just to the east of the Letefoho–Atsabe road near Atsabe in the Ermera municipality. The tallest waterfall in Timor-Leste, it has been described as "é de registar" (transl. worth noting), and as "... an impressive sight in the wet season."

At the waterfall, the Bandeira River (Portuguese: Rio Bandeira, Tetum: Mota Bandera) flows over a vertical cliff.

The river then feeds into the Magapu River, which is a tributary of the Loes River, and, at that point, marks the border between the sucos of Baboi Leten (to its north) and Baboi Craic (to its south).

== Economy ==
The waterfall has been identified as having geotourism potential, and the river as being a hydrological resource with tourism potential.

== See also ==
- Berloi Waterfall
- List of waterfalls
