= Fatisi =

Coordinates: 8.6467°S 125.5278°E

- Suco
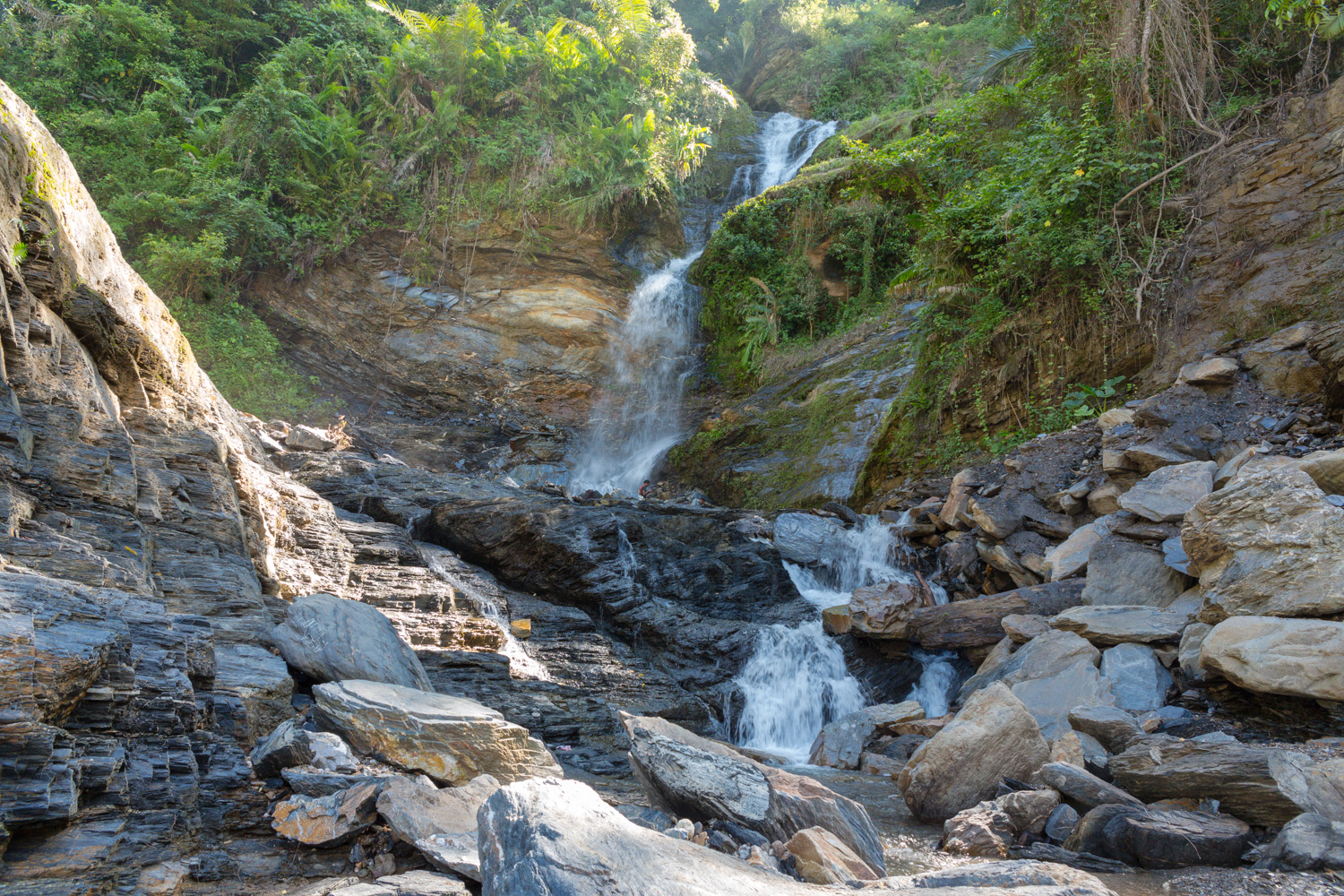
- Berloi Falls in Fatisi

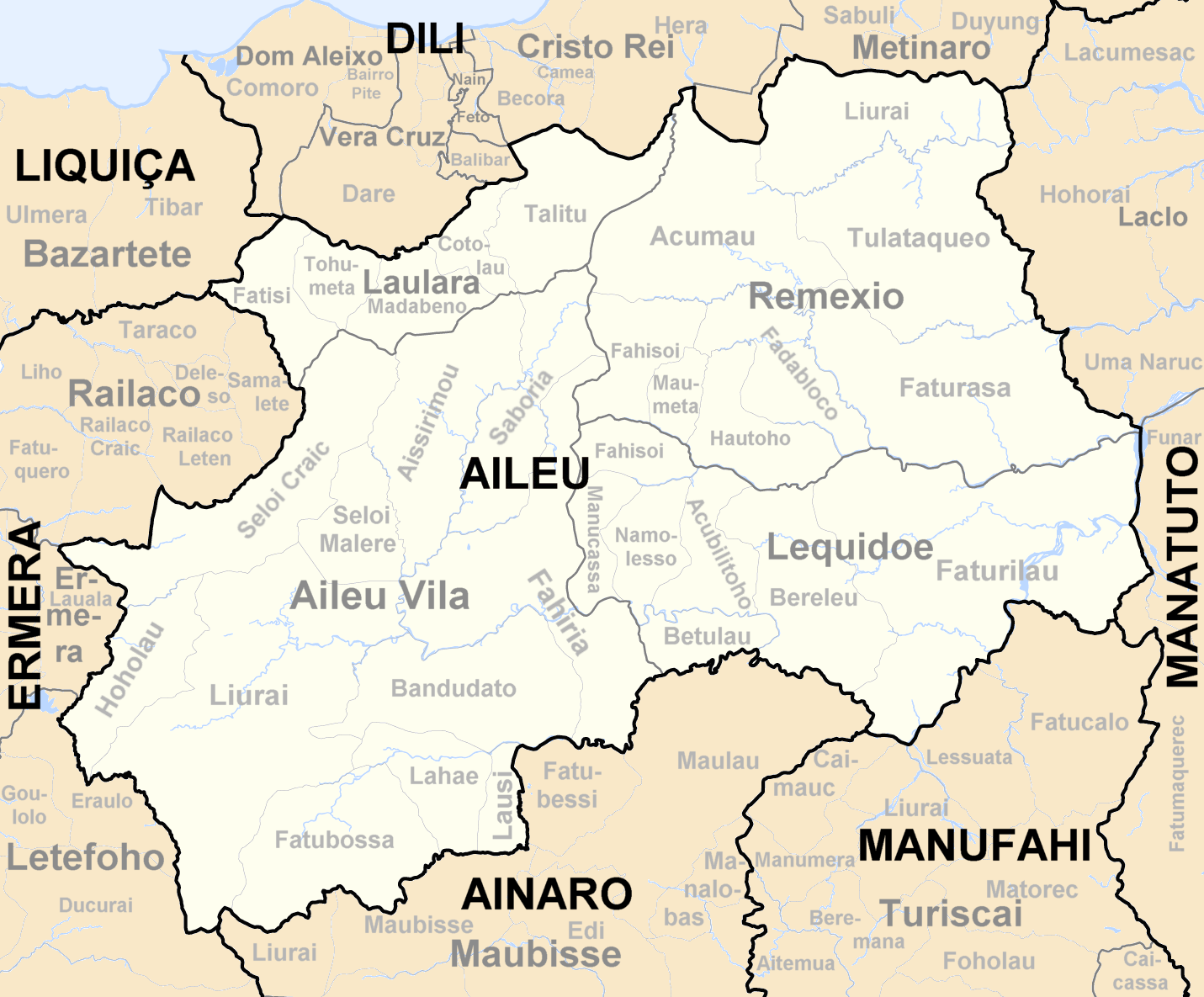
- Sucos of Aileu District
- Country: Timor-Leste
- District: Aileu
- Subdistrict: Laulara

Area
  - Total: 11.82 km^{2} (4.56 sq mi)

Population (2010)
  - Total: 1,156
- Time zone: UTC +9

Fatisi is a suco in Laulara subdistrict, Aileu District, Timor-Leste. The administrative area covers an area of 11.82 square kilometres and at the time of the 2010 census it had a population of 1156 people.
