= Laulara Administrative Post =

Administrative post in Laulara Municipality, Timor-Leste

Laulara
- Administrative Post
- Posto Administrativo de Laulara (Portuguese); Postu administrativu Laulara (Tetum)
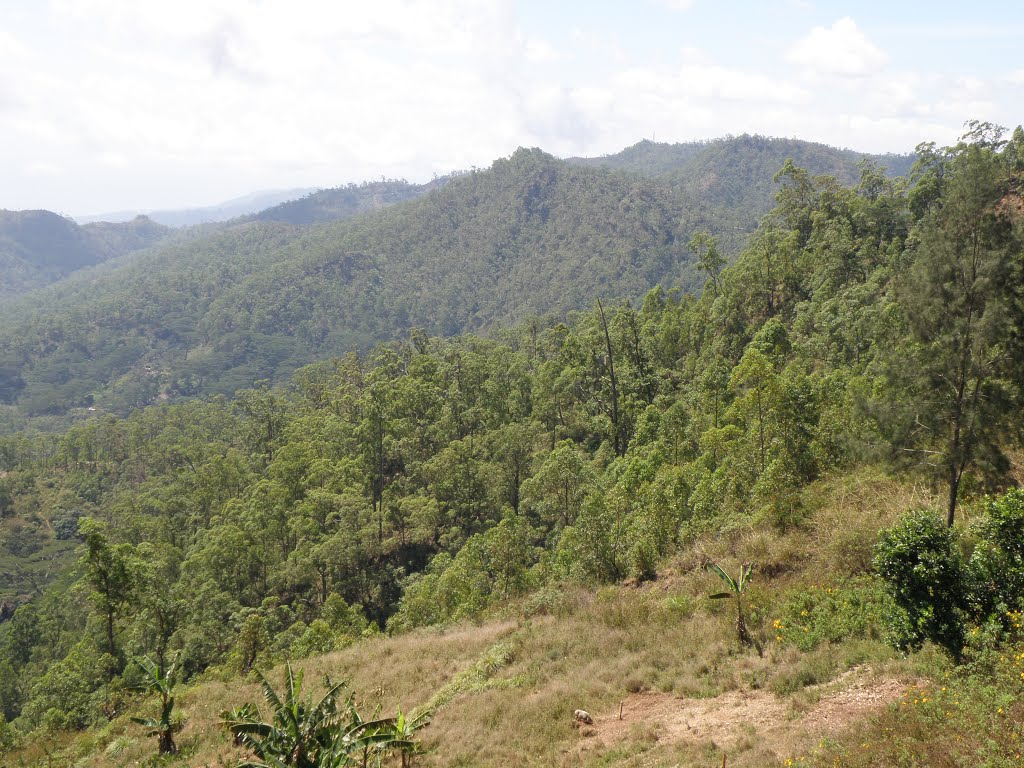
- Eucalyptus urophylla forest near Madabeno

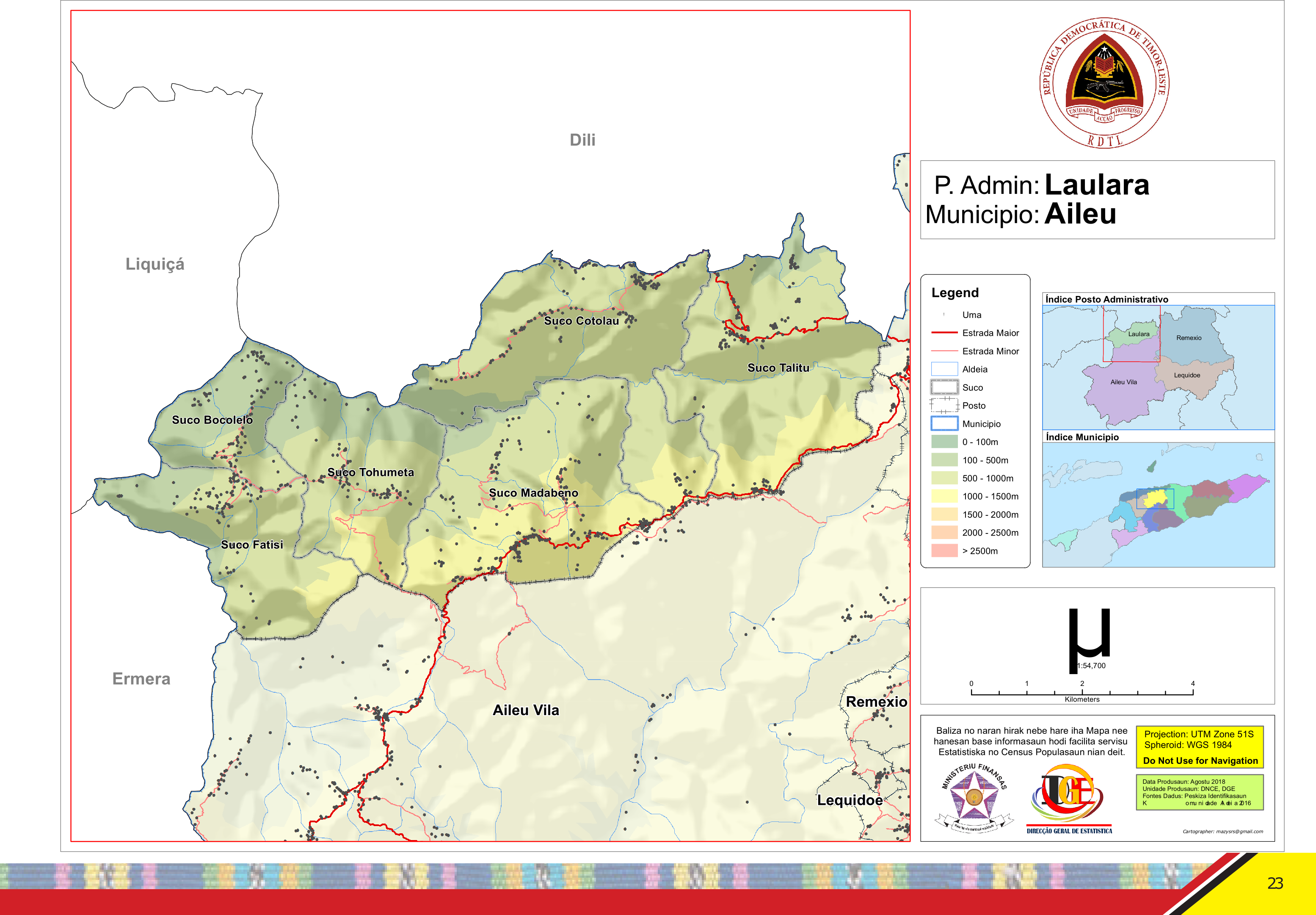
- Official map

- Location within East Timor
- Coordinates: 8°36′11″S 125°35′38″E
- Country: Timor-Leste
- Municipality: Aileu
- Seat: Madabeno
- Sucos: Bocolelo; Cotolau; Fatisi; Madabeno; Talitu; Tohumeta

Area
  - Total: 66.7 km^{2} (25.8 sq mi)

Population (2015 census)
  - Total: 7,090
  - Density: 106/km^{2} (275/sq mi)

Households (2015 census)
  - Total: 1,066
- Time zone: UTC+09:00 (TLT)

Laulara, officially Laulara Administrative Post (Portuguese: Posto Administrativo de Laulara, Tetum: Postu administrativu Laulara), is an administrative post (and was formerly a subdistrict) in Aileu municipality, Timor-Leste. Its seat or administrative centre is Madabeno.
