= Shimon Maryles =

Hasidic rabbi (1758–1849)

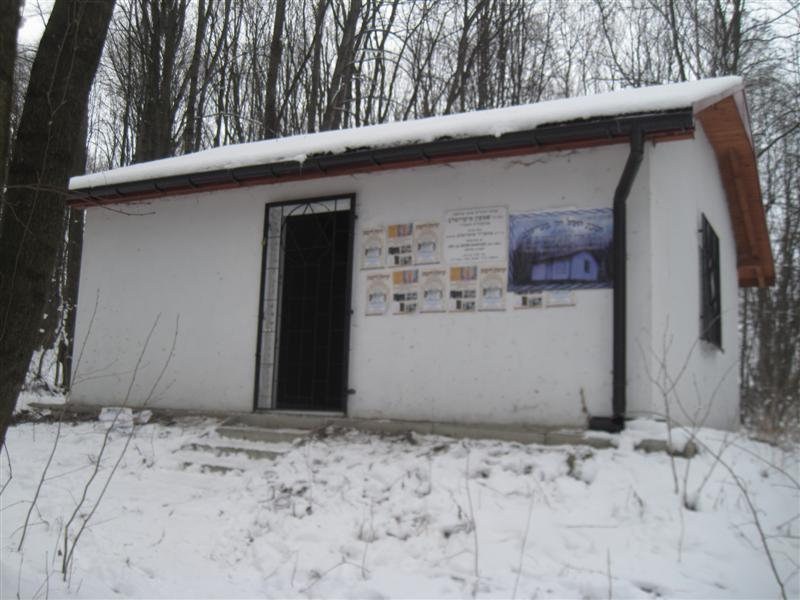
The new structure on Rabbi Shimon's tomb - built by Agudath Ohalei Tzadikim, 2010

Rabbi Shimon Maryles (Hebrew: רבי שמעון מרילס) (1758–1849) from Jarosław (Yiddish: Yeruslav), also known as Rabbi Shimon Yerslover, was the founder of Yeruslav Hasidism (Hebrew: חסידות ירוסלב).

== Biography ==
Maryles was born in Łuków, to his father Rabbi Israel (Elbaum) from Józefów, the son of Rabbi Yaakov Kopel, of Lukov.

As a child, his father moved to Józefów.

Rabbi Ya'akov Koppel made a living from his inn and a whirlpool managed by employees. He himself sat day and night in Talmudic Study and his name became known in the area as a true scholar and as a generous person. He was opposed to the Hasidic Movement. It is recounted that the Ba'al Shem Tov, the founder of Chasidus, tried to attract Rabbi Ya'akov Kopel to Hasidism but he was unsuccessful. Rabbi Yaakov Koppel was offered various rabbinic positions and he rejected all of them, including the rabbinate proposed to him by the community in Amsterdam. He died on February 22, 1769.

His son Rabbi Israel Leib followed him and strongly opposed Hasidism.

In his youth, Maryles, son of Rabbi Israel Leib, was pursued by his rabbi and cousin the prominent Chozeh MiLublin (his mother was Rabbi Israel Leib's sister) and Rabbi Shimon became Hasidic. As a result, his father was so upset that he told him not to say Kaddish for him with the addition of 'Veyatsmach' as per the custom of Hasidim (Nusach Sefard). He firmly held that it would be better not to say Kaddish at all than to recite that version.

After his marriage, Maryles lived with his wife's family in Jaroslaw.

== Teachers ==
The first of his rebbes was Rabbi Elimelech of Lizhensk.

When Rabbi Yaakov Yitzchak Horowitz, the "Chozeh/Seer of Lublin," began to head the community, Rabbi Shimon joined him, even though Rabbi Elimelech was still alive. He always had viewed the "Chozeh" as the highest authority and saw himself as his devoted follower. At the same time, he also received the authority of Rabbi Menachem Mendel of Rimanov, who lived in close proximity to Jarosław, as instructed by the "Chozeh."

After the death of the Chozeh and of Rabbi Menachem Mendel of Rimanov, in 1825, he traveled extensively to Rabbi Naftali Zvi of Ropshitz, who was one year younger than him, until his death. Then he continued to travel to Rav Naftali's son, Rabbi Menashe, even though he was forty years younger than him. He also traveled to Rabbi Zvi Hirsch Meshares, who was the assistant of Rabbi Menachem Mendel of Rimanov and succeeded him after his death, and to Rabbi Tzvi Hirsh of Zidichov, who began to lead the community after the passing of the Chozeh. In his old age he would often travel to Rabbi Sholom Rokeach of Belz. It is said that when he once arrived at Rabbi Shalom at the age of ninety, the latter told him that at such an age he should stay at home, but he replied to him "at home, one rots" ("בבית מתעפשים"). He had a place of honor in Belz, and many of his Divrei Torah and stories were preserved by Belz's followers.

He was close to many of the Admorim of his generation and although he lived until ninety-one and was becoming blind, he continued to travel to the admorim, young and old.

Also among his many teachers were: Rabbis Moshe Leib of Sassov, Moshe of Peshawarsk, Meir of Premishlan, Chaim of Kosov, Chaim Halberstam of Sanz, Shalom of Kaminka and Issachar Dov Av Beit Din of Sokal (father-in-law of Rabbi Sholom Rokeach of Belz).

== Rabbinate ==
After the passing of Rabbi Elimelech of Lizhensk, his disciples appointed Rabbi Shimon to a Rebbe without asking him, for fear of being refused.

Good relations existed between him and the rabbis of the city: Rabbi Yehuda Heller-Wallerstein, Rabbi Naphtali Hertz Sharif, and Rabbi Yaakov Yitzchak Horowitz, author of "Beer Yitzhak". The "Dayan Hagadol" in the city was Rabbi Aryeh Leibush Horwitz, brother of Rabbi Eliezer of Tarnogród, author of "Noam Megadim".

He was involved in public affairs in the city, and personally handled the existence of the institutions, such as Mikveh and Kosher slaughter. When they were building the Great Synagogue and held a comprehensive fundraiser, Rabbi Shimon took an active part, despite having his own synagogue (kloyz). He also served as the chairman of the committee of seven members of dignitaries, which was set up on 19 January 1834 to raise funds, so that the poor children could also be exempt from the Austrian army.

His secretary (the gabbai) of Rabbi Shimon was Menachem Mendel (Mendish) Taustein.

== Disciples ==
Among his famous students was Rabbi Shlomo Zalman Frankel of Willipoli, who later became a rebbe. Until the Holocaust there were generations of rabbis and rebbes from his students. Also known to travel to Rabbi Shimon were Rabbis Yitzchak Isaac of Zidichov and Yitschok Aizik Yehudah Yechiel Safrin of Komarno, Ukraine. Rabbi Joseph Babad of Ternopol, author of "Minchat Chinuch", traveled to him twice.

== Death ==
Rabbi Shimon died on the first day of Sukkot, 1849, and was buried in the cemetery in the Falkin suburb about eight kilometers from Jarosław. An Ohel/structure was built on his tomb. Buried there as well were his son Rabbi Bunem Mendel and his wife, and his son-in-law Rabbi Kehat Hilferrin and his wife.

The city's Jews used to visit the place mainly during the days of mercy and forgiveness. The Ohel was destroyed by rioters during the Holocaust and for a long time its place was unknown in the ruined cemetery. On 19 February 2010, the Ohel was re-inaugurated by Agudath Ohalei Tsadikim.

== Family ==
Rabbi Shimon married his wife Baila, a resident of Jarosław. Ten of their children are known:

- Rabbi Bonem Menachem Mendel Maryles, continued the Hasidic dynasty in Jarosław.
- Rabbi Yitzchak Maryles of Rufschitz, married Sarah daughter of Rabbi Menashe Rubin Rebbe of Ropshitz and later succeeded him.

He had a daughter who married Rabbi Ya'akov Mordechai Lieberman Av Beit Din in Toporov.

- Rabbi Naftali Maryles Rabbi of Litowisk.

He was born when his father was about seventy years old and was named after Rabbi Naftali of Ropshitz who died. His grandson Rabbi Yosef Maryles printed Rabbi Naftali's writings in the book "Ayala Shluchah". The book also contains a great deal of material about Rabbi Shimon and the history of his descendants in Litowisk. The son of Rabbi Naftali, Rabbi Ya'akov Kopel succeeded him in Litovisk.

- The wife of Rabbi Yehoshua Lam of Belz
- Sheindel Raisel the wife of Rabbi Kahat Hilperin
- The wife of Rabbi Yehuda Leibish Helmer of Warsaw
- The wife of Rabbi Eliyahu Zvi Weber Rabazov.
- The wife of Rabbi Nathan Nota of Chinica
- The Wife of Rabbi Mordechai Heller of Jarosław
- Freida, the wife of Rabbi Zvi Verman, son of Rabbi Abraham David Wahrman, Rabbi of Buczacz.

His brother, Rabbi Moshe, was also a chasid and lived in Lizhensk. His gravestone states for his honor that he was the brother of Rabbi Shimon. He had a son Yisroel, who died on 15 shevat, 5623, and is buried in the old cemetery in Safed.

Another brother was Rabbi Ya'akov Kopel who lived in Olinab.

== Teachings ==
Rabbi Shimon himself did not write down his teachings, but compilations from his students were printed in the book "Torat Shimon." First edition Jarosław, 5668. Published in many other editions. Translated into English and published in Michigan, 2000.

== Continuation of Hasidus ==
After his passing, his oldest son Rabbi Bonem Menachem Mendel took his place. He was followed by his grandson Rabbi Shimon, the son of Rabbi Bunam Mendel, who was born after the death of his grandfather and was named after him. These three sons of Rabbi Shimon completed the dynasty:

- Rabbi David (son-in-law of Rabbi Menachem Mendel Eichenstein of Zidichov), who succeeded Rabbi Shimon, followed by his son, Rabbi Binyamin Menachem, who was crowned to replace his father despite being a teenager.
- Rabbi Israel Arie Leib (son-in-law of Rabbi Todres Rokach of Niemirow) - led his own synagogue in Jaroslav until, the outbreak of WWII. When the Nazis invaded Poland in 1939 he fled to Zolkiew where he perished c. 1943 while fleeing through a nearby forest.
- Rabbi Eliezer (son-in-law of Rabbi Moshe Mikarov and from his second marriage son-in-law of Rabbi Asher Isaiah of Zelkova). After World War I, he moved to Berlin and served as Rebbe of Yeruslav. He perished in the Holocaust.

== See also ==
- History of the Jews in Poland
