= Veretzky (Rabbinical dynasty) =

Rabbinical dynasty

Veretzky Yiddish: Veretzky
- Hasidic Jewish Rabbinical dynasty
- Parent family: Landau
- Origin: Nyzhni Vorota, Ukraine
- Founder: Rabbi Moshe Ber Landau
- Current head: Rabbi Yitzchak Meir Landau II
- Seat: Khal Hisachdus Yirieim Veretzky (synagogue), in Midwood, Brooklyn, New York City, New York, United States
- Traditions: Orthodox Judaism
- Cadet branches: Ziditshov

Veretzky is a Hasidic Jewish Rabbinical dynasty originating in Nyzhni Vorota, Ukraine (known as Veretzky in Yiddish), near the borders with Hungary and Slovakia. While the dynasty reestablished its court in the United States, a dynasty of the same name has been recently established in Israel as well.

== Landau family dynasty ==
=== History ===
Rabbi Moshe Ber Landau served as the rabbi and dayan (rabbinic judge) of Nyzhni Vorota. His son Rabbi Shalom Noach Landau served as the village's rabbi after him, while another son, Rabbi Yitzchak Meir Landau, served as rabbi of Khust. Rabbi Yitzchak Meir's son, Rabbi Yechezkel Shraga Landau, also served as a rabbi, for a time in Nyzhni Vorota as well as in Yaasin and Nitra, from 1929. While both Rabbi Shalom Noach and Rabbi Yitzchak Meir were killed in the Holocaust, Rabbi Yechezkel Shraga Landau was not, and emigrated to the United States after World War II, settling initially in Williamsburg, Brooklyn.

In 1952, he moved to the Midwood neighborhood of Brooklyn and reestablished the community of his ancestors with the opening a synagogue called Khal Hisachdis Yirieim Veretzky, becoming known as the Veretzkier Rebbe. It moved to its current location on Avenue L and East 9th Street in around 1970. In 1980, Rabbi Landau arranged for more minyanim to take place in the synagogue, turning it into a "minyan factory" (a synagogue with minyanim available throughout the day). In 1986, Rabbi Landau established a yeshiva that would become known as Yeshiva Ohr Shraga Veretzky, a yeshiva for Jewish children living in the neighborhood, which blossomed in the Mosdos Veretzky yeshiva network.

Rabbi Yechezkel Shraga died in 1996 and his son, Rabbi Aharon Tzvi Landau, known during his tenure as the Veretzkier Rav, succeeded him as rabbi of the community, a position he held until his death in 2003. He was succeeded by his son, Rabbi Yitzchak Meir Landau, who is the current Veretzkier Rav.

=== Modern institutions ===
Khal Hisachdis Yirieim Veretzky (Rabbi Landau's Shul / Landau's)
- Location in New York City

Religion
- Affiliation: Orthodox Judaism
- Ecclesiastical or organisational status: Synagogue
- Leadership: Rabbi Yitzchak Meir Landau (II)
- Status: Active

Location
- Location: 1202 East 9th Street, Midwood, Brooklyn, New York City, New York 11230
- Country: United States
- Coordinates: 40°37′11″N 73°57′59″W

Architecture
- Founder: Rabbi Yechezkel Shraga
- Established: 1952 (as a congregation)

The letterhead and emblem of Khal Hisachdis Yirieim Veretzky in Midwood

The Khal Hisachdis Yirieim Veretzky, popularly known as Rabbi Landau's Shul or simply as Landau's, is an Orthodox Jewish synagogue is located at 1202 East 9th Street, at the intersection with Avenue L, in the Flatbush neighborhood of Midwood, Brooklyn, New York City, New York, in the United States. The synagogue established the Keren Zichron Rabbeinu Yechezkel Shraga fund for impoverished families, named after the founding rabbi of the community.

Mosdos Veretzky, the network of yeshivas founded by Rabbi Yechezkel Shraga Landau, currently includes four schools: Yeshiva Ohr Shraga elementary school and Mesivta Orchos Tzvi high school in Midwood, Ohr Shragelech Marine Park preschool in Marine Park, and Yeshiva Ohr Shraga Lakewood elementary school in Lakewood Township, New Jersey. The network of schools is run under the auspices of Rabbi Shalom Noah Landau, son of Rabbi Ahron Tzvi & brother to Rabbi Yitzchok Meir.

=== Lineage ===
- Rabbi Moshe Ber Landau of Veretzky
  - Rabbi Shalom Noach Landau of Veretzky
  - Rabbi Yitzchak Meir Landau (I) of Khust
    - Rabbi Yechezkel Shraga Landau of Veretzky
      - Rabbi Aharon Tzvi Landau of Veretzky
        - Rabbi Yitzchak Meir Landau (II) of Veretzky

== Veretzky offshoot in Israel ==
=== History ===
External videos
- Veretzky Rebbe in Lakewood
- Veretzky Rebbe in Williamsburg, Lag Ba'omer

Rabbi Elazar Weiser of Veretzky served as a rabbi in Veretzky in the nineteenth century. (Note: Known in one source as Rabbi Aharon Menachem Mendel.) His son-in-law was Rabbi Alexander (Sender) Yom Tov Lipa Eichenstein of Ziditshov, the son of Rabbi Yitzchak Isaac of Ziditshov whose son, Rabbi Yissachar Ber Eichenstein (1850–1924), served as rebbe in Veretzky for a short stint before becoming rebbe in Ziditshov. Rabbi Yissachar Berish's son, Rabbi Moshe Eichenstein (1874–1935), served as rebbe Veretzky for some time as well, as did Rabbi Moshe's son, Rabbi Eliyahu Eichenstein.

Today, the Veretzky chasidic court in Israel is likely an offshoot of the Ziditshov chassidic dynasty, and it is unclear why its founder chose the Veretzky name. Its Rebbe, Rabbi Yitzchak Isaac Labin, resides in Bnei Brak. He is the son of Rabbi Naftali Tzvi Labin of Ziditshov and a distant relative of the Eichensteins.

=== Lineage ===
Rabbi Yitzchak Isaac Eichenstein of Safrin (1740-1800)
Rabbi Tzvi Hirsh Eichenstein of Ziditshov (1763-1831)	Rabbi Yissachar Berish Eichenstein of Safrin (1768-1832)
Rabbi Naftali Hertz Labin of Ziditshov (?-?)	Rabbi Yitzchak Isaac Eichenstein of Ziditshov (1805-1873)	Rabbi Elazar Weiser of Veretzky (1805-1881)
Rabbi Yisrael Yosef Labin of Ziditshov (1825-1900)	Rabbi Alexander Sender Yom Tov Lipa Eichenstein of Ziditshov (1824-1883)
Rabbi Tzvi Hirsch Labin of Stryi (1845-1913)	Rabbi Yissachar Berish Eichenstein of Veretzky and Ziditshov (1850-1924)
Rabbi Shlomo Yehuda Labin of Kolomyia (?-?)	Rabbi Moshe Eichenstein of Veretzky of Munkacs (1874-1935)
Rabbi Alexander Yom Tov Lipa of Ziditshov-Beregszász (?-?)	Rabbi Eliyahu Eichenstein of Veretzky and Munkacs (?-?)
Rabbi Naftali Tzvi Labin of Ziditshov-Beregszász (c. 1916-2009)
Rabbi Yitzchak Isaac Labin of Veretzky (b. ?)

== See also ==
- Zidichov (Hasidic dynasty)
- Komarno (Hasidic dynasty)
