= Zidichov (Hasidic dynasty) =

Ukrainian Hasidic dynasty

Ziditshov Hasidic Dynasty
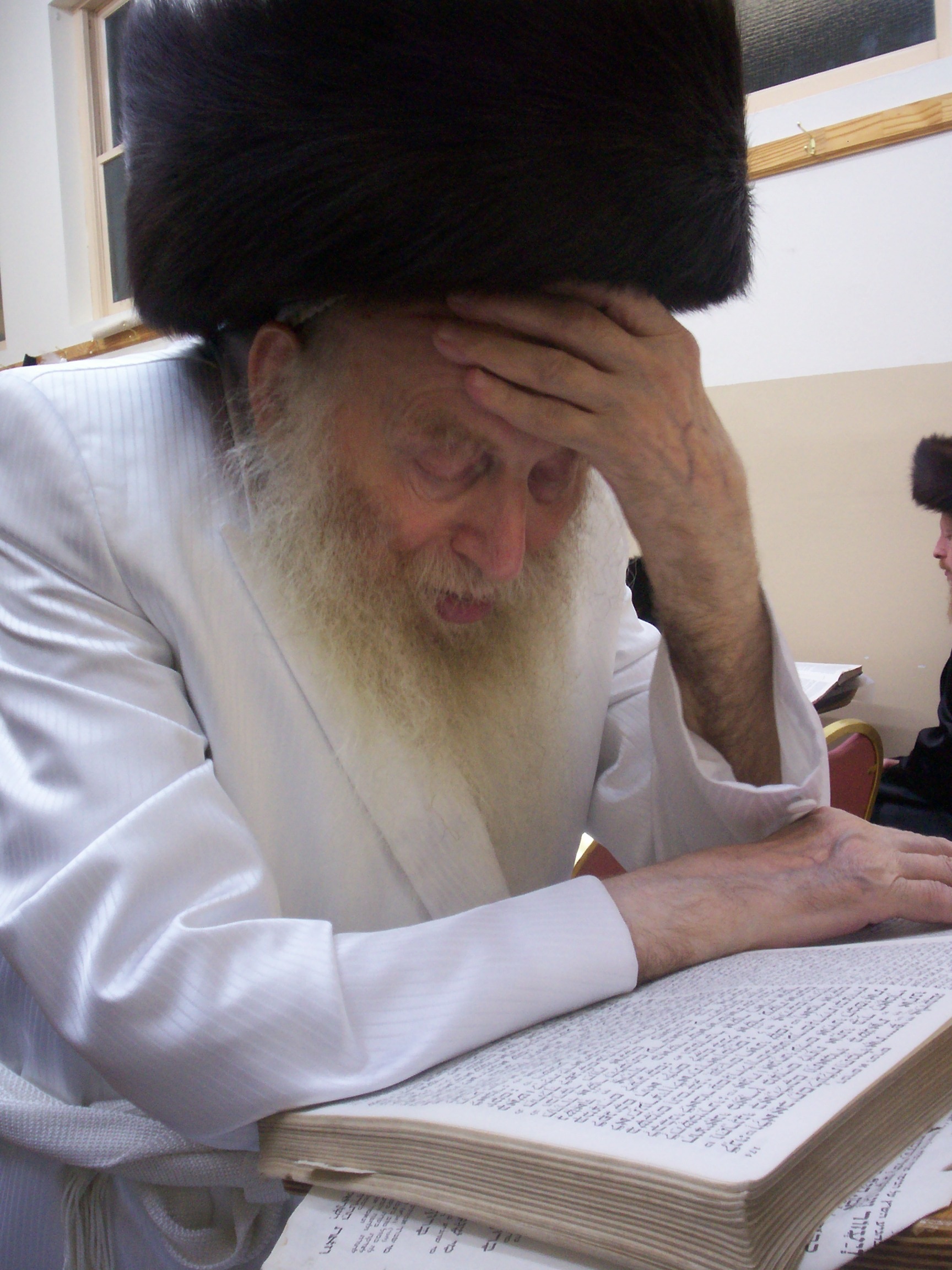
- Rebbe Naftali Tzvi Labin of Ziditshov

Founder
- Rabbi Tzvi Hirsh of Zidichov

Regions with significant populations
- Israel, United States, United Kingdom

Religions
- Hasidic Judaism

Ziditshov is a Hasidic dynasty originating in town Ziditshov (as known in Yiddish; or Zhydachiv in Ukrainian), in Galicia (a province of the former Austro-Hungarian Empire). It was founded by Rebbe Tzvi Hirsh of Ziditshov. Today, the few who remain of the Ziditshov dynasty live in Brooklyn, Monticello, New York, Chicago, Baltimore, London, and Israel.

== Spiritual lineage of the Ziditshov dynasty ==
- Grand Rabbi Yisrael Baal Shem Tov - founder of Hasidism.
  - Grand Rebbe Dov Ber of Mezeritch - the Maggid (Preacher) of Mezritch - disciple of the Baal Shem Tov.
    - Grand Rebbe Elimelech of Lizhensk - author of Noam Elimelech - disciple of the Maggid of Mezritsh.
      - Grand Rabbi Yaakov Yitzchak of Lublin - the Chozeh (Seer) of Lublin - author of Zichron Zos - disciple of the Noam Elimelech.
        - Grand Rabbi Tzvi Hirsh of Ziditshov - author of Ateres Tzvi - disciple of the Chozeh of Lublin.

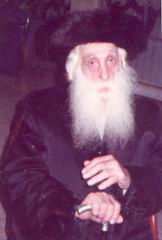
Rabbi Sholom Eichenstein, Ziditshover Rebbe of Tzfat

== The family ==
- Grand Rabbi Yitzchak Isaac Eichenstein of Safrin (1740-1800)
  - Grand Rabbi Tzvi Hirsch of Ziditshov (1763-1831), author of Ateres Tzvi on the Zohar, son of Rabbi Isaac of Safrin
  - Rabbi Moshe Eichenstein of Sambur (d. 1840), author of "Tefilo leMoshe", son of Rabbi Isaac of Safrin
  - Rabbi Yissochor Berish Eichenstein of Safrin (d. 1832), son of Rabbi Yitzchak Isaac of Safrin
    - Rabbi Naftoli Hertzl Labin of Ziditshov, son-in-law of Rabbi Tzvi Hirsch Eichenstein of Ziditshov, the Ateres Tzvi.
    - Rabbi Yitzchak Isaac Eichenstein of Ziditshov (1805-1873), author of Likutei Maharya, only son of Rabbi Yissochor Berish of Safrin
      - Rabbi Shlomo Yaakov Eichenstein of Ziditchov (d. 1886), son of Rabbi Yitzchok
      - Rabbi Nochum of Burshtin
      - Rabbi Eliezer of Burshtin
        - Rabbi Yitzchok Menachem Eichenstein of Burshtin-Podheitz (1879-1943), son of Rabbi Shlomo Yaakov and son-in-law of Rabbi Nochum
          - Rabbi Shlomo Yaakov Zeide Eichenstein of Burshtin (1899-1963), son of Rabbi Yitzchok
            - Rabbi Yitzchok Menachem Eichenshtein, Galanter Rebbe, son of Rabbi Shlomo Yaakov
            - Rabbi Dovid Eichenstein, Burshtiner Rebbe, son of Rabbi Shlomo Yaakov
      - Rabbi Israel Yosef Labin of Ziditshov (d. 1902), son of Rabbi Naftoli Hertsl of Ziditshov, and son-in-law of Rabbi Yitzchok Isaac of Ziditshov
        - Rabbi Moshe Labin of Ziditshov-Drubitsh (d. 1939), son of Rabbi Israel Yosef of Ziditshov
          - Rabbi Alexander Yom Tov Labin of Bergsas, son-in-law of Rabbi Moshe of Drubitsh
            - Rabbi Naftali Tzvi Labin of Ziditshov, son of Rabbi Alexander Yom Tov Labin
              - Rabbi Alexander (Sender) Yom Tov Lipa Labin, son of Rabbi Naftali Tzvi Labin
              - Rabbi Shlomo Dov Labin, Rebbe of Ziditchov-london, son of Rabbi Naftali Tzvi Labin
              - Rabbi Moshe Labin, Drubitsher Rebbe, son of Rabbi Naftali Tzvi Labin
              - Rabbi Yeshaya Labin, Zidichover Rebbe son of Rabbi Naftali Tzvi Labin
              - Rabbi Aharon Maier Labin, Bolchav Rebbe in Williamsburg, son of Rabbi Naftali Tzvi Labin
              - Rabbi Yitzchak Isaac Labin, Ziditchover Rov in Bnei Brak, son of Rabbi Naftali Tzvi Labin
              - Rebbetzin Hinda Kohn, daughter of Rabbi Naftali Tzvi Labin, wife of Rebbe Dovid Kohn, Toldos Aharon Rebbe in Jerusalem
              - Rebbetzin Esther Malka Segal-Loewy, daughter of Rabbi Naftali Tzvi Labin, wife of Rabbi Elimelech Segal-Loewy of Tosh — son of Rebbe Meshulam Feish
      - Rabbi Alexander (Sender) Yom Tov Lipa Eichenstein of Zidachov (1824-October 12, 1883), son of Rabbi Yitzchok Isaac of Ziditshov
        - Rabbi Yehoshia Heshl Eichenstein of Khodorov, son of Rabbi Alexander Yom Tov Lipa of Ziditshov
          - Rabbi Yisochor Berish Eichenstein of Khodorov (d. 1918), son of Rabbi Yehoshia Heshl of Khodorov
            - Grand Rabbi Yehoshua Heshl Eichenstein of Ziditshov-Chicago (moved from Galitzia to Chicago in 1922) (d. 1940), son of Rabbi Yisochor Berish of Khodorov
              - Grand Rabbi Avrohom Eichenstein of Ziditshov-Chicago (d. 1967), son of Rabbi Yehoshua
                - Grand Rabbi Yehoshua Heshl Eichenstein of Ziditshov-Chicago, (died June 31st 2024)son of Rabbi Avrohom
                  - Rabbi Pinchos Eichenstein of Chodrov-Chicago, son of Rabbi Yehoshua Heshl (II) of Chicago.
                  - Rabbi Yissocher Dov Eichenstein of Zidichov Baltimore, son of Rabbi Yehoshua Heshl (II) of Chicago
                  - Rabbi Yecheskal Eichenstein of Zidichoov Marine Park Brooklyn, son of Rabbi Yehoshua Heshl (II) of Chicago
                  - Rabbi Zalman Leib Eichenstein of Zidichov Chicago, son of Rabbi Yehoshua Heshl (II) of Chicago.
              - Chief Rabbi Menachem Tsvi Eichenstein, of St Louis (1943–1982), son of Rabbi Yehoshua Heshl (I) of Chicago
                - Rabbi Dov Ber Alter Eichenstein, son of Rabbi Menachem
                  - Rabbi Moshe Mordechei Eichenstein of Trisk (born August 7, 1958, at Jerusalem), son of Rabbi Dov Ber Alter
        - Rabbi Yisochor Berish Eichenstein of Veretzky (1848-1924), author of the Malbush L'Shabbos V'Yom Tov, son of Rabbi Alexander Yom Tov Lipa of Ziditshov
          - Rabbi Usher Yeshaya Eichenstein of Prochnik, son of Rabbi Yisochor Berish Eichenstein of Veretzky
            - Rabbi Yehoshua Eichenstein Ziditshover Rebbe of Grosswardein, son of Rabbi Usher Yeshaya Eichenstein of Prochnik and son-in-law of Rabbi Chaim Yitzchok Yeruchem of Aldstadt
              - Rabbi Nosson Eichenstein of Tel Aviv, son of Rabbi Yehoshua Eichenstein of Grosswardein and son in law of Rav Shmaryohu Gurari
              - Rabbi Yissochor Berish Eichenstein, Ziditshover Rebbe in Petach Tikvah, son of Rabbi Yehoshua Eichenstein
              - Mrs. Bluma Horowitz, daughter of Rabbi Yehoshua Eichenstein, wife of Rabbi Feivel Horowitz
              - Mrs. Riva Rubin, daughter of Rabbi Yehoshua Eichenstein, wife of Rabbi Simcha Rubin of Tomashov
              - Mrs. Mirel Rubin, daughter of Rabbi Yehoshua Eichenstein, wife of Rabbi Mordche Dovid Rubin of Sasregen
              - Mrs. Sara Zevald, daughter of Rabbi Yehoshua Eichenstein, wife of Rabbi Moshe Zevald
            - Rabbi Menashe Yitzchok Meir Eichenstein, Ziditshover Rebbe of Petah Tikva, son of Rabbi Usher Yeshaya Eichenstein of Prochnik
            - Rabbi Sholom Eichenstein (1901‑1987), Ziditshover Rebbe of Tzfat, son of Rabbi Usher Yeshaya Eichenstein
              - Rabbi Yisochor Berish Eichenstein(1924-1999), Ziditshover-Apter Rebbe, Borough Park son of Rabbi Sholom Eichenstein. Son-in-law of Grand Rabbi Levy Yitzchok Leifer the Nadvorner-Chaifa Rebbe.
                - Rabbi Yosef Meir Eichenstein, son of Rabbi Yisochor Berish Eichenstein
                - Rabbi Chaim Eichenstein, son of Rabbi Yisochor Berish Eichenstein
                - Rabbi Yehosha Moshe Eichenstein, son of Rabbi Yisochor Berish Eichenstein
                - Rebbitzen Chana Hollander, Daughter of Rabbi Yisochor Berish Eichenstein
                  - Rabbi Shaul Yedidia Elezar Rosen son of Rebbitzen Chana Hollander
              - Rabbi Usher Yeshaya Eichenstein (1934-2008), son of Rabbi Sholom Eichenstein and son-in-law of Rabbi Moshe Aryeh Lev, Rav of Temeshvar
                - Rabbi Chaim Yehoshua Eichenstein, Zidichover Rebbe, son of Rabbi Usher Yeshaya Eichenstein
                - Rabbi Yitzchak Isaac Shneebalg, Ziditshover Rebbe of Be'er Sheva, grandson of Rabbi Sholom Eichenstein
      - Rabbi Yisochor Berish Eichenstein of Dolyna (d. 1886), son of Rabbi Yitzchak Isaac of Ziditshov
      - Rabbi Eliyohu Eichenstein of Ziditshov (1837-1878), son of Rabbi Yitzchak Isaac of Ziditshov
      - Rabbi Menachem Mendel Eichenstein of Ziditshov (1840-1901), son of Rabbi Yitzchak Isaac of Ziditshov

The Rebbe Avroham Eichenstein is the father-in-law of the Novominsker Rebbe Zt"l, and of Harav Moshe Meiselman shlita.

There is also Rabbi Alter Kahane of Ziditshov, who is a scion of the Spinka dynasty.

== Main books of Ziditshover Hasidism ==
The main books of the Ziditshov dynasty are:

- Ateres Tzvi by Tzvi Hirsh of Ziditshov.
- Sur Meiro Va'asei Tov by Tzvi Hirsh of Ziditshov.

== Rebbes of Ziditshov ==
- Tzvi Hirsh of Zidichov
- Yitzchak Isaac of Zidichov
- Naftali Tzvi Labin of Ziditshov

== See also ==
- Burshtin (Hasidic dynasty)
- Veretzky (Rabbinical dynasty)
- Komarno (Hasidic dynasty)
