= Ettie Steinberg =

Irish Holocaust victim

- Born: Esther Steinberg; 11 January 1914; Veretsky, Carpathian Ruthenia, Austria-Hungary (modern Nyzhni Vorota, Ukraine)
- Died: 4 September 1942 (aged 28); Auschwitz concentration camp, General Government, Nazi Germany (in modern Poland)
- Spouse: Vogtjeck Gluck (m. 1937–1942)
- Children: 1

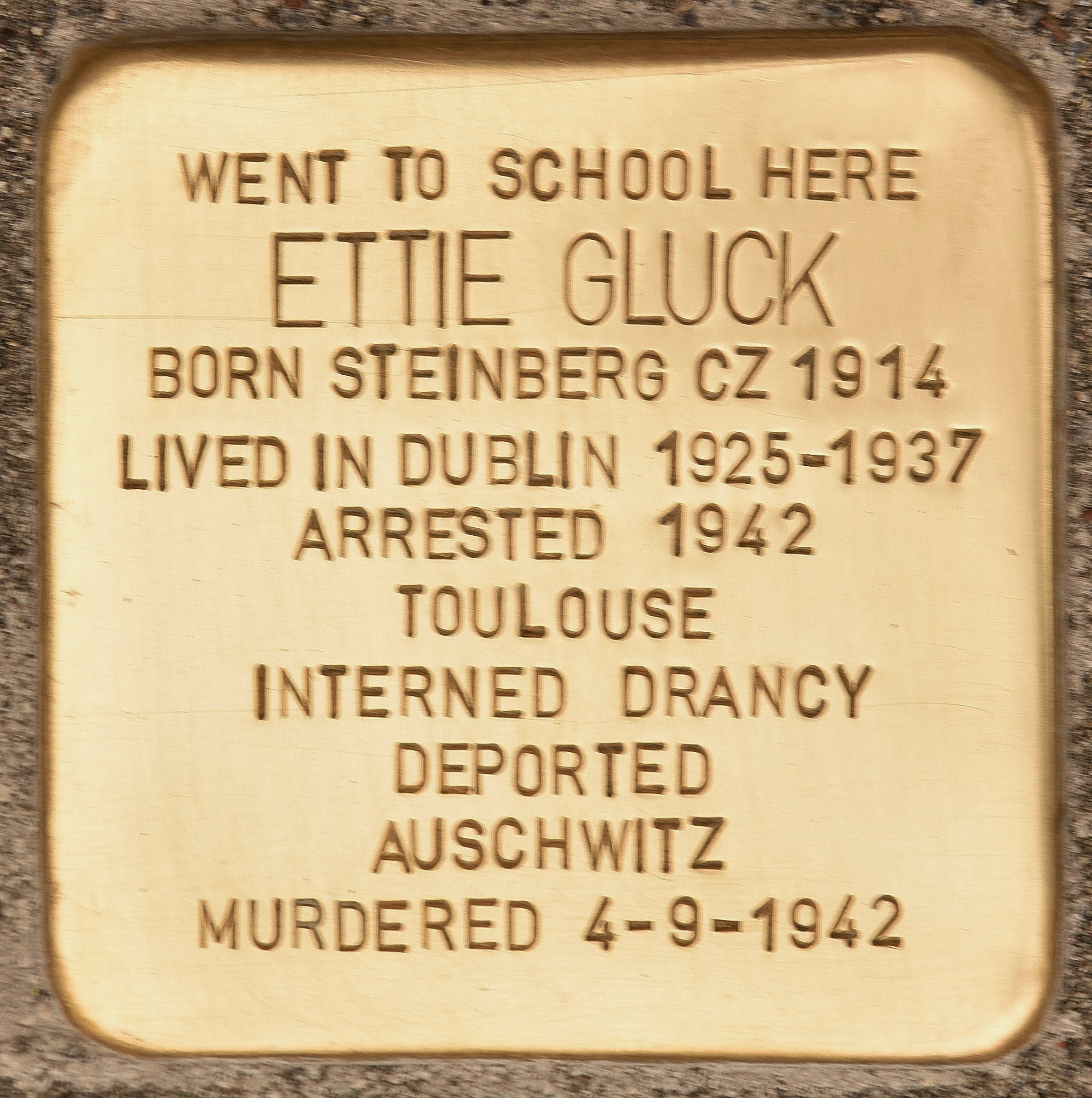
Stolperstein in Dublin; her birthplace is given as "CZ" (Czechoslovakia) because that's where Veretsky was located in the interwar period.

Esther "Ettie" Steinberg (11 January 1914 – c. 4 September 1942; married name Ettie Gluck) was one of only a few Irish Jews murdered in the Holocaust.

== Early life ==
Steinberg was born to Aaron Hirsh Steinberg and Bertha Roth, on 11 January 1914, in Veretsky, Austria-Hungary; the family moved to Dublin in 1925. Her family included six siblings and lived at 28 Raymond Street, off the South Circular Road in Dublin. They were educated in St Catherine's School, opposite to the top of Dufferin Avenue.

== Life ==
Steinberg worked as a seamstress in Dublin where she met and married Belgian Vogtjeck Gluck in Greenville Hall synagogue in Dublin on 22 July 1937. The couple returned to his home in Antwerp. However the rising tensions of the Nazi actions meant they moved to be further away, and Leon, their son, was born in Paris.

== Death ==
They continued to flee the approaching Germans and eventually succeeded in gaining visas to travel to Northern Ireland, arranged by the Steinberg family in Dublin. However the papers arrived a day too late. The family were rounded up and put on a train to Auschwitz.

Clearly aware of what the danger was, Steinberg wrote a postcard to her family and threw it from the train. It read "Uncle Lechem, we did not find, but we found Uncle Tisha B'Av" which meant "we did not find bread (Hebrew לחם), but we found destruction (תשעה באב, a holiday that marks several tragedies in Jewish history)." A stranger found the postcard and posted it. Steinberg, her husband and her son arrived at Auschwitz on 4 September 1942 and were immediately murdered in the gas chambers.

== Memorials ==
A memorial to her is at a secondary school in Malahide, Co Dublin, as well as at the Irish Jewish Museum in Portobello, Dublin. In June 2022, a Stolperstein memorial was placed outside her primary school on Donore Avenue, along with similar markings for her husband, son, and three other Irish Jews murdered in the Holocaust.
