= Sefer ha-Chinuch =

Rabbinic text discussing the 613 commandments of the Torah

- ספר החינוך

Information
- Religion: Judaism
- Author: Anonymous "Levite of Barcelona"
- Language: Hebrew
- Period: 13th century
- Sefer ha-Chinuch at Hebrew Wikisource

Sefer ha-Chinuch (Hebrew: ספר החינוך, "Book of Education") is a rabbinic text which systematically discusses the 613 commandments of the Torah. It was written in 13th-century Spain by an anonymous "Levite of Barcelona".

== Content ==
The work's enumeration of the commandments (Hebrew: mitzvot; sing. mitzvah) is based upon Maimonides' system of counting as per his Sefer Hamitzvot; each is listed according to its appearance in the weekly Torah portion and the work is structured correspondingly.

The book separately discusses each of the 613 commandments, both from a legal and a moral perspective. For each, the Chinuch's discussion starts by linking the mitzvah to its Biblical source, and then addresses the philosophical underpinnings of the commandment (here, termed the "shoresh", or "root"). Following this, the Chinuch presents a brief overview of the halakha (practical Jewish law) governing its observance - based on Maimonides' Mishneh Torah, while cross referencing the Talmudic tractate in question - and closes with a summary as to the commandment's applicability.

Because of this structure, the work remains popular to this day. The philosophic portions are widely quoted and taught, while the legal discussion provides the basis for much further study in yeshivot. The Minchat Chinuch by "Rabbeinu Yosef" (Yosef Ben Moshe Babad, 1800–1874), Av Beit Din of Ternopil, serves as a legal commentary.

== Authorship ==
The author does not reveal his name in any manuscript, writing only that he is a "Jew of the House of Levi in Barcelona". Scholars have proposed various attributions.

=== Aaron ===
The editio princeps (Venice, 1523) attributes the book to "Aaron", on the basis of a purported hint within the text, but scholars have rejected this interpretation. Relying on the editio princeps, Gedaliah ibn Yaḥyah (Shalshelet haQabbalah (c. 1550)) went further, suggesting that it might have been written by Aaron HaLevi of Barcelona (1235-c. 1303). However, there are numerous contradictions between the Chinuch and HaLevi's works, and HaLevi's teacher (Nachmanides) is not cited by the Chinuch. Adolf Jellinek (1878) argues that "Aaron" is correct, but that it is a different Aaron HaLevi.

=== Other Proposals ===
David ibn Abi Zimra (Metzudat David (1556)) attributes it to a certain "Rabbi Barukh", without giving his source. Adolf Neubauer (1872) attributes it to Abraham ben Hassan HaLevi. Shaul Chana Kook (1940) suggests the author's name was Mordechai HaLevi. Israel Ta-Shma argues that the Aharon HaLevi's brother, Pinchas ben Joseph haLevi, composed the book.

== See also ==
- Sefer Mitzvot Gadol
- Sefer Mitzvot Katan
- Sefer Hamitzvot
