= Naftali Tzvi Labin of Ziditshov =

Polish-born American rabbi

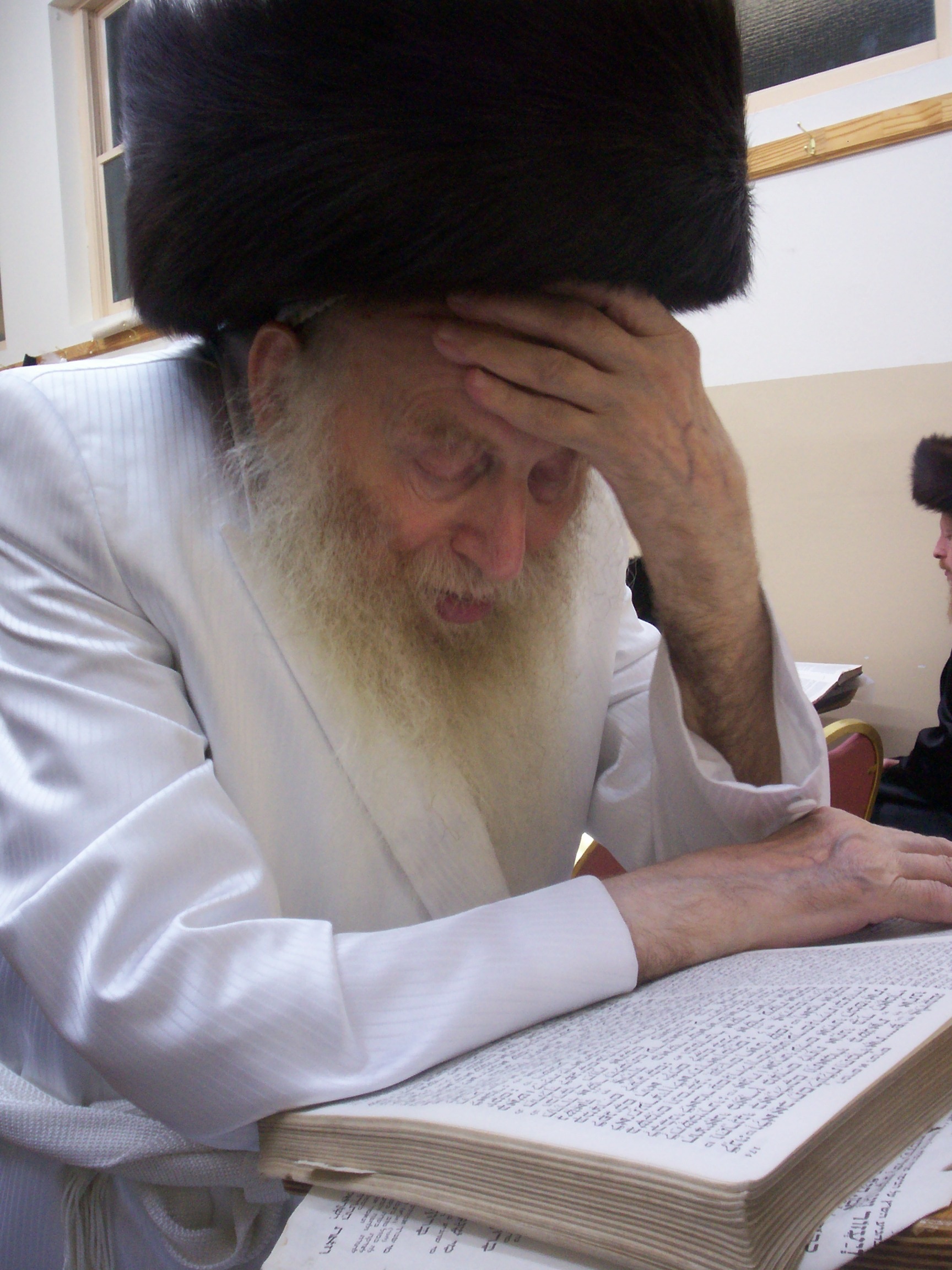
- Naftali Tzvi Labin of Ziditshov
- Title: Ziditshoiver Rebbe

Personal life
- Born: Naftali Tzvi Labin c. 1916 Zhydachiv
- Died: March 6, 2009 (aged 92–93)
- Spouse: Labin
- Children: Alexander Yom Tov Lipa; Shlomo Dov; Moshe; Yeshaya; Aharon Maier; Yitzchak Isaac; Hinda; Esther Malka
- Parent: Alexander Yom Tov Lipa Labin (father)
- Dynasty: Zidichov

Religious life
- Religion: Judaism

Jewish leader
- Successor: Grand Rabbi Yeshaya Labin
- Dynasty: Zidichov

Naftali (also spelled Naftula) Tzvi Labin of Zidichov (נפתלי צבי לאבין מזידיטשוב) (c. 1916 – March 6, 2009) was the Zidichover Rebbe. He was born in Ziditshoiv, Ukraine, which was then a province of the former Austro-Hungarian Empire, His father was a descendant of Rabbi Zvi Hirsch of Zidichov and one of his successors. He later replanted the movement in London, and then in Brooklyn and Monticello, New York, United States.

Labin was very close to many rebbes of the previous generation, including Rabbi Yoel Teitelbaum of Satmar, Rabbi Aharon Rokeach of Belz, Rebbe Moshe Yitzchak Gevirtzman (Reb Itzikl) of Pshevorsk, and Rebbe Yaakov Leiser (Reb Yankele) of Pshevorsk.

== Zidichov today ==
After the Rebbe of Ziditchov, Naftali Tzvi Labin, died, his son Rabbi Yeshaya Labin was crowned as Grand Rebbe of Ziditchov.

== Aphorism ==
"If you listen to, and you do what and when evil wants you to do, evil owns you. If you say to evil ok I’ll do it, 'just let me have 5 minutes before doing it' you are still his friend, but he does not own you."

== Children ==
- Rabbi Sender Lipa Labin
- Rabbi Shlomo Dov Labin, rabbi of Zidichov-London
- Rabbi Moshe Labin, Chareidim-Drubitsher Rebbe
- Rabbi Yeshaya Labin, Zidichover Rabbi
- Rabbi Aharon Maier Labin, Bolchav Rov in Williamsburg
- Rabbi Yitzchak Isaac Labin, Zidichover Rebbe in Bnei Brak

Rabbi Labin also has two daughters, both married to Hasidic rebbes:

- Hinda, who died in 2022 at the age of 74, was the wife of the Rebbe Dovid Kohn–the present Toldos Aharon Rebbe in Jerusalem
- Esther, wife of Rabbi Elimelech Segal-Loewy, who succeed his father Meshulam Feish as Tosh Rebbe upon the latter's death in 2015
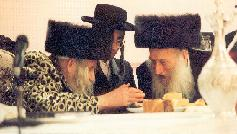
The Ziditchover Rebbe (right) with the Tosher Rebbe

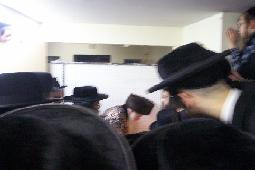
The Ziditchover Rebbe lighting the Hanukkah candles

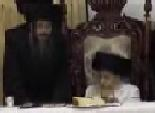
Rabbi Elimelech Segal-Loewy (left), son-in-law of the Zidichover Rebbe, standing next to his father, the Tosher Rebbe (seated)
