= Midwood, Brooklyn =

Neighborhood in New York City

Midwood
- Neighborhood of Brooklyn
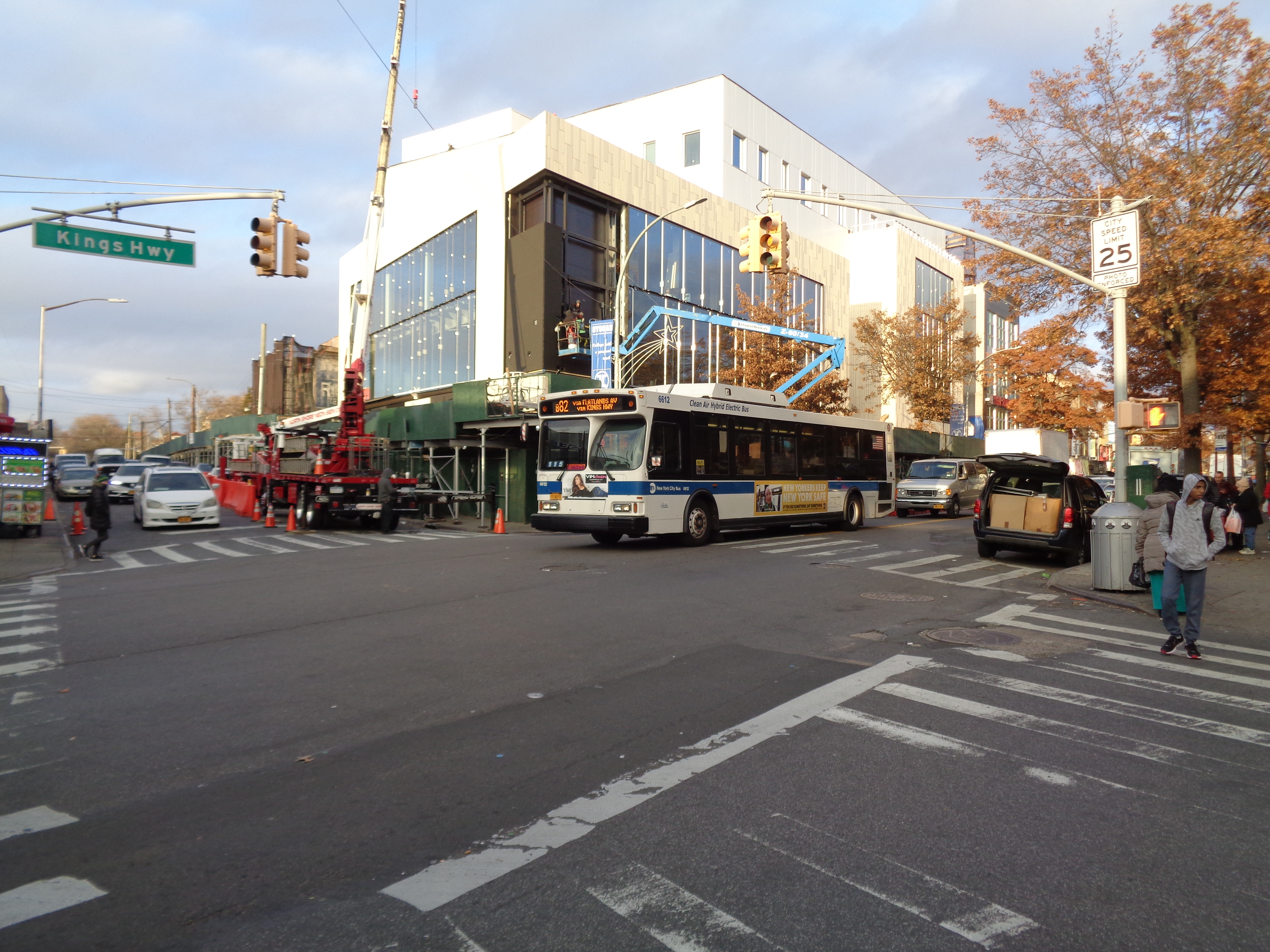
- Kings Highway and East 16th Street in Midwood
- Interactive map of Midwood
- Coordinates: 40.623°N 73.962°W
- Country: United States
- State: New York
- City: New York City
- Borough: Brooklyn
- Community District: Brooklyn 14

Area
  - Total: 1.29 sq mi (3.33 km^{2})

Population (2020)
  - Total: 54,637
  - Density: 42,500/sq mi (16,400/km^{2})
- Time zone: UTC−5 (Eastern)
  - Summer (DST): UTC−4 (EDT)
- ZIP Codes: 11210, 11230
- Area code: 718, 347, 929, and 917

Midwood is a neighborhood in the south-central part of the New York City borough of Brooklyn. It is bounded on the north by the Bay Ridge Branch tracks just above Avenue I and by the Brooklyn College campus of the City University of New York, and on the south by Avenue P and Kings Highway. The eastern border consists of parts of Nostrand Avenue, Flatbush Avenue, and Coney Island Avenue; parts of McDonald Avenue and Ocean Parkway mark the western boundary.

Midwood is part of Brooklyn Community District 14, and its primary ZIP Codes are 11210 and 11230. It is patrolled by the 70th Precinct of the New York City Police Department. Politically, Midwood is represented by the New York City Council's 44th, 45th, and 48th districts.

== History ==
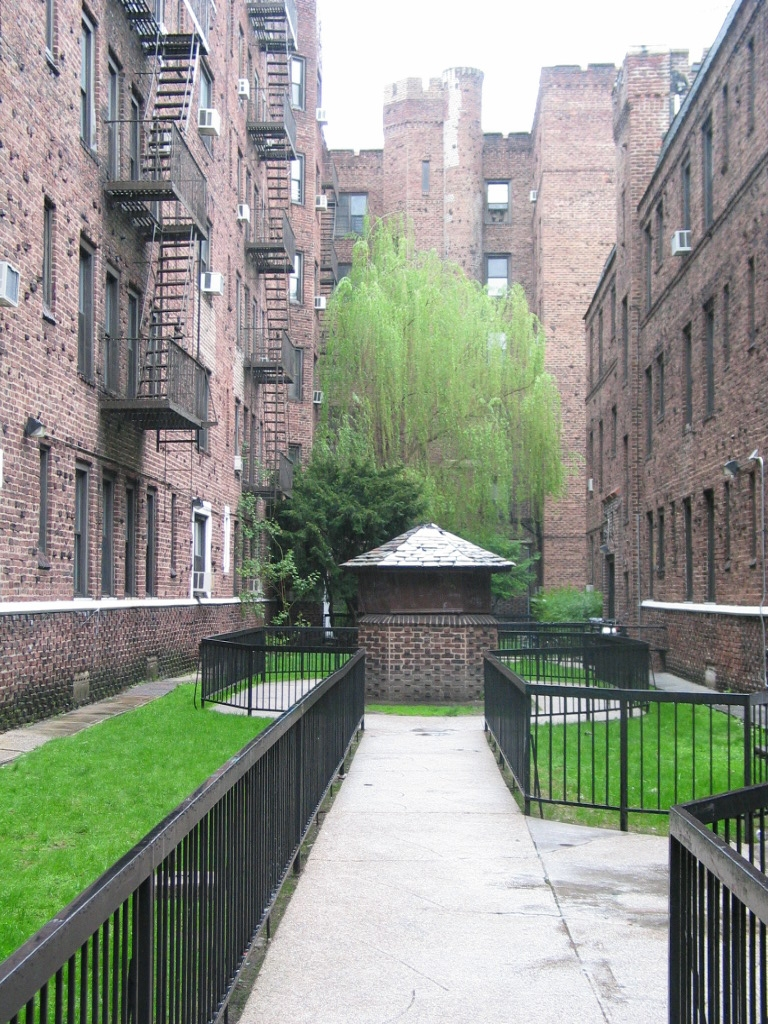
Residential building cluster in Midwood

The name "Midwood" derives from the Middle Dutch Midwout (middle woods; Modern Dutch: Midwoud), the name the settlers of New Netherland called the area of dense woodland midway between the towns of Boswyck (Bushwick) and Breukelen (Brooklyn). Jan Snedeker, Jan Stryker, and Tomys Swartwout solicited from Director-General Stuyvesant the right of settling together on a level area of wilderness (vlacke bosch, the flat bush), adjacent to the outlying farms at Breukelen and Nieuw Amersfoort. Through Swartwout's suggestion, the settlement was named the village of Midwout or Midwolde. In April 1655, Stuyvesant and the Council of New Netherland appointed Swartwout a schepen (magistrate), to serve with Snedeker and Adriaen Hegeman as the Court of Midwout.

Later, it became part of old Flatbush, situated between the towns of Gravesend and Flatlands.

Settlement was begun by the Dutch in 1652; they later gave way to the English, who conquered it in 1664, but the area remained rural and undeveloped for the most part until its annexation to the City of Brooklyn in the 1890s. It became more developed in the 1920s when large middle class housing tracts and apartment buildings were built.

Many residents refer to Midwood as "Flatbush", or as being "part of Flatbush", an older and more established neighborhood and former township, which in the 19th century included modern Midwood. The usage of Flatbush to mean Midwood dates to the period when the neighborhood was first formed, and known as South Greenfield.

Many also consider the nearby neighborhood of Fiske Terrace/Midwood Gardens to be part of Midwood, but, as in many cities, neighborhood boundaries in Brooklyn are somewhat fluid and poorly defined.

== Demographics ==
Based on data from the 2020 United States Census, the population of Midwood was 52,835. The racial makeup of the neighborhood was 73.6% White, 11.8% Asian, 7.6% Hispanic/Latino, 4.6% Black and 2.4% Other. There were 16% of residents over the age of 65.

The entirety of Community Board 14, which comprises Flatbush and Midwood, had 165,543 inhabitants as of NYC Health's 2018 Community Health Profile, with an average life expectancy of 82.4 years. This is slightly higher than the median life expectancy of 81.2 for all New York City neighborhoods. Most inhabitants are middle-aged adults and youth: 25% are between the ages of 0–17, 29% between 25–44, and 24% between 45–64. The ratio of college-aged and elderly residents was lower, at 9% and 13% respectively.

As of 2016, the median household income in Community Board 14 was $56,599. In 2018, an estimated 22% of Flatbush and Midwood residents lived in poverty, compared to 21% in all of Brooklyn and 20% in all of New York City. One in eleven residents (9%) were unemployed, compared to 9% in the rest of both Brooklyn and New York City. Rent burden, or the percentage of residents who have difficulty paying their rent, is 57% in Flatbush and Midwood, higher than the citywide and boroughwide rates of 52% and 51% respectively. Based on this calculation, as of 2018, Flatbush and Midwood are considered to be high-income relative to the rest of the city and not gentrifying.

== Character ==
=== Shopping ===
The main shopping streets in the area are Kings Highway, Avenue J, Avenue M, Flatbush Avenue, Nostrand Avenue, and Coney Island Avenue.

==== Kings Highway ====
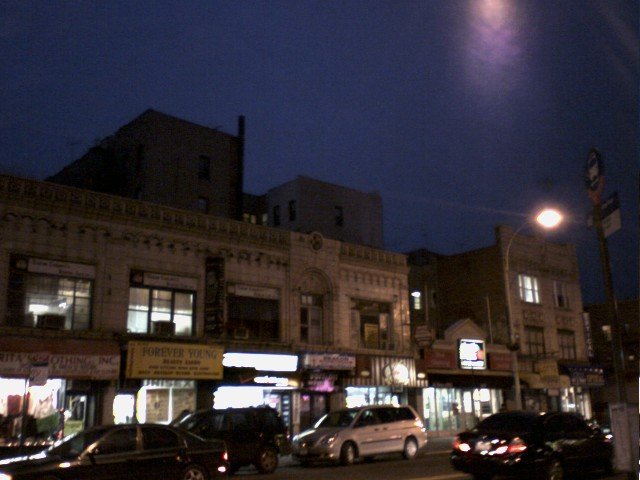
A Midwood shopping street at night

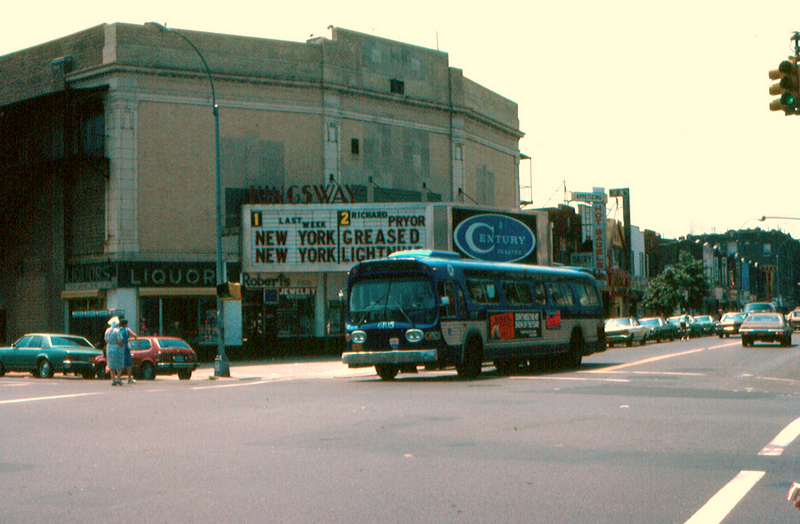
Kingsway Theatre circa 1977

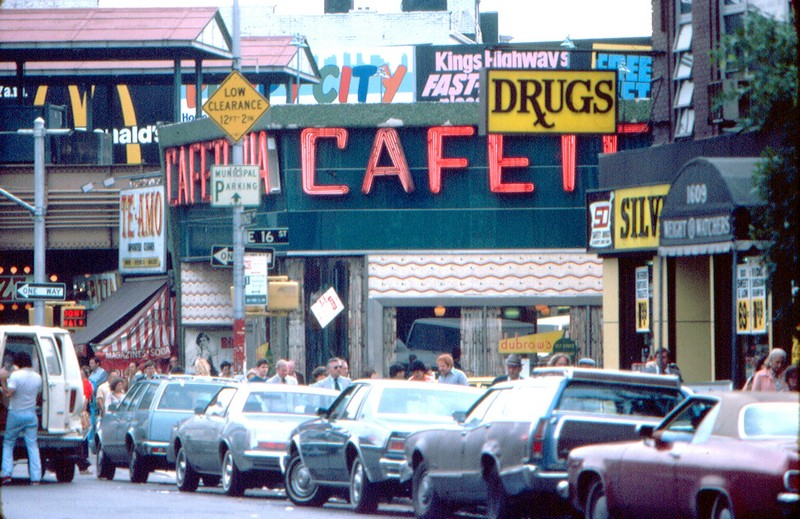
Dubrow's Cafeteria

In the 1950s through the 1970s, Kings Highway had Dubrow's Cafeteria, a classic cafeteria where holes would be punched in patrons' printed tickets, which would total the cost of the meal. In his run for the White House, Democratic presidential candidate John F. Kennedy held a campaign rally just outside Dubrow's Cafeteria. Years later, his brother Senator Robert F. Kennedy ("Bobby") held a similar campaign rally there for his run for President.

In the fall of 2008, the NYCDOT planned to implement an experimental congestion parking plan in the Kings Highway Business District, which would have raised parking meter rates from 75 cents to as much as $2.50 an hour. Specific streets were not then designated.

Kings Highway is currently anchored by several chain stores and multiple ethnic food stores. Unique businesses include several high fashion outlets, jewelry stores, and sushi restaurants.

The first Original Crazy Eddie store was located on Kings Highway, then moved to larger quarters just south of Kings Highway on Coney Island Avenue.

==== Nostrand Avenue ====
Nostrand Avenue was known for fashionable boutiques and took its place as one of New York's most upscale shopping destinations (even being the cover story of New York Magazine as a secret oasis for fashion). Once a distribution warehouse for a clothing line, Burton's started opening its doors to the public in 1956 for one-off sales events to reduce inventory. Seeing the success of Burtons, Bernie Greenstone and his wife Margarette decided to find a small retail space on the block, located between Avenues M and N to open the soon-to-be famous Children’s clothing store, "Greenstone's" which was first established in 1919 by Margarette's parents until their retirement. Using the same name Greenstone's opened in 1956 and operated at 2750 Nostrand Avenue for 37 years - expanding 3 times. Burtons decided to open 6 days a week (Mon-Sat) and Greenstone's followed suit. Shortly thereafter other stores opened, such as Edna Nelken's Jewelry, The Shirtbox, The Bounty Shop menswear and dozens of other high fashion stores. The block continued to flourish until Burton's - the largest of the stores - closed citing union labor costs. Burton's lay dormant until the Plaza Honda and Oldsmobile showroom opened. This automotive retail entry made parking virtually impossible for customers to find parking spaces and eventually stores closed, and Plaza expanded by taking over virtually all retail space on both sides of the Avenue. Greenstone's closed, but Greenstones et Cie (Greenstones & Co.) still exists on Columbus Avenue and West 82nd Street in Manhattan - counting as one of New York City's longest operating children's clothing stores in New York ... from 1919 until today.

As retailers retired, the street changed and became known for its automobile showrooms. A U.S. Postal Service facility (Zip Code 11210) can be found on Nostrand Avenue between Avenues I and J.

==== Lettered avenues ====
Avenue J is a major business street in Midwood, with many kosher restaurants, deli, pizzerias, and butchers.

Avenue M, another one of the major business streets of Midwood, is a central location for kosher food and butchers. While in the past it was home to Cookie's, one of Brooklyn's best known restaurants and hang-outs (also popular with the NBC studio staff), today there are no fewer than ten kosher restaurants and three kosher bakeries. From the 1920s through the 1940s, the Dorman Square Restaurant was popular with the Vitagraph studios employees, as well as playing a role in a Vitagraph film or two.

Until the 1970s, Avenue M had its own movie theater. One of Brooklyn's Italian restaurants, Restaurant Bonaparte, also catered to the actors and actresses working on Avenue M in the NBC studios at that time. Restaurant Bonaparte was known for its "Three Musketeers". It also had a wishing well fountain in its lobby entrance, filled with customers' coins. The Avenue has an elevated subway station. Near the end of June each year, the Midwood Development Corporation hosts the popular Midwood Mardi Gras Street Fair along the Avenue, from East 12th Street to Ocean Avenue.

Shoppers can find a municipal muni-meter parking lot on East 17th Street at Chestnut Avenue just north of Avenue M. Many of the retail businesses are closed on Jewish holidays.

==== Coney Island Avenue ====
On Coney Island Avenue in Midwood, primarily between Avenue H and Avenue P, are the U.S. Postal Service Midwood station (Zip Code 11230), The Kent Triplex Movie Theater, and other retailers.

Between Avenue O and Quentin Road are Turkish restaurants and a hookah bar.

The United States' largest kosher supermarket opened at the corner of Avenue L and Coney Island Avenue in August 2008.

=== Ocean Parkway ===
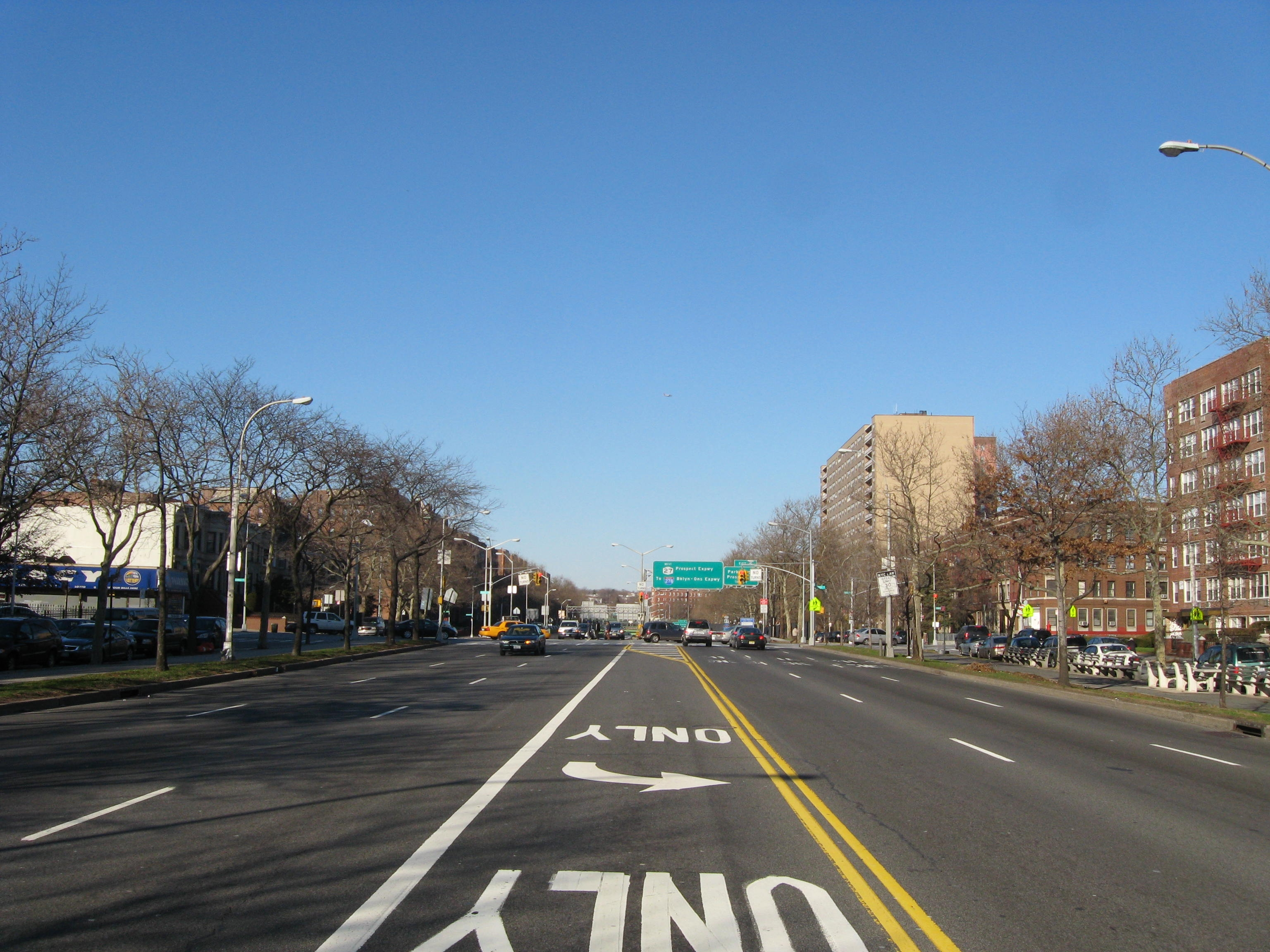
Ocean Parkway

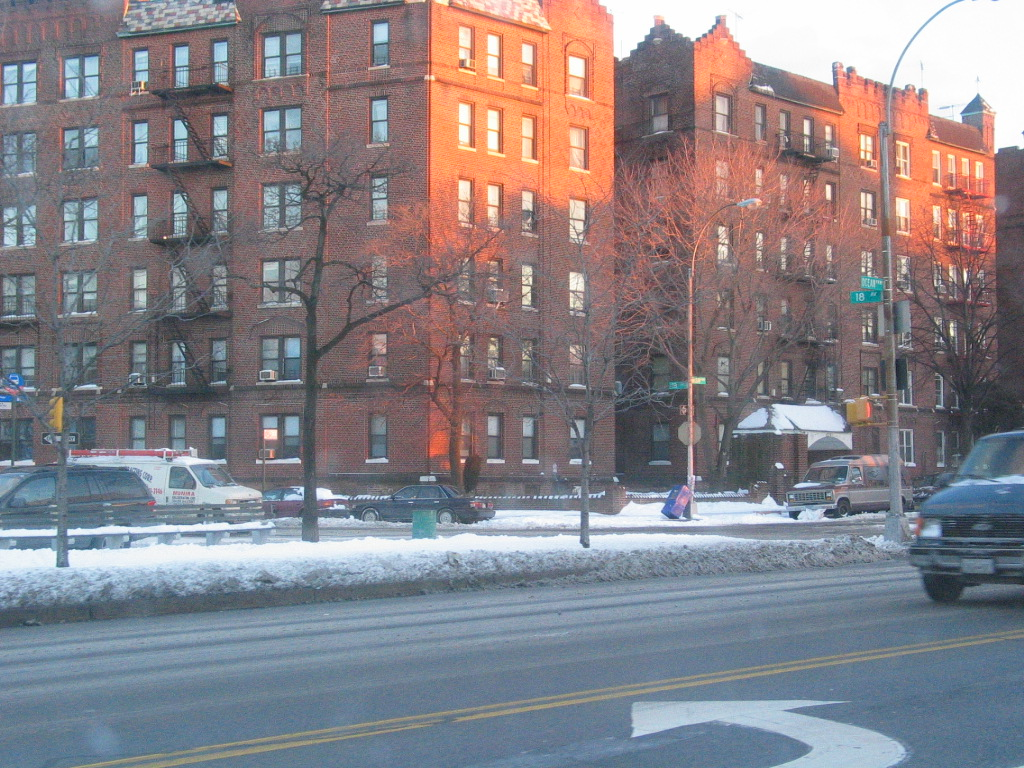
Ocean Parkway apartment buildings

Ocean Parkway is a major tree-lined Brooklyn boulevard, largely featuring apartment houses. It is not a shopping district. Local one-way traffic lanes are separated from the main roadway by bicycle lanes and running paths. Most avenues continue from one side to the other; Avenue K doesn't. Ryder Avenue and Roder do neither: Though they are the same one-way road, their names differ by one letter. Ryder begins at McDonald Avenue, reaches Ocean Parkway, disappears on the opposite for one short block, then continues as Roder, ending at Coney Island Avenue.

=== Movie theaters ===
Midwood had several movie theaters, now mostly closed:

- One, still on Coney Island Ave, near Ave. H, is The Kent Triplex Movie Theater. It was built in 1939 with a single screen, becoming a triplex in the early 1990s.
- One was on Ave. M, the Century Elm, later an Emigrant Savings Bank branch and now an Apple Bank branch.
- Four of them were on Kings Highway:
  - The Kingsway
  - The Jewel
  - The Avalon (closed in 1982)
  - The Triangle theatre, which opened in 1936, closed in 1952, subsequently "became a furniture store and by 2019 was a clothing store." It was located across from Sgt. Joyce Kilmer Triangle.

==== Avalon Theater ====
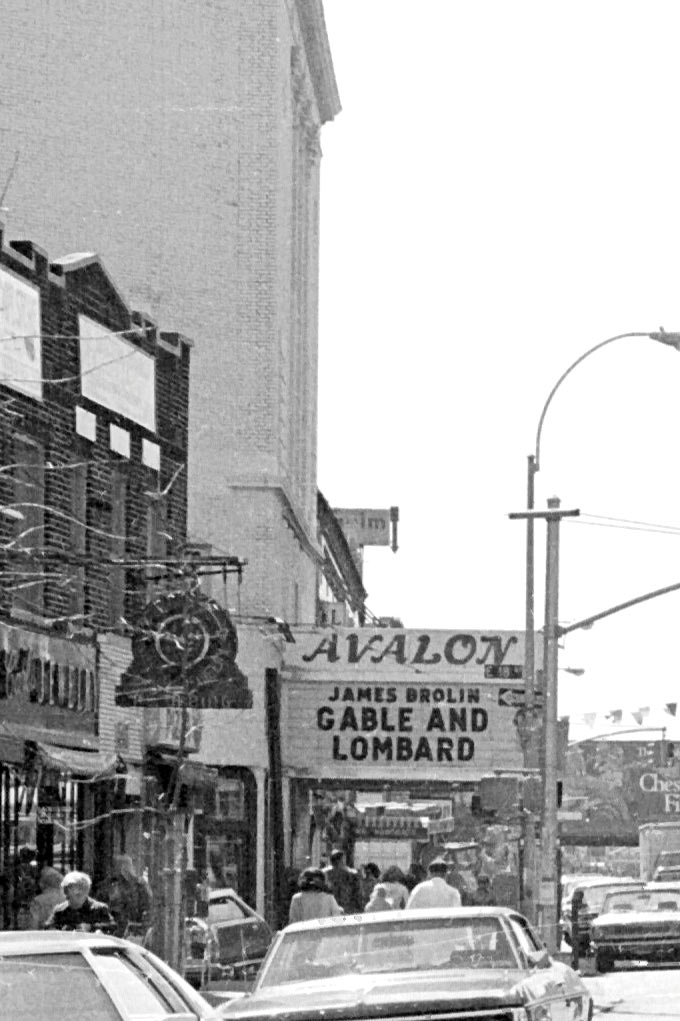
The Avalon Theater (seen here in 1976), formerly the Piccadilly, was designed by Samuel Cohen.

The Avalon Theater opened on January 25, 1928, and was located on Kings Highway at the southwest corner of East 18th Street. Originally built by a local Brooklyn company as the Piccadilly, it was sold prior to opening to Loews Theaters, which changed the name to Avalon. Designed by Samuel Cohen, the combined auditoriums (the main or lobby floor and the upstairs or balcony) seated 2,119 which included on the lobby floor a separate seating for children. It also featured a Robert Morton theatre pipe organ. Within a year of opening, it became part of the Century Theatres chain.

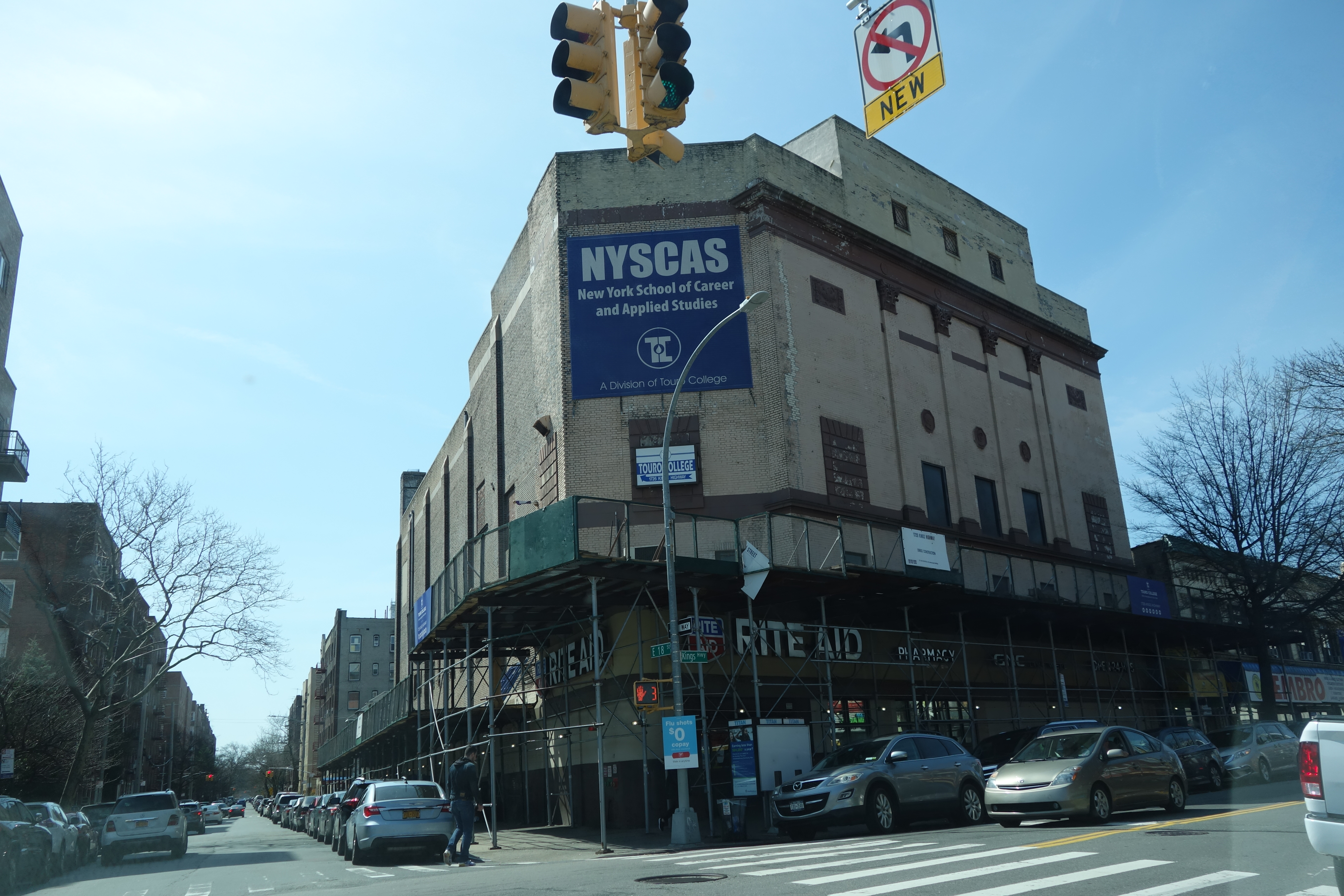
Former Avalon Theater, East 18th street, Kings Highway; now a Walgreens

The theater closed in 1982, and the building now houses a Walgreens on the ground floor, and offices on the upper floors.

=== East Midwood ===
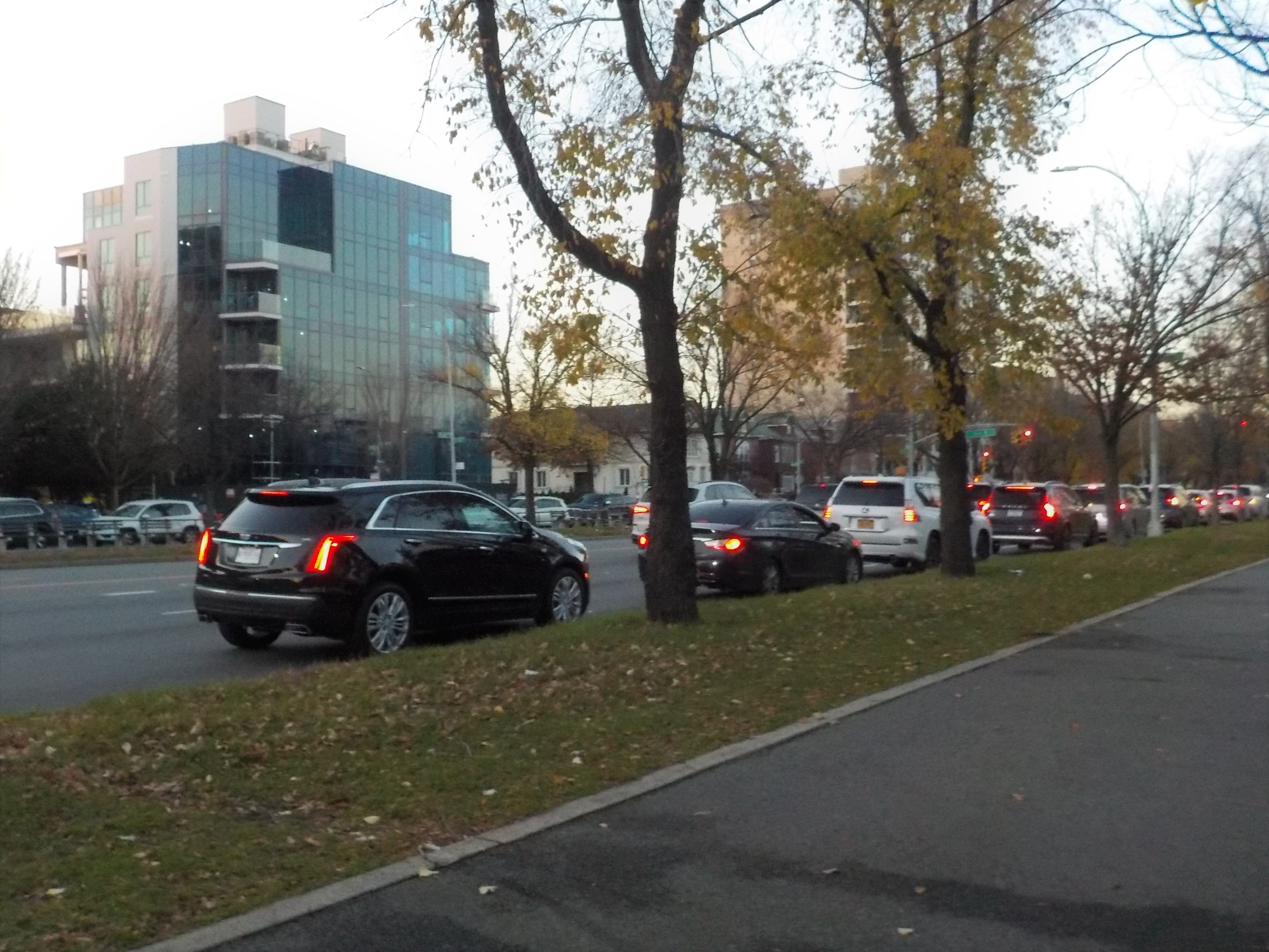
Ocean Parkway in Midwood

The area east of Ocean Avenue is also known as "East Midwood". The volunteer ambulance service serving Midwood is Flatbush Hatzoloh. The nearest hospitals are Maimonides Midwood Community Hospital (formerly New York Community Hospital) and Mount Sinai Brooklyn, both on Kings Highway. Both are certified "9-1-1 FDNY-EMS" receiving emergency facilities. One of Brooklyn's last remaining farms was located on the site of the apartment complex at 1279 East 17th St. (just north of Ave. M) until it was torn down in the mid-1960s.

== Parks ==
Parks include Kolbert Park and the Rachel Haber Cohen Playground and adjacent handball and basketball courts, near Edward R. Murrow High School, and the track and playing fields of Brooklyn College and Midwood High School.

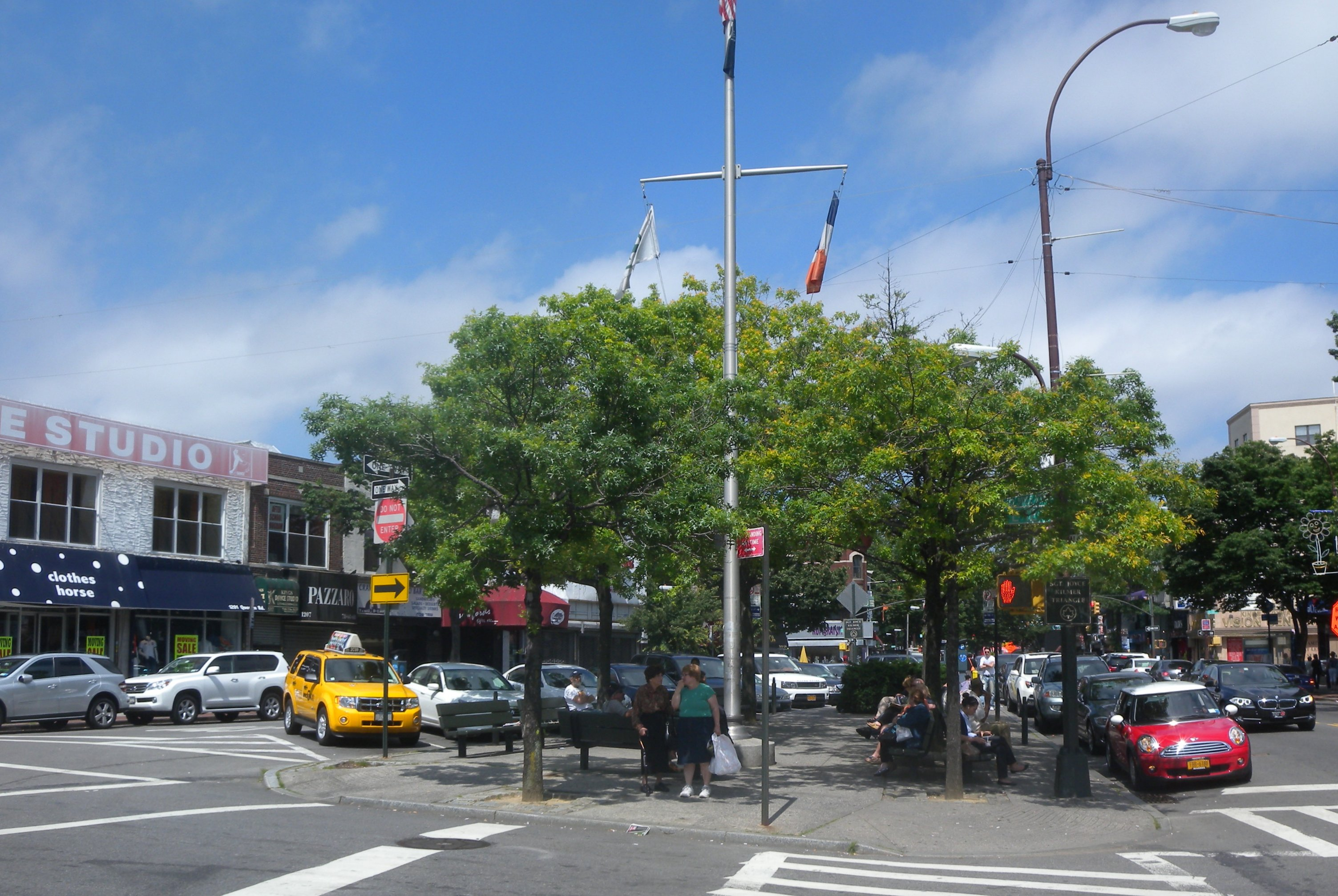
Sgt. Joyce Kilmer Triangle

Friends Field at East Second Street and Avenue L features baseball diamonds and tennis courts. Just opposite the field is the Erasmus Hall High School football field (closed to the public when not in use).

The sprawling square block-long Midwood High School Field (East 16th–17th Street at Avenues K-L) features handball courts, tennis courts, a runners track and a field used for football, rugby and soccer. On June 2, 1958, a Maccabiah event was held at the field, at which Olympic weightlifting champion Isaac Berger, U.S. racewalking champion Henry Laskau, and Olympic hammer throw competitor Marty Engel gave exhibitions. Students from adjacent Edward R. Murrow High School also use the field during school hours.

There are two public pedestrian plazas in Midwood:

- Corporal Wiltshire Square, named in Honor of Corporal Clifford T. Wiltshire, located at the intersection of Ocean Avenue where it merges with Avenue P and Kings Highway. 27-year-old Wiltshire, a married man residing at "1022 Avenue P, was killed by a direct hit by a shell in October 1918" while leading his comrades, after their sergeant was killed.
- Sgt. Joyce Kilmer Triangle, located at the crossroads of Kings Highway and Quentin Road (E. 12th–13th Streets), so named in honor of American journalist and poet Sgt. Joyce Kilmer (1866–1918). His is the smallest park in New York City, occupying 0.001 acres (0.00040 ha) of land.

== Police and crime ==
Midwood is patrolled by the 70th Precinct of the NYPD, located at 154 Lawrence Avenue. The 70th Precinct ranked 30th safest out of 69 patrol areas for per-capita crime in 2010. As of 2018, with a non-fatal assault rate of 42 per 100,000 people, Flatbush and Midwood's rate of violent crimes per capita was less than that of the city as a whole. The incarceration rate of 372 per 100,000 people was lower than that of the city as a whole.

The 70th Precinct has a lower crime rate than in the 1990s, with crimes across all categories having decreased by 89.1% between 1990 and 2018. The precinct reported 6 murders, 27 rapes, 162 robberies, 273 felony assaults, 173 burglaries, 527 grand larcenies, and 75 grand larcenies auto in 2018.

== Fire safety ==
The New York City Fire Department (FDNY)'s Engine Co. 276/Ladder Co. 156/Battalion 33, which serves Midwood, is located at 1635 East 14th Street.

== Health ==
As of 2018, preterm births are more common in Flatbush and Midwood than in other places citywide, though births to teenage mothers are less common. In Flatbush and Midwood, there were 99 preterm births per 1,000 live births (compared to 87 per 1,000 citywide), and 17.1 births to teenage mothers per 1,000 live births (compared to 19.3 per 1,000 citywide). Flatbush and Midwood has a relatively high population of residents who are uninsured, or who receive healthcare through Medicaid. In 2018, this population of uninsured residents was estimated to be 16%, which is higher than the citywide rate of 12%.

The concentration of fine particulate matter, the deadliest type of air pollutant, in Flatbush and Midwood is 0.0077 milligrams per cubic metre (7.7×10^{−9} oz/ft^{3}), lower than the citywide and boroughwide averages. Ten percent of Flatbush and Midwood residents are smokers, which is slightly lower than the city average of 14%. In Flatbush and Midwood, 28% of residents are obese, 13% are diabetic, and 31% have high blood pressure—compared to the citywide averages of 24%, 11%, and 28% respectively. 21% of children are obese, compared to the citywide average of 20%.

Eighty percent of residents eat some fruits and vegetables every day, which is lower than the city's average of 87%. In 2018, 77% of residents described their health as "good", "very good", or "excellent", slightly less than the city's average of 78%. For every supermarket in Flatbush and Midwood, there are 21 bodegas.

Hospitals in Midwood include Mount Sinai Brooklyn and New York Community Hospital. Additionally, SUNY Downstate Medical Center is located in nearby Flatbush.

== Post offices and ZIP Codes ==
Midwood is covered by two ZIP Codes: 11230 west of East 21st Street and 11210 east of East 21st Street. The United States Postal Service operates three post offices nearby:

- Kingsway Station – 1610 East 19th Street
- Midwood Station – 1288 Coney Island Avenue
- Vanderveer Station – 2319 Nostrand Avenue

== Religion ==
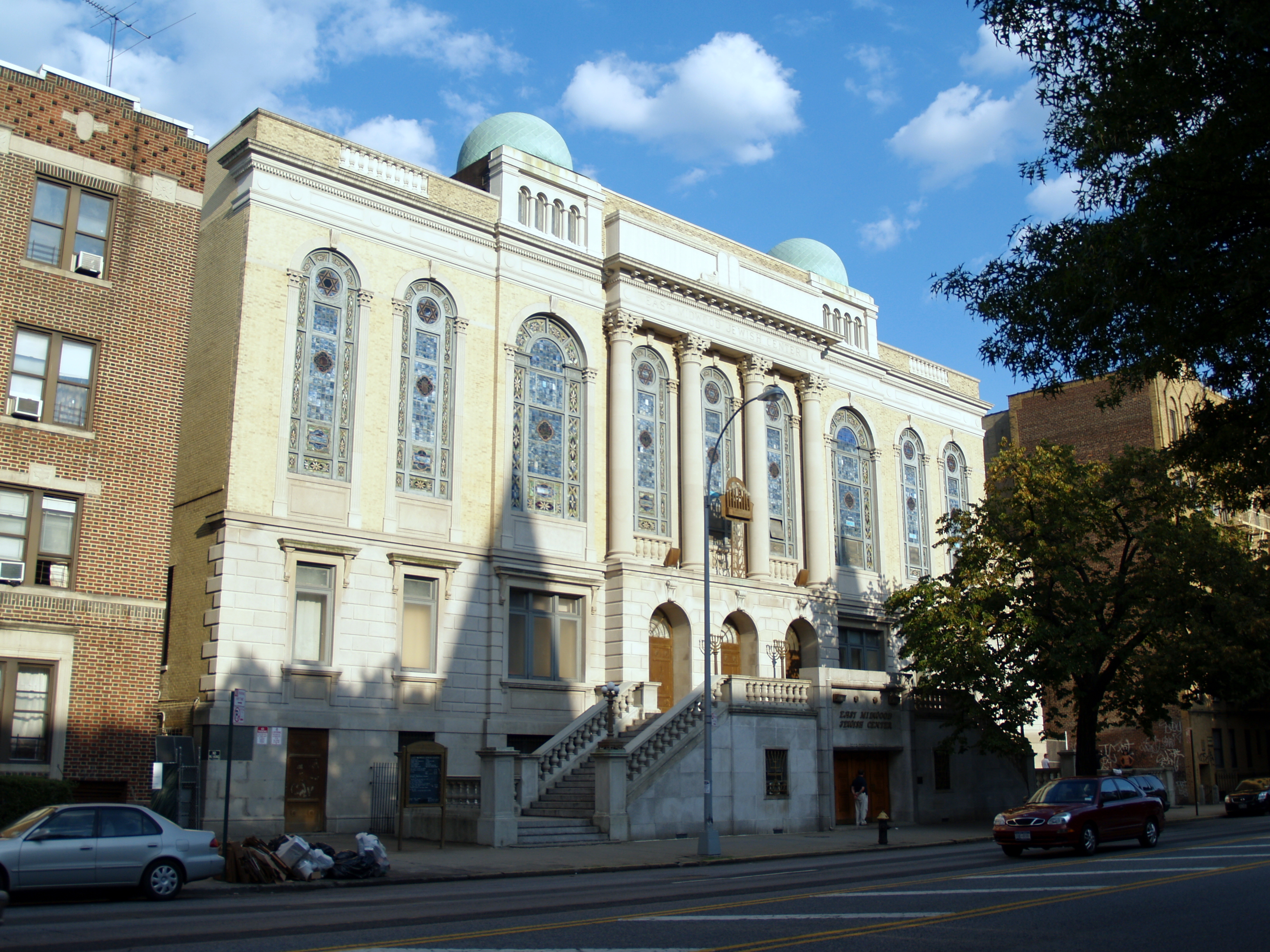
East Midwood Jewish Center

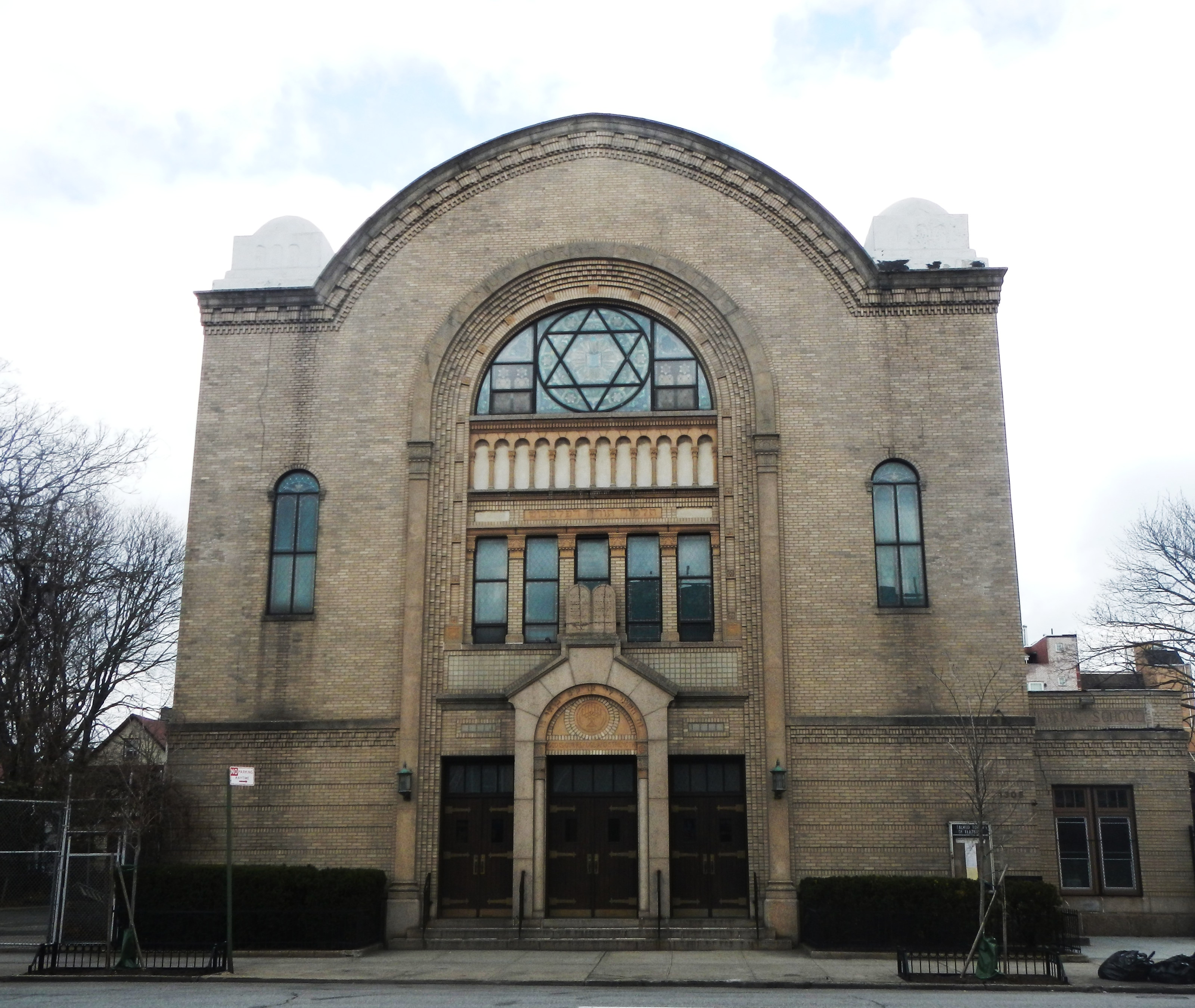
Talmud Torah of Flatbush

Midwood is a diverse multi-ethnic and multi-religious neighborhood; however, the neighborhood is predominantly Jewish.

=== Judaism ===
In the 1980s and 1990s, a wave of Orthodox Jews moved into the area from Borough Park, attracted by Midwood's large homes and tree-lined streets. Today, in addition to Ashkenazic Orthodox Jews, the area is home to a burgeoning Sephardic population. Along Kings Highway from Coney Island to McDonald Avenues are many Middle Eastern style restaurants and take-out food shops.

The East Midwood Jewish Center, a Conservative synagogue, was founded in 1924. The building, located on Ocean Avenue, is a 1929 Renaissance revival structure with a capacity of 950 in the main sanctuary. It was listed on the National Register of Historic Places in 2006. The Kingsway Jewish Center is an historic synagogue from the 1950s on Nostrand Avenue. It was listed on the National Register of Historic Places in 2010.

There are several branches of Touro College there, a college that was started in 1970. Midwood is also home to several large orthodox synagogues, including Congregation Beth Torah, the Young Israel of Midwood, Agudas Yisroel Bais Binyomin of Avenue L, Congregation Talmud Torah of Flatbush, Beis Medrash Ahavas Dovid Apsha under the leadership of Rabbi Shmuel Dovid Beck Shlita - The Apsha Rav, the minyan factory known as Landau's Shul (offering minyanim every 15 minutes on an average day), Rabbi Avraham Schorr's former synagogue, known as Khal Tiferes Yaakov on East 15th Street and Avenue L, the Bostoner Rebbe on Avenue J, Steinwurtzels, the Young Israel of Avenue J, the Agudah of Midwood, and several Syrian Orthodox synagogues. Synagogues based out of homes, called shtiebelach, are also common.

In November 2009, the Metropolitan Council on Jewish Poverty, a beneficiary agency of the UJA-Federation of New York, partnered with Masbia to open a kosher soup kitchen on Coney Island Avenue.

There are many yeshivos in Midwood. These include the Mirrer Yeshiva, Yeshiva Rabbeinu Chaim Berlin, Yeshiva Toras Emes Kaminetz, Mosdos Veretzky, Yeshiva of Brooklyn, Yeshiva Ohr Naftali, Yeshiva Tiferes Shmuel, Yeshivas Ohr Yisrael, Yeshivas Vyelipol, Yeshiva Ateret Torah, Yeshivat Mikdash Melech, and Yeshivas Beis Yosef Novardok.

=== Christianity ===
St. Brendan's Parish and Our Lady Help of Christians are two Roman Catholic Church congregations located in Midwood. The Church of the Three Hierarchs Greek Orthodox serves the Greek residents of the community. The Episcopal Church of the Epiphany also serves the community.

=== Islam ===
The area around Newkirk Avenue has one of the largest mosques in Brooklyn, the Muslim Community Center of Brooklyn, also known as Makki Masjid.

== Education ==
Flatbush and Midwood generally has a similar ratio of college-educated residents to the rest of the city as of 2018. Though 43% of residents age 25 and older have a college education or higher, 18% have less than a high school education and 39% are high school graduates or have some college education. By contrast, 40% of Brooklynites and 38% of city residents have a college education or higher. The percentage of Flatbush and Midwood students excelling in math rose from 43 percent in 2000 to 68 percent in 2011, though reading achievement remained steady at 48% during the same time period.

Flatbush and Midwood's rate of elementary school student absenteeism is about equal to the rest of New York City. In Flatbush and Midwood, 18% of elementary school students missed twenty or more days per school year, compared to the citywide average of 20% of students. Additionally, 75% of high school students in Flatbush and Midwood graduate on time, equal to the citywide average of 75% of students.

=== Schools and higher education ===
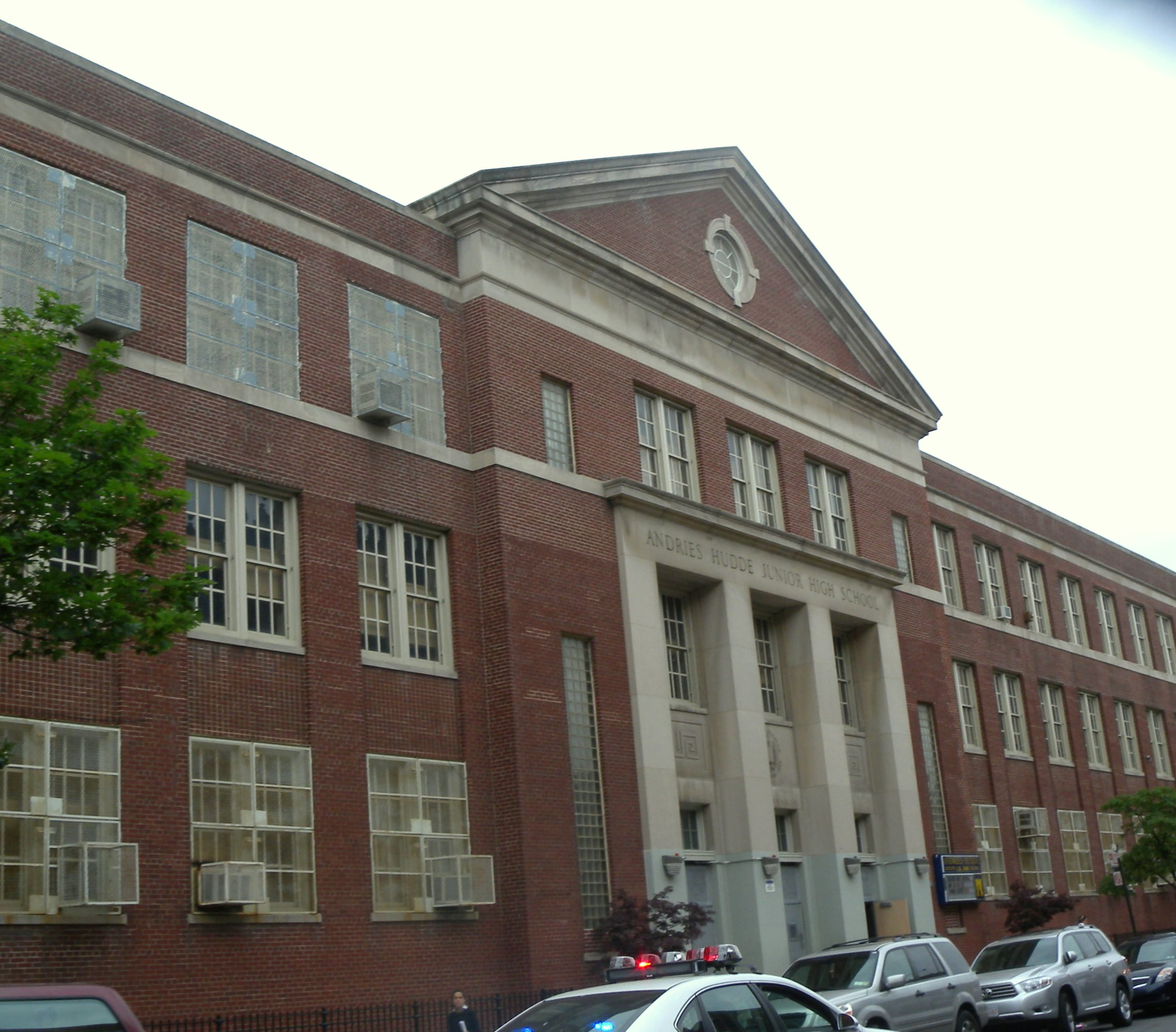
Hudde Junior High School, named after Andries Hudde

Midwood contains the following public schools operated by the New York City Department of Education:

- PS 193 Gil Hodges (grades PK-5)
- PS 197 The Kings Highway Academy (grades PK-5)
- PS 199 Frederick Wachtel (grades PK-5)
- Andries Hudde School (grades 6-8)
- IS 381 (grades 6-8)
- Edward R. Murrow High School (grades 9-12)
- Midwood High School (grades 9-12)

Private schools include:

- Prospect Park Yeshiva
- Yeshivah of Flatbush
- Masores Bais Yaakov
- Yeshiva Rabbi Chaim Berlin
- The Yeshiva of Brooklyn
- The Wallerstein Yeshiva
- Yeshiva Tiferes Yisroel, an affiliate of the Yeshivas Chofetz Chaim
- Masores Bais Yaakov for girls
- Yeshiva Torah Vodaas
- Ahavas Torah Yeshiva
- Yeshivas Bais Joseph Novardok Brooklyn (adult males)

Colleges include:

- Brooklyn College
- Touro College and University System

=== Libraries ===
The Brooklyn Public Library (BPL) has two branches in Midwood. The Midwood branch is located at 975 East 16th Street near Avenue J. It was founded in 1912 and relocated several times before moving to its current location. The branch was rebuilt in the 1950s and again in 1998, and a public plaza was built in 2013.

The Kings Highway branch is located at 2115 Ocean Avenue near Kings Highway. It was founded in 1910 and initially occupied several storefronts. When it moved to its current location in 1954, it became the first BPL branch library to be built by the New York City government. The library was renovated in 2009 and now contains a reading room in the basement and a passport office.

== Transportation ==
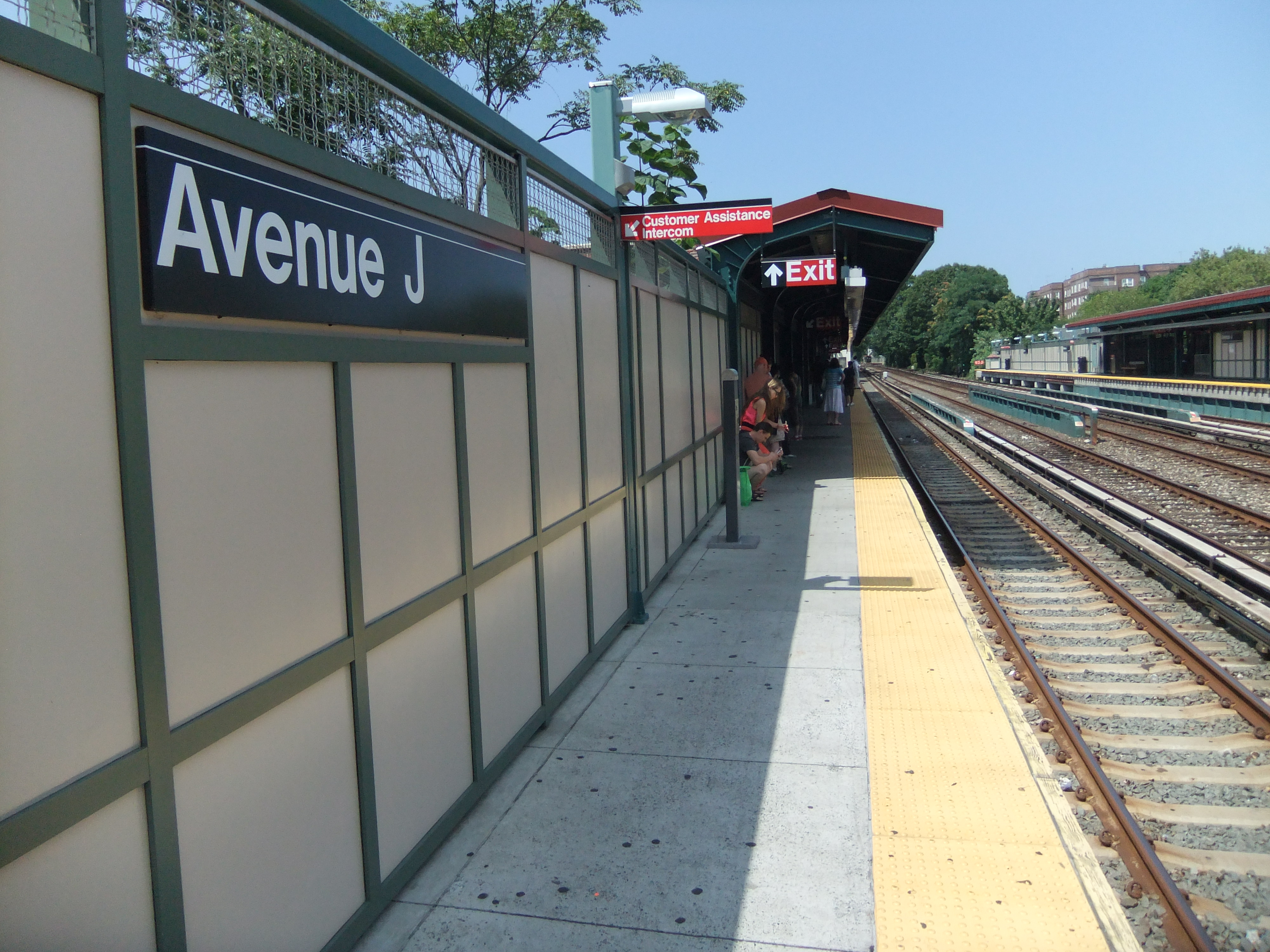
Avenue J on the BMT Brighton Line

The area is served by the New York City Subway's BMT Brighton Line (B and Q trains), IND Culver Line (F and <F> trains), and the IRT Nostrand Avenue Line (2 and 5 trains).

MTA New York City Transit routes serving the community include the Q35, B2, B6, B7, B9, B11, B31, B41, B44, B44 SBS, B49, B68, B82, B82 SBS, B100 and B103 local buses and the BM1, BM3 and BM4 express buses.

== In popular culture ==
=== Film ===
Midwood has long played a part in both film and television production. The film industry established itself in the neighborhood in 1907, when the Vitagraph company occupied studios at 1277 East 14th near Avenue M. Scenes from films like Hey Pop and Buzzin' Around, starring Fatty Arbuckle, were filmed on streets in Midwood. Warner Bros. purchased the studio in the 1920s, using it for short subjects, and moved the studio operation to Hollywood in 1939. A large smokestack bearing the name "Vitagraph" is still on the property, visible from the BMT Brighton Line. Many Vitagraph employees resided within the community.

The Brooklyn Historical Society and the Museum of the Moving Image (Astoria, New York) have collections on the Vitagraph Studios. An old vintage aerial photograph of the Vitagraph complex (and its streets) hangs today on a wall in the offices of the Midwood Development Corporation.

The Vitagraph Studios were later featured in a New York Times Article (2007), and in the PBS, WNET-13 TV Special 'A Walk Through Brooklyn,' hosted by David Hartman and historian Barry Lewis. Old historic photographs of the studio show that part of it also existed across the Brighton line subway tracks where Edward R. Murrow High School now stands.

After Warner Bros. vacated the land (in the late 1960s-early 1970s), Yeshiva University purchased it for Brooklyn Torah Academy, the Brooklyn branch of their high school. The Shulamith School purchased the property some years later, when it merged BTA into Manhattan Torah Academy. Until 2015 the building was home to the Shulamith Yeshiva School for Girls, which moved to Manhattan Beach. Present day, many within the community were unaware that the Shulamith School buildings and property were once a film studio. In 2018, the yeshiva was replaced with an eight-story, 302-unit apartment building.

The Leading Male men's attire store, once located at the corner of Kings Highway and East 12th Street, was the source for the disco attire that John Travolta and the other male cast members wore in the film Saturday Night Fever. A duplicate of the white suit Travolta wore in the film was at that time displayed in one of the showcase windows.

=== Television ===
==== NBC Studios ====
In 1952, NBC Television purchased part of the Vitagraph Studios, which then became known as NBC Brooklyn. Studio 1 along Locust Avenue. A new larger studio known as Color Studio 2 at 1268 East 14th Street, on the northwest corner of Avenue M. Many programs were taped here.

When it was dedicated in 1954, it was said to be the world's largest color TV production studio.

NBC sold the studio in 2000, and the facility became JC Studios. The facility was also used by CBS. In 2014, JC Studios closed, ending 60 years of TV history.

In 2015, OHEL Children's Home and Family Services created offices in the former Studio 1 on Locust Avenue, part of the original Vitagraph Studios. Studio 2, built by NBC, became a self-storage facility.

== Notable residents ==
Famous people who grew up in, formerly lived in, or attended or graduated from a school in Midwood include:

- Woody Allen, writer and director; attended P.S. 99, graduated from Midwood High School, and once resided at both 1402 Avenue K, and 968 East 14th Street
- Darren Aronofsky, director, attended Edward R. Murrow High School (though he grew up in Manhattan Beach)
- Letty Aronson (born Ellen Letty Konigsberg), film producer and sister of Woody Allen
- Noah Baumbach, writer, director and independent filmmaker
- Didi Conn, actress, graduated Midwood High School
- Lou Ferrigno, actor, bodybuilder, grew up and lived on East 5th Street in West Midwood
- Patrick Fitzgerald, former US Attorney for the Northern District of Illinois; partner at Skadden, Arps, Slate, Meagher & Flom
- Ruth Bader Ginsburg, Justice of the Supreme Court of the United States, attended East Midwood Jewish Center and James Madison High School
- Annie Golden, actress, lead singer of the late 1970s band The Shirts; grew up and lived in Midwood
- Elliot Goldenthal, contemporary classical music composer; attended I.S. 240-Andres Hudde Junior High School
- Yosef Goldman, author
- Gil Hodges, baseball player and manager; parishioner of Our Lady Help of Christians Church at E. 28 St. & Avenue M; Brooklyn namesakes include the Marine Parkway–Gil Hodges Memorial Bridge, Public School 193 in Midwood, a bowling alley in Mill Basin, and a portion of Bedford Avenue from Avenues L to N, near his home renamed Gil Hodges Way
- Lainie Kazan (born 1940), singer, actress (My Big Fat Greek Wedding)
- Ivan Leshinsky (born 1947), American-Israeli basketball player
- Barry Manilow, pop singer and songwriter
- Arthur Miller, playwright, Death of a Salesman
- Isaac Mizrahi (born 1961), fashion designer, TV presenter and chief designer of the Isaac Mizrahi brand
- Joel Moses, Israeli-American computer scientist and MIT professor, attended Midwood High School
- David Peel (1942–2017), underground rock musician
- Bernie Sanders, politician, 2016 presidential candidate, and U.S. senator from Vermont; grew up on East 26th Street and attended James Madison High School
- Jack Sarfatti, theoretical physicist
- Aaron Schechter (1928-2023), rosh yeshiva of Yeshiva Rabbi Chaim Berlin
- Chuck Schumer (born 1950), U.S. senator from New York
- Erich Segal, classics professor and novelist; graduated from Midwood High School
- Josh Silver, keyboardist and producer for the Gothic Metal band Type O Negative
- Tony Sirico, actor, "Paulie Walnuts" of HBO's The Sopranos; born in Midwood
- Meir Kahane, founder and leader of the Jewish Defense League lived in Midwood
- Peter Steele, lead singer, bassist, and composer for the Gothic Metal band Type O Negative; graduated from Murrow High School
- Ken Leung, actor, lived in Midwood as a child
- Chris Stein, of the pop band Blondie; attended P.S. 99 in the 1960s
- Tomys Swartwout, founding member of Midwout (Midwood); appointed a schepen (magistrate) to the Court of Midwout; a signer of the "Humble Remonstrance and Petition of the Colonies and Villages of this New Netherland Province" (December 11, 1653); one of the first campaigns for democratic rights in America
- Sy Syms (born Seymour Merinsky), philanthropist, founder and Chairman of the discount men's clothing retailer SYMS; graduated from Midwood High School
- Marisa Tomei, actress; graduated from Edward R. Murrow High School
- Michelle Trachtenberg, actress; attended P.S. 99
- Bruce Wasserstein, investment banker, businessman, and writer; born and raised in Midwood
- Adam Yauch, rapper and founding member of the Beastie Boys
- Boruch Rizel, a blogger for The Times of Israel

== Sources ==
- Midwood section of Congressman Anthony D. Weiner Archived December 11, 2004, at the Wayback Machine Consulted December 14, 2004
- Interview (with resident) Michael T. Wright- News 12 Networks 'News 12 Bklyn.' 'On The Road In Midwood' Live Broadcast Re: Midwood Celebrities, Vitagraph and NBC Bklyn. History Consulted August 16, 2007, and Sept.- Nov. 2007.
- Dulcie Leimbach (June 29, 2003). "If You're Thinking of Living In/Midwood; Bustling Area With a Touch of Country". New York Times. Archived from the original on December 29, 2007.
- Vivian S. Toy (December 4, 2009). "LIVING IN: MIDWOOD, BROOKLYN; Where Prosperity Breeds Proximity". New York Times. Archived from the original on March 4, 2015.
