= Shalom haLevi Rozenfeld =

Eastern European Rabbi

Rabbi Shalom Rozenfeld
- שלום הלוי ראָזענפֿעלד

Personal life
- Born: 1800
- Died: November 1851 (aged 50–51)

Religious life
- Religion: Judaism

Jewish leader
- Yahrtzeit: 20 Cheshvan, 5612

Shalom haLevi Rozenfeld, known as Rabbi Shalom of Kaminka (1800–1851), was a Galician scholar in Hasidic Judaism known as a zaddik and kabbalist. His sayings or lessons often appear in collected works of Hasidic stories or tales. He was the rabbi and Av Beit Din in Novyi Yarychiv and in Kamianka-Buzka; both were located in the Austro-Hungarian province of Galicia not far from Lviv.

== Life ==
Rozenfeld was born in 1800.

As a young man, he was a student in Torah of Rabbi Shlomo Kluger and in Kabbalah and Hasidism he was a disciple of Rabbi Naftali of Ropshitz. After the latter’s death in 1827, he became a disciple in Kabbalah and Hasidism of Rabbi Sholom Rokeach of Belz. Additionally, he was a disciple in Kabbalah and Hasidism of Rabbi Tzvi Hirsh of Zidichov. He was a close friend of Rabbi Chaim Halberstam of Sanz.

He wrote many chidushim on the Torah but preferred that they not be printed.

He died in his early fifties in 1851. Because this was a relatively young age for religious scholars in that time, he never served as a rebbe, although his contemporaries held him in great esteem.

His only son, Joshua (1830–1897), succeeded him as Rabbi of Kamianka-Buzka after his death. Rabbi Joshua was very stringent in his observances.
