= Komarno (Hasidic dynasty) =

Ukrainian Hasidic dynasty

Komarno Hasidic Dynasty
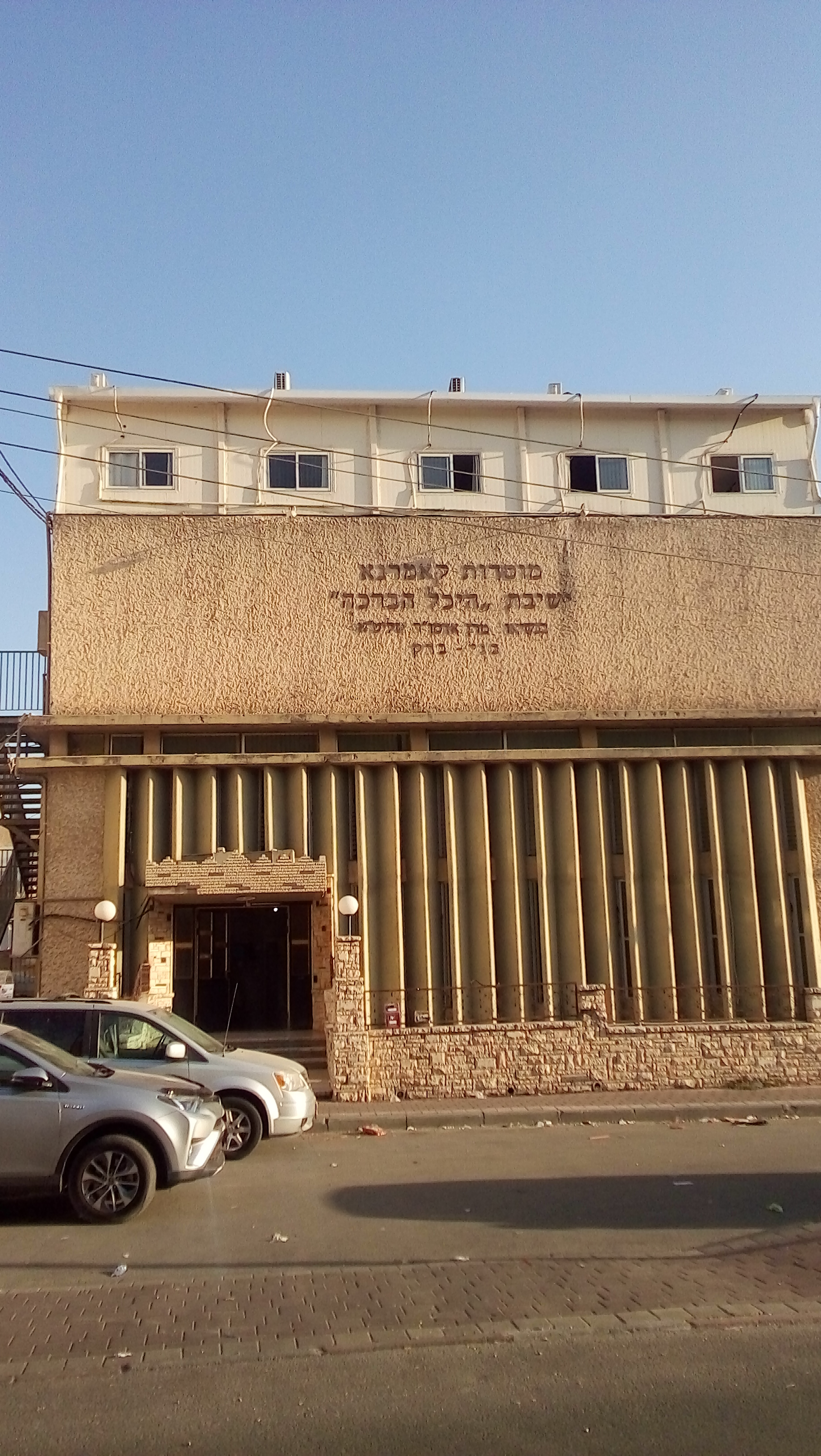
- Komarno synagogue in Bnei Brak

Founder
- Rabbi Aleksander Sender Safrin

Regions with significant populations
- Israel, United States, United Kingdom

Religions
- Hasidic Judaism

Komarno is a dynasty of Hasidic Judaism founded by Rabbi Aleksander Sender Safrin (born 1770; died 28 August 1818 in Sátoraljaújhely, Hungary) of Komarno, Ukraine.

== Dynasty ==
=== Rabbi Aleksander Sender Eichenstein ===
Sender was the son of Rabbi Yitzchak Eisik Eichenstein (born 1740; died 26 February 1800) of the town of Safrin, from where Sender's family name originates. He was a disciple of Yaakov Yitzchak of Lublin and died at the age of 47.

=== Rabbi Yitzchak Eisik Safrin ===
After Sender's death, his son, Rabbi Yitzchak Eisik Yehuda Yechiel Safrin (born 13 February 1806; died 28 April 1874), was raised by his uncle (his father's brother), Rabbi Tzvi Hirsh Eichenstein (born 1763; died 22 June 1831) of Zidichov.

- Eisik Safran was succeeded as rebbe by his son, Rabbi Eliezer Tzvi Safrin of Komarno (born 1830; died 16 May 1898). Another son of Eisik was Rabbi Alexander Sender Safrin.
  - Eliezer Tzvi was succeeded as rebbe by his son, Rabbi Yaakov Moshe Safrin of Komarno (born 13 June 1861; died 23 July 1929). His son-in-law was Rabbi Chaim Elazar Spira of Munkacs (born 17 December 1871; died 11 May 1937).
    - Yaakov Moshe was succeeded as rebbe by his son, Rabbi Sholom Safrin of Komarno (died May 1937), a son-in-law of Rabbi Yisrael Perlow of Stolin (born 24 November 1868; died 4 October 1921 in Frankfurt, Germany).
      - Sholom was succeeded as rebbe by his son, Rabbi Baruch Safrin (born 1913, died 1943). He was the last rebbe to reside in Komarno. He was murdered in the Holocaust.
      - Another son of Rabbi Eliezer Zvi was Rabbi Avraham Mordechai Safrin of Borislav, who was succeeded by his son, Rabbi Chaim Yankev Safrin, who emigrated to the United States before World War II and was succeeded by his son,
        - Rabbi Sholom Safrin, Komarno rebbe in Jerusalem, who was succeeded by his sons,
          - Rabbi Nesanel Safrin, Komarno rebbe in Jerusalem and
          - Rabbi Eliezer Tzvi Safrin, Komarno rebbe in Beit Shemesh. He is the author of the "Ohr Shivat HaYamim" commentary on the writings of the Baal Shem Tov.
        - Rabbi Menachem Monish, Komarno rebbe in Bnei Brak, who was succeeded by his sons,
          - Rabbi Zvi El'azar, Komarno rebbe in Bnei Brak, and
          - Rabbi Yitzhak Shlomo, Komarno rebbe in Jerusalem.
        - Rabbi Alter Yitzchok Elimelech Safrin, Komarno rebbe in the United States (died June 2016),
        - Rabbi Yissachar Dov Ber (died November 2006), also in Bnei Brak, and
        - Rabbi Yehoshua Safrin in the United States (died August 2026).
