= Joseph Babad =

Polish rabbi

Joseph ben Moses Babad (1801 – 1874) was a rabbi, posek and Talmudist, best known for his work, the Minchat Chinuch, a commentary on the Sefer Hachinuch.

== Biography ==
Babad was born in 1801 in Przeworsk. He studied under Chaim Halberstam, the Sanzer Rov. He served as rabbi at Bohorodczany, Zbarizh, Sniatyn, and Tarnopil where in 1857 he was appointed as Av Beit Din, a position he held for the rest of his life. He enjoyed close relationships with the various Hasidic leaders of Galicia. Rabbi Babad's first wife is not known; he later married the sister of Chaim Halberstam, and after her death he again remarried. He died in 1874 in Ternopil.

== Works ==
The Minchat Chinuch (Hebrew: מנחת חינוך “Offering of Education”, a play-on-words referencing the sacrifice of the same name) is a legal commentary on the Sefer ha-Chinuch. The Sefer Ha-Chinuch systematically discusses the 613 commandments of the Torah, their Biblical source, and philosophical underpinnings - while the Minchat Chinuch serves as a legal commentary through the perspective of the Talmud and Rishonim. It is widely studied in Yeshivas and in private study groups, and remains popular to this day

Minchat Chinuch focuses on conceptual analysis, and does not present practical conclusions. It is noted for its technique of isolating legal concepts through the use of uncommon test cases, such as whether a hermaphrodite is obligated in the mitzvah of "be fruitful and multiply." This feature of the book makes it a useful starting point in conceptual analysis of talmudic topics. Many subsequent commentaries were then written on the Minchat Chinuch.

Other works by Rabbi Babad include:

- Mishpat Shalom on Choshen Mishpat
- Glosses on Maimonides' Mishne Torah
- Chiddushim (novellae) on the Rif on Tractate Brachot.
