= Sholom Rokeach =

First Belzer Rebbe (leader of a Hasidic group)

- Title: First Belzer Rebbe

Personal life
- Born: Sholom Rokeach; 1779 Brody, Austrian Galicia, part of the Habsburg Empire
- Died: September 10, 1855 (aged 75–76) Belz, Austrian Galicia, part of the Austrian Empire
- Spouse: Malka
- Children: Elazar; Yehoshua; 3 other sons 2 daughters
- Parents: Eleazar Rokeach (father); Rivka Henna Ramraz (mother)
- Dynasty: Belz

Religious life
- Religion: Judaism

Jewish leader
- Successor: Yehoshua Rokeach
- Yahrtzeit: 27 Elul 5615 A.M.
- Dynasty: Belz

Sholom Rokeach (1781 – September 10, 1855), also known as the Sar Sholom (Hebrew: שר שלום, "Angel of Peace"), was the first rebbe (hereditary hasidic leader) of the Belz dynasty.

Belzer Hasidim call him "Der Ershter Rov" (the first rabbi); in the city of Belz itself he was called "Der Alter Rov" (the old rabbi) in deference to Yoel Sirkis, who presided as rabbi of Belz in the sixteenth century.

== Biography ==
His mother was Rivka Henna Ramraz and his father was Rabbi Eleazar Rokeach, of Brody, who was the grandson of Rabbi Elazar Rokeach of Amsterdam, author of Maaseh Rokeach, who was the rabbi of Brody until 1736, and later, Chief Rabbi of Amsterdam.

After his father died at the age of 32, his mother lived in Brody with her five children. She sent Sholom, around 11 years old at the time, to be raised by her brother, Rabbi Yissachar Dov Ramraz, rabbi of Skohl, then in Galicia. Later on, he married Rabbi Yissachar Dov's daughter, Malka. They had five sons and two daughters. According to Czech writer Jiří Langer, who moved to Belz in 1913 and began collecting anecdotes about Rokeach a half-century after his death, he was so devoted to his "excellent wife" that "contrary to the custom of all devout men he even ate at the same table with her."

In Skohl, Rokeach was influenced by Rabbi Shlomo Flam, also known as the Rebbe of Skohl, who was the private scribe and right-hand man of Rabbi Dov Ber of Mezeritch, the successor to the Baal Shem Tov, founder of Hasidism. Since Rokeach’s uncle (and father-in-law) was opposed to Hasidism, Rokeach would secretly leave the house at night to meet a former business partner for hasidic study sessions.

Rokeach was also a disciple of the Seer of Lublin.

He composed several songs, most of them still sung by the Belzer Hasidim, including one niggun (melody) to Tzur Mishelo sung during the Shalosh Seudot (third Shabbat meal).

An anthology of his writings is entitled Midbar Kodesh.

He reigned as Rebbe from 1817 (when he became a Rabbi in Belz) until he died in 1855.

He built a four-story synagogue with a capacity of 5,000 in Belz, which was inaugurated in 1843.

Rabbi Shalom became famous for the miracles he performed. Many patients were supernaturally healed by him when Rabbi Shalom placed his hand on the site of the disease or put one of his objects on the site, and thus the disease was miraculously cured. Fifty-five years after Rabbi Shalom's death, Rabbi Avraham Haim Michaelzon published the book "Dover Shalom," which compiled Torah teachings of Rabbi Shalom and testimonies from his family, acquaintances, and those who witnessed his miracles.

Although it was uncommon in the early Hasidic movement for a son to succeed his father as rebbe (typically the rebbe or leader would be succeeded by a disciple), Rokeach wished to be succeeded by the youngest of his five sons, Yehoshua.

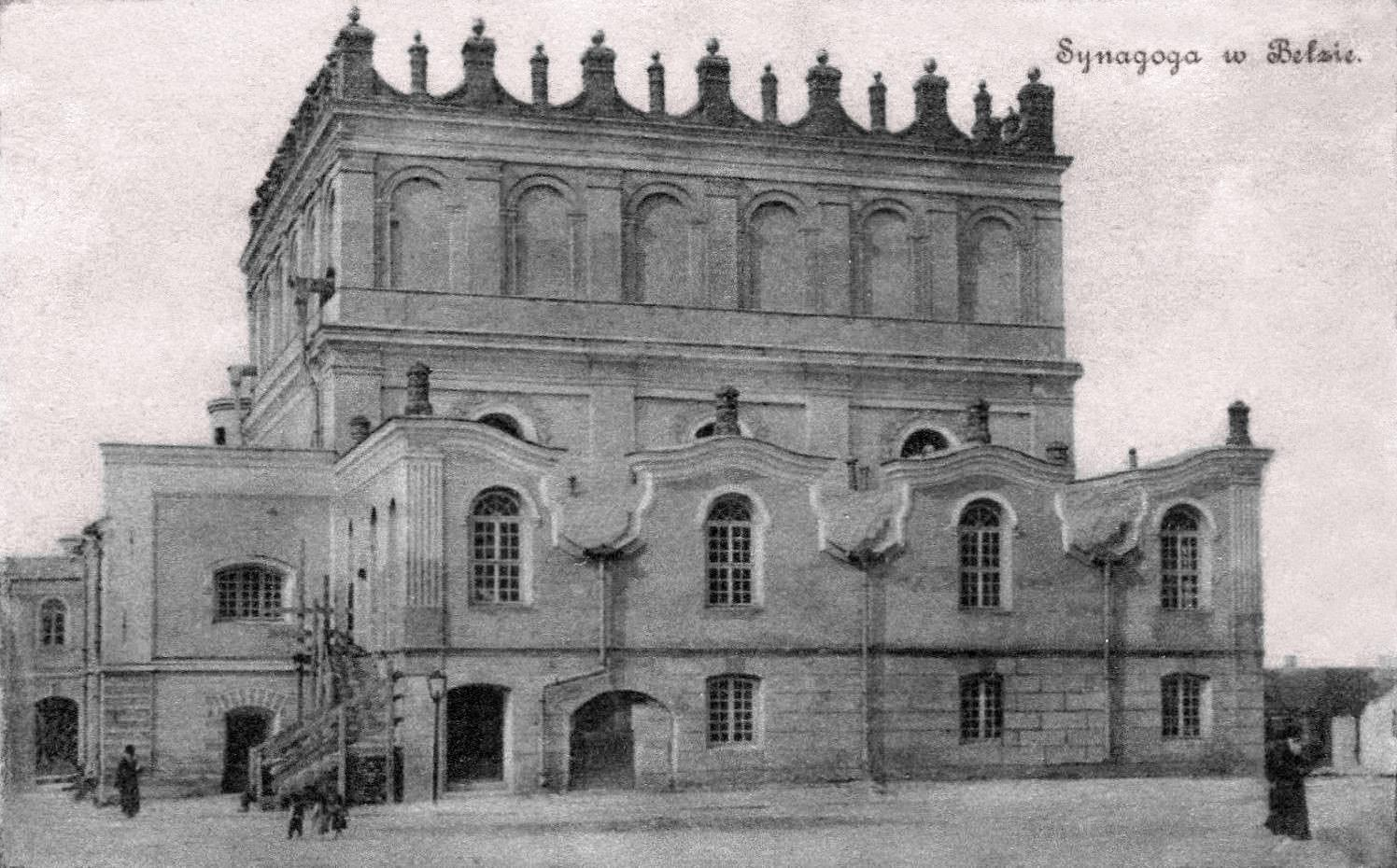
Great Synagogue of Belz

== Successors ==
1. Yehoshua Rokeach (1825–1894)
2. Yissachar Dov Rokeach (1854–1926)
3. Aharon Rokeach (1877–1957)
4. Yissachar Dov Rokeach (b. 1948)

== Disciples ==
His notable disciples include Rabbis Shlomo Kluger, Chaim Halberstam, Zadok HaKohen, Shalom of Kaminka , and Yehoshua of Lezsno (Lechno).

== See also ==
- Belz Great Synagogue
