= Sambur (Hasidic dynasty) =

Ukrainian Hasidic dynasty

Sambur, or Sambor, is the name of two distinct Hasidic dynasties: one founded by Rebbe Moshe Eichenstein of Sambir, Ukraine (died 1840), a brother of Rabbi Tzvi Hirsh of Zidichov. The other was founded by Rabbi Uri Jolles, of the same town (died 1910). The Sambor dynasty continues in the Bronx and Buenos Aires.
