= Nyzhni Vorota =

Nyzhni Vorota Нижні Ворота
- Village
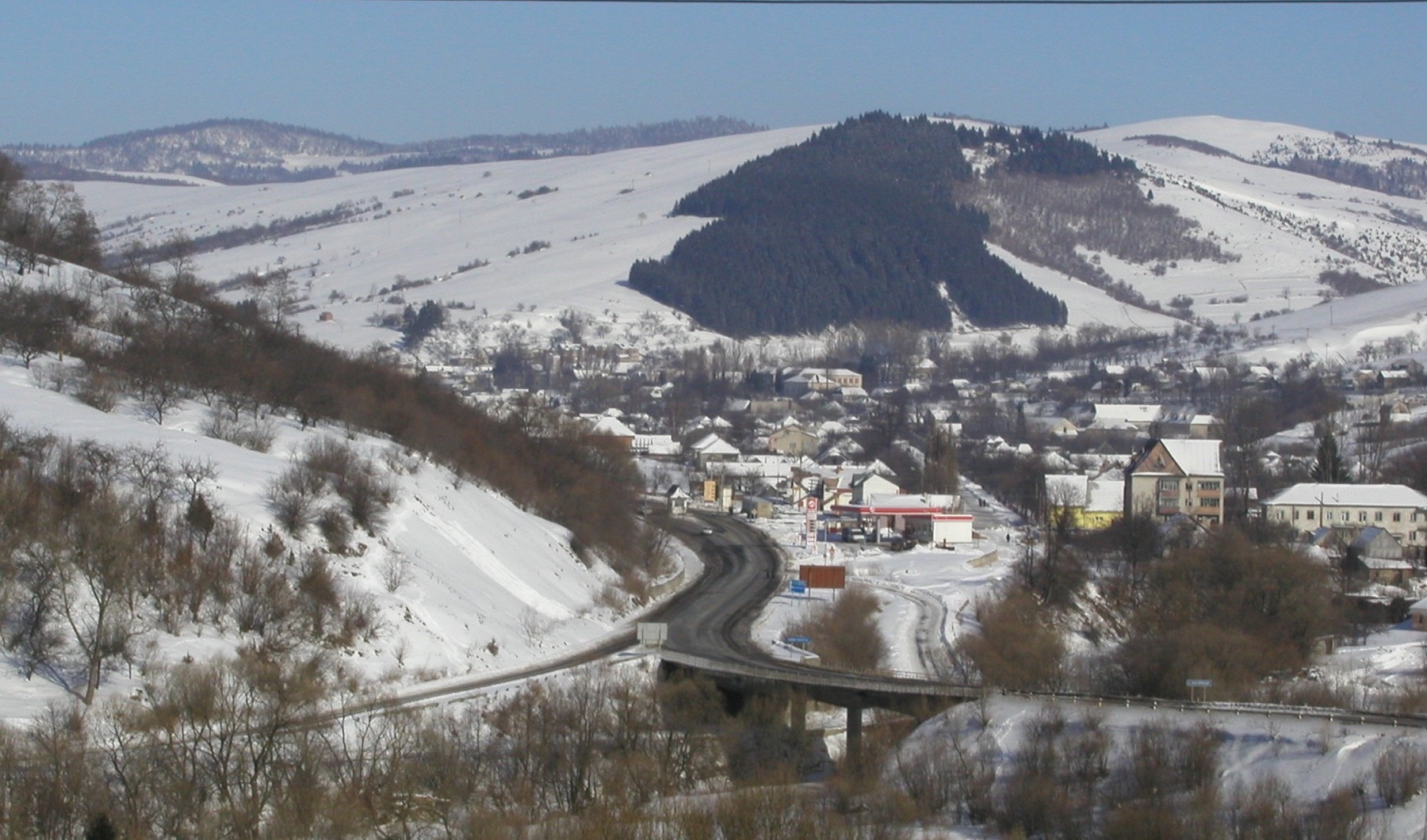
- Nyzhni Vorota in 2003.

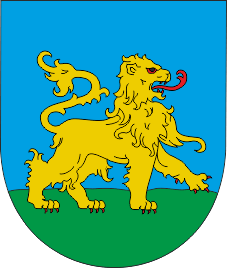
- Coat of arms

- Location within Ukraine Location within Zakarpattia Oblast
- Coordinates: 48°46′17″N 23°05′54″E
- Country: Ukraine
- Oblast: Zakarpattia Oblast
- District: Volovets Raion
- Established: 12th century

Area
  - Total: 29 km^{2} (11 sq mi)
- Elevation /(average value of): 448 m (1,470 ft)

Population
  - Total: 2,504
  - Density: 86/km^{2} (220/sq mi)
- Time zone: UTC+2 (EET)
  - Summer (DST): UTC+3 (EEST)
- Postal code: 89130
- Area code: +380 03136
- Website: місто Нижні Ворота, райцентр Воловець ^{(Ukrainian)}

Nyzhni Vorota (Ukrainian: Ни́жні Воро́та; Yiddish: ווערעצקי, romanized: Veretzky; Hungarian: Alsóverecke, Volóci járás, by 1945 the village had the name Ukrainian: Ни́жні Вере́цьки) is a village in Volovets Raion, Zakarpattia Oblast of Western Ukraine.
The village has around 2,240 inhabitants. Local government is administered by Nyzhnovoritska village council, based in the village.

== Geography ==
The village Nyzhni Vorota is located in the Carpathian Mountains, on the southern slopes of the Dividing Range, within Volovets Pass.
Through the village passes the Highway M06 (Ukraine) ( M 06). It is a Ukrainian international highway (M-highway) connecting Kyiv to the Hungarian border near Chop, where it connects to the Hungarian Highway M34.
Distance from the regional center Uzhhorod is 97 kilometres (60 mi) , 15 kilometres (9.3 mi) from the district center Volovets, and 171 kilometres (106 mi) from Lviv.

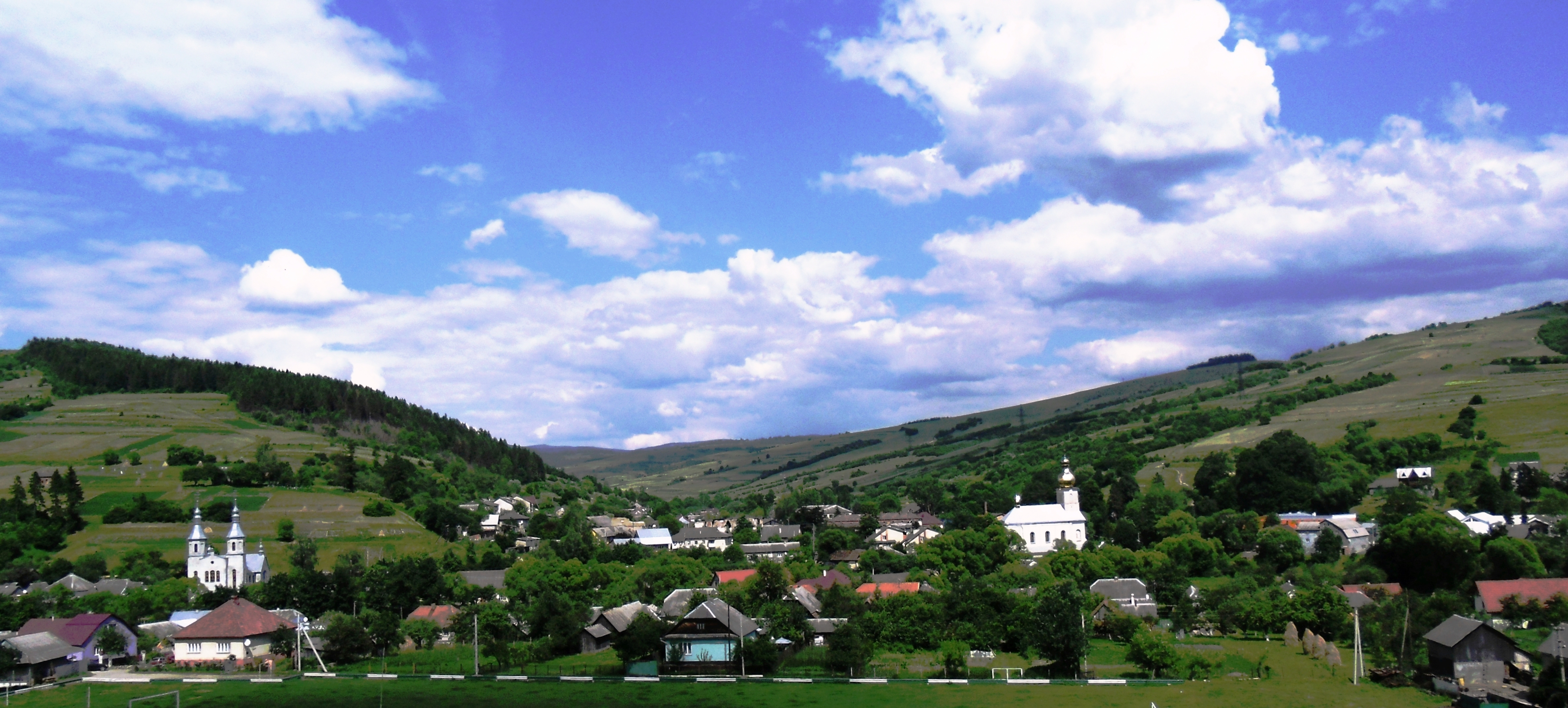
Nyzhni Vorota in 2014

== History ==
By 1880, the Jewish population was 545 (of a total population of 1,276). With the Hungarian occupation in March, 1939, Jews were persecuted and pushed out of their occupations. In 1941, dozens of Jews from Nyzhni Vorota were drafted into forced labor battalions and others were drafted for service on the Eastern front, where most died. In August, 1941, a number of Jewish families (totaling 80 persons) without Hungarian citizenship were expelled to Nazi occupied Ukrainian territory, to Kamenets-Podolski, and murdered there. The remaining Jews, about 500, were deported to Auschwitz mid-May 1944.

== See also ==
- Veretzky (Rabbinical dynasty)
