= Yitzchak Isaac of Zidichov =

Yitzchak Isaac of Zidichov (1805–June 4, 1873) was a noted Hasidic rabbi. He was the son of Rabbi Yisachar Barish, who was the brother of Rabbi Tzvi Hirsh of Zidichov (1763–1831). Rabbi Yitzchak Isaac was a close disciple of Rabbi Tzvi Hirsh of Zidichov until the latter's death. He later studied under Rabbi Shalom of Belz. He was the author of Likutei Maharya.
