= Tzvi Hirsh of Zidichov =

Hasidic rabbi (1763–1831)

- Title: Rabbi Tzvi Hirsh of Zidichov

Personal life
- Born: Tzvi Hirsh Eichenstein; 1763 Sambor
- Died: June 22, 1831 (aged 67–68) Zidichov
- Parents: Rabbi Yitzchak Isaac Eichenstein of Safrin (father); Hinde (mother)
- Dynasty: Zidichov

Religious life
- Religion: Judaism

Jewish leader
- Main work: Ateret Tzvi
- Dynasty: Zidichov

Tzvi Hirsh Eichenstein also known as Hirsh Zydaczower (1763, Sambor – June 22, 1831, Żydaczów), was a famous Hasidic Rebbe, a noted Talmudist, Kabbalist and author of novellae on Torah and responsa. He founded the Zidichov Hasidic dynasty.

He was a disciple of rabbis Moshe Leib of Sassov, Menachem Mendel of Rimanov, the Maggid of Koznitz and the Seer of Lublin.

His younger brother was Rabbi Moshe of Sambor.

Among Rabbi Tzvi Hirsh's students were his nephew Rabbi Yitzchak Isaac of Komarna, Rabbi Tzvi Elimelech of Dinov (the Bnei Yisaschar), his nephew Rabbi Yitzchak Isaac of Zidichov, Rabbi Shimon of Yaruslav, and Rabbi Shalom of Kaminka.

Rabbi Tzvi Hirsh was very passionate about studying Kabbalah, Zohar, and the Kitvei Ari ("writings of Rabbi Isaac Luria") in particular. He made a tremendous effort in encouraging Jews to study these works. With the assistance of his students, some yeshivot in Galicia added the study of Kabbalah to their curriculum. Rabbi Tzvi Hirsh blended the teachings of the Baal Shem Tov with the kabbalah of the Ari.

His book Ateret Tzvi includes his commentary on the Zohar. In his book Sur Mei'ra Ve'asei Tov (lit., "refrain from evil and do good"), he shows the path to spiritual growth with the assistance of Zohar study and the Kitvei Ari.

Rabbi Yitzchak Isaac of Komarna writes in one of his books that the soul of his teacher Rabbi Tzvi Hirsh is "from the root of the soul of Rabbi Chaim Vital, which is close to the soul of Rabbi Akiva". Once Rabbi Tzvi Hirsh told his brother Rabbi Moshe of Sambor that in one of his "previous lives" he was Rabbi Yishmael Kohen Gadol (one of a series of high priests of the Second Temple, famous for his mystical visions recorded both in the Talmud and in the corpus known as Sifrei Heichalot - literature of the heavenly palaces). The righteous Jews of his generation said he had the soul of the famous Yenukah, mentioned in the Zohar portion of Balak. Another one of his students, Rabbi Yitzchak Isaac of Zidichov, said, "I heard from the holy mouth of my teacher that he was one of the students of Rabbi Shimon bar Yochai".

His day of departure of this world (yortzeit/hilula) is the 11th of Tamuz (This day is considered by some Hasidim in Eastern Europe to be similar to Lag Ba'omer).

== Links ==
Daily Zohar - Biography

Rebbe Tzvi Hirsch of Ziditchov: Taking a Costume Seriously

Teaching of Rabbi Tzvi Hirsch - "Kuntres Meirat Einayim, Section 57"

Explanation of a Gemara (Succah 53a)

Location of his Kever (holy sepulture)

Article about Rabbi Tzvi Hisrch: "He Is Well-Connected"

== Name ==
The name Tzvi Hirsh is a bilingual tautological name in Yiddish. It means literally "deer-deer" and is traceable back to the Hebrew word צבי tsvi "deer" and the German word Hirsch "deer".
