= Yissachar Dov Rokeach =

Yissachar Dov Rokeach could refer to:

- Yissachar Dov Rokeach (third Belzer rebbe) (1854–1926), the third Rebbe of the Belz Hasidic dynasty
- Yissachar Dov Rokeach (fifth Belzer rebbe) (born 1948), the fifth and current Rebbe of the Belz Hasidic dynasty
