= Aharon Mordechai Rokeach =

Israeli rabbi

- אהרן מרדכי רוקח
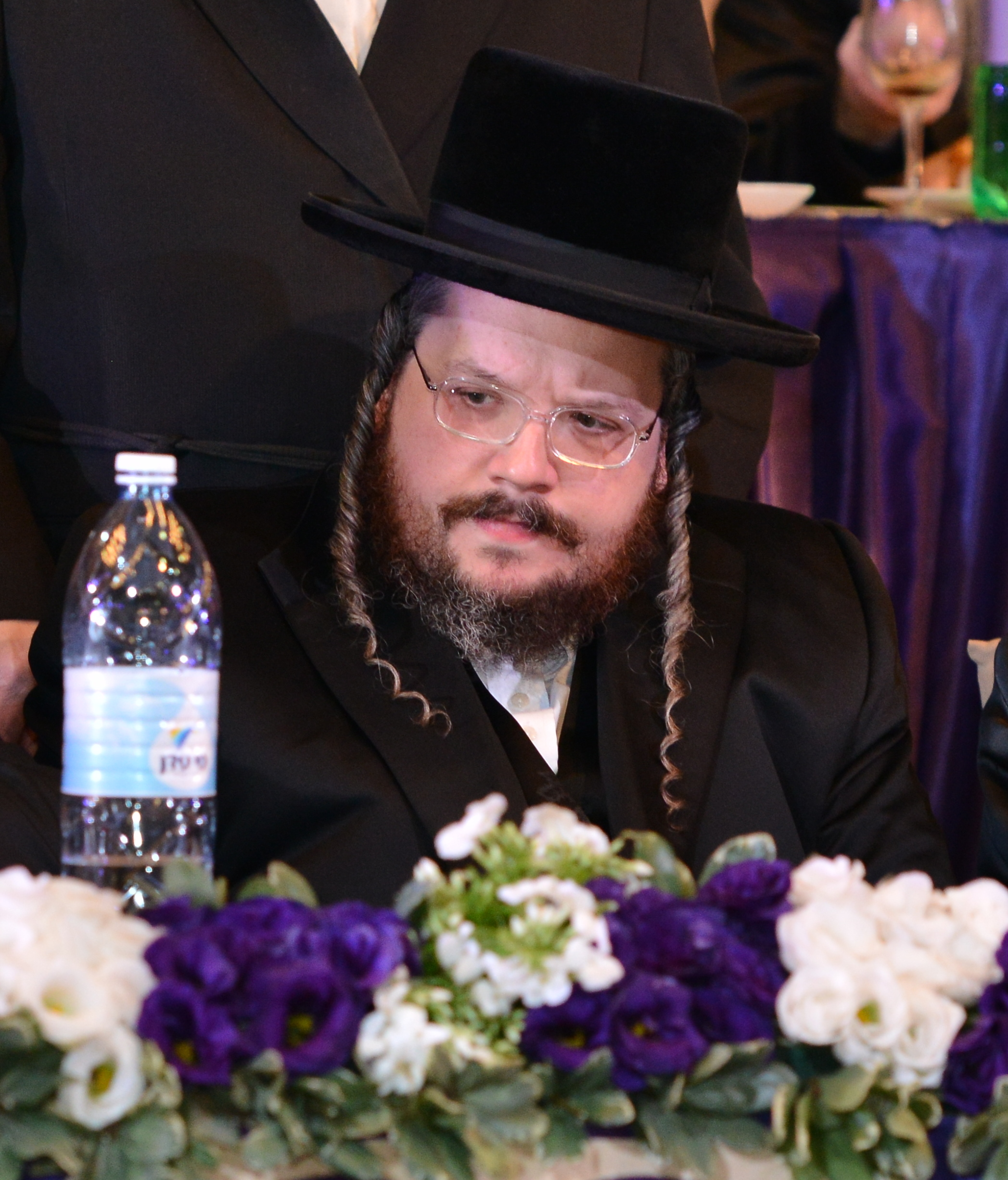

Personal life
- Born: Aharon Mordechai Rokeach; 12 October 1975 (age 51) Jerusalem, Israel
- Spouse: Sarah Leah Lemberger
- Children: 10 sons 3 daughters
- Parents: Yissachar Dov Rokeach (father); Sarah Hager (mother)

Religious life
- Religion: Judaism

Aharon Mordechai Rokeach (Hebrew: אהרן מרדכי רוקח; born 12 October 1975 [7 Cheshvan 5736]) is the only child — and heir — of the current Rebbe of Belz, Rabbi Yissachar Dov Rokeach. Born in Jerusalem, Israel, he was named after his father's uncle, Rabbi Aharon Rokeach, the fourth Belzer Rebbe, and his father's father, Rabbi Mordechai of Bilgoray.

== Family background ==
Aharon Mordechai was born to Yissachar Dov Rokeach and Sarah Hager, daughter of Rabbi Moshe Yehoshua Hager, the future Vizhnitzer rebbe, after 10 years of marriage.

== Biography ==
The occasion of his bar mitzvah on 18 October 1988 (7 Cheshvan 5749) prompted a mass gathering of Hasidim in the half-finished Belz Great Synagogue in Jerusalem, followed by a Belzer convention that filled the Jerusalem Convention Center.

On July 7, 1992, Aharon Mordechai was engaged to Sarah Leah Lemberger, daughter of Rabbi Shimon Lemberger, Makova Rebbe in Kiryat Ata. They were married on August 3, 1993, in Kiryat Belz, Jerusalem, in the presence of 60,000 people. The couple has ten sons and three daughters.
