= Yissachar Dov Rokeach (fifth Belzer rebbe) =

Orthodox Jewish Grand Rabbi

Yissachar Dov Rokeach יששכר דב רוקח
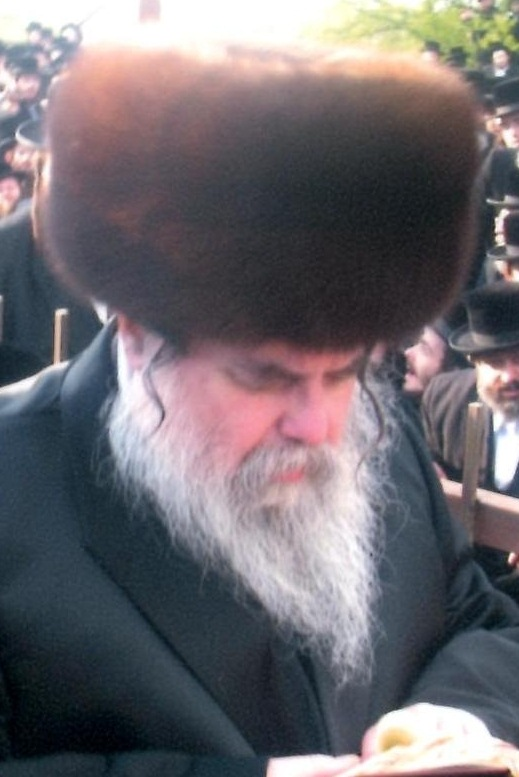
- Rabbi Yissachar Dov Rokeach of Belz
- Title: Fifth Belzer Rebbe

Personal life
- Born: Yissachar Dov Rokeach; January 18, 1948 (age 78) Tel Aviv
- Spouse: Sarah Hager
- Children: Aharon Mordechai Rokeach
- Parents: Mordechai of Bilgoray (father); Miriam Glick (mother)

Religious life
- Religion: Judaism

Jewish leader
- Predecessor: Aharon Rokeach
- Began: 1966
- Ended: present

Yissachar Dov Rokeach (born 19 January 1948) is the fifth, and present, Rebbe of the Hasidic dynasty of Belz. He is the son of Rabbi Mordechai of Bilgoray (1902 – 1949), the grandson of the third Belzer Rebbe, Rabbi Yissachar Dov Rokeach, and the nephew of the fourth Belzer Rebbe, Rabbi Aharon Rokeach, who raised him. He has led Belz since 1966.

== Family background ==
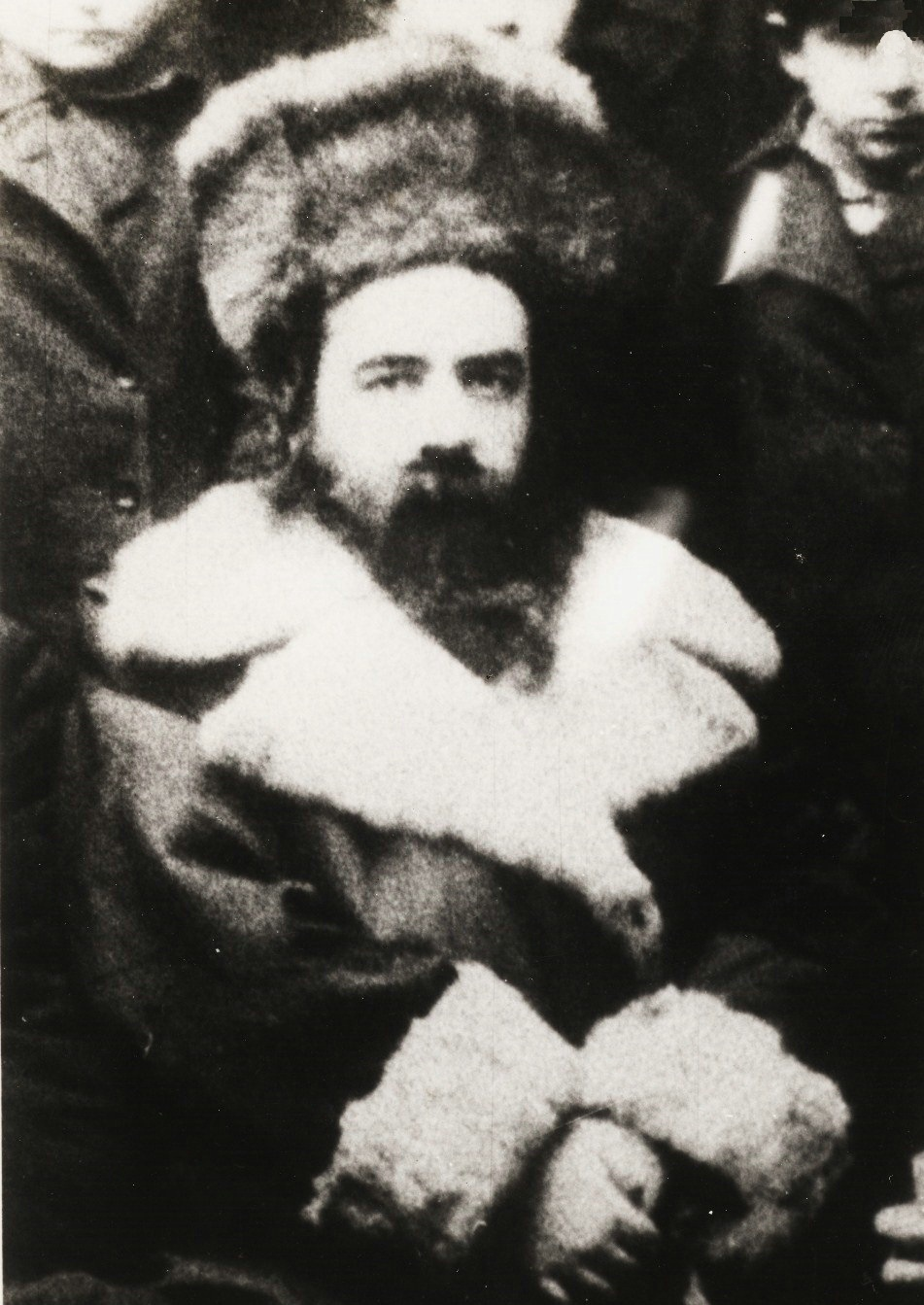
Rabbi Mordechai of Bilgoray

Rabbi Mordechai of Bilgoray and his half-brother (through his father), Rebbe Aharon, escaped Europe in a daring escape attempt and arrived in the Land of Israel in 1944. Both lost their wives and families to the Nazis. Both remarried in Israel; Mordechai's second wife was Miriam, the daughter of Rabbi Hershel Glick of Satmar. Only Mordechai had a child, Yissachar Dov. In November 1949, Mordechai died suddenly, and his son was raised by his uncle, Aharon, who groomed him to be the next Rebbe in the dynasty. When Aharon died, Yissachar Dov was still a young child.

== Early life and education ==
For most of the year, Yissachar Dov lived near his uncle in Tel Aviv, and studied in the Belzer Talmud Torah there; he spent the summer months in Jerusalem, studying in the Satmar Talmud Torah.

When Aharon died in 1957, Yissachar Dov was only nine years old. For the next nine years, Belz was effectively without an active rebbe, as Yissachor Dov, then called the "Yanuka" (Child) by his followers, was educated by a small circle of trusted advisors. A few years after Rebbe Aharon's death, Yissachar Dov entered the Belzer yeshiva in Jerusalem, where he was given two dormitory rooms – one which he shared with other students as a sleeping room, and a private room where he could study alone and with others. Every decision regarding the young boy was brought before Rabbi Yaakov Yitzchak Neiman, Rav of the Belzer community in Montreal and a relative of Yissachar Dov on his mother's side.

Yissachar Dov celebrated his bar mitzvah on 25 January 1961 (8 Shevat 5721) in the Tel Aviv beit medrash of Rebbe Aharon, where he sat by himself at the dais, greeting a few hundred guests. Back in yeshiva, he studied for many hours with private chavrusas (study partners), and prepared to receive rabbinic ordination. At the age of 15, he moved to an apartment which a group of Belzer Hasidim rented for him near the yeshiva, and began inviting other students to join him for Shabbat meals at which he delivered words of Torah and Hasidut.

At the age of 16, he was engaged to Sarah Hager, daughter of Rabbi Moshe Yehoshua Hager, then rosh yeshiva and av beis din (head of the rabbinical court) of Kiryat Vizhnitz, Bnei Brak (he succeeded his father as Vizhnitzer Rebbe in 1972). The wedding was held in February 1965 in Kiryat Vizhnitz, where the couple settled after their marriage. Shortly after their wedding, their home was burglarized and Sarah Hager's father cursed the culprit should he not return the stolen jewels. The thief's wife divorced him thereafter, the jewels were returned, and it is said the curses rained down on him.

In June 1966, a delegation of Belzer Hasidim approached Rokeach, and urged him to accept the mantle of leadership for the Belz Hasidim. Rokeach asked them to seek the opinion of other Torah leaders, whereupon they solicited the approval of the Klausenberger Rebbe and the Gerrer Rebbe. The new Rebbe became the fifth Belzer Rabbi in Jerusalem on 28 July 1966. Standing at the gravesite of his uncle, the previous Belzer Rav, Rokeach received his first kvitel from the Yavrover Rav, a descendant of the Belzer and Ropshitzer Rebbes, as is customary in Belz. He has led the dynasty ever since.

He and his wife have one son, Aharon Mordechai Rokeach, born on 12 October 1975. Aharon Mordechai married Sarah Leah Lemberger, daughter of Rabbi Shimon Lemberger, Makova Rebbe in Kiryat Ata, on August 3, 1993, in Kiryat Belz, Jerusalem, in the presence of 60,000 people. The couple has ten sons and three daughters. On 21 May 2013, their eldest son, Sholom Rokeach, married Hanna Batya Penet, in a ceremony at the Belz Great Synagogue that was attended by tens of thousands of guests and well-wishers. With the birth of the young couple's daughter on 4 May 2014, the Rebbe became an elter zaida (great-grandfather).

== The re-invention of Belz ==
The majority of Belzer Hasidim were killed in the Holocaust. Although some managed to immigrate to the United States and Israel, the post-war years saw the court of Belz's membership undergo a radical change, consisting largely of former members of other communities, or Haredim who had previously not belonged officially to any Hasidic group.

One of the new Rebbe's most important tasks was to take this diverse collection of followers and mold them into a unified community. He focused on building up Belz institutions, which were largely non-existent at the death of the previous Rebbe. As Belz slowly established an economic base, it began expanding its network of schools in Western Europe, North America, and Israel, as well as its yeshivas and its own Jerusalem enclave, Kiryat Belz. It also created its own newspaper, HaMachaneh HaCharedi, of which MK Yisrael Eichler is a former editor.

Under Yissachar Dov's leadership, the Belz Hasidut has grown from a few hundred families in 1966 to over 8,000 families, as of 2025. Yissachar Dov also oversees a global network of study halls, educational institutions, and chesed institutions.

Yissachar Dov has also invested heavily in Orthodox Jewish outreach, with the founding of Yeshivas Torah V'Emunah, a ba'al teshuva yeshiva for men, and the Tzohar outreach organization for secular Jews.

While preserving the traditions established by his forebears, Yissachar Dov has also introduced new protocols to fit modern times. He was the first to bring professionals into the Hasidic educational system, to diagnose and treat children with learning disabilities. He also encourages his Hasidim to develop their talents within the community, finding jobs for musicians, writers, managers, etc., within the hundreds of institutions and organizations that the Hasidut has established.

Yissachar Dov was adamant to build an enormous shul at great cost to replicate the building of the Belz shul in Belz. The legend had it that the Sar Shalom fasted for 40 days and nights and was visited by Eliijah the Prophet who directed him how to build the original synagogue. In midst of building the Jerusalem synagogue, Yissachar Dov learned from his assistant that his personal investments were lost. The money pressures mounted and when he went to gather water for making Pesach Matzos in 1990, Yissachar Dov was so distraught he threw his Shtreimel (fur hat) on the ground. After this, the chassidim world-wide, established a new fundraising round to complete the building of the synagogue.

== An independent Rebbe ==
The Belzer Rebbe has long had a reputation for being a maverick in the Israeli Haredi community. The early years following his appointment as Rebbe saw him carefully forging alliances with other Hasidic courts (such as Ger and Vizhnitz), as well as the Misnagdic communities, particularly Degel HaTorah. He quickly became known as a political moderate and pragmatist, eventually even breaking what had earlier been something of a taboo: accepting funding and subsidies from the Israeli government.

=== Feud with the Edah HaChareidis ===
As Belz began to establish itself as an independent and successful group, it began to attract some negative attention, particularly after the Rebbe's decision to accept money from the State. One group, the Edah HaChareidis, a coalition of several movements known for its strictness and traditionalism even among Haredim, took particular offense at the "renegades'" disregard of what had earlier been a largely unchallenged status quo. This was compounded by the Rebbe's willingness to participate in Israeli politics by encouraging his followers to vote and sending emissaries to join Haredi political parties. These disagreements turned from mere hostilities into a full-blown feud, following the Rebbe's announcement in 1980 that Belz was going to split from the Edah HaCharedis.

Prior to the split, Belz had been the only non-Eidah member that accepted and supported the authority of the Badatz, the Edah's rabbinical court, whose authority touched all matters of everyday Haredi life, including kashrut certification. Early in the year, Rabbi Yitzchok Yaakov Weiss, the head of the Edah HaChareidis, issued a decree forbidding followers from sending their children to schools funded by State money. This represented a serious threat to Belz's moderate approach, which benefited greatly from State assistance.

In response, the Belzer Rebbe decided to cut his community off from the Edah HaChareidis, and to establish his own system of religious services, including kashrut certification. While Belz maintained that it was only interested in certifying food for its own community, the move was met with rancor by the Edah HaCharedis, particularly the Satmar Hasidim, who were both outraged at the Belzer Rebbe's defiance and concerned about Belz as potential economic competition.

This led to a large delegitimization campaign against the Belzer Rebbe. Later in the year, when he visited the United States, he was assigned a security detail by the FBI, in response to multiple death threats. The conflict in Israel, initially confined to insulting posters, gradually escalated to a series of particularly offensive pranks, and, ultimately, to physically violent clashes between followers. Neither the Belzer Rebbe nor Rabbi Weiss were ever involved in any of these activities, which are largely considered to have been the work of radical activists within both camps. Despite the opposition, Belz persevered, and tempers gradually cooled. While Belz and the Edah HaCharedis remain distant and implicitly hostile towards each other, the feud has, for all intents and purposes, ended.

== Quotes ==
Every Jew must firmly believe that inside him, there resides a pure soul. Regardless of what his situation may be, even if he has strayed from the right path, the inner essence of his soul — which is a portion of God — remains pure and unsullied. ... From this tiny center of the soul that has not been tainted by evil, the transgressor derives the strength to do teshuvah (repentance), make amends for all his failings, and soar to the loftiest spiritual heights. (1991)

Everyone knows that the Arabs residing in Eretz Yisrael (the Land of Israel) — descendants of Ishmael — have only one aim: to drive the Jewish people out of Eretz Yisrael and to annihilate them. Now, when the Jewish people conduct themselves in the proper manner, the Arabs most certainly will have no power to harm them. To the contrary, the Arabs themselves will vanish from the scene. But even when Jews do not behave quite as they should, then the Holy One, Blessed be He, compares His nation with the nations of the world. And when viewed together, He finds that the Jewish people are the acme of perfection. ... For the Jewish people, when measured against the nations of the world, are absolutely flawless. In this merit, the Jewish people will defeat their enemies and crush them. (1990)

== Rebbes of Belz ==
1. Rabbi Sholom Rokeach (1779–1855)
2. Rabbi Yehoshua Rokeach (1825–1894)
3. Rabbi Yissachar Dov Rokeach (1854–1926)
4. Rabbi Aharon Rokeach (1877–1957)
5. Rabbi Yissachar Dov Rokeach (b. 1948)

== See also ==
- Agudat Yisrael
- Belz (town in Poland/Ukraine)
- Belz Great Synagogue (the largest synagogue in Jerusalem)

== Sources ==
- Samuel C. Heilman (1999). Defenders of the Faith: Inside Ultra-Orthodox Jewry. University of California Press, ISBN 0-520-22112-5
- Ehud Sprinzak (1999). Brother Against Brother: Violence and Extremism in Israeli Politics from Altalena to the Rabin Assassination. Free Press, ISBN 0-684-85344-2
