= Mordechai Rokeach =

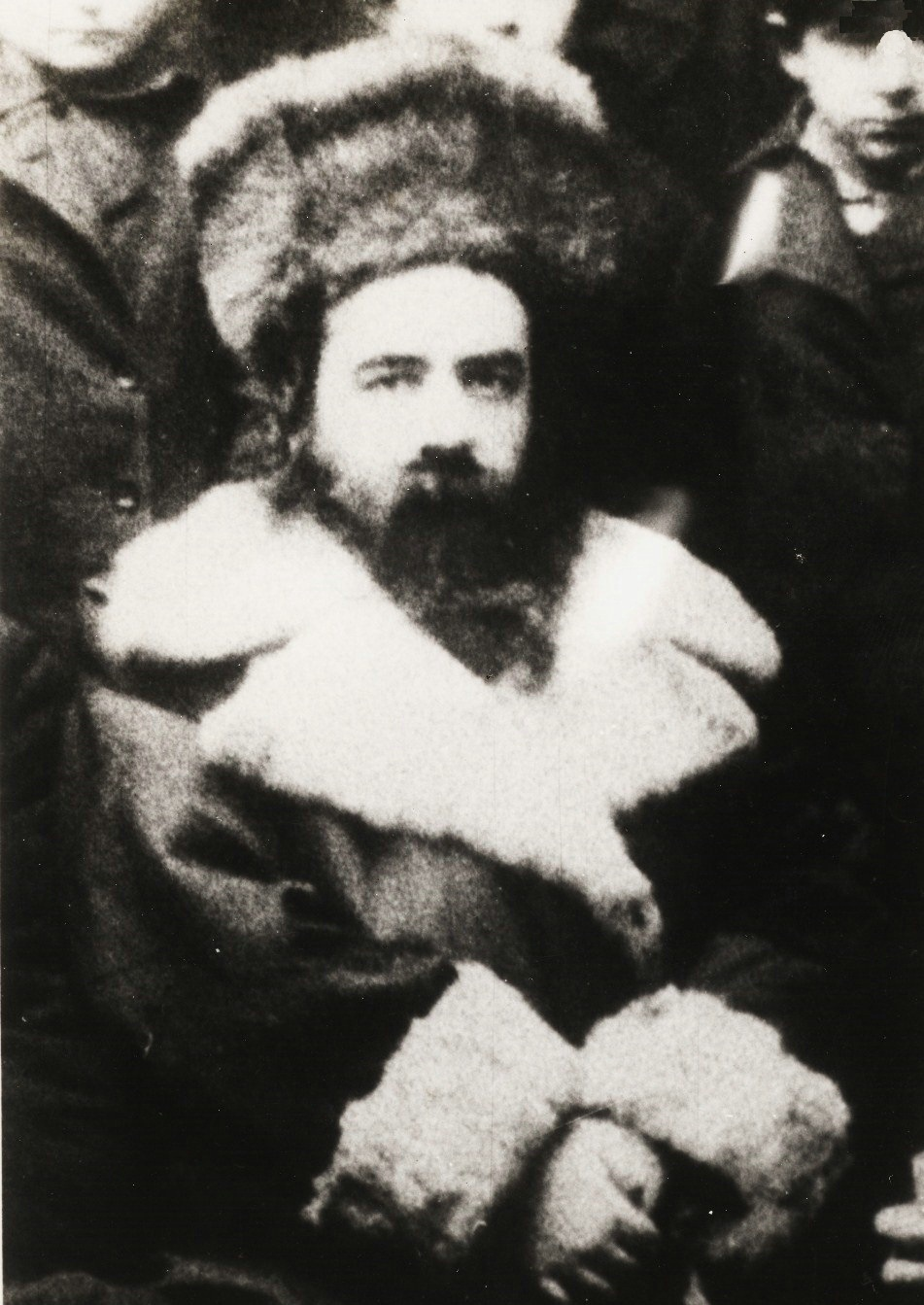
- Title: Bilgorayer Rav

Personal life
- Born: Mordechai Rokeach; 17 June 1902 Belz, Austrian Galicia
- Died: 17 November 1949 (aged 47) Tel Aviv, Israel
- Buried: Tiberias, Israel
- Spouse: Sheva Rabinowitz, Miriam Glick
- Children: Alte Bas Zion; Rivka Miriam, Yissachar Dov Rokeach
- Parents: Yissachar Dov Rokeach (father); Chaya Devorah Pecsenik (mother)

Religious life
- Religion: Judaism

Mordechai Rokeach (1902 – 17 November 1949), also known as Mordechai of Bilgoray, was a scion of the Belzer Hasidic dynasty and the right-hand man to his half-brother, Rebbe Aharon of Belz, the fourth Belzer Rebbe. He was the son (by the second marriage) of the third Belzer Rebbe, Rebbe Yissachar Dov Rokeach. His only son, Yissachar Dov Rokeach, is the fifth and current Belzer Rebbe.

From 1927 until the outbreak of World War II, Rabbi Mordechai served as Rav of the town of Biłgoraj, becoming known as the Bilgorayer Rav. During World War II, he famously accompanied his brother, Rebbe Aharon, on a daring escape out of Nazi-occupied Europe. The two reached Israel in February 1944, the only surviving members of their families, and threw themselves into rebuilding the ranks of Belzer Hasidut which had been decimated by the Holocaust.

== Biography ==
Rabbi Mordechai was one of seven children born to Rebbe Yissachar Dov Rokeach, the third Belzer Rebbe, in his second marriage to Chaya Devorah, daughter of Rabbi Avrohom Shmuel Pecsenik of Berezna. From his first wife, the Belzer Rebbe fathered two children, Aharon and Chana Rochel. Aharon was 22 years old at the time of Mordechai's birth.

Rebbe Yissachar Dov closely supervised Mordechai's Torah education, learning with him for three hours nightly. Reb Mottele, as he was popularly called, became known for his diligence in Torah study, his breadth of knowledge and his skills as an orator. He got along well with people, a trait that would serve him later on as a town Rav and as a spokesman for Belz Hasidut in Israel. He was also quite humble.

He married Sheva, the daughter of Rabbi Moshe Aharon Rabinowitz, the Kobriner Rav. His eldest daughter, Alte Bas Zion, died in 1931 at the age of 3; his second daughter, Rivka Miriam, was murdered by the Nazis together with his wife in Kobrin after he had fled with the Rebbe.

In 1920, he accepted the position of Rav of Biłgoraj. Though his father gave his blessing, Rabbi Mordechai did not assume this post until after his father's death in 1926; at that time, his brother Aharon, the newly appointed Rebbe, gave his blessing to the move.

In Biłgoraj, Rabbi Mordechai served as the spiritual leader, educator and av beit din. He conducted tishen on Shabbat and Yom Tov, at which he delivered divrei Torah in the style of the Belzer Rebbes. He also accepted kvitlach and pidyonot from people seeking his blessing and prayers. He established a Talmud Torah in the city and provided for the spiritual and physical needs of the students. A photograph taken for a philanthropist in the United States who had sent a donation of new clothing for the children shows him surrounded by his students.

Notwithstanding his prominence, Rabbi Mordechai always subordinated himself to his brother, Aharon. He consulted with him on every issue, attended his court on Shabbat, and even gave him kvitlach with the names of his family members. He used to say, "When I want to enter my brother's room, I am overcome by fear, knowing who it is I am going to see. I try to turn back, due to my great fear. But one must go in!"

== Escape from Europe ==
With the outbreak of World War II and the German invasion of Poland, the town of Biłgoraj was bombed from the air and most of its residents fled. Rabbi Mordechai and his family followed the refugees to Poritsc, several kilometers north of Sokal, and then to Berezhany. Meanwhile, Belzer Hasidim in Israel, England and the United States arranged to spirit the Rebbe out of Belz to Sokal and then to Przemyslany, where he remained for nearly a year. With the onset of Operation Barbarossa on 22 June 1941, Sokal, on the front lines, fell to the Germans on the first day; Prezemyslany was conquered by July 1. The Rebbe went into hiding and narrowly avoided capture by German patrols, but he would not escape further without his brother at his side. Rabbi Mordechai sent his wife and daughter to her father's house in Kobrin, while Rebbe Aharon's wife and five unmarried children stayed in Przemyslany under the care of one of his Hasidim. They were all subsequently murdered by the Nazis.

Due to the untiring efforts and cash inflow from Belzer Hasidim abroad, the Rebbe and Rabbi Mordechai managed to stay one step ahead of the Nazis in one miraculous escape attempt after another. Together with two Hasidim, they were spirited into Wiśnicz, then the Bochnia Ghetto, then the Kraków Ghetto, and then back into Bochnia, narrowly avoiding Gestapo roundups and deportations.

In their most hair-raising escape attempt, the brothers were driven out of occupied Poland and into Hungary by a Hungarian counter-intelligence agent who was friendly to Jews. The Rebbe, his attendant and Rabbi Mordechai, shorn of their distinctive beards and sidelocks, were disguised as Russian generals who had been captured at the front and were being taken to Budapest for questioning.

Rebbe Aharon and Rabbi Mordechai spent eight months in Budapest before receiving highly rationed Jewish Agency certificates to enter Israel. Their decision to leave Europe was protested by the Hungarian Jewish community, which desired their continuing presence, but when they finalized their plans, the community made them guests of honor at a farewell evening attended by thousands. Rabbi Mordechai delivered a lengthy speech combining Torah thoughts with commentary on the political situation, exhorting his audience to use their charity money to ransom Jews trapped in German-occupied Europe and also to feed and clothe those who had managed to escape to then-free Hungary.

In January 1944 the two boarded the Orient Express to Istanbul. After crossing the Bosphorus straits by ferry, they were subject to a vigorous search and debriefing by the British secret service as "aliens" from Nazi-occupied territory. The Rebbe, who generally weighed each question before answering it, exasperated the interrogator, who ordered the Rebbe and his brother arrested and held in the basement of the Syrian police house, together with another fifteen Jewish fugitives from Nazi Europe. Israel Chief Rabbi Chaim Herzog, who had planned to be in Turkey with a mission of rescue activists so he could greet the Rebbe upon his arrival, interceded with the British general, who agreed to release the weak and fragile Rebbe. Rabbi Mordechai was released later that evening, and the pair took the first train to Tripoli the next morning. On the outskirts of Beirut, they were greeted by a crowd of 200 Sephardim and 20 Israeli businessmen and hosted to a reception by local rabbis and dignitaries. They arrived at the old border station near Naqoura, Lebanon, on 3 February 1944 (9 Shevat 5704 – a date celebrated by Belzer Hasidim). Upon crossing the border into Israel, the Rebbe tore kriah. Thousands came out to greet them at each of their stops in Haifa, Tel Aviv and Jerusalem. They were also given positive newspaper coverage by religious and secular papers alike.

== In Israel ==
Rabbi Mordechai continued to serve as his brother's right hand after the war, refusing to take a rabbinical position but dedicating his efforts to strengthening Torah Judaism and Belzer Hasidut. He chaired the Rebbe's planning committee for the first Belz Talmud Torah in Tel Aviv and yeshiva in Jerusalem, and represented the Rebbe at most events and conferences. The Rebbe consulted with him before every major decision. He also acceded to the Rebbe's request to live near him in Tel Aviv, even after he remarried, as the Rebbe explained, "Heaven forbid that he leave me! For he is my right hand, and it is impossible that I be left without him!"

With the war in Europe still raging, Rabbi Mordechai gave many speeches and newspaper interviews to publicize the full scope of the Nazis' murderous activities and arouse public opinion. At a routine foundation-stone laying for a new aron kodesh at Haifa's central beth midrash, for example, he spoke passionately and at length about the Holocaust:

I have discovered that the public in the Holy Land does not fully believe the terrible horror that has befallen our nation in exile. Sadly, the bitter truth is many, many times worse than anything you have heard. All that is known in the free world is but a drop in the ocean of massacres battering European Jewry. To all those doubters, I can bear witness from my own personal experience that all current descriptions are as nothing compared with the awful truth. On leaving Hungary, I saw with my own eyes wagonloads of Italian Jews being transported to their death in Poland. Elderly, women, young children, pushing their shrunken hands through the bars, begging for "Water! Water!" But the Gestapo police did not allow anyone to approach the death train and assist the captives. I saw prisoners crazed from thirst attacking each other and biting their flesh. People talk glibly about the murder of thousands of children. But no words can possibly describe how Nazis kill children. They even force the mothers to witness the "ceremony" of their children's massacre! There have been cases where the parents have been forced from their beds to be present at the execution. Just to multiply the pain and torture…

As Israeli public opinion warmed to the horrors in Europe, the Belzer Rebbe called on the Gerrer Rebbe, Rabbi Avraham Mordechai Alter, to join him in proclaiming a World Fast and Day of Prayer on 23 March 1944 (28 Adar). The event, coming on the heels of the German invasion of Hungary, was attended by thousands. Rabbi Mordechai spoke for a full 90 minutes. He was also heavily involved in helping war survivors obtain government benefits, housing and employment, and arranging weddings on their behalf.

=== Remarriage ===
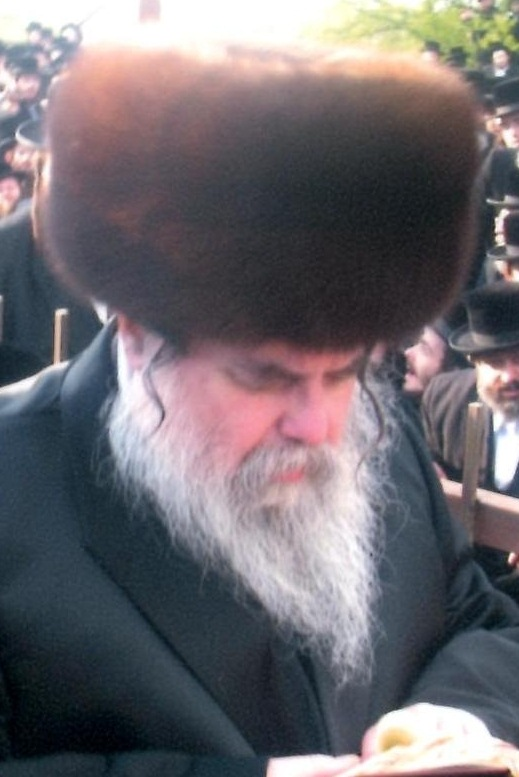
Rabbi Yissachar Dov Rokeach, fifth Belzer rebbe

Having lost their entire families in the Holocaust, both Rebbe Aharon and Rabbi Mordechai remarried in Israel. Rabbi Mordechai remarried in 1947 to Miriam, the daughter of Rabbi Tzvi (Hershel) Glick of Satmar. Their only child, Yissachar Dov, was born on 19 January 1948. Rebbe Aharon also remarried in 1947, but his second marriage did not produce children.

=== Belz historian ===
Rabbi Mordechai served as a link between the Belz community of old and the new community that his brother was establishing in Israel through his recording of every custom and practice that he had seen done in Belz. He was originally commissioned to write down these notes by his father, the third Belzer Rebbe. In the early years in Israel, Rebbe Aharon urged him to continue. At that time, paper was scarce, so Rabbi Mordechai recorded his memories on scraps of paper, envelopes and wedding invitations.

These scraps were discovered in the home of his widow in late 2009, causing his son and current Rebbe, Rabbi Yissachar Dov, to change his levush (wardrobe) in the middle of Hanukkah. The Rebbe appeared in the Belzer shul wearing a spodik instead of the usual kolpik, as his father's papers had revealed that Belzer Rebbes wore the kolpik for traveling and the spodik at home, not the other way around (as had been done in the Rebbe's court until then).

== Final days ==
In the summer of 1949, Rebbe Aharon sent his brother on a mission to strengthen and encourage survivors and the nascent Belzer communities in Europe. Rabbi Mordechai traveled to Paris, Zurich and Antwerp to convey the Rebbe's personal message. He impressed many with his Torah knowledge and powers of oration. He would often share divrei Torah that he had heard from his father, the previous Belzer Rebbe, and kept a notebook of all the divrei Torah he remembered. After his death, his rebbetzin wanted to keep the notebook for herself. One of his relatives sat in her house for an entire day to copy the whole notebook so that his brother, Rebbe Aharon, could also benefit from his father's divrei Torah.

At the end of the summer, Rabbi Mordechai told his companions that his father had appeared to him in a dream and instructed him to return home immediately. He returned to Israel before Yom Kippur and fell ill during the Sukkot holiday. He underwent major surgery on 17 November and did not survive. He died on 17 November 1949 (25 Cheshvan 5710), and was buried in Tiberias in a funeral attended by thousands.

His only son, Yissachar Dov, was raised by Rebbe Aharon. After Rebbe Aharon's death in 1957, the boy was educated by a small circle of trusted advisors. He became the fifth Belzer Rebbe in 1966. Rebbe Yissachar Dov named his only son, Aharon Mordechai Rokeach, born in 1975, after his uncle and his father.
