= Aharon Rokeach =

Ukrainian-Israeli Hasidic Rebbe (1880–1957)

- אהרן רוקח
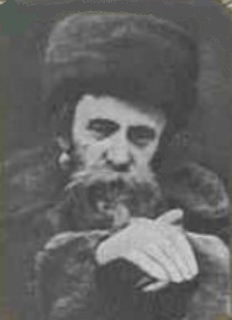
- Title: Fourth Belzer Rebbe

Personal life
- Born: Aharon Rokeach; 1880 Belz, Austrian Galicia
- Died: 18 August 1957 (aged 76–77) Jerusalem
- Buried: Har HaMenuchot
- Spouse: Malka Rokeach, Chana Labin-Pollack
- Children: Moshe; Yisrael; Yehuda Zundel; Rivka Miriam; Mirel; Adel; Sara Bracha; 2 other sons
- Parents: Yissachar Dov Rokeach (father); Basha Ruchama Twersky (mother)
- Dynasty: Belz

Religious life
- Religion: Judaism

Jewish leader
- Predecessor: Yissachar Dov Rokeach
- Successor: Yissachar Dov Rokeach
- Dynasty: Belz

Aharon Rokeach (Hebrew: אהרן רוקח; 19 December 1880 – 18 August 1957) was the fourth Rebbe of the Belz Hasidic dynasty. He led the movement from 1926 until he died in 1957.

Rokeach inherited the mantle of leadership from his father, Yissachar Dov Rokeach, upon the latter's death in 1926. Known for his piety and mysticism, Rokeach was called the "Wonder Rabbi" by Jews and Gentiles alike for the miracles he purportedly performed.

His reign as Rebbe saw the devastation of the Belz community, along with that of many other Hasidic sects in Galicia and elsewhere in Poland during the Holocaust. During the Holocaust, Rebbe Aharon was high on the list of Gestapo targets as a high-profile Rebbe. With the support and financial assistance of Belzer Hasidim in Mandatory Palestine, England, and the United States, he and his half-brother, Rabbi Mordechai of Bilgoray, managed to escape from Poland into Hungary, then into Turkey, Lebanon, and finally into Mandatory Palestine in February 1944. After Rabbi Mordechai's sudden death in November 1949, Rokeach raised his half-brother's year-old son, Yissachar Dov, and groomed him to succeed him as Belzer Rebbe.

== Early life ==
Rokeach was the first child born to his parents, Rabbi Yissachar Dov Rokeach and Basha Ruchama Twersky, after 12 years of marriage. He was named after his mother's grandfather, Rebbe Aharon of Chernobyl, although his father later revealed that he intended to name the boy after Rabbi Aharon of Karlin. Aharon had a younger sister, Chana Rachel, who later married Rabbi Pinchas Twersky of Ostilla.

Rokeach's mother died on 18 March 1884 when he was four years old. His grandfather, Rebbe Yehoshua Rokeach, the second Belzer Rebbe, took the boy under his wing and oversaw his spiritual development. As he grew, he spent much of his day ensconced in Torah learning and ate and slept little. He also concealed his accomplishments with a modesty that would last throughout his lifetime.

When his grandfather died on 30 January 1894, Rokeach's father became the third Belzer Rebbe. Rebbe Yissachar Dov remarried Chaya Devora Pecsenik and had another seven children. Rokeach was 22 years old when his half-brother Mordechai was born.

When he came of age, Rokeach married his cousin, Malka, the daughter of his father's elder brother Shmuel, the Rav of Sokal. After his marriage, he lived with his father-in-law for several years. His strict regime of seclusion, deprivation, and asceticism caused him to become seriously weakened, whereupon his doctors recommended a complete change of locale and sent him to a spa. Though he recuperated at the health resort of Kreniec, he still ate little, and his chronic sleep deprivation made it difficult for him to stand or walk quickly. On Shabbat, however, he would stand upright, walk quickly, and partake in the Shabbat meals with obvious pleasure.

He and his wife had five sons and four daughters. Several healthy children died at birth, while those who survived were sickly and weak. Two daughters were both hearing- and speech-impaired. One daughter, Mirel, died in 1938; the rest were killed by the Nazis with their families.

When Rokeach's father, Rebbe Yissachar Dov, died in Belz on Friday night, 30 October 1926, his 46-year-old son accepted the mantle of leadership at the funeral held after Shabbat.

== Becoming the Rebbe ==
While he continued to live a Spartan and reclusive existence, Rokeach revealed himself to be a warm and caring leader. He read each kvitel with great interest and prayed for the petitioner's salvation and success. At first, he tried to limit the number of petitioners who sought his counsel and blessing to five per night, saying, "I simply can't take these tzoros (tribulations) of Klal Yisrael!" as he felt each problem as deeply as if it were his own. But eventually, he allowed many petitioners to see him nightly.

Although the position of Belzer rav included being rabbi of the local township, Rokeach said he could not spare any more time. Two dayanim were appointed for this task, and they consulted with Rokeach only on difficult halakhic questions.

== Escape from Europe ==
During World War II, Belzer Hasidim both inside and outside Nazi-occupied Europe saw saving the Rebbe as their primary goal. They spirited Rokeach — who insisted on being accompanied by his half-brother, Rabbi Mordechai — out of Belz into Wiśnicz, then into the Bochnia Ghetto, then into the Kraków Ghetto, and then back into the Bochnia Ghetto, narrowly avoiding Gestapo roundups and deportations.

In their most hair-raising escape attempt, the brothers were driven out of occupied Poland and into Hungary by a Hungarian counter-intelligence agent who was friendly to Jews. Rokeach, his attendant, and Rabbi Mordechai, shorn of their distinctive beards and sidelocks, were disguised as Russian generals who had been captured at the front and were being taken to Budapest for questioning. After spending eight months in Hungary, the brothers boarded the Orient Express to Istanbul and finally arrived in Mandatory Palestine in February 1944.

Both men lost their entire families to the Nazis. Rokeach's eldest son, Moshe, was burned alive in the Przemyslany shul at the same time as Rokeach was in hiding in that town. Later, Rabbi Moshe's wife and five children were murdered. Rokeach's eldest daughter, Rivka Miriam, and her husband, Rabbi Shmiel Frankel, both perished along with their seven children. Rokeach's other daughters, Adel Twersky and Sara Bracha Rosenfeld with their children, and two other sons, Rabbi Yisrael and Rabbi Yehudah Zundel with their children, were also slain. When he heard of these tragedies, Rokeach displayed no emotion. Stoically, he continued to lead his Hasidim and perform his devotions.

== Activities in Israel ==
Rokeach devoted the rest of his life to rebuilding Belzer Hasidut in Israel. He initially established his court in Tel Aviv, where he opened the first Belzer Talmud Torah. Later he moved to Jerusalem, where he founded the first Belzer yeshiva.

In 1949, he married Chana Labin-Pollack, daughter of Rabbi Yechiel Chaim Labin, the Makova Rebbe, and widow of Rabbi Yosef Meir Pollack, the Bergsass Rebbe. Her first husband had been murdered by the Nazis in Bergsass, leaving her with a young son and daughter. Rokeach did not have any children by his second wife, but helped to raise her children and later arranged marriages for them. Meanwhile, Rabbi Mordechai also remarried and had a son, Yissachar Dov, on January 19, 1948. When Rabbi Mordechai suddenly died on November 17, 1949, Rokeach groomed his year-old nephew to inherit the dynasty. After Rokeach died in 1957, the boy was educated by a small circle of trusted advisors and became the fifth Belzer Rebbe in 1966.

Rokeach was touched by the Holocaust. He developed a very inclusive attitude to modern and even non-Orthodox Jews, a substantive change from his pre-war practice of associating almost exclusively with other Haredim. Rokeach's second marriage also indicated a shift in the Belz leader's thinking: the ceremony was conducted by Rabbi Isser Yehuda Unterman, a member of the religious Zionist Mizrachi movement, a group Belz had previously held at arm's length. Unlike some of his other Hasidic rebbe peers, who had survived the Holocaust and made a practice of acknowledging and honoring their deceased followers and recounting their own experiences, it was Rokeach's custom to never speak of the Belz Hasidim who had died during the war, particularly members of his own family. On one occasion, rabbi and author Arthur Hertzberg, a descendant of Belz Hasidim, visited the rebbe and attempted to talk to him about Belz before the war:

He talked willingly of [my] grandfather, remembering that ... [he] had been his teacher when he was young, but he was silent when I mentioned my mother's father and her brothers, who had been his disciples until they were murdered during the war. I was upset. This strange behavior was later explained to me by his principal assistant: the rebbe had not once said any of the prescribed prayers (Yizkor, Kaddish) for his wife and children because those who had been killed by the Nazis for being Jews were of transcendent holiness; they were beyond our comprehension. Any words about them that we might utter were irrelevant and perhaps even a desecration of their memory.

== Rebbes of Belz ==
1. Rabbi Sholom Rokeach (1779–1855)
2. Rabbi Yehoshua Rokeach (1825–1896)
3. Rabbi Yissachar Dov Rokeach (1854–1926)
4. Rabbi Aharon Rokeach (1877–1957)
5. Rabbi Yissachar Dov Rokeach (b. 1948)

== See also ==
- Agudat Israel
- Belz (town in Poland/Ukraine)
- Belz Beis HaMedrash HaGadol (the largest synagogue in Jerusalem)
- Belz (Hasidic dynasty)
- Ger (Hasidic dynasty)
- Vizhnitz (Hasidic dynasty)
