= Belz =

City in Lviv Oblast, Ukraine

Belz Белз
- City
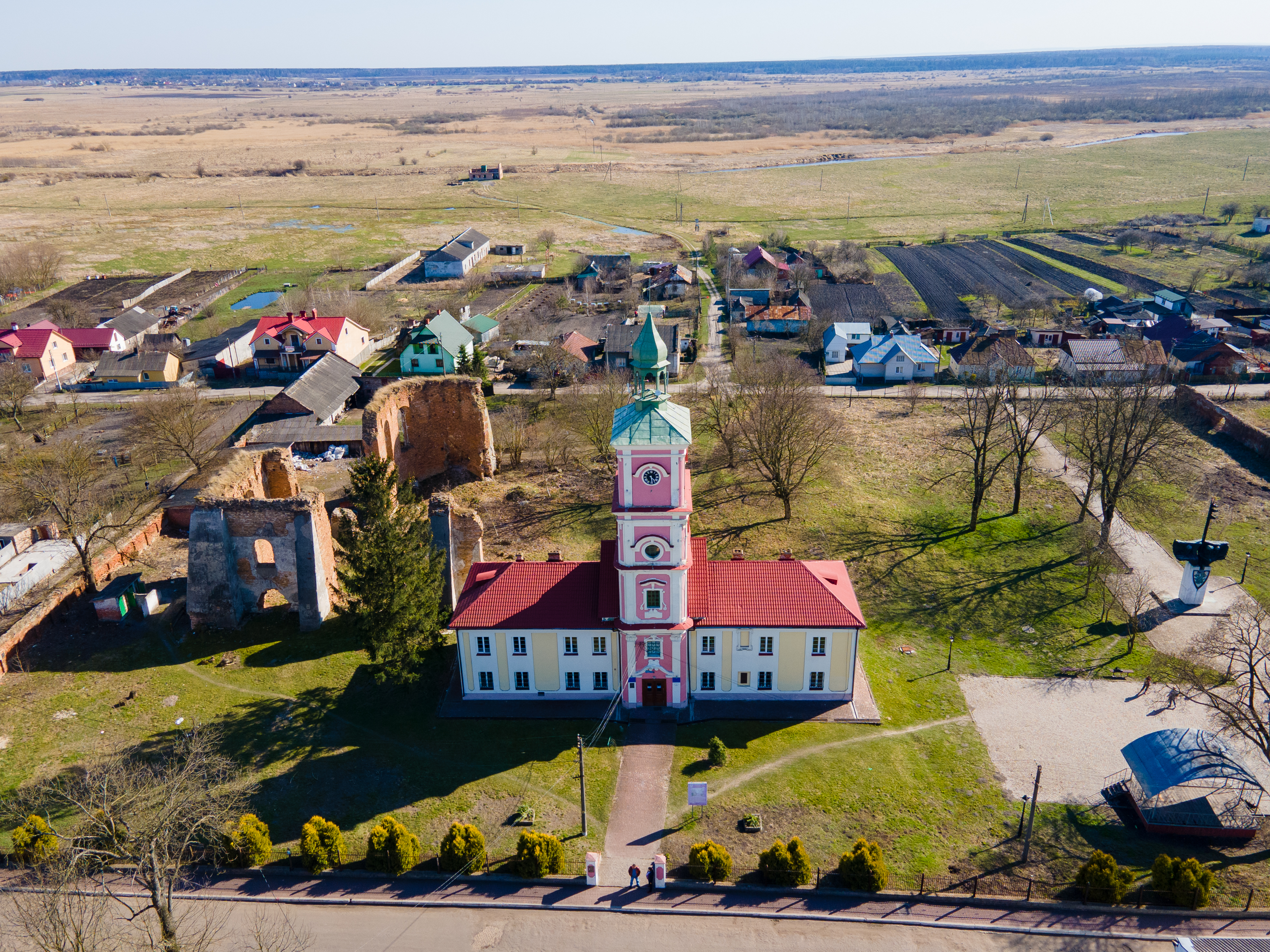
- City Hall

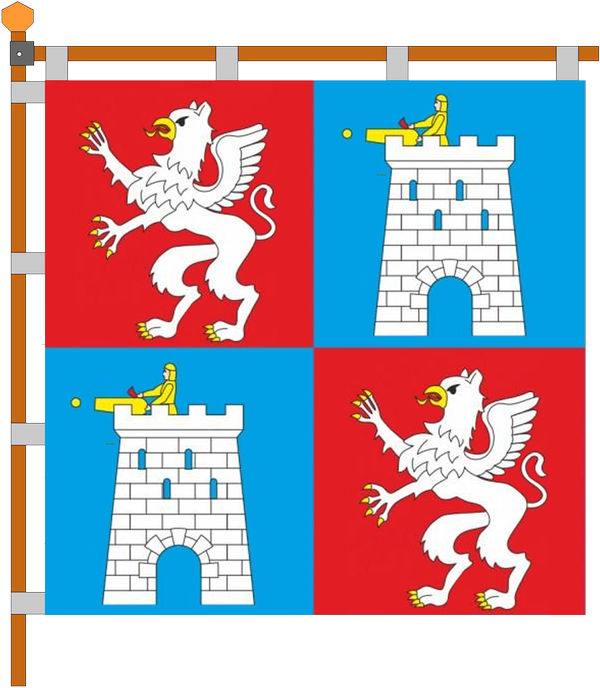
- Flag Coat of arms
- Interactive map of Belz
- Location in Lviv Oblast Location in Ukraine
- Coordinates: 50.38°N 24.02°E
- Country: Ukraine
- Oblast: Lviv Oblast
- Raion: Sheptytskyi Raion
- Hromada: Belz urban hromada

Government
  - Mayor: Volodymyr Mukha

Area
  - Total: 5.85 km^{2} (2.26 sq mi)
- Elevation: 200 m (660 ft)

Population (2022)
  - Total: 2,191
  - Density: 375/km^{2} (970/sq mi)
- Zip Code: 80065
- Area code: +380 3257

Belz (Ukrainian: Белз, IPA: [bɛlz]; Polish: Bełz; Yiddish: בעלז) is a small city in Lviv Oblast, western Ukraine, located near the border with Poland between the Solokiya River (a tributary of the Bug River) and the Richytsia stream. Belz hosts the administration of Belz urban hromada, one of the hromadas of Ukraine. Its population is approximately 2,191 (2022 estimate).

== History ==
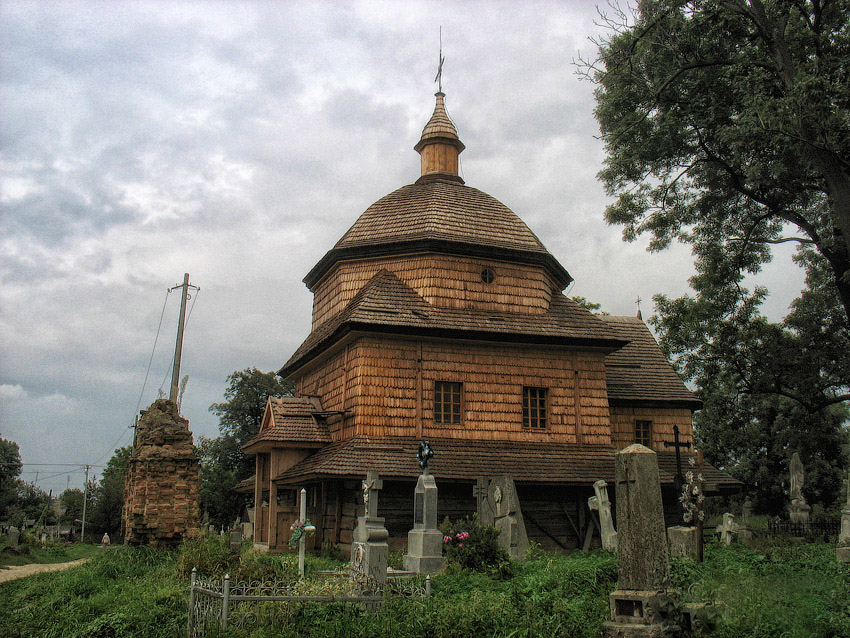
Saint Paraskeva's wooden church in Belz

Historical affiliations

Duchy of Poland 970 - 981
Kievan Rus 981-1018
Duchy of Poland 1018-1025
Kingdom of Poland 1025-1031
Kievan Rus 1031-1234
Kingdom of Rus 1234-1340
Grand Duchy of Lithuania 1340-1366
Kingdom of Poland 1366-1377
Kingdom of Hungary 1378-1387
Kingdom of Poland 1387-1569
Polish–Lithuanian Commonwealth 1569-1772
Habsburg monarchy 1772-1804
Austrian Empire 1804-1867
Austria-Hungary 1867-1918
West Ukrainian People's Republic 1918-1919
Second Polish Republic 1919-1939
Nazi Germany 1939-1944
Polish People's Republic 1944-1951
Soviet Union 1951-1991
Ukraine 1991-present

=== Early history ===
Belz is situated in a fertile plain which tribes of Indo-European origin settled in ancient times: Celtic Lugii, next (2nd-5th century) Germanic Goths, Slavized Sarmatians (White Croats), and at last Slavic Dulebes (later Buzhans), who eventually become part of the Kievan Rus' in 907, when Dulebs took part in a military campaign of Oleg of Kiev against Tsargrad (Constantinople). Mainly рolish historiography located here also Lendians tribe whо also paid tribute to Kievan Rus'.

The town has existed at least since the 10th century as one of the Cherven Cities which were under Polish rule in the 970s. In 981 Belz was incorporated into Kievan Rus'. In 1170, the town became the seat of the Duchy of Belz. During the Wars of the Galician Succession the city and surrounding areas were plundered by the army of prince Daniel of Galicia and his brother Vasylko Romanovych. In 1234 it was incorporated into the Duchy of Galicia–Volhynia, which would control Belz until 1340 when it came under Lithuanian rule.

Belz was under Polish rule from 1366 to 1772, first as a fief, and since 1462 as the capital of the Belz Voivodeship. On October 5, 1377, the town was granted the Magdeburg rights] by Władysław Opolczyk, the governor of Red Ruthenia. A charter dated November 10, 1509 once again granted Belz privileges under the Magdeburg rights.

In 1772, upon the First Partition of Poland, Belz was incorporated into the Habsburg Empire (later Austrian Empire and Austro-Hungarian Empire) where it was a part of the Kingdom of Galicia and Lodomeria.

Belz received a railway connection in 1884 with the opening of the railway line Jarosław–Kowel.

=== Modern history ===
With the collapse of Austria-Hungary following World War I in November 1918, Belz was included in the Western Ukrainian People's Republic. It came under Polish control in 1919 during the Polish-Ukrainian War. In April 1920, the Second Polish Republic, represented by Józef Piłsudski, and the Ukrainian People's Republic, represented by Symon Petlura signed the Treaty of Warsaw, in which they agreed that the Polish-Ukrainian border in Western Ukraine would follow the Zbruch River. This left Belz, along with the rest of Eastern Galicia in the Polish Republic.

From 1919 to 1939 Belz was annexed to the Lviv Voivodeship, Second Polish Republic.

From 1939 to 1944 Belz was occupied by Germany as a part of the General Government. Belz is situated on left, north waterside of the Solokiya river (affluent of the Bug river), which was the German-Soviet border in 1939–1941. During the war, the delegation of the Hrubeshiv Ukrainian Relief Committee operated in the city.

After the war Belz reverted to Poland (where it was again within the Lublin Voivodeship) until 1951 when, after a border readjustment, it passed to the Soviet Union (Ukrainian Soviet Socialist Republic). (See: 1951 Polish–Soviet territorial exchange) Since 1991 it has been part of independent Ukraine.

Until 18 July 2020, Belz belonged to Sokal Raion. The raion was abolished in July 2020 as part of the administrative reform of Ukraine, which reduced the number of raions of Lviv Oblast to seven. The area of Sokal Raion was merged into Chervonohrad Raion (modern Sheptytskyi Raion).

== Jewish history ==
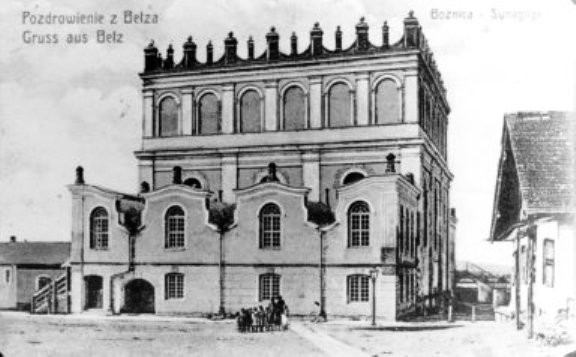
Belz hasidic synagogue. Dedicated in 1843, it was destroyed by the Nazis during World War II, and demolished in the 1950s; Rebbe Rokeach had personally helped build this large and imposing synagogue.

The Ashkenazi Jewish community in Belz was established circa 14th century. In 1665, the Jews in Belz received equal rights and duties. The town became home to a Hasidic dynasty in the early 19th century.

The Rabbi of Belz, Shalom Rokeach (1779–1855), also known as the Sar Shalom, joined the Hasidic movement by studying with the Maggid of Lutzk, and established the community and become the first Belzer Rebbe, thereby establishing the Belz Hasidic dynasty. When Rebbe Shalom died in 1855, his youngest son, Rebbe Yehoshua Rokeach (1855–1894), became the next Rebbe. Belzer Hasidism grew in size during the tenure of Rebbe Yehoshua's son and successor, Rebbe Yissachar Dov Rokeach (third Belzer Rebbe)(1894–1926). Rebbe Yissachar Dov's son and successor, Rebbe Aharon Rokeach (1880 to 1957), escaped from Nazi-occupied Europe to Israel in 1944, re-establishing the Hasidut first in Tel Aviv and then in Jerusalem. For recent history see Belz (Hasidic dynasty) § Belz today.

At the beginning of World War I, Belz had 6100 inhabitants, including 3600 Jews, 1600 Ukrainians, and 900 Poles. During the German and Soviet invasion of Poland (September 1939), most of the Jews of Belz fled to the Soviet Union in Autumn 1939 (the German–Soviet Treaty of Friendship, Cooperation and Demarcation). However, by May 1942, there were over 1,540 local Jewish residents and refugees in Belz. On June 2, 1942, 1,000 Jews were deported to Hrubieszów and from there to Sobibor extermination camp. Another 504 were brought to Hrubieszów in September of that year, after they were no longer needed to work on the farms in the area.

== Cultural trivia ==
The Yiddish song “Beltz, Mayn Shtetele” is a moving evocation of a happy childhood spent in a shtetl. Originally this song was composed for a town which bears a similar-sounding name in Yiddish (belts), called Bălți in Romanian, which is located in Bessarabia (currently in Moldova). Later interpretations may have had Belz in mind, though. The song has special significance in Holocaust history, as a 16-year-old playing the song was overheard by an SS guard at Auschwitz extermination camp, who then forced the child to play it repeatedly to ease the moods of Jews being herded into the gas chambers.

Belz is also a very important place for Ukrainian Catholics and Polish Catholics as a place where the Black Madonna of Częstochowa (this icon was believed to have been painted by St. Luke the Evangelist) had resided for several centuries until 1382, when Władysław Opolczyk, duke of Opole, took the icon home to his principality after ending his service as the Royal emissary for Halychyna for Louis I of Hungary.

Literature – Belles-lettres: a poem Maria: A Tale of the Ukraine written by Antoni Malczewski, and a novel Starościna Bełska: opowiadanie historyczne 1770–1774 by Józef Ignacy Kraszewski.

== Notable people ==
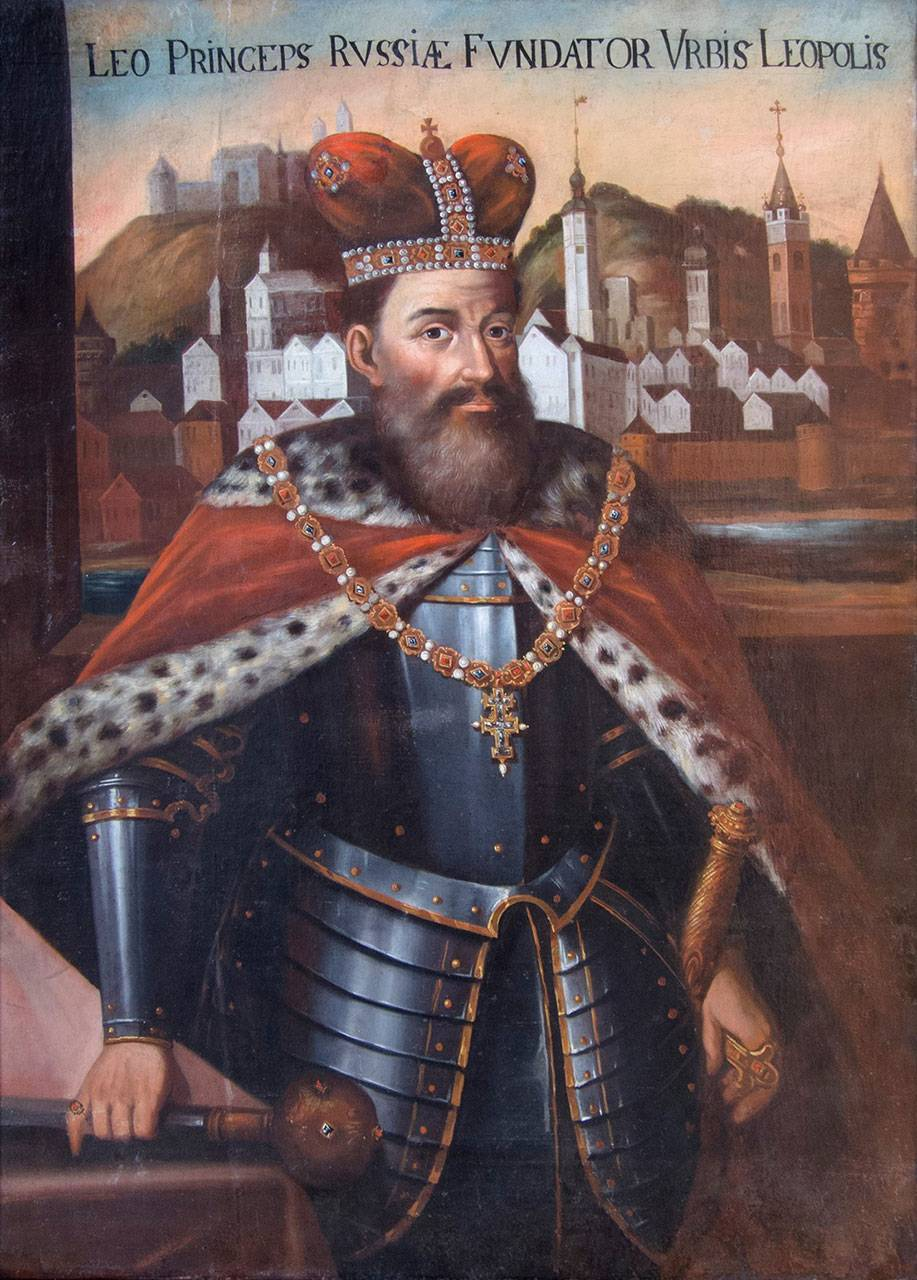
Leo I of Galicia

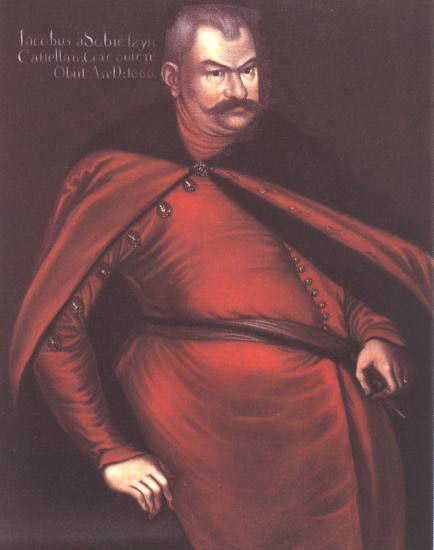
Jakub Sobieski

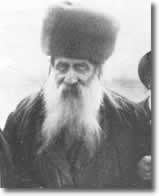
Rabbi Yissachar Dov Rokeach of Belz

- Vsevolod Mstislavich of Volhynia, prince of Belz (1170–1196)
- Vasilko Romanovich, prince of Belz (1207–1211)
- Alexander Vsevolodovich, prince of Belz (1212–1234)
- Daniel of Galicia, prince of Belz (1234–1245)
- Lev I of Galicia, prince of Belz (1245–1264)
- Yuri I of Galicia, prince of Belz (1264–1301)
- Andrew of Galicia, prince of Belz (1308–1323)
- Boleslaw-Yuri II of Galicia, Polish–Lithuanian-Ruthenian prince of Belz (1323–1340)
- Yuri Narimuntovich (Jurgis Narimantaitis), Lithuanian, prince of Belz (1340–1377)
- Władysław Opolczyk, Silesian duke, Hungarian governor (1377–1378)
- Siemowit IV, Duke of Masovia, prince of Belz (1388–1426)
- Jaśko Mazowita, prefect of Belz (14th–15th centuries)
- Casimir II of Belz, prince of Belz (1434–1442)
- Jan Kamieniecki (1463–1513), starost of Belz
- Mikołaj Sieniawski (c. 1489–1569), voivode of Belz
- Jan Firlej (c. 1521–1574), voivode of Belz
- Jan Zamoyski (1542–1605), starost of Belz
- Yoel Sirkis (1561–1640), the Bach, later rabbi of Krakow, one of the Acharonim
- Rafał Leszczyński (1579–1636), voivode of Belz
- Jakub Sobieski (1580–1646), voivode of Belz
- Dymitr Jerzy Wiśniowiecki (1631–1682), voivode of Belz
- Marcin Zamoyski (c.1637–1689), starost of Belz
- Stefan Aleksander Potocki, voivode of Belz
- Adam Mikołaj Sieniawski (1666–1726), voivode of Belz
- Stanisław Mateusz Rzewuski (1642–1728), voivode of Belz
- Stanisław Szczęsny Potocki (1753–1805), starost of Belz
- Sholom Rokeach (1779–1855), the first Rebbe of Belz
- Malka Rokeach (1780–1853), the first rebbetzin of Belz
- Yehoshua Rokeach (1825–1894), the second Rebbe of Belz
- Yissachar Dov Rokeach (1854–1926), the third Rebbe of Belz
- Aharon Rokeach (1877–1957), the fourth Rebbe of Belz
- Mordechai Rokeach (1902–1949), rabbi of Bilgoraj, son of the third Belzer Rebbe, half-brother and spokesman for the fourth Rebbe and father of the fifth Rebbe

== See also ==
- Belz (Hasidic dynasty)
- Polish-Soviet border adjustment treaty
