= Polish–Soviet border treaty =

Polish-Soviet border treaty may refer to:

- Border Agreement between Poland and the USSR of 16 August 1945
- 1951 Polish–Soviet territorial exchange
