= Belz Great Synagogue =

Large Hasidic synagogue in Jerusalem

- Hebrew: בעלזא בית המדרש הגדול
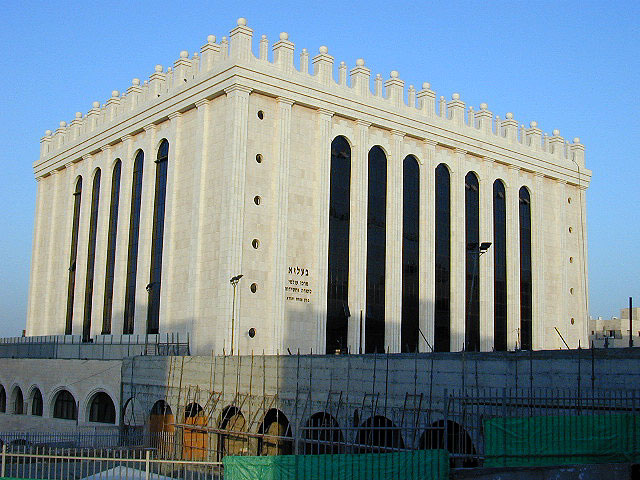
- The synagogue in 2005

- Location of the synagogue in Jerusalem

Religion
- Affiliation: Hasidic Judaism
- Rite: A blend of Nusach Sefard and Nusach Ashkenaz
- Ecclesiastical or organisational status: Synagogue
- Leadership: Rabbi Yissachar Dov Rokeach
- Year consecrated: 2000
- Status: Active

Location
- Location: 7 Binat Yisas'har Street, Kiryat Belz, Jerusalem
- Country: Israel
- Coordinates: 31°47′49.64″N 35°12′27.39″E

Architecture
- Architect: Aaron Ostreicher
- Type: Synagogue architecture
- Style: Modernist architecture
- Groundbreaking: 1980s
- Completed: 2002

Specifications
- Direction of façade: East
- Capacity: Approx. 10,000
- Dome: One
- Dome height (outer): 23 m (75 ft)

Website
- worldofbelz.org/tour-the-shul/

The Belz Great Synagogue (Hebrew: בעלזא בית המדרש הגדול, romanized: Belz Beis HaMedrash HaGadol) is a Hasidic Jewish congregation and synagogue, located at 7 Binat Yisas'har Street, in the Kiryat Belz neighborhood of Jerusalem, Israel. Designed by Aaron Ostreicher and completed in 2002, the synagogue was built by the Belz Hasidic community with financial help from its supporters around the world. With capacity for approximately 10,000 worshipers, the synagogue is one of the largest synagogues in Israel.

== Planning and construction ==
In the 1980s, Rabbi Yissachar Dov Rokeach, the fifth Belzer Rebbe, spearheaded plans for the huge synagogue to be erected in the Kiryat Belz neighborhood of Jerusalem. The building, designed with four entrances accessible to each of the four streets of the hilltop neighborhood, would be an enlarged replica of the structure that the first Belzer Rebbe, the Sar Shalom, built in the town of Belz in 1843. It would include a grandiose main sanctuary, smaller study halls, wedding and bar mitzvah halls, libraries, and other communal facilities.

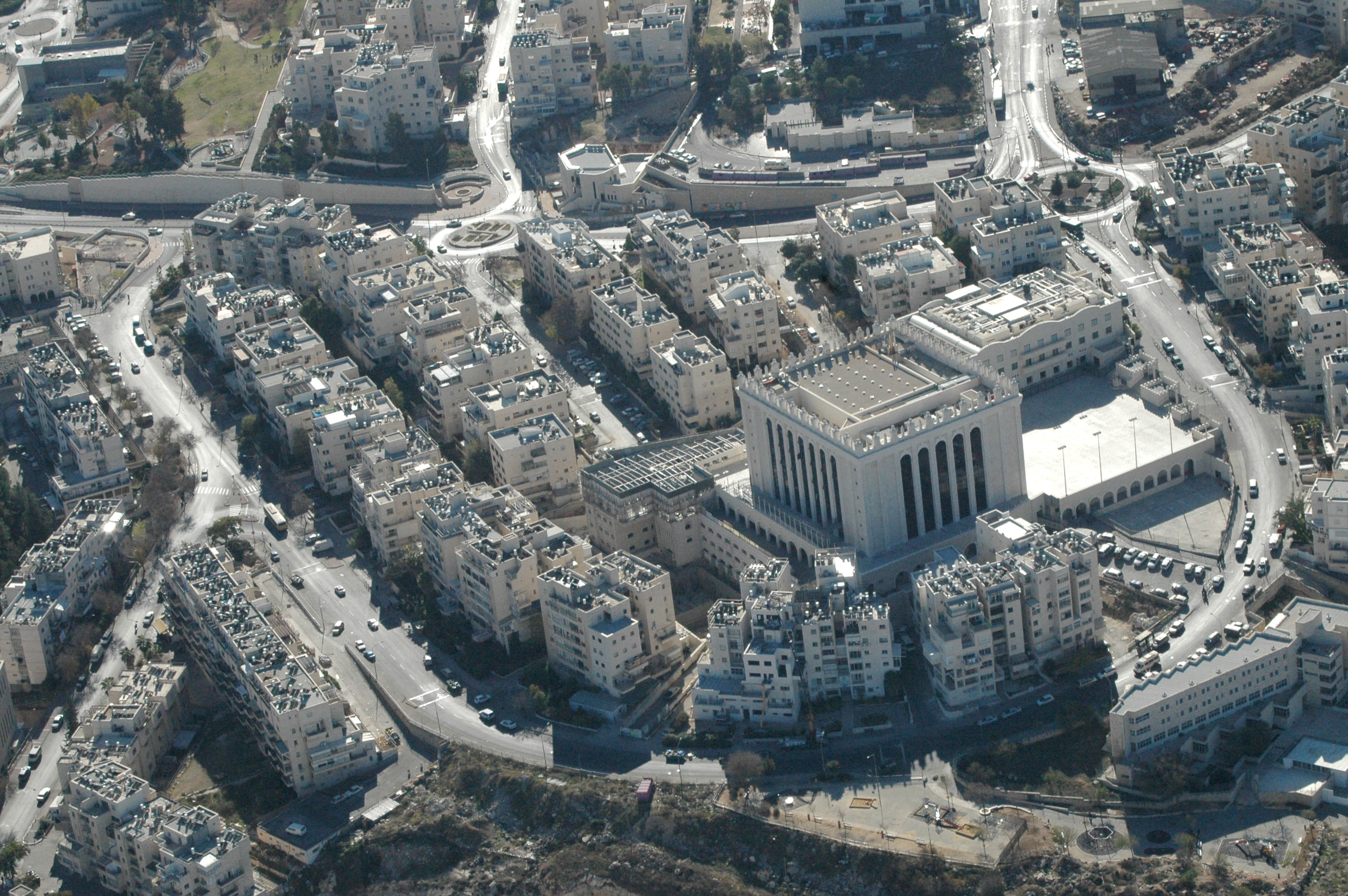
Aerial view of the synagogue

Funds for the ambitious, multimillion-dollar project were raised among Belzer Hasidim and were supplemented by various fundraising projects throughout the 1980s and 1990s. Like the original synagogue, which took 15 years to complete, the new Belz synagogue that now dominates the northern Jerusalem skyline also took 15 years to construct. It was dedicated in 2000.

The ornate wooden ark is 12 metres (39 ft) high and weighs 16 t (18 short tons). It has the capacity to hold 70 Torah scrolls. Nine chandeliers, each standing at 5.5 metres (18 ft) high and 3.4 metres (11 ft) wide, contain over 200,000 pieces of Czech crystal apiece.

In stark contrast to the majestic synagogue, the simple wooden chair and shtender used by Rabbi Aharon Rokeach when he came to Israel in 1944 stand in a glass case next to the ark.

== Architecture ==
The main sanctuary, that seats 2,589 worshippers, is used only on Shabbat and Jewish holidays, while weekday services take place in the underlying smaller rooms of the complex. Under the main sanctuary are multiple floors. The floor directly under the main sanctuary hosts a large number of small synagogue rooms known as shtieblach, where services for Shacharit, Mincha and Maariv are held up to every 10 minutes. In an adjacent wing is also a large hall used for tishen. Below the shtieblach are multiple floors with dormitory-style sleeping quarters for Belzer Hasidim from outside of Israel, who come to be with the Rebbe for Jewish holidays such as Rosh HaShana, Yom Kippur and Sukkot. There are also large rooms for other functions, such as Seudah shlishit on Shabbat afternoons, weddings and bar mitzvah celebrations.

A separate two-story house for the Belzer Rebbe stands adjacent to the synagogue. Here the Rebbe maintains his office and receives guests, as well as resides with his family. The second-floor balcony of the house faces the large, outdoor courtyard of the synagogue, where Hasidim gather for outdoor addresses by the Rebbe and for large celebrations under a giant tent, such as the bar mitzvah banquets for the Rebbe's grandsons in 2008 and 2010.

== Gallery ==
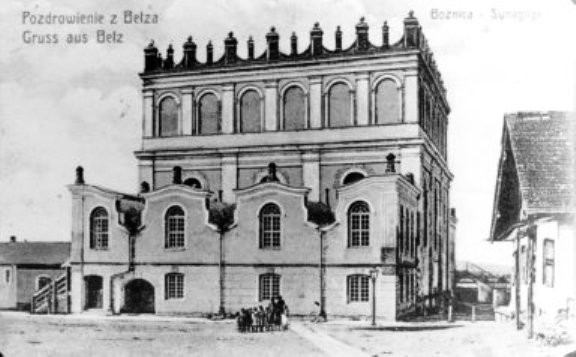
The original synagogue in Belz, dedicated in 1843 and destroyed during World War II.

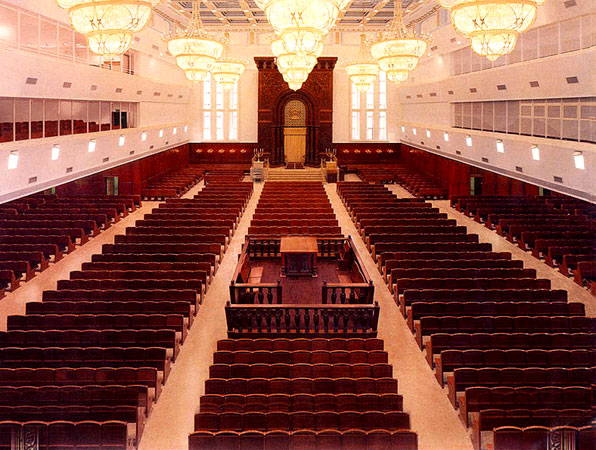
The large interior of the synagogue can accommodate 2,589 worshippers on the main level. A similar number fit in the men's and women's galeries above.

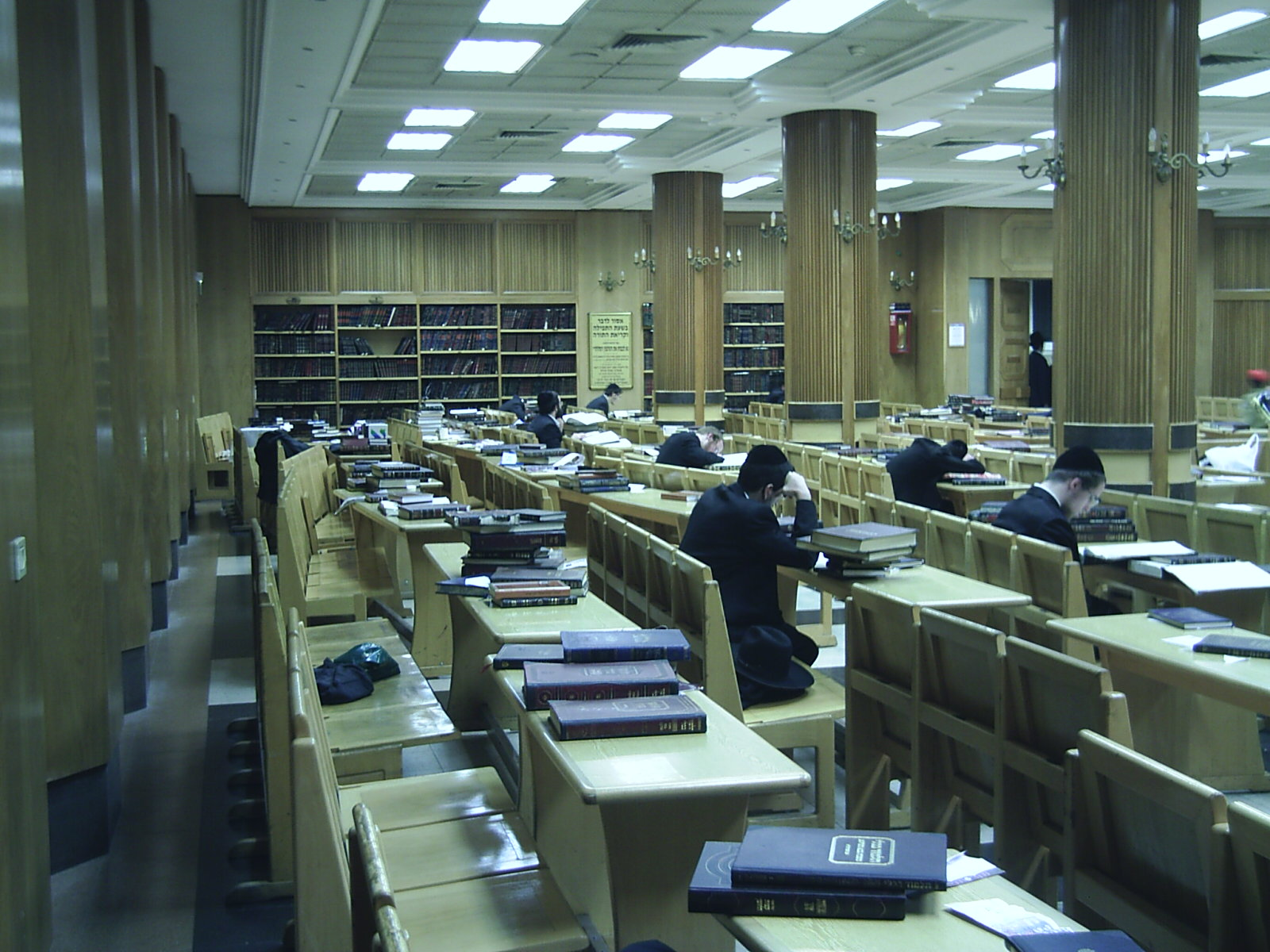
Men learning in the beis medrash in the lower level of the building.

== See also ==
- History of the Jews in Israel
- List of synagogues in Israel
- Synagogues of Jerusalem
