= Yehoshua Rokeach =

Polish rabbi

Rabbi Yehoshua Rokeach
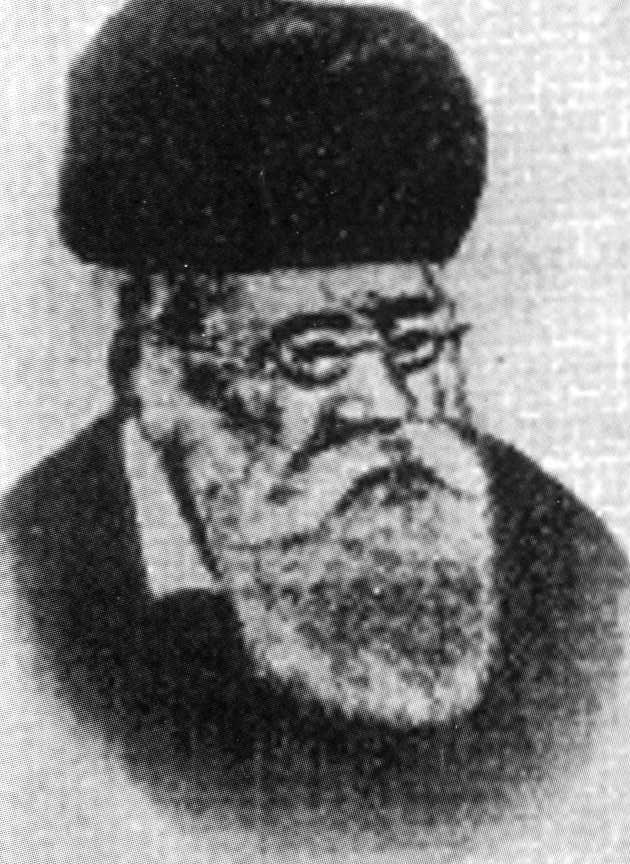
- Title: Second Belzer Rebbe

Personal life
- Born: Yehoshua Rokeach; 1825
- Died: February 3, 1894 (23 Shevat 5654) on a train from Vienna to Belz
- Buried: Belz
- Spouse: Rivka Miriam
- Children: Yissachar Dov Rokeach and at least four others
- Parent: Sholom Rokeach (father)
- Dynasty: Belz

Religious life
- Religion: Judaism

Jewish leader
- Predecessor: Sholom Rokeach
- Successor: Yissachar Dov Rokeach
- Began: 1856
- Ended: 1894
- Main work: Ohel Yehoshua
- Dynasty: Belz

Rabbi Yehoshua Rokeach (1825 – February 3, 1894), known as the Mitteler Ruv, was the second rebbe of the Hasidic dynasty of Belz. He opposed the Haskalah ("Enlightenment") movement that was making inroads in Jewish communities in Poland during the nineteenth century, and founded the Machzikei Hadas organization.

== Family ==
Rabbi Yehoshua Rokeach was the youngest of five sons of Rabbi Sholom Rokeach (the Sar Shalom), founder of the Belz dynasty. His eldest brother was named Elazar. His father was his primary teacher.

Yehoshua married a granddaughter of the Apter Rov and had five sons and four daughters.

== Leadership ==
The notion of a son succeeding a father as Rebbe was uncommon at that point in the development of the Hasidic movement; usually the Rebbe was succeeded by a close disciple. He was the rebbe from 1857 to 1894.

Rokeach battled the Haskalah movement that sought to introduce modernity and compromise in the Torah community. He often defended the Torah way of life to the leaders of the Haskalah's Shomer Yisrael organization.

To strengthen Torah Jewry against the inroads of Haskalah, the Rebbe helped found the Machzikei Hadas organization in 1878 and the Machazikei Hadas newspaper, both of which still exist in the Belzer community.

== Death ==
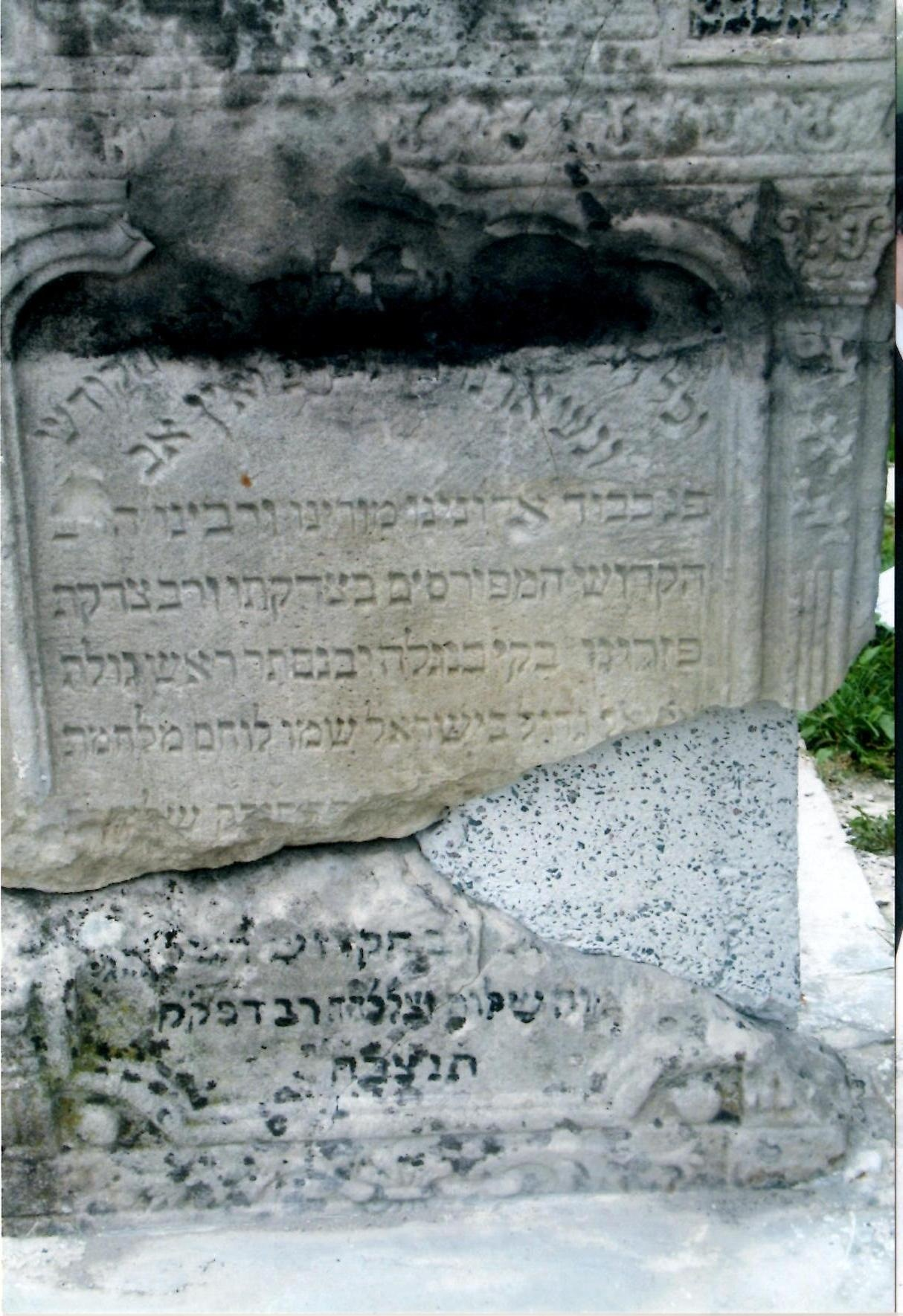
His tombstone in Belz

In 1894 Rokeach traveled to Vienna for an operation and died on the train returning to Belz, at the age of 69.

He was succeeded as rebbe by his second son, Yissachar Dov Rokeach.

== See also ==
- Belz Beis HaMedrash HaGadol
