= Yissachar Dov Rokeach (third Belzer rebbe) =

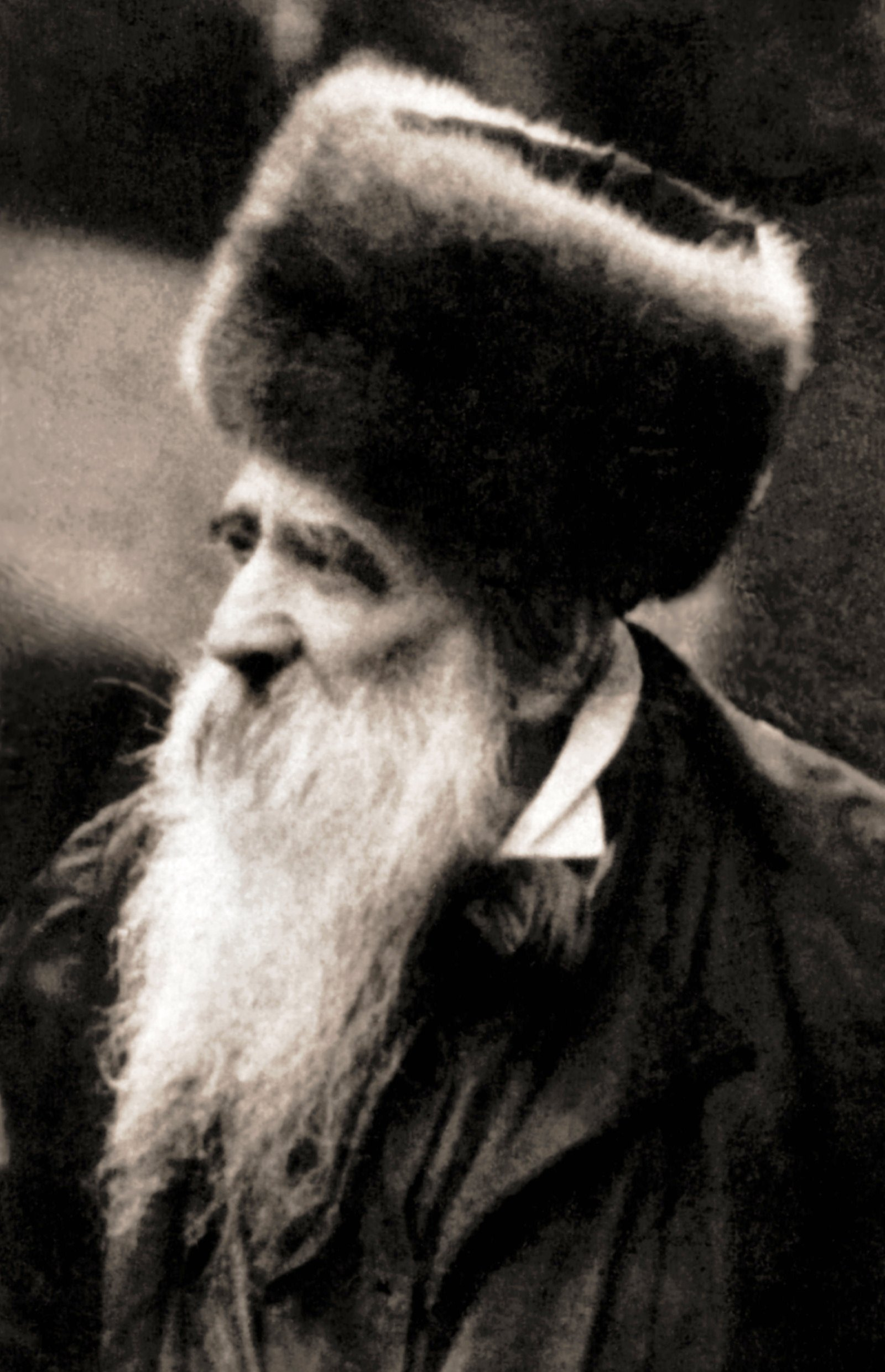
- Rabbi Yissachar Dov Rokeach of Belz
- Title: Third Belzer Rebbe

Personal life
- Born: Yissachar Dov Rokeach; 1851 Belz, Austrian Galicia
- Died: 29 October 1926 (22 Cheshvan 5687) Belz, Second Polish Republic
- Buried: Belz
- Spouse: Basha Ruchama, Chaya Devorah Pytshnik
- Children: Aharon Rokeach; Chana Rochel (m. Pinchos Twerski of Ustila), Sheva (m. Yitzchok Nochum Twerski of Shpykiv); Henya; Yehoshua of Yeroslav; Sara (m. Yochanan of Hrubieszów); Mordechai of Bilgoray; Yente (m. Yochonon Twerski); Sholom
- Parents: Yehoshua Rokeach (father); Rivka Miryam Ashkenazi (mother)

Religious life
- Religion: Judaism

Jewish leader
- Predecessor: Yehoshua Rokeach
- Successor: Aharon Rokeach
- Began: 1894
- Ended: 1926
- Main work: Mahari"d

Yissachar Dov Rokeach (1851 – 29 October 1926) was the third Rebbe of the Belz Hasidic dynasty. He was the second son of Rabbi Yehoshua Rokeach (the second Rebbe of Belz), and served as the third Belzer Rebbe from his father's death in 1894 until his own death in 1926.

== Personal life ==
Yissachar Dov was born in the town of Belz, Galicia. His grandfather, Rabbi Sholom Rokeach, the founder of the Belz dynasty, named him after his own father-in-law, Rabbi Yissachar Dov Ramraz, the av beit din of Sokal.

Yissachar Dov married Basha Ruchama, the daughter of Rabbi Yeshaya Zushe Twersky of Chernobyl and granddaughter of Rabbi Aaron Twersky of Chernobyl. They had two children: Aharon Rokeach, who would assume the mantle of leadership of the Belz Hasidim after his father's death, and Chana Rochel, who married Pinchos Twerski of Ustila.

After his first wife died, Yissachar Dov remarried Chaya Devora, daughter of Rabbi Avrohom Shmuel Pytshnik of Berezna. Together they had six children, including Mordechai Rokeach, who would later be known as Mordechai of Bilgoray and would accompany his half-brother Aharon as they, alone of all their family, escaped from Nazi-controlled Eastern Europe and arrived in Mandatory Palestine in February 1944.

== Rabbinical career ==
Following his father's death in 1894, Yissachar Dov acceded to the positions of Rav of the town of Belz and spiritual leader of the Belzer Hasidim. He also stood at the helm of the Machzikei Hadas movement set up by his father.

He was an acknowledged leader of Galician Jewry and was renowned as a miracle worker, attracting thousands who sought his blessing. He created the yoshvim program in Belz which encouraged married and unmarried men to spend all day learning Torah in local shtieblach. These scholars were supported by local businessmen.

Rabbi Yissachar Dov strongly opposed Zionism, which he saw as a threat to Jewish continuity.

== World War I ==
During World War I, the Russian army invaded and destroyed the town of Belz, which was under Austrian control. Rabbi Yissachar Dov fled to Hungary with many of his Hasidim. After the war, he lived for approximately two years in Oleszyce, in the home of a chassid named Yisrael Vogel. He returned to Belz to re-establish his court on Tuesday, 2 Shevat 5684 (January 8, 1924), at which time the town was under Polish rule.

He died on Friday night, 29 October 1926 (22 Cheshvan 5687), and was buried next to his father in the Belz Jewish cemetery.

== Rebbes of Belz ==
1. Rabbi Sholom Rokeach (1779–1855)
2. Rabbi Yehoshua Rokeach (1825–1894)
3. Rabbi Yissachar Dov Rokeach (1854–October, 1926)
4. Rabbi Aharon Rokeach (1880–1957)
5. Rabbi Yissachar Dov Rokeach (b. January, 1948)
