= Makova (Hasidic dynasty) =

Hasidic dynasty originating from Makó, Hungary

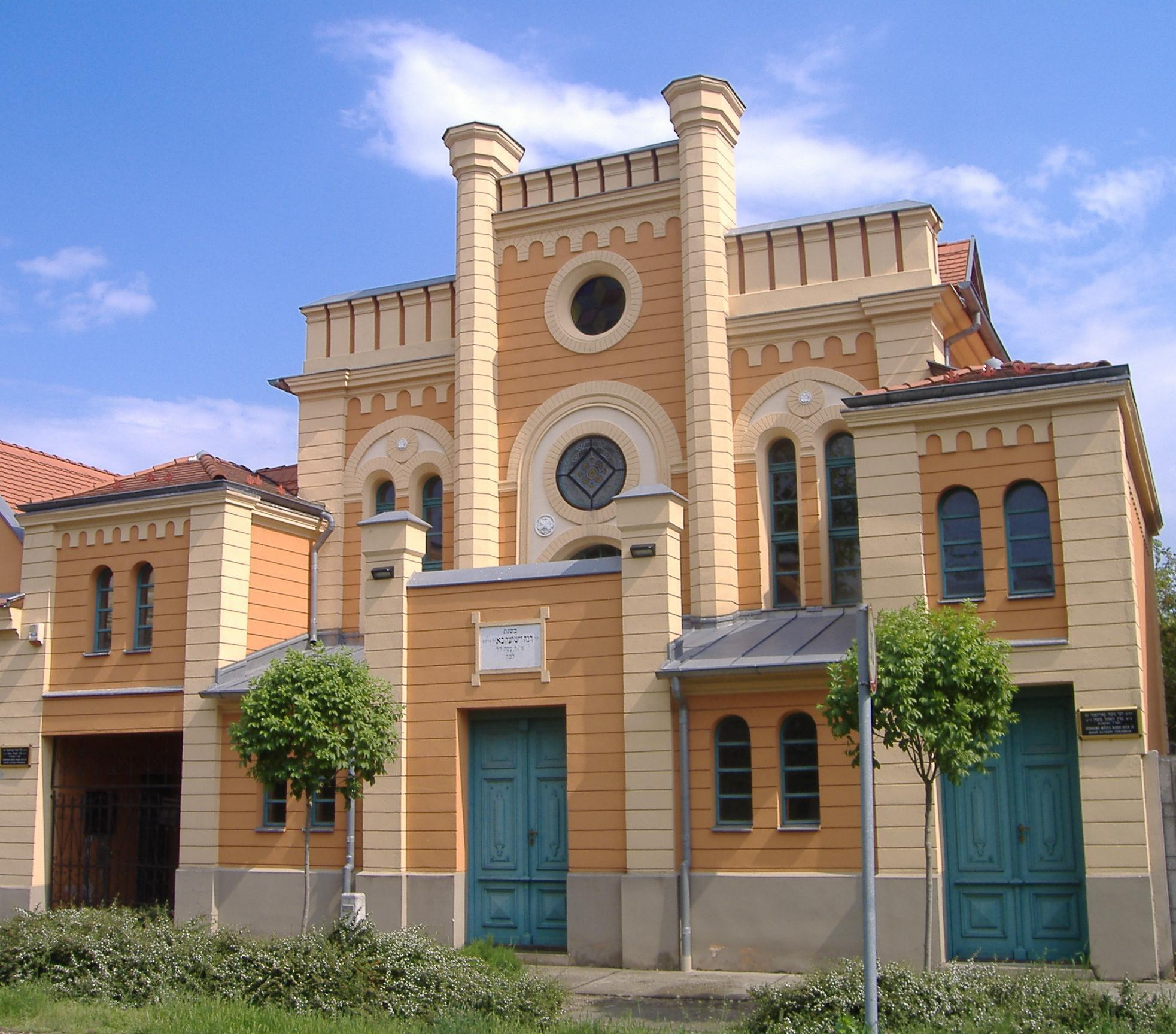
Makó Synagogue

Makova (Yiddish: מאקאווא) is a Hasidic dynasty originating in the city of Makó, Hungary, where it was founded by Rabbi Moshe Vorhand (1862–1944). It is based in Kiryat Ata, Israel.
