= Bernstein =

Bernstein is a common surname of German origin, meaning "amber" (literally "burn stone"). The name is used by both Germans and Jews, although it is most common among people of Ashkenazi Jewish heritage. The German pronunciation is [ˈbɛʁnʃtaɪn], but in English, it is pronounced either as /ˈbɜːrnstaɪn/ or /ˈbɜːrnstiːn/.

== Notable people sharing the surname "Bernstein" ==
=== A–H ===
- Aaron Bernstein (1812–1884), German short story writer and historian
- Abe Bernstein (1892–1968), American mobster
- Abraham Bernstein (disambiguation), several people
- Adam Bernstein (born 1960), American film, music video, television director, and screenwriter
- Al Bernstein (born 1949), Austrian contemporary artist
- Al Bernstein (born 1950), American boxing commentator
- Alan Bernstein (born 1947), Canadian medical researcher
- Alexander Bernstein, Baron Bernstein of Craigweil (1936–2010), British television executive and politician and psychologist, doctor of medicine, professor
- Alfred Bernstein (1911–2003), American civil rights and union activist
- Andrew Bernstein (disambiguation), several people
- Armyan Bernstein, American film producer, director and screenwriter
- Arnold Bernstein (1888–1971), German-American shipowner and pioneer of transatlantic car transport
- Artie Bernstein (1909–1964), American jazz bassist
- Aryeh Leib Bernstein (1708–1788), Chief Rabbi of Galicia
- Assaf Bernstein (born 1970), Israeli director and screenwriter.
- Axel Bernstein (1974–2017), German politician
- Basil Bernstein (1924–2000), British sociologist and linguist
- Benjamin Abram Bernstein (1881–1964), American mathematician
- Bernard Bernstein, multiple people
  - Bernard Bernstein (1908–1990), American economist and public official
  - Bernard Bernstein (1928–2021), American metalsmith
  - Bernard Bernstein (1899–1963), English table tennis player
- Bonnie Bernstein (born 1970), American sports broadcaster
- Byron Bernstein (1989–2020), known as Reckful, Israeli-American Twitch streamer and former professional Esports player
- Carl Bernstein (born 1944), American investigative journalist, Watergate reporter
- Charles Bernstein (composer) (born 1943), film and television music composer
- Charles Bernstein (poet) (born 1950), American poet, father of Felix Bernstein
- Daniel Bernstein, video game and movie composer, and CEO of Sandlot Games
- Daniel J. Bernstein (born 1971), American mathematics professor, creator of qmail and djbdns, and plaintiff in Bernstein v. United States
- David Bernstein (architect) (1937–2018), American-born architect
- David Bernstein (executive) (born 1943), English football and business executive
- David E. Bernstein (born 1967), American law professor, writer, libertarian
- David I. Bernstein, Rabbi at Pardes Institute of Jewish Studies, Jerusalem and New York City
- Drew Bernstein (1963–2014), American fashion designer
- Eduard Bernstein (1850–1932), German Social Democrat
- Elmer Bernstein (1922–2004), American composer and conductor
- Elsa Bernstein (1866–1949), Austrian-German writer and dramatist of Jewish descent
- Evan Bernstein (wrestler) (born 1960), Israeli Olympic wrestler
- Felix Bernstein (mathematician) (1878–1956), German mathematician
- F. W. Bernstein (1938–2018), German poet, cartoonist, satirist and academic
- Georg Heinrich Bernstein (1787–1860), German orientalist
- Hans Bernstein (1903–1977), German-American conductor and orchestrator
- Harry Bernstein (1910–2011), British-born American author
- Heinrich Agathon Bernstein (1828–1865), German naturalist, zoologist and explorer
- Henri Bernstein (also Henry-Léon-Gustave-Charles Bernstein, 1876–1953), French playwright
- Henry Bernstein (sociologist) (1912–1964), social realist artist, WPA muralist
- Herman Bernstein (1876–1935), Jewish American journalist and writer
- Hilda Bernstein (1915–2006), South African author, artist, activist against apartheid and for women's rights
- Howard Bernstein (1953–2024), British chief executive of Manchester City Council

=== I–N ===
- Ignatius Bernstein (1846–1900), Russian railroad engineer
- Ira B. Bernstein (1924–2024), American physicist, specializing in theoretical plasma physics
- Isadore Bernstein (1876–1944), American screenwriter
- J. Sidney Bernstein (1877–1943), Russian-American lawyer, politician, and judge
- Jack Bernstein (1899–1945), American boxer
- Jacob Bernstein-Kohan (1859–1929), Russian doctor and Zionist
- Jake Bernstein, American Pulitzer Prize-winning investigative journalist and author
- Jake Bernstein (born 1946), American financial writer
- Jared Bernstein (born 1955), American economist
- Jed Bernstein (born 1955), American executive in the performing arts
- Jeremy Bernstein (1929–2025), American theoretical physicist and science writer
- Joe Bernstein (boxer) (1877–1931), one of the first great boxers to emerge from New York's Lower East Side
- Joe Bernstein (American football) (1893–1967), professional football player
- Joe Bernstein (poker player) (1899–1975), poker player and road gambler
- Joseph Bernstein (born 1945), Israeli mathematician
- Joseph Milton Bernstein (1908–1975), alleged spy
- Josh Bernstein (born 1971), American explorer, author, and television personality
- Julius Bernstein (1839–1917), German neurobiologist
- Léna Bernstein (1906–1932), German aviator
- Leonard Bernstein (1918–1990), American composer, conductor, pianist, author, and teacher
- Lionel Bernstein (1920–2002), South African anti-apartheid activist and political prisoner
- Ludwig B. Bernstein (1870–1944), Latvian-American sociologist and social worker
- Matt Bernstein (born 1982), American football player
- Matt Bernstein (born 1998), American makeup artist and internet celebrity
- Max Bernstein (1854–1925), German art and theatre critic and author
- Melanie Bernstein (born 1976), German politician
- Michèle Bernstein (born 1932), French writer
- Mikhail Bernshtein (1875–1960), Soviet painter and art educator
- Miriam Bernstein-Cohen (1895–1991), Israeli actress, director, poet and translator
- Morris Louis Bernstein (1912–1962), American abstract expressionist painter
- Nikolai Bernstein (1896–1966), Russian neurophysiologist

=== O–Z ===
- Ossip Bernstein (1882–1962), Russian chess master
- Peretz Bernstein (1890–1971), Zionist activist and Israeli politician
- Peter Bernstein (composer) (born 1951), American film and television composer
- Peter Bernstein (guitarist) (born 1967), American jazz guitarist
- Peter L. Bernstein (1919–2009), American financial author, economist and educator
- Phil Bernstein, American computer scientist
- Rhett Bernstein (born 1987), American soccer player
- Richard Bernstein (journalist) (1944–2025), American columnist for The New York Times
- Richard B. Bernstein (1956–2023), American constitutional historian and CCNY lecturer in law and political science
- Richard Barry Bernstein (1923–1990), American chemist
- Richard H. Bernstein (born 1974), American lawyer and Michigan Supreme Court justice; first blind Supreme Court justice in the United States
- Richard J. Bernstein (1932–2022), American philosopher
- Richard K. Bernstein (1934–2025), American physician
- Richard Bernstein (artist) (1939–2002), American artist, illustrated covers of Interview magazine
- Richard Bernstein (bass) (born 1966), American opera singer at the Metropolitan Opera
- Robert Bernstein (comics) (1919–1988), American comic book writer
- Robert A. Bernstein (born 1961), American attorney and politician
- Bob Bernstein (born 1939), American businessman
- Robert L. Bernstein (1923–2019), American publisher and human rights activist
- Robert Root-Bernstein (born 1953), American professor of life sciences
- Ronni Reis-Bernstein (born 1966), American tennis player
- Rosalie Bernstein (1831–1907), British businesswoman and fashion merchant
- Roxy Bernstein (born 1972), American sportscaster
- Salomon Bernstein (1886–1968), Israeli painter
- Samuil Bernstein (1911–1997), Soviet linguist
- Sarah Bernstein (musician) (born 1985), American jazz and improvisation musician
- Sergei Natanovich Bernstein (1880–1968), Soviet mathematician
- Seymour Bernstein (1927–2026), American pianist, composer, and teacher
- Sid Bernstein (editor) (1907–1993), Advertising Age co-founder, Crain publications chairman, Ad Age writer/editor
- Sid Bernstein (impresario) (1918–2013), brought the Beatles and the Rolling Stones to America, organized rock concerts
- Sidney Bernstein (disambiguation)
- Steven Bernstein (cinematographer) (active from 1986), American cinematographer
- Steven Bernstein (musician) (born 1961), American trumpeter
- Steven "Jesse" Bernstein (1950–1991), American poet
- Theodore Menline Bernstein (1904–1979), American journalist, New York Times editor
- Theresa Bernstein (1890–2002), American artist and painter
- Walter Bernstein (1919–2021), American film producer and screenwriter
- William J. Bernstein (born 1948), American financial theorist
- Zalman Bernstein (1926–1999), American billionaire businessman and philanthropist

== From non-English Wikipedias ==
- Alexander Nikolaevich Bernstein (1870–1922), Russian and Soviet psychiatrist, psychotherapist
- Alvin Bernstein (1927–2011), Romanian Jewish writer, journalist, literary critic and theatre editor
- Andreas Christian Bernstein (1672–1699), German hymn writer
- Anna Matveevna Bernstein-Kogan (1868–?), French and Russian surgeon and medical scientist
- Benjamin Yehuda Leib Bernstein (1839–1905), the first Rosh Yeshiva of Yeshivat Chayei Olam in Jerusalem.
- Boris Moiseevich Bernstein (1924–2015), Estonian Soviet art historian, doctor of art history
- Caroline Bernstein (1797–1838), German writer
- Charlotte Drews-Bernstein (1936–2022), German screenwriter, director, audio book producer and radio writer
- Costa Bernstein (born 1973), Russian-Israeli painter and sculptor
- Deborah Bernstein (born 1944), Israeli professor emeritus, sociologist and social historian
- Drake Bernstein (born 1989), American tennis player
- Emil Bolden-Bernstein (1909–1993), educator, professor, editor and activist
- Enrique Bernstein Carabantes (1910–1990), Chilean diplomat
- F. O. Bernstein (1929–1999), German photographer
- Faina Abramovna Kogan-Bernstein (1899–1976), Soviet istorik- medievalist, translator from Old French and modern French language
- Frank Bernstein (born 1964), German ancient historian
- Friedrich Bernstein (1818–1886), German military and administrative officials
- Friedrich Ferdinand Wilhelm von Schäffer-Bernstein (1790–1861), Grand Ducal Hessian General of the Infantry and Minister of War
- Georg Heinrich von Bernstein (?–1670), Domdechant Magdeburg and canon to Naumburg
- Gerda Meyer-Bernstein (1924–2024), American Contemporary artist
- Gregory Bernstein (born 1955), American screenwriter
- Hanan Bernstein (born 1955), officer in the IDF in the reserves with the rank of brigadier general
- Hans von Bernstein (1525–1589), Electoral Saxon Privy Council
- Herbert Bernstein (1930–2001), German lawyer and university professor
- Ignaz Bernstein (1836–1909), Russian-Jewish folklorist and linguist
- Inna Abramovna Bernstein (1919–1992), Soviet and Russian literary critic
- Inna Maksimovna Bernstein (1929–2012), Soviet and Russian translator
- Jenny Schaffer-Bernstein (1888–1943), Austrian actress
- Johann Georg von Schäffer-Bernstein (1757–1838), Hesse-Darmstadt Lieutenant General
- Johann Gottlob Bernstein (1747–1835), German physician and professor of medicine
- Karl Ilich Bernstein (1842–1894), Russian lawyer, professor of law
- Leonid Bernstein (1921–2019), commander of a partisan battalion
- Lev Matveevich Kogan-Bernstein (1862–1889), Russian revolutionary, narodolets
- Lev Semenovich Sinaev-Bernstein (1867–1944), French sculptor
- Luca Bernstein (1873–1931), Romanian Jew poet, playwright and editor
- Marcos Bernstein (born 1970), Brazilian screenwriter and film director
- Mark Lvovich Bernstein (1919–1989), leading materials scientists of the USSR
- Matvey Lvovich Kogan-Bernstein (1886–1918), Russian revolutionary, political figure, Ph.D.
- Mikhail Alexandrovich Bernstein (1911–1984), Soviet oil geologist, teacher
- Mikhail Davidovich Bernstein (literary critic) (1911–2002), Soviet literary critic
- Mira Bernstein (1908–1943), Jewish teacher and communist
- Mordechai Bernstein (publisher) (1893–1983), Israeli writer, playwright, publisher and public figure
- Mordechai Bernstein (pioneer) (1862–1934), one of the founders of Rosh Pina
- Moshe Bernstein (rabbi) (1892–1956), rabbi and Revisionist public activist
- Natalia Osipovna Kogan-Bernstein (1861–1927), Russian revolutionary and political activist.
- Natan Osipovich Bernstein (1836–1891), Russian doctor, physiologist
- Naum Samuilovich Bernstein (1922–1997), Moldovan Soviet translator and journalist
- Nikolay Davidovich Bernstein (1876–1938), Russian musicologist, music critic and historian
- Paul Bernstein (cryptologist) (1891–1976), German engineer and cryptologist
- Paul Bernstein (political scientist) (1897–1944 or 1945), German political scientist, journalist and community college teacher
- Polina Samoilovna Bernstein (1870–1949), Soviet translator
- Reiner Bernstein (1939–2021), German historian and publicist
- Rohl Bernstein (1869–1942), Jewish poet, novelist and playwright
- Rudolf Bernstein (1896–1977), German comintern and film official
- Sergei Alexandrowitsch Bernstein (1901–1958), Russian civil engineer
- Sergey Ignatievich Bernstein (1892–1970), Russian (Soviet) linguist, bibliographer, historian of the theatre, one of the founders of OPOZAZ
- Sergey Vladimirovich Bernstein-Kogan (1886–1951), Russian and Soviet economist, economic geographer
- Shimon Bernstein (1884–1962), literary researcher, writer, editor and Zionist
- Shlomo Bernstein (1907–1969), Israeli architect
- Thomas Bernstein (artist) (born 1957), German visual artist and art teacher
- Vladimir Bernstein (1900–1936), Russian-born Italian mathematician
- Walter Bernstein (artist) (1901–1981), German artist

== Fictional people ==
- Rugal Bernstein, a major villain in the King of Fighters video game series
- Adelheid Bernstein, the son of Rugal, making a debut appearance in King of Fighters 2003
- Mr. Bernstein, the business partner of Charles Foster Kane in the 1941 film Citizen Kane
- Judith Bernstein, pseudonym of the character Janine Butcher in the British soap opera EastEnders
- Kudelia Aina Bernstein, a character in the mecha anime series Mobile Suit Gundam: Iron-Blooded Orphans

== Places ==
- Château du Bernstein, a castle in Alsace, France
- Bernstein im Burgenland, a village near the Austrian-Hungarian border
- Pełczyce, a town in the Polish West Pomeranian Voivodeship (part of Germany until 1945), known in German as Bernstein
- Bernstein (Northern Black Forest), a mountain in Baden-Württemberg, Germany

== See also ==
- Justice Bernstein (disambiguation)
- Berenstein, a variant
- Bernstine
- Albert Baernstein II (1941–2014), American mathematician
- Dan Bern (born 1965), American musician who previously performed under the name Bernstein
- Eric Berne (1910–1970, born Bernstein), American psychiatrist and writer
- Burstyn (disambiguation), a Polish and Ukrainian version of the same word
