= Sid Bernstein =

Sid Bernstein may refer to:

- Sid Bernstein (editor) (1907–1993), executive committee chairman of Crain Publications and editor of Advertising Age
- Sid Bernstein (impresario) (1918–2013), American music promoter, talent manager, and author

== See also ==
- Sid Bernstein Presents, a 2010 documentary film
- Sidney Bernstein (disambiguation)
