= Robert Bernstein =

Robert Bernstein may refer to:

- Robert Bernstein (comics) (1919–1988), American comic book writer
- Robert A. Bernstein (born 1961), American attorney and politician
- Bob Bernstein (born 1939), American businessman
- Robert L. Bernstein (1923–2019), American publisher and human rights activist
- Robert Root-Bernstein (born 1953), American professor of life sciences

== See also ==
- Bernstein
