= Burnstine =

Burnstine is a surname. Notable people with the surname include:

- David Burnstine (1900–1965), American bridge player
- Ken Burnstine (died 1976), American drug smuggler
- Susan Burnstine (born 1966), American photographer and journalist

== See also ==
- Bernstine
