= Heinrich Agathon Bernstein =

German naturalist, zoologist and explorer (1828–1865)

Heinrich Agathon Bernstein (22 September 1828 – 19 April 1865) was a German naturalist, zoologist and explorer from Breslau (Wrocław).

== Biography ==
=== Early years ===
Heinrich Agathon Bernstein was born on 22 September 1828 in Breslau (modern-day Wrocław, Lower Silesia, Poland), and died on 19 April 1865 at Batanta (Raja Ampat Islands, Southwest Papua, Indonesia). His father, Professor Georg Heinrich Bernstein, taught theology and oriental languages at Breslau University. By 1840 Heinrich had started at the Gymnasium in Wrocław (Maria-Magdalena), but after two years he departed with his parents and a teacher for a year-long in Italy. When returned to Wrocław he studied for three and a half years at the Saksian state school at Pforta, and proceeded to St. Elisabeth’s Gymnasium in Breslau and finish his education in 1849. In October 1849 he began studying medicine at the University at Wrocław, and became a doctor there on 16 November 1853 with his thesis De anatomia corvorum pars prima osteologia. Johann Ludwig Christian Carl Gravenhorst, whom he met at the university, was largely responsible for drawing out Bernstein’s interest in natural history. From 1852 Bernstein travelled extensively, visiting Poland, Austria, Hungary and France. Then in early 1854 he departed to the Netherlands, and never returned to Germany again.

=== Time in the Netherlands and departure to Indonesia ===
Arriving in the Netherlands, Bernstein visited the large natural history collections at Leiden. Here he met Coenraad Jacob Temminck (director of the museum at Leiden), and soon enough he was ready to fulfil his dream to go to the tropics. To get to Indonesia he volunteered for the Dutch Army as medical specialist, and gained his passage as the ship’s doctor, departing on 18 June 1854. But his contract bound him to return soon afterwards. Once back in Leiden he took the exam for physician (16 April 1855), and in doing so gained some exclusive rights to work in the overseas possessions of the Netherlands.

=== Time in Indonesia before his expeditions ===
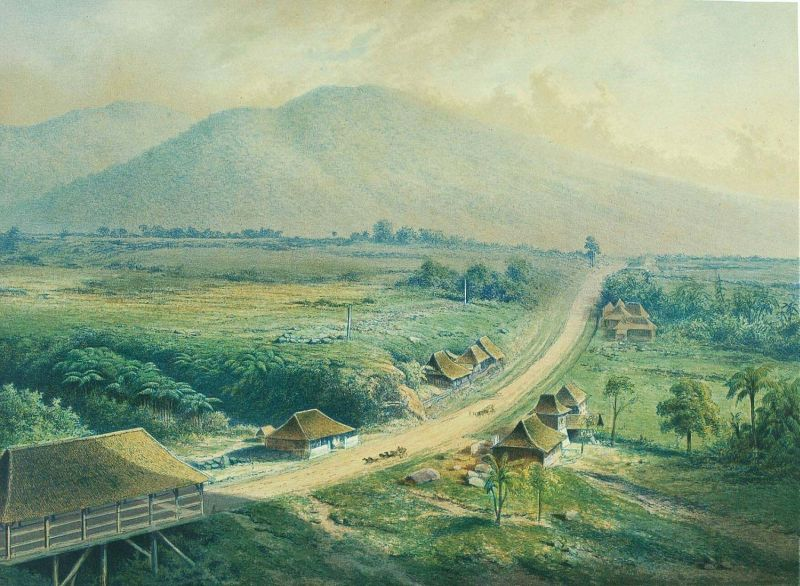
A hospital in Gadok. Litho L.H. W. M. de Stuers 1865-1876

On 10 September 1855 Bernstein arrived again in Java. Here he immediately became the first physician of the Health Establishment at Gadok near Buitenzorg (Bogor), and remained in post until 31 October 1860. Directly after arriving in Indonesia, Bernstein began collecting (either alone or with local guides) and on 8 October 1856 the first consignment of skins arrived at Leiden (some 300 birds). Bernstein also started publishing articles in Journal für Ornithologie. His articles there between 1859–1861 on the nests and eggs of Javanese birds so impressed Hermann Schlegel, director of the museum at Leiden, that he invited Bernstein to work for the museum to collect zoological items. Bernstein was duly appointed in March 1859 as official collector for the Dutch government, and in this new role he began to collect a wide range of both flora (now in the herbaria of Wrocław) and fauna. In November 1860 he got permission from the Governor-Generals Charles Ferdinand Pahud and his successor Ludolph Anne Jan Wilt Sloet van de Beele; they granted him to travel to New Guinea. He was the first researcher in this region after the departure from Franz Wilhelm Junghuhn and the death of Carl Anton Ludwig Maria Schwaner in 1851. On 7 November Bernstein departed for the Moluccas, arriving a month later at Ternate (Halmahera), where he collected birds for eight days and set up “home”.

=== Bernstein’s various expeditions in Indonesia ===
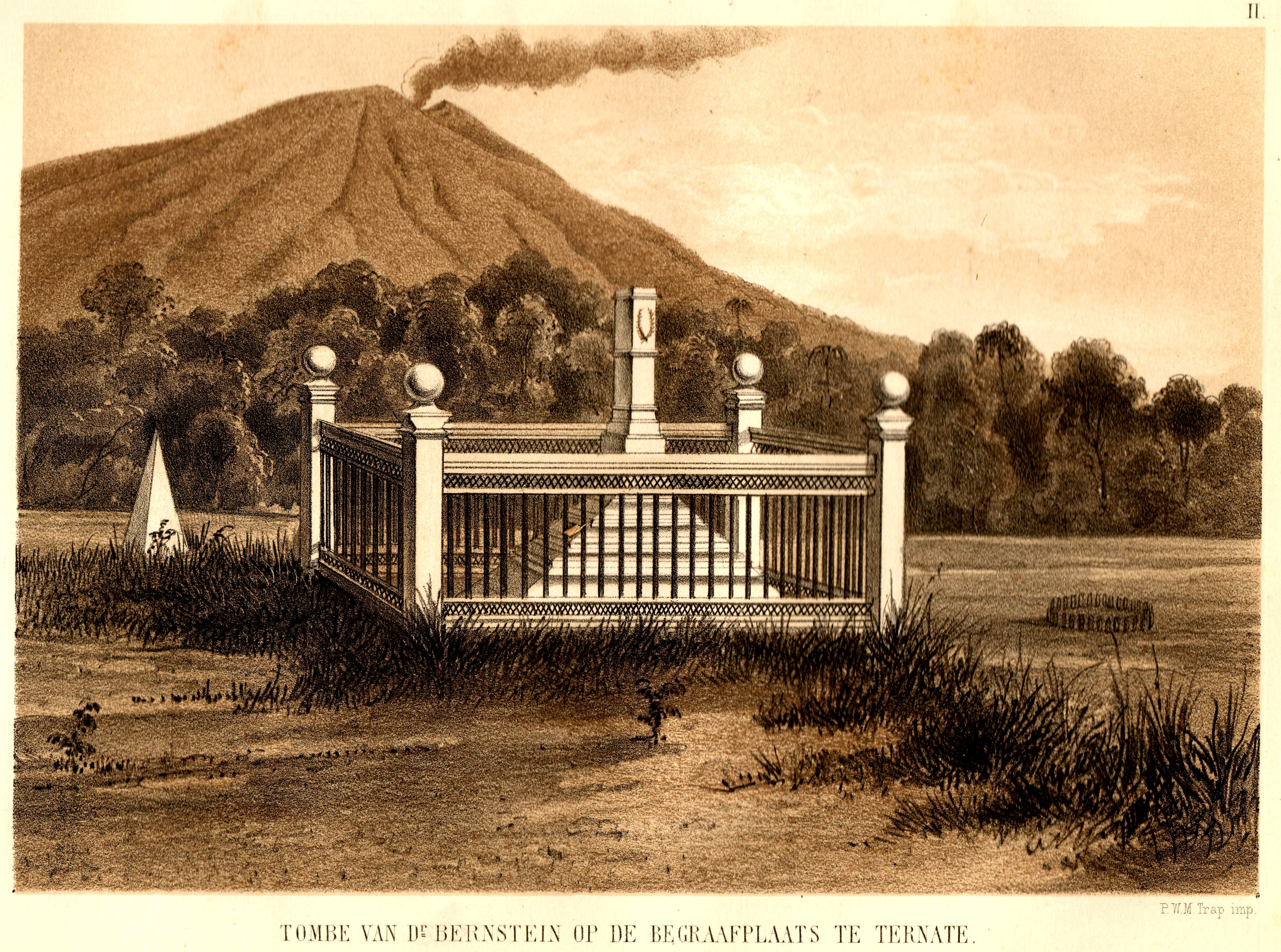
Bernstein's grave in the cemetery of Ternate.

Analysing the specimens present within the museum at Leiden, Bernstein made no less than nine separate trips from Ternate. Ternate was used as a base for rebuilding boats, writing letters (mostly to Hermann Schlegel) and sending specimens to Leiden. Schlegel was always urging Bernstein to keep ahead of Alfred Russel Wallace, who was also collecting at that time in the area. The rivalry was strong but gentlemanly. On 6 February 1861 Wallace wrote in a letter from Dili (Timor): The Dutch have just sent out a collector for the Leyden Museum to the Moluccas. He is now at Ternate, and goes to spend two years in Gilolo and Batchian, and then to N. Guinea. He will, of course (having four hunters constantly employed, and not being obliged to make his collecting pay expenses), do much more than I have been able to do; but I think I have got the cream of it all. His name is Bernstein; he has resided long in Java, as doctor at a Sanatorium, and tells me he has already sent large collections to Leyden, including the nests and eggs of more than a hundred species of birds! Are these yet arranged and exhibited? They must form a most interesting collection. He indicates in this letter that he had met Bernstein, and in a later one he confirmed this. At various times Bernstein is mentioned in Wallace’s Malay Archipelago (for example in the chapter on Gilolo—now Halmahera—in Volume II and in chapter 38 about the birds of paradise).

Trip 1: 22 December 1860–end March 1861

Trip 2: 25 June 1861 – 10 October 1861

Trip 3: October 1861–February 1862

Trip 4: 1–26 April 1862

Trip 5: mid-July–26 September 1862

Trip 6: 7 November 1862 – 18 July 1863

Trip 7: September–November 1863

Trip 8: January 1864–end April 1864

Trip 9: 18 October 1864 – 19 April 1865

Bernstein died on Batanta at 19 April 1865 of a liver abscess, and was buried on Ternate.

== Birds named for Heinrich Bernstein ==
- Chinese crested tern Sterna bernsteini (Schlegel 1863)
- Scarlet-breasted fruit-dove Ptilinopus bernsteinii bernsteinii (Schlegel 1863)
- Black-billed coucal Centropus bernsteini bernsteini (Schlegel 1866)
- Sula scrubfowl Megapodius bernsteinii (Schlegel 1866)
- Red-bellied pitta Pitta erythrogaster bernsteini (Junge 1958)
- Bernstein's red lory Eos bornea bernsteini (Rosenberg 1863)
- Bernstein's black lory Chalcopsitta atra bernsteini (Rosenberg 1861)

Bernstein is also commemorated in the lowland ringtail possum Pseudochirulus canescens bernsteini and with an insect, the red lacewing Cethosia cydippe bernsteini.

== Birds named by Bernstein ==
- Long-billed honeyeater Melilestes megarhynchus vagans (Bernstein 1864)
- Paradise crow Lycocorax pyrrhopterus obiensis (Bernstein 1864)
- Brown-headed crow Corvus fuscicapillus megarhynchus (Bernstein 1864)
