= Senator Bernstein =

Senator Bernstein may refer to:

- Abraham Bernstein (politician) (1918–1990), New York State Senate
- Robert A. Bernstein (born 1961), Massachusetts State Senate
