= Burshtin (Hasidic dynasty) =

Ukrainian Hasidic dynasty

Grand Rabbi David Eichenshtein of Burshtin

Burshtin is a Hasidic dynasty headed by Grand Rabbi David Eichenstein, the Burshteiner Rebbe. The main Burshteiner synagogue is located in Borough Park, Brooklyn.

The group originated in Burshtyn, now located in Ukraine, but was once part of Austria-Hungary. The Grand Rebbe is a scion of many great rabbinical dynasties, including Zidichov and Stretin. He has authored several books of Hasidic lore. He is a disciple of Grand Rabbi Joel Teitelbaum of Satmar. His brother, Grand Rabbi Isaac Menachem Eichenstein, is the Galanter Rebbe of Williamsburg, Brooklyn. His son, Rabbi Zeideleh has, in recent years, been functioning as a "Rebbe in Waiting" offering auxiliary and complementing Rebbe services alongside the Grand Rebbe. The second son, Rabbi Luzer, leads the local chapter in the Williamsburg section of Brooklyn.

== Name ==
The name 'Burshtin' is derived from Polish-Yiddish (bursztyn) or Ukrainian (Бурштин) for amber (German and Yiddish: Bernstein, Börnsteen „Brennstein“, lit. "burn[ing]stone"; lat. electrum or glaesum, ἤλεκτρον ēlektron).

== Burshtin dynasty ==
- Grand Rabbi Yitzchok Eichenstein of Ziditchov (1740-1800)
  - Grand Rabbi Yissochor Berish Eichenstein of Ziditchov (d. 1832), son of Rabbi Yitzchok
    - Grand Rabbi Yitzchok Eichenstein of Ziditchov (1805-1873), son of Rabbi Yissochor
      - Grand Rabbi Shlomo Yaakov Eichenstein of Ziditchov (d. 1886), son of Rabbi Yitzchok
      - Grand Rabbi Nochum of Burshtin
      - Grand Rabbi Eliezer of Burshtin
        - Grand Rabbi Yitzchok Menachem Eichenstein of Burshtin-Podheitz (1879-1943), son of Rabbi Shlomo Yaakov, son-in-law of Rabbi Nochum
          - Grand Rabbi Shlomo Yaakov Zeide Eichenstein of Burshtin (1899-1963), son of Rabbi Yitzchok
            - Grand Rabbi Yitzchok Menachem Eichenshtein, current Galanter Rebbe, son of Rabbi Shlomo Yaakov
            - Grand Rabbi Dovid Eichenstein, current Burshtiner Rebbe, son of Rabbi Shlomo Yaakov

== Recent activities ==
The new Burshtin headquarters is built in its full glory and is located at 12th Ave and 56th Street in Brooklyn, New York. Burshtin opened a new synagogue in the Williamsburg section of Brooklyn serving the followers of Burshtin living in Williamsburg.

== See also ==
- History of the Jews in Poland
- History of the Jews in Galicia (Eastern Europe)
- History of the Jews in Ukraine
