= Burstyn =

Burstyn, Burshtyn, Burshtin, Birshtyn, or Bursztyn are derived from Polish (bursztyn) or Ukrainian (Бурштин) for amber. It corresponds to German and Yiddish surname Bernstein. It may refer to:

== People ==
- Burshtin (Hasidic dynasty)
- Dina Bursztyn (born 1948), Argentine sculptor
- Ellen Burstyn, American actress, host of The Ellen Burstyn Show
- Feliza Bursztyn, Colombian sculptor
- Gunther Burstyn (1879-1945), Austrian inventor and officer of the Austro-Hungarian Army
- Igal Bursztyn, Israeli film director, writer, producer
- Joseph Burstyn (1899–1953), Polish-American film distributor
- Mike Burstyn (born 1945), American actor
- Thomas Burstyn (born 1954), Canadian cinematographer

== Places ==
- Burshtyn, Ukraine
  - Burshtyn TES

== See also ==
- Joseph Burstyn, Inc. v. Wilson, (also referred to as the Miracle Decision), a landmark decision by the United States Supreme Court which largely marked the decline of motion picture censorship in the United States
