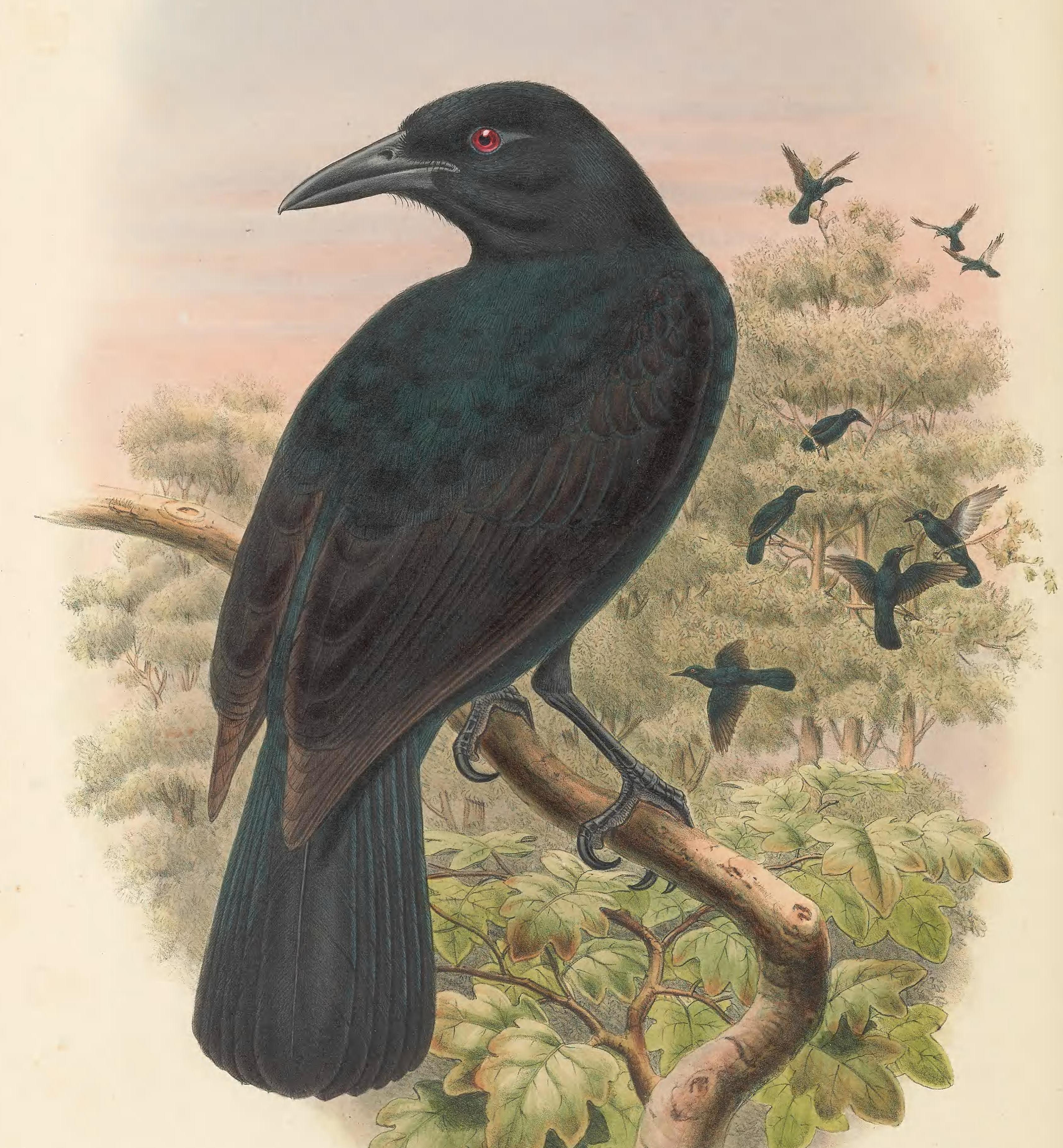
- Illustration by William Matthew Hart
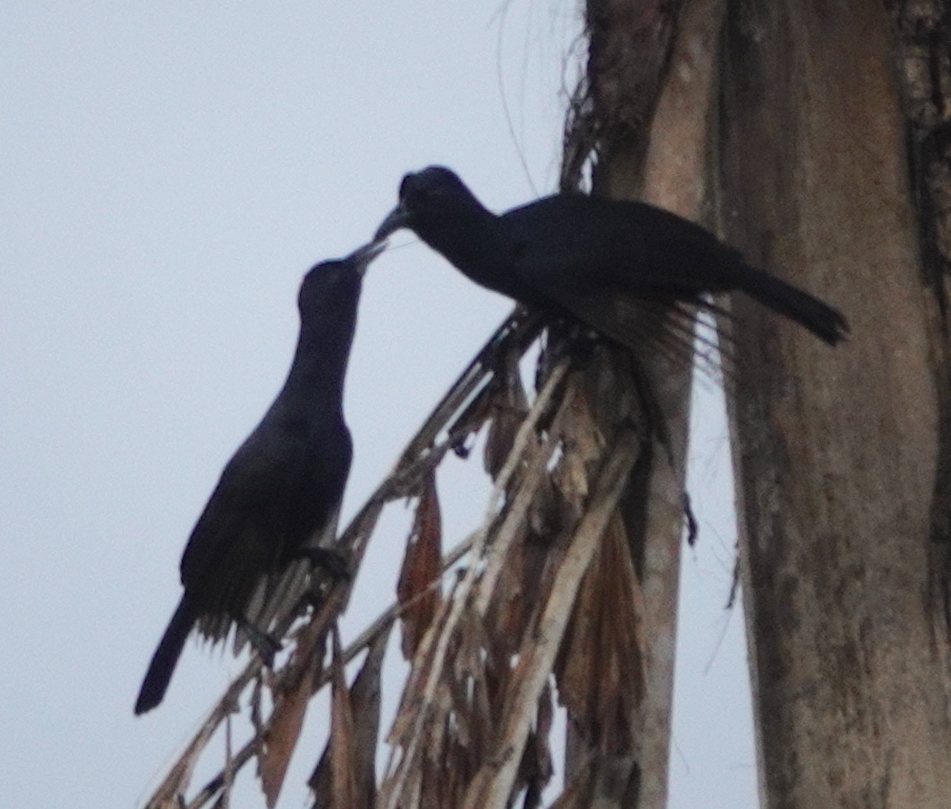

Conservation status
- Least Concern (IUCN 3.1)

Scientific classification
- Kingdom: Animalia
- Phylum: Chordata
- Class: Aves
- Order: Passeriformes
- Family: Paradisaeidae
- Genus: Lycocorax
- Species: L. obiensis

Binomial name
- Lycocorax obiensis Bernstein, 1865

= Obi paradise-crow =

Species of bird

The Obi paradise-crow (Lycocorax obiensis) is a species of paradise-crow in the family Paradiseaidae along with the birds-of-paradise. This bird was split from its congener, the Halmahera paradise-crow (L. pyrrhopterus) in 2016. The species was first described and named by Heinrich Agathon Bernstein in 1865.

== Etymology ==
The Obi paradise-crow's scientific name is Lycocorax obiensis, consisting of Lycocorax, meaning "jackdaw-crow", which refers to its overall crow-like appearance of a jackdaw, and obiensis which refers to the Obi Islands where the birds are found.

== Description ==
Obi paradise-crows are blackish overall, with a bluish-green sheen/iridescence to the feathers. The flight feathers are a light brownish, and the tail feathers have a pronounced bluish sheen to them. They have a crow-like head and bill; the bill is a cool light gray. Also, they have distinctive and beautiful, scarlet-red eyes and blackish to grayish legs and feet with sharp claws adapted for their perching lifestyles.

The calls of this bird sounds reminiscent of a trumpet-like hwoot hwoot, followed by a click click. The calls of the Obi paradise-crow is one of the most recognizable sounds in its range.

== Behavior and ecology ==
The biology of this bird has not been studied in full detail. Their diets consist predominantly of fruits, supplemented by the occasional invertebrate. The birds typically feed solitarily, but also in pairs, small groups and even in association with other bird species, like imperial pigeons.

Its breeding period is not defined, but nests and eggs have been recorded from December to June. The nest is a cup-like shape consisting of moss, leaves, vines, and wood chips. Clutch is one egg. Incubation and chick rearing details unknown.

== Habitat and distribution ==
The Obi paradise-crow is found on Obi and Bisa islands in the Obi group, south of Halmahera, the home of its congener. They are found in tropical forest and forest edge at 1,200 m (3,940 ft) in altitude on Obi island.
