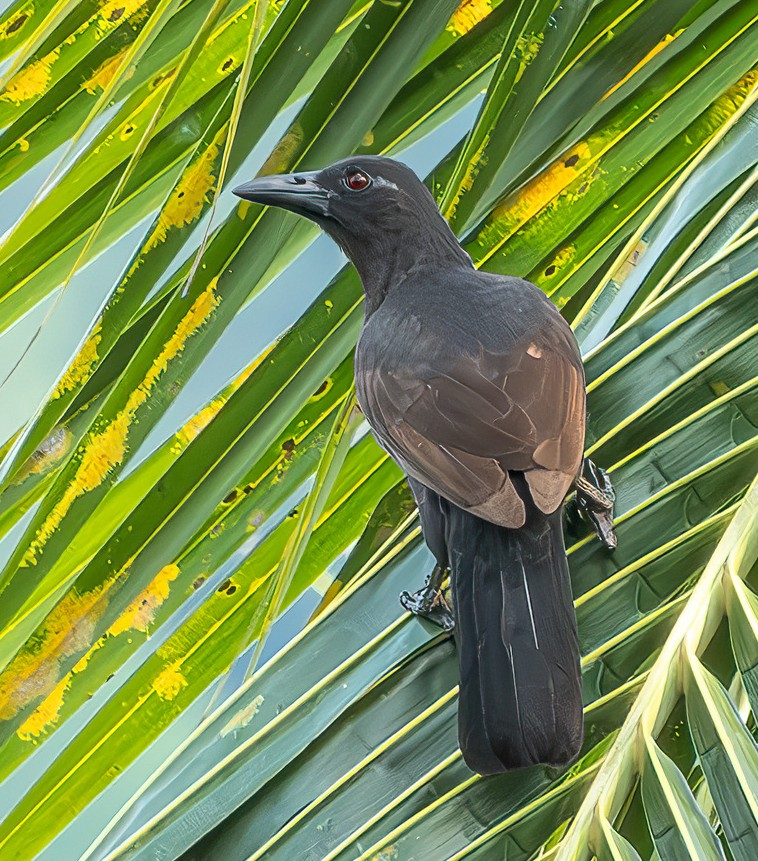

Conservation status
- Least Concern (IUCN 3.1)

Scientific classification
- Kingdom: Animalia
- Phylum: Chordata
- Class: Aves
- Order: Passeriformes
- Family: Paradisaeidae
- Genus: Lycocorax
- Species: L. pyrrhopterus

Binomial name
- Lycocorax pyrrhopterus (Bonaparte, 1850)

= Halmahera paradise-crow =

Species of bird

The Halmahera paradise-crow (Lycocorax pyrrhopterus) also known as the silky crow, is a medium-sized crow-like bird-of-paradise.

One of the few monogamous birds-of-paradise, this paradise-crow is endemic to lowland forests of Northern Maluku in Indonesia. The diet consists mainly of fruits and arthropods. It is a restricted-range forest dweller from Halmahera and Morotai, in the northern Maluku of Indonesia.

A common species throughout its habitat range, the Halmahera paradise-crow is evaluated as being of least concern on the IUCN Red List of Threatened Species. It is listed on Appendix II of CITES.

== Description ==
The Halmahera paradise-crow is a medium-sized bird-of-paradise, reaching a body length of up to 42 cm, with a dark, soft and silky plumage that may appear all black, but is in fact a very dark brown. Both sexes are similar; the female is slightly smaller than the male. The nominate subspecies has the least or no white patch on the inner flight feathers.

The head is slightly glossy black-brown and the upper parts are lighter than the head. The upper plumage shines slightly, with a blue-gray shimmer that is most pronounced on the coat, with cinnamon-brown wings. It has a black bill, crimson eyes, and a call reminiscent of a dog's bark.

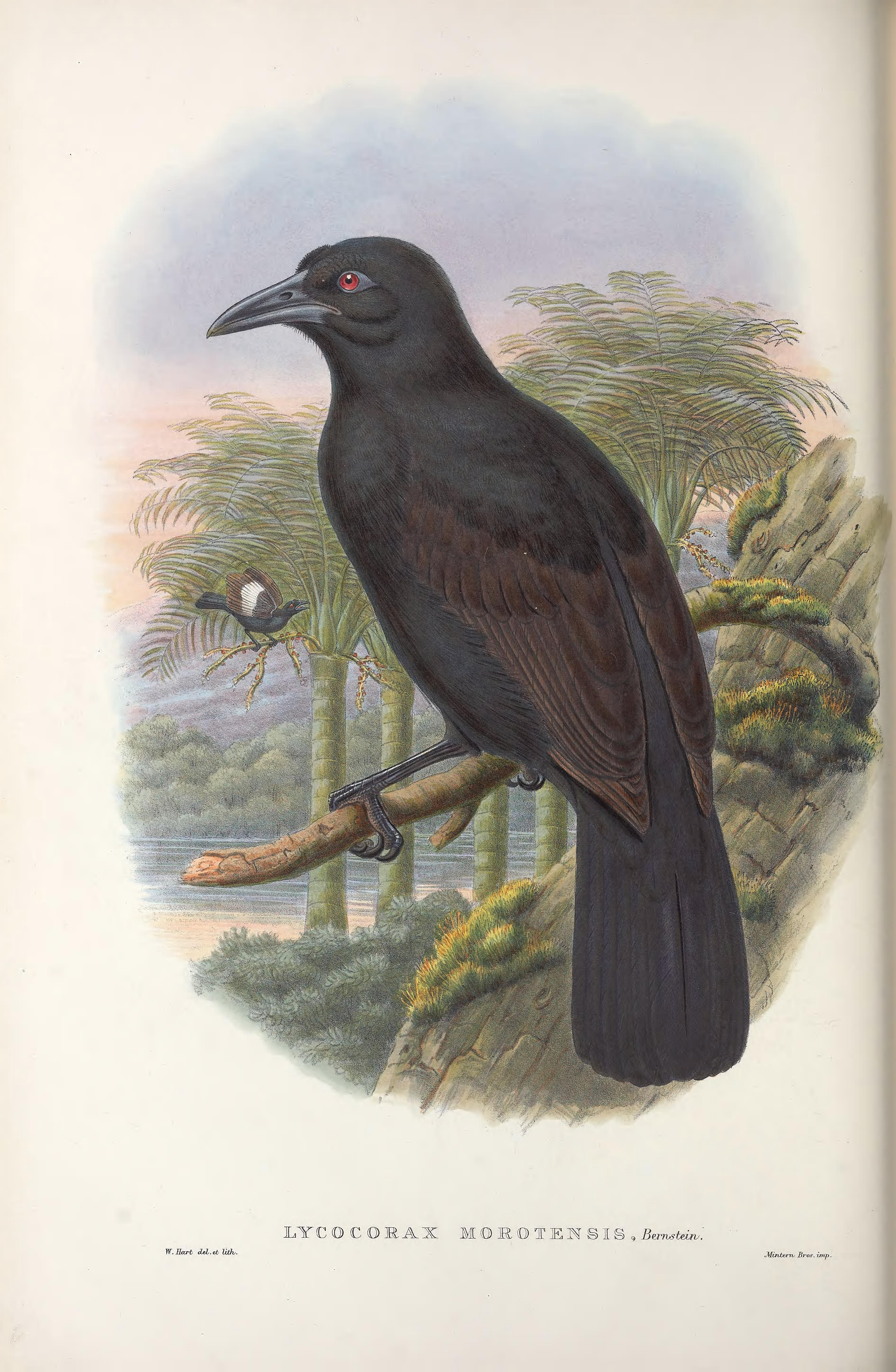
The subspecies Lycocorax pyrrhopterus morotensis by William Matthew Hart.

It was originally thought to be a crow (Corvidae), and was then reassigned to the birds of paradise, where it is the earliest known offshoot from the paradisaeid family tree, dating back approximately 17 million years in the Miocene period. Lycocorax is derived from the Greek lycos, a jackdaw, and korax, a raven. Pyrrhopterus means red-winged.

== Distribution and subspecies ==
The Halmahera paradise-crow occurs on the Northern Maluku islands of Halmahera, Bacan (Batjan), Kasiruta, Morotai and Rau. There are two subspecies, which occur in the following regions of Maluku.

Lycocorax pyrrhopterus pyrrhopterus — Halmahera, Kasiruta, and Bacan

Lycocorax pyrrhopterus morotensis — Morotai, and Rao Island

Previously, the Obi paradise-crow (Lycocorax obiensis) was treated as a subspecies of the Halmahera paradise-crow. However, due to its distinctiveness and potential for separation, it was split from L. pyrrhopterus in 2016, with the International Ornithological Congress also following through in 2021.

== Ecology and behaviour ==
The nominate form is a forest dweller, also found in gardens and forest edges. It prefers the taller trees of the forest interior and is not typically seen in the more open agricultural areas. Seldom found in swamp forest or mangroves, it sometimes occurs in Coconut plantations and orchards, and frequents the mid-level to lhe canopy of the vegetation. The diet of the paradise-crow is composed mainly by fruit, with some supplement from arthropods, both of which are foraged mainly from dense canopy and middle foliage.

The breeding season is approximately December to June, with eggs laid over the same period. As the sexes are similar, it is likely that the species is monogamous, but breeding behaviour is almost unknown. Halmahera nests are described as a large basin-shaped structure made of roots and moss and lined with soft chips of wood, and the clutch appears to consist of just a single egg.
