= Bernstine =

Bernstine is a surname. Notable people with the surname include:

- Aaron Bernstine (born 1984), American politician
- Jordan Bernstine (born 1989), American football player
- Quincy Tyler Bernstine, American actress and audiobook narrator
- Rod Bernstine (born 1965), American football player

== See also ==
- Bernstein
- Burnstine
