= Berenstein =

Berenstein is a surname. It is a variant of Bernstein.

People with this surname include:

- Daniel Emilfork-Berenstein (usually known as Daniel Emilfork), Chilean actor
- David Berenstein, American physicist
- Guno Berenstein, Dutch Olympic judoka

== See also ==
- Hill 400, Bergstein, the site of the former Berenstein Castle
- Berenstain, a variant often misspelled as Berenstein
