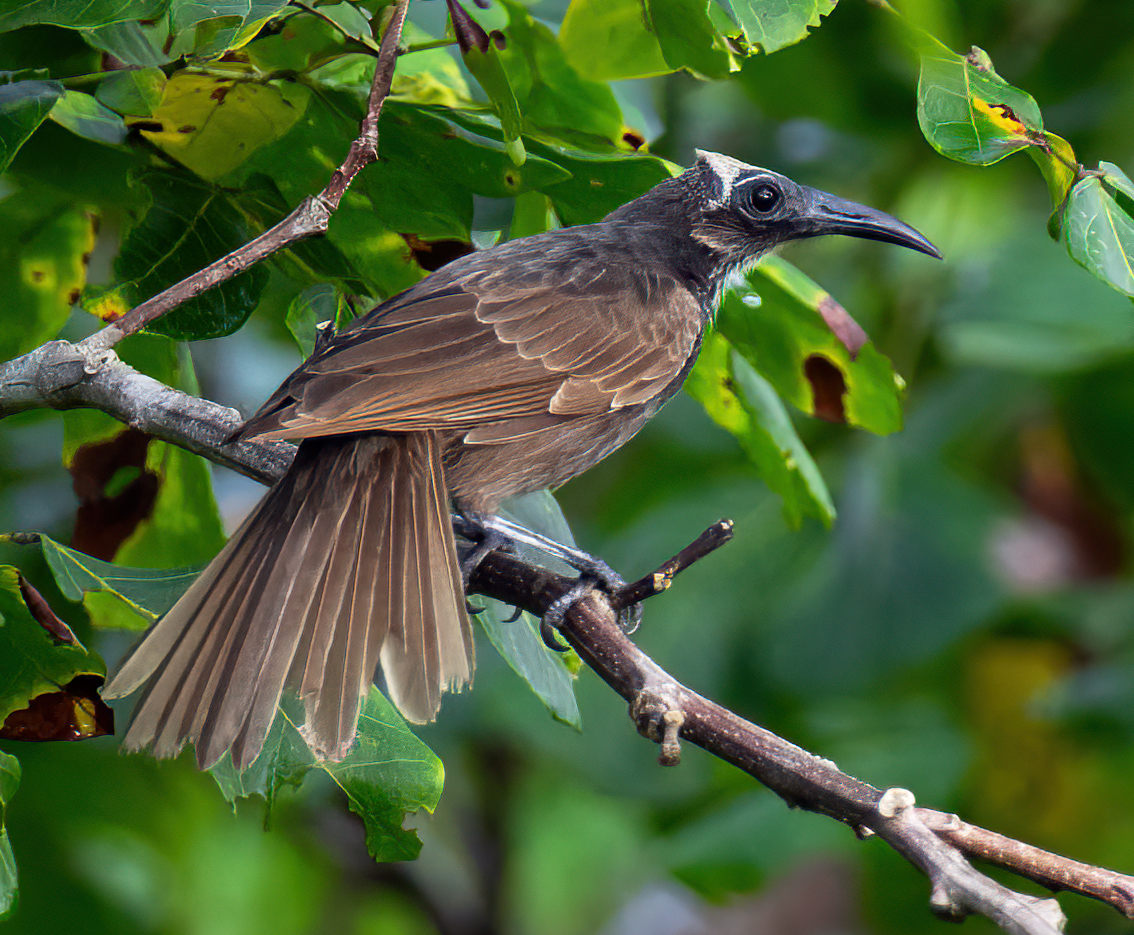

Conservation status
- Least Concern (IUCN 3.1)

Scientific classification
- Kingdom: Animalia
- Phylum: Chordata
- Class: Aves
- Order: Passeriformes
- Family: Meliphagidae
- Genus: Melitograis; Sundevall, 1872
- Species: M. gilolensis

Binomial name
- Melitograis gilolensis (Bonaparte, 1850)

= White-streaked friarbird =

Species of bird

The white-streaked friarbird (Melitograis gilolensis) is a species of bird in the family Meliphagidae. It is monotypic within the genus Melitograis. It is endemic to Northern Maluku in Indonesia. Its natural habitats are subtropical or tropical moist lowland forests, subtropical or tropical mangrove forests, and subtropical or tropical moist montane forests.
