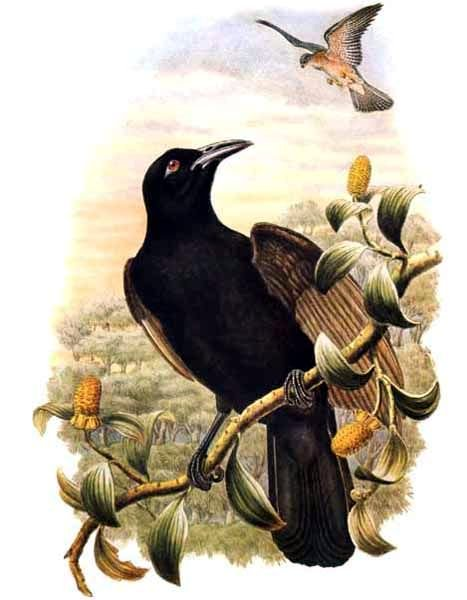
- Halmahera paradise-crow

Scientific classification
- Kingdom: Animalia
- Phylum: Chordata
- Class: Aves
- Order: Passeriformes
- Family: Paradisaeidae
- Genus: Lycocorax; Bonaparte, 1853

Type species
- Corvus pyrrhopterus Bonaparte, 1850

= Paradise-crow =

Genus of birds

Paradise-crows are members of the genus Lycocorax in the family Paradisaeidae (birds-of-paradise).

There are two species:

Image	Common name	Scientific name	Distribution
	Halmahera paradise-crow	Lycocorax pyrrhopterus	Northern Maluku islands of Halmahera, Bacan, Kasiruta, Morotai, and Rau, in Indonesia.
	Obi paradise-crow	Lycocorax obiensis	Obi Islands in Indonesia.
