= Sidney Bernstein =

Sidney Bernstein may refer to:

- Sid Bernstein (editor) (1907–1993), co-founder and editor of Advertising Age, Chairman of Crain Publications
- Sid Bernstein (impresario) (1918–2013), who brought the Beatles and the Rolling Stones to the United States, and organized rock concerts
- Sidney Bernstein, Baron Bernstein (1899–1993), British media baron
- Sidney Norman Bernstein (1911–1992), American chess master
- J. Sidney Bernstein (1877–1943), Russian-born Jewish-American lawyer, politician, and judge
