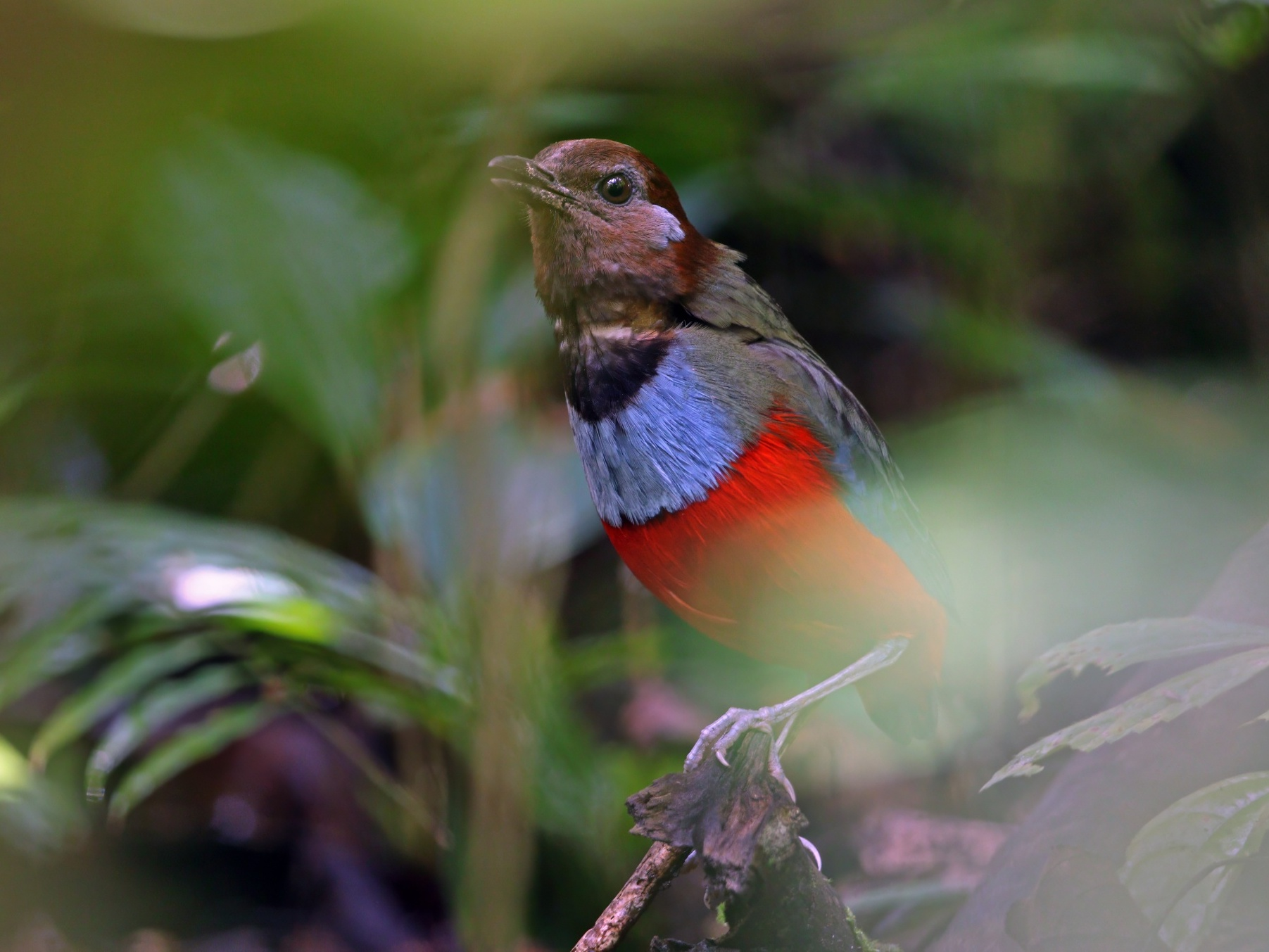

Conservation status
- Least Concern (IUCN 3.1)

Scientific classification
- Kingdom: Animalia
- Phylum: Chordata
- Class: Aves
- Order: Passeriformes
- Family: Pittidae
- Genus: Erythropitta
- Species: E. rubrinucha

Binomial name
- Erythropitta rubrinucha (Wallace, 1862)

Synonyms
- Erythropitta erythrogaster rubrinucha

= South Moluccan pitta =

Species of bird

The South Moluccan pitta (Erythropitta rubrinucha) is a species of pitta. It was formerly considered a subspecies of the red-bellied pitta. It is endemic to Indonesia where it occurs on Buru and Seram. Its natural habitat is subtropical or tropical moist lowland forests. It is threatened by habitat loss.
