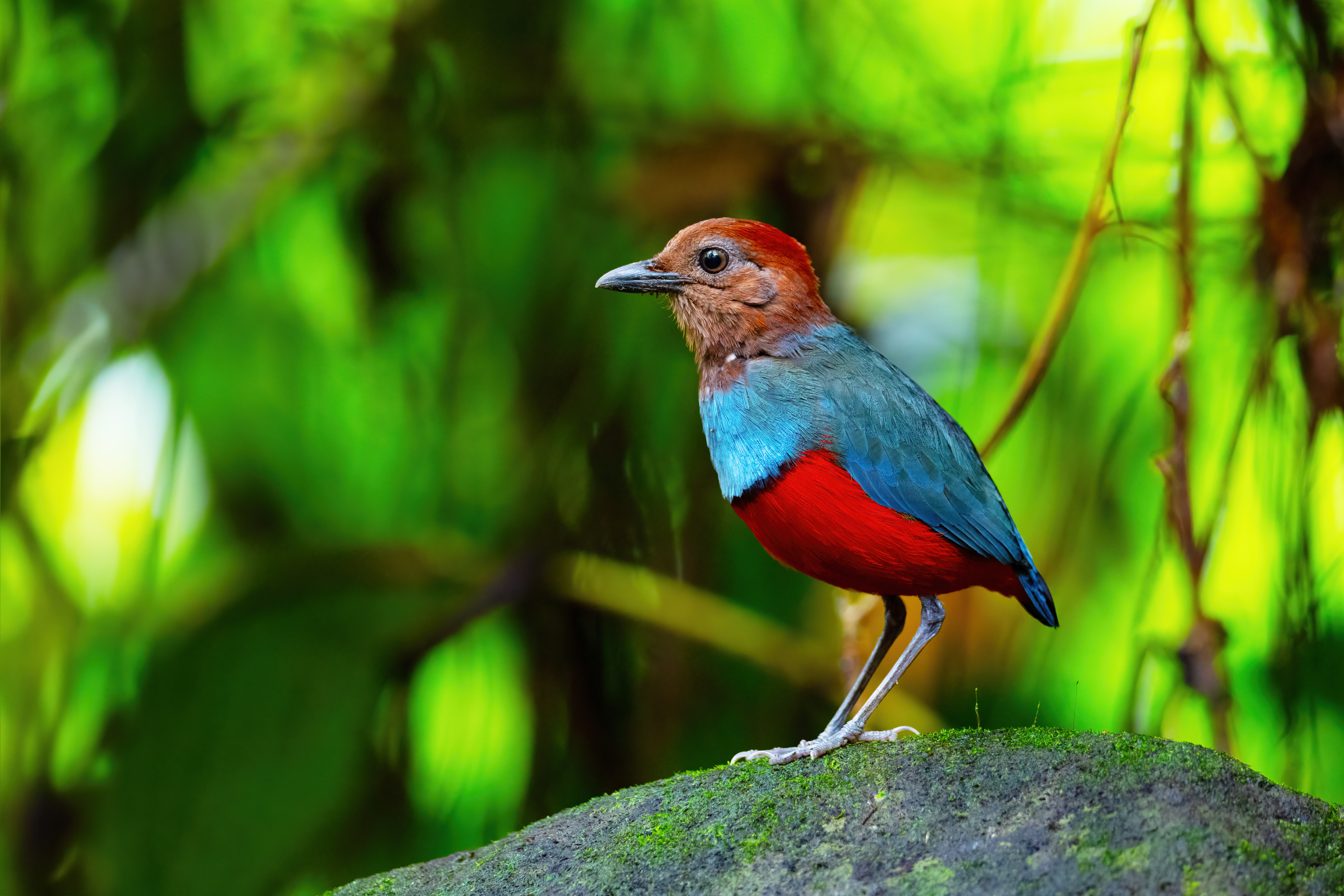
- ssp. rufiventris
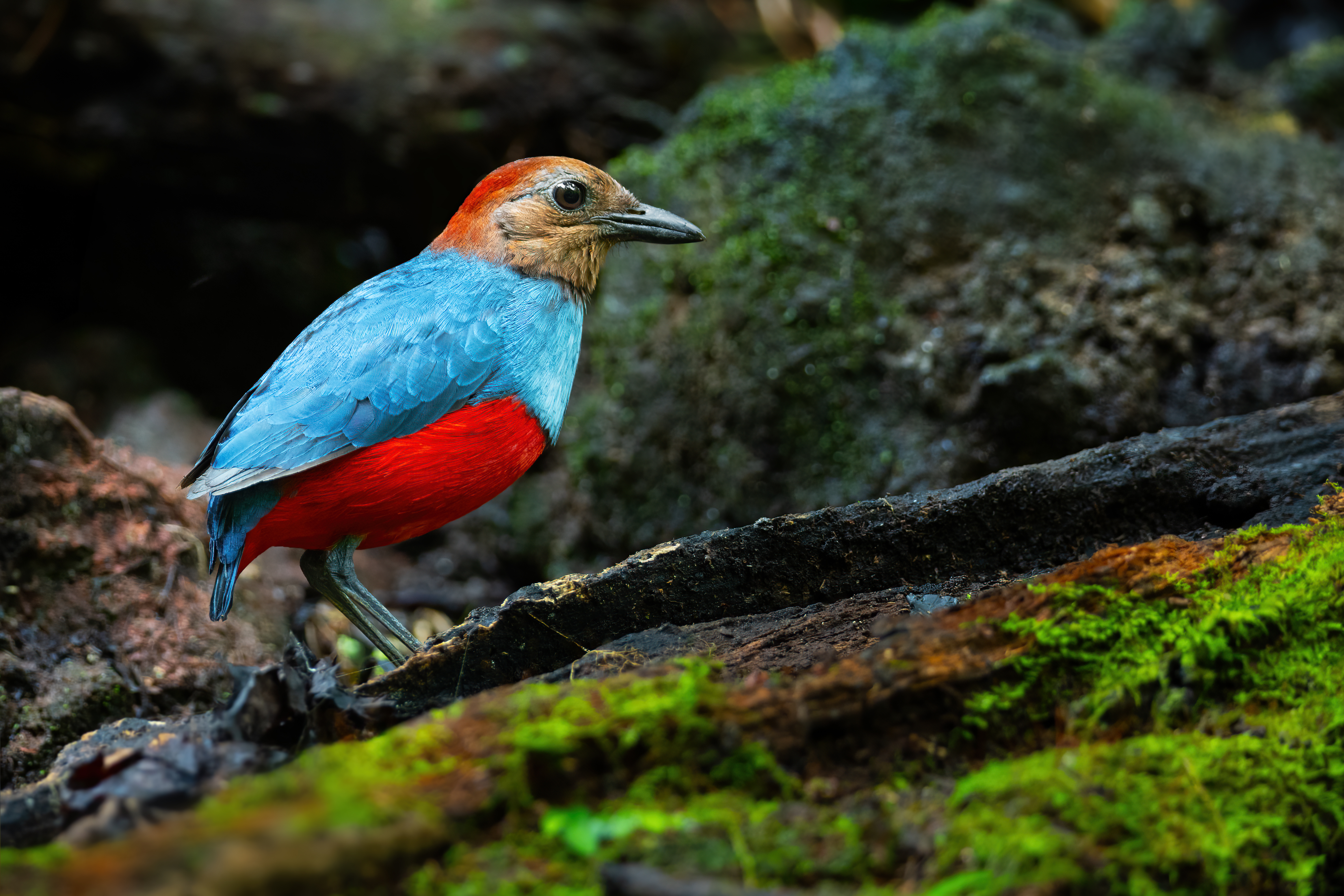
- ssp. cyanonota

Conservation status
- Least Concern (IUCN 3.1)

Scientific classification
- Kingdom: Animalia
- Phylum: Chordata
- Class: Aves
- Order: Passeriformes
- Family: Pittidae
- Genus: Erythropitta
- Species: E. rufiventris

Binomial name
- Erythropitta rufiventris (Heine, 1860)

Synonyms
- Erythropitta erythrogaster rufiventris

= North Moluccan pitta =

Species of bird

The North Moluccan pitta (Erythropitta rufiventris) is a species of pitta. It was long considered a subspecies of the red-bellied pitta, but was split on the basis of genetic and morphological studies. It is endemic to Indonesia where it occurs on the northern Moluccas. Its natural habitat is tropical moist lowland forests. While it has suffered some habitat loss, it is not considered threatened with extinction.

== Taxonomy and systematics ==
The North Moluccan pitta was first described by German ornithologist Ferdinand Heine in 1860. The species was long placed as a subspecies of the red-bellied pitta, which had up to 28 subspecies, ranging from the Philippines to the Bismarck Archipelago in New Guinea, and was described by Ernst Mayr as a "great speciator". A study of both the genetics and morphology of this species, published in 2013, split this species out, and identified a total of 17 species in this species complex. The break up of the species complex was not initially followed by the major ornithological organisations, but a further study of the morphology of the group against new criteria for species delimitation supported many of the splits, and the split is now generally accepted. The North Moluccan pitta itself has three to four subspecies, depending on the authority.

== Description ==
The North Moluccan pitta is a typical member of the red-bellied pitta species complex. It measures 16 to 18 cm (6.3–7.1 in) and one female has been weighed at 91 g (3.2 oz). The nominate race has a bright red belly and a bright blue breast, separated by a thing green band. The head is brown with a more russet crown and reddish nape. The back is green and the wings are blue-green. The subspecies E. r. obiensis is similar to the nominate but has a duller blue breast. E. r. cyanonota also has a duller breast but also has a dull blue back and a brighter red nape. E. r. bernsteini resembles E. r. cyanonota but has a silvery blue breast and is slightly larger.

== Distribution and habitat ==
The North Moluccan pitta is, as its name implies, endemic to the Moluccan Islands in Indonesia. The nominate race is found on the islands of Morotai, Halmahera, Moti, the Bacan Islands and Damar. E. r. cyanonota is found on Ternate, E. r. bernsteini on Gebe and E. r. obiensis on Obi.

The species inhabits a range of forested habitats, from primary rainforest to selectivly logged forest, secondary forest and scrubland. It ranges from sea-level as high as 2,100 m (6,900 ft). It is not thought to be migratory, but it has been suggested that it may be nomadic when climatic conditions make foraging unfavourable.

== Behaviour ==
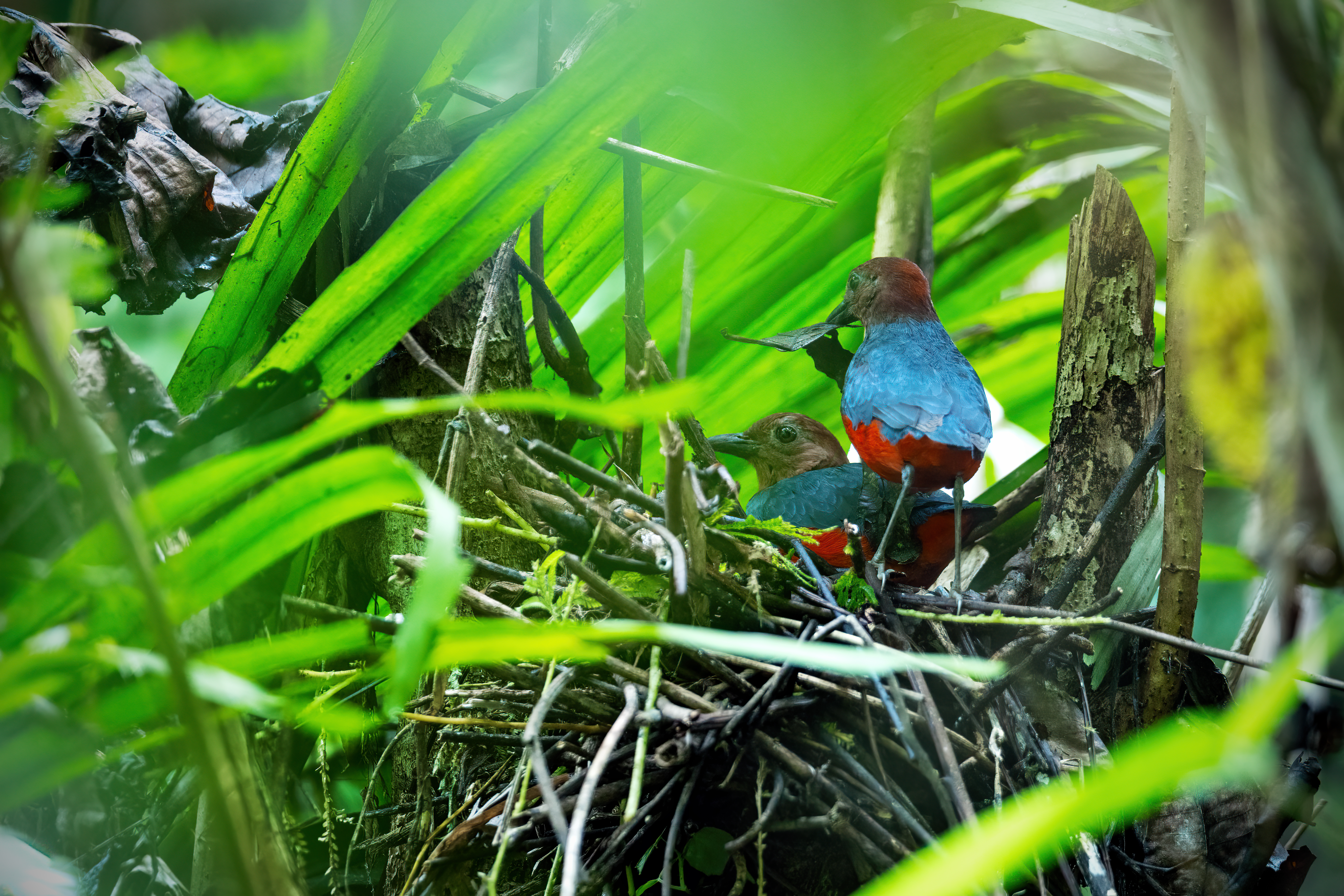
Pair engaged in nest construction

The diet of the North Moluccan pitta has not been described, but is likely composed of earthworms and other invertebrates as with other members of the family. There appears to be no set breeding season, the female lays two eggs which are white with brown-red and grey-lillac spots.

== Conservation ==
The North Mollucan pittas has a limited range, but while its habitat has suffered from some logging, and the species is targetted by the cagebird trade, much of its habitat remains intact and the species is not considered to be threatened. Surveys on Obi found it to be common, but less common on Halmahera.
