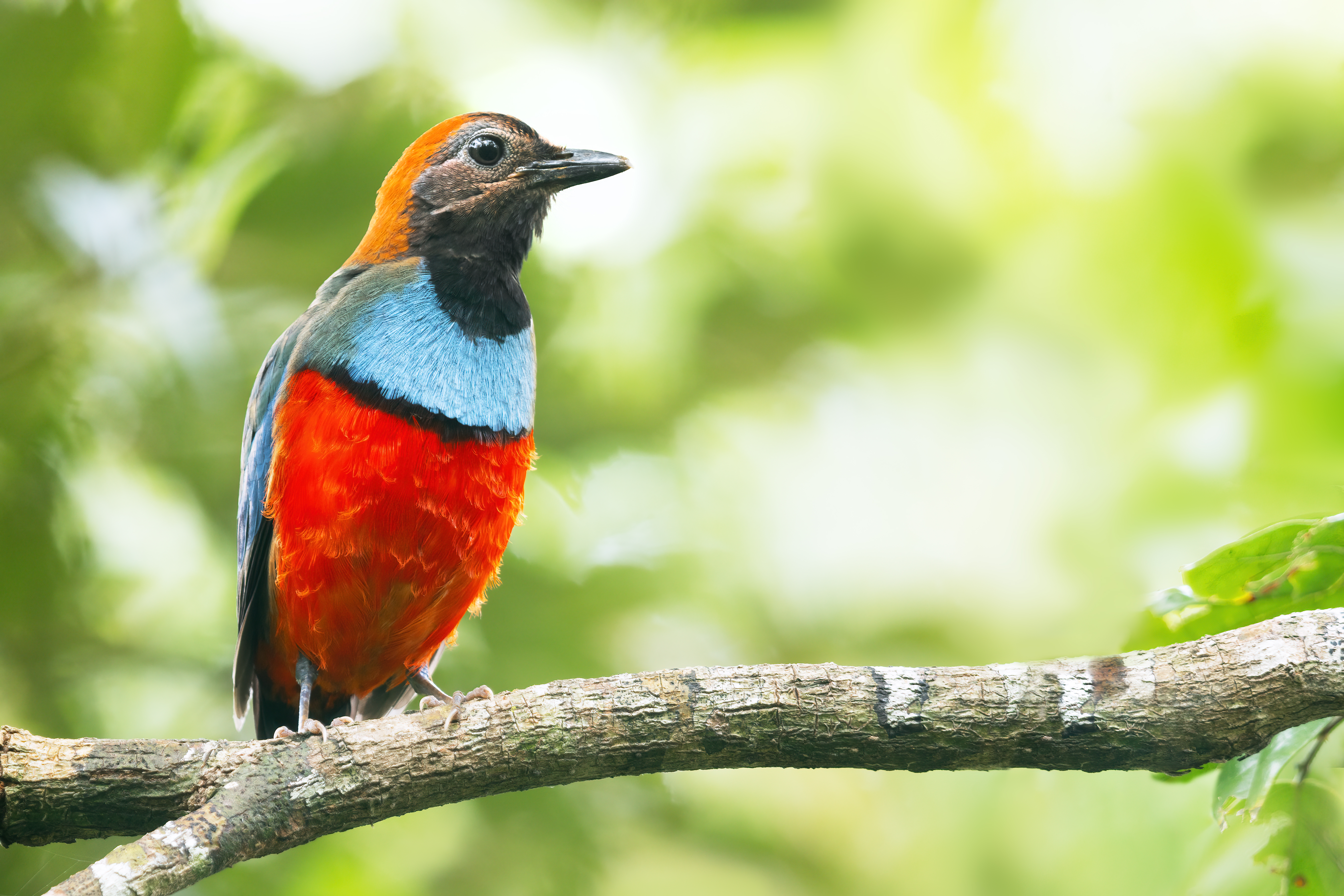

Conservation status
- Least Concern (IUCN 3.1)

Scientific classification
- Kingdom: Animalia
- Phylum: Chordata
- Class: Aves
- Order: Passeriformes
- Family: Pittidae
- Genus: Erythropitta
- Species: E. macklotii

Binomial name
- Erythropitta macklotii (Temminck, 1834)
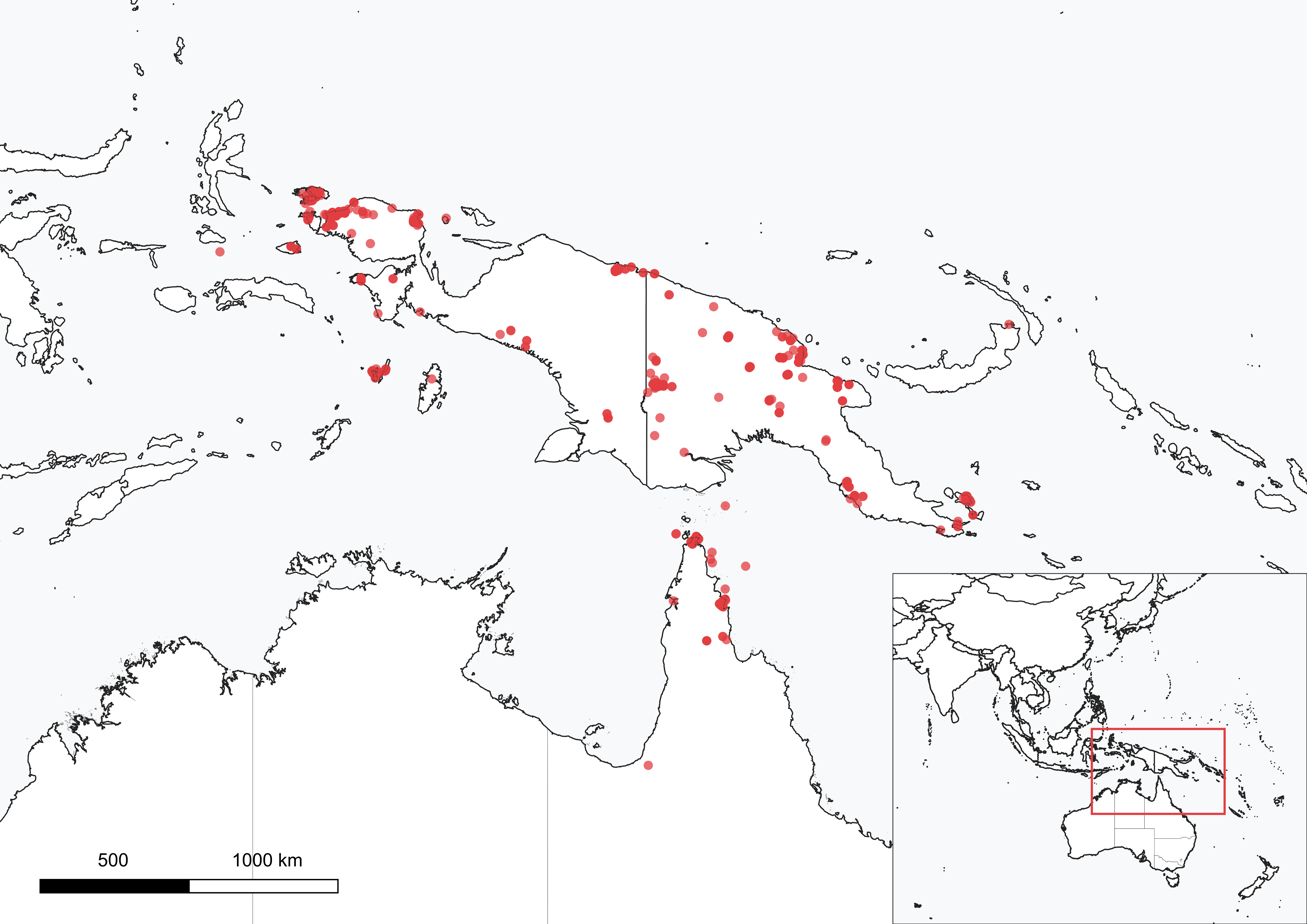
- Species distribution

Synonyms
- Pitta macklotii Erythropitta erythrogaster macklotii

= Papuan pitta =

Species of bird

The Papuan pitta (Erythropitta macklotii) is a species of pitta. It was formerly considered a subspecies of the red-bellied pitta. It is found in the Aru Islands, New Guinea and the northern Cape York Peninsula. Its natural habitat is subtropical or tropical moist lowland forest. It is threatened by habitat loss.

== Gallery ==
Video of an individual in Iron Range NP, Australia, moving along as it flicks wings and wags tail

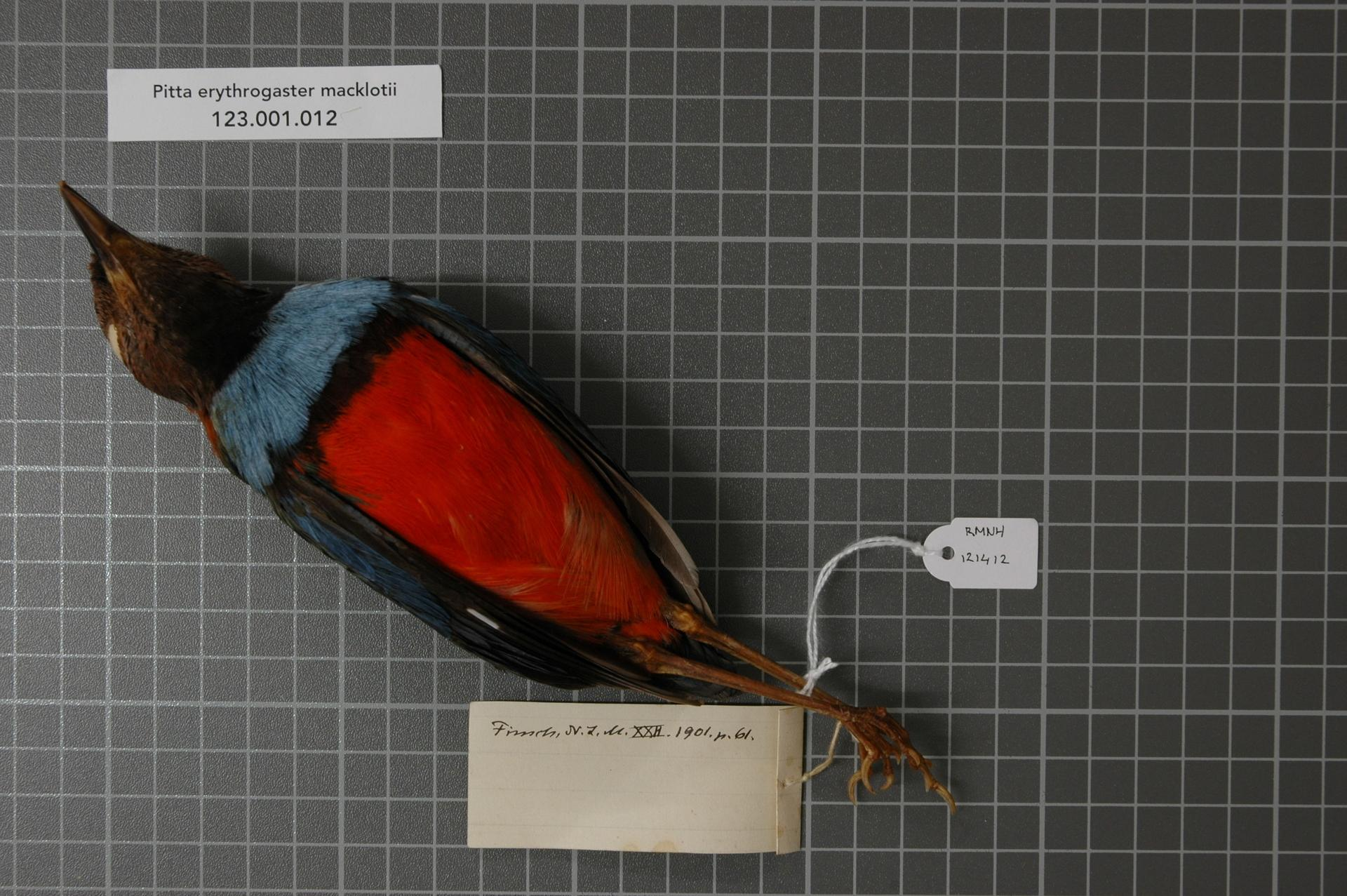
Adult male specimen from northwestern New Guinea, at the Naturalis Biodiversity Center
