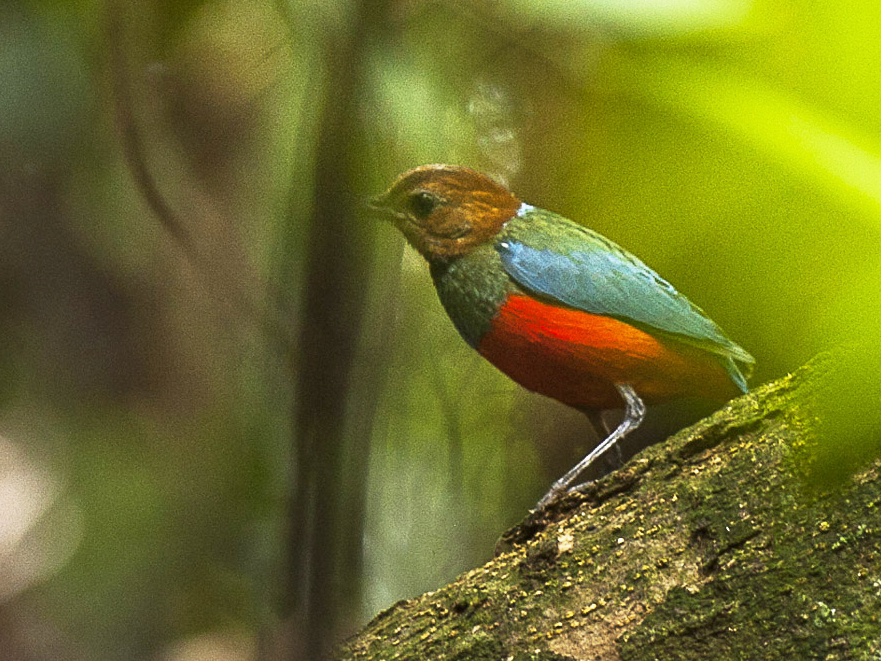
- An adult of the nominate subspecies

Conservation status
- Least Concern (IUCN 3.1)

Scientific classification
- Kingdom: Animalia
- Phylum: Chordata
- Class: Aves
- Order: Passeriformes
- Family: Pittidae
- Genus: Erythropitta
- Species: E. erythrogaster

Binomial name
- Erythropitta erythrogaster (Temminck, 1823)

Synonyms
- Pitta erythrogaster

= Philippine pitta =

Species of bird

The Philippine pitta (Erythropitta erythrogaster) or blue-breasted pitta, is a species of bird in the family Pittidae. It is a striking and colorful with a red belly, black throat, a brown head, a blue chest, rump and tail. It is found in Indonesia and the Philippines. Its natural habitat is tropical moist lowland forest. It is part of the Red-bellied pitta species complex.

== Description and taxonomy ==
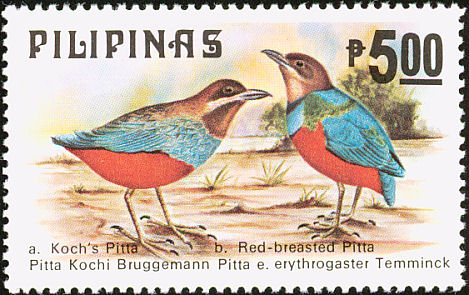
A 1979 Philippine stamp featuring the Whiskered pitta and Philippine pitta

It is part of the Red-bellied pitta species complex which includes a total of 9 different pitta species and is continuing to be further split with a potential to reach 17 total species. It is differentiated by its all cobalt-blue upperparts and breast-sides, plain dark brown crown versus paler brown crown with dark brown lateral stripes, much reduced or no white in centre of black throat, stronger red belly, longer bill, and distinctly shorter wings.

=== Subspecies ===
Four subspecies are recognized:

- E. e. erythrogaster– Found on Philippines (except Calamian Group, Palawan and Sulu Archipelago).
- E. e. propinqua – Found on Palawan and the Calamian Islands
- E. e. yairocho – Found on Sulu Archipelago
- E. e. inspeculata – Found on Talaud Islands

== Ecology and behavior ==
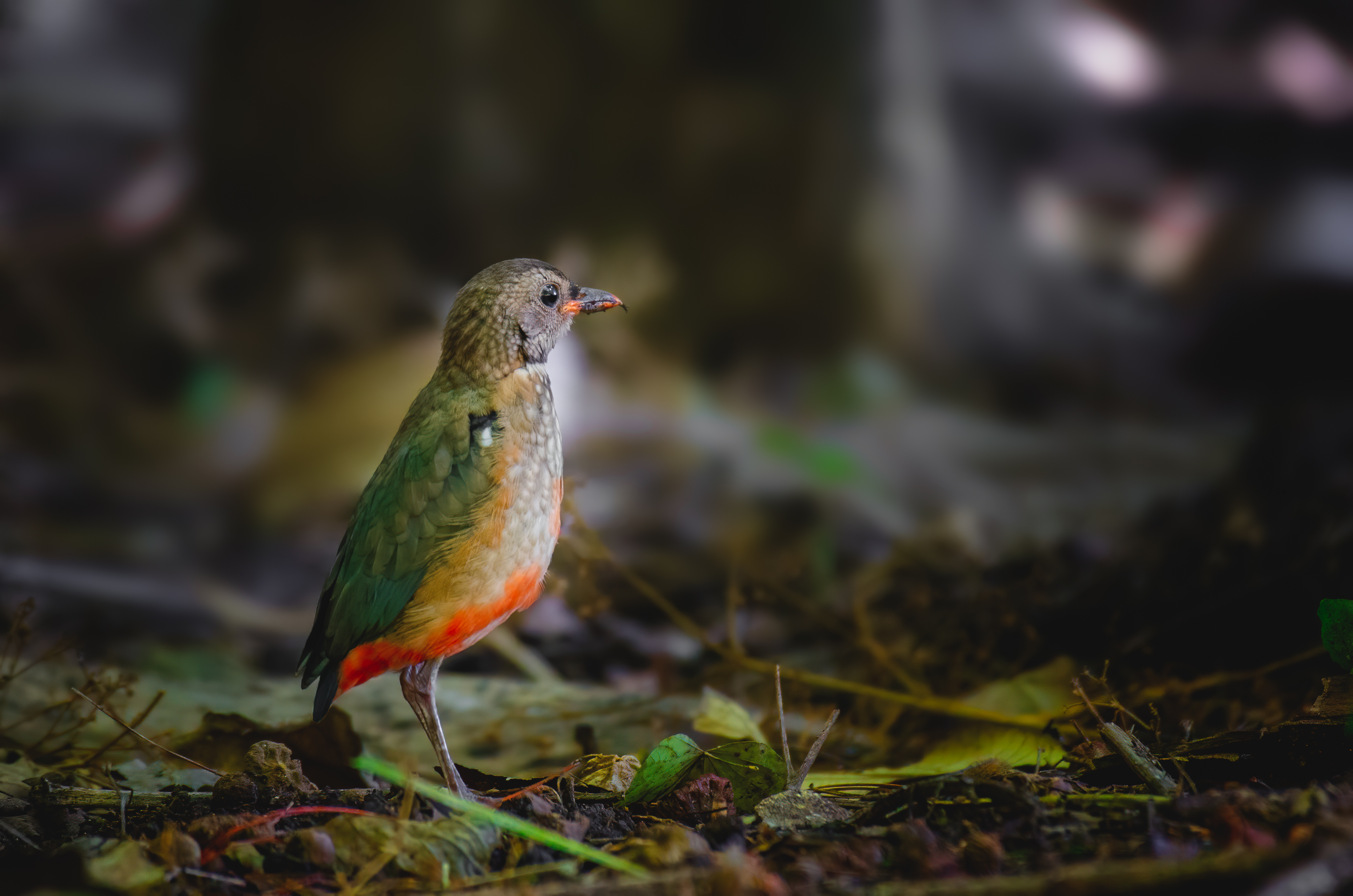
A juvenile of the nominate subspecies

Forages on the forest floor by gleaning the leaf litter in search for worms and other small insects. Recorded to breed throughout the year,

== Habitat and conservation status ==
This species habitat is primary, secondary forest, scrub, forest edge, thickets and bamboo groves up to 2,100 meters above sea level. This species is adapatable to multiple forest types and can tolerate more disturbed habitat.

IUCN has assessed this bird as least-concern species with the population believed to be declining due to deforestation in the Philippines continues throughout the country due to slash and burn farming, mining, illegal logging and habitat conversion. It is also occasionally caught for the pet trade or for bushmeat.

It is found in multiple protected areas such as Bicol Natural Park, Pasonanca Natural Park, Rajah Sikatuna Protected Landscape, Samar Island Natural Park but like all areas in the Philippines, protection is lax and deforestation continues despite this protection on paper.
