= 602nd Anti-Aircraft Artillery Gun Battalion =

602nd AAA Gun Battalion
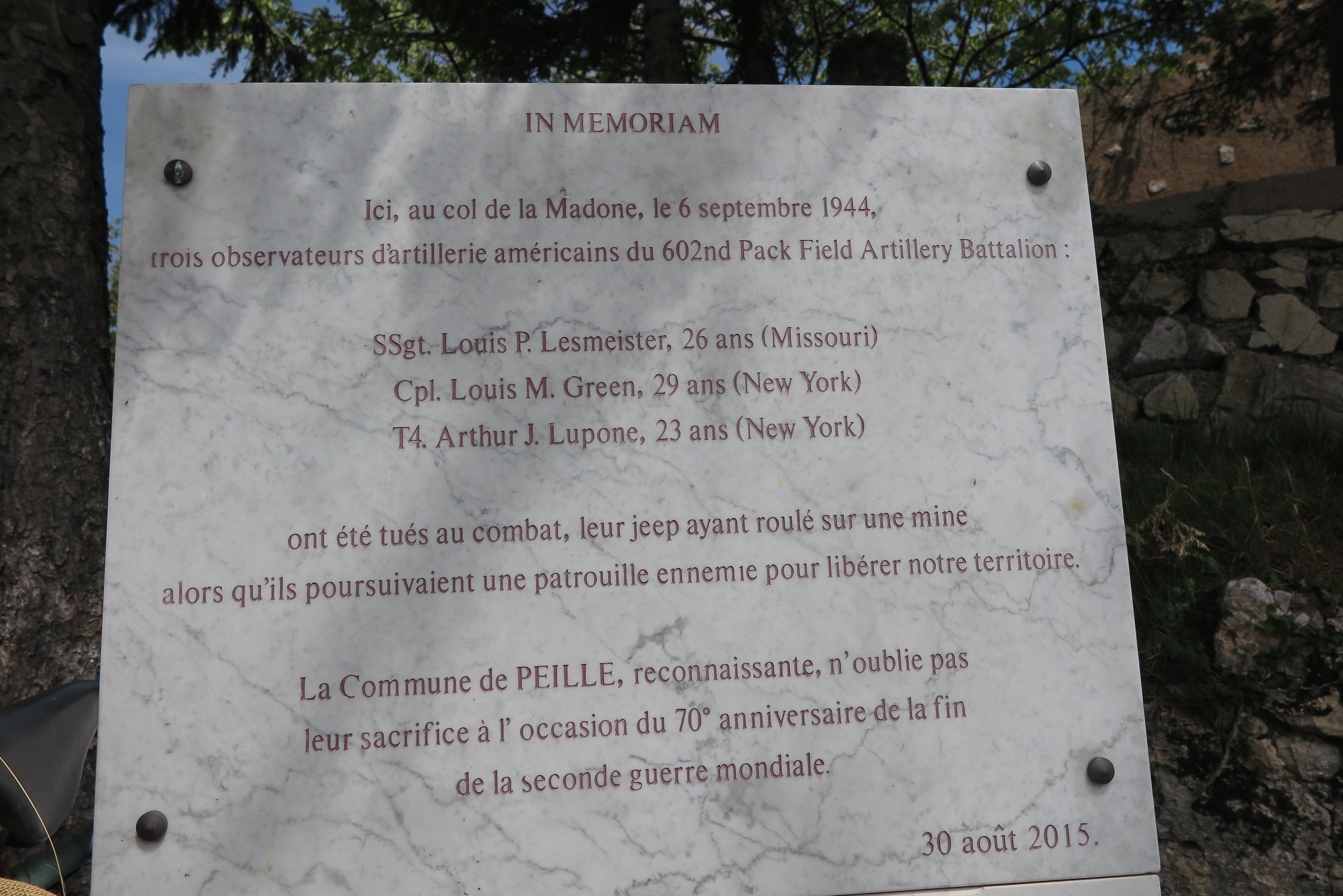
- Memorial in France
- Active: 1942–1945
- Country: USA
- Branch: Army
- Type: Anti Aircraft Artillery
- Engagements: Defense of Paris, and Antwerp; Battle of the Bulge

Commanders
- Commanding Officer: Lt. Colonel Blair C. Forbes
- Executive Officer: Major George E. Rogers

Creating 602nd Anti-Aircraft Artillery Gun Battalion was an Anti-aircraft artillery battalion of the United States Army during World War II.

The unit began in 1942 as 1st Battalion of the 602d CA (AA) in Fort Bliss, briefly in New York City as Antiaircraft Artillery Command of the Eastern Defense Command and shipped over to Britain, then onto France and Germany (1944).

== Notable members ==
- Sid Bernstein, music producer
