= Sid Bernstein Presents =

Sid Bernstein Presents...
- Directed by: Jason Ressler; Evan Strome
- Written by: Jason Ressler; Evan Strome
- Produced by: Lisa Thomas
- Cinematography: Peter Zimmern
- Edited by: Jason Ressler; Evan Strome
- Production company: Boerum Hill Productions
- Release date: February 2010
- Running time: 100 minutes
- Country: United States
- Language: English

Sid Bernstein Presents... is a 2010 feature-length documentary film by directors Jason Ressler and Evan Strome about music promoter Sid Bernstein. The film, which stars Lenny Kravitz, Tito Puente, Dick Clark, The Rascals, Paul Anka, Shirley MacLaine, and The Moody Blues, chronicles the life of Bernstein in a narrative that Ressler has described as "a film about the American Dream [seen] through the eyes of one of the greatest promoters in modern history." Bernstein is credited with bringing The Beatles, The Rolling Stones, Herman's Hermits, The Rascals and a number of other prominent bands of the British Invasion to America. Bernstein also promoted musicians James Brown, Tito Puente, Ray Charles, The Dave Clark Five, Nina Simone, Jethro Tull and a number of other leading rock 'n roll, blues, jazz, and Latin artists.

Looking further into the story behind Bernstein, Ressler and Strome found that he is under-recognized despite a massive contribution to music, which included Bernstein's invention of the stadium concert with the 1965 Shea Stadium Concert, the benefit concert, multiple Beatles reunion attempts, and his organizing of some of the first mixed-race rock concerts in America.

Sid Bernstein Presents... includes interviews with Lenny Kravitz, Dick Clark, Shirley MacLaine, Paul Anka, Eric Burdon, The Rascals, and The Moody Blues. The film's interviews with mambo star Tito Puente and soul music great James Brown are reported to have been the last-recorded film interviews of both musicians before their respective deaths.

Sid Bernstein Presents... made its world premiere at the DocNZ film festival in Auckland, New Zealand in February 2010.
