= Dina Bursztyn =

Argentine artist (born 1948)

Dina Bursztyn (born 1948) is an Argentine writer and visual artist whose works have been exhibited in galleries, museums and public spaces throughout America and abroad.

== Personal life ==
Bursztyn was born and raised in Argentina. She moved to the New York City in 1976.

== Education ==
Bursztyn has a Masters in Latin American literature from the Universidad Nacional de Cordoba, Argentina.

== Featured works ==
Bursztyn's works have been featured at: Art in General (New York City), Artists Space, The Arts Exchange, the Bronx Museum, the Center for Book Arts, the Central Library of Mexico, the Chappaqua, the Ex Gallery (Tokyo, Japan), the Library Gallery, and the Neuberger Museum. Views from Above is displayed on the New York City Subway as part of MTA Arts and Design.

Her works have also been exhibited at the following events: Bronx Bound at Lehman College of Art, Bronx, Moving Targets, at the Universitat Der Kunste, Berlin Academy of Fine Arts, Poznan, Poland; Contemporary Women Artist: New York, at Indiana State University and Unexpected Visitors at Maxwell Fine Arts, Peekskill, New York).

In print, her works have been featured in: Ceramics Monthly, Daily News Magazine, Double Take Magazine, National Public Radio and The New York Times.

== Sculptures ==
Bursztyn's sculptures include: "Cosmic Turtle" (sponsored by the Prospect Park Alliance), "Gargoyles to Scare Developers", (sponsored by the Urban Homesteading Assistance Board), "Lady River" (2002) "Machine to Transform Illegal Aliens into Legal" (1999), "Telepathic Mailbox" (commissioned by the Public Art Fund).

Her sculptures have been described as having "a distinctly contemporary, metropolitan edge, transmitting a message of feminine strength and potential. They are modern goddesses."

== Educational endeavors ==
In addition to her focus on art, Burstyn works in a variety of elementary and middle school educational programs in the New York City area. This includes the creation and implementation of workshops for students, teachers and teaching artists throughout the region's art organizations, libraries, museums and public schools.

== Awards ==
Bursztyn has received public art commission awards from MTA Arts and Design, NYC Department of Cultural Affairs Percent for Arts Program, and the Public Art Fund.

== Publications ==
Dina Bursztyn wrote 'The Land of Lost Things' – El Pais de Las Cosas Perdidas (published by Arte Public Press). She was behind the creation of 'When I was a Tree' (published by Publication Studio), containing the collection of her sketch books, paintings, poems, journals, artist's books and prints, which have been displayed at her studios in New York City and the Catskill.
