= Susan Burnstine =

American photographer and journalist (born 1966)

- Born: 1966 (age 59–60)
- Education: University of Miami
- Occupation: Fine art photographer
- Writing career
- Notable works: Within Shadows, Absence of Being
- Notable awards: Gold Medal for Within Shadows at the 2011 Prix de la Photographie Paris
- Website: susanburnstine.com

Susan Burnstine (born 1966) is an American fine art photographer and journalist, originally from Chicago and now based in Los Angeles. She is best known for haunting, ethereal images that illustrate her dreams. She began making photographs as a way of facing and working through nightmares and night terrors that have haunted her since childhood. She is also known for making her own cameras and lenses, initially from ruins of toy camera bodies, and now 100% homemade with additions from found objects and assorted other materials that best represent her vision of her dreams. Burnstine has written for many notable photography publications, including a monthly column for B&W Magazine UK.

== Within Shadows ==
Burnstine's first book, Within Shadows, is a collection of 45 images from three distinct series, "On Waking Dreams," "Between" and "Flight." The book, which explores her own intense dreams, won a Gold Medal in the Pro Fine Arts division, and a Bronze Medal overall at the 2011 Prix de la Photographie Paris. Within Shadows was also selected as a Best Book of 2011 by PhotoEye Magazine.

== Absence of Being ==
"Absence of Being", Burnstine's second monograph, began after the death of her father, when her nightmares, which had been the impetus for Within Shadows returned. The work is shot from a higher perspective than her earlier work, reflecting the vision of her father, looking down upon her. This body of work retains her signature dark and dramatic, blurred effects. The entirety of this series can be found in her second monograph, "Absence of Being." (Damiani, 2016)

== Where Shadows Cease: Resonance of America's Dream ==
Burnstine's first color series is "Where Shadows Cease: Resonance of America's Dream".
