= Halmahera rain forests =

Ecoregion in Halmahera, Indonesia

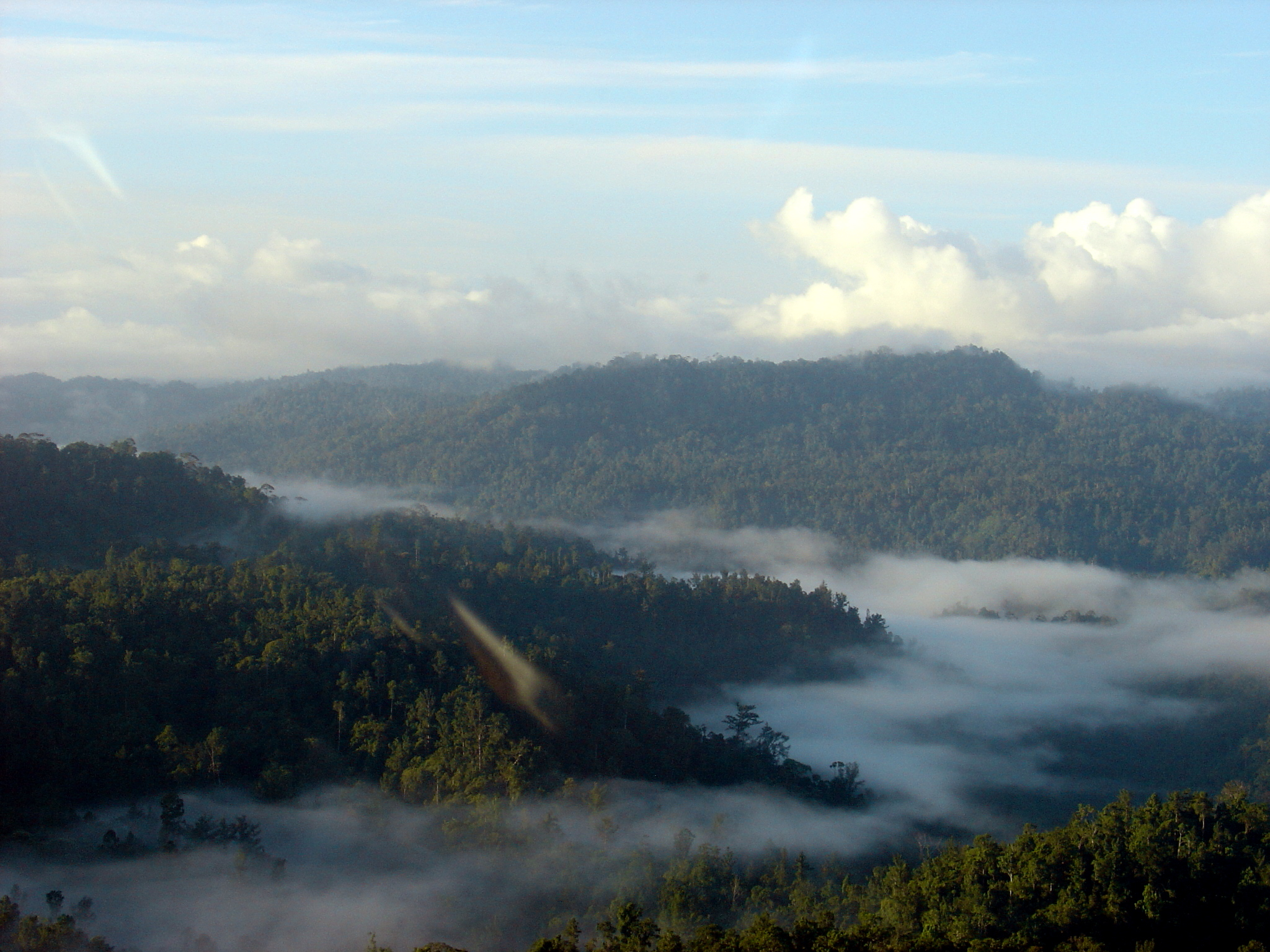
- Halmahera Island

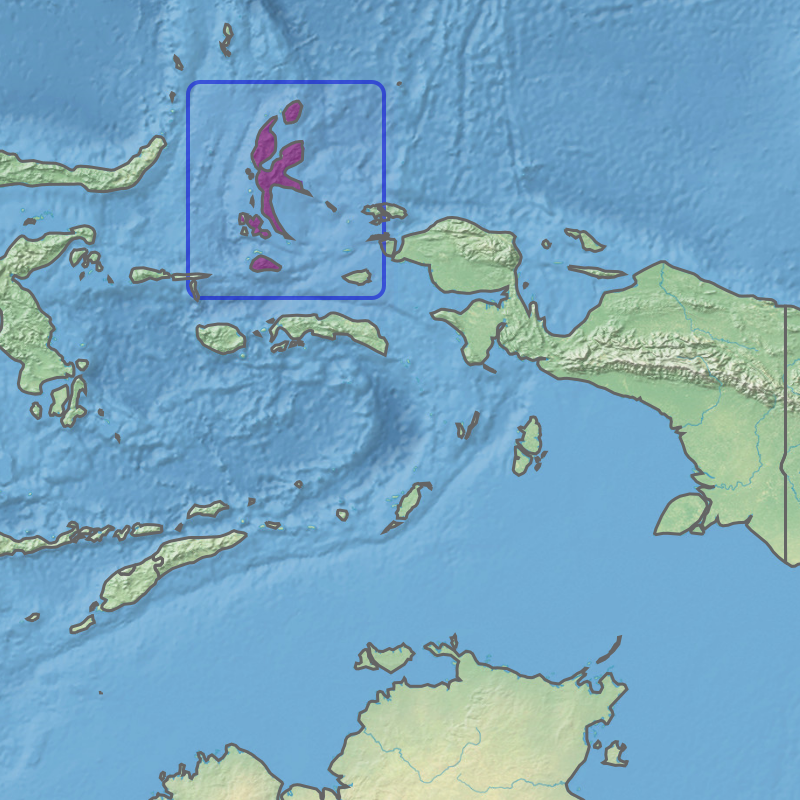
- Ecoregion territory (in purple)

Ecology
- Realm: Australasian realm
- Biome: tropical and subtropical moist broadleaf forests

Geography
- Area: 26,082 km^{2} (10,070 sq mi)
- Countries: Indonesia
- Province: North Maluku
- Coordinates: 0.6°N 127.87°E

Conservation
- Conservation status: Relatively stable/intact
- Protected: 2,052 km² (8%)

The Halmahera rain forests is a tropical moist forest ecoregion in Indonesia. The ecoregion includes the island of Halmahera and neighboring islands, including Bacan, Morotai, the Obi Islands, Ternate, Tidore, Gebe, and many smaller islands.

== Geography ==
Halmahera is the largest island in the ecoregion, with an area of 17,780 km^{2}. The islands are mountainous, and portions are volcanic in origin. Several volcanoes are still active, including Mount Gamkonora (1,560 m) the highest peak on Halmahera.

The islands that make up the ecoregion are part of Wallacea, a group of islands that are part of the Australasian realm, but were never joined to either the Australian or Asian continents. The islands of Wallacea are home to a mix of plants and animals from both terrestrial realms, and have many unique species that evolved in isolation. The eastern boundary of the ecoregion follows Lydekker's Line, which demarcates the islands of Wallacea from the islands on the Australia-New Guinea continental shelf which were joined during the ice ages when sea levels were lower.

== Climate ==
The ecoregion has a tropical rain forest climate.

== Flora ==
The main plant communities tropical lowland evergreen and semi-evergreen rain forest.

Syzygium aromaticum is native to the ecoregion, and its aromatic flower buds are the source of the spice clove. Myristica fragrans, another native, is the source of nutmeg and mace, which are derived from its seeds. Both trees are widely cultivated on the islands.

The recently discovered palm tree Jailoloa halmaherensis is endemic to Halmahera.

== Fauna ==
The ecoregion is home to 38 mammal species. Seven species are endemic – the ornate cuscus (Phalanger ornatus), Rothschild's cuscus (Phalanger rothschildi), Gebe cuscus (Phalanger alexandrae), blue-eyed cuscus (Phalanger matabiru), masked flying fox (Pteropus personatus), Obi mosaic-tailed rat (Melomys obiensis), and Molaccan prehensile-tailed rat (Rattus morotaiensis). Cuscuses are arboreal marsupials with origins in Australasia.

The ecoregion is home to 223 bird species. It corresponds to the Northern Maluku endemic bird area. 23 species are endemic to the ecoregion. The endemics include four birds which are the only species in their genera, including the elusive invisible rail (Habroptila wallacii), the white-streaked friarbird (Melitograis gilolensis), and two birds of paradise, the Halmahera paradise-crow (Lycocorax pyrrhopterus) and standardwing bird-of-paradise (Semioptera wallacii).

The ecoregion is also home to the world's largest bee, Wallace's giant bee (Megachile pluto).

== Protected areas ==
A 2017 assessment found that 2,052 km^{2}, or 8%, of the ecoregion is in protected areas. Almost two-thirds of the unprotected area is still forested. Protected areas include Aketajawe-Lolobata National Park on Halmahera (1,673 km^{2}).
