= Carl Schwaner =

German geologist and naturalist (1817–1851)

Carl Anton Ludwig Maria Schwaner (16 February 1817 in Mannheim – 30 March 1851 in Batavia) was a German geologist and naturalist.

He studied geology and mineralogy in Heidelberg, afterwards being associated with the museum of natural history in Leiden. In 1842, on a recommendation from Coenraad Jacob Temminck, he became a member of the Natuurkundige Commissie voor Nederlandsch Indië (Scientific commission of the Dutch East Indies).

He arrived in Batavia of the Dutch East Indies in August 1842, and following certain delays, traveled to Borneo in order to conduct geological investigations. From 1843 to 1848, he performed geological, topographical, zoological and ethnographical research on Borneo. From November 1847 to February 1848, he trekked from the southern town of Bandjermasin, through the interior of the island, to Pontianak on its western coast; thus becoming the first European to accomplish such a feat. In 1848 he returned to Batavia in order to evaluate his findings. Here he died three years later from a fever just prior to embarking on another scientific mission to Borneo.

He was founder of the Natuurkundige Vereeniging in Nederlandsch-Indië, serving as its president until late 1850. A small portion of his Indonesian collections later became part of the Rijksmuseum in Leiden. The Schwanergebirge (Schwaner Mountain Range) of Borneo is named in his honor.

== Associated writings ==
- Reis naar, en aanteekeningen betreffende de steenkolen van Batoe Belian : (Zuid-Oostkust van Borneo) (with JH Croockewit), 1847 - Travel to and notes made on the coal of Batu Belian: (southeast coast of Borneo).
- Historische, geografische en statistieke aanteekeningen betreffende Tanah Boemboe : aangetroffen onder de bij het Gouvernement van Nederlandsch-Indie¨ berustende papieren van C.A.L.M. Schwaner (edited by Elisa Netscher), 1851 - Historical, geographical and statistical notes made on Tanah Boemboe: found among the documents held by the Government of the Netherlands Indies, papers of C.A.L.M. Schwaner.
- Aanteekeningen betreffende eenige maatschappelijke instellingen en gebruiken der Dajaks van Doesson (edited by J H Croockewit), ca.1852 - Notes made on some social institutions and practices of the Dayaks of Doesson.
- Borneo: beschrijving van het stroomgebeid van den Barito, en reizen langs eenige voorname rivieren van het Zuid-Oosterlijk gedeelte van dat eiland (edited by Jan Pijnappel), 1853 - Borneo: description of the basin of the Barito River, and travel along some major rivers of the southeastern part of the island.
