= Red-bellied pitta =

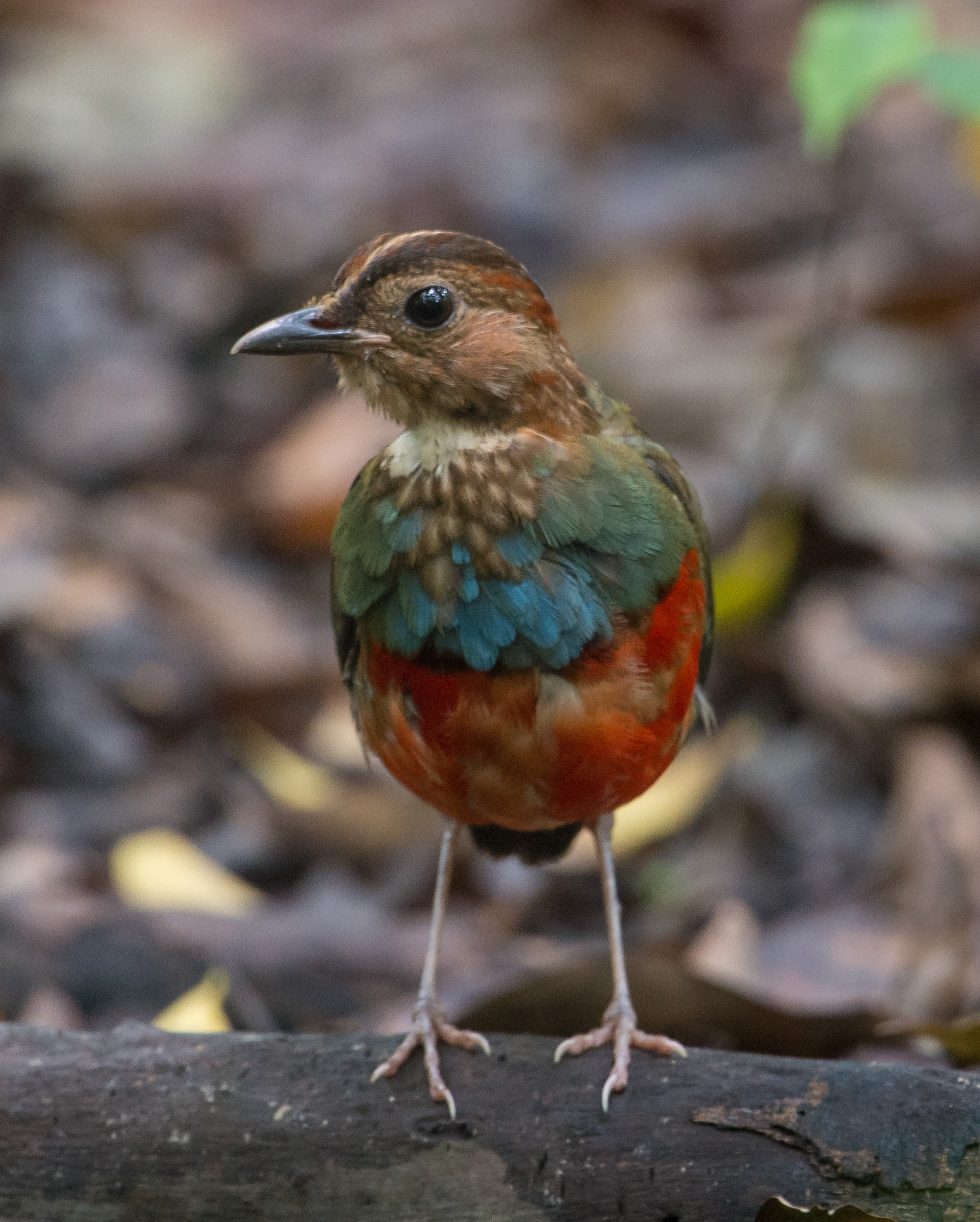
Sulawesi pitta

Red-bellied pitta has been split into the following species:

- Philippine pitta, Erythropitta erythrogaster
- Sula pitta, Erythropitta dohertyi
- Sulawesi pitta, Erythropitta celebensis
- Siau pitta, Erythropitta palliceps
- Sangihe pitta, Erythropitta caeruleitorques
- South Moluccan pitta, Erythropitta rubrinucha
- North Moluccan pitta, Erythropitta rufiventris
- Louisiade pitta, Erythropitta meeki
- Bismarck pitta, Erythropitta novaehibernicae
- Papuan pitta, Erythropitta macklotii
