= Bernard Bernstein =

Bernard Bernstein may refer to:

- Bernard Bernstein (economist) (1908–1990), American economist, lawyer, public official, and U.S. Army colonel
- Bernard Bernstein (metalsmith) (1928–2021), American metalsmith and teacher
- Bernard Bernstein (table tennis) (1899–1963), English table tennis player
