= Andrew Bernstein =

Andrew Bernstein may refer to:

- Andrew Bernstein (director), American television director
- Andrew Bernstein (philosopher), American philosopher
- Andrew D. Bernstein, American sports photographer
- Abdominal (rapper) (Andrew Bernstein, born 1974), Canadian rapper
