= Theodore Menline Bernstein =

American newspaper editor

Theodore Menline Bernstein (November 17, 1904 – June 27, 1979) was an assistant managing editor of The New York Times and from 1925 to 1950 a professor at the Columbia University School of Journalism.

== Biography ==
Bernstein obtained his B.A. from Columbia University in 1924. Among many other responsibilities in the 1950s and 1960s, it fell to Bernstein and his colleague, Lewis Jordan, to make up the next day's front page of the Times. His colleagues often saved his drafts on particularly newsworthy days. During the run-up to the Bay of Pigs Invasion fiasco in 1961, the two settled on a four-column lead headline that put the invasion into dramatic perspective. However, under pressure from President John F. Kennedy, publisher Orvil Dryfoos ordered that the story be toned down, and the headline reduced to one column. Bernstein and Jordan were both infuriated, even after Dryfoos personally explained his decision to them. The story is told in detail in Without Fear or Favor by former Times editor Harrison Salisbury.

== Publications ==
He wrote or co-wrote 7 books on grammar and usage, which have all been reprinted and republished since their first appearances. They are:

- Headlines and Deadlines: A Manual for Copy Editors (1933) (coauthored with Robert E. Garst) (ISBN 0-231-04816-5)
- Watch Your Language: A Lively, Informal Guide to Better Writing, Emanating from the News Room of the New York Times (1958) (ISBN 0-689-70531-X)
- More Language that Needs Watching: Second Aid for Writers and Editors, Emanating from the News Room of the New York Times (1962) (LCCN 62-18182)
- The Careful Writer (1965) (ISBN 0-684-82632-1)
- Miss Thistlebottom's Hobgoblins: The Careful Writer's Guide To The Taboos, Bugbears, and Outmoded Rules of English Usage (1971) (ISBN 0374210438)
- Bernstein's Reverse Dictionary (1975) (with the collaboration of Jane Wagner) (ISBN 0812905660)
- Dos, Don'ts & Maybes of English Usage (1977) (with the assistance of Marylea Meyersohn and Bertram Lippman) (ISBN 0812906950)

== Quotes ==
"Now, I am a firm believer in democracy, but I also believe that there are some fields of human activity in which a count of noses does not provide the best basis for law and order."—from The Careful Writer
