= Abraham Bernstein =

Abraham Bernstein may refer to:

- Abraham Bernstein (politician) (1918–1990), New York state senator
- Abe Bernstein (c. 1892–1968), Detroit gangster and a leader of the infamous Prohibition-era Purple Gang
- Arthur Gilbert (real estate developer) (Abraham Bernstein, 1913–2001), British real estate developer, art collector and philanthropist
