= Justice Bernstein =

Justice Bernstein may refer to:

- Charles C. Bernstein (1904–1976), associate justice of the Arizona Supreme Court
- Richard H. Bernstein (born 1974), associate justice of the Michigan Supreme Court
