= Ken Burnstine =

Kenneth G. Burnstine (died 16 June 1976) was an American drug smuggler and pilot who was described by the Associated Press in 1981 as "one of America's most daring drug smugglers". At the time of his death in an aircraft accident, Burnstine was cooperating with federal prosecutors having been sentenced to seven years in prison for conspiracy to create a $500m drug trafficking ring based in Fort Lauderdale, Florida. The North American P-51 Mustang in which Burnstine crashed while approaching Mojave Airport was the aircraft with which he had won the 1974 Reno Air Races.

== Career ==
After graduating from Northwestern University, Burnstine enlisted in the US Marines in July 1954. He served in Korea in 1955 before being sent to Marine Aircraft Group 11 in Atsugi, Japan, where he was given counterintelligence credentials. In March 1956 Burnstine was told to report to a Navy flight school in Pensacola, Florida, but was ultimately discharged into the Navy reserves, and went on to obtain pilot credentials at a private flight school in Alabama. Burnstine later moved to Fort Lauderdale, Florida, where he set up Florida Air International, which was involved drugs and arms smuggling. In the 1960s Burnstine financed the construction of the "landmark" KenAnn Building in Wilton Manors, Florida, named for himself and his first wife Ann; an 8-storey circular building, it was inspired by The Jetsons.

In January 1974 a pet lioness of Burnstine's escaped his property in Fort Lauderdale and attacked a child. Also in 1974, Burnstine won the Reno Air Races in a North American P-51 Mustang.

In December 1974 Burnstine was arrested and charged with drug smuggling, with federal agents noting that three Lockheed Model 18 Lodestar aircraft that crashed with drugs on board in Florida in 1974 had been traced to Burnstine's leasing company. His P-51 crashed before he was indicted in February 1975, and became an informant in several drug cases, including one involving Mitchell WerBell III.

The biography, Unlimited: The True Story of Kenneth Burnstine, by author Greg Born, was published on October 6, 2026.
