= Château du Bernstein =

Ruined castle in Bas-Rhin, Grand Est, France

Coordinates: 48°19′19″N 7°23′59″E

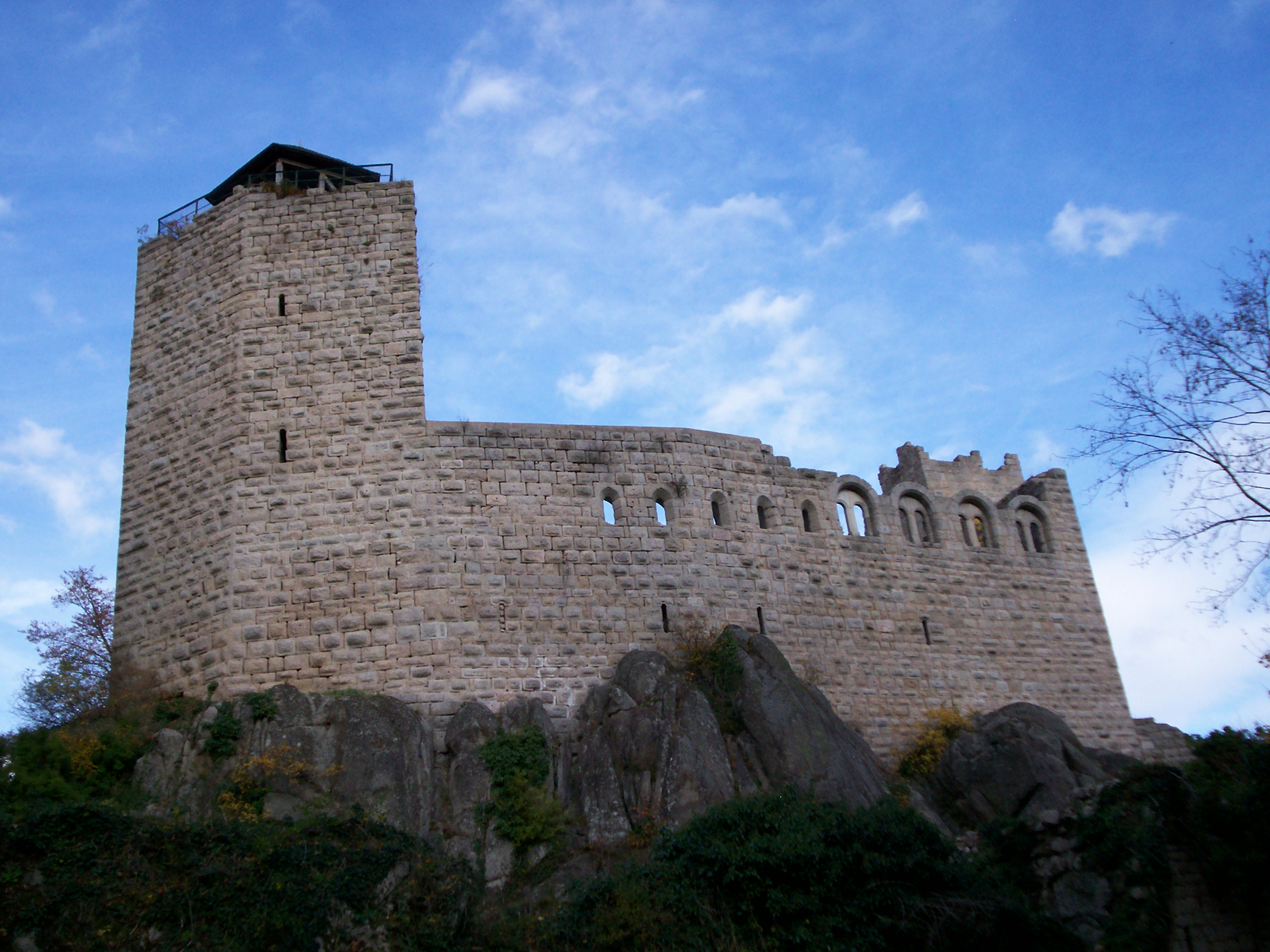
Château du Bernstein

The Château du Bernstein (French pronunciation: [ʃato dy bɛʁnʃtain]) is a ruined castle in the commune of Dambach-la-Ville, in the Bas-Rhin département of France. It is situated at an altitude of 557 metres (1,827 ft).

Originally, the castle belonged to the Counts of Eguisheim Dabo. After the siege of 1227, it became the property of the bishop of Strasbourg and seat of the episcopal bailiffs until 1580. Abandoned from this date, the buildings fell into ruin.

== History ==
The castle at Bernstein is among the oldest in Alsace. It was first mentioned at the beginning of the 11th century, though the northern surrounding wall can be dated to prehistoric times. The upper castle with keep, manor house and advanced works probably dates from the end of the 12th century and start of the 13th. In the Gothic era, the manor house was separated from the keep by a ditch, transformed later into a cistern. Towards the end of the 15th century, the St. Marguerite tower, so called from the name of the chapel there, was built in the rear courtyard. Around 1835, Félix Dartein cleared the ground of the lower castle to build a house and some outbuildings which have disappeared.

The remains visible today date from several eras:

- 13th century: keep, lodging, chapel-tower, outbuildings
- 15th century: lower curtain wall, entrance gate, underground well

The Château du Bernstein is state property and has been listed as a monument historique by the French Ministry of Culture since 1931.

== See also ==
- List of castles in France
