= Rosalie Bernstein =

Rosalie Bernstein (Madame Bernstein) also known as Rosalie Ochse (Madame Ochse) and Madame Rosalie, née Pfahl (1831–1907), was a British businesswoman, fashion merchant and pimp. She was a dress lodger, who equipped prostitutes with fashionable clothing and introduced them for wealthy clients, until the women could pay their debts to her. She later became a successful fashion merchant with royal clients.

== Life and career ==
Rosalie Pfahl was married to Mr. Bernstein, who owned a tobacco shop in Piccadilly in London's West End. She inherited the tobacco show from her late husband, and expanded it to a so-called fancy shop, where she sold and rented out accessoirs, bijouteries, artificial flowers, elegant furniture, second hand fashion clothning, hats and other products necessary to appear as a fashionable person. In 1866, she remarried the Prussian fashion merchant Charles Ochse and called herself Madame Ochse.

Her speciality was to equip prostitute women, who wished to become courtesans (high class prostitutes) with the clothing and accessors necessary for them to work in this level of the sex trade, since courtesans were expected to dress in the manner of upper class ladies. The women were not able to pay for clothing of that kind. Bernstein had contacts in the West End, which was the pleasure district of the upper class, and introduced the women she had equipped with elegant clothing to prospective rich clients in the casino's and dance halls of the Haymarket of West End, acting as their pimp until the women were able to pay of their debts to her.

Rosalie Bernstein was a prominent example of the category of dress lodger-pimps and made a fortune on her business. She held dinners in her home on Sloane-Street for women indebted to her and their prospective male upper class clients. When one of the men choose a woman to become his kept mistress, Bernstein sold the furniture and other gifts the man bought to equipp the house they bought to their mistress. She was in fact a pimp with a "fleet" of prostitutes, but since she did not own an actual brothel but technically just collected debts, she was able to avoid any legal difficulties of being a madam.

The famous courtesan Kate Cooke Walsh, who married Henry James Fitzroy, Earl of Euston in 1871, was one of the courtesans whose career she launched in 1864. In 1869–1870 there was a legal process between Kate Walsh and Rosalie Bernstein (represented by her husband), who sued Walsh for unpaid debts, but lost the case since Kate Walsh created a scandal by proving that Bernstein had sold her products intended to help her launch her career as a sex worker, which by law made her debts void.

In 1877, Bernstein launched a new career and opened a new fashion shop on Regents Street under the name Madame Rosalie. She made regular trips to Paris to study fashion. Her shop specalized in fashionable lingerie and accessoires and became a successful merchant with clients among both courtesans and upper-class women; in 1883, she was able to list Princess Helena and Empress Eugenie de Montijo among her clients.

Speculation has suggested her as the unidentified "French Lady" or West End brothel keeper associated with the Jack the Ripper victim, Mary Jane Kelly, but this is mere speculation.
