= Ignatius Bernstein =

- Born: 1846; Kremenetz, Volhynian Governorate, Russian Empire
- Died: 5 July 1900 (aged 53–54); Between Harbin and Chabarovsk
- Education: St. Petersburg Institute for Engineers
- Occupation: Railroad engineer
- Spouse: Polina Rabinovich
- Children: Sergey Bernstein; Alexander Ivitch

Ignatius Abramovich Bernstein (Russian: Игнатий (Ицко-Исаак) Абрамович Бернштейн, Yiddish: יצחק־אייזיק בן אברהם בערנשטיין) was a railroad engineer and activist in the Russian Empire.

== Biography ==
Ignatius Bernstein was born in Kremenetz, Volhynian Governorate, in 1846. He was educated at the high school of his native town, and at the St. Petersburg Institute for Engineers, from which he graduated.

In the 1880s, while yet a student, he was received by the czar as a delegate from many Jewish families who petitioned for a restoration of their right of settlement outside the Pale of Settlement. He was instrumental in convincing the Russian leader to grant their request.

After serving as assistant district engineer on various railroads, Bernstein was in 1896 appointed first engineer at Vladivostok, and in the following year was sent to Tzitzikar, where he was given the direction of the fifth district of the Chinese Eastern Railway. On July 2 he sailed for Chabarovsk on the steamship "Odessa". When the vessel was three days out it was attacked by Chinese Boxers, who killed thirteen of the passengers, Bernstein being one of the victims. A memorial service was held August 19 in the Great Synagogue of St. Petersburg.
