= Georg Heinrich Bernstein =

German orientalist (1787–1860)

Georg Heinrich Bernstein (January 12, 1787 – April 5, 1860) was a German orientalist.

== Biography ==
He was born at Cospeda, near Jena. He studied at the universities of Jena, Leipzig, and Göttingen, and in 1812 became an associate professor of oriental literature at the University of Berlin. In 1820, he was appointed a full professor at the University of Breslau. He died in Lauban.

== Research ==
He made numerous journeys to the great libraries of Europe, visiting Oxford, London, Cambridge, Florence, Rome, Naples, and Venice, and gathering scientific material drawn chiefly from manuscript sources. His greatest philological activity was displayed in the publication of Syriac texts, the most noteworthy being the Syrische Chronik of Bar Hebraeus (1822) and portions of the same author's Horreum Mysteriorum (Treasury of Secrets; 1858).

In the domain of Arabic literature, he is known for his edition of an ode of Safi al-Diṇ (1816). He also published a new and entirely revised edition of Georg Wilhelm Kirsch's Chrestomathia Syriaca (1832–36), which was long used as a textbook at universities. It was Bernstein's intention to publish an elaborate Syriac dictionary (Lexicon linguae Syriacae), of which, however, only the first part appeared (1857).
