= Robert A. Bernstein =

American politician (born 1961)

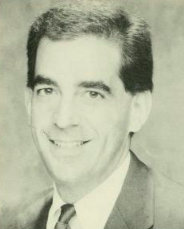

Member of the Massachusetts Senate from the First Worcester District
- In office 1995–2001
- Preceded by: Arthur E. Chase
- Succeeded by: Harriette L. Chandler

Personal details
- Born: March 22, 1961 (age 65) Worcester, Massachusetts
- Party: Democratic
- Education: Franklin & Marshall College; Georgetown University Law Center
- Occupation: Attorney; Politician

Robert A. Bernstein (born March 22, 1961, in Worcester, Massachusetts) is an American attorney and politician who represented the First Worcester District in the Massachusetts Senate from 1995 to 2001.
