= Sid Bernstein (editor) =

American publisher (1907–1993)

- Born: Sidney Ralph Bernstein; 1907
- Died: 1993 (aged 85–86)

Sidney Ralph Bernstein (1907–1993) was chairman of the executive committee of Crain Communications Inc. and had previously served as founding editor and publisher of Advertising Age.

Then-23 year old Sid Bernstein was the first editor of Ad Age, and his "Con-SID-erations" column appeared until his death.

Bernstein was inducted into the American Advertising Federation's Advertising Hall of Fame in 1989.

The late Crain senior editor Fred Danzig had described the late chairman of the executive committee as "the conscience of the business in many ways," a statement seconded by Rance Crain, "son of the founder and now president of the corporation."

He authored This Makes Sense to Me: An Opinionated Editor Speaks Out.

== Career ==
A Chicago native, Bernstein began his career as a teen-age "office boy" and messenger at the company that became Crain (founded in 1916).

He used his Con-SID-erations column to make challenges in what The Times called "outspoken and sometimes outraged tones." When he thought that shipping and handling charges are at times unreasonably high, he formed a group of college students who, as a summer project, went with him to factories and attempted to purchase items at list price. He was even challenged and was asked for an S/H fee.

== Personal ==
His undergraduate education was at University of Illinois, and his MBA is from University of Chicago.

He died Saturday, May 29, 1993. "Mr. Bernstein is survived by his wife, Adele, and a son, Henry."
