= Sid Bernstein (impresario) =

American music producer and promoter

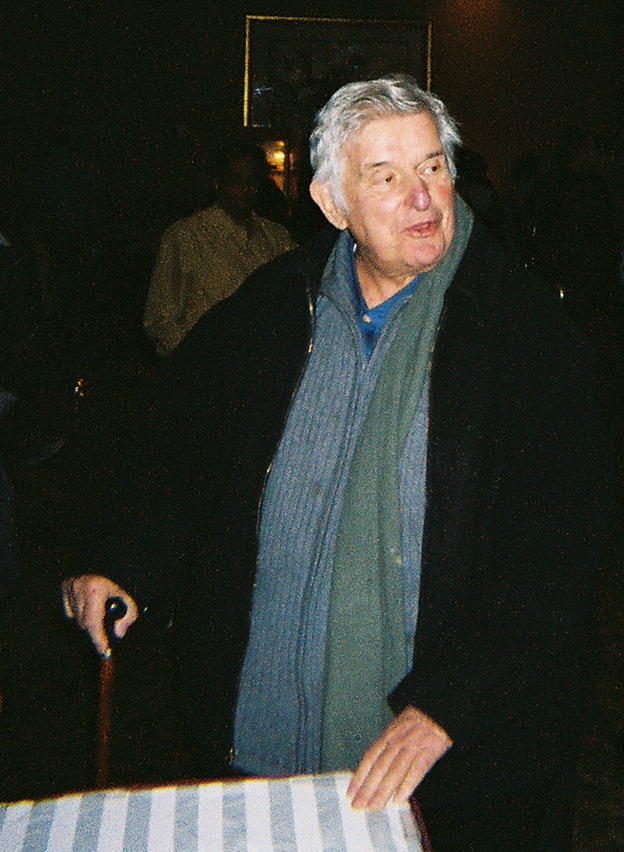
- Bernstein in 2009
- Born: Sidney Bernstein; August 12, 1918; New York City, New York, U.S.
- Died: August 21, 2013 (aged 95); New York City, New York, U.S.
- Occupations: music promoter, talent manager, author
- Spouse: Geraldine Bernstein
- Children: 6 (4 sons and 2 daughters)

Sidney Bernstein (August 12, 1918 – August 21, 2013) was an American music promoter, talent manager, and author. Bernstein changed the American music scene in the 1960s by bringing the Beatles, the Rolling Stones, Herman's Hermits, the Moody Blues, and the Kinks to America. He was the first impresario to organize rock concerts at sports stadiums.

== Life and career ==
Bernstein was born in New York City in 1918 and was adopted by a Russian Jewish family. He studied journalism at Columbia University before working in a ballroom and joining the US Army in 1943. During World War II, he was stationed in Britain and also served in France with the 602nd Anti-Aircraft Artillery Gun Battalion of the United States Army. After the end of the war he returned to New York and became the manager of mambo musician Esy Morales, as well as acting as a booking agent. He started work for the General Artists Corporation (GAC), and by the early 1960s was working as a booking agent for pop stars such as Dion and Chubby Checker.

Bernstein helped jump start the British Invasion as the first concert promoter to bring the Beatles over to the United States from Britain. An Anglophile, he contacted Beatles manager Brian Epstein in early 1963 after reading about the group in several British newspapers. Persuading Epstein that they could be successful in the US, he booked Carnegie Hall for their first appearance without informing the venue of their style of music and never hearing a note of their music. In late December 1963, the still unknown Beatles were introduced to the Tidewater area of Virginia. Almost every other song played by the area's DJs were Beatle records, accompanied by giveaways of shirts and other promotional items. By the first week of January 1964, as the Beatles were introduced to the New York City area, the same phenomenon occurred complemented by all sorts of contests and gifts. On February 12, 1964, the Beatles played two concerts at Carnegie Hall, three days following an historic appearance on The Ed Sullivan Show. On August 15, 1965, Bernstein also booked them at Shea Stadium, a show that Bernstein described as "inaudible." After a final world tour, including another Bernstein produced Shea Stadium performance, the group retired from touring in 1966 and disbanded in fall of 1970. Bernstein made many attempts to persuade them to re-form, at one point taking out full-page newspaper articles asking them to perform together for charity.

During the Beatles Shea concert, Bernstein had the phrase "the Rascals are coming!" displayed on the Shea Stadium scoreboard. "I had met the Rascals in the summer of '65 though Billy Smith (Amato) who actually discovered this group in Westhampton Long Island playing at a nightclub called the Barge. I put their name up on the scoreboard (at Shea) – 'The Rascals are coming! The Rascals are coming!' A lot of people who hadn't seen pictures of them thought they were a black group. I sensed something big about them." Brian Epstein demanded the Shea scoreboard plug be cut off before the Beatles hit the stage but that didn't stop Sid from working with the Rascals over the next five years. He helped the New Jersey–based quartet in their rise from obscurity, changing their name from "the Rascals" to "the Young Rascals" in an attempt to avoid controversy because of a similar named group.

Bernstein also brought British bands including the Rolling Stones, Herman's Hermits, the Moody Blues, and the Kinks to America. He also organized concerts for Tony Bennett, Ray Charles, Judy Garland, Frank Sinatra, Jimi Hendrix, Laura Nyro, Laura Branigan, Melanie and Sly & the Family Stone. James Brown said that Bernstein "was in the forefront of race relations" by booking African-American musicians during the 1960s. In 1964, he brought many Israeli singers to the United States for their first major concerts, among them Shoshana Damari, Shaike Ophir and Yaffa Yarkoni, who appeared at Carnegie Hall a year after the Beatles. He was the first to stage a rock show at Madison Square Garden. He teamed with Shirley MacLaine in 1972 to produce Star-Spangled Women for McGovern–Shriver in ten days – a variety show with more than 50 musicians.

In January 2006, TNT optioned Sid Bernstein's memoirs as told to Arthur Aaron to develop a two-hour television biographical film titled The Beatles in America. The project reportedly received a personal go-ahead from Paul McCartney, with Larry Block and Craig Sabin attached as writers, though the film ultimately remained unproduced.

Bernstein died on August 21, 2013, in Manhattan, nine days after his 95th birthday. He was survived by his wife Geraldine Gale; and their four sons, two daughters and seven grandchildren.

=== Books ===
Bernstein wrote or coauthored several books:

- It's Sid Bernstein Calling (Jonathan David Publishers)
- Not Just the Beatles ... (Jacques & Flusster Publishing)

=== Musical works ===
At age 93, Bernstein released his first album as a singer. Sid Bernstein Presents... is a collection of some of his favorite songs, and was released on February 14, 2012, on compact disk and as a digital download.

=== Documentary ===
Bernstein is also the subject of Sid Bernstein Presents..., a documentary film by Jason Ressler that detailed his career and life. The film made its world premiere at the DocNZ film festival in Auckland, New Zealand in February 2010.
