= Jewish community of New York City =

The New York City Jewish community is the largest urban Jewish community in the world. As of 2020, New York City is home to over 960,000 Jews across the five boroughs, representing approximately 12% of the city's total population, with nearly half residing in Brooklyn. An additional 1.9 million Jews live in the wider New York metropolitan area, comprising roughly one quarter of the American Jewish population.

== Manhattan ==
=== Upper West Side ===
The Upper West Side is a well-known and vibrant Jewish community.

==== Resurgence ====
In 1964, Rabbi Shlomo Riskin became the founding rabbi of Lincoln Square Synagogue in New York City and served in that position until 1983. Rabbi Riskin transformed the Conservative minyan into one of New York's most innovative and dynamic Orthodox communities. The synagogue became particularly well known for its pioneering outreach programs which inspired many secular people to become religiously observant Orthodox Jews. Under Rabbi Riskin's leadership, the synagogue became a highly dynamic and energetic center for the Jewish community and activity. He vastly increased engagement by young singles and young families and revolutionized the role of synagogues in creating an energized community with an active social life.

In the 1980s and 1990s the Upper West Side skyrocketed in Jewish communal activities, and became a major center of Jewish community for young adults. Various synagogues became well known for outreach, including Aish HaTorah's local congregation, Hineni under Rebbetzin Esther Jungreis, the Carlebach Shul, under Rabbi Shlomo Carlebach, and Manhattan Jewish Experience under Rabbi Mark Wildes.

==== Historic synagogues ====
Many synagogues on the Upper West Side date from prior to the renewed period of Jewish community activity which had its first beginnings in the 1960s and took root over the years, reaching prominence in the 1980s and enduring since then. Accordingly, the list below includes synagogues founded prior to 1940.

- The Jewish Center, located on West 86th Street between Columbus and Amsterdam avenues.
- Ansche Chesed founded in 1828 by a group of German, Dutch, and Polish Jews who split off from Congregation B'nai Jeshurun. It was the largest in the United States.
- B'nai Jeshurun – In 1825, Ashkenazi members left the city's first Jewish house of worship, the Sephardic Congregation Shearith Israel, beginning a trek up Manhattan that would land them on West 88th Street between West End Avenue and Broadway. The 1919 building designed by Broadway theater architect Henry B. Herts with fellow congregant Walter S. Schneider, became a must-see for boards of other synagogues then seeking to build new homes. A spiritual and demographic renaissance began in 1985, with the arrival of Rabbi Marshall Meyer.
- Congregation Habonim – founded by refugees on the first anniversary of the Kristallnacht, this congregation occupies a classic post-World War II suburban-style synagogue at 44 West 66th Street just off of Central Park West.
- Congregation Shaare Zedek (New York City) West 93rd Street, between Broadway and Amsterdam.
- Congregation Shearith Israel – the oldest Jewish congregation in what is now the United States was founded in 1654. Its landmark, 1897 building on Central Park West at West 70th Street was designed by Arnold Brunner and Thomas Tryon and incorporated elements of its first New Amsterdam sanctuary in its small chapel.
- Congregation Rodeph Sholom 83rd Street/Central Park.
- Congregation Ohab Zedek
- Kehilat Orach Eliezer
- Society for the Advancement of Judaism
- Stephen Wise Free Synagogue
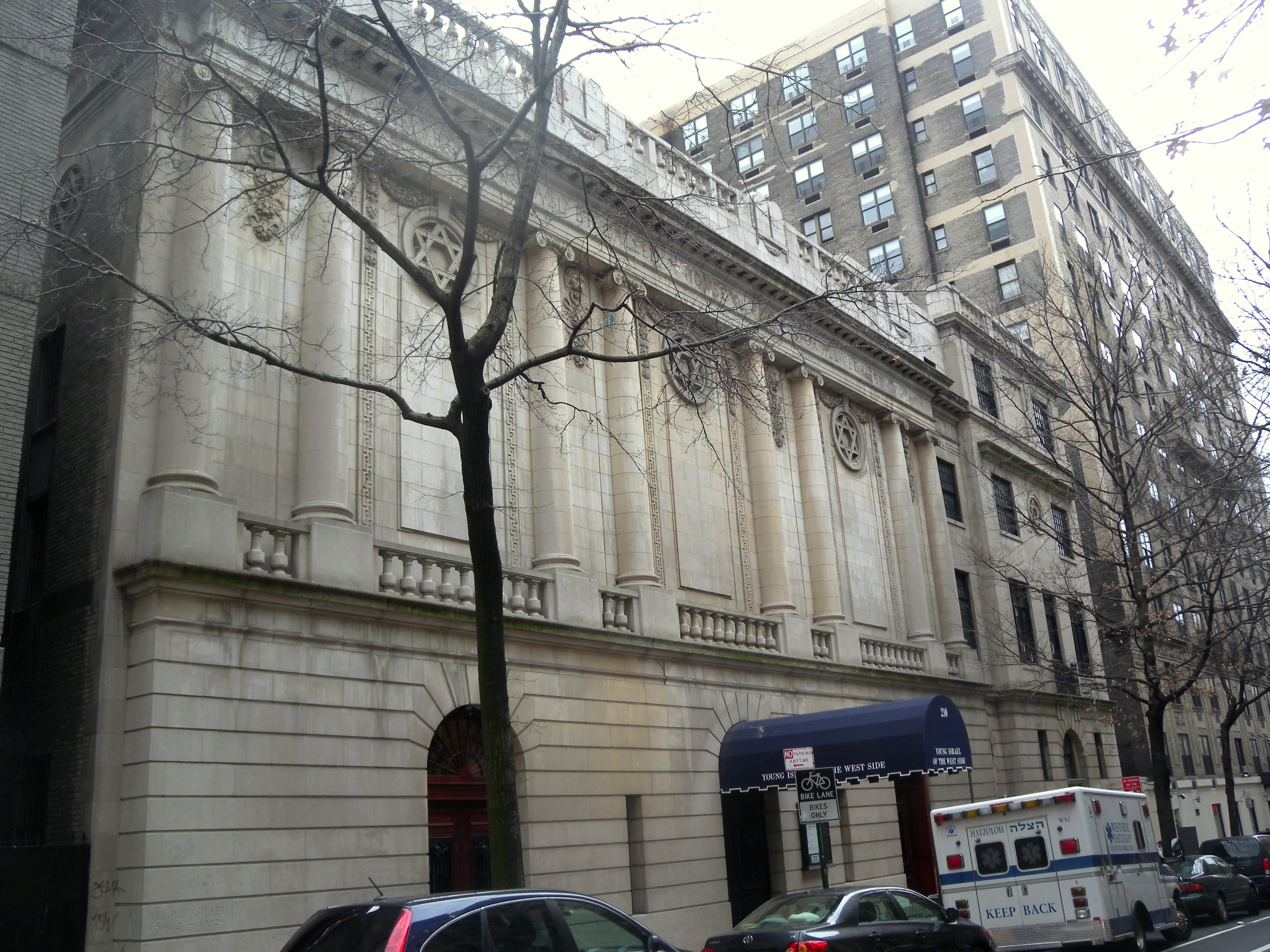
Young Israel of the Upper West Side

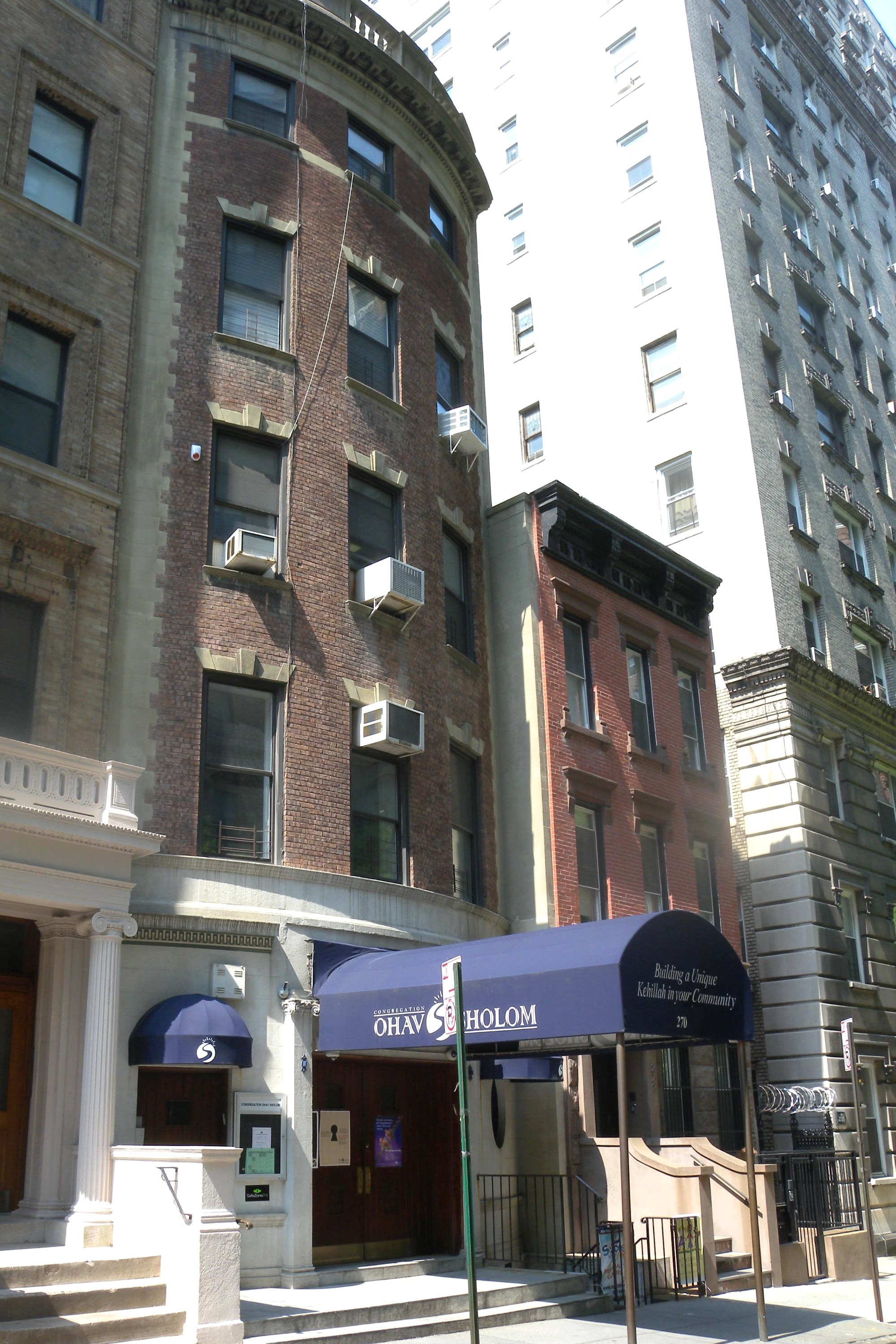
Cong Ohav Sholom

=== Lower East Side ===
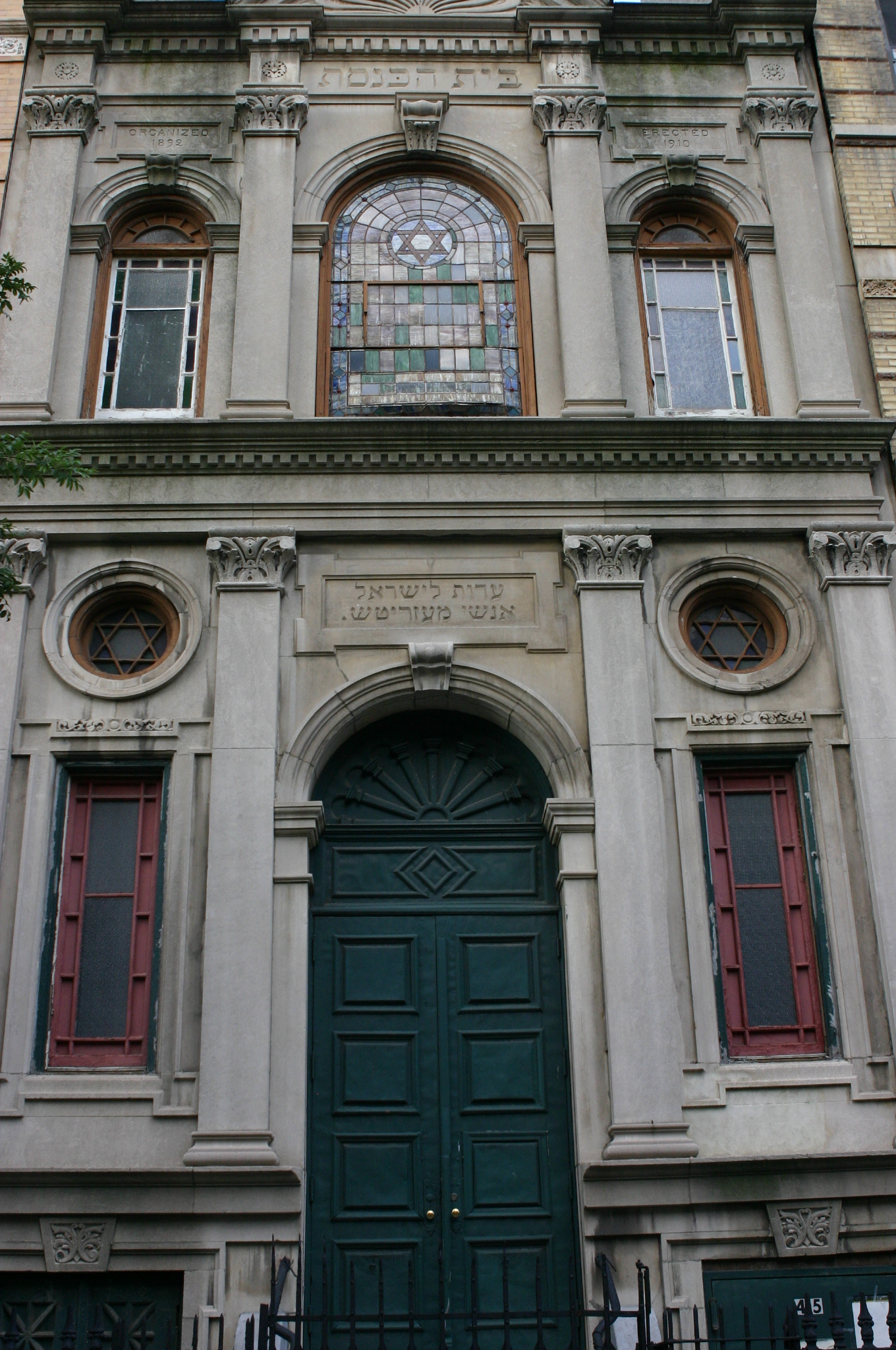
Meseritz Synagogue

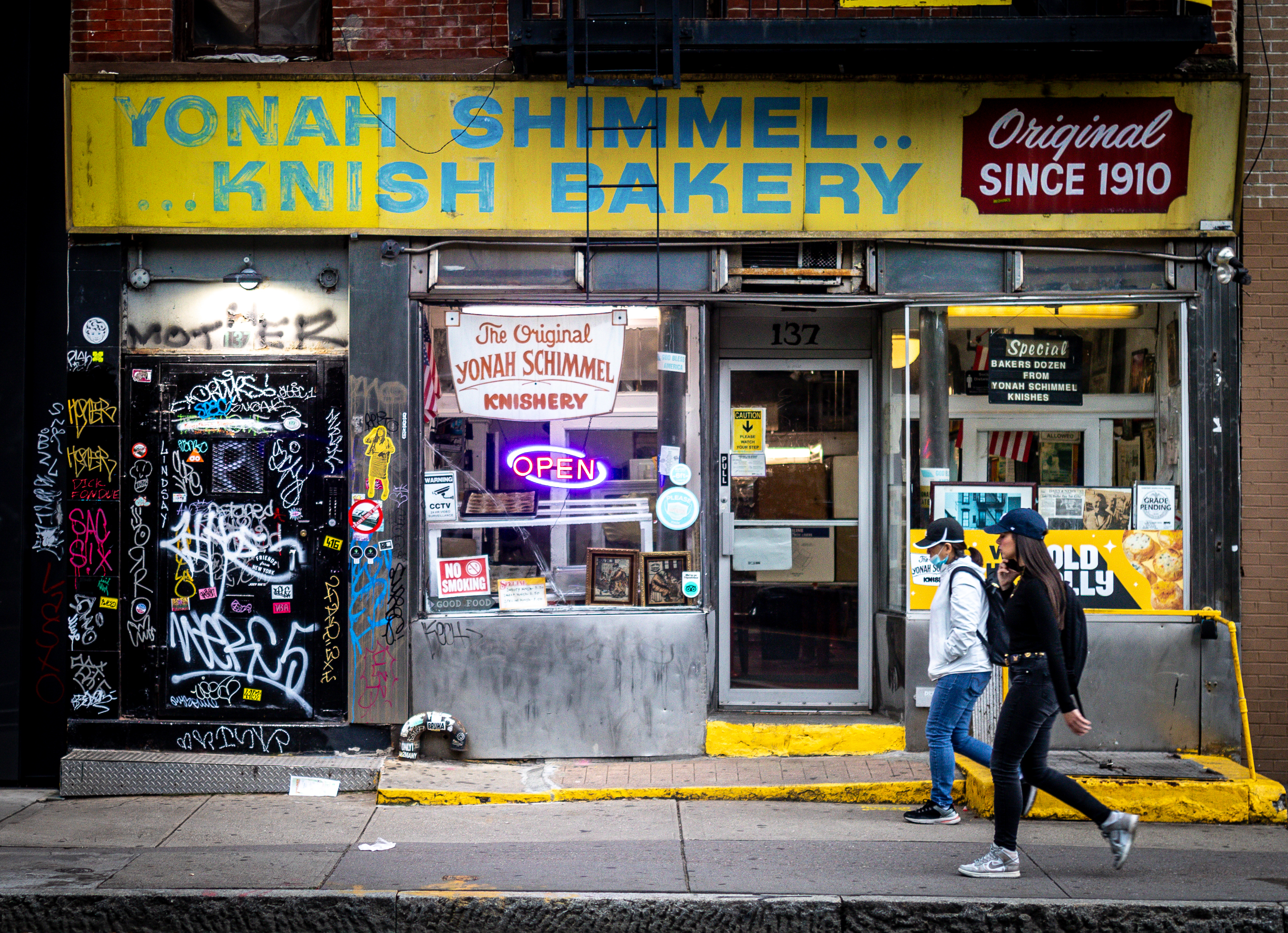
Yonah Schimmel's Knish Bakery

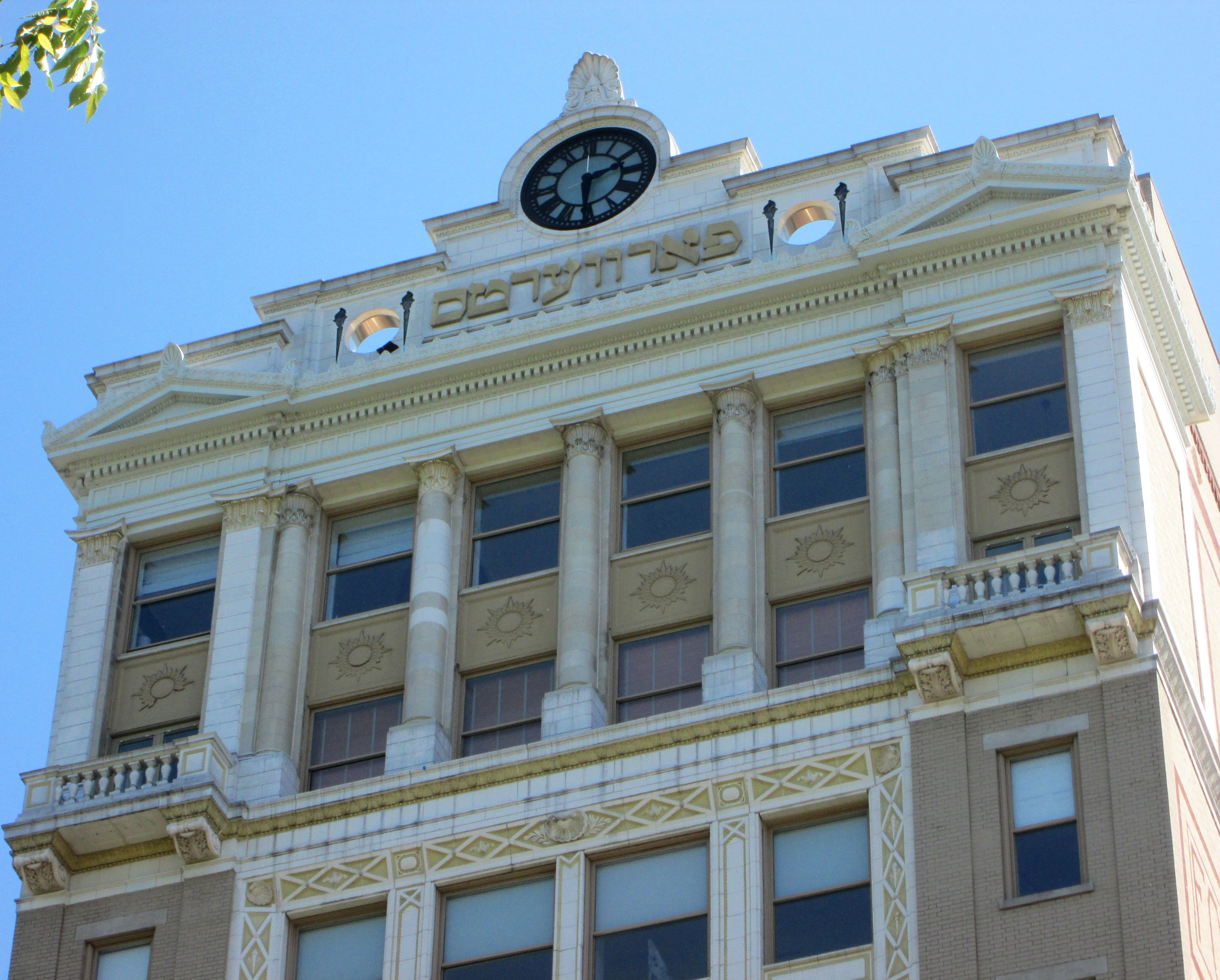
Forward Building

While the Lower East Side has been a place of successive immigrant populations, many American Jews relate to the neighborhood in a strong manner, and Chinatown holds a special place in the imagination of Chinese Americans, just as Astoria in Queens holds a place in the hearts of Greek Americans. It was a hub for ancestors of many people in the metropolitan area, and much depicted in fiction and films.

Mesivtha Tifereth Jerusalem, established in 1907, was long led by Moshe Feinstein.

In the late 20th century, Jewish communities have worked to preserve a number of buildings historically associated with the Jewish immigrant community.

==== Notable sites ====
Notable sites include:

- The Educational Alliance Settlement house – 175 East Broadway
- Henry Street Settlement – 263–267 Henry Street and 466 Grand Street
- University Settlement House – 184 Eldridge Street
- Katz's Deli – 205 East Houston Street
- Guss' Pickles – 87 Orchard Street
- Kossar's Bialys – 367 Grand Street
- Gertel's Bake Shop – formerly at 53 Hester Street from 1914 until it closed in 2007
- Knickerbocker Village – 10 Monroe Street
- Streit's Matzo Co. – 150 Rivington Street
- Yonah Schimmel's Knish Bakery – 137 East Houston Street
- Mendel Goldberg Fabrics, since 1890 – 72 Hester Street
- Harris Levy Fine Linens, since 1894 – 98 Forsyth Street
- Russ & Daughters – 179 East Houston Street
- Schapiro's Kosher Wine – Essex Street Market
- Forward Building – 173-175 East Broadway
- Jarmulowsky Bank Building – 54-58 Canal Street, 5-9 Orchard Street

==== Synagogues ====
Synagogues include:

- Adath Jeshurun of Jassy Synagogue – 58-60 Rivington Street
- Bialystoker Synagogue – 7–11 Willet Street, originally built in the Greek Revival style for the Willett Street Methodist Episcopal Church in 1826, and acquired in 1905 for the Orthodox Jewish congregation.
- Beth Hamedrash Hagadol – 60–64 Norfolk Street
- Eldridge Street Synagogue – 12 Eldridge Street
- Kehila Kedosha Janina – 280 Broome Street
- Angel Orensanz Center – the fourth-oldest synagogue building in the United States
- Congregation Chasam Sopher – 10 Clinton Street
- Congregation Chevra Kadisha Anshe Sochaczew – 121 Ludlow Street
- Meseritz Synagogue – 415 East 6th Street
- Podhajcer Shul – 108 East First Street
- Stanton Street Synagogue – 180 Stanton Street
- Boyaner kloiz at 247 East Broadway, opened in 1928 by the Boyaner Rebbe of New York

== Brooklyn ==
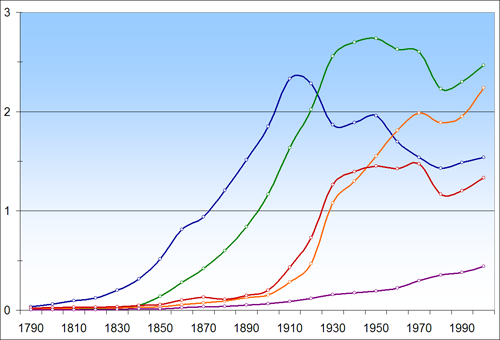
Brooklyn has been the city's largest borough since the mid-1920s. (Key: Each borough's historical population in millions. The Bronx, Brooklyn, Manhattan, Queens, Staten Island).

According to the American Jewish Population Project, Brooklyn has the largest Jewish population of any borough of New York City, with over 480,000 Jews. The borough population is 22.4% Jewish, with Jews being the predominant ethnic group in neighborhoods such as Borough Park, Williamsburg, Midwood, Ocean Parkway, a portion of Crown Heights, and a portion of Flatbush.

=== Borough Park ===
==== Jewish settlement ====
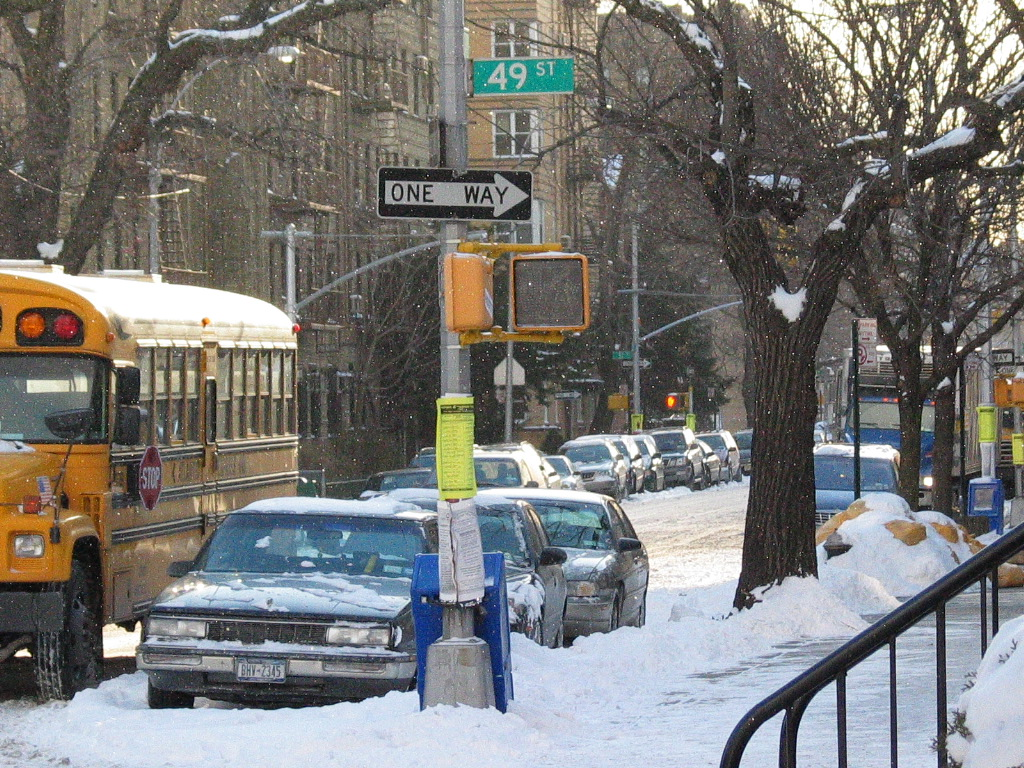
Borough Park in winter

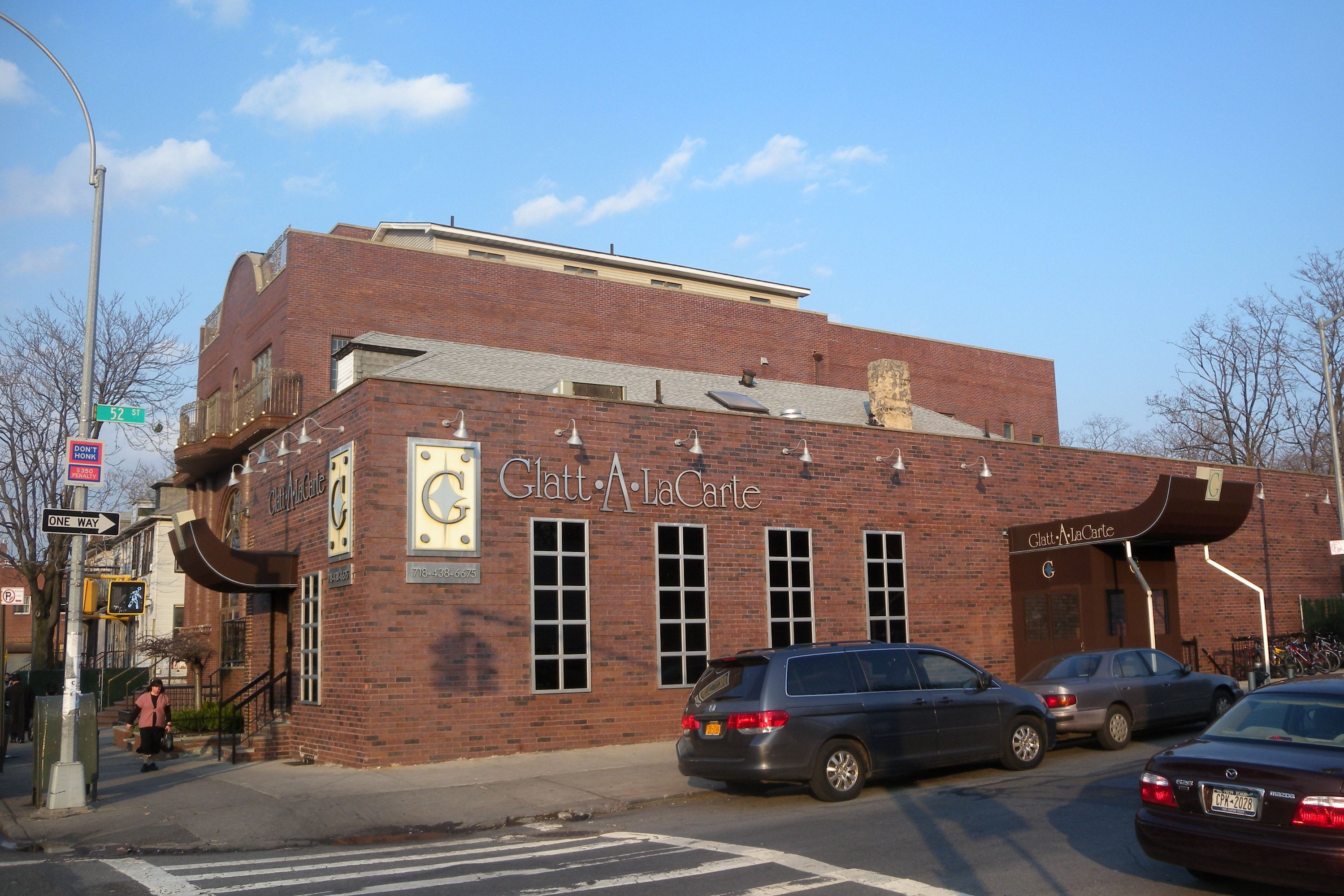
Kosher restaurant

Jewish immigrants began populating Borough Park at the turn of the 20th century, beginning in 1904–1905. By 1914, a YMHA had formed and purchased a lot on 58th Street and 14th Avenue on which to build a large facility. Through the 1930s, 13th Avenue was lined with pushcart vendors and pickle sellers. In the late 1930s, the city opened a public market on 42nd Street to force an end to the pushcart trade.

During the late 1920s and early 1930s, many Yemenite Jews emigrated from both Yemen and Mandatory Palestine (later Israel), creating their own small enclave in Borough Park. They established their own synagogue and named it Ohel Shalom. The synagogue moved from a small storefront building to 12th Avenue and 44th street when they purchased an old church.

In the 1980s, the neighborhood changed demographically — from one of Italian, Irish, and Modern Orthodox Jewish to Hasidic Jewish families. By 1983, an estimated 85 percent of the residents of Borough Park were Jewish. New shops and restaurants opened on 13th Avenue to serve the expanding Orthodox Jewish community. In 1987, two of the most popular stores debuted: Eichler's Judaica bookstore, and Kosher Castle Dairy Cafeteria. New stores also opened, selling imported goods and computer technology. At the end of the 1990s, businesses began selling electronics and Jewish books, music, and videos to overseas customers via the Internet. The area continued developing into a very large Jewish enclave around that time period.

==== "Baby Boom Capital" nickname ====
In the 2000 United States census, it was reported that an estimated 76,600 Jews lived in Borough Park. Since that time, Borough Park has grown significantly, and was given the title of "baby boom capital" of New York City by the New York Post because of the high birth rate. The population in 2011 was 140,000. The neighborhood recorded 4,523 births in 2004, the highest in the city. The closest Brooklyn neighborhood in terms of population growth was Williamsburg, home to many Satmar Hasidim, which reported 3,839 births. Borough Park's birth rate, 24.4 per 1,000 residents, has translated into growth in the neighborhood.

Many of these births occur at Maimonides Medical Center, a hospital in the Borough Park area. The Maimonides Infants & Children's Hospital of Brooklyn is fully accredited as a "children's hospital within a hospital", one of three such facilities in New York City. Here, at The Stella and Joseph Payson Birthing Center, Maimonides handles more births than any other hospital in New York State.

The size of many Hasidic families often requires larger homes, and this has fueled construction and renovation projects across the neighborhood. The majority of these projects involve larger bedrooms and kitchens. A 1998 article in The New York Times stated that, "Since 1990, the Building Department has issued more permits for private construction projects — new homes and additions — in the Borough Park area than in any other residential neighborhood in Brooklyn." These construction projects were aided with a new law passed in 1992, which established Borough Park as a special zoning district where residents could build on 65% of their lot, thus reducing the size of setbacks and backyards.

=== Crown Heights ===
The World Headquarters of the Chabad-Lubavitch Hasidic movement is located on Eastern Parkway in the Crown Heights neighborhood of Brooklyn, New York.

There are thirty-four large synagogues in the neighborhood, including the Bobov, Chovevei Torah, and 770 Eastern Parkway, home of the worldwide Lubavitch movement. There were also three prominent Yeshiva elementary schools in the neighborhood, Crown Heights Yeshiva on Crown Street, the Yeshiva of Eastern Parkway, and the Reines Talmud Torah.

The Crown Heights Chabad community's estimated size is 12,000 to 16,000. It was estimated that between 25% and 35% of Chabad Hasidim in Crown Heights speak Yiddish. This figure is significantly lower than other Hasidic groups and may be attributed to the addition of previously non-Hasidic Jews to the community. It was also estimated that over 20% of Chabad Hasidim in Crown Heights speak Hebrew or Russian. The Crown Heights Chabad community has its own Beis Din (rabbinical court) and Crown Heights Jewish Community Council (CHJCC).

Chabad hipsters is a group delineation that was noted from the late 2000s into the 2010s, a minor trend of cross acculturation of Chabad Hasidim and contemporary hipster subculture. According to The Jewish Daily Forward, a small number of members of the Chabad Hasidic community, mostly residing in Crown Heights, Brooklyn, appear to now have adopted various cultural affinities of the local hipster subculture. These members are referred to as Chabad hipsters or Hipster Hasidim.

=== Williamsburg ===
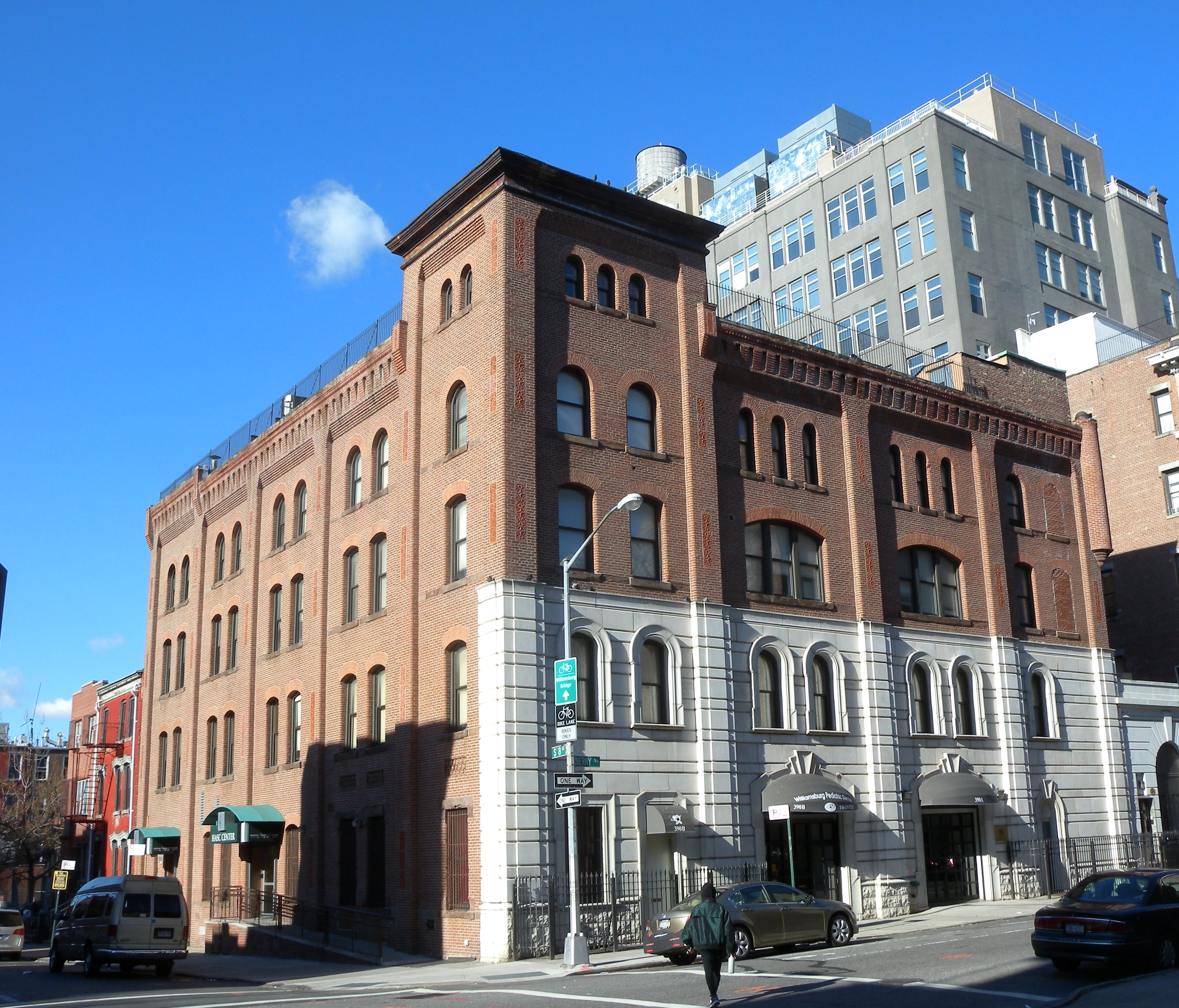
Hebrew Academy for Special Children

Williamsburg is inhabited by thousands of Hasidic Jews of various groups, and contains the headquarters of one faction of the Satmar Hasidic group. Williamsburg's Satmar population numbers about 57,000.

Hasidic Jews first moved to the neighborhood in the years prior to World War II, along with many other religious and non-religious Jews who sought to escape the difficult living conditions on Manhattan's Lower East Side. Beginning in the late 1940s and early 1950s, the area received a large concentration of Holocaust survivors, many of whom were Hasidic Jews from rural areas of Hungary and Romania. These people were led by several Hasidic leaders, among them the rebbes of Satmar, Klausenberg, Vien, Pupa, Tzehlem, and Skver. In addition, Williamsburg contained sizable numbers of religious, but non-Hasidic, Jews. The Rebbe of Satmar, Rabbi Joel Teitelbaum, ultimately exerted the most powerful influence over the community, causing many of the non-Satmars, especially the non-Hasidim, to leave. Teitelbaum was known for his fierce anti-Zionism and for his charismatic style of leadership.

In the late 1990s, Jewish developers renovated old warehouses and factories, turning them into housing. More than 500 apartments were approved in the three-year period following 1997; soon afterward, an area near Williamsburg's border with Bedford–Stuyvesant was re-zoned for affordable housing. By 1997, there were about 7,000 Hasidic families in Williamsburg, almost a third of whom took public assistance. The Hasidic community of Williamsburg has one of the highest birthrates in the country, with an average of eight children per family. Each year, the community celebrates between 800 and 900 weddings for young couples, who typically marry between the ages of 18 and 21. Because Hasidic men receive little secular education, and women tend to be homemakers, college degrees are rare, and economic opportunities lag far behind the rest of the population. In response to the almost 60% poverty rate in Jewish Williamsburg, the Metropolitan Council on Jewish Poverty, a beneficiary agency of the UJA-Federation of New York, partnered with Masbia in the opening of a 50-seat kosher soup kitchen on Lee Avenue in November 2009.

There are many households with Section 8 housing vouchers; in 2000, there were 1,394 voucher recipients in Williamsburg's nine Yiddish-speaking census tracts, but by 2014, Williamsburg had 3,296 voucher recipients within 12 Yiddish-speaking census tracts. In 2014, it was reported that Williamsburg's Jewish community had among the highest rates of applications for Section 8 housing vouchers. However, the newspaper New York Daily News doubted the legality of the applications. In 2016, the Daily News said that New York City census tracts with 30% or more of the population applying for Section 8 were present only in Williamsburg and the Bronx, except that Williamsburg's real estate, after the City of New York provided billions of dollars in tax abatements to developers, was becoming the most expensive real estate in the city.

A 2013 study by the UJA-Federation of New York identified Williamsburg as home to the second-fastest Jewish population growth in New York City, with a Jewish population of approximately 74,500 in 2011, a 41% increase from a decade earlier. Due to the neighborhood's rapid growth and high real estate prices, 77% of Jews in Williamsburg were renters, the highest rate in the city.

After the city subsidized developers in North Brooklyn, and longstanding local land owners from both North and South Williamsburg sold large blocks of land to the corporations, Hasidim have characterized the influx of new renters who had nothing to with land sales or city policy, as the artisten, or a "plague" and "a bitter decree from Heaven". Tensions have risen over housing costs, loud and boisterous nightlife events, and the introduction of bike lanes along Bedford Avenue. Although the effects of New York's development policies favoring high rise construction and luxury chain stores is increasing, many developers, such as Isaac Hager, continue to build more housing for Haredi tenants.

According to a 2024 UJA-Federation of New York survey, 74% of Jewish households in Williamsburg identified as Orthodox. The total Jewish population was an estimated 36,000 adults and 32,000 children.

=== Midwood ===
In the 1980s and 1990s, a wave of Orthodox Jews moved into the area from Borough Park, attracted by Midwood's large homes and tree-lined streets. Today, in addition to Ashkenazic Orthodox Jews, the area is home to a burgeoning Sephardic population. Along Kings Highway from Coney Island to McDonald Avenues are many Middle Eastern style restaurants and take-out food shops.

The East Midwood Jewish Center, a Conservative synagogue, was founded in 1924. The building, located on Ocean Avenue, is a 1929 Renaissance revival structure with a capacity of 950 in the main sanctuary. It was listed on the National Register of Historic Places in 2006. The Kingsway Jewish Center is an historic synagogue from the 1950s on Nostrand Avenue. It was listed on the National Register of Historic Places in 2010.

There are several branches of Touro College there, a college that was started in 1970. Midwood is also home to several large orthodox synagogues, including Congregation Beth Torah, the Young Israel of Midwood, Agudas Yisroel Bais Binyomin of Avenue L, Congregation Talmud Torah of Flatbush, Beis Medrash Ahavas Dovid Apsha under the leadership of Rabbi Shmuel Dovid Beck Shlita - The Apsha Rav, the minyan factory known as Landau's Shul (offering minyanim every 15 minutes on an average day), Rabbi Avraham Schorr's former synagogue, known as Khal Tiferes Yaakov on East 15th Street and Avenue L, the Bostoner Rebbe on Avenue J, Steinwurtzels, the Young Israel of Avenue J, the Agudah of Midwood, and several Syrian Orthodox synagogues. Synagogues based out of homes, called shtiebelach, are also common.

In November 2009, the Metropolitan Council on Jewish Poverty, a beneficiary agency of the UJA-Federation of New York, partnered with Masbia to open a kosher soup kitchen on Coney Island Avenue.

There are many yeshivos in Midwood. These include the Mirrer Yeshiva, Yeshiva Rabbeinu Chaim Berlin, Yeshiva Toras Emes Kaminetz, Mosdos Veretzky, Yeshiva of Brooklyn, Yeshiva Ohr Naftali, Yeshiva Tiferes Shmuel, Yeshivas Ohr Yisrael, Yeshivas Vyelipol, Yeshiva Ateret Torah, Yeshivat Mikdash Melech, and Yeshivas Beis Yosef Novardok.

== Bronx ==
=== Riverdale ===
Riverdale contains a highly significant Jewish community. According to UJA statistics, the community comprises 16,000 Jewish adults and 4,000 Jewish children in 10,000 households.

Local synagogues include:

- Chabad of Riverdale
- Congregation Tehillah
- Adath Israel of Riverdale
- Hebrew Institute of Riverdale
- Riverdale Jewish Center
- Riverdale Temple
- Young Israel of Riverdale
- Young Israel Ohab Tzedek
- Kehilah of Riverdale

== Queens ==
=== Kew Garden Hills ===
Kew Gardens Hills contains an established Orthodox Jewish population and some Israelis and Bukharan Jews. Kew Gardens Hills is home to the largest concentration of Afghanis in the New York metropolitan area.

There are several dozen houses of worship in Kew Gardens Hills, many of them Jewish.

Established in 1941, the Jewish Center of Kew Gardens Hills is the only traditional Conservative synagogue located in the heart of Kew Gardens Hills. By the 1950s, the Orthodox Jewish community began to take root.

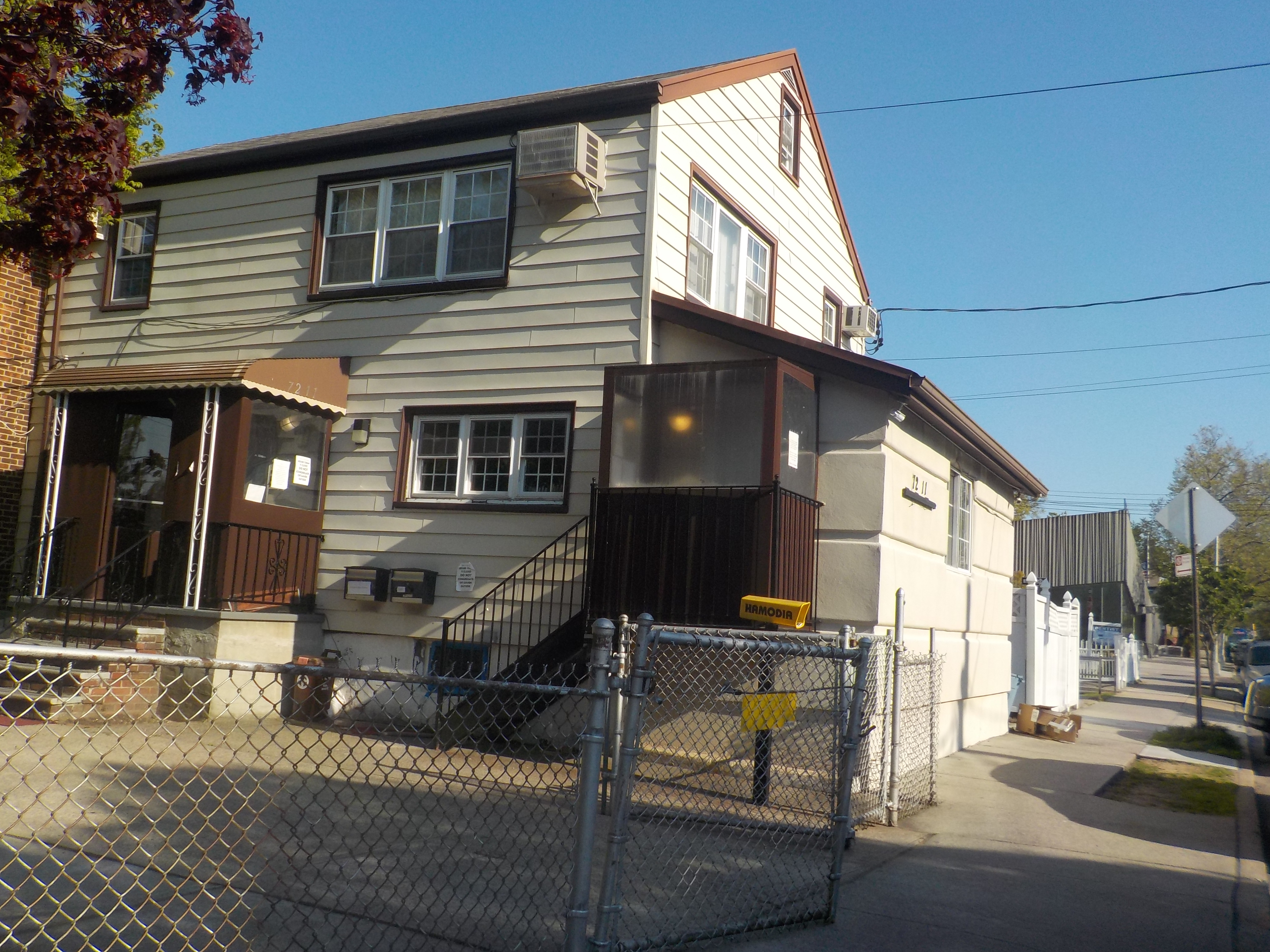
Yeshiva Keser Torah

The first orthodox Jewish synagogue was formed in 1950 on Parsons Boulevard and 78th Road when the Jewish Center of Torath Emeth was formed with Rabbi Joel Laks as the spiritual leader. The following year, the Young Israel Congregation of Kew Gardens Hills was founded in 1951 with 15 families. That congregation now consists of 450 families. Congregation Machzikei Hadas formed by Rabbi Yosef Gelernter on 73rd Avenue, is home to the first mikveh in Kew Gardens Hills. In March 1960, the City Council named a small park at Vleigh Place and Main Street as Freedom Square to commemorate the one hundredth anniversary of the birth of Theodor Herzl, founder of present-day Zionism. The Yeshivas Chafetz Chaim, Ohr Hachaim and Kesser Torah are situated in Kew Gardens Hills. Jewish elementary schools include Yeshiva Ketana of Queens and Yeshiva of Central Queens.

=== Forest Hills ===
In the 1960s, the Jewish community began to develop in Forest Hills, which then became predominantly populated by Jews who had arrived from the Bronx and Brooklyn. By 1970, the neighborhood was estimated to be two-thirds Jewish.

In the present day, Forest Hills continues to have a significant Jewish population (~36%), although it is no longer a majority; many of these are Bukharian Jews, who have had a substantial presence in the neighborhood since the 1970s, especially in the 108th Street area. As of 2011, Forest Hills also has the largest concentration of Filipinos in New York City, at 44%. Furthermore, the neighborhood also has a significant, growing Chinese population, and has been referred to as a Chinatown.

=== Rego Park ===
Like its neighbor Forest Hills, Rego Park has long had a significant Jewish population, many of whom have Georgian and Russian Jewish ancestors, and consequently there are a number of synagogues and kosher restaurants. Many Holocaust survivors settled in Rego Park after 1945. In the 1990s, Jewish immigrants from the former Soviet Union, especially from Central Asia, moved in. Most of the residents are Bukharan Jewish, and the effect of life in the Soviet Union on the population has led Rego Park to have a Russian feel, with many signs in Russian Cyrillic. Most of the Bukharan Jewish immigrants in the neighborhood come from Uzbekistan and Tajikistan, and there is also Uzbek and Tajik cuisine in many Rego Park restaurants.

=== Hillcrest and Utopia ===
Hillcrest and Utopia are adjacent and have a large Jewish community, including the synagogues below. Various population studies for Jewish communities in Queens often treat Hillcrest and Utopia as part of Flushing or as part of Fresh Meadows.

- Hillcrest Jewish Center
- Young Israel of Hillcrest

== See also ==
- History of the Jews in the United States
- History of the Jews in New York City
- List of Orthodox Jewish communities in the United States#New York
