= Brookside Cemetery (Englewood, New Jersey) =

- Interactive map of Brookside Cemetery

Details
- Established: 1876
- Location: Englewood, New Jersey
- Country: United States
- Coordinates: 40°54′21″N 73°57′59″W
- Type: Non denominational
- Size: 6 acres (24,000 m^{2})
- Website: www.brooksidecemetery.net
- Find a Grave: Brookside Cemetery

Brookside Cemetery is a historic cemetery in Englewood, New Jersey.

== History ==
It was started in May 1876, by a group of Englewood residents who purchased 6 acres (24,000 m^{2}) of land for a cemetery. The property sits on the East side of Engle Street adjacent to Tenafly, New Jersey. The cemetery was named for the brook running beside its eastern boundary. A chapel built with the local pink sandstone was erected on East Palisades Avenue and dedicated in March 1860. It was the first Presbyterian Church in Englewood and the first in Bergen County, New Jersey. It had a seating capacity of 200, and was expanded to accommodate 800 people in 1880. In 1887, the chapel was donated to the cemetery, and moved, stone by stone, to its present site near the entrance gate to the east side of the cemetery. When the chapel was moved, and reconstructed, the building was rotated and the entrance moved from the west side of the building to the east side. Mayor, and historian, Austin Nicholas Volk calls it: "One of the most beautiful cemeteries in Bergen County, New Jersey." Schuyler Warmflash refers to is as an "outdoor museum" and he wrote "[The] change of attitude — which made sites devoted to the dead reassuringly pleasant to the living — is clearly manifest in Brookside Cemetery".

== Notable interments ==
- William Weaver Bennett (1841–1912), first Mayor of Teaneck, New Jersey.
- Elbert Adrain Brinckerhoff (1838–1913), Mayor of Englewood, New Jersey.
- Philip Bosco (1930–2018), actor.
- Frank Chapman, ornithologist.
- Gerald Cardinale (1934–2021), longtime member of the New Jersey Senate for District 39
- Carole Cardinale (1937–2022), former Demarest Councilwoman and GOP Municipal Chair, wife of the late Gerald Cardinale
- Davy Force (1849–1918), baseball pioneer.
- Dody Goodman (1914–2008), actress
- Dwight Morrow (1873–1931), represented New Jersey in the United States Senate from 1930 to 1931.
- Archibald E. Olpp (1882–1949), represented New Jersey's 11th congressional district from 1921 to 1923.
- Nance O'Neil (1874–1965), American stage and silent movie actress.
- Frank C. Osmers Jr. (1907–1977), represented New Jersey's 9th congressional district in the United States House of Representatives from 1939–1943 and again from 1951–1965.
- Cullen Sawtelle (1805–1887), represented Maine's 5th congressional district from 1845 to 1847 and from 1849 to 1851.
- Robert E. Speer (1867–1947), Religious leader.
- Thomas D. Thacher (1881–1950), one-time Solicitor General of the United States.
- Edmund W. Wakelee (1869–1945), President of the New Jersey Senate and the Public Service Corporation
- George W. Wickersham (1858–1936), United States Attorney General from 1909 to 1913.
- Downing Vaux (1856–1926), landscape architect
- There is one British Commonwealth war grave in the cemetery, of a Royal Canadian Air Force Sergeant of World War II.

== See also ==
- Bergen County Cemeteries
