= Dan Currie (disambiguation) =

Dan Currie (1935–2017) was an American football player (Green Bay Packers, Los Angeles Rams).

Other people known as Dan or Daniel Currie include:

- Dan Currie (ice hockey) (born 1968), Canadian ice hockey player (Edmonton Oilers, Los Angeles Kings)
- Dan Currie (footballer) (fl. 1953–1963), Scottish football player (Clyde, Queen of the South, Scotland under-23)
- Daniel Currie (born 1989), Australian rules football player (North Melbourne)
- Daniel A. Currie (1842–1911), mayor of Englewood, New Jersey

== See also ==
- Dan Curry, title designer
