= Dan Fellows Platt =

American art collector

- Born: June 10, 1873; New York City, US
- Died: December 16, 1937 (aged 64); Englewood, New Jersey, US
- Education: Princeton University
- Known for: Art collection and Mayor of Englewood
- Political party: Democratic Party
- Spouse: Ethel Bliss Platt

Dan Fellows Platt (June 10, 1873 – December 16, 1937) was an archeologist, author, art collector and the mayor of Englewood, New Jersey, from 1904 to 1905.

== Biography ==
He was born on June 10, 1873. In the same year his family moved to Englewood, New Jersey. He graduated from Princeton University as the English Salutatorian of his class in 1895. He studied at the American School of Classical Studies in Rome before earning his Bachelor of Laws from New York Law School and Master of Arts from Princeton. He practiced law until 1900, the same year he married Ethel Bliss (a future U.S. tennis champion) and decided to devote time to studying Renaissance art. Dan and Ethel built an Italian Palazzo house named Ambercroft and made regular trips to Europe. He invested significantly in Hot Springs, Arkansas, and was part owner of both the Arlington Hotel and the Eastman Hotel there.

=== Mayor of Englewood ===
Platt entered politics in 1900 as leader of a citizen commission opposed to the installation of electric light poles. When the poles were installed, Platt took an ax and chopped down the ones in front of his property. Platt became a city councilor in Englewood in 1901. In September 1903, Platt defeated Daniel A. Currie to be the Democratic Party candidate for Mayor of Englewood, New Jersey. In the general election, he defeated Samuel J. Topping by 163 votes to become the mayor of Englewood from 1904 to 1905. Platt refused to be considered for reelection and went on a trip to Europe for the last month of his term. Between 1909 and 1916 he was on the Democratic State Committee for New Jersey serving in various roles. He was a delegate to the 1912 Democratic National Convention as a delegate for Woodrow Wilson.

=== Death ===
He died on December 16, 1937, in Englewood, New Jersey.

== Art collection ==
Dan Fellows Platt collected art for most of his adult life, beginning with Roman archaeological (coins, ancient glass, etc.) pieces in college. His early collection was focused mainly on Italian Renaissance paintings from Siena and Umbria, inspired by Princeton professor Allan Marquand. Later, particularly after World War I, Platt shifted his focus to drawings and collecting from outside of Italy. During this period, he collected work from Guercino, Luca Cambiasi, Théophile Steinlen, Alphonse Legros, John Flaxman, George Romney, and Amedeo Modigliani. In 1938, when Platt died he left the collection to Ethel for the remainder of her life and then requested that the collection go to Princeton University upon her death. In 1943, Ethel supplied the collection of drawings and renaissance paintings to Princeton University. The first public display of the collection selected 243 pieces as important for display. Platt was a recognized expert on Italian Renaissance paintings, particularly from Siena, which led to multiple lectures at colleges around the country and being named chair of the Visiting Committee of the Department of Art and Archaeology at Princeton University. It was said that his collection of photographs of art pieces was the largest in America numbering over 400,000.

== Books ==
- Through Italy with Car and Camera (1907)
- Automobiling in Europe Before the War (1916)

== Collections ==
- Dan Fellows Platt papers at Smithsonian
- Platt and DeWald Numismatic Collection at Princeton University
- Dan Fellows Platt Collection at Princeton University
