= Mohammed al Khilewi =

Saudi Arabian diplomat (born 1961)

Mohammed Abdalla al Khilewi (born 1961) is a former Saudi Arabian diplomat and millionaire noted for his May 1994 defection, in which he issued a declaration on embassy letterhead proclaiming King Fahd to be "despotic" and calling for a redistribution of the country's wealth and power.

== Background ==
Born in 1961 in Saudi Arabia, al Khilewi studied politics at King Saud University and at the Institute for Diplomatic Studies, both in Riyadh. He joined the Saudi foreign service in 1985 and rose rapidly in its ranks, becoming its First Secretary to the United Nations Mission in New York City in 1992.

== 1994 defection ==
Al Khilewi defected in May 1994, bringing with him 14,000 internal government documents depicting the Saudi royal family’s corruption, human rights abuses, and financial support for Islamist extremists, according to his lawyer, Michael J. Wildes. In particular, he claimed to have evidence that the Saudis had given financial and technical support to Hamas, a Palestinian Islamic militant organization. There was a meeting at the lawyer's office with two F.B.I. agents and an Assistant United States Attorney. "We gave them a sampling of the documents and put them on the table," Wildes told journalist Seymour Hersh, "but the agents refused to accept them." He and his client heard nothing further from federal authorities. Al Khilewi also provided copies of cable traffic revealing that the Saudi mission to the United Nations had conducted surveillance on two New York-based activist groups, the Jewish Defense League and the Jewish Defense Organization. According to Greg Palast, Al Khilewi also shared detailed information describing "the $7 billion the Saudis gave to Saddam Hussein for his nuclear program—the first attempt to build an Islamic Bomb." However, FBI agents are "ordered not to accept evidence of Saudi criminal activity, even on US soil."

Al Khilewi later sought asylum, citing threats from the Saudi royal family; Salman bin Abdulaziz, then Governor of Riyadh, reportedly summoned various members of his family and threatened them, saying "Tell your relative we can get him in the United States, we can get him even if he goes to the moon." His request was granted in August 1994, and he has since been living under cover in the New York City area.
