= Daniel A. Currie =

American politician

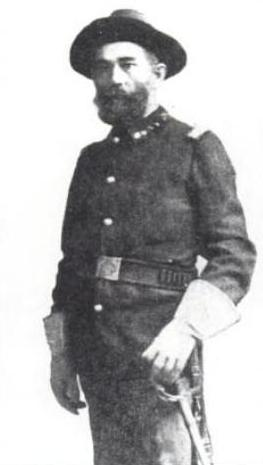
- Currie served during the Spanish–American War

Mayor of Englewood, New Jersey
- In office 1901–1903
- Preceded by: Elbert Adrain Brinckerhoff
- Succeeded by: Dan Fellows Platt

Personal details
- Born: October 10, 1842 Scarsdale, New York
- Died: February 28, 1911 (aged 68)

Daniel A. Currie (October 10, 1842 – February 28, 1911) was a physician and mayor of Englewood, New Jersey. He has been credited with serving as the first mayor of the city (starting in 1896), but that was later declared to be prior to the proper incorporation of the town; Englewood was the first incorporated town in Bergen County. Currie also served as mayor in 1901 to 1903.

== Biography ==
Currie was born in Scarsdale, New York, in 1842, to emigrants from Scotland. The youngest of ten children, he attended college at the University of Buffalo and obtained a medical degree in 1863. He practiced at first in Sullivan County, New York, and then studied for two and half years at Edinburgh University under James Young Simpson and James Syme. He returned to the United States in 1867, and first practiced in Middletown, New York, and then moved to Englewood in 1872, helping to found the Englewood Hospital and Medical Center in the 1880s. He was considered one of the prominent physicians of northern New Jersey.

In 1896, Englewood attempted to break off from Englewood Township and incorporate. A referendum passed in March 1896, and Currie was chosen as the first mayor. But the incorporation vote was voided by the New Jersey Supreme Court as based on an unconstitutional law. Englewood was not able to legally incorporate until 1899, by a special act of the state legislature. Elbert Adrain Brinckerhoff was then elected as the first official mayor. Currie served from 1901 to 1903 as mayor.

Currie also served for many years in the New Jersey National Guard, rising to the rank of Lieutenant-Colonel in that organization. He also served in the Spanish-American War.

As a physician, Currie was a primary expert witness in an 1899 inquiry into the safety of Army beef rations.

In early 1909, Currie slipped on a sidewalk causing an injury to his spine which left him ill for several months. As a representative on the town government, Currie was unable to attend any of the meetings, and over time the injury was deemed to be "fatal". Later deemed to be cancer, Currie died at his home in Englewood on February 28, 1911, following an operation to treat the disease he had been battling for over two years. His funeral procession was deemed to be the largest ever in the county, with over 1,500 people following the remains to the cemetery.
