= Mark Wildes =

American rabbi

Mark Wildes is an American rabbi and author who is known for his Jewish outreach work on Manhattan's Upper West Side.

== Early life and education ==
Wildes grew up in Forest Hills, Queens. Wildes earned a master's degree in international affairs from Columbia University, a Juris Doctor degree from Benjamin N. Cardozo School of Law, and rabbinic ordination from Yeshiva University. He is the son of immigration attorney Leon Wildes and the brother of Englewood, New Jersey, mayor Michael Wildes.

== Career ==
In 1998, Wildes founded the Manhattan Jewish Experience, an outreach organization geared to Jews in their 20s and 30s who are unaffiliated but are interested in studying Jewish texts and learning Modern Orthodox Jewish rituals. Wildes noted that in the internet age with many distractions, relationship building has become more challenging. He organized an event nicknamed an 'apology-fest' to facilitate improving relationships. His 2018 book Beyond the Instant recommended "doing what is right rather than what is popular". His group facilitated 382 couples meeting and marrying. His book The 40 Day Challenge addressed how to find meaning in the Jewish High Holidays by preparing from the beginning of the month of Elul. His interfaith lecture series connected Muslim and Christian clergy with his Jewish members. Wildes praised interfaith and citizen efforts to repair damage after antisemitic vandalism and attacks.

After the October 7 attacks and subsequent war, Wildes said the purpose of Israel's defending its borders is "to be able to live and to celebrate our Judaism", adding, "We still believe that there's goodness in the world." He noted an "increased urgency" among attendees of his program who were connecting to Israel more than they did previously. Wildes commented that rising antisemitism after the attacks "exposed a raw nerve among assimilated American Jews".

== Selected publications ==
- Beyond the Instant: Jewish Wisdom for Lasting Happiness in a Fast-Paced, Social Media World, Skyhorse Publishing, 2018. ISBN 978-1510731851
- The 40 Day Challenge: Daily Jewish Insights to Prepare for the High Holidays, Kodesh Press, 2021. ISBN 978-1947857674
- "When It Comes To Dating, Chats Beat Apps Every Time", The Forward
- The Jewish Experience: Discovering the Soul of Jewish Thought and Practice, Maggid, 2025. ISBN 9781592-647125
