= Charles William Floyd Coffin =

American politician

Charles William Floyd Coffin (May 1, 1888 – August 2, 1968) was the Mayor of Englewood, New Jersey and chairman of the board of Franklin Balmar of Baltimore, Maryland.

He was born in Pentwater, Michigan to Joel S. Coffin, Sr. and Harriet Whittington (?-1939). He had a brother, Joel S. Coffin, Jr. (1891-1941).

Coffin's family moved to Franklin, Pennsylvania and he graduated from the high school in 1907. He graduated from Cornell University in 1912. He married Eva Colorado Proudfoot (1888-1944) on January 3, 1914, in Baltimore, Maryland and they had as their children, William Allison Coffin (1915-?), Charles Floyd Coffin (1918-2005), and Eva Sawtelle Coffin (1923-1967).

Coffin was elected Mayor of Englewood, New Jersey in November 1941 and assumed office on January 1, 1942.

He died in Englewood Hospital in Englewood, New Jersey.
