= Leon Wildes =

American lawyer (1933–2024)

- Born: March 4, 1933; Pennsylvania
- Died: January 8, 2024 (aged 90)

Leon Wildes (March 4, 1933 – January 8, 2024) was an American lawyer who was the founder and a senior partner of the New York City-based immigration law firm, Wildes & Weinberg P.C., which maintains offices in New York City, Englewood, New Jersey, and Miami. He specialized in immigration law.

== Early life and education ==
Born and raised in Pennsylvania where he was an honor graduate of Olyphant High School, Wildes received his bachelor's degree in New York magna cum laude from Yeshiva College. His brother Jerry (Jerome) Wildes served in the United States Air Force and then attended medical school. Leon was awarded J.D. and Ll.M. degrees from the New York University School of Law. He served on the Yeshiva College Board of Overseers and was Treasurer of the Yeshiva College Board.

== Career ==
In 1959, Wildes served as a Migrations Specialist with the Hebrew Immigrant Aid Society, where he concentrated his efforts on issues in U.S. immigration and refugee law. He served on the Board of Directors of HIAS as an Honorary Director.

In 1960 Wildes opened his law office, Wildes & Weinberg P.C., concentrating in the field of U.S. immigration and nationality law.

Wildes was awarded the Edith Lowenstein Award for Outstanding Contributions in the Field of Immigration Practice and the Elmer Fried Prize for Excellence in Teaching Immigration Law. Wildes served as an adjunct professor of law at the Benjamin N. Cardozo School of Law, where he originated the immigration law course and has guided Cardozo's active participation in the immigration law field since. Wildes also founded an Immigration Law Externship Clinic through which students work on immigration cases for a variety of non-profit organizations under the supervision of immigration attorneys.

Wildes garnered much acclaim for his successful representation of former Beatle John Lennon and his artist wife, Yoko Ono, in their deportation proceedings instituted by the Nixon administration. Wildes contributed five full law review articles on the subject of developments in U.S. immigration law which resulted from his handling of the Lennon case. While working on the Lennon case, he discovered the government's unpublished practice of granting deportable aliens non-priority status to avoid their removal in sympathetic cases. He has guided the development of this remedy in the law, later referred to as Deferred Action or Prosecutorial discretion. This program allows law-abiding individuals to remain in the United States and avoid deportation if they are elderly, seriously ill, or undergoing severe hardship.

Wildes served as national president of the American Immigration Lawyers Association in 1970. Wildes' clientele includes many high-profile clients, notably John Lennon and Yoko Ono, whom he successfully represented in deportation proceedings from 1972 to 1976.

Wildes co-produced Mark St. Germain's off-Broadway play "Ears on a Beatle" depicting the surveillance of John Lennon by the FBI at the time. Wildes also appeared alongside his clients in many press conferences and was interviewed with Lennon by Tom Snyder on The Tomorrow Show, and he appears in the documentary The U.S. vs. John Lennon, which focuses on this period of Lennon's life.

Leon Wildes and his son Michael were recognized by Super Lawyers Magazine in 2020.

Wildes published numerous articles in the immigration field from 1959 and lectured broadly to lawyers for the Practising Law Institute, the New York State Bar Association, and the American Immigration Lawyers Association. He testified before Congress on immigration legislation on numerous occasions from 1970, representing the Association of Immigration & Nationality Lawyers, the recognized national bar association of lawyers in the immigration and nationality field. He contributed law review articles to the San Diego Law Review, Cardozo School of Law Law Review, and the Brooklyn Law Review on subjects relating to U.S. Immigration Law.

The Lennon Case: Law Review Journal Archive

- Wildes, Leon. "United States Immigration Service v. John Lennon: The Cultural Lag." Brooklyn Law Review, Vol. XL NO. 2 Fall, 1973.
- Wildes, Leon. "The Nonpriority Program of the Immigration and Nationalization Service Goes Public: The Litigative Use of the Freedom of Information Act." San Diego Law Review, Volume 14, Number 1, December 1976.
- Wildes, Leon. "The Operations Instructions of the Immigration Service: Internal Guides or Binding Rules?" San Diego Law Review, Volume 17, Number 1, 1980.
- Wildes, Leon. "The Need for a Specialized Immigration Court: A Practical Response." San Diego Law Review, Volume 18, Number 1, 1980.
- Wildes, Leon. "The Deferred Action Program of the Bureau of Citizenship and Immigration Services: A Possible Remedy for Impossible Immigration Cases." San Diego Law Review, Volume 41 No. 2 Spring 2004.

== Death ==
Wildes died on January 8, 2024, at the age of 90 after suffering a series of strokes. His survivors included his sons Michael and Mark.
