= Paul T. Fader =

American lawyer

36th Mayor of Englewood, New Jersey
- In office January 1, 1998 – January 1, 2003
- Preceded by: Donald Aronson
- Succeeded by: Michael Wildes

Personal details
- Born: May 14, 1959
- Died: December 11, 2017 (aged 58)
- Party: Democratic
- Spouse: Jill Morgan Fader
- Children: Jack, Lucas, Morgan and Sydney
- Education: Rutgers University; William Paterson University
- Profession: Attorney

Paul T. Fader (May 14, 1959 – December 11, 2017) was a partner and member of Florio Perrucci Steinhardt & Fader, LLC.

== Professional career ==
=== New Jersey Governor's Office ===
In 2003, New Jersey Governor James E. McGreevy tapped Paul to serve as Director of the Authorities Unit and Deputy Chief Counsel. As the Director of Authorities Unit, Paul worked as the New Jersey Governor’s liaison to the State of New Jersey’s 53 independent authorities, boards and commissions, which include the Port Authority of New York and New Jersey, the Sports and Exposition Authority, the Casino Reinvestment and Development Authority, and the Economic Development Authority. Paul superintended more than 44,000 employees, and an annual aggregate revenue stream exceeding $14 billion. In 2004, Paul was asked to serve as Chief Counsel to then Governor James E. McGreevey.

Upon on the resignation of James E. McGreevey as Governor and his replacement by Richard J. Codey as acting Governor of New Jersey, Paul was asked to serve as Codey's Chief Counsel and provide legal counsel to, and representation for, the Governor of the State of New Jersey on a daily basis pertaining to issues involving all aspects of state governance. While serving as Chief Counsel to Governor Codey, Paul spearheaded the Governor's initiative to establish a new stadium in the Meadowlands for both the New York Giants and New York Jets, the first multi-professional football sports stadium.

In 2014, Paul was ranked one of the top ten Lawyer-Lobbyists in the State of New Jersey in the New Jersey Law Journal Legal Almanac.

In the fall of 2014, Paul was appointed General Counsel to the Utility & Transportation Contractors Association of New Jersey.

=== Mayor of Englewood, New Jersey ===
Paul served two consecutive terms as Mayor of Englewood, New Jersey. Paul was elected Mayor of City of Englewood in 1997 and re-elected as Mayor in 2000. In Paul's first year in office he led the movement to create a magnet school at Dwight Morrow High School in an effort to end years of Litigation regarding the de facto segregation. The effort ultimately culminated with the establishment of the Academies at Englewood, a prestigious regional high school program for high achievers. Englewood also received the New Jersey Future Smart Growth Award for its Downtown Revitalization and Redevelopment project.

In Paul's fourth year as Mayor, New Jersey Monthly magazine named Englewood as #1 City in which to live.

=== Democratic Party ===
Fader served as a member of executive committee and parliamentarian of the Bergen County Democratic Party. In 2006, Paul was elected as a delegate for President Bill Clinton to the Democratic National Convention. Again, in 2012 Paul was elected as a delegate for President Barack Obama to the 2012 Democratic National Convention.

== Personal life ==
Married to Jill Morgan Fader, and father of Jack, Lucas, Morgan and Sydney Fader. Fader has written extensively on law, government and other issues in several publications including the New Jersey Conference Mayors Magazine, Newark Star Ledger, 201 Magazine and the Bergen Record.

In 2009, New Jersey Monthly Magazine named Paul one of the 101 Most Influential People in New Jersey.

Fader died on December 11, 2017.

=== Charity involvement ===
Early in his career, Paul worked with the Vietnam Veterans of America and in 1984 received the Bergen County County Chapter's Citation of Appreciation for his work. Fader served as member of the board of Shelter our Sisters, Bergen County's Home for Battered Women & Children and in 1996 received their Citation of Appreciation.

Paul Fader and his wife Jill founded Englewood Hospital's Walk for Awareness in 1999. The Walk has helped raise over $1.4 million for The Leslie Simon Breast Care and Cytodiagnosis Center. Funds help provide mammograms and other life-saving services for uninsured and underinsured women in the communities. In addition, these funds help the hospital to secure state-of-art technology to help in the battle against breast cancer.
