= Elbert Adrain Brinckerhoff =

American politician (1838–1913)

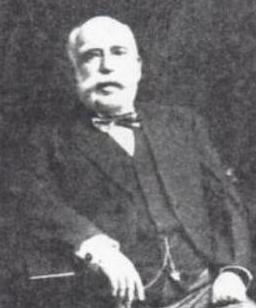

Mayor of Englewood, New Jersey
- In office 1899–1901
- Succeeded by: J.C. Anderson

Personal details
- Born: November 29, 1838 Jamaica, Queens, New York
- Died: March 23, 1913 (aged 74) Englewood, New Jersey
- Spouse: Emily Augusta Vermilye (m. 1869)
- Relations: Robert Adrain (grandfather)
- Children: 7
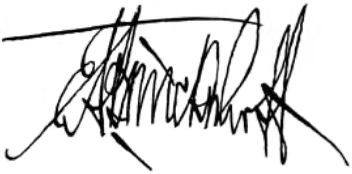
- Signature

Elbert Adrain Brinckerhoff, Sr. (November 29, 1838 – March 23, 1913) was the Mayor of Englewood, New Jersey from 1899 to 1901, and the founder of Brinckerhoff, Turner and Company. He was president of Merchants' National Bank and president of Columbia Presbyterian Hospital in New York City and vice president of the American Bible Society.

== Early life ==
He was born on November 29, 1838, in Jamaica, Queens. He was a son of Mary (née Adrain) Brinckeroff and John N. Brinckeroff, principal of Union Hall Academy in Jamaica. He was a grandson of Irish-American mathematician Robert Adrain, who is chiefly remembered for his formulation of the method of least squares.

== Career ==
In 1854, at age 16, he traveled to San Francisco aboard the Adelaide and he took a job with Wells Fargo where he delivered the first pony express package from San Francisco to Sacramento. He later joined the San Francisco Committee of Vigilance during the presidency of William Coleman. He returned to New York City in 1860.

In New York City, he became associated with Fox & Polhemus, cotton manufacturers and brokers, where he later became an owner. He later became senior member of the firm and it was renamed Brinckerhoff, Turner & Co. For many years, he also served as president of the Merchants' National Bank, president of Columbia Presbyterian Hospital, vice president of the American Bible Society and a director of the Harriman National Bank.

He was elected Mayor of Englewood, New Jersey, in 1899 and recommended an increase in the police force from seven police officers to nine police officers. He also recommended the building of the city hall.

== Personal life ==
He moved to Englewood, New Jersey, in 1867. On April 22, 1869, he was married to Emily Augusta Vermilye (1846–1921), a daughter of Col. Washington Romeyn Vermilye, a banker. They were the parents of one son and six daughters, including:

- Emily Vermilye Brinckerhoff (1870–1945), who married Frederick Smyth Duncan (1868–1953).
- Mary Elizabeth Brinckerhoff (1871–1931), who married James Douglas Armstrong (1866–1939) in 1894.
- Elbert Adrain Brinckerhoff Jr. (1874–1943), who married Edna Connor (1874–1938).
- Elizabeth Lathrop Brinckerhoff (1876–1950), who married William Bushnell Chapin (1875–1914) in 1901. After his death, she married widower Lt. Col. Frederick Butterfield Ryons (1877–1946) in 1923.
- Helen M. Brinckerhoff (1881–1953), who married Maxwell Van Buskirk (1871–1952).
- John Henry Brinckerhoff 1829-1903 was an elder cousin who was prominent in Jamaica, NY

He died in Englewood on March 23, 1913, and was buried in Brookside Cemetery there.
