= Avraham Schorr =

American rabbi

Avraham Halevi Schorr, also known as Avrohom Schorr, is a Rabbi in Flatbush, NY. He is the Rav of Congregation Nezer Gedalyahu and author of numerous works on Jewish theology. He is the son of Gedalia Schorr, former Rosh yeshiva of Yeshiva Torah Vodaas and brother of Rabbi Yisroel Simcha Schorr, current Rosh yeshiva of Ohr Somayach, Monsey and one of the General Editors of the English and Hebrew translations of Artscroll's Schottenstein Edition Talmud.

Schorr has been the compiler of Ohr Gedaliyahu. He holds a regular schedule of lectures, and has a following of about more than 100 students who learn daily "Daf Yomi", the daily learning of the Talmud. His lectures have been described By those who listen to them in person and online as "thick" with content, challenging his audience to keep pace with his multi-threaded points. His late Shabbat Evening meals are attended by hundreds of followers.

Schorr has published over 100 written works largely based on his lectures.

== Controversy ==
In February and March, 2008, Schorr was a principal organizer of a controversial rabbinical ban of a concert to be given in the Theater at Madison Square Garden by singers Lipa Schmeltzer and Shloime Gertner. The ban resulted in the concert being canceled shortly before it was to be held and after three thousand tickets had been sold.

== Seforim and books ==
- ספר הלקח והלבוב על התורה
- הלקח והלבוב::חג הפסח
- עיונים בפרשה:על בראשית - שמות
- שיחות ומאמרים: שלא נדפסו בספר הלקח והלבוב : עניני ראש השנה Author (אברהם שארר (הלוי Publisher Avraham Schorr, 2019 Length 27 pages
