= Michael Wildes =

American lawyer and politician (born 1964)

Michael J. Wildes
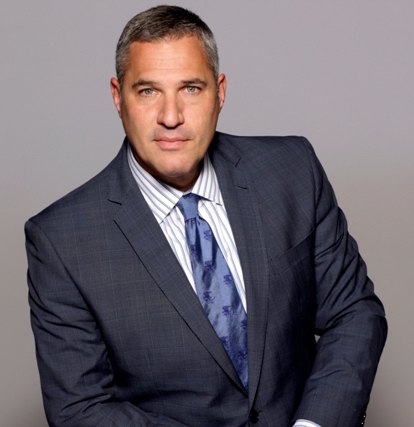

36th and 38th Mayor of Englewood
- Incumbent
- Assumed office January 1, 2019
- Preceded by: Frank Huttle III
- In office 2004–2010
- Preceded by: Paul Fader
- Succeeded by: Frank Huttle III

Member of the Englewood City Council
- In office 1998–2003

Personal details
- Born: Michael Jay Wildes; November 27, 1964 (age 61) New York, New York, U.S.
- Party: Democratic
- Spouse: Amy Messer Wildes (m. 1990)
- Children: 4
- Parent(s): Leon Wildes; Ruth B. Wildes
- Relatives: Rabbi Mark Wildes (brother)
- Education: Queens College; Benjamin N. Cardozo School of Law
- Occupation: Attorney

Michael Jay Wildes (born November 27, 1964) is an American lawyer and Democratic Party politician, serving as the 38th mayor of Englewood, New Jersey since 2018, and previously as the 36th mayor from 2004 to 2010. He was a city councilman for Englewood from 1998 until his election as mayor in 2003.

In 1989, he became a federal prosecutor for the Eastern District of New York, where he participated in several high-profile cases, including a corruption case involving former U.S. Congressman Mario Biaggi. In 1993, Wildes joined the law firm Wildes and Weinberg PC as an immigration attorney, and is now a managing partner of the firm. He works as an immigration counsel to Davidoff Hutcher and Citron LLP, and volunteers for the Lincoln Center for the Performing Arts.

== Early life ==
=== Early life ===
Wildes was born on November 27, 1964, at Mount Sinai Hospital in New York City. He was raised in Forest Hills, Queens in a Modern Orthodox Jewish home. His brother, Mark, is a Rabbi.

=== Family ===
Wildes' paternal grandfather, Harry Wildes, was a retail store owner who immigrated to the United States from Białystok, Poland, in 1920. His maternal grandfather, Max Schoenwalter, owned a paint company and escaped Nazi Germany in the late 1930s to immigrate to the United States. Schoenwalter was instrumental in the creation of the Queens Jewish Center.

Wildes' mother, Ruth Schoenwalter Wildes, was a prominent member of the Jewish community in Forest Hills, New York, where she lived and raised her family. Ruth Wildes died of breast cancer in 1995.

Wildes' father, Leon Wildes, was a lawyer from Olyphant, Pennsylvania, who studied at NYU Law School and went on to open his own law firm, Wildes and Weinberg PC, in 1960. Leon Wildes successfully defended John Lennon and Yoko Ono from a deportation attempt by the US government. In 2016, Leon Wildes wrote a book, John Lennon vs. The USA, which recounted the details of the Lennon case. Michael wrote the book's foreword. He was also a longtime professor of law at Benjamin N. Cardozo School of Law.

== NYPD ==
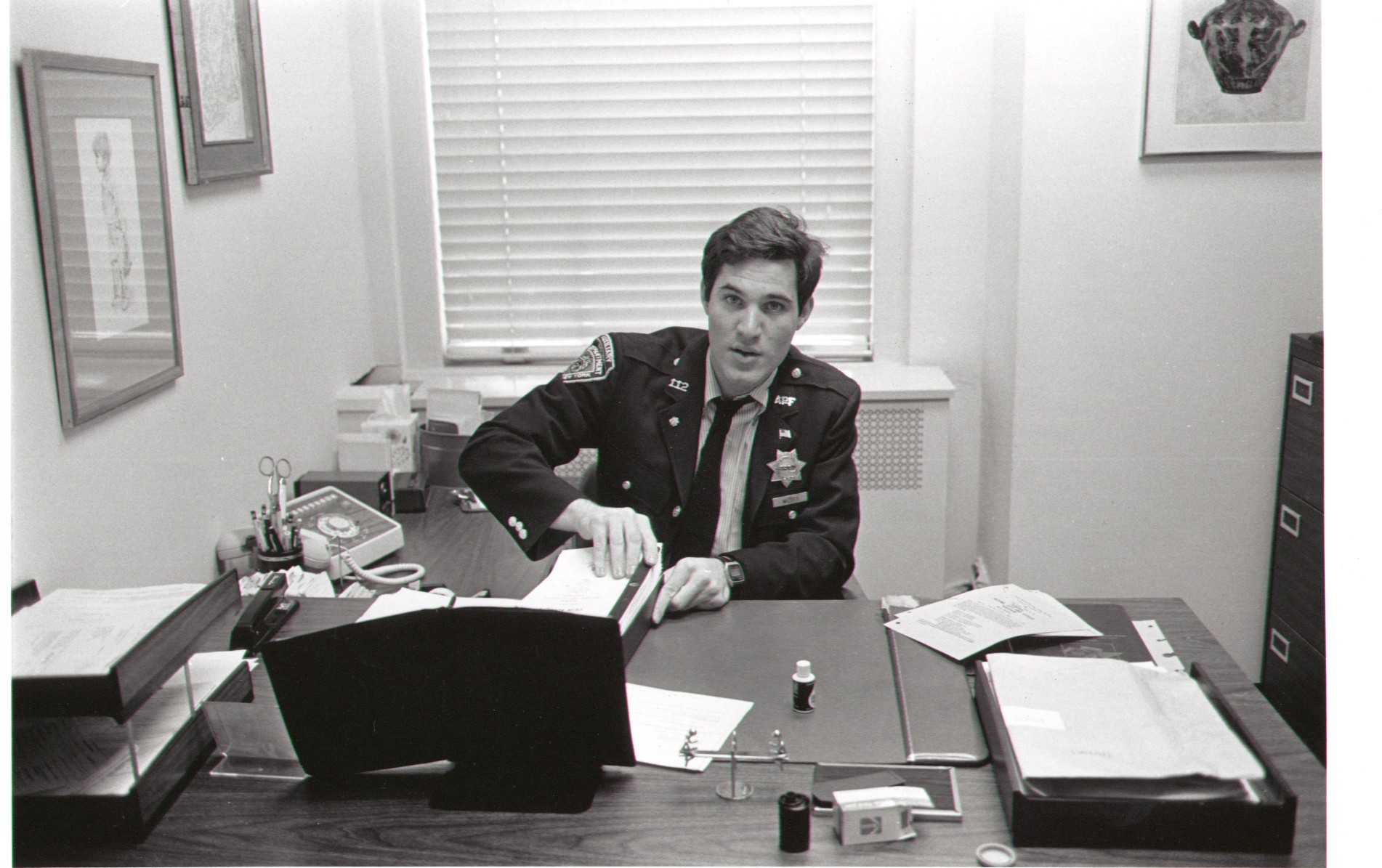
Wildes during his time as an auxiliary police officer for the NYPD, 1983

Wildes served with the New York Police Department as an auxiliary police officer from 1982 to 1992. As a member of the 112th NYPD precinct, he lectured on crime prevention and public safety in New York homes and community centers. In 1991, he resigned from the NYPD.

Wildes has served as a consultant for government agencies and institutions, including Homeland Security.

== Law career ==
=== US Attorney's Office ===
Wildes served with the United States Attorney's Office in Brooklyn from 1989 to 1993 and testified on Capitol Hill in connection with anti-terrorism legislation. He served as a Special Assistant U.S. Attorney until he retired from the U.S. Attorney's Office in 1993 to join his father's law firm.

In the late 1980s and early 1990s, Wildes was a federal prosecutor in the corruption case of former Congressman Mario Biaggi, who had been attempting to avoid paying an $872,000 corruption fine.

=== Wildes and Weinberg PC ===
Wildes joined Wildes and Weinberg PC, a law firm that specializes in immigration law, in 1993. He was made managing partner in 2010.

Some of the high-profile cases Wildes worked on included:

- Early on in his career at Wildes and Weinberg, Wildes represented Mohammed al Khilewi, a high-level Saudi Arabian diplomat who sought Wildes' counsel for his defection to the United States in 1994. Al-Khilewi had leaked thousands of documents to the FBI that described crimes against humanity, corruption, and financial support for militant Islamic groups by the Saudi royal family, and was hunted by Saudi intelligence agents who followed him to New York after he defected. Wildes obtained political asylum for al-Khilewi, who now lives in hiding in the New York City area.
- He also represented Janosh Neumann, a former Russian intelligence officer who defected to the United States in 2008.
- In 1995, Wildes represented Patricia Roush, an American mother whose two daughters had been abducted and taken to Saudi Arabia by her ex-husband. During his second visit with his two daughters in January 1986, Gheshayan, her ex-husband, kidnapped the two girls, then aged 7 and 3, and flew them to Saudi Arabia. Roush petitioned the United States Department of State for nine years in an attempt to bring her daughters back to America, but was ultimately unsuccessful. Wildes negotiated a deal with Saudi diplomats that allowed Roush to visit Saudi Arabia on a visa, and allowed her to visit her children in Riyadh. She was allowed to see her children for two hours during her trip in 1995.
- In 1997, Wildes represented Hani al-Sayegh, a Saudi Arabian citizen who had been wrongfully accused of involvement in the 1996 Khobar Towers bombing. Al-Sayegh was deported back to Saudi Arabia in October 1999, and was allegedly beheaded immediately after arriving. In 2006, a U.S. court found Iran and Hezbollah Al-Hejaz guilty of planning and carrying out the Khobar Towers bombing.
- In 2003, Wildes represented Kwame James, who became known as "the shoe bomber hero" after subduing Richard Reid, the perpetrator of the 2001 shoe bomb plot. Although James was hailed as a hero by American media and politicians, he was not an American citizen and therefore could not remain in the United States. James, a dual citizen of Canada and Trinidad and Tobago, was promised a work visa by the United States Immigration and Naturalization Service (INS), although he never received one. James became a legal resident of the United States in 2003 and a U.S. citizen in 2010, thus holding citizenship in three different countries.

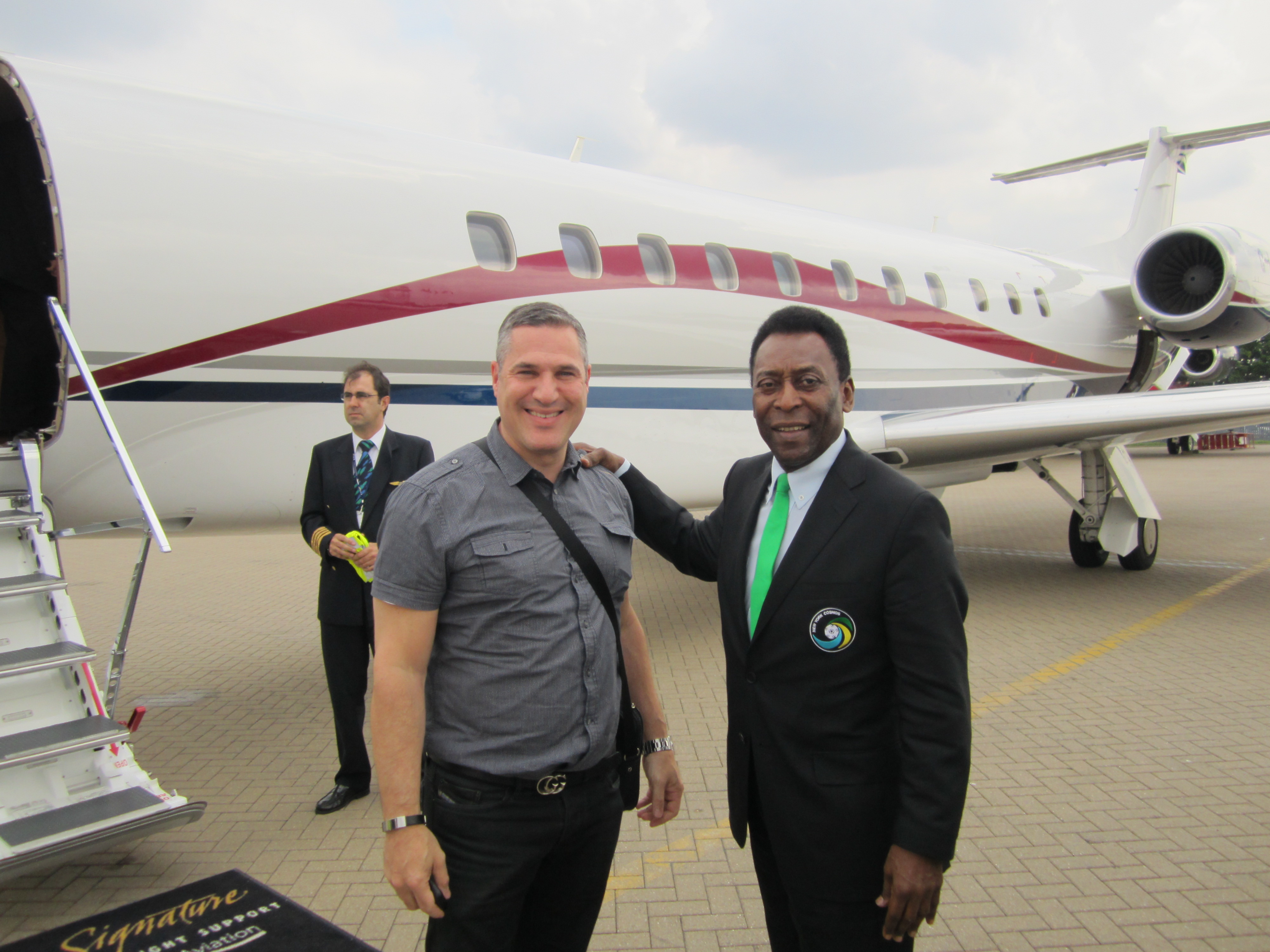
Wildes and Pelé celebrating after Wildes obtained an O-1 visa for the Brazilian soccer star

Other notable clients represented by Wildes as immigration attorney included Pelé, Sarah Brightman, Craig David, Boy George, Stefanía Fernández, Leila Lopes, Gabriela Isler, Jimena Navarrete Rosete, Dayana Mendoza, Gisele Bündchen, Greg Norman, and Melania Trump.

== Political career ==
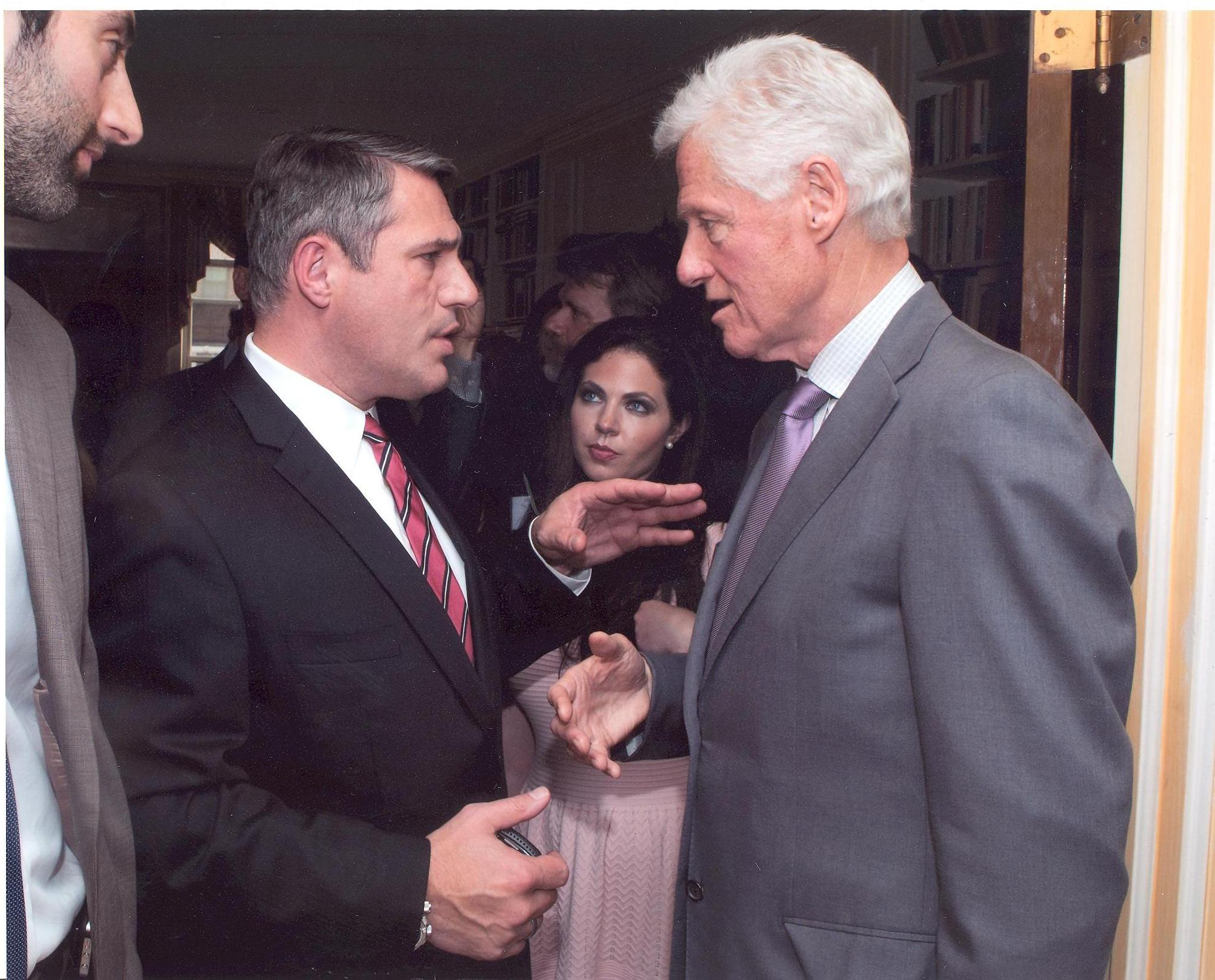
Wildes talks to Bill Clinton about immigration policy, June 2012.

In 1988, Wildes ran for Democratic District Leader of the 28th Assembly District, Part A in New York (which included Forest Hills, Rego Park, Elmhurst, and Maspeth).

=== Englewood City Council ===
In early March 1998, local media in northern New Jersey began publishing rumors that Wildes was being urged to run for the Democratic nomination for the 2nd Ward seat on the city council in Englewood, N.J. On Monday, March 16, 1998, the incumbent city councilman, Herb Honig, announced he would not seek reelection to a second term. Wildes announced that he would run for the seat the same day. However, the next day, Honig reversed his decision and decided he would run for reelection.

Local media largely portrayed Honig as the "consummate local politician", and Wildes as the "relative newcomer" in the primary election. The media focused on Wildes' Orthodox Jewish religious affiliation. He named public education, neighborhood beautification, and engaging young people in the political process as his top priority issues.

On March 25, 1998, the media reported that Honig had withdrawn from the city council race. The Englewood Democratic municipal committee voted to back Ellen Singer, a last-minute challenger, for the Democratic nomination on April 1, effectively barring Wildes from the race. The primary was scheduled for June 2. In late April, however, reports that Singer had not been a registered Democrat when she won the municipal committee vote put Wildes back in the race.

On May 20, 1998, the Northern Valley Suburbanite published the transcript of an audio recording of a phone call to Wildes, in which Singer's husband, Scott Singer, threatened Wildes if he did not exit the race. Wildes won the Democratic primary 694–344 on June 2, 1998. Wildes won the general election with no opposition on November 3, 1998.

Wildes was elected president pro tempore of the Englewood city council in 2000. He opposed the construction of a Home Depot in Englewood (planned for 2000), citing environmental, sanitation, and beautification factors, as well as the local public outcry against the construction; he also supported an elected school board, rather than an appointed one. The Suburbanite called him "the most activist [city councilman] in the city's history, giving the impression of never being off duty and never wishing to be off duty." Wildes was reelected to a second term on the city council in 2000.

Congressional testimony

In May 1999, during his first term on the city council, Wildes was asked to testify in front of the United States House Judiciary Subcommittee on Immigration and Border Security (then called the "Subcommittee on Immigration and Claims"). Wildes was invited to testify by Representative Rob Andrews (D-NJ). Andrews was sponsoring a piece of legislation (H.R. 2184) on finding and deporting illegal aliens associated with terrorism, and wanted a legal opinion. Wildes supported the bill, which targeted those who "knowingly aid and abet" individuals who plan or participate in terrorist acts. Wildes said he believed the bill struck an appropriate balance between defending the due process rights of individuals and defending the American public from acts of terrorism.

=== 2003: Election as Mayor of Englewood ===
In February 2003, local media speculated that Wildes would run for mayor of Englewood. Wildes had been raising Englewood's national profile by raising money for Democratic candidates. On Thursday, March 13, 2003, Wildes became the first candidate in the 2003 Englewood mayoral race to announce he was running to succeed Mayor Paul Fader, who had announced he would not be seeking reelection.

On March 19, New Jersey State Senator Byron Baer announced he would run against Wildes for mayor, at the urging of Bergen County Democratic Chairman Joe Ferriero. Englewood's Democratic committee, however, voted against Baer for mayor and supported Wildes 18–4. On April 3, at a public forum in Englewood, NJ, United States Senator Hillary Rodham Clinton endorsed Wildes for mayor. On April 9, it became clear that Wildes would be unopposed for the Democratic nomination and was set to face Republican candidate Ray Aspinwall in the November general election.

Local media predicted Wildes would easily win the general election due to Englewood's largely Democratic population. Byron Baer, Loretta Weinberg, Gordon Johnson, and several other prominent Englewood democrats backed Wildes for mayor in late September.

Ray Aspinwall, the Republican candidate for mayor, dropped out of the race. Wildes was elected mayor on November 4, 2003.

Wildes was sworn into his first term as mayor on January 1, 2004, by United States Senator Frank Lautenberg and Kadijah Thomas, the 2004 valedictorian of Dwight Morrow High School. Wildes held both of his grandfathers' Chumashim (printed Torahs), at the swearing-in ceremony.

Wildes endorsed a $46.6 million school construction proposal to rebuild and improve public education in Englewood. The plan, created by Schools Superintendent John Grieco, was described by The Bergen Record as "a 'no-frills' approach toward meeting state health and building codes in school facilities, some of which are 90 years old." Voters approved the school construction bond at a later referendum.

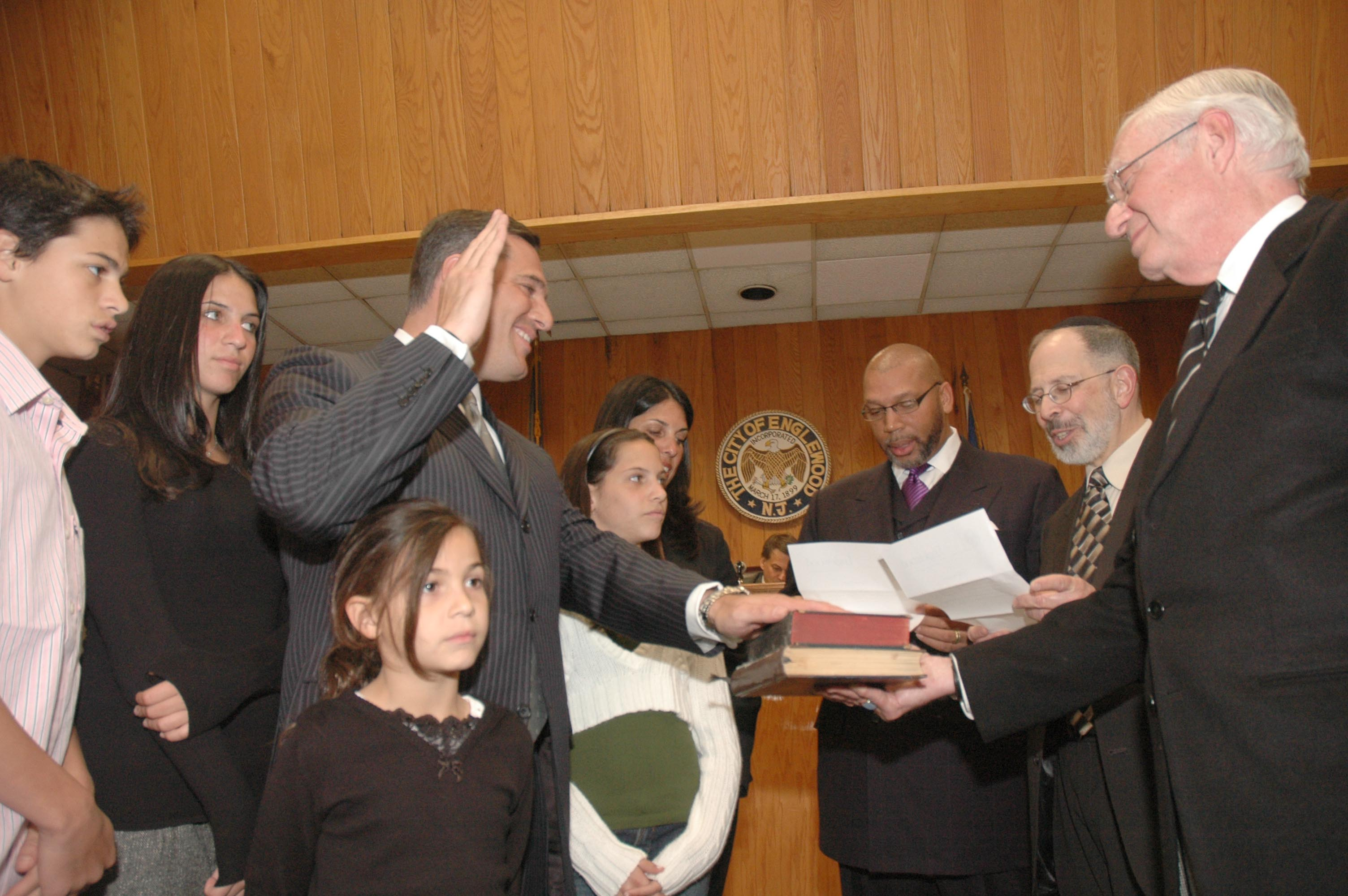
Wildes is sworn into his second term as mayor by Pastor Lester Taylor and Rabbi Shmuel Goldin, while his father, Leon Wildes (far right), looks on, January 2, 2007.

In his first speech as mayor, Wildes named three issues as his top priorities: "public education, property taxes, and bringing a fresh perspective to government." At an elementary school visit, a student asked Wildes who his earliest political influence was; he named John F. Kennedy. At another address at Dwight Morrow High School, he told the students, "Never underestimate what being a good person can do for you." The same month, Wildes met with Cristina Fernández de Kirchner, then First Lady of Argentina.

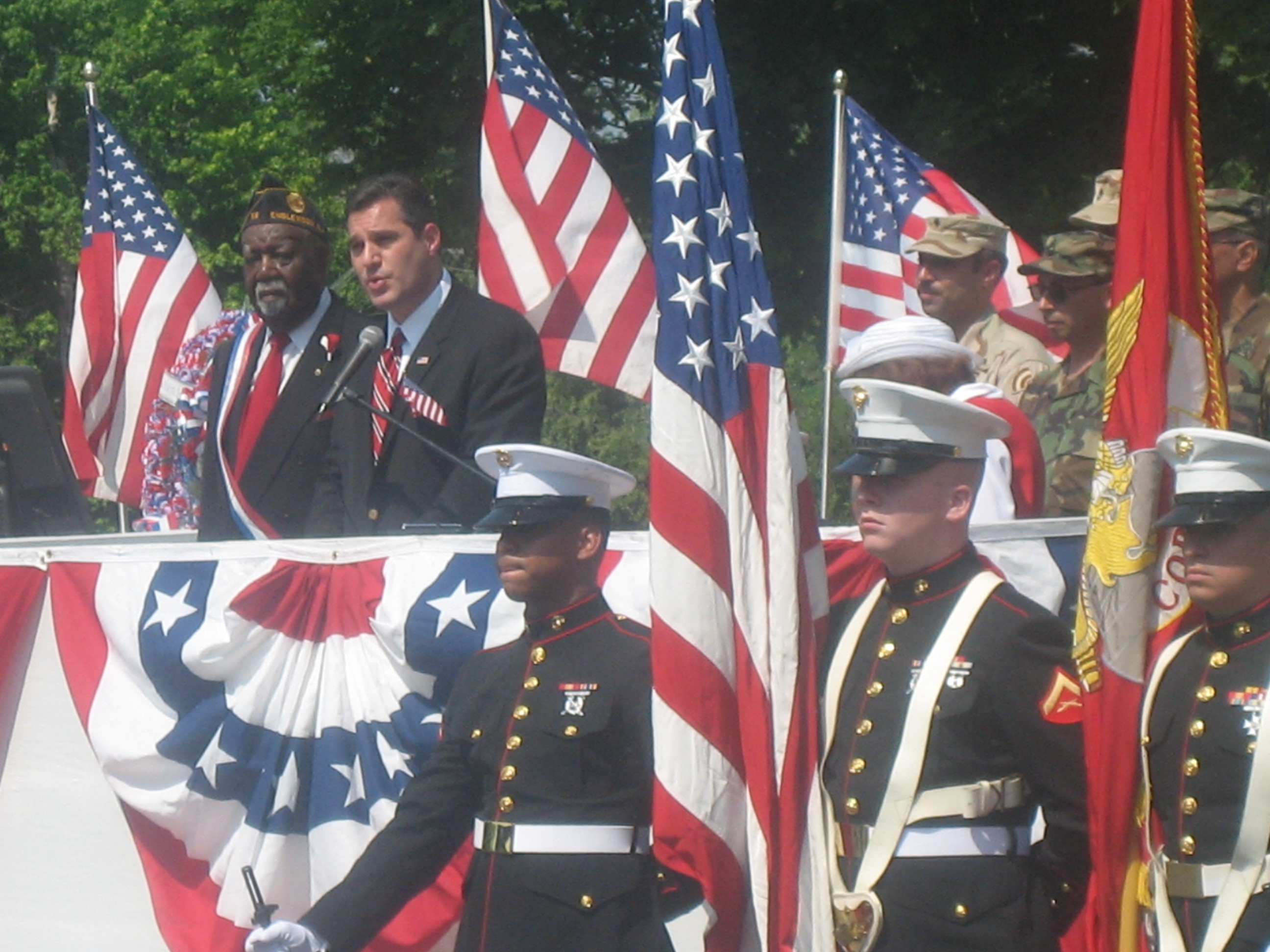
Wildes speaking at the Englewood Memorial Day parade, May 28, 2006

In February 2004, Wildes formed a task force to investigate reports by Latino immigrants living in Englewood that they had been targeted for exceedingly intrusive housing inspections. The Bergen Record printed reports of several raids in January 2004 that seemed to specifically target Colombian residents. In March 2004, Wildes ordered a study of Route 4 to check for possible repairs and other improvements to the highway.

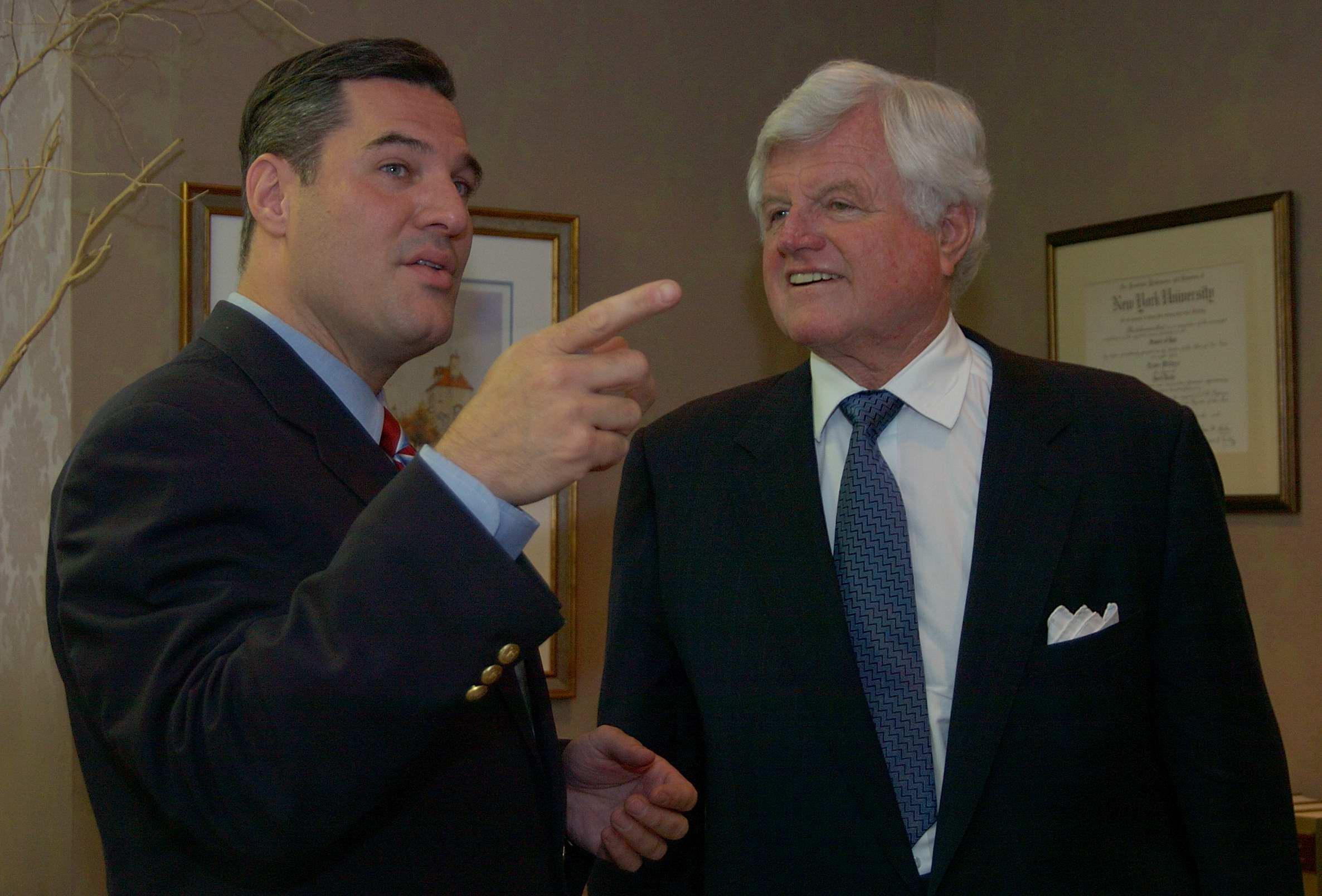
Mayor Wildes and Senator Ted Kennedy talk at a NORPAC fundraiser, July 11, 2005.

=== 2006 reelection ===
On October 19, Englewood City Councilman Kenneth Rosenzweig publicly endorsed Wildes for mayor at a fundraising event. A northjersey.com guide to the 2006 Englewood mayoral election named the Englewood community center, suburban growth, tax relief, and accountability as the biggest issues in the election. Soon after, former President of the United States Bill Clinton recorded a robocall endorsement of Wildes.

Wildes was reelected to a second term on Tuesday, November 7, 2006, with 4,379 votes. Stern garnered 2,325 votes, and Prince finished last with 372 votes. Wildes said he was "invigorated by the resounding support of members of the Englewood community." Wildes was sworn into his second term on January 2, 2007.

In the first week of his second term, Wildes named five new members to the Englewood planning board: Reverend Dr. Vernon Walton, Jordan Comet, Lenore Schiavelli, Leland Robinson, and Warren Finkel. In February 2007, Wildes was named chairman of a New Jersey State League of Municipalities Task Force to study the effect of illegal immigration on municipalities.

=== Appointment to Governor's Immigration Panel ===
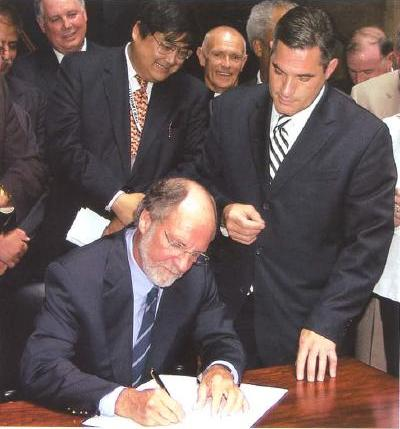
August 6, 2007: Wildes (right, hand on table) looks on as Governor Corzine signs Executive Order No. 78, establishing a special advisory panel on immigration. Wildes was a member of the panel.

On Monday, August 6, 2007, Wildes was appointed by New Jersey Governor Jon Corzine to a special Blue Ribbon Advisory Panel on Immigration. The panel, setup by Governor Corzine in response to immigration-focused demonstrations in Morristown, was created to make recommendations on "education, citizenship status, civil rights, fair housing, health care, language proficiency and job training," according to a Newsday article. The panel's 27 members were given 15 months to make recommendations. Wildes said the panel's creation was a necessary, temporary step "while Congress stands silently on the sidelines watching our broken immigration system fester."

Wildes cited his experience as an immigration attorney and mayor of a town with a large immigrant population as qualifications for his appointment to the panel. The panel's April 30, 2009, executive summary report made recommendations about immigrant access to social services, the labor force, education, and state and local government.

In 2008, MSNBC polled 1,000 mayors across the country, including Wildes, to ask what suggestions they had for incoming President-elect Barack Obama. Wildes named comprehensive immigration reform as the most important issue for Obama to focus on in his first term in office. Wildes wrote, "Our new President and Congress must enact comprehensive immigration reform that incorporates an earned legalization, appropriate legal channels for hiring low-skilled workers, and increased employer enforcement and sanctions."

In January 2009, Wildes met with New Jersey Homeland Security officials to discuss community safety. He said he was most concerned about terrorism directed at schools and places of worship. At his fifth State of the City Address, Wildes pledged to "push the limits of what we can do for the fine residents of this city" in his last year in office. Wildes stressed education, taxes, and government as his highest priority issues for the end of his second term.

On January 9, 2009, Wildes swore in Arthur O'Keefe as the new Chief of Police of Englewood. In February 2009, Wildes announced he would not seek a third term as mayor, to become managing partner of Wildes and Weinberg PC.

=== Anti-Gaddafi activities ===
Wildes generated widespread controversy in 2009 when he organized rallies to oppose Libyan President Muammar Gaddafi's visit to New Jersey.

Wildes pressed the U.S. State Department to prevent Gaddafi from staying in a tent on Donald Trump's estate in Englewood during the 2009 United Nations General Assembly meeting in New York City. Wildes said, "I have every problem with a person who admittedly blew up a plane killing 38 New Jersey residents and has the audacity in recent days to give a hero's welcome to a convicted terrorist. To have to remove his rubbish free of charge is insulting." Wildes maintained that the City of Englewood should not have to pay the cost of cleanup and security for the Libyan leader and the opposition protestors.

=== 2012 congressional election ===
In March 2012, Wildes decided to run in New Jersey's newly redrawn 9th congressional district, based in Bergen and Passaic counties. In the Democratic primary, he would have faced U.S. Congressmen Steve Rothman and Bill Pascrell. Local media speculated that Wildes' candidacy would have helped Pascrell win the primary. Wildes ultimately decided not to run and put his support behind Rothman in the Democratic primary. Rothman lost the election to Pascrell.

=== Second stint as mayor (2018-present) ===
On June 6, 2018, Wildes won the Democratic primary for mayor of Englewood, defeating his opponent Phil Meisner by a 2–1 margin. On November 6, 2018, Wildes was elected mayor, winning 84% of the vote in the general election.

He was re-elected for a fourth three-year term on November 2, 2021, and a fifth on November 5, 2024. This term is for four years as a result of NJ Assembly bill A3230 1R, which amended N.J.S.40A:9-130 to require all NJ municipalities with populations between 28,000 and 35,000 to have four-year mayoral terms.

== Philanthropy ==
Wildes has served on the boards of several major philanthropy organizations and has become well known for his charitable contributions and volunteer work. He served as chair of the American Jewish Congress' Committee on International Terrorism, and was a member of the advisory board for the Urban League of Bergen County.

He is currently a member of the Board of Directors of Boys Town Jerusalem, a Jewish orphanage in Israel. He has been a certified EMT since 1992, and is a volunteer for Hatzoloh, a Jewish emergency medical service in New York, and used to aid the Englewood Volunteer Ambulance Corp (EVAC). He also currently serves on the Board of Directors of WhyHunger, and is a member of the Council of Experts for the Community Security Service (CSS), an organization that protects the American Jewish Community.

He is a member of the Lay Advisory of the New York Board of Rabbis, and is a member of the New York State Bar Association. Wildes is also a member of the Board of Directors of the Manhattan Jewish Experience (MJE), an orthodox Jewish outreach program created by Wildes' brother, Rabbi Mark Wildes, who founded the organization in memory of their late mother, Ruth B. Wildes.

In February 2004, Wildes received the Aleh Foundation Civic Leadership Award for helping Aleh raise funds for developmentally disabled children in Israel. In April 2004, Wildes received the Henry Morgenthau Jr. Distinguished Service Award at the State of Israel Bonds National Dinner of Tribute.

== Personal life ==
Wildes married immigration attorney Amy Messer, in 1990. They met in Wildes' father's immigration class at Cardozo Law School.

== Works ==
- Michael Wildes (2018). Safe Haven in America: Battles to Open the Golden Door. American Bar Association. ISBN 978-1641051897.
- Wildes, Michael (February 15, 2010). "Bringing Immigration Into the 21st Century" (PDF). New Jersey Law Journal. 199 (7): 1–2.
- Wildes, Michael (April 12, 2010). "H-1B Site Visits and Former I-9 Audits" (PDF). New Jersey Law Journal. 200 (2): 1–2.
- Wildes, Michael (December 6, 2010). "Taking Our Medicine: Pressing Need for Immigration Reform". New Jersey Law Journal. 202 (10): 1–2.
- Wildes, Michael (December 5, 2011). "E-Verify: Presenting a Hobson's Choice to Employers" (PDF). New Jersey Law Journal. 206 (10): 1–2.
