= Mayor of Englewood, New Jersey =

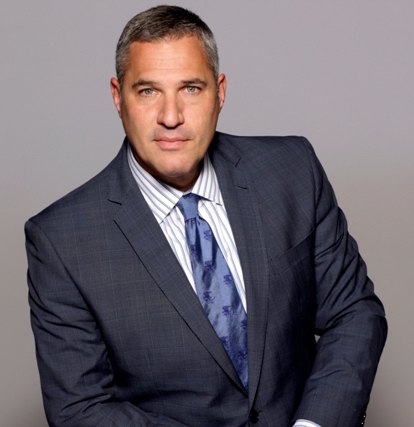
Incumbent mayor Michael Wildes

Englewood, New Jersey was incorporated on March 17, 1899. Beginning in 1980, Englewood switched from a Mayor-Council form of government to a modified Council-Manager plan of government in accordance with a Special Charter granted by the New Jersey Legislature. Under this charter, the mayor retains appointive and veto powers, while the council acts as a legislative and policy making body, with some power to appoint and confirm appointments. The City Council consists of five members, each elected for a three-year term. Four are elected from the individual wards in which they live and the other is elected by a citywide vote as an at-large member. The city is divided into four wards which are approximately equal in population. Administrative functions are responsibilities of the City Manager. The six seats in the governing body are elected in a three-year cycle as part of the November general election, with wards two and four both up together, followed a year later by wards one and three, and then the at-large council and mayoral seats. Each ward votes in two of the three years in the cycle, once for its ward seat, in the other year for the two positions voted at-large and one year with no election. The terms begin on January 1 of year after the November election.

== Mayors ==
Mayor	Term	Notes
Daniel A. Currie (1842–1911)	1896	He is claimed to be the first mayor of Englewood, New Jersey, but those before Elbert Adrain Brinckerhoff were declared void.
Elbert Adrain Brinckerhoff (1838–1913)	1899 to May 1901	He resigned. He was the first legal mayor of Englewood, New Jersey. He recommended an increase in the police force from seven police officers to nine, and the building of a city hall.
J. C. Anderson	1901 May to 1901 December	As acting mayor.
Daniel A. Currie (1842–1911)	1902 to 1903	
Dan Fellows Platt (1873–1937)	1904 to 1905	He died on 16 December 1937.
Donald Mackay	1906 to 1909	
James A. C. Johnson (1867–1937)	1910 to 1911 January	He resigned to join the New Jersey Senate.
Hezekiah Birtwhistle (?–1911)	1911 January to 1911 October	As acting mayor. He died in office.
William Conklin	1911 October to 1911 December	He was the acting mayor.
Vernon Monroe	1912 to 1915	
Clinton Hamlin Blake, Jr. (1883–?)	1915 to 1917	
David J. McKenna	1918 October to 1921 December	
Clarence Dillworth Kerr (?–1957)	1922 to 1923	
Colonel Harriot Van Devanter Moore (1879–1937)	1924 to 1925	
Douglas Gillespie Thomson, Sr. (1885–?)	1926 to 1929	He acted as an intermediary during the Lindbergh kidnapping with Arthur W. Springer.
Cornelius Porter Kitchel (1875–1947)	1930 to 1933	
Irving S. Reeve	1934 to 1935	
Charles B. Hayward (1877–1937)	1936 to 1937 October	He died in office.
Robert Story Tipping (1887–?)	1937 October to 1939	He was born on 4 May 1887.
Clarence Ambrose Clough (1883–?)	1940 to 1941	He married Ethel Kipp.
Charles William Floyd Coffin (1888–1968)	1942 to 1945	
Donald Aubrey Quarles (1894–1959)	1946 to 1947	
Melvin Leslie Denning (1895–1986)	1948 to 1953	He made the first long-distance call from coast to coast using the new direct distance dialing system.
Watson Gerald Clark, Jr.	1954 to 1955	
Albert Moskin (1900–1994)	1956 to 1959	
Austin Volk (1918–2010)	1960 to 1963	
Francis J. Donovan (?–1965)	1964 to 1965 April	He died in office.
William J. Ticknor	1965 April to 1966	As acting mayor.
Austin Volk (1918–2010)	1966 to 1967	
Robert I. Miller (?–2009)	1968 to 1969	
Ned Feldman	1970 to 1971	
Walter Taylor	1972 to 1975	First African-American mayor
Sondra J. Greenberg (1928–)	1976 to 1982	
Steven R. Rothman (1952–)	1983 to 1988	
Donald Aronson	1989 to 1997	In 1991 Wilson Pickett was arrested for making threats to Aronson.
Paul T. Fader (1959–2017)	1998 to 2003	
Michael Wildes (1964–)	2004 to 2010	
Frank Huttle III	2010 to 2018	
Michael Wildes (1964–)	2019–present	
