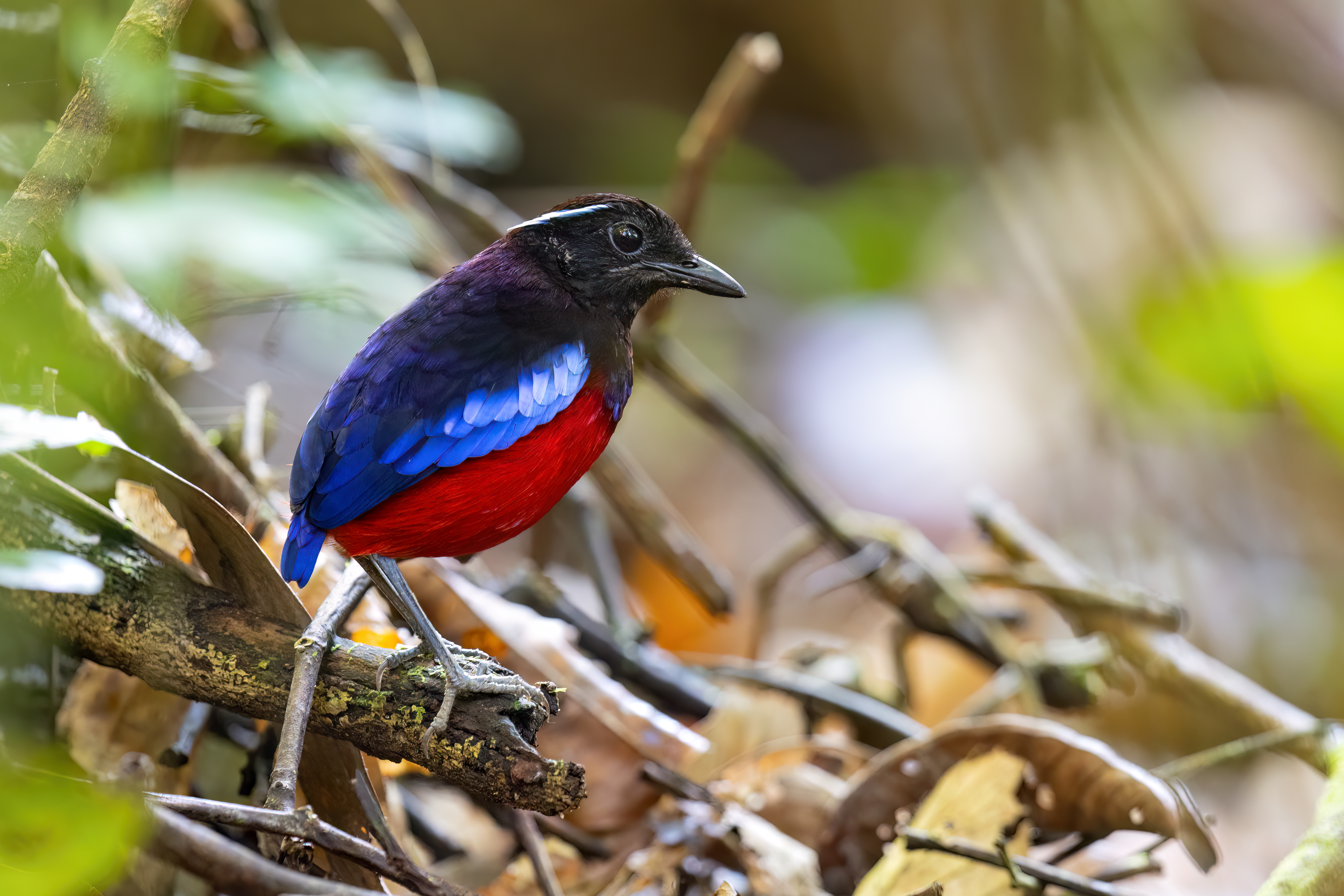

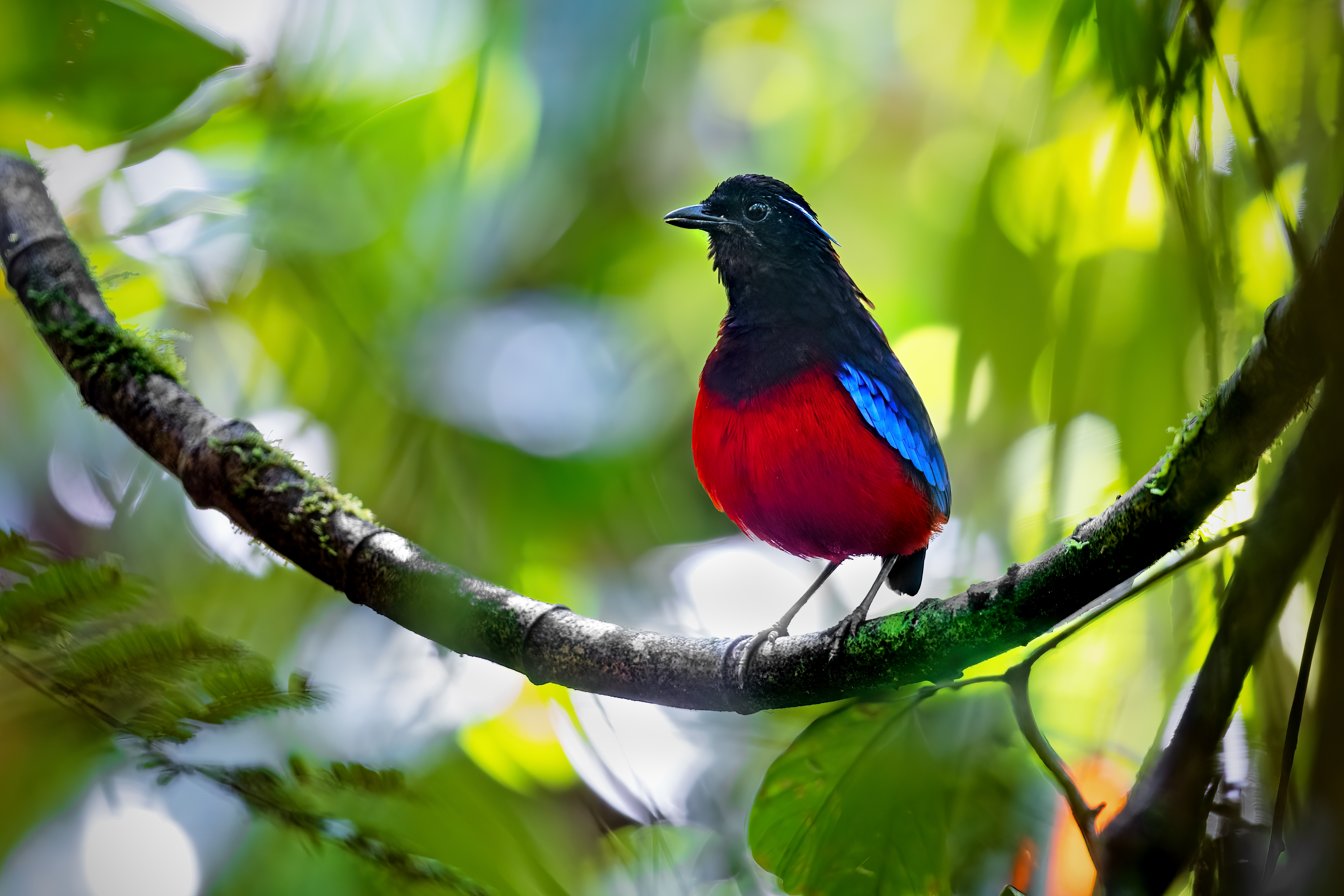
- E. ussheri in Tabin Wildlife Reserve, Malaysia

Conservation status
- Least Concern (IUCN 3.1)

Scientific classification
- Kingdom: Animalia
- Phylum: Chordata
- Class: Aves
- Order: Passeriformes
- Family: Pittidae
- Genus: Erythropitta
- Species: E. ussheri

Binomial name
- Erythropitta ussheri (Gould, 1877)

Synonyms
- Pitta ussheri Sharpe, 1877; Pitta venusta Gould, 1877; Pitta granatina Gould, 1877; Pitta ussheri Gould, 1877

= Black-crowned pitta =

Species of bird

The black-crowned pitta (Erythropitta ussheri), also known as the black-headed pitta, black-and-crimson pitta, black-and-scarlet pitta or black-crowned garnet pitta, is a brightly coloured, ground-dwelling, bird species in the pitta family Pittidae. It is endemic to the Southeast Asian island of Borneo.

== Taxonomy ==
The black-crowned pitta was formally described in 1877 by the English ornithologist John Gould based on specimens that had been collected near the Lawas River in northern Borneo and sent to London by the British colonial administrator Herbert Taylor Ussher. Gould used the binomial name Pitta ussheri with the specific epithet chosen to honour Ussher who had supplied the specimens. The English ornithologist Richard Bowdler Sharpe published a description later in the same year. The black-crowned pitta is now one of 13 species placed in the genus Erythropitta that was introduced in 1854 by the French naturalist Charles Lucien Bonaparte. The species is monotypic: no subspecies are recognised.

The pitta was formerly considered a subspecies of the garnet pitta (Erythropitta granatina) but was split because of morphological and vocal differences as well as apparent parapatry. Lack of evidence of hybridisation suggests that the garnet and black-headed pittas are allospecies.

== Description ==
The birds grow to a length of 13–15.5 cm (5.1–6.1 in) and a weight of 50–64 g (1.8–2.3 oz). An adult pitta is distinctively marked with a black head and breast contrasting with a crimson belly and prominent, pale blue, narrow raised stripes extending back from the eyes. The upperparts are dark purple-blue with an iridescent azure patch on the bend of the wing. The tip of the bill is bright red to orange. Nestlings are yellow with coral-red gapes and bill tips. Juveniles are uniformly dark brown until they begin to acquire adult plumage.

== Behaviour ==
=== Breeding ===
The breeding season extends from early February to late July, the driest time of the year. The nest has been described as domed, built on a muddy bank on a pile of coarse sticks and bark, with a cup made of fine roots and leaves, and a roof of leaves. A clutch of two is laid; the eggs are white with blotches and spots of dark red and black.

=== Feeding ===
The pitta consumes a variety of largely invertebrate prey. Its diet includes spiders, ants, cockroaches, beetles and snails.

=== Voice ===
Uttering monotonous whistles from a perch in Danum Valley, Malaysia

The call of the black-crowned pitta is similar to that of the garnet pitta in being characterised by a quiet whistle, lasting about four seconds, rising in both power and pitch. It differs in stopping less abruptly and in wavering slightly in mid-call.

== Distribution and habitat ==
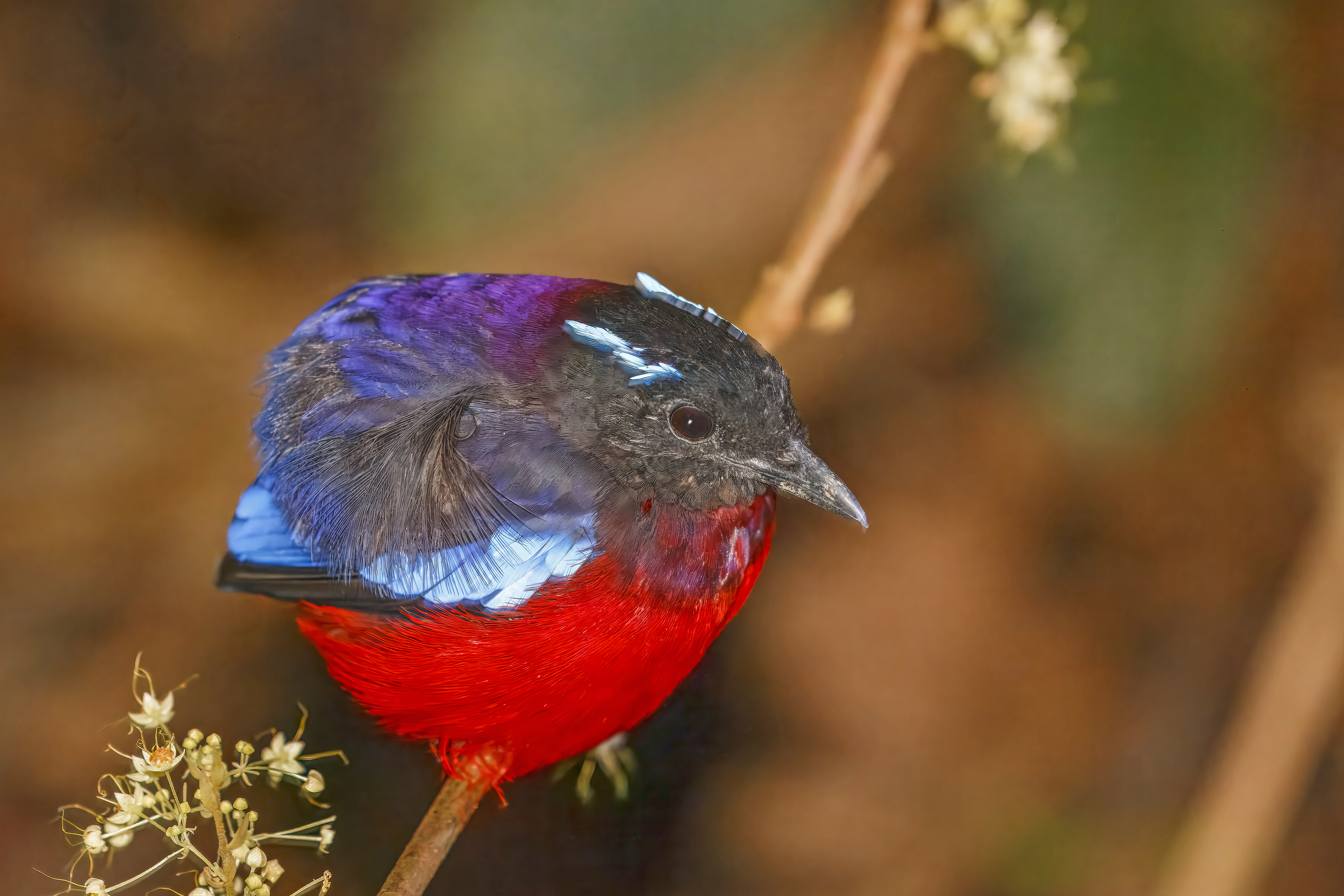
Roosting on a perch at night, in Sabah, Borneo, Malaysia

The pitta has only been recorded from the Malaysian state of Sabah in northern Borneo, where it occupies lowland tropical rainforests from sea level up to about 300 m, above which it is replaced by the blue-banded pitta. It prefers dark and damp places, especially ravines beneath dense cover. In prime habitat, such as the primary forest of the Danum Valley Conservation Area, recorded population densities are 21–22 pairs per square kilometre. It can also be found in areas that have been selectively logged as well as in overgrown rubber and Albizia plantations.

== Status and conservation ==
The pitta is likely to have been affected by the rapid and sustained deforestation which has taken place in northern Borneo. Despite the ability of the species to persist in some degraded habitats, it is thought to have suffered a moderately rapid population decline, and is classified as least concern.
