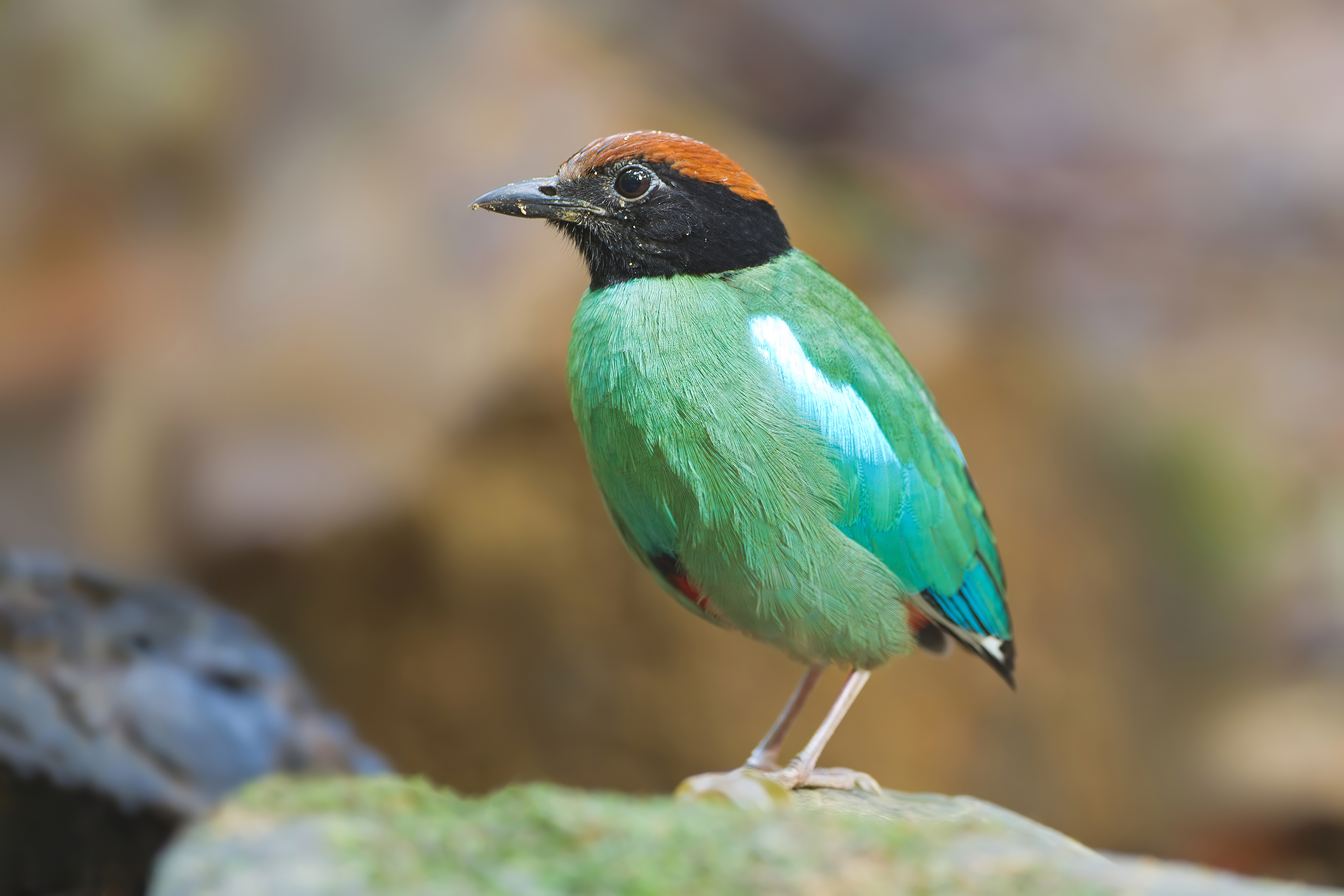
- Western hooded pitta in southern Thailand

Scientific classification
- Kingdom: Animalia
- Phylum: Chordata
- Class: Aves
- Order: Passeriformes
- Clade: Eupasseres
- Suborder: Tyranni
- Infraorder: Eurylaimides
- Family: Pittidae; Authority disputed. (Note: Walter Bock credited William Swainson, 1831 as the authority for the family name Pittidae. This assignment has been disputed by Storrs Olson on the grounds that Swainson merely used the word Pittae as the plural of the genus name Pitta to denote the species placed in this genus, without an intention to introduce a suprageneric name. Hugh Edwin Strickland used "Pittinae" for pittas, treated as a subfamily of the Turdidae or thrush family, in 1844.)

Genera
- Erythropitta; Hydrornis; Pitta

= Pitta =

Family of passerine birds

Pittas are a family, Pittidae, of passerine birds found in Asia, Australasia and Africa. There are 46 species of pittas, all similar in general appearance and habits. The pittas are suboscines from the Old World, and their closest relatives among other birds are in the genera Smithornis and Calyptomena. Initially placed in a single genus, as of 2009 they have been split into three genera: Pitta, Erythropitta and Hydrornis. Pittas are medium-sized by passerine standards, at 15 to 25 cm (6–10 in) in length, and stocky, with strong, longish legs and long feet. They have very short tails and stout, slightly decurved bills. Many have brightly coloured plumage.

Most pitta species are tropical; a few species can be found in temperate climates. They are mostly found in forests, but some live in scrub and mangroves. They are highly terrestrial and mostly solitary, and usually forage on wet forest floors in areas with good ground cover. They eat earthworms, snails, insects and similar invertebrate prey, as well as small vertebrates. Pittas are monogamous and females lay up to six eggs in a large domed nest in a tree or shrub, or sometimes on the ground. Both parents care for the young. Four species of pittas are fully migratory, and several more are partially so, though their migrations are poorly understood.

Four species of pitta are listed as endangered by the International Union for Conservation of Nature; a further nine species are listed as vulnerable and several more are near-threatened. The main threat to pittas is habitat loss in the form of rapid deforestation, but they are also targeted by the cage-bird trade. They are popular with birdwatchers because of their bright plumage and the difficulty in seeing them.

== Taxonomy and systematics ==
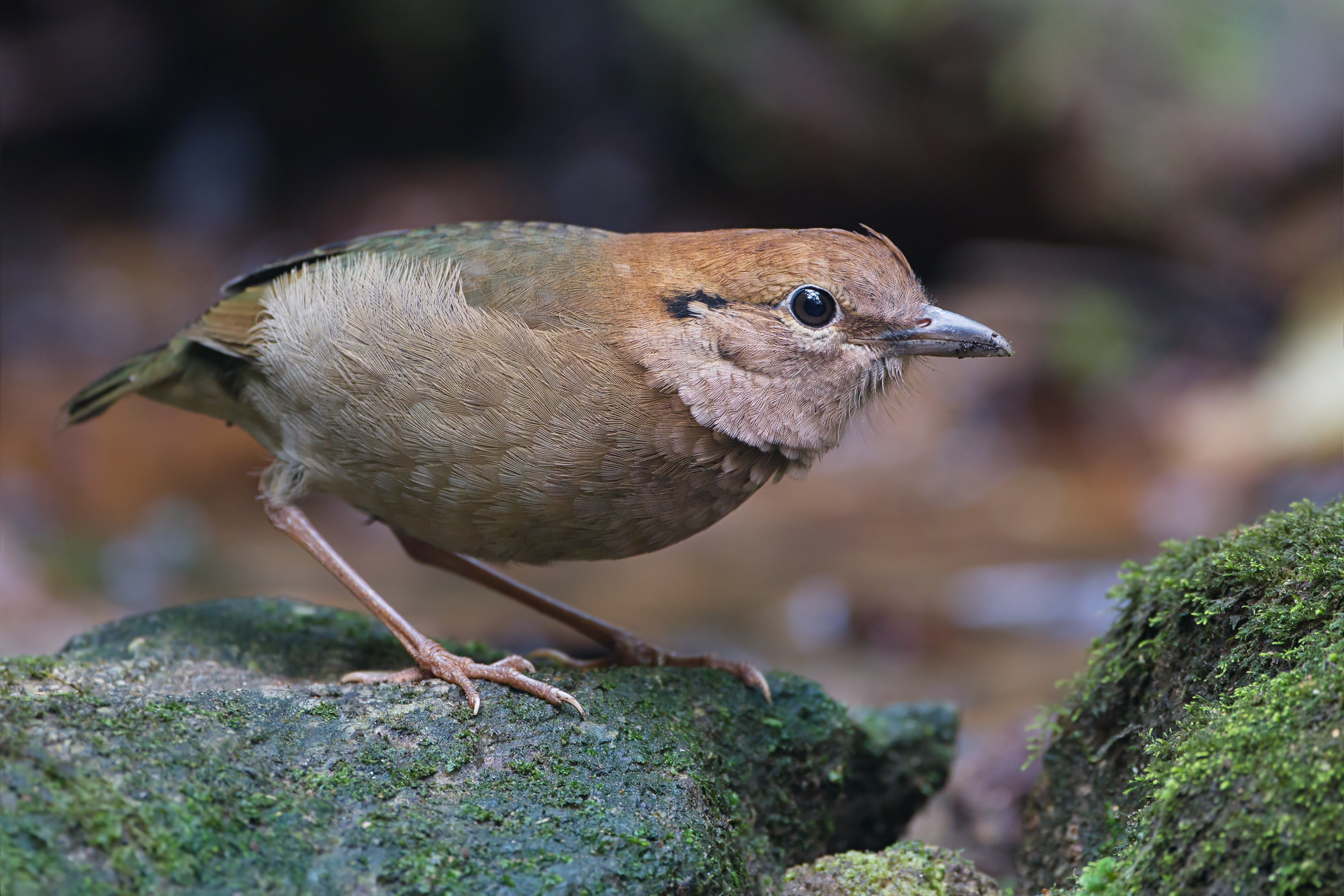
The rusty-naped pitta was once placed in the genus Pitta but is now in Hydrornis.

The first pitta to be described scientifically was the Indian pitta, which was described and illustrated by George Edwards in 1764. Carl Linnaeus included the species in his revised 12th edition (1766–1768) of the Systema Naturae based on Edwards' descriptions and illustrations as well as other accounts, placing it with the Corvidae as Corvus brachyurus. Ten years later Statius Müller moved it and three other pittas to the thrush family Turdidae and the genus Turdus, due to similarities of morphology and behaviour. In 1816 Louis Pierre Vieillot moved it to the new genus Pitta. The name is derived from the word పిట్ట (pitta) in the Telugu language of South India meaning "small bird".

The family's closest relatives have for a long time been assumed to be the other suboscine birds (suborder Tyranni), and particularly the Old World suboscines; the broadbills, asities and the New World sapayoa. These arboreal relatives were formerly treated as two families, and are now either combined into a single taxon or split into four. A 2006 study confirmed that these were indeed the closest relatives of the pittas. The clade they form, the Eurylaimides, is one of the two infraorders of suboscines, which is one of three suborders of the passerine birds. With regards to their relationship within the Eurylaimides, another 2006 study placed the pittas as a sister clade to two clades of broadbills and asities. This same study postulated an Asian origin for the Eurylaimides and therefore the pittas.

- - - - Pittidae (pittas)
      - Calyptomenidae (green and African broadbills)
    - - Eurylaimidae (broadbills)
      - Philepittidae (asities)
  - Sapayoidae (sapayoa)

Phylogeny of the Eurylaimides, showing the relationship of the pittas (Pittidae), based on Selvatti et al, 2016

Two DNA studies, from 2015 and 2016, came to a different conclusion, finding that the Eurylaimides were divided into two clades and that the pittas formed a clade with the broadbills of the genera Smithornis and Calyptomena, with the remaining broadbills and asities in the other clade. The 2016 study also disputed the earlier claims about the origin of the group, and concluded that the most likely ancestral home of the pittas and the Eurylaimides was Africa (the sapayoa having diverged before the core clades had reached Africa). The study found that the pittas diverged from the Smithornis and Calyptomena broadbills 24 to 30 million years ago, during the Oligocene. The pittas diverged and spread through Asia before the oscines (suborder Passeri) reached the Old World from Australia.

The number of pitta genera has varied considerably since Vieillot, ranging from one to as many as nine. In his 1863 work A Monograph of the Pittidae, Daniel Elliot split the pittas into two genera, Pitta for the species with comparatively long tails and (the now abandoned) Brachyurus for the shorter-tailed species. Barely two decades later, in 1880/81, John Gould split the family into nine genera, in which he also included the lesser melampitta (in the genus Melampitta) of New Guinea, where it was kept until 1931 when Ernst Mayr demonstrated that it had the syrinx of an oscine bird. Philip Sclater's Catalogue of the Birds of the British Museum (1888) brought the number back down to four – Anthocincla, Pitta, Eucichla, and Coracopitta. Elliot's 1895 Monograph of the Pittidae included three genera split into subgenera Anthocincla, Pitta (subgenera Calopitta, Leucopitta, Gigantipitta, Hydrornis, Coloburis, Cervinipitta, Purpureipitta, Phaenicocichla, Monilipitta, Erythropitta, Cyanopitta, Galeripitta, Pulchripitta, Iridipitta), and Eucichla (subgenera Ornatipitta, Insignipitta).

- - - Pitta
    - Erythropitta
  - Hydrornis

Phylogeny of the family Pittidae, based on Selvatti et al, 2016

Modern treatments of taxa within the family vary as well. A 1975 checklist included six genera, whereas the 2003 volume of the Handbook of the Birds of the World, which covered the family, placed all the pittas in a single genus. Writing in 1998, Johannes Erritzoe stated that most contemporary authors considered the family to contain a single genus. Before 2006 the family was not well studied using modern anatomical or phylogenetic techniques; two studies, in 1987 and 1990, each used only four species, and comparisons amongst the family as a whole had relied mostly on external features and appearances.

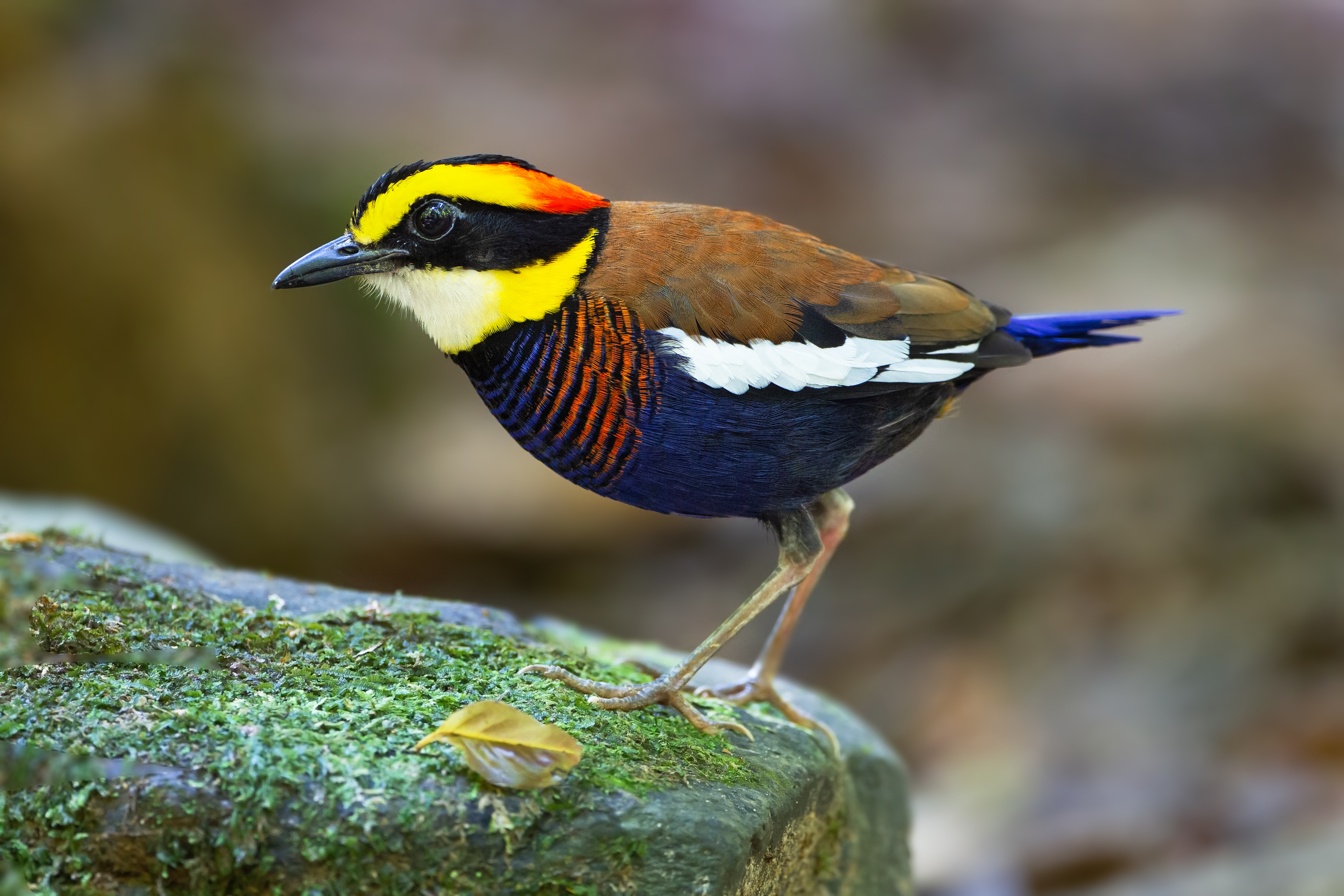
In 2010 the banded pitta was split into three species, making this male a Malayan banded pitta.

A 2006 study of the nuclear DNA of the pittas was the first to examine most representatives of the family, and found evidence of three major clades of pitta. Based on the study the pittas were split into three genera. The first clade, using the genus name Erythropitta, included six species that had previously been considered closely related based on external features. They are all generally small species with small tails, extensive amounts of crimson or red on the underparts, and greenish or blueish backs. The second genus, Hydrornis, includes variable Asian species. These species are unified morphologically in exhibiting sexual dimorphism in their plumage, as well as in possessing cryptic juvenile plumage (in all the species thus-far studied). This genus includes the eared pitta, which had often been placed into its own genus, Anthocincla, on account of its apparently primitive characteristics. The third genus, Pitta, is the most widespread. Most species in this genus have green upperparts with a blue wing-patch, dark upperparts and cinnamon-buff underparts. This clade contains all the migratory pitta species, and it is thought that many of the pitta species from islands are derived from migratory species. This division of the pittas into three genera has been adopted by the International Ornithological Congress' (IOC) Birds of the World: Recommended English Names, the Handbook of the Birds of the World's HBW Alive checklist, and the International Union for Conservation of Nature (which follows the HBW Alive checklist).

As with genera, there has been considerable variation in the number of accepted pitta species. The checklists of Sclater and Elliot at the end of the 19th century contained 48 and 47 species respectively. More recent checklists have had fewer than this, one from 1975 listing just 24 species. Since the 1990s, the figure has been between 30 and 32 species; the 2003 Handbook of the Birds of the World recognised 30. One species not recognised by the handbook is the black-crowned pitta, which it treated as a subspecies of either the garnet pitta or the graceful pitta. Since the publication of the handbook, further splits to pitta species have been made; in 2010 the banded pitta was split into three species, one endemic to Java and Bali, one endemic to Borneo and one found in Sumatra and the Thai-Malay Peninsula. A 2013 study found that the red-bellied pitta, a widespread species found from Sulawesi to Australia, was actually a species complex. The study divided it into 17 new species; some authorities have recognised fewer, for example the IOC have recognised only 10.

== Description ==
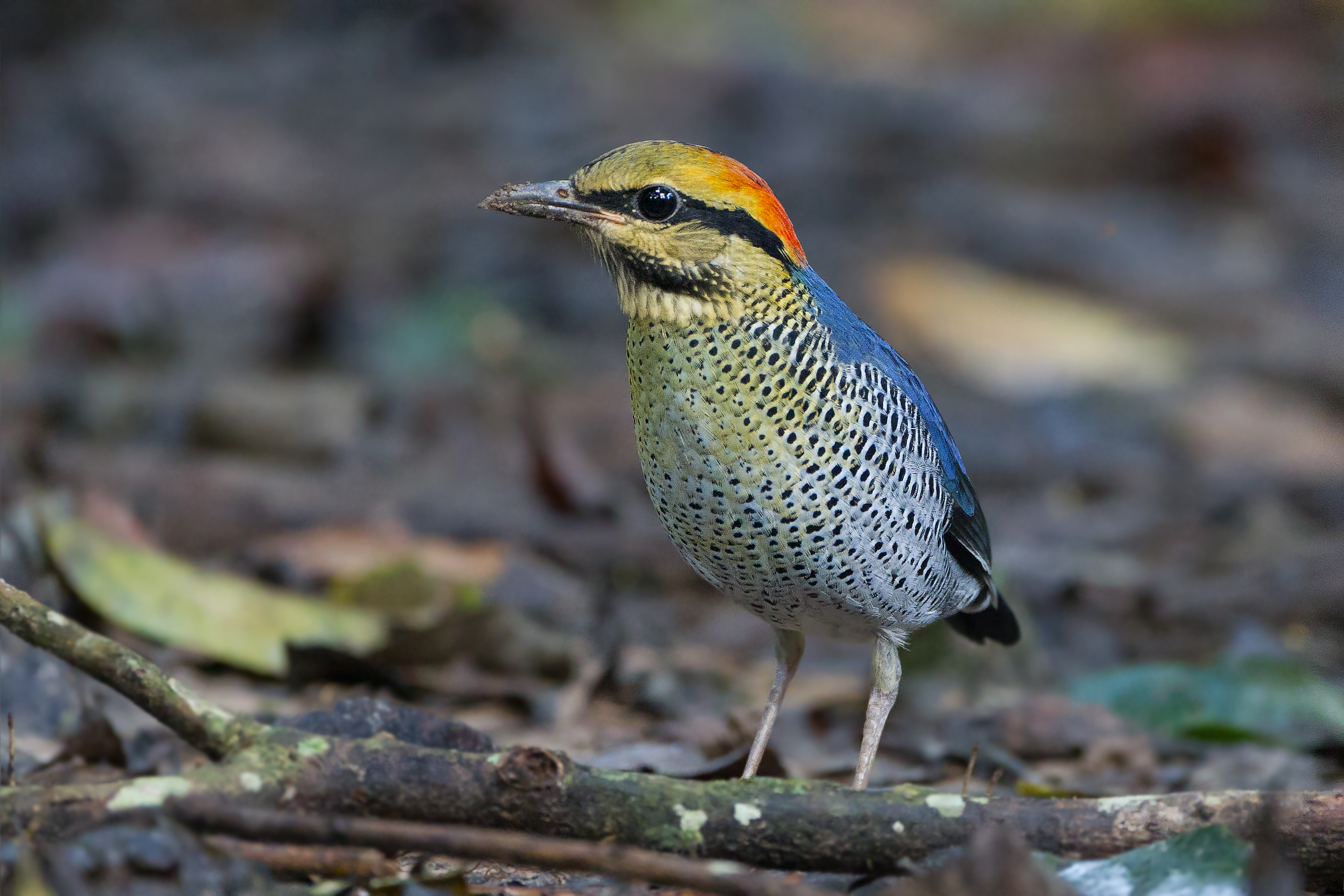
The blue pitta is sexually dimorphic, the bright plumage of this bird means it is a male

The pittas are small to medium-sized passerines, ranging in size from the blue-banded pitta at 15 cm (5.9 in) to the giant pitta, which can be up to 29 cm (11 in) in length. In weight they range from 42 to 210 g (1.5–7.4 oz). Pittas are stout-bodied birds with long, strong tarsi (lower leg bones) and long feet. The colour of the legs and feet can vary dramatically even within a species. This may be a characteristic used by females in judging the quality of a prospective mate. The wings have ten primaries that are generally rounded and short; those of the four migratory species are more pointed. There are nine secondaries with the tenth being vestigial. Anatomically, pittas have large temporal fossae in the skull unlike typical perching birds. The syrinx is tracheo-bronchial and lacks a pessulus or intrinsic muscles. Pittas are behaviourally reluctant to fly, but are capable and even strong fliers. The tails range from being short to very short, and are composed of twelve feathers.

Unlike most other forest-floor bird species, the plumage of pittas is often bright and colourful. Only one species, the eared pitta, has entirely cryptic colours in the adults of both sexes. In the same genus, Hydrornis, are three further species with drabber than average plumage, the blue-naped pitta, blue-rumped pitta and rusty-naped pitta. Like the other Hydrornis pittas they are sexually dimorphic in their plumage, the females tending towards being drabber and more cryptic than the males. In general the sexes in the family tend to be very similar if not identical. Across most of the family the brighter colours tend to be on the undersides, with patches or areas of bright colours on the rump, wings and uppertail coverts being concealable. Being able to conceal bright colours from above is important as most predators approach from above; four species have brighter upperparts.

== Distribution and habitat ==
The pittas are generally birds of tropical forests, semi-forests and scrub. Most species need forests with much cover, a rich understory, and leaf litter for feeding, and they are often found near waterways as well. Some species inhabit swamps and bamboo forests, and the mangrove pitta, as its name suggests, is a mangrove specialist. Several species are lowland forest specialists. For example, the rainbow pitta is not found above 400 m (1,300 ft). Other species may occur at much higher elevations, including, for example, the rusty-naped pitta, which has been found up to 2,600 m (8,500 ft). The altitudinal preferences varies in the fairy pitta across its range, it can be found up to 1,300 m (4,300 ft) in Taiwan but stays at lower altitudes in Japan. As well as natural habitats, pittas may use human-altered spaces. For example, migrating blue-winged pittas and hooded pittas use parks and urban gardens in Singapore.

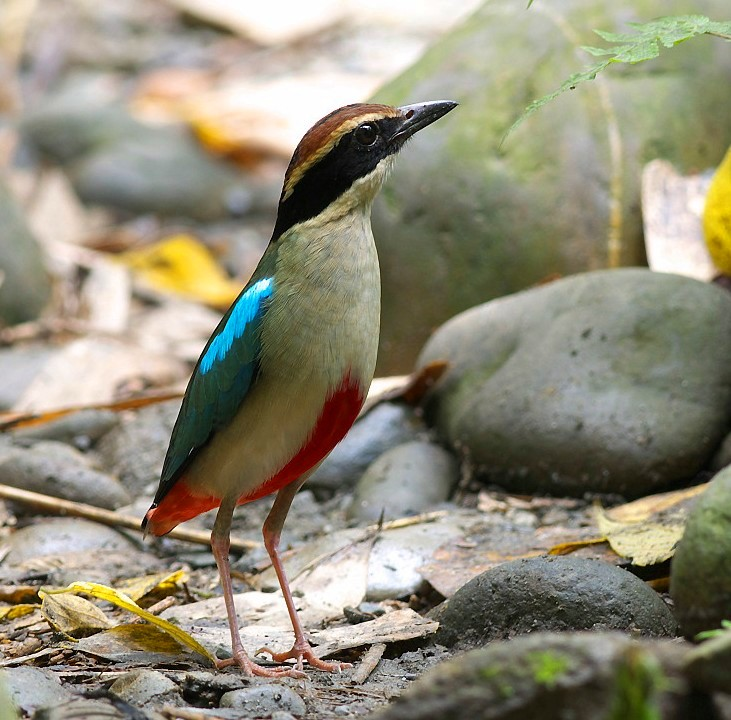
The fairy pitta migrates from Korea, Japan, Taiwan and coastal China to Borneo

The greatest diversity of pittas is found in South-east Asia. Of the three genera, the large genus Pitta is the most widespread. The two species found in Africa, the African pitta and green-breasted pitta, are from this clade, as is the most northerly species (the fairy pitta) and the most southerly (the noisy pitta, Pitta versicolor). The most remote insular endemics are in this group as well, including the black-faced pitta, which is endemic to the Solomon Islands. The pittas of the clade Erythropitta are mostly found in Asia. with one species, the Papuan pitta, reaching the north of Australia. The Hydrornis pittas are exclusively Asian. Some pittas have large distributions, like the hooded pitta, which ranges from Nepal to New Guinea, while others have much smaller ones, like the superb pitta, which is endemic to the tiny island of Manus in the Admiralty Islands.

The movements of pittas are poorly known and notoriously difficult to study. Bird ringing studies have not shed much light on this. One study in the Philippines ringed 2000 red-bellied pittas but only recaptured ten birds, and only one of these recaptures was more than two months after the initial capture. Only four species of pitta are fully or mostly migratory, all in the genus Pitta: the Indian pitta, the African pitta, the fairy pitta and the blue-winged pitta. As well as these four, the northern subspecies of the hooded pitta is a full migrant. Other species make smaller or more local, and poorly understood, movements across small parts of their range, including the noisy pitta of Australia. The migration of pittas is apparently nocturnal, and pittas migrate in small loose flocks that use the same resting and foraging sites each year.

== Behaviour and ecology ==
=== Sociality and calls ===
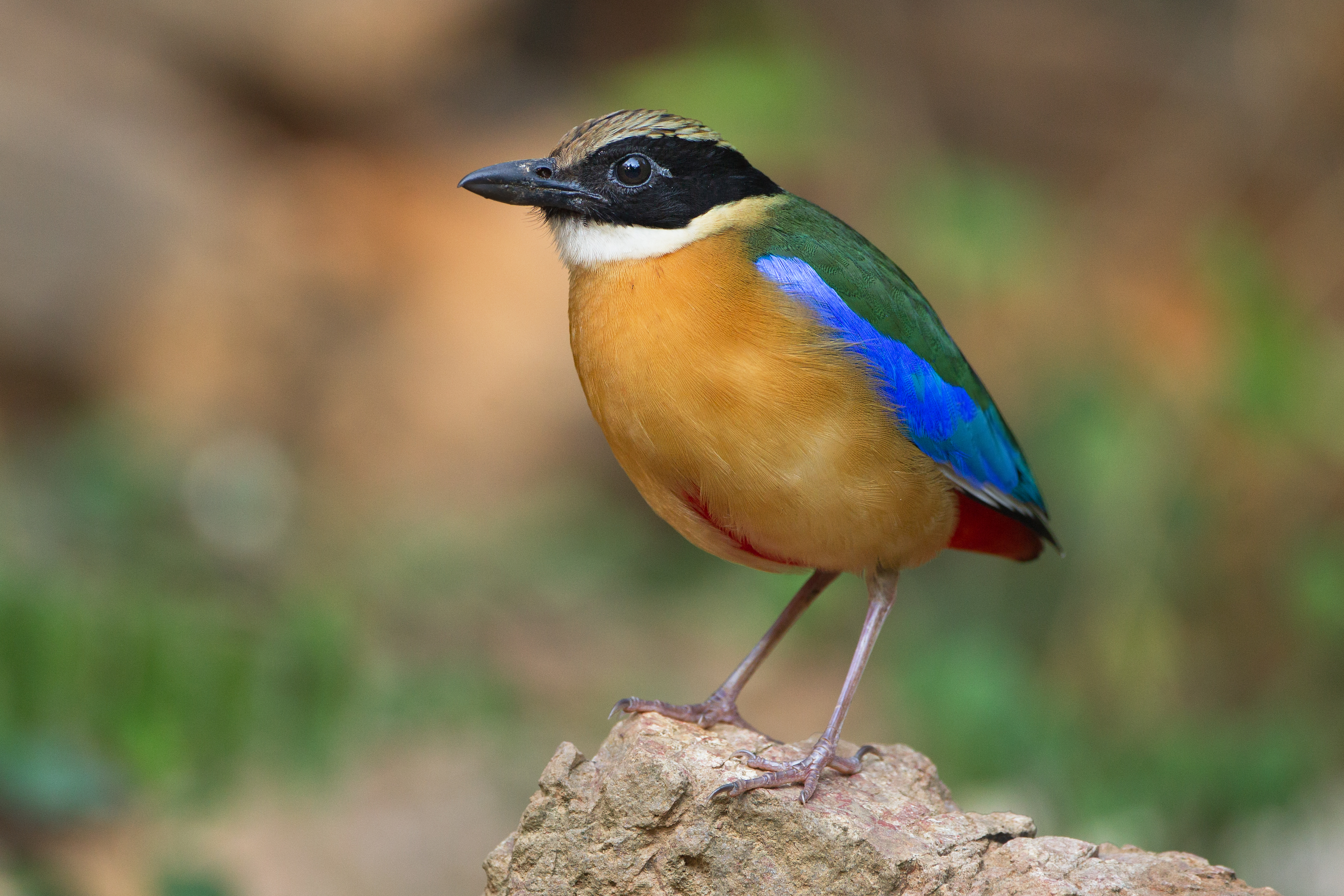
Blue-winged pitta (Pitta moluccensis), Kaeng Krachan, Thailand

The call of the blue-winged pitta
Recorded in Phuket, Thailand

Pittas are diurnal, requiring light to find their often cryptic prey. They are nevertheless often found in darker areas and are highly secretive, though they will respond to imitations of their calls. They are generally found as single birds, even young birds not associating with their parents unless they are being fed. The only exception to their solitary lifestyle is small groups that have been observed forming during migration.

The pittas are strongly territorial, with territories varying in size from 3,000 m^{2} (32,000 sq ft) in the African pitta to 10,000 m^{2} (110,000 sq ft) in the rainbow pitta. They have also been found to be highly aggressive in captivity, attacking other species and even their own; such behaviour has not been observed in the wild. Pittas will perform territory-defence displays on the edges of their territories; fights between rivals have only been recorded once. One such territorial display is given by the rainbow pitta, which holds its legs straight and bows to a rival on the edge of its territory, while making a purring call. Displays like this are paired with calls made out of sight of potential rivals; these territorial calls are frequent and can account for up to 12% of a bird's daylight activity. Migratory species will defend non-breeding feeding territories as well as their breeding ones.

The vocalisations of pittas are best described as calls, as they are generally short, mono or disyllabic, and often fluting or whirring. They are made by both sexes and throughout the year. One species, the black-and-crimson pitta, was also described making a mechanical noise (sonation) in 2013. The sonation, a clapping sound, was made in flight and is hypothesised to be made by the wings.

=== Diet and feeding ===
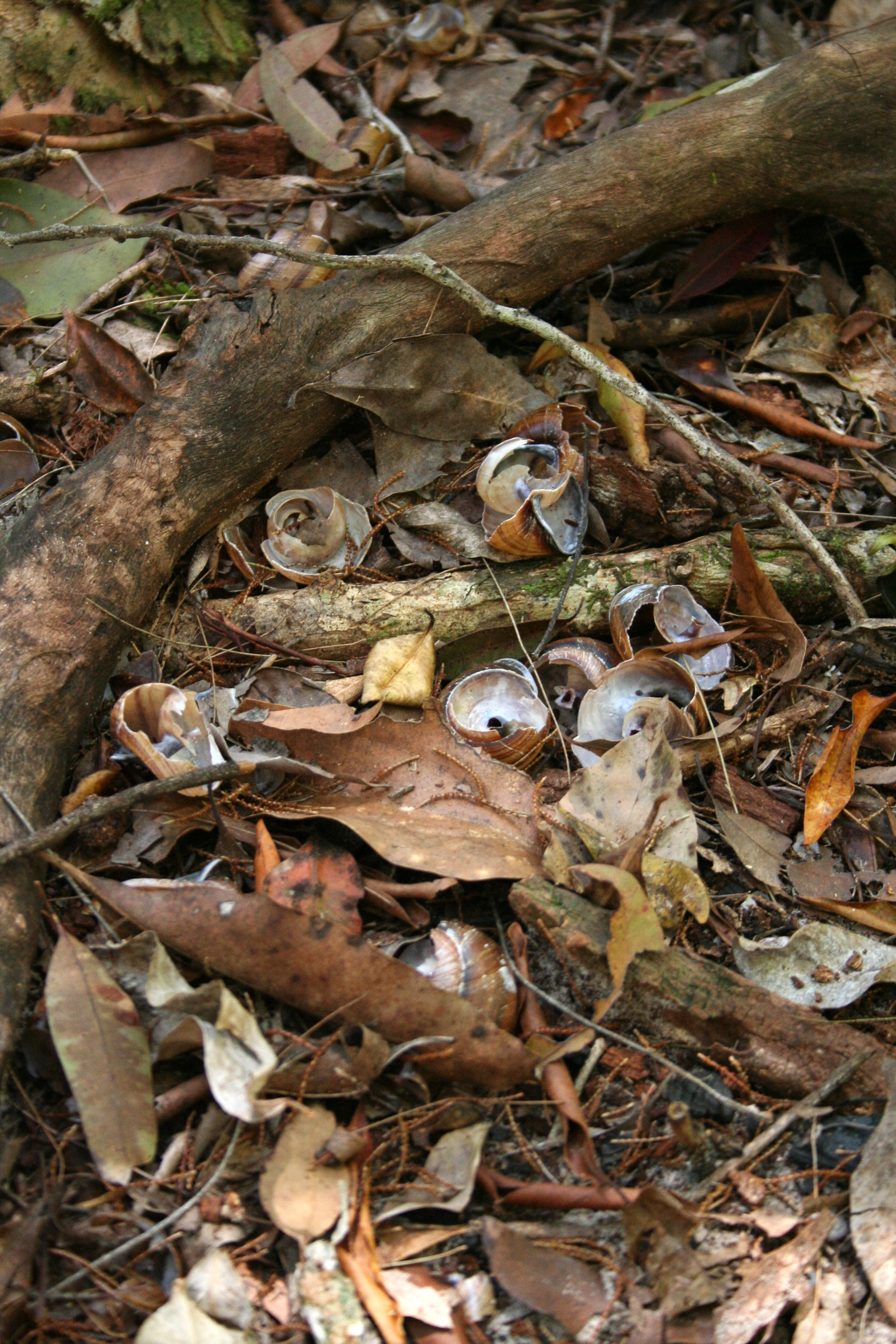
The anvil of a noisy pitta, used to smash snails against to remove the shells

Earthworms form the major part of the diet of pittas, followed by snails. Earthworms can become seasonally unavailable in dry conditions when the worms move deeper into the soil, and pittas also take a wide range of other invertebrate prey, including many insects groups such as termites, ants, beetles, true bugs, and lepidopterans. Freshwater crabs, centipedes, millipedes, and spiders are also taken. Some species, such as the fairy pitta and rainbow pitta, have been recorded feeding on small vertebrate prey. This including skinks, frogs, snakes and, in the case of the fairy pitta, shrews. There are also records of some pittas taking plant food, such as the Carpentaria palm fruits or maize seeds.

Pittas feed in a thrush-like fashion, moving aside leaves with a sweeping motion of the bill. They have also been observed to probe the moist soil with their bills to locate earthworms. They have a keen sense of smell, and it has been suggested that they are able to locate earthworms this way. This suggestion was supported by a study which found that the Indian pitta has the largest olfactory bulb of 25 passerines examined. Eight species have been recorded using stones as anvils on which to smash open snails to eat, and the rainbow pitta has been observed using the root of a tree to do so.

=== Breeding ===
Like most birds, pittas are monogamous breeders, and defend breeding territories. Most species are seasonal breeders, timing their breeding to occur at the onset of the rainy season. An exception to this is the superb pitta, which breeds almost year-round, as the island of Manus on which it breeds remains wet all year. The courtship behaviours of the family are poorly known, but the elaborate dance of the African pitta includes jumping into the air with a puffed-out breast and parachuting back down to the perch.

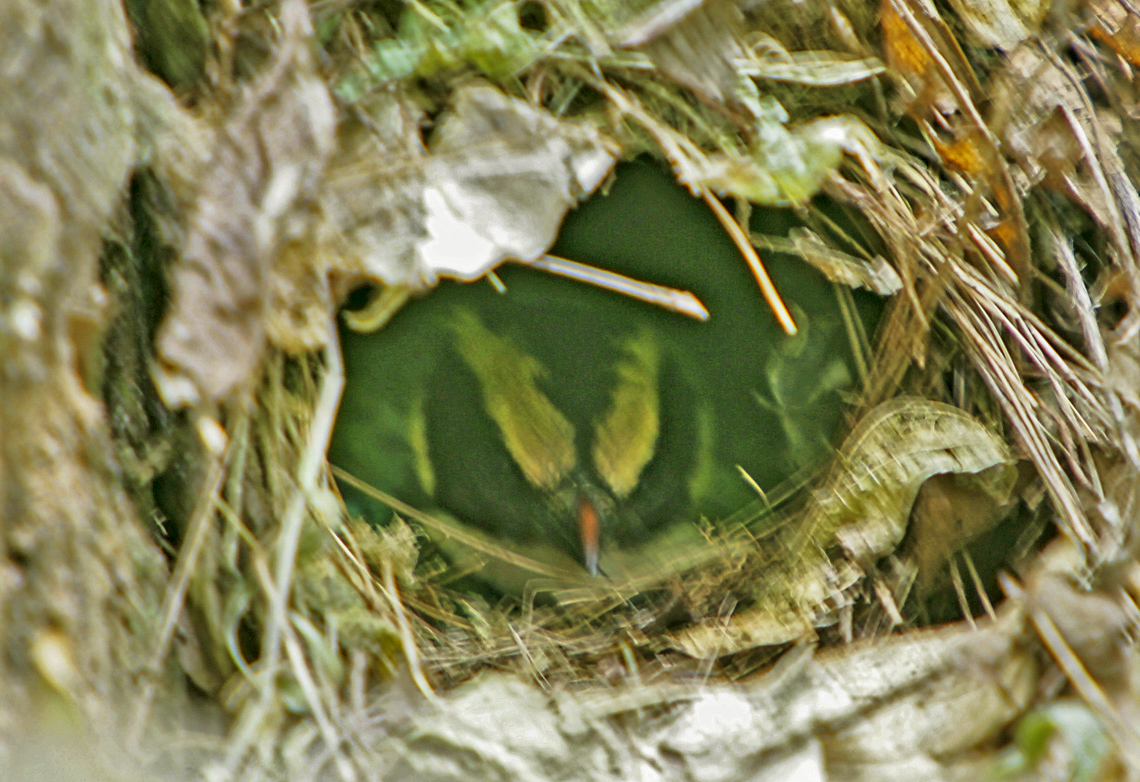
An incubating green-breasted pitta in its domed nest

Pittas build a rudimentary nest that is a dome with a side entrance. The structure of the nest is consistent across the whole family. The nest is as large as a rugby ball, and is usually well-camouflaged amongst vines or vegetation of some kind. The nest's appearance is also difficult to distinguish from a heap of leaves pushed together by the wind; a few species create a "doormat" of sticks (sometimes decorated with mammal dung) by the entrance. The nests can either be placed on the ground or in trees. Some species always nest in trees, like both African species, others nest only on the ground, and others show considerable variation. Both sexes help to build the nest, but the male does most of the work. It takes around two to eight days to build a new nest; this probably varies depending on the experience of the birds involved. A new nest is constructed for each nesting attempt, and work on building a nest for a second brood may start while the chicks from the first brood are still being fed.

The clutch size varies by species. Typically three to five eggs are laid, but two is typical for the garnet pitta, whereas six is more common for the blue-winged pitta and the Indian pitta. It is thought that species with higher levels of predation tend to have smaller clutches, as smaller clutches involve fewer provisioning trips that might alert a predator to the presence of a nest, and smaller clutches are easier to replace if lost. Clutch size may vary within a species depending on latitude. A study of noisy pittas found that birds in the tropics had smaller clutch sizes than those in more temperate environments. The eggs of pittas are slightly pointed at one end, and generally smooth (the deeply pitted eggs of the superb pitta being the exception to this). The size of eggs varies by species, smaller-sized species laying smaller eggs. There is also some variation in egg size within a species in species with large ranges. For example, the eggs of noisy pittas are smaller closer to the tropics. Eggs are typically white or creamy, and usually slightly glossy.

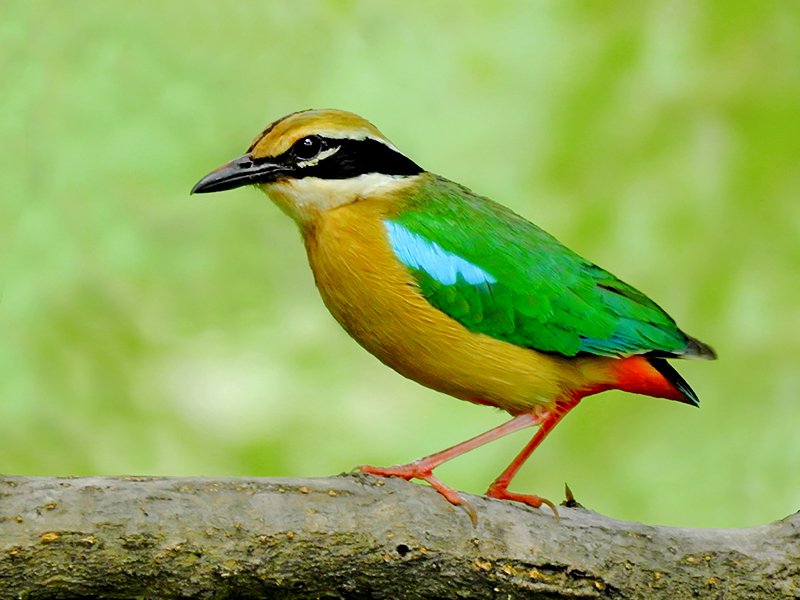
The Indian pitta has a clutch size of six or more eggs

Both parents incubate the clutch, the period between laying and hatching being between 14 and 18 days (14 to 16 being more typical). The chicks usually hatch asynchronously, over several days, but in some species the hatching is synchronous. On hatching the Gurney's pitta parents are reported to consume the eggshells. This behaviour ensures that the calcium used to create the eggs is not lost. It is unknown if other species do this, but it is a common behaviour among birds. As with the incubation, both parents are involved in rearing the chicks. The chicks of pittas are entirely altricial, hatching both naked and blind, and dependent upon their parents for warmth, food and nest sanitation. Young chicks are brooded continuously, the female brooding alone in some species and sharing responsibilities with the male in others. The males and females make regular feeding trips to the chicks; one study of Gurney's pittas found a pair made 2300 feeding visits to the nest, traveling an estimated 460 km (290 mi) over the nestling stage. Earthworms are important food items for many species, and the dominant item in the nestling diet of some. 73% of the parental visits of fairy pittas, 63% of rainbow pitta's, up to 79% of Gurney's pitta's visits involved bringing earthworms. Parents can and do carry more than one item in their bills during visits; in a study of breeding fairy pittas, as many as six items were observed being brought in a single visit; less than four was more typical. When the chicks are small, prey may be broken up before being fed to the chicks, and larger prey items like skinks and snakes are only fed to chicks who are old enough to manage them.

== Relationship with humans ==
The brilliant plumage of many pittas has resulted in considerable interest in pittas from people living within their range, scientists, aviculturists and birdwatchers, and has led to the colloquial name jewel-thrushes. Such is their attractiveness that, in Borneo, even the body of a dead pitta can be a favoured toy for local children. They have proven difficult to maintain and breed in captivity, requiring large amounts of space, humidity and sufficient vegetation of the right kind. Pittas are a very popular group of birds with birdwatchers, due to the dazzling plumage of many species and the relative difficulty of seeing these retiring birds in dark forests. Their desirability as birdwatching targets was the subject of the book The Jewel Hunter (2013), in which the writer Chris Goodie recounted his attempt to see every species of pitta.

=== Status and conservation ===
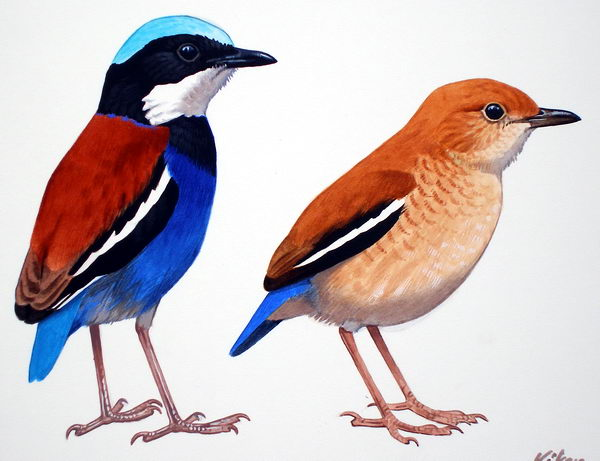
Blue-headed pittas (male left, female right) are threatened by rapid deforestation in Borneo

Pittas are generally forest birds and, as such, are vulnerable to habitat loss caused by rapid deforestation. They can also be difficult birds to survey and are easily overlooked. Four species are assessed to be endangered, and a further nine are listed as vulnerable by the IUCN. Eight species are listed as near-threatened, and one, the Louisiade pitta, is too poorly known to be assessed and is listed as data deficient.

The Gurney's pitta was not seen for 34 years between 1952 and 1986, before a small population was discovered in southern Thailand. This small population declined after its rediscovery, and, by 2000, it had reached a low of 10 pairs, and was listed as critically endangered. In 2003, the species was found in Burma for the first time since 1914, and in large numbers, between nine and thirty five thousand pairs. The species was considerably less threatened than thought, but it is still of considerable conservation concern, as deforestation of the habitat in Burma continues. The rapid rate of deforestation in Borneo has pushed the blue-headed pitta, considered common and secure as recently as 1996, into the list of species considered vulnerable.

Pittas have been targeted by poachers for the illegal wild-bird trade. They are not targeted because of their song, as many songbirds are, and may simply be captured as bycatch from collecting other species, and because of their attractive plumage. According to some trappers, they also may end up being eaten for food. On Manus, locals report that predation by snakes, including the brown tree snake, is responsible for the rarity of the endangered superb pitta, but the snake, the introduction of which is responsible for several extinctions of island birds across the Pacific, is native to the island, and is therefore likely a natural threat.

== Species of pitta ==
There are 46 species of pitta in three genera according to the International Ornithological Congress' (IOC) Birds of the World: Recommended English Names.

Image	Genus	Living species
	Hydrornis Blyth, 1843	Eared pitta, Hydrornis phayrei; Blue-naped pitta, Hydrornis nipalensis; Blue-rumped pitta, Hydrornis soror; Rusty-naped pitta, Hydrornis oatesi; Schneider's pitta, Hydrornis schneideri; Giant pitta, Hydrornis caerulea; Blue-headed pitta, Hydrornis baudii; Blue pitta, Hydrornis cyanea; Bar-bellied pitta, Hydrornis elliotii; Javan banded pitta, Hydrornis guajana; Malayan banded pitta, Hydrornis irena; Bornean banded pitta, Hydrornis schwaneri; Gurney's pitta, Hydrornis gurneyi
	Erythropitta Bonaparte, 1854	Whiskered pitta, Erythropitta kochi; Philippine pitta, Erythropitta erythrogaster; Sula pitta, Erythropitta dohertyi; Sulawesi pitta, Erythropitta celebensis; South Moluccan pitta, Erythropitta rubrinucha; North Moluccan pitta, Erythropitta rufiventris; Louisiade pitta, Erythropitta meeki; Bismarck pitta, Erythropitta novaehibernicae; Papuan pitta, Erythropitta macklotii; Blue-banded pitta, Erythropitta arcuata; Garnet pitta, Erythropitta granatina; Black-crowned pitta, Erythropitta ussheri; Graceful pitta, Erythropitta venusta
	Pitta Vieillot, 1816	African pitta, Pitta angolensis; Green-breasted pitta, Pitta reichenowi; Indian pitta, Pitta brachyura; Blue-winged pitta, Pitta moluccensis; Fairy pitta, Pitta nympha; Nicobar hooded pitta, Pitta abbotti; Western hooded pitta, Pitta sordida; Minahasa hooded pitta, Pitta forsteni; Eastern hooded pitta, Pitta novaeguineae; Biak hooded pitta, Pitta rosenbergii; Azure-breasted pitta, Pitta steerii; Noisy pitta, Pitta versicolor; Ivory-breasted pitta, Pitta maxima; Ornate pitta, Pitta concinna; Elegant pitta, Pitta elegans; Banda sea pitta, Pitta vigorsii; Black-faced pitta, Pitta anerythra; Mangrove pitta, Pitta megarhyncha; Superb pitta, Pitta superba; Rainbow pitta, Pitta iris
