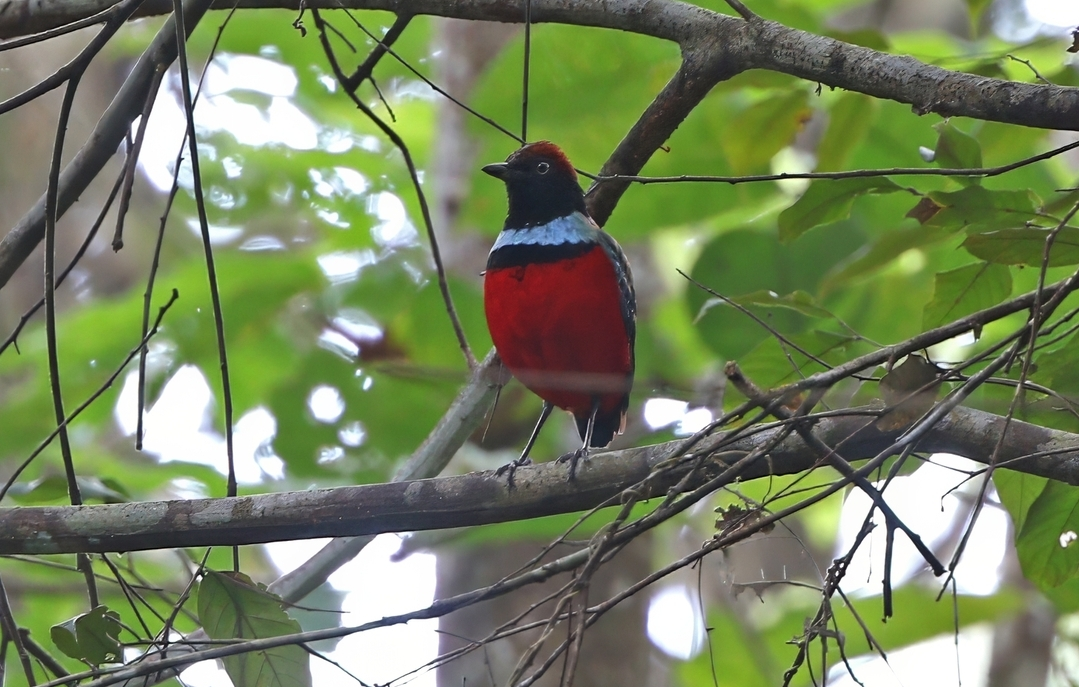

Conservation status
- Least Concern (IUCN 3.1)

Scientific classification
- Kingdom: Animalia
- Phylum: Chordata
- Class: Aves
- Order: Passeriformes
- Family: Pittidae
- Genus: Erythropitta
- Species: E. dohertyi

Binomial name
- Erythropitta dohertyi (Rothschild, 1898)

Synonyms
- Erythropitta erythrogaster dohertyi

= Sula pitta =

Species of bird

The Sula pitta (Erythropitta dohertyi) is a species of the pitta. It was considered a subspecies of the red-bellied pitta. It is endemic to Indonesia where it occurs in the Sula and Banggai Islands. Its natural habitat is subtropical or tropical moist lowland forests. It is threatened by habitat loss.
