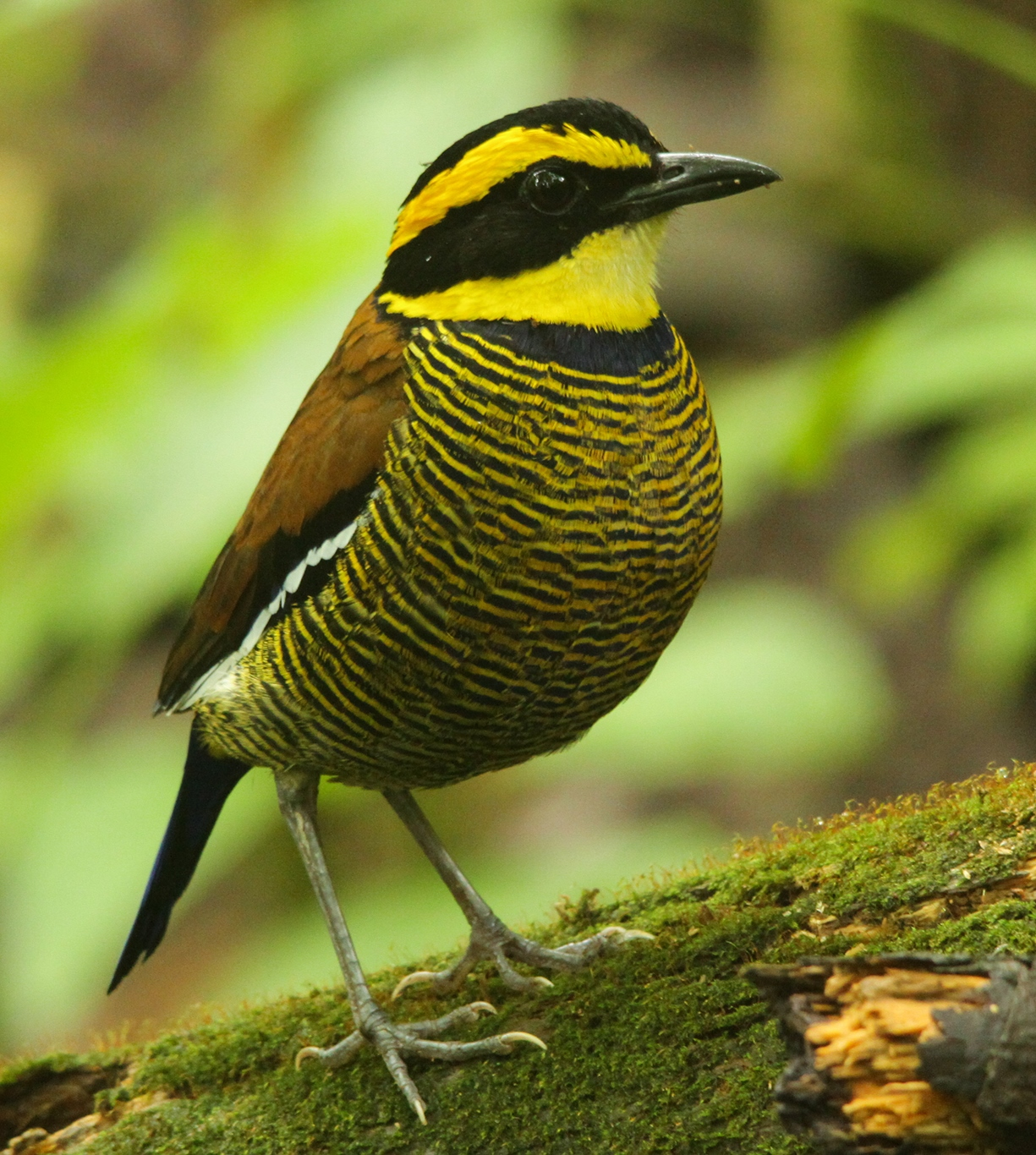
- Male Javan banded pitta, Hydrornis guajanus

Scientific classification
- Kingdom: Animalia
- Phylum: Chordata
- Class: Aves
- Order: Passeriformes
- Family: Pittidae
- Genus: Hydrornis; Blyth, 1843

Species
- See text.

= Hydrornis =

Genus of birds

Hydrornis is a genus of pitta in the family Pittidae. The genus contains thirteen species, found in South-east Asia. The genus was formerly merged with the genus Pitta, but a 2006 study split the family into three genera.

== Taxonomy ==
The pittas were at one time all usually placed in the genus Pitta, the only genus in the family Pittidae, but when a 2006 molecular phylogenetic study found that the pittas formed three separate groups, the genus was split and some species were moved into two resurrected genera, Erythropitta and Hydrornis. The genus Hydrornis had been introduced by the English zoologist Edward Blyth in 1843 with the blue-naped pitta (Hydrornis nipalensis) as the type species. The name Hydrornis combines the Ancient Greek words hudōr "water" and ornis "bird".

The pittas in Hydrornis have sexually dimorphic plumage, a feature that is absent for all other pittas. Also for those species that have been studied, the juveniles have a spotted cryptic plumage.

== Species ==
The genus contains 13 species:

Image	Scientific name	Common name	Distribution
	Hydrornis phayrei	Eared pitta	Southeast Asia.
	Hydrornis nipalensis	Blue-naped pitta	Bangladesh, Bhutan, China, India, Laos, Myanmar, Nepal, and Vietnam.
	Hydrornis soror	Blue-rumped pitta	Cambodia, China, Laos, Thailand, and Vietnam
	Hydrornis oatesi	Rusty-naped pitta	China, Laos, Malaysia, Myanmar, Thailand, and Vietnam.
	Hydrornis schneideri	Schneider's pitta	Sumatra in Indonesia
	Hydrornis caeruleus	Giant pitta	Brunei, Indonesia, Malaysia, Myanmar, and Thailand.
	Hydrornis baudii	Blue-headed pitta	Borneo
	Hydrornis cyaneus	Blue pitta	Bangladesh, Bhutan, Cambodia, India, Laos, Myanmar, Thailand, and Vietnam.
	Hydrornis elliotii	Bar-bellied pitta	Cambodia, Laos, Thailand, and Vietnam
	Hydrornis gurneyi	Gurney's pitta	Malay Peninsula
	Hydrornis guajanus	Javan banded pitta	Java and Bali
	Hydrornis irena	Malayan banded pitta	Thailand, the Malay Peninsula and Sumatra.
	Hydrornis schwaneri	Bornean banded pitta	Borneo
