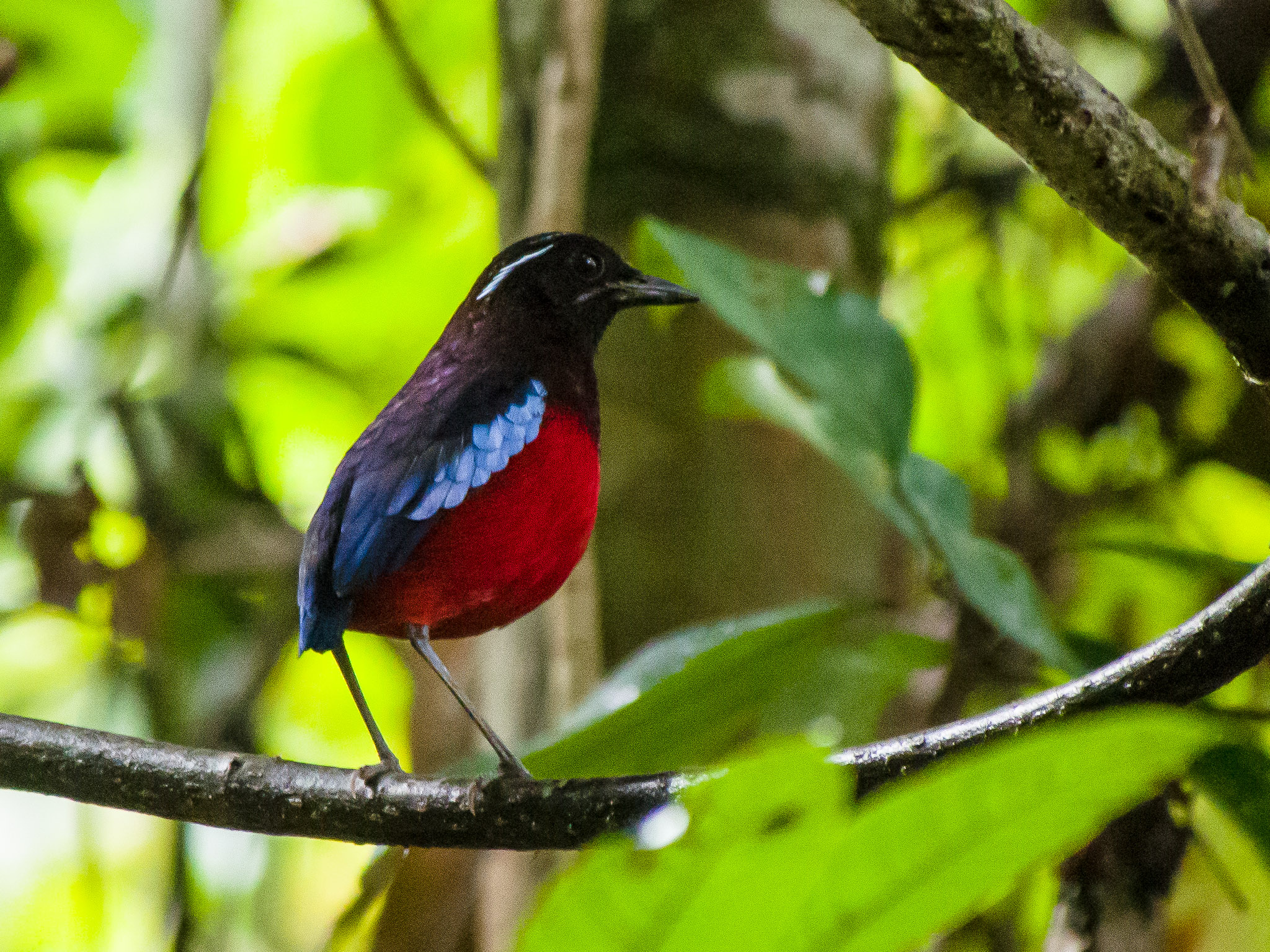
- Black-crowned pitta, Erythropitta ussheri

Scientific classification
- Kingdom: Animalia
- Phylum: Chordata
- Class: Aves
- Order: Passeriformes
- Family: Pittidae
- Genus: Erythropitta; Bonaparte, 1854

Species
- See text.

= Erythropitta =

Genus of birds

Black-crowned pitta (E. ussheri) uttering whistles from a perch in Danum Valley, Sabah

Erythropitta is a genus of birds in the pitta family Pittidae. The members of the genus are found mostly in Southeast Asia, with one species, the Papuan pitta, ranging into northeast Australia. The genus was formerly merged with the large genus Pitta, but based on the results of a molecular phylogenetic study published in 2006, the family Pittidae has been split into three genera.

== Taxonomy ==
The pittas were at one time all usually placed in the genus Pitta, the only genus in the family Pittidae, but when a 2006 molecular phylogenetic study found that the pittas formed three separate groups, the genus was split and some species were moved into two resurrected genera, Erythropitta and Hydrornis. The genus Erythropitta had been introduced in 1854 by the French naturalist Charles Lucien Bonaparte. The type species was subsequently designated as the Papuan pitta (Erythropitta macklotii). The name Erythropitta combines the Ancient Greek word eruthros "red" with the genus name Pitta.

Pittas in this genus have red or crimson coloured underparts, greenish or blueish backs and short tails. They are mostly small in size.

== Species ==
The genus contains the following 13 species:

| Image | Scientific name | Common name | Distribution |
|---|---|---|---|
| | Erythropitta kochi | Whiskered pitta | Luzon in the Philippines. |
| | Erythropitta erythrogaster | Philippine pitta | Philippines. |
| | Erythropitta dohertyi | Sula pitta | Sula and Banggai Islands |
| | Erythropitta celebensis | Sulawesi pitta | Sulawesi, Manterawu, and Togian Islands |
| | Erythropitta rubrinucha | South Moluccan pitta | Indonesia on Buru and Seram. |
| | Erythropitta rufiventris | North Moluccan pitta | northern Moluccas |
| | Erythropitta meeki | Louisiade pitta | Louisiade Archipelago in Papua New Guinea |
| | Erythropitta novaehibernicae | Bismarck pitta | New Ireland Province in Papua New Guinea |
| | Erythropitta macklotii | Papuan pitta | Aru Islands, New Guinea |
| | Erythropitta arquata | Blue-banded pitta | Borneo |
| | Erythropitta granatina | Garnet pitta | Brunei, Indonesia, Malaysia, Myanmar, Singapore, and Thailand. |
| | Erythropitta venusta | Graceful pitta | Sumatra, Indonesia |
| | Erythropitta ussheri | Black-crowned pitta | Sabah in northern Borneo |
