= Louisiade pitta =

Conservation status
- Data Deficient (IUCN 3.1)

Scientific classification
- Kingdom: Animalia
- Phylum: Chordata
- Class: Aves
- Order: Passeriformes
- Family: Pittidae
- Genus: Erythropitta
- Species: E. meeki

Binomial name
- Erythropitta meeki (Rothschild, 1898)

Synonyms
- Erythropitta erythrogaster meeki

Species of bird

The Louisiade pitta (Erythropitta meeki) is a species of the pitta. It was considered a subspecies of the red-bellied pitta. It is endemic to Rossel Island in the Louisiade Archipelago in Papua New Guinea. Its natural habitat is subtropical or tropical moist lowland forests. It may be threatened by habitat loss, but is currently listed by the IUCN as Data Deficient as there have been no definite records since the type specimen was collected in 1898. However an expedition to the island in 2014 revealed that local people said they still encountered it. In 2022, British tourist Michael Smith found two alive individuals with clear photograph evidence.
