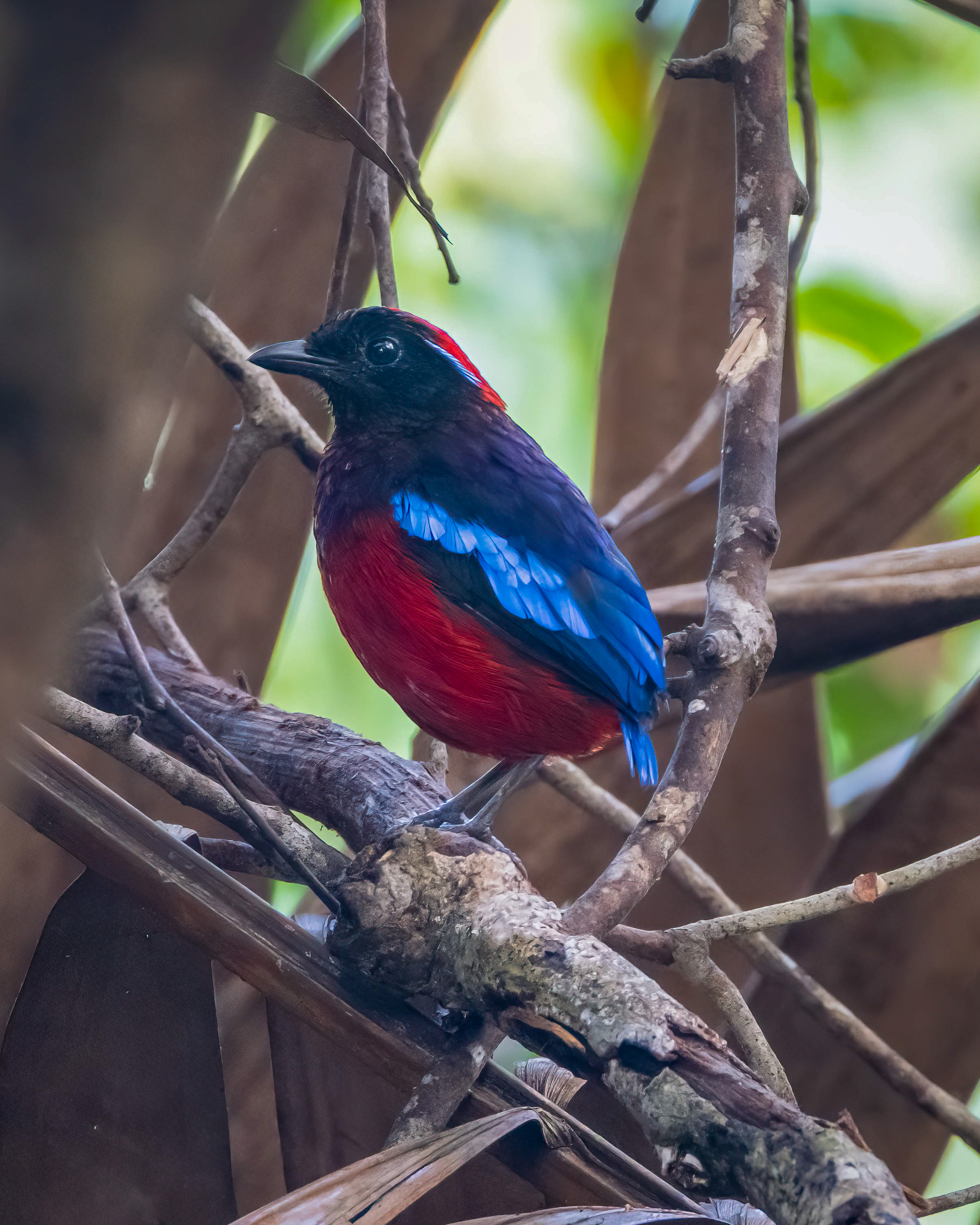
- Adult

Conservation status
- Near Threatened (IUCN 3.1)

Scientific classification
- Kingdom: Animalia
- Phylum: Chordata
- Class: Aves
- Order: Passeriformes
- Family: Pittidae
- Genus: Erythropitta
- Species: E. granatina

Binomial name
- Erythropitta granatina (Temminck, 1830)

Synonyms
- Pitta granatina

= Garnet pitta =

Species of bird

The garnet pitta (Erythropitta granatina) is a species of bird in the family Pittidae. It is found in Brunei, Indonesia, Malaysia, Myanmar, Singapore, and Thailand. Its natural habitat is subtropical or tropical moist lowland forest. It is threatened by habitat loss. The form occurring in the Malaysian state of Sabah has been split as the black-crowned pitta (Erythropitta ussheri).

== Diet ==
The garnet pitta is an insectivore, feeding mainly on ants, wood grubs, cockroaches, and beetles.

== Characteristics ==
The Garnet pitta is about 17 cm long. The bird has a black head with a bright blue stripe at the eyebrows and a red cap. The breast is dark blue at the top, and carmine red beneath. The back and wings are bright blue. Juvenile pittas have a mostly brown color (see illustration).

== Breeding ==
Pairs mate between March and August. A pair will lay a clutch of two eggs.

== Status ==
The Garnet pitta is considered as near threatened on the IUCN red list. Its natural habitat is threatened by systematic illegal deforestation and damaging forest fires.
