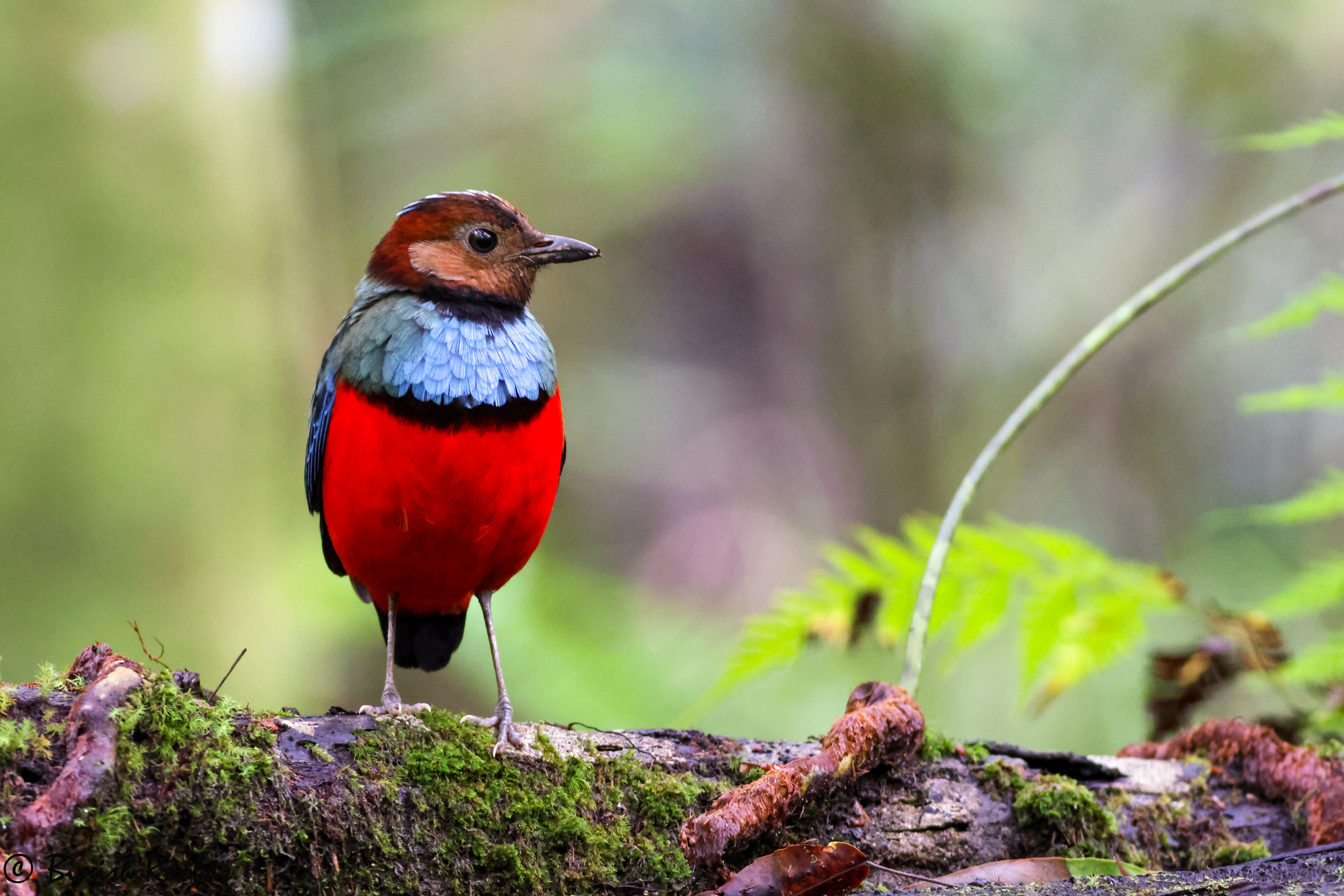

Conservation status
- Least Concern (IUCN 3.1)

Scientific classification
- Kingdom: Animalia
- Phylum: Chordata
- Class: Aves
- Order: Passeriformes
- Family: Pittidae
- Genus: Erythropitta
- Species: E. celebensis

Binomial name
- Erythropitta celebensis (Müller, S & Schlegel, 1845)

Synonyms
- Erythropitta erythrogaster celebensis

= Sulawesi pitta =

Species of bird

The Sulawesi pitta (Erythropitta celebensis) is a species of pitta. It was considered a subspecies of the red-bellied pitta. It is endemic to Indonesia where it occurs in Sulawesi, Manterawu, and Togian Islands. Its natural habitat is subtropical or tropical moist lowland forest. It is threatened by habitat loss.

== Taxonomy ==
The Sulawesi pitta was formally described in 1845 by the German naturalists Salomon Müller and Hermann Schlegel based on a specimen collected by the Dutch narualist Eltio Alegondas Forsten near Tondano on the island of Sulawesi in Indonesia. They placed the species in the genus Pitta and coined the binomial name Pitta celebensis, where the specific epithet is a former name for Sulawesi. The Sulawesi pitta is now placed in the genus Erythropitta that was introduced in 1854 by Charles Lucien Bonaparte.

Three subspecies are recognised:

- E. c. celebensis (Müller, S & Schlegel, 1845) – Sulawesi, including Manterawu (=Mantehage; northwest of northeast Sulawesi), Togian Islands (between northeast and central east Sulawesi) and Buton (also Batung, south of southeast Sulawesi)
- E. c. palliceps (Brüggemann, 1876) – Siau Island and Tahulandang (northeast of Sulawesi, formerly considered as a separate species, the Siau pitta)
- E. c. caeruleitorques (Salvadori, 1876) – Sangihe Islands (northeast of Sulawesi, formerly considered as a separate species, the Sangihe pitta))

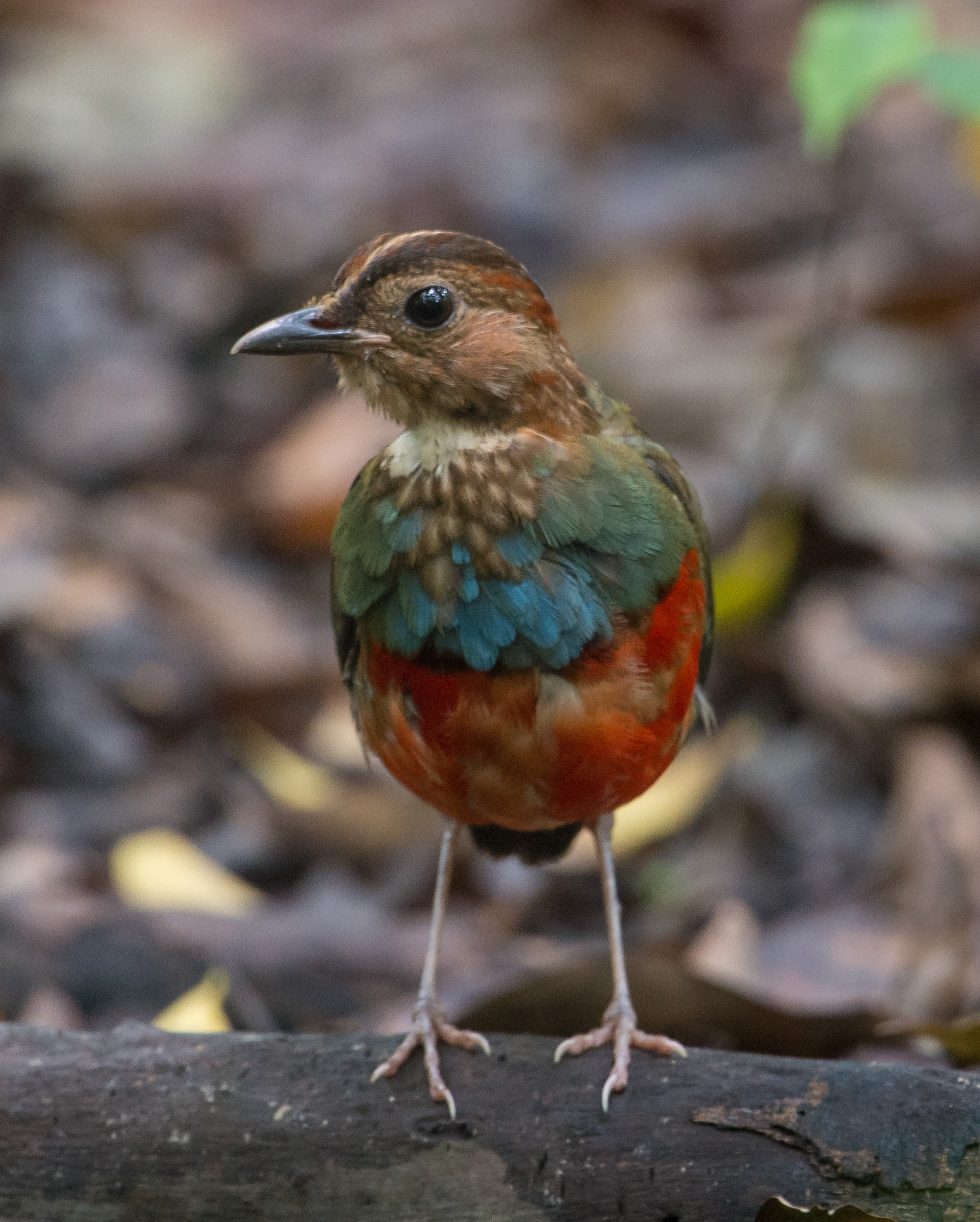
Juvenile at Tangkoko, Sulawesi
