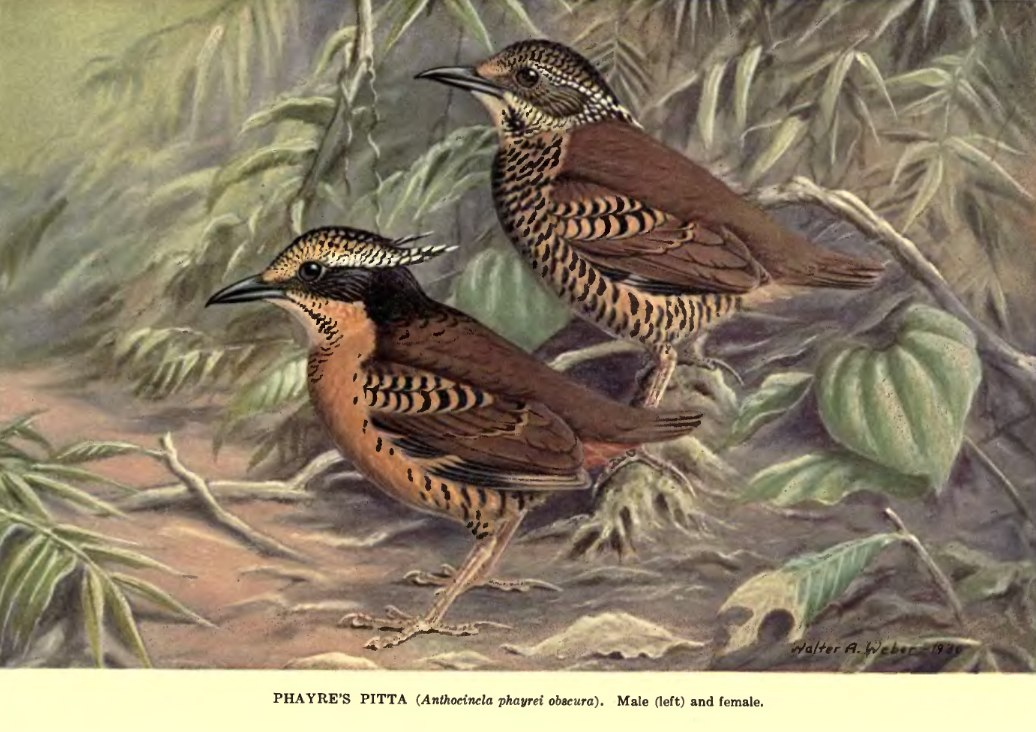
- adult male and female
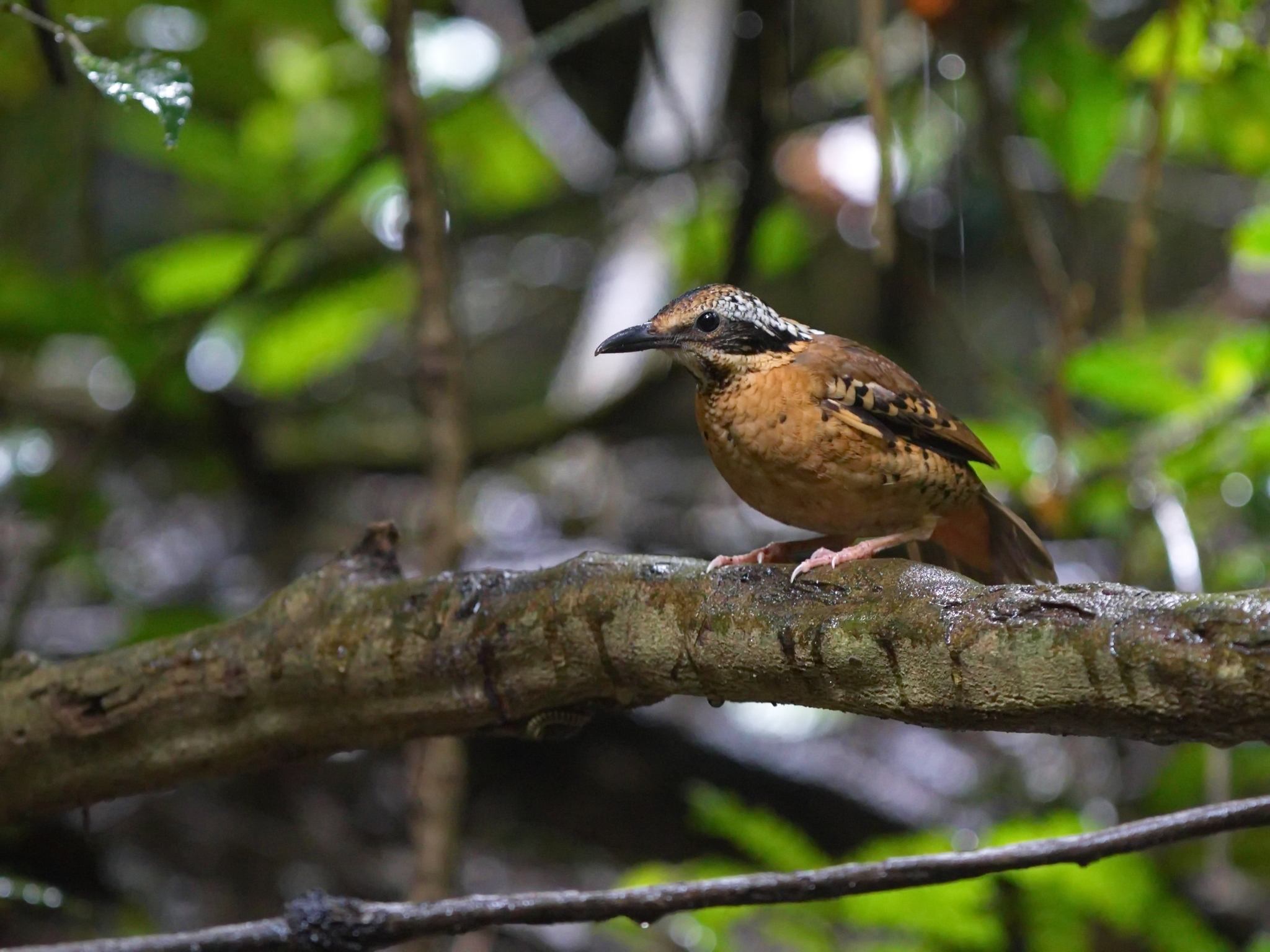

Conservation status
- Least Concern (IUCN 3.1)

Scientific classification
- Kingdom: Animalia
- Phylum: Chordata
- Class: Aves
- Order: Passeriformes
- Family: Pittidae
- Genus: Hydrornis
- Species: H. phayrei

Binomial name
- Hydrornis phayrei (Blyth, 1862)

Synonyms
- Anthocincla phayrei Blyth, 1862; Pitta phayrei (Blyth, 1863)

= Eared pitta =

Species of bird

The eared pitta (Hydrornis phayrei) is a species of bird in the pitta family, Pittidae, and is found in Southeast Asia.

== Description ==
It has formerly been placed into its own genus, Anthocincla, on account of its apparent primitive characteristics. It is the only species in the Pitta family with entirely cryptic colours in the adults of both sexes. As with other Hydrornis species, they exhibit sexually dimorphic plumage, and a cryptic juvenile plumage.

The adult male has a central black line over the crown, reaching and covering the nape. The plumage either side of this is rufescent buff, with feathers margined black besides having a black bar near their bases. The lores, sides of face and nape are black. The supercilium ends in lengthened pointed feathers, white and barred black, which protrude up to an inch beyond the occiput. The upper part plumage, wings and tail are all rufescent brown. Primaries with their greater coverts are blackish brown, except for a buff bar at the base of the primaries. The chin and middle of throat are white. Sides of throat, flanks and abdomen are however ferruginous brown; the sides of throat and flanks also spotted black. The undertail-coverts pale vermilion. The bill is black, but the mandible reddish brown at the gape. The iris is deep brown; the feet and claws flesh-coloured.

The female has her breast and sides more densely spotted with black; the ear-coverts, head and occiput plumage of the same colour as the mantle and back, but the ear-coverts are pencilled with black. The lengthened superciliary feathers are shorter than that of the male, and less pure white; the under tail-coverts paler. In other respects the female plumage resembles that of the male.

== Habitat ==
Its natural habitats are subtropical or tropical moist lowland forest and subtropical or tropical moist montane forest.

== Status ==
The global population size has not been quantified, but the species is reported to be rare or very rare in most localities though occasionally locally common.

This species has a very large range, and hence does not approach the thresholds for vulnerable under the range size criterion (extent of occurrence <20,000 km2 combined with a declining or fluctuating range size, habitat extent/quality, or population size and a small number of locations or severe fragmentation). The population trend appears to be stable, and hence the species does not approach the thresholds for vulnerable under the population trend criterion (>30% decline over ten years or three generations). The population size has not been quantified, but it is not believed to approach the thresholds for vulnerable under the population size criterion (<10,000 mature individuals with a continuing decline estimated to be >10% in ten years or three generations, or with a specified population structure. For these reasons the species is evaluated as least concern.
