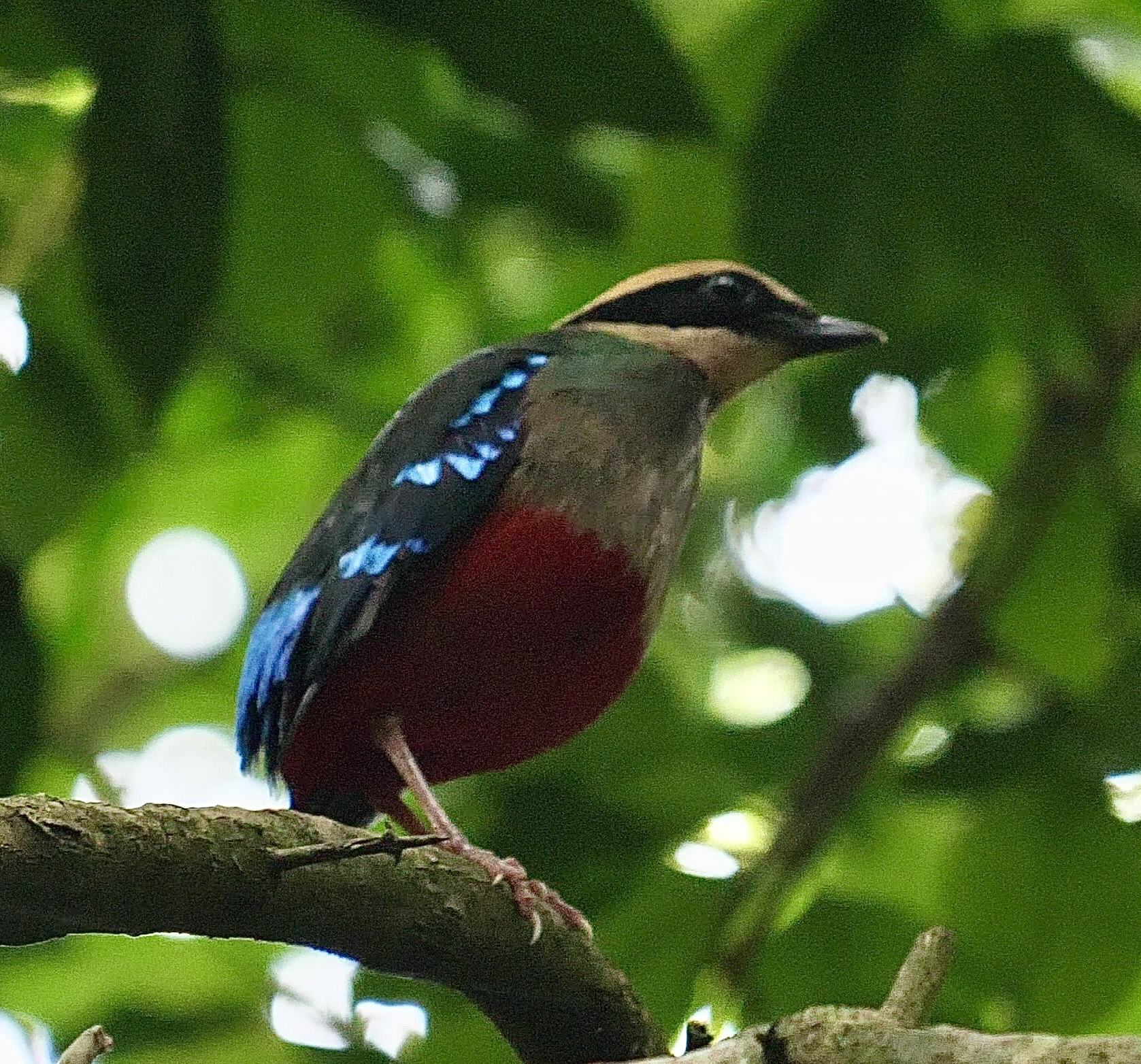

Conservation status
- Least Concern (IUCN 3.1)

Scientific classification
- Kingdom: Animalia
- Phylum: Chordata
- Class: Aves
- Order: Passeriformes
- Family: Pittidae
- Genus: Pitta
- Species: P. reichenowi

Binomial name
- Pitta reichenowi Madarász, 1901

= Green-breasted pitta =

Species of bird

The green-breasted pitta (Pitta reichenowi) is a species of bird in the family Pittidae. It is one of only two Pitta species in Africa, and is found in deep forest of the tropics.

== Description ==
The plumage is very similar to that of the African pitta, but the breast is green and the throat is bordered by a black line. Immatures have duller, darker plumage, and a brownish olive breast.

== Range ==
It is found in Cameroon, Central African Republic, Republic of the Congo, DRC, Gabon, and Uganda. Its natural habitat is subtropical or tropical moist lowland forest. In Uganda however, it occurs at altitudes between 1,000 and 1,400 metres (3,300 and 4,600 ft).

== Gallery ==
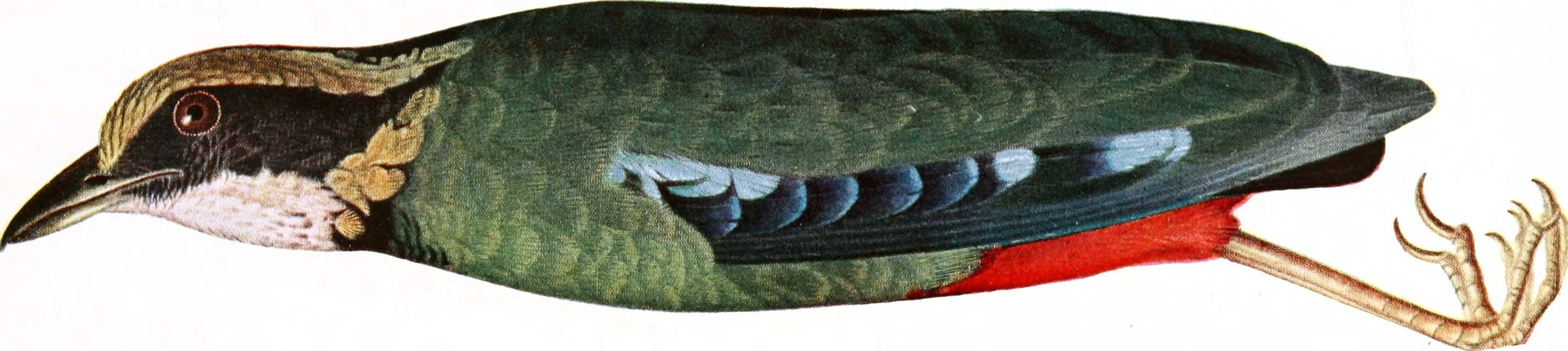
Specimen from Beni-Mawambi, northeastern DRC, in the Vienna Natural History Museum (illustration by Max Jaffé)

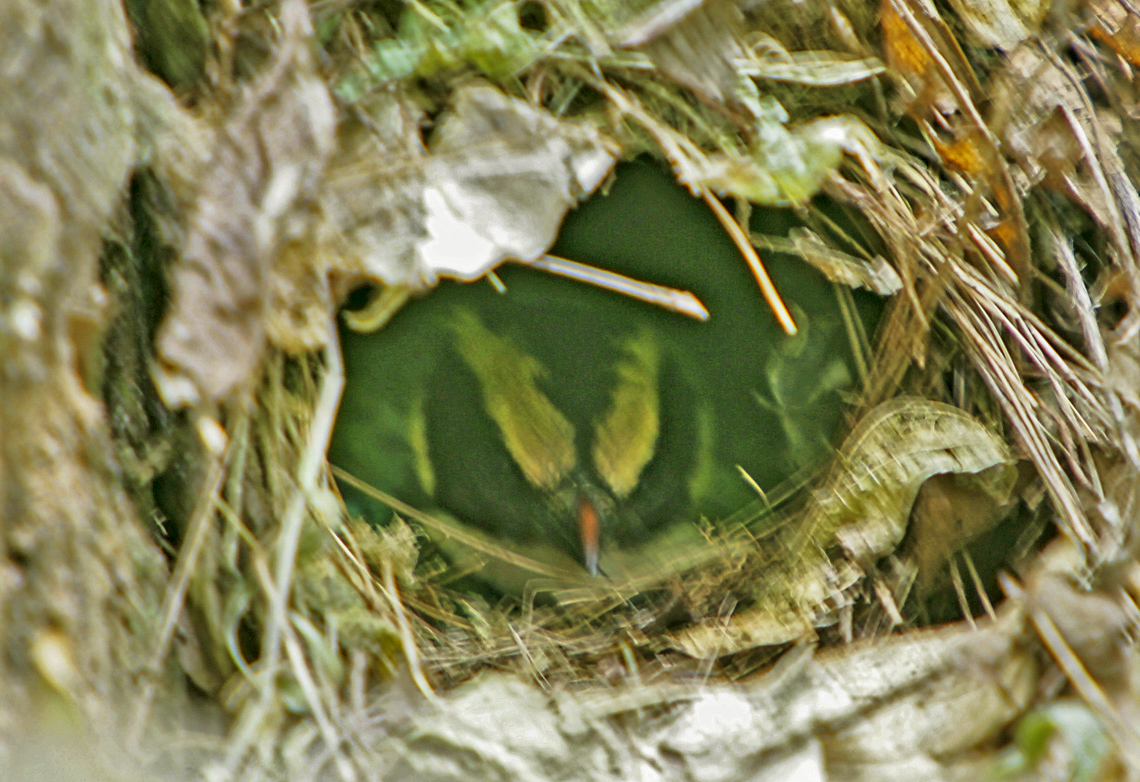
An incubating bird in its domed nest, Uganda
