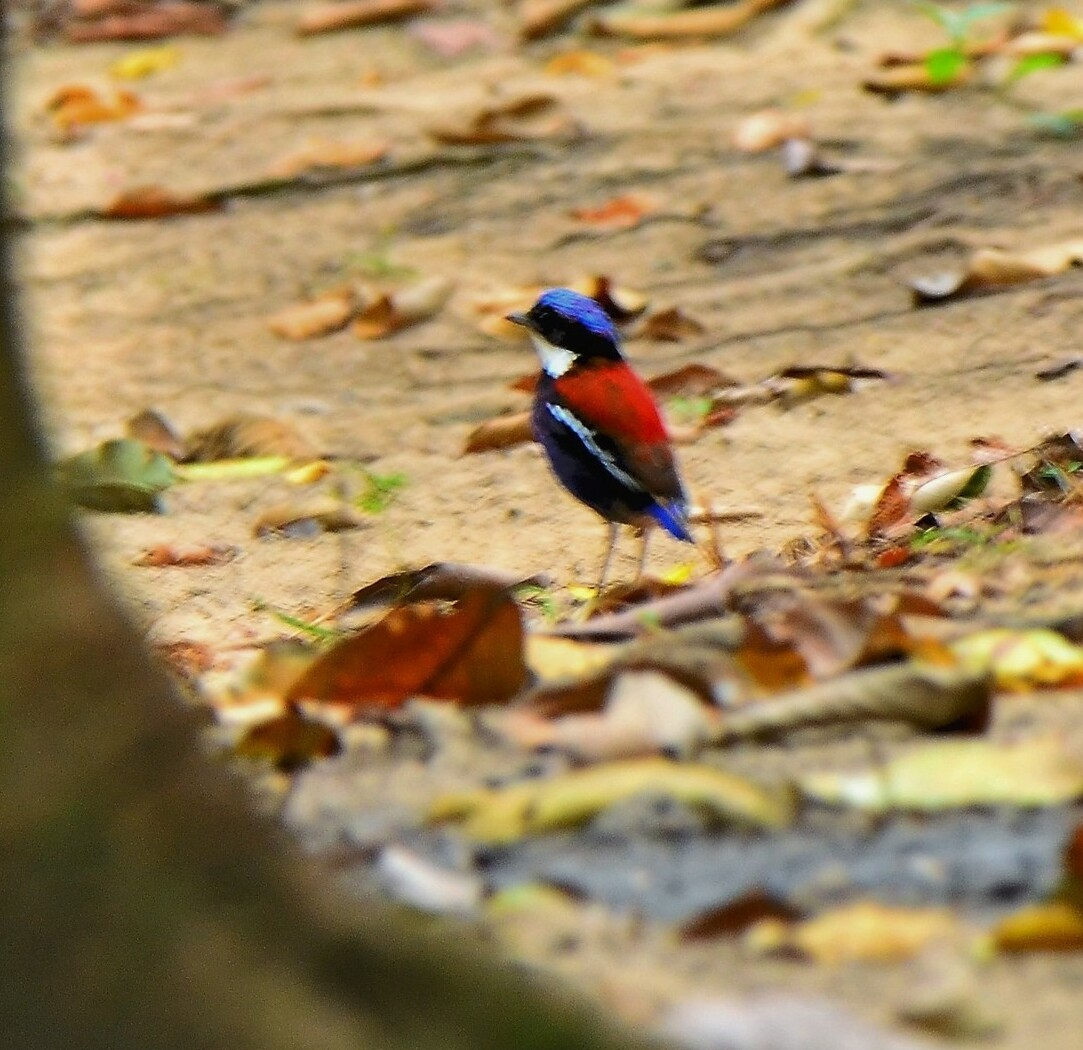
- Male
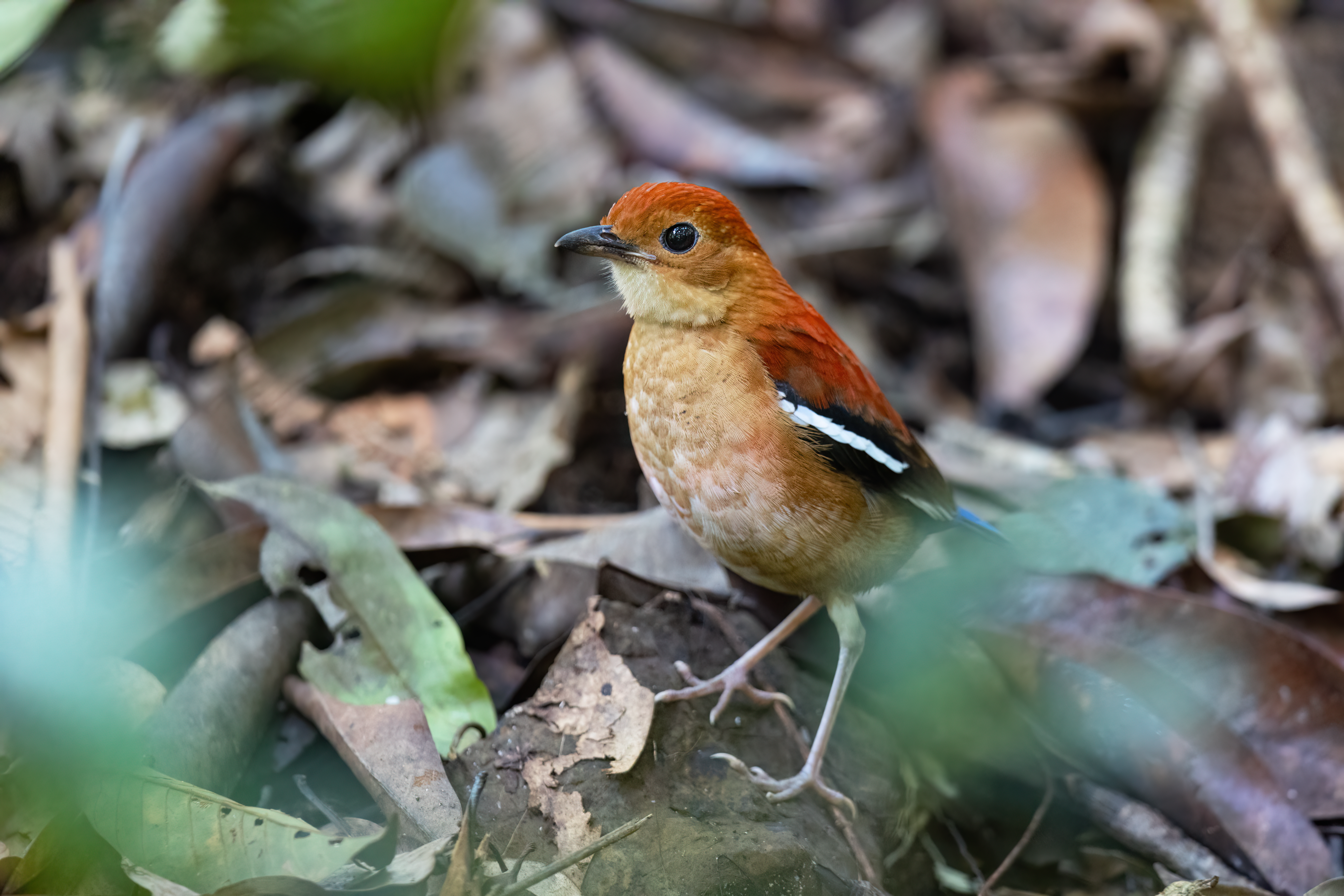
- Female

Conservation status
- Vulnerable (IUCN 3.1)

Scientific classification
- Kingdom: Animalia
- Phylum: Chordata
- Class: Aves
- Order: Passeriformes
- Family: Pittidae
- Genus: Hydrornis
- Species: H. baudii

Binomial name
- Hydrornis baudii (Müller, S & Schlegel, 1839)
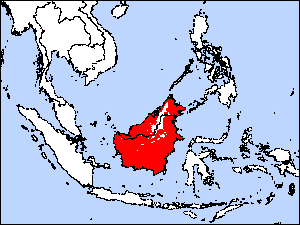

Synonyms
- Pitta baudii

= Blue-headed pitta =

Species of bird

The blue-headed pitta (Hydrornis baudii) is a species of bird in the pitta family Pittidae. It is endemic to Borneo.

== Description ==
The blue-headed pitta is a medium-sized pitta, at 17 cm (6.7 in) in length. The plumage of the male is very brightly coloured, with a bright blue crown, black cheeks, white throat, chestnut red back, violet blue tail and belly, and black wings marked with white. The colours of the female are more subdued, with a buff coloured back and head and blue only being found on the tail.

== Breeding ==
The blue-headed pitta is believed to be a seasonal breeder, as birds in breeding condition have been found in the middle of the year (March to June) and a female that was about to lay was found in July. Young birds were also found in nests between May and October. The nest is typical of the family, a round dome of leaves with a side entrance near or on the ground. In the one nest examined two eggs were found.

== Distribution and habitat ==
The species is endemic to the island of Borneo, where it occurs in Brunei, Kalimantan (Indonesia), Sarawak and Sabah (Malaysia). Its natural habitat is tropical lowland evergreen forests. While it does occur in disturbed of secondary forests, it is most common in primary forest. It usually occurs below 600 m (2,000 ft), it has been recorded up to 1,200 m (3,900 ft), but this record has not been verified.

=== Status and conservation ===
It is considered to be threatened by habitat loss, as the forest cover of Borneo is being lost at a rapid rate.
