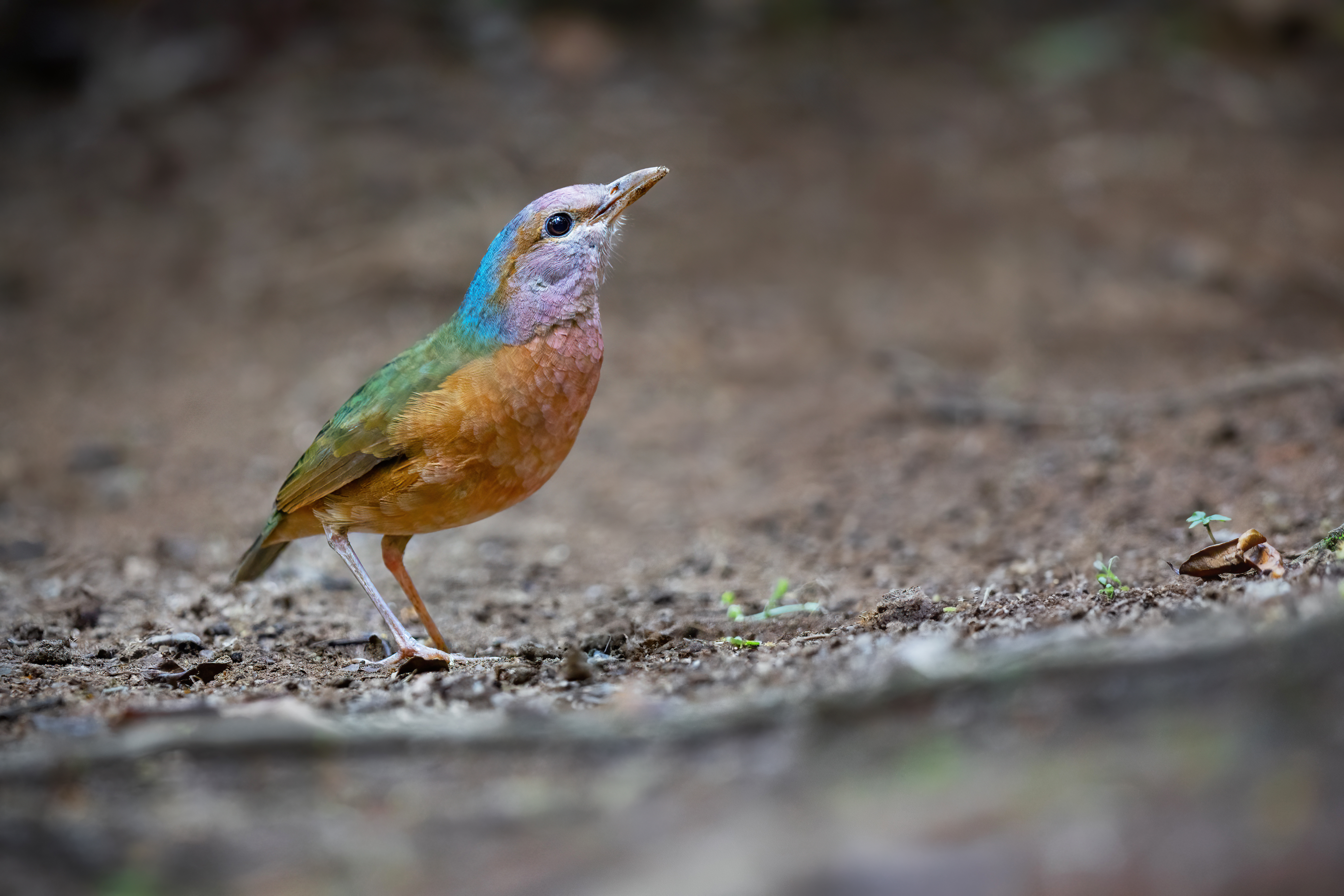

Conservation status
- Least Concern (IUCN 3.1)

Scientific classification
- Kingdom: Animalia
- Phylum: Chordata
- Class: Aves
- Order: Passeriformes
- Family: Pittidae
- Genus: Hydrornis
- Species: H. soror

Binomial name
- Hydrornis soror (Wardlaw-Ramsay, R.G., 1881)

Synonyms
- Pitta soror

= Blue-rumped pitta =

Species of bird

The blue-rumped pitta (Hydrornis soror) is a species of bird in the family Pittidae. It is found in Cambodia, China, Laos, Thailand, and Vietnam. Its natural habitats are subtropical or tropical seasonal forest and subtropical or tropical moist montane forest.

== Taxonomy ==
The blue-rumped pitta was described by the English naturalist Robert George Wardlaw-Ramsay in 1881 from a specimen collected in Saigon, Cochinchina. He introduced the binomial name Pitta (Hydrornis) soror with Hydrornis as a subgenus. The specific epithet soror is Latin for "sister" (that is "closely related").

Five subspecies are recognised:

- H. s. tonkinensis (Delacour, 1927) – south China and north Vietnam
- H. s. douglasi (Ogilvie-Grant, 1910) – Hainan island (off southeast China)
- H. s. petersi (Delacour, 1934) – central Laos and north central Vietnam
- H. s. soror (Wardlaw-Ramsay, RG, 1881) – south Laos and central and south Vietnam
- H. s. flynnstonei (Frank Rozendaal, 1993) – east Thailand and south Cambodia
