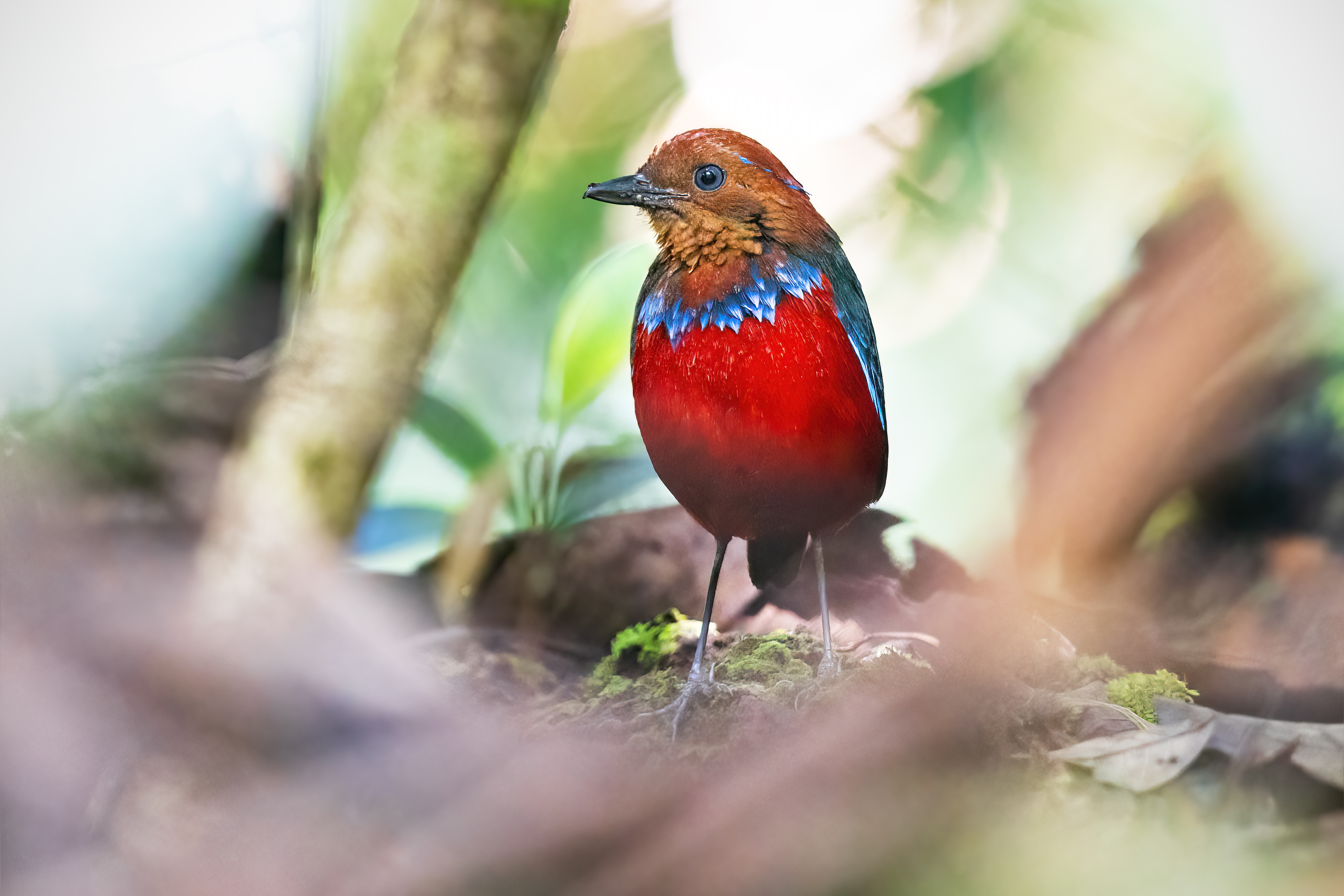

Conservation status
- Least Concern (IUCN 3.1)

Scientific classification
- Kingdom: Animalia
- Phylum: Chordata
- Class: Aves
- Order: Passeriformes
- Family: Pittidae
- Genus: Erythropitta
- Species: E. arquata

Binomial name
- Erythropitta arquata (Gould, 1871)
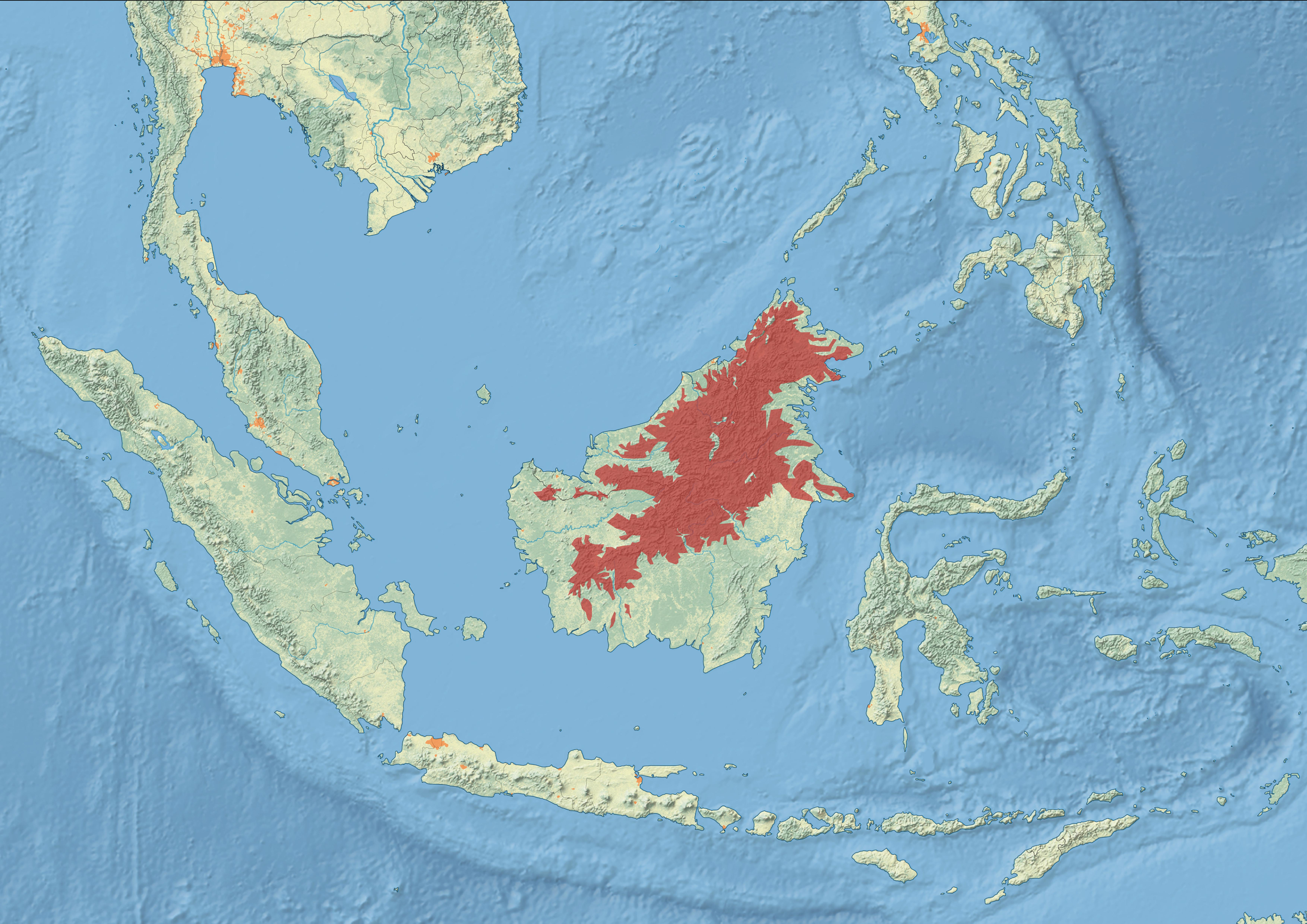
- Range of the blue-banded pitta

Synonyms
- Pitta arquata; Pitta arcuata

= Blue-banded pitta =

Species of bird

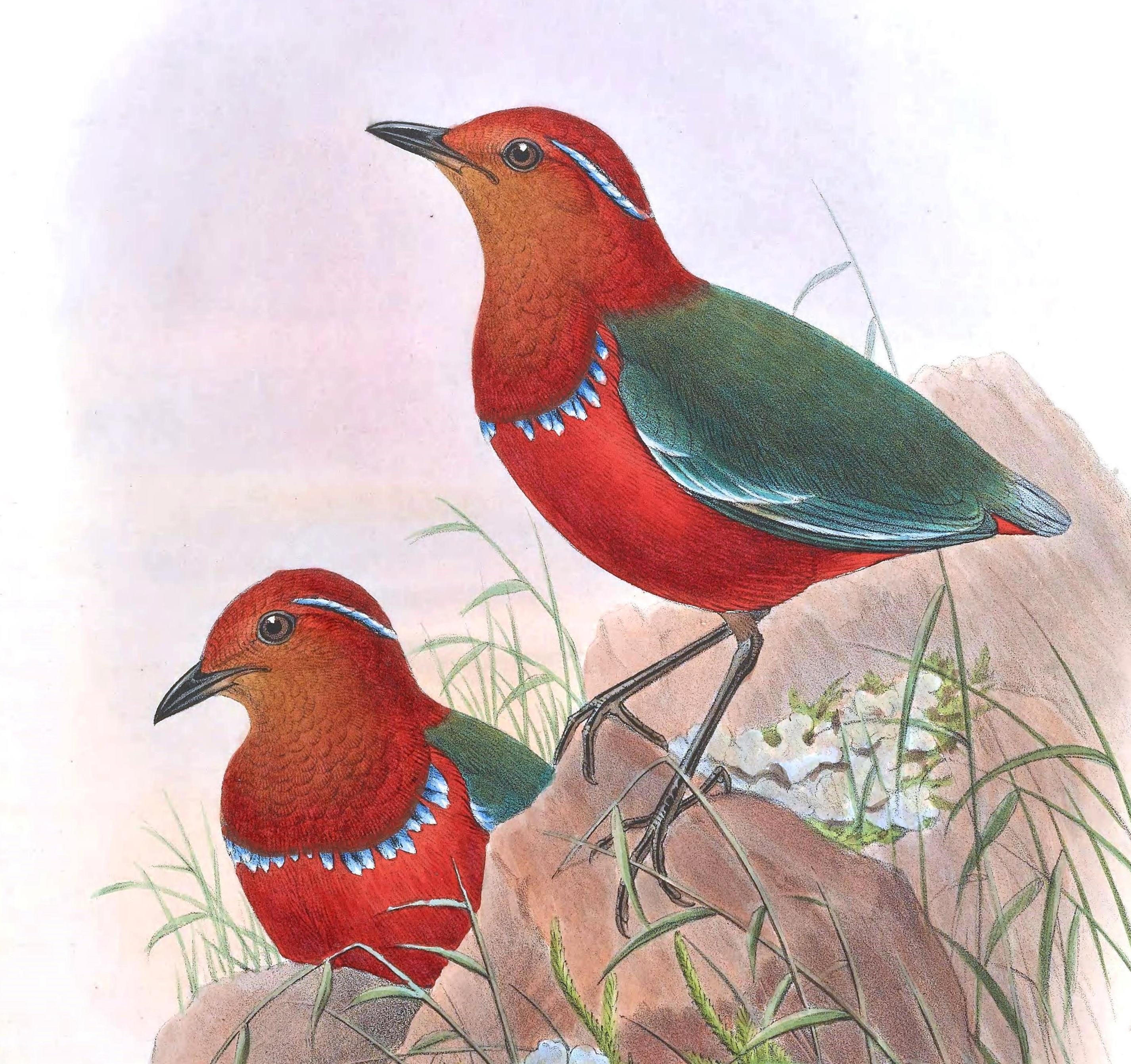
Illustration by Gould & Richter

The blue-banded pitta (Erythropitta arquata) is a species of bird in the family Pittidae. It is native to lowlands of the Borneo montane rain forests.
