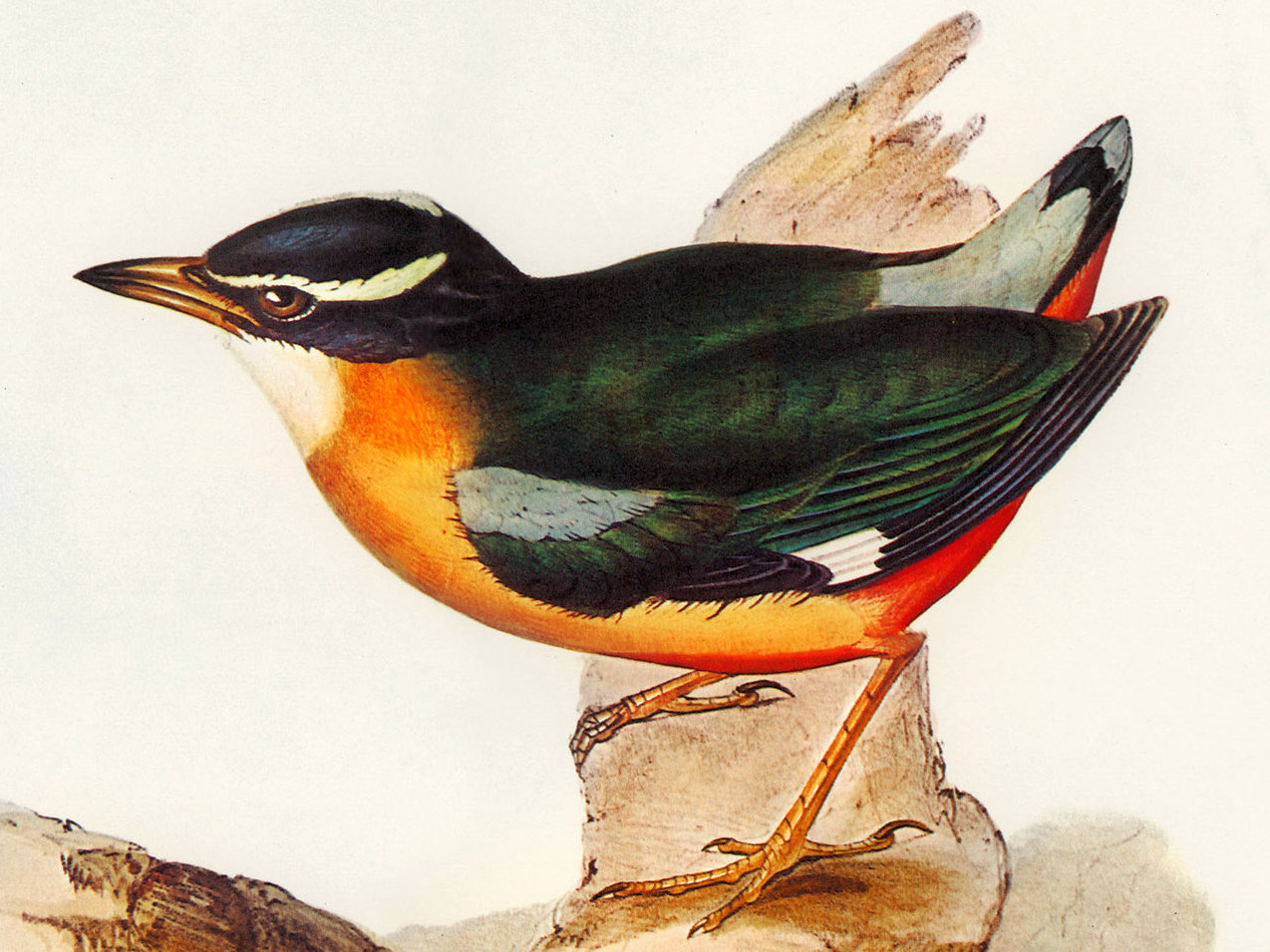

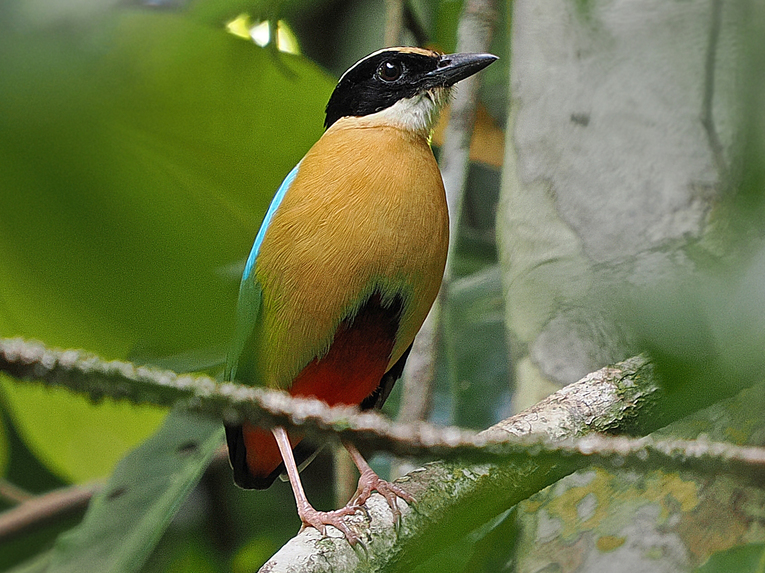

Scientific classification
- Kingdom: Animalia
- Phylum: Chordata
- Class: Aves
- Order: Passeriformes
- Family: Pittidae
- Genus: Pitta
- Species: P. vigorsii

Binomial name
- Pitta vigorsii Gould, 1838

= Banda Sea pitta =

Species of bird

The Banda Sea pitta or two-striped pitta (Pitta vigorsii) is a species of bird in the family Pittidae. It is found in Indonesia. Its natural habitat is subtropical or tropical moist lowland forest. It is threatened by habitat loss.

== Morphology ==
The Banda Sea Pitta has a white supercilium, a white wing patch, and a belly patch that fades from black in the upper portion to red in the lower portion.

The Banda Sea Pitta is distinguished from other nearby Pitta species by its completely white throat.

== Taxonomy and etymology ==
The Banda Sea Pitta was previously thought to be a subsepecies of the Elegant Pitta (Pitta elegans).

The common name refers to the Banda Sea surrounding the islands which the species inhabits.

Lambert suggests that the Banda Sea Pitta is descended from a migratory ancestral species which colonized multiple islands.

== Distribution ==
The Banded Sea pitta is endemic to the islands of the Lesser Sundaic archipelago in Wallacea, Indonesia; specifically evidence for its presence has been noted on the Kai Kecil islands, the mTanbar islands, Tepa, Romang, Sermata, and Nyata. P. virgosii lives in woodlands and seasonal monsoon forests.

== Behavior and ecology ==
The species produces both two-and three note element motifs, a unique feature among the local Pitta species. The pauses between elements are longer in P. vigorsii than in other Pitta species. The species may be seasonally vocal.

== Links ==
Recordings of P. vigorsii vocalizations
