= Layeni =

Layeni may refer to:

- the former name of Triantafyllia, Florina, a village in the Florina regional unit, northern Greece
- Layoni, Indonesia, a village in the Maluku Islands of Indonesia
- a Yoruba surname from Nigeria
  - Stefano Layeni, a football (soccer) player, play for Calcio Prato
