= Barat Daya Islands =

Island group in Maluku, Indonesia

Coordinates: 7.75°S 126.25°E

Native name: Kepulauan Barat Daya
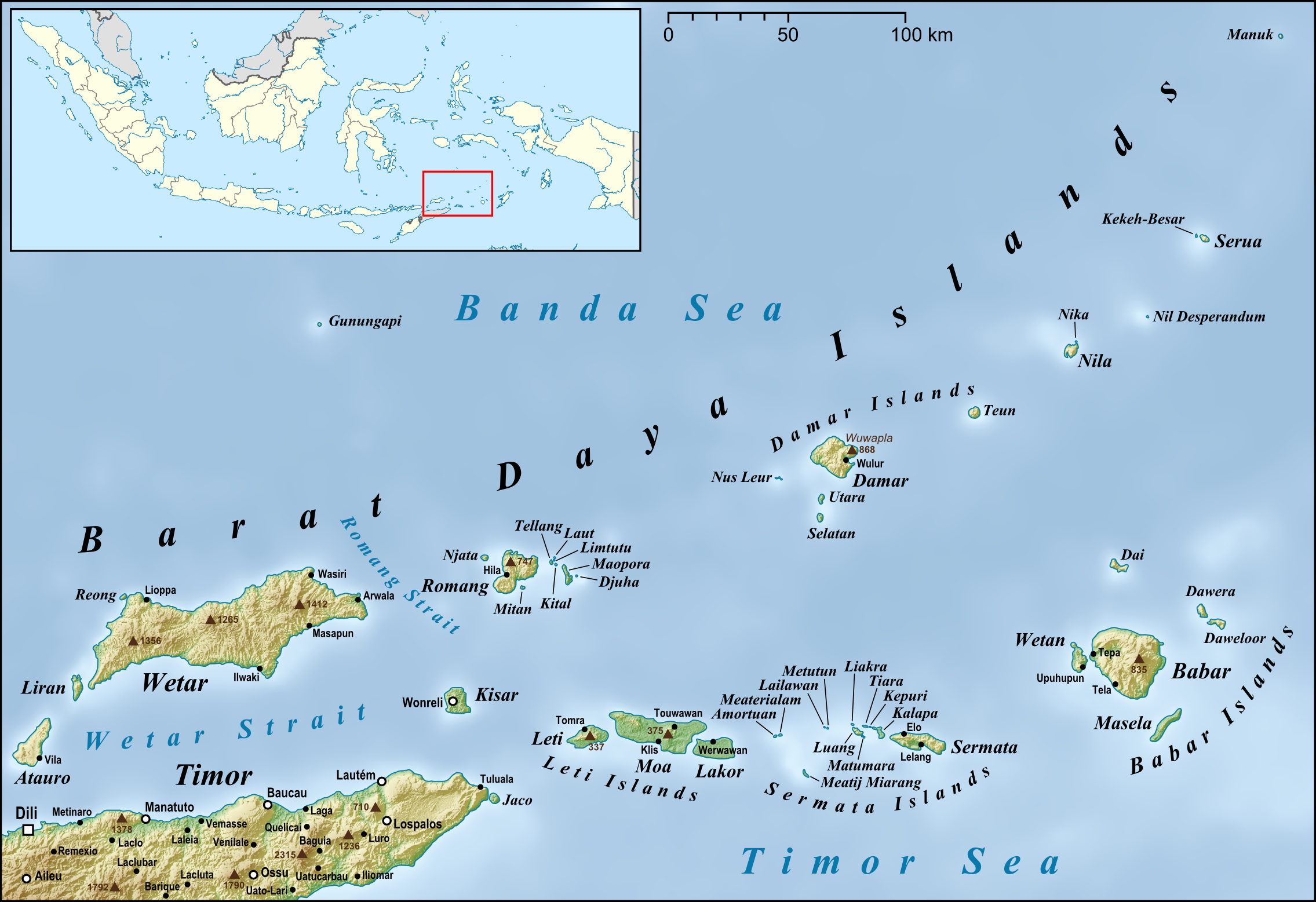

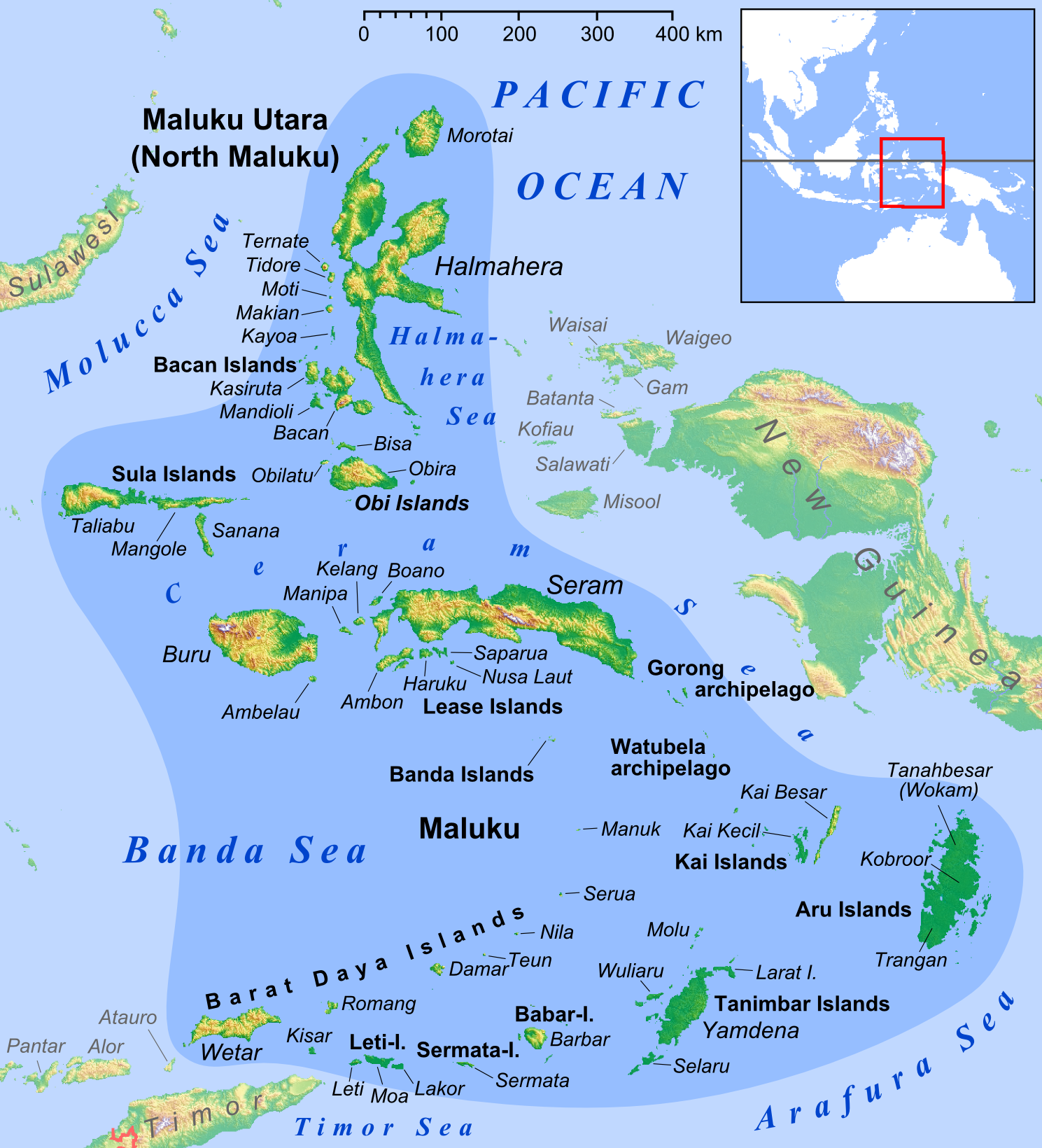
- Barat Daya Islands in the south of Maluku Islands

Geography
- Location: Southeast Asia
- Archipelago: Maluku Islands
- Major islands: Damar, Kisar, Liran, Romang, Wetar

Administration
- Indonesia
- Province: Maluku

Additional information
- Time zone: Indonesia Eastern Standard Time (UTC+09:00)

The Barat Daya Islands (Indonesian: Kepulauan Barat Daya; Indonesian pronunciation: [kəpuˌlawan ˌbarat̚ ˈdaja]) are a group of islands in the Maluku province of Indonesia, with an estimated 100,000 inhabitants in 2026. The Indonesian phrase barat daya means 'south-west'.

== Geography ==
These islands are located off the eastern end of East Timor. Wetar is the largest island in the group. To the west, the Ombai Strait separates Wetar from Alor Island, part of East Nusa Tenggara. The Wetar Strait separates Wetar from Timor to the south.

Even though included in the Indonesian Maluku province political division, the southwestern islands are geographically part of the Lesser Sunda Islands. Rainfall is limited with a dry season between October and December when some of the islands appear as dry savannah. The Barat Daya Islands except Wetar are part of the Banda Sea Islands moist deciduous forests ecoregion. Wetar and Timor comprise the Timor and Wetar deciduous forests ecoregion. Most of the islands are barren, infertile and minimally forested.

Together with Timor, Nusa Tenggara, Sulawesi, and most of Maluku, the Barat Daya Islands are part of Wallacea, the group of Indonesian islands that are separated by deep water from both the Australian and Asian continental shelves. The islands of Wallacea have never been linked by land to either Asia or Australia, and as a result have few mammals and a mix of flora and fauna from both continents.

=== Islands ===
Among the islands within the archipelago are (from west to east):

- Liran
- Wetar
- Kisar
- Nyata
- Romang
- Leti Islands (Leti, Moa, Lakor)
- Sermata Islands
- Damer
- Babar Islands

=== Populated places ===
- Layoni (Teun Island)

== Geology ==
The islands are part of the Inner Banda Arc, a volcanic island arc created by the collision of the Indo-Australian Plate and the Eurasian Plate. Romang and Damar are volcanic; Wetar consists mostly of oceanic crust that was pushed to the surface by the colliding plates. The Barat Daya and Banda islands constitute an inner arc; the outer arc, which includes Timor, the Tanimbar Islands, and the Kai Islands, is mostly made up of oceanic crust lifted up by the collision, and wraps around south and east of the inner arc.

== History ==
Unlike much of the rest of the Maluku Islands, the Barat Daya Islands did not participate in the inter-island trade over the centuries. Damar was the region's only island to have produced spice. Too remote from the centre of the Malukan spice trade, the Dutch destroyed the nutmeg trees on Babar. Bugis and Makarassarese annually sailed to coral-rich Luang to purchase reef products such as trepang and mother of pearl.

== Administration ==
The Maluku Barat Daya Regency is administratively composed of seventeen districts (kecamatan), whose areas (in km^{2}) and 2013 officially estimated populations are listed below.: The districts are formally grouped into three archipelagoes – the Terselatan Group (including Wetar, as well as Kisar and Romang Islands), the Lemola Group (Letti, Moa and Lakor) and the Babar Group (including the Damer and Sermata Islands). The areas (in km^{2}) and the populations at the 2010 census and 2020 census, together with the official estimates as at mid 2025, are listed below. The table also includes the locations of the district administrative centres, the number of administrative villages in each district (totaling 117 rural desa and 1 urban kelurahan – the latter being Tiakur on Moa Island), and its post code.

Kode Wilayah	Name of district (kecamatan)	comprising	Area in km^{2}	Pop'n census 2010	Pop'n census 2020	Pop'n estimate mid 2025	Admin centre	No. of Villages	Post Code
81.08.06	Wetar Selatan	southern part of Wetar Island	1,157.60	7,916	2,359	2,941	Ilwaki	6	97446
81.08.14	Wetar Barat	western part of Wetar Island, plus Lirang Island, and other islands west of Wetar	345.70	^{(a)}	2,181	2,884	Ustutun	5	97447
81.08.13	Wetar Utara	northern part of Wetar Island, plus Reong Island	677.60	^{(a)}	2,365	3,571	Lurang	6	97449
81.08.15	Wetar Timur	eastern part of Wetar Island	470.90	^{(a)}	1,717	2,272	Arwala	6	97448
81.08.07	Kisar Selatan	southern part of Kisar Island	65.40	17,899	10,027	11,022	Wonreli	6	97445
81.08.17	Kisar Utara	northern part of Kisar Island	18.59	^{(b)}	3,185	3,368	Putihair Timur	3	97441
81.08.16	Kepulauan Roma	Romang Islands	194.30	^{(b)}	4,146	4,692	Rumkuda	3	97440
	Totals for Terselatan Group		2,930.09	25,815	25,980	32,867		35	
81.08.08	Letti	Leti Island	90.10	7,526	8,060	9,370	Serwaru	7	97444
81.08.01	Moa	Moa Island	361.60	9,138	16,294	20,606	Weet	8	97442
81.08.12	Lakor	Lakor Island	112.60	^{(c)}	2,516	2,891	Wewawan	5	97443
	Totals for Lemola Group		564.30	16,664	26,870	30,837		20	
81.08.02	Damer	Damer Island, plus uninhabited Nus Leur, Terbang Utara and Terbang Selatan	201.80	5,560	5,718	6,565	Wulur	7	97652^{(d)}
81.08.03	Kepulauan Luang Sermata	Sermata Islands	125.50	5,269	5,116	6,741	Lelang	11	97652
81.08.04	Babar Barat	Babar Island (western half), Dai	359.70	7,752	6,491	7,413	Tepa	9	97451
81.08.05	Babar Timur	Babar Island (eastern half)	281.30	9,654	6,012	6,996	Letwurung	11	97654
81.08.09	Pulau Masela	Masela Island	46.71	^{(e)}	2,322	2,729	Latalola Besar	11	97653
81.08.10	Dawelor Dawera	Dawelor Island and Dawera Island	27.06	^{(e)}	1,294	1,516	Watuwey	6	97651
81.08.11	Pulau Wetang	Wetang Island	44.60	^{(f)}	2,125	2,490	Rumah Lewang Besar	8	97652
	Totals for Babar Group		1,086.679	28,235	29,078	34,450		63	

Notes:
(a) the 2010 populations for the four districts which comprised Pulau Pulau Wetar District are listed under Wetar Selatan District.
(b) the 2010 populations of Kisar Utara and Kepulauan Roma Districts are included under the figure for Kisar Selatan District (formerly called Pulau Pulau Terselatan District), from which they were split off.
(c) the 2010 population of Lakor District is included in the figure for Moa District, from which it was split off.
(d) except for Batumerah desa in the west of the island, which has a postcode of 97128.
(e) the 2010 populations of Pulau Masela and Daweloor Dawera Districts are included under the figure for Babar Timur District, from which they were split off.
(f) the 2010 population of Pulau Wetang District is included in the figure for Babar Barat District (formerly called Pulau Pulau Babar District), from which it was split off.

== See also ==
- List of islands of Indonesia
- Maluku Islands
- Maluku (province)
