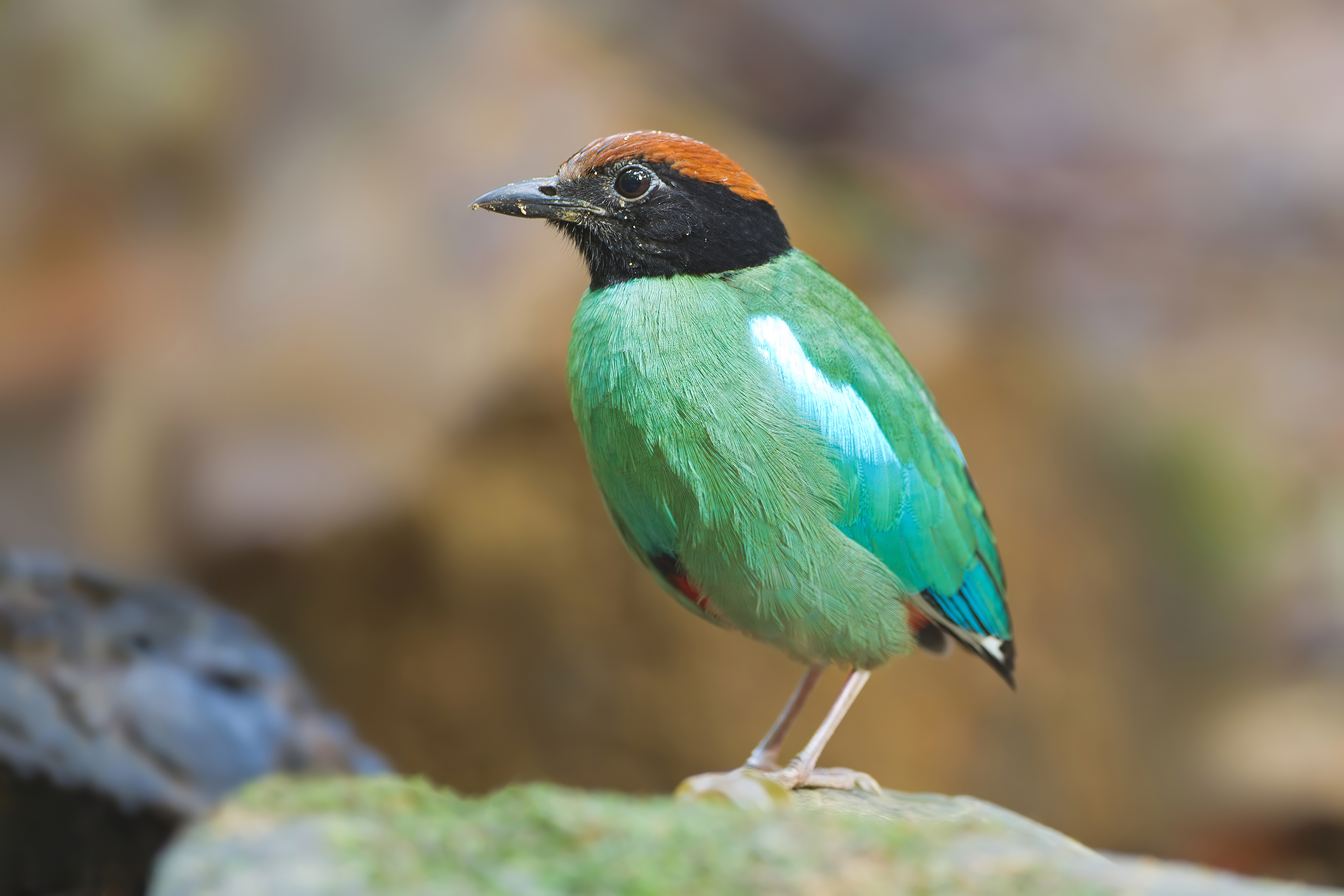
- P. s. cucullata Si Phang-nga National Park, Thailand

Conservation status
- Least Concern (IUCN 3.1)

Scientific classification
- Kingdom: Animalia
- Phylum: Chordata
- Class: Aves
- Order: Passeriformes
- Family: Pittidae
- Genus: Pitta
- Species: P. sordida

Binomial name
- Pitta sordida (Müller, PLS, 1776)

= Western hooded pitta =

Species of bird

The western hooded pitta (Pitta sordida) is a passerine bird in the family Pittidae. It is common in eastern and southeastern Asia and maritime Southeast Asia, where it lives in several types of forests as well as on plantations and other cultivated areas. It is a green bird with a black head and chestnut crown. It forages on the ground for insects and their larvae, and also eats berries. It breeds between February and August, the pair being strongly territorial and building their nest on the ground. Incubation and care of the fledglings is done by both parents. The bird has a wide range, and the International Union for Conservation of Nature has assessed its conservation status as being of "least concern". It was formerly considered to be conspecific with the Nicobar hooded pitta, the Minahasa hooded pitta, the eastern hooded pitta and the Biak hooded pitta.

== Taxonomy ==
The western hooded pitta was described by the German zoologist Philipp Statius Müller in 1776 and given the binomial name Turdus sordidus. Statius Müller's description was based on a plate showing the "Merle des Philippines" published by Comte de Buffon in his Planches Enluminées D'Histoire Naturelle. The species is now placed in the genus Pitta that was erected by the French ornithologist Louis Pierre Vieillot in 1816. The specific epithet sordida is Latin for "shabby" or "dirty".

Six subspecies are recognised:

- P. s. cucullata Hartlaub, 1843 – north India to south China and Indochina
- P. s. mulleri (Bonaparte, 1850) – Malay Peninsula, Sumatra, Java, Borneo and southwest Sulu Archipelago (south Philippines)
- P. s. bangkana Schlegel, 1863 – Bangka and Belitung (east of south Sumatra)
- P. s. sordida (Müller, PLS, 1776) – Philippines (except Palawan group)
- P. s. palawanensis Parkes, 1960 – Palawan group (southwest Philippines)
- P. s. sanghirana Schlegel, 1866 – Sangihe Islands (northeast of Sulawesi)

== Behaviour ==
Western hooded pittas can reach a length of 16 to 19 cm (6.3 to 7.5 in) and a weight of 42 to 70 g (1.5 to 2.5 oz). It has a black head, chestnut crown and green body and wings. Its diet consists of various insects (including their larvae), which they hunt on the ground, and berries. In the breeding period, which lasts from February to August, they build nests on the ground; both parent take care of the eggs and the fledglings. They are highly territorial and their fluty double-noted whistle calls ("qweeek-qweeek") can be constantly heard from their territories, sometimes throughout the nights.

The International Union for Conservation of Nature is concerned in particular about the ongoing loss of habitat that this bird suffers, which is reducing its numbers, but has rated it as being a "least concern species" because the rate of population decline is insufficient to warrant a threatened category.

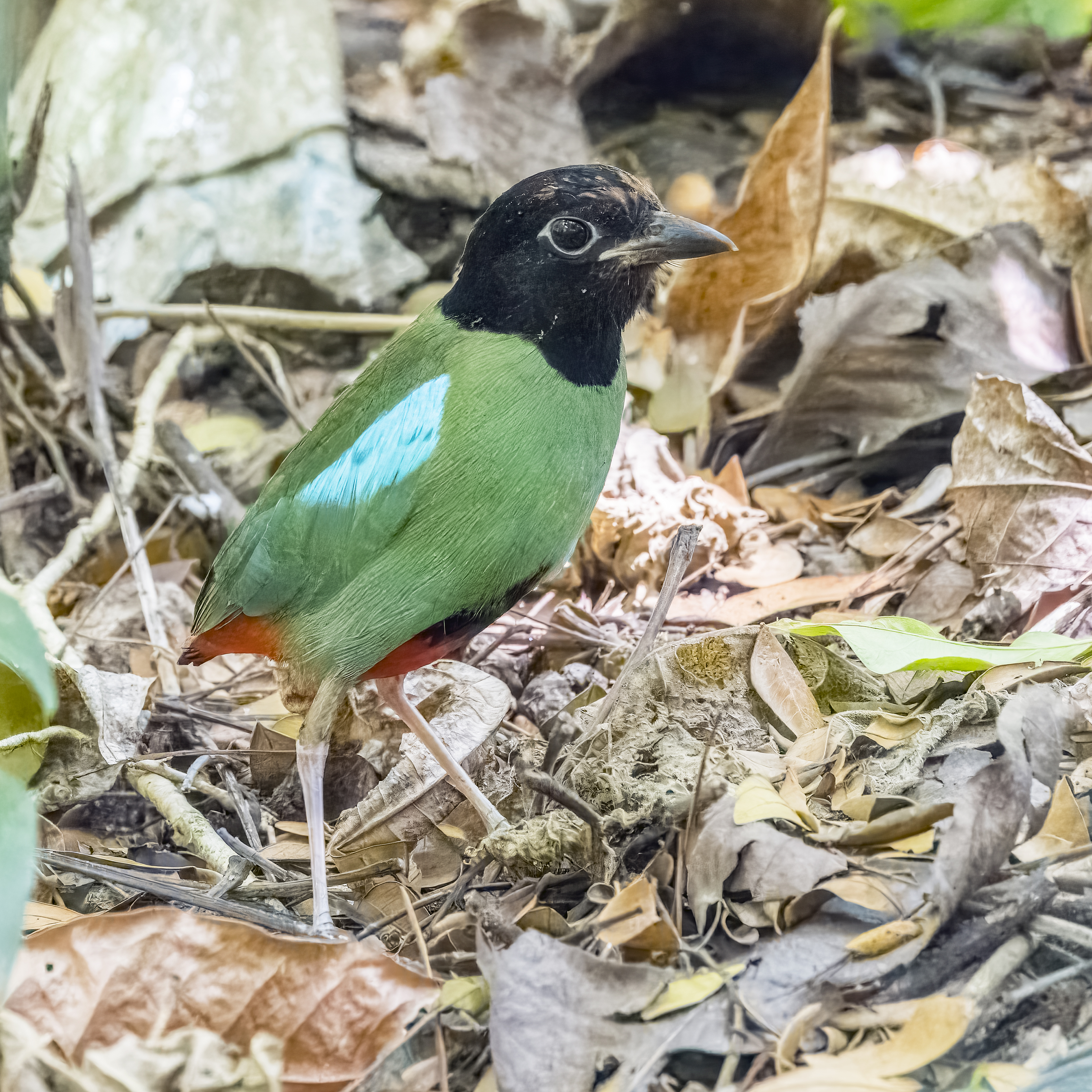
P. s. sordida, Luzon, Philippines

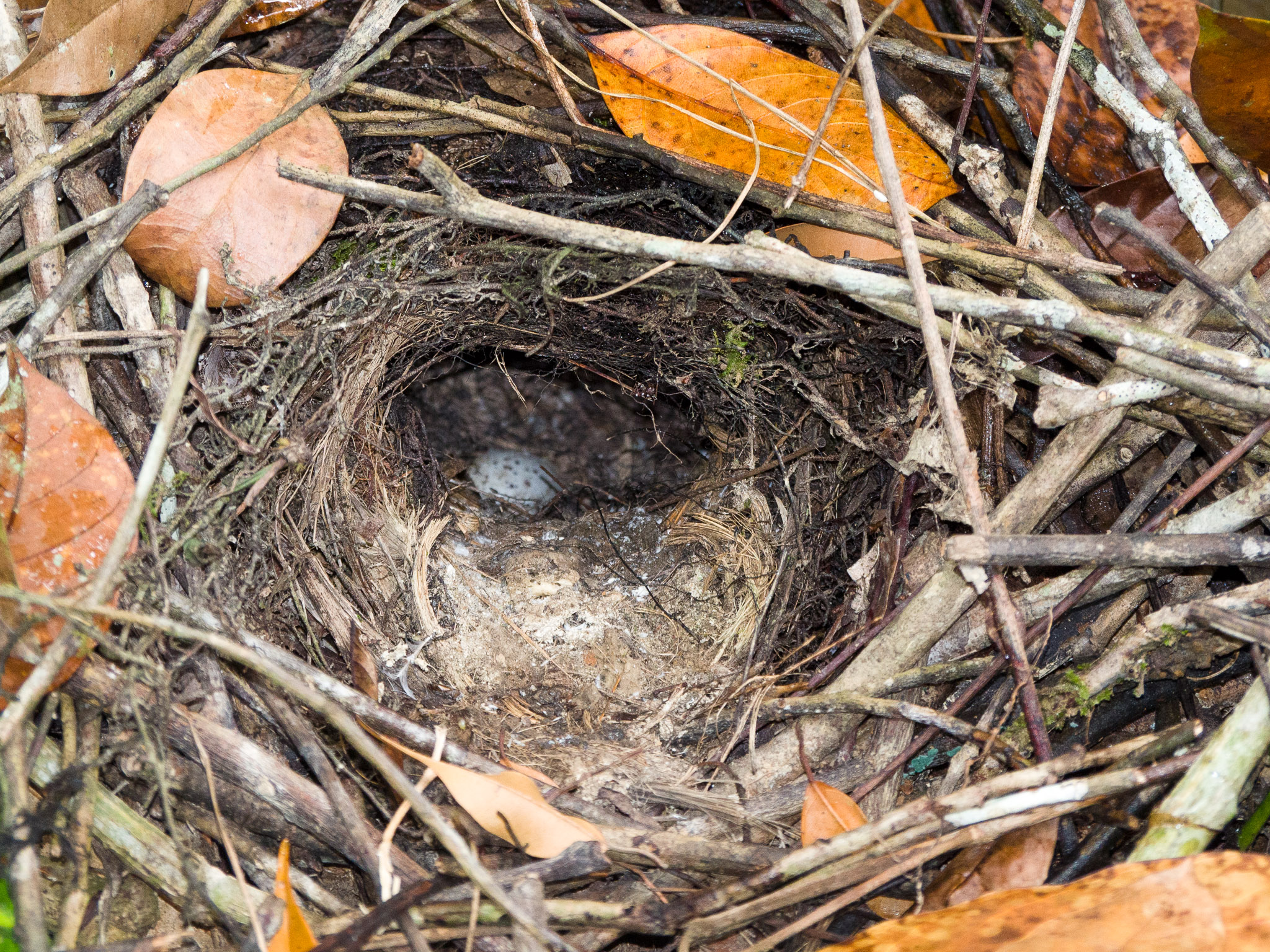
Nest with egg in Borneo

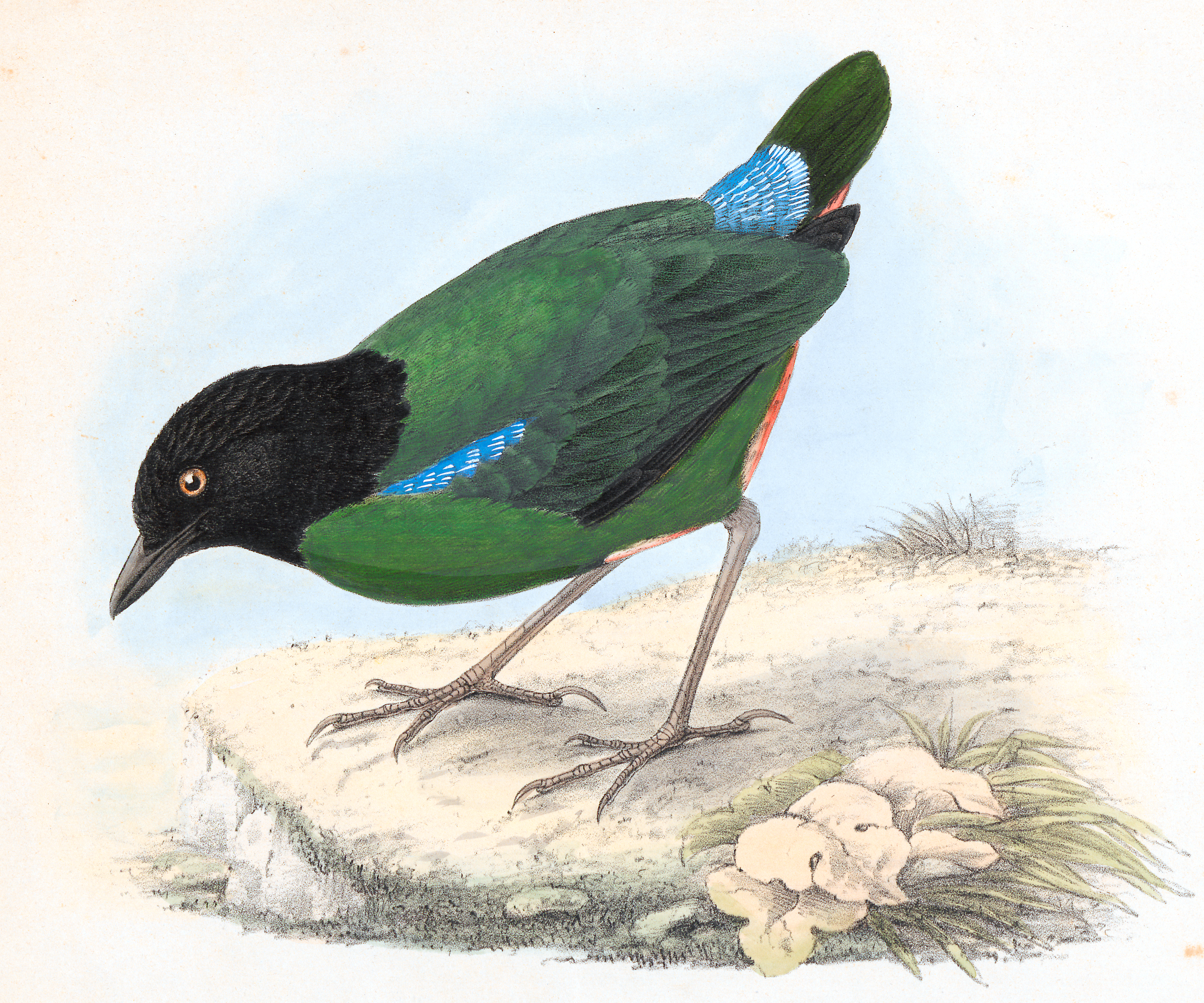
P. s. forsteni (Bonaparte, 1850), native to the Minahassa Peninsula
