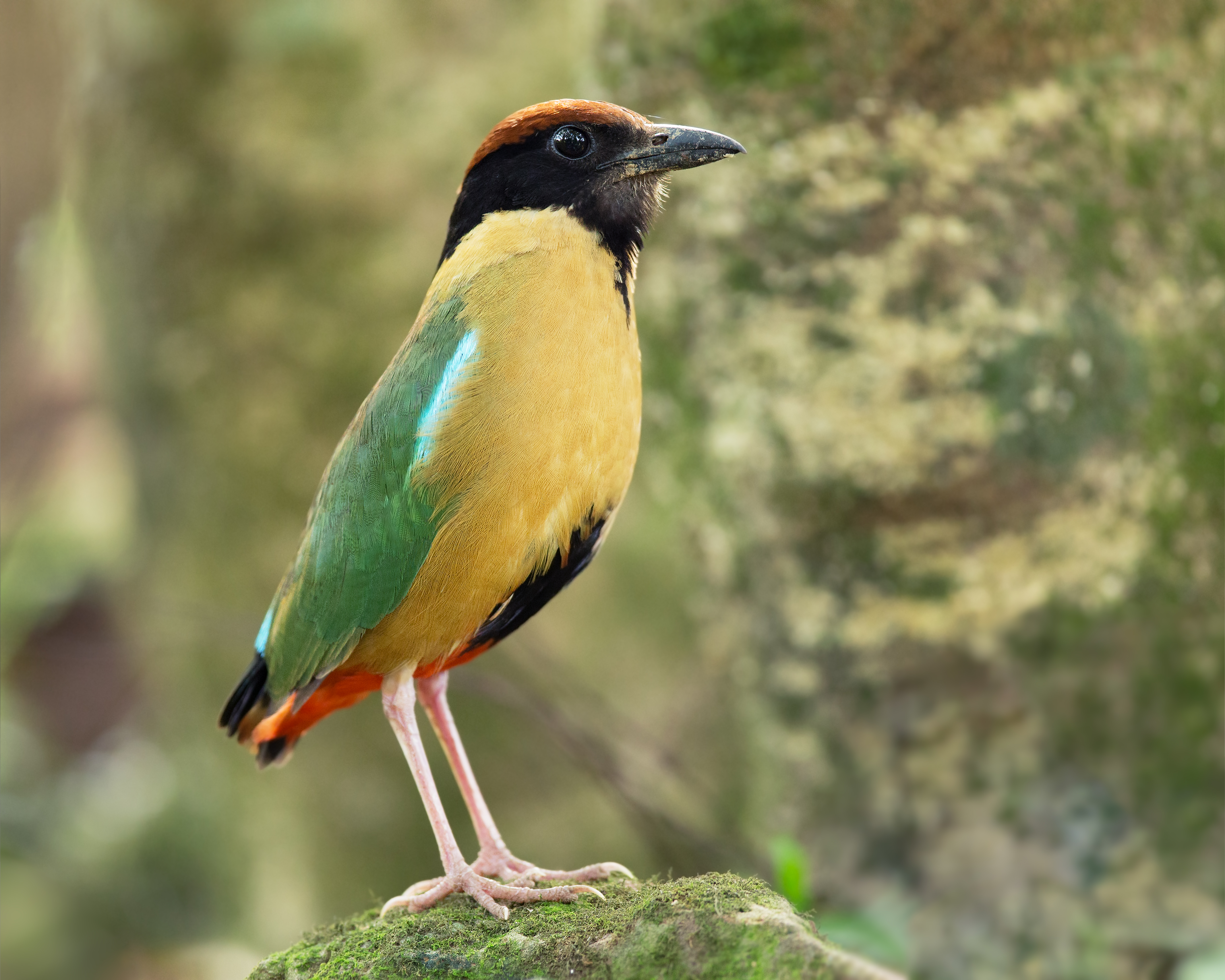
- In Kembla Heights, New South Wales

Conservation status
- Least Concern (IUCN 3.1)

Scientific classification
- Kingdom: Animalia
- Phylum: Chordata
- Class: Aves
- Order: Passeriformes
- Family: Pittidae
- Genus: Pitta
- Species: P. versicolor

Binomial name
- Pitta versicolor Swainson, 1825
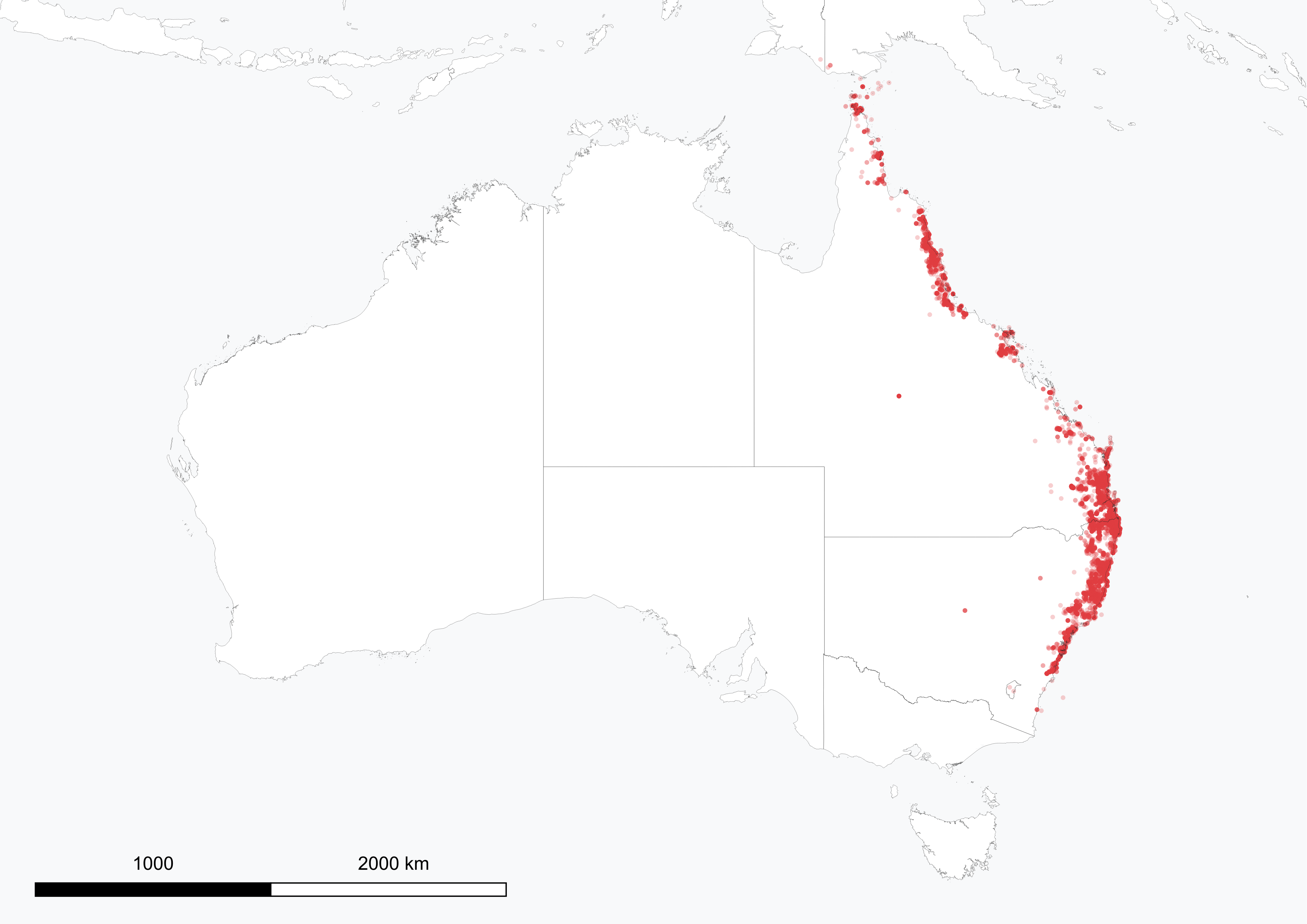
- Species distribution

Synonyms
- Pitta strepitans

= Noisy pitta =

Species of bird

The noisy pitta (Pitta versicolor) is a species of bird in the family Pittidae. The noisy pitta is found in eastern Australia and southern New Guinea. It eats earthworms, insects and snails. Its natural habitats are temperate forests, subtropical or tropical moist lowland forest, and subtropical or tropical moist montane forest.

== Taxonomy ==
Some authorities believe that the noisy pitta is conspecific with the elegant pitta (Pitta elegans) of Indonesia, and/or with the rainbow pitta (Pitta iris) from the Northern Territory, but it is usually regarded as forming a superspecies with these two species and with the black-faced pitta (Pitta anerythra) of the Solomon Islands. Not all authorities agree that all these species are related; Erritzoe and Erritzoe (1998) dispute the inclusion of the rainbow pitta in this superspecies.

There are two subspecies with a demarcation line around Cairns. Pitta versicolor simillima occurs in northern Queensland and the islands of the Torres Strait. The members of this subspecies migrate to the southern part of Papua New Guinea. The nominate race P. v. versicolor is found in the rest of Queensland and southward to the Hunter River in New South Wales. On 27 October 2017 a bird was observed in Strickland State Forest at Sommersby on the Central Coast. A third subspecies, P. v. intermedia, has sometimes been recognised, based on size differences, but this is now thought to represent a clinal difference based on latitude and is no longer accepted.

William Swainson described the noisy pitta in 1825 based on a specimen collected in New South Wales. The specific name, versicolor is Latin for multicoloured. John Gould described the subspecies Pitta versicolor simillima in 1868. The subspecific name is Latin for similar.

The noisy pitta is also known as the buff-breasted pitta, the lesser pitta, and the blue-winged pitta (Pitta moluccensis is another species known as the blue-winged pitta, which sometimes leads to confusion in applying their common names). It was also known colloquially as the anvil-bird (after its feeding behaviour), the bobtail and the painted thrush.

== Description ==
The noisy pitta is 19 to 21 cm (7.5–8.3 in) long. Males weigh 70–112 g (2.5–4.0 oz) and females 70–128 g (2.5–4.5 oz). It is a colourful bird. It has a black head and nape of neck with a chestnut crown. The wings are green with a turquoise front edge and the back is also green. The throat, breast and belly are lemon yellow. The tail is black and the under-tail coverts are orange-red.

Juvenile birds resembled adults but are duller, with olive green on the wings and the buffy breast washed with grey, as is the throat and chin. The chestnut feathers of the crown are tipped with black and the lesser wing coverts lack any blue.

== Distribution and habitat ==
The noisy pitta is found in forest habitats along the east coast of Australia. Its breeding range extends from the Torres Strait Islands and the northern tip of Cape York Peninsula southwards to the New South Wales/Victoria border. It occurs mainly in rainforest but is also sometimes found in drier woodland and scrub. Outside of Australia they may be found in southern New Guinea, where they are probably underreported and winter migrants. It has also been suggested that they breed in southern New Guinea.

== Behaviour ==
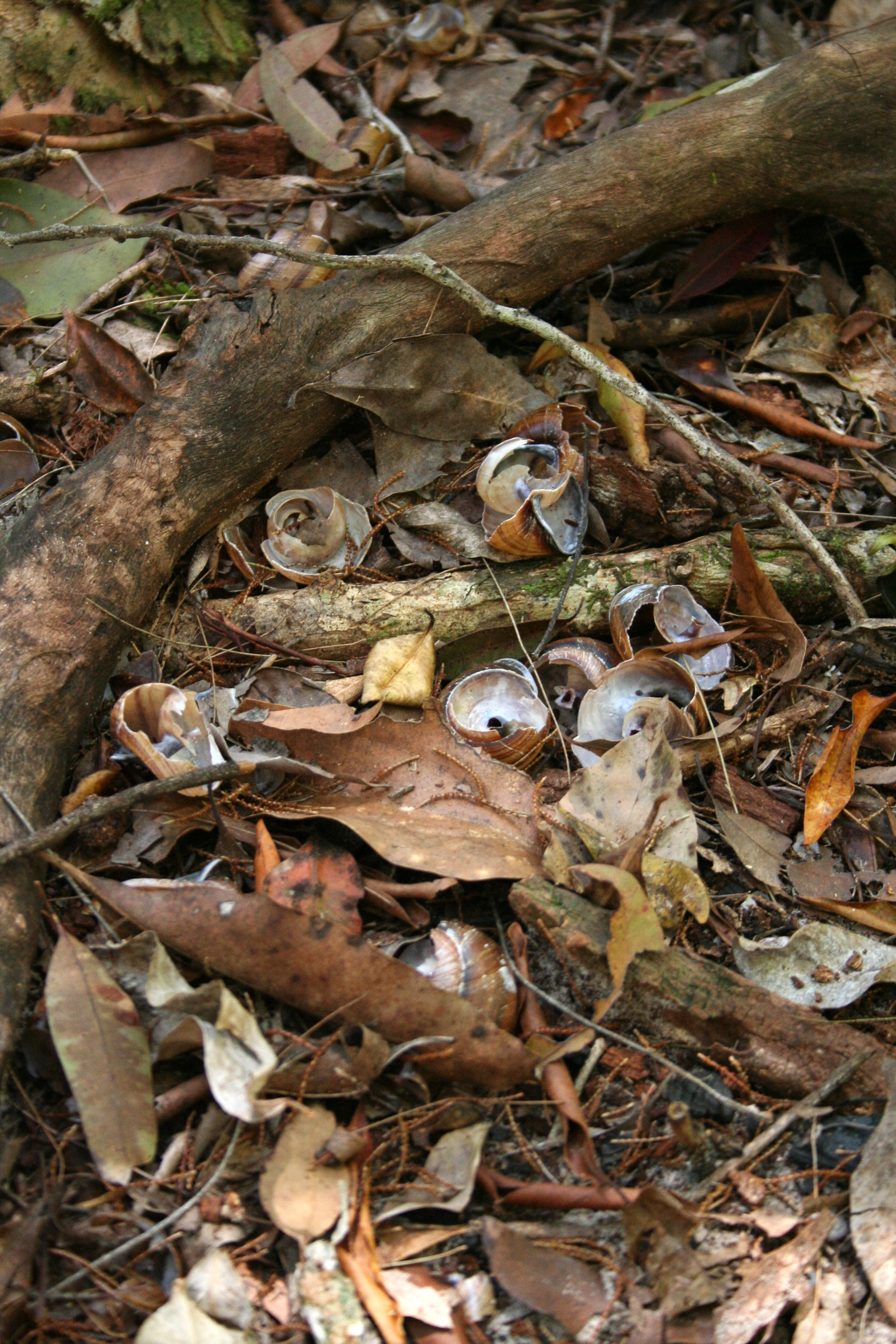
Pitta feeding "anvil" with broken land snail shells

The noisy pitta is a shy bird and its distinctive call is heard more often than the bird is seen. Because of this it has been suggested that the species is often overlooked when not calling.

=== Calls ===
Noisy pittas call most frequently in the morning with a secondary peak in calling around midday. Calling declines in the afternoon before spiking again at dusk. They also call at night. Seasonally, they call most frequently in the breeding season, with almost no calling between March and August.

The call is usually repeated twice and consists of a sequence of three ascending notes, sometimes rendered as "walk-to-work".

=== Diet and feeding ===
The noisy pitta is a bird of the forest floor where it rummages through the leaf litter for the insects, woodlice, snails and other invertebrates on which it feeds. It bobs its head up and down and flicks its tail from side to side while it forages. Its diet includes some fruit and it cracks open the shells of molluscs such as the giant panda snail (Hedleyella falconeri) on an anvil, a stone or other hard surface habitually used for this purpose. Small lizards are also caught and bashed against hard surfaces before swallowing.

=== Breeding ===
Like other pittas this species nests in a concealed location on the ground. The breeding season peaks in late spring and early summer, although the timing varies by location. In the southern part of its range (northern New South Wales and southern Queensland) eggs are laid between July and February with a peak in November, whereas around Cape York the season is more tightly from November to February with a peak in January. In the Torres Strait Islands the breeding season is January to April. These differences may be as the result of differences in rainfall across the range of this species, as the season is usually two months before the peak of rainfall. Typically the earlier breeding records of southern birds fall in years with higher than average rainfall. Timing the breeding in this way ensures that the maximum amount of food is available for fledglings when they become independent, and may also help ground nesting birds avoid losing clutches to flooding.

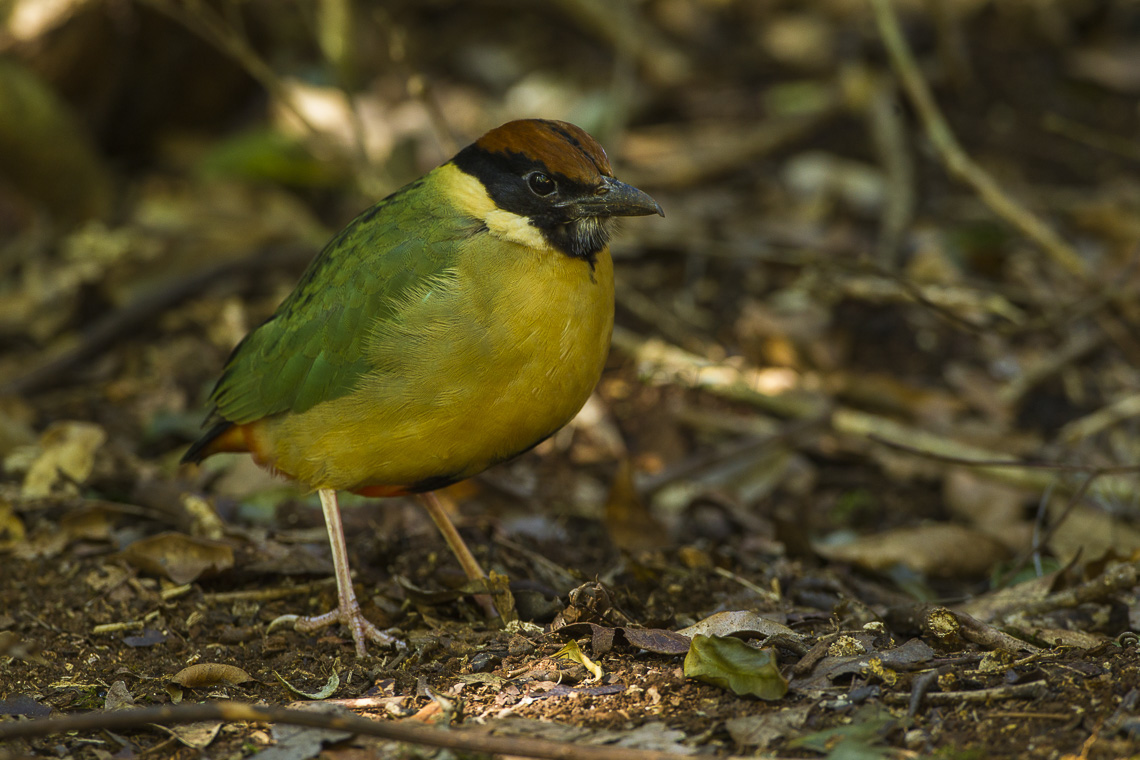
Noisy pittas in southern Queensland have larger clutch sizes than birds further north

The nest is domed and measures 30 by 30 by 20 cm (11.8 by 11.8 by 7.9 in). The nest is usually placed on the ground at the bottom of a large rock, stump of roots, but has also been reported being placed in a tree up to 2.7 m (8.9 ft) off the ground. The nest is made from branches and twigs, roots, plant fibres, mosses, strips of bark and feathers. The inside is lined with grass and other fine plant material, and new lining material is often brought into the nest during changeovers during incubation. Nests sometimes have a ramp built to the entrance made of sticks, and animal dung is sometimes placed in the entranceway and inside the nest. Both parents make the nest, although it has been reported that in captivity only the males do so.

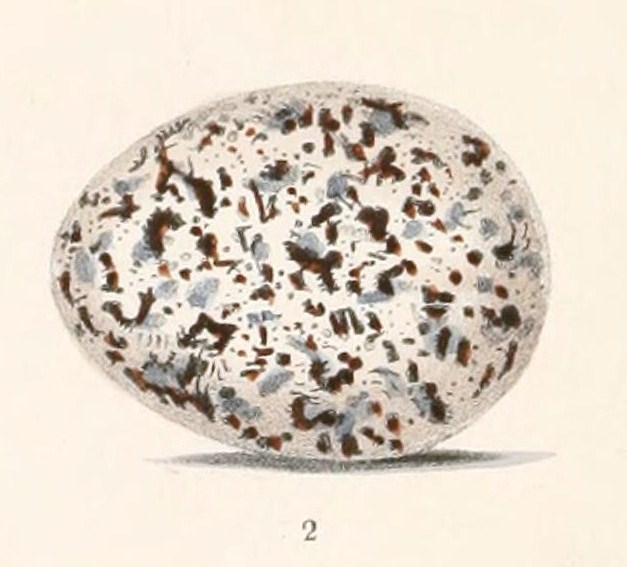
Egg of a noisy pitta

Clutch sizes can is typically between two and five eggs and this varies by latitude; with pairs in Cape York laying average clutch is around 3 eggs, whilst 4 eggs is more common in the southern part of their range. The eggs measure 32 mm × 25 mm (1.26 in × 0.98 in) on average, with eggs being larger further south. Later eggs in a clutch are smaller than eggs laid at the start. The eggs are white or blue-white and have purple-brown spots and underlying blotches of grey-blue.

Both parents incubate the eggs. In captivity the incubation period has been recorded as lasting 14 days. In the wild the incubation period lasts 17 days from the laying of the last egg. Both parents feed the chicks, although as the chicks get closer to fledging the male provided the most food. In captivity the young have been reported as being independent of their parents after 32 days.

== Status ==
The noisy pitta has a wide range and is believed to be fairly common in suitable habitats in Queensland. It is listed as being of "Least Concern" by BirdLife International in the Red List of Threatened Species. It may be diminishing slightly in number because of habitat destruction but probably not at a rate high enough to justify raising its status to "Near Threatened".
