= Romang (island) =

Island in Maluku, Indonesia

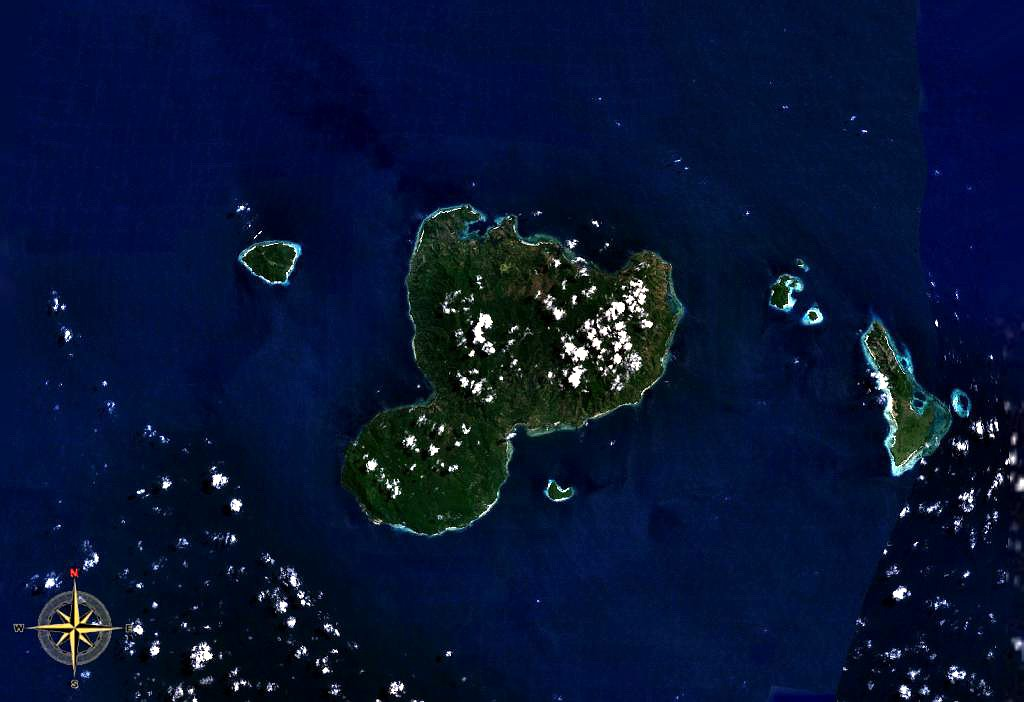
- Romang Island seen from space

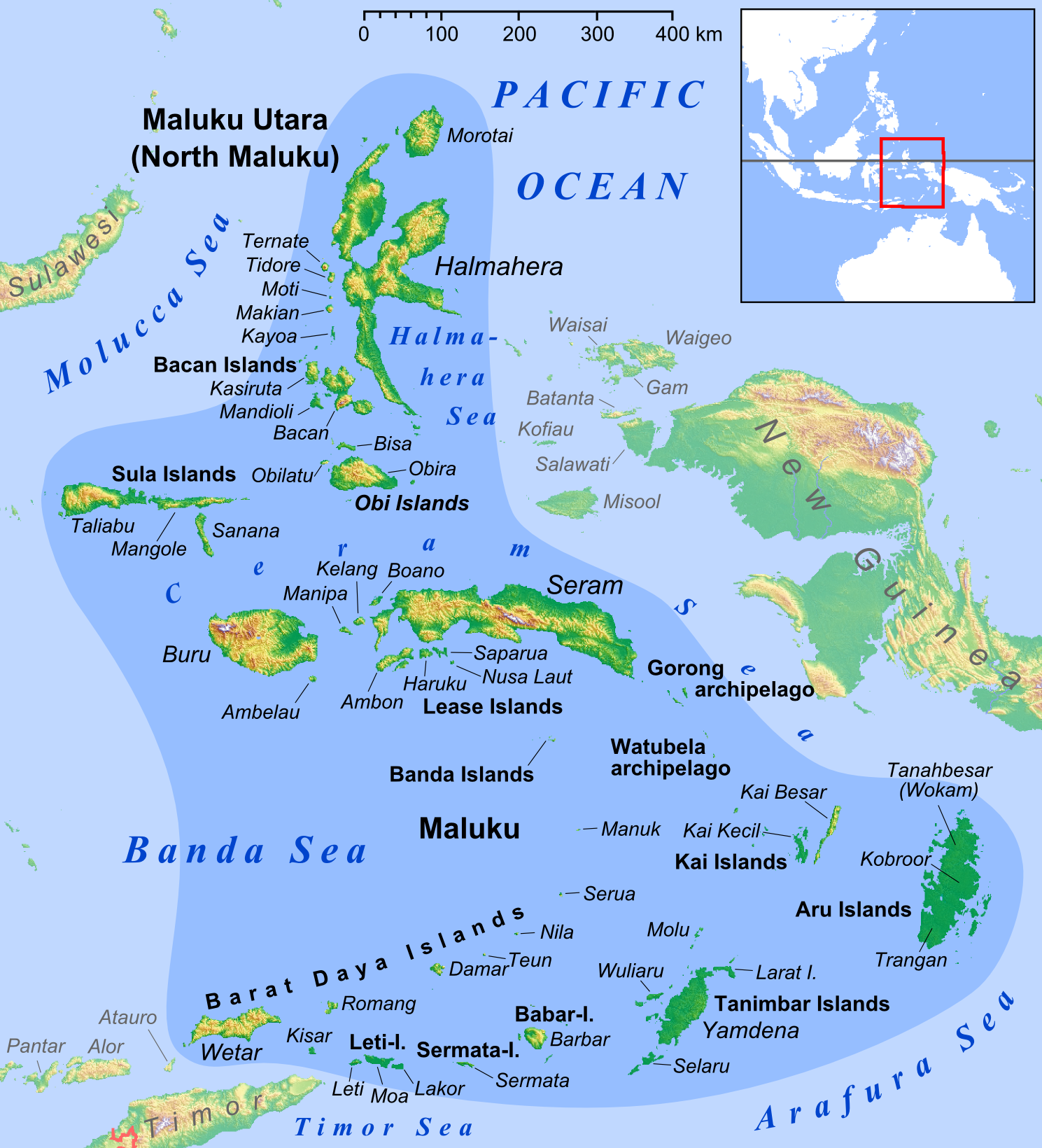
- Romang Island in the south of Maluku Islands

Geography
- Location: Southeast Asia
- Archipelago: Barat Daya Islands

Administration
- Indonesia
- Province: Maluku

Demographics
- Languages: Indonesian, Romang

Additional information
- Time zone: IEST (UTC+09:00)

Romang is an island, part of the Barat Daya Islands in Indonesia, located at 7.5833333°S 127.4333333°E, east of Wetar Island. Alternate names in use are Roma, Romonu and Fataluku. The group includes neighbouring smaller islands including Nyata to the west, Mitan to the south, and Maopora, Tellang, Laut, Limtutu and Djuha Islands to the east. Together they form the Kepulauan Roma District (formerly called the Terselatan Islands District or Kecamatan Pulau-Pulau Terselatan) within the Barat Daya Islands Regency of the Maluku Province. The district covers a land area of 191.33 km^{2} and had a population of 4,692 in mid 2025.
