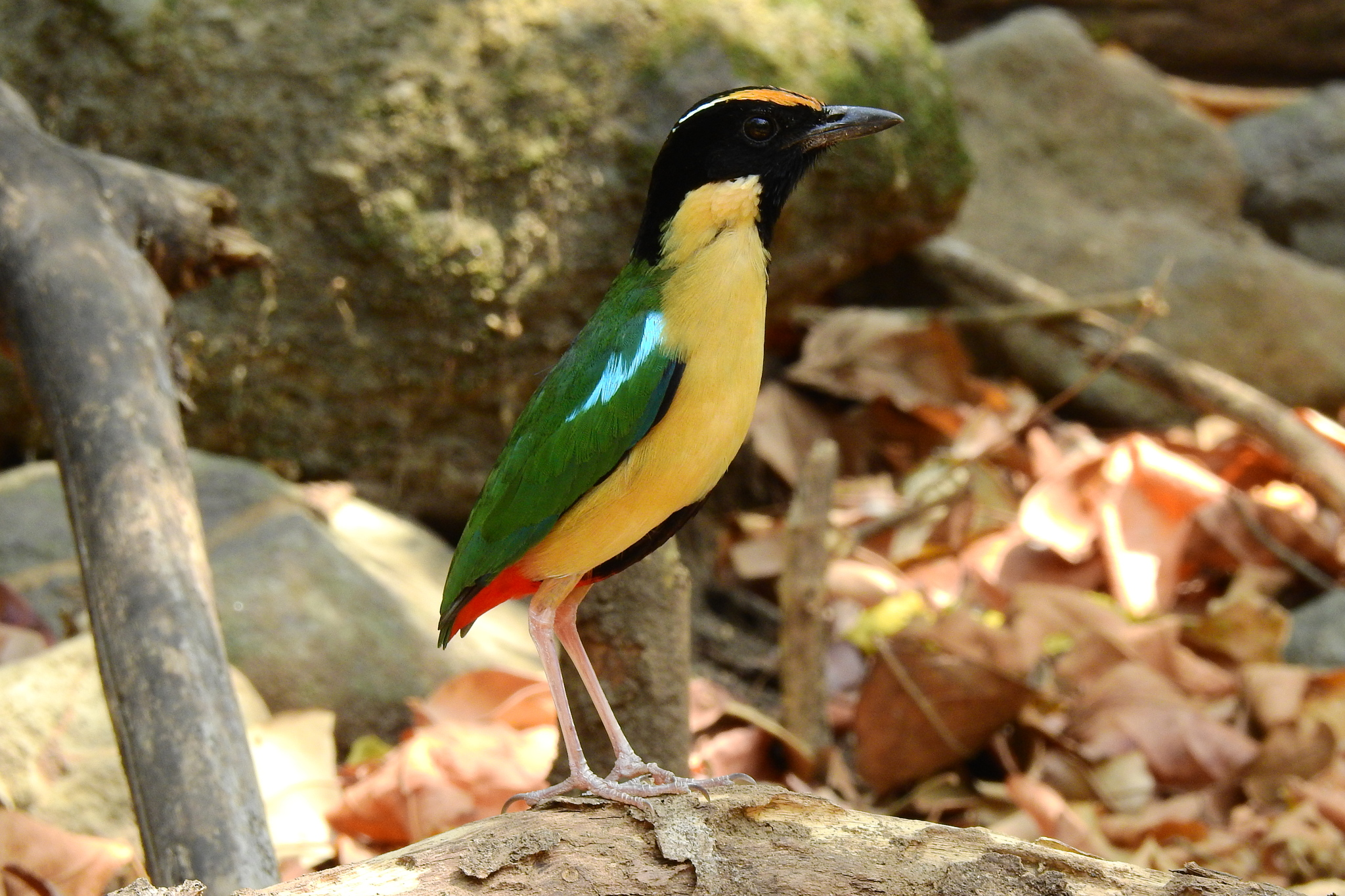

Scientific classification
- Kingdom: Animalia
- Phylum: Chordata
- Class: Aves
- Order: Passeriformes
- Family: Pittidae
- Genus: Pitta
- Species: P. concinna

Binomial name
- Pitta concinna Gould, 1857

= Ornate pitta =

Species of bird

The ornate pitta (Pitta concinna) is a species of bird in the family Pittidae. It is native to the Lesser Sunda Islands in Indonesia. Its natural habitat is subtropical or tropical moist lowland forest. It is threatened by habitat loss.
