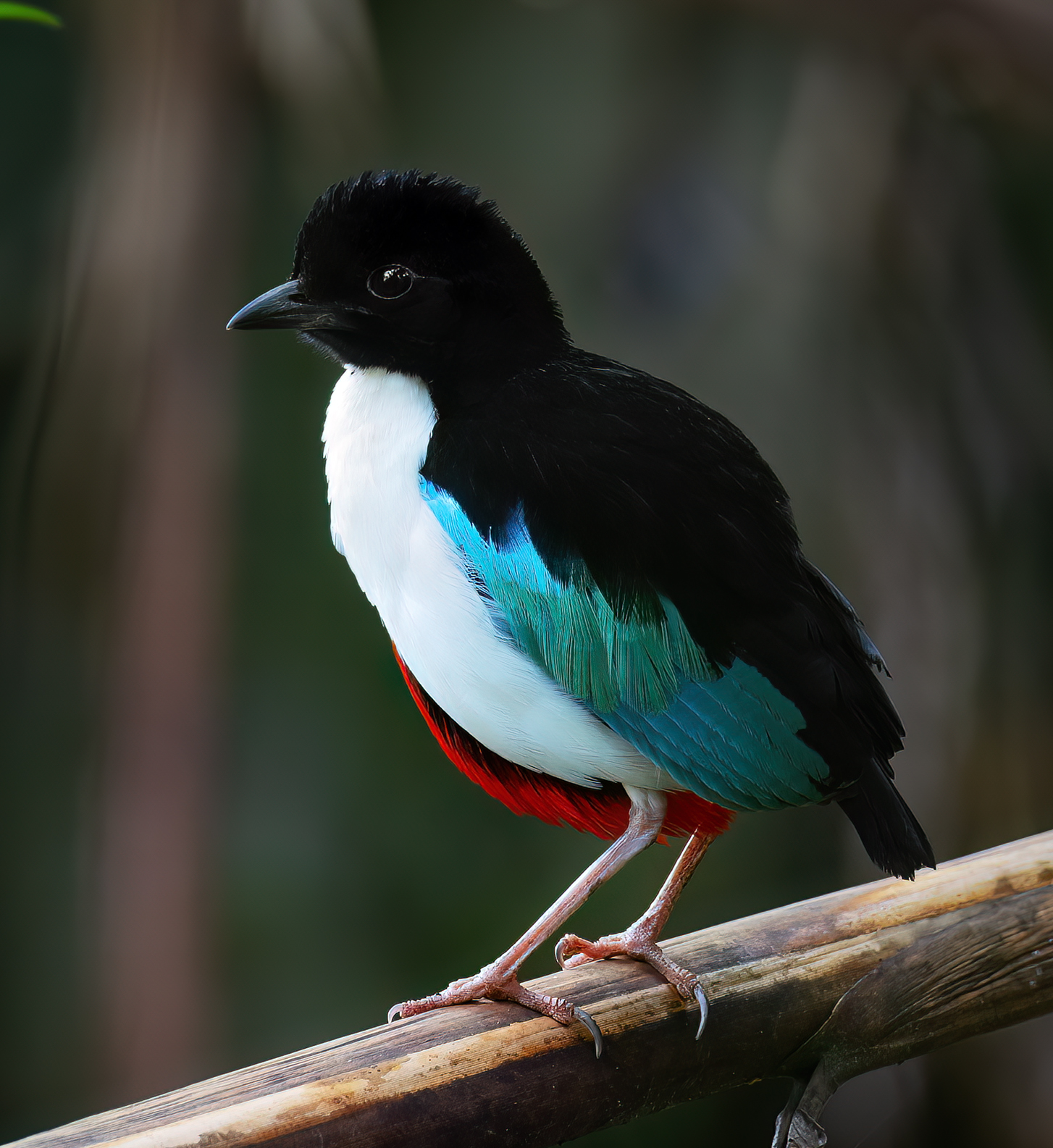

Conservation status
- Least Concern (IUCN 3.1)

Scientific classification
- Kingdom: Animalia
- Phylum: Chordata
- Class: Aves
- Order: Passeriformes
- Family: Pittidae
- Genus: Pitta
- Species: P. maxima

Binomial name
- Pitta maxima Müller & Schlegel, 1845

= Ivory-breasted pitta =

Species of bird

Ivory-breasted Pitta with worm

Ivory-breasted Pitta drinking

The ivory-breasted pitta (Pitta maxima) is a species of bird in the family Pittidae. It is endemic to North Maluku in Indonesia, known as Paok halmahera. Its natural habitat is subtropical or tropical moist lowland forests.

== Subspecies ==
Two subspecies are recognized:

- Pitta maxima maxima – : It is the nominate subspecies, found on the islands of Halmahera, Bacan, Kasiruta, Obi, and possibly Mandioli.
- Pitta maxima morotaiensis – : Found on the island of Morotai.
