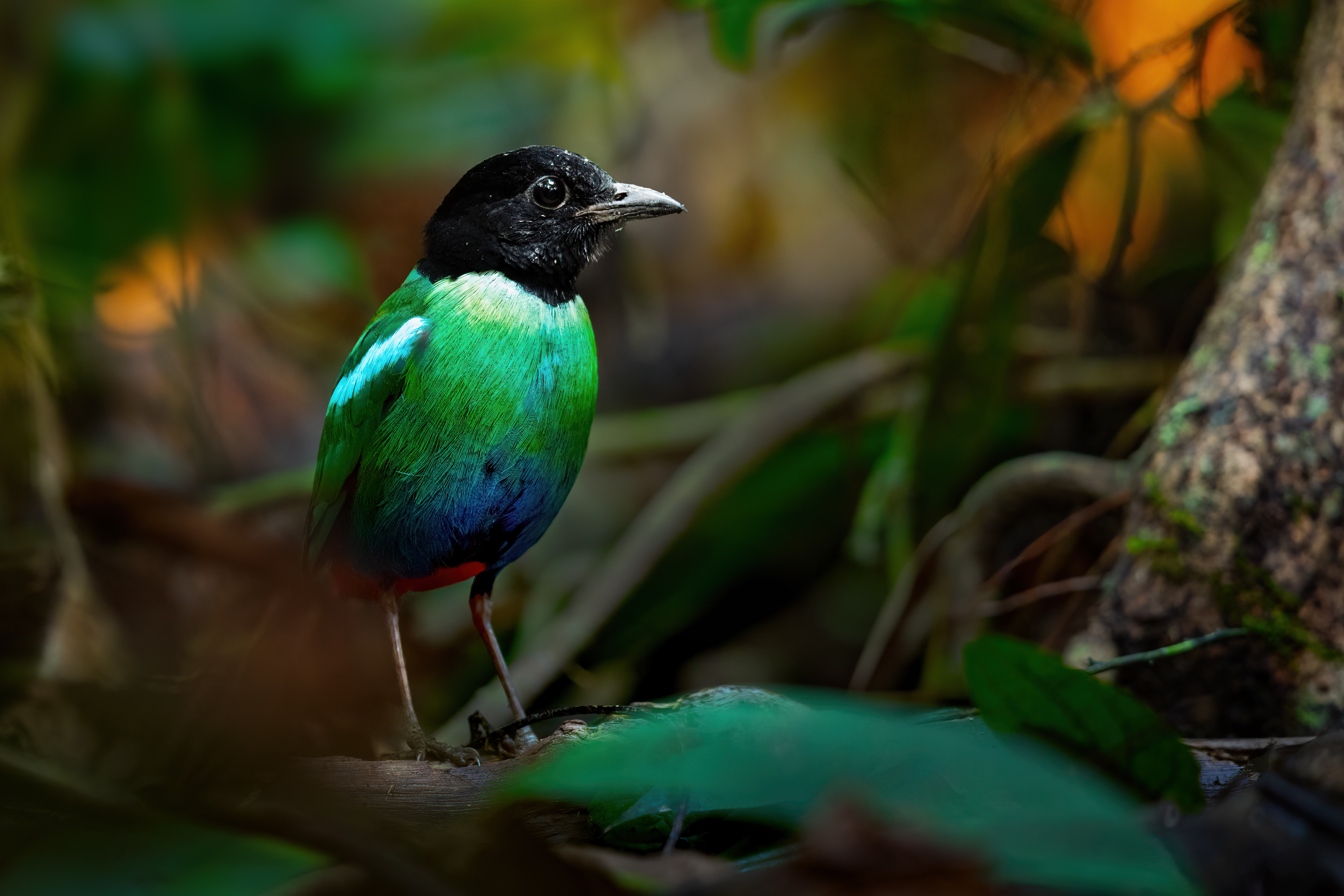

Conservation status
- Least Concern (IUCN 3.1)

Scientific classification
- Kingdom: Animalia
- Phylum: Chordata
- Class: Aves
- Order: Passeriformes
- Family: Pittidae
- Genus: Pitta
- Species: P. novaeguineae

Binomial name
- Pitta novaeguineae Müller, S & Schlegel, 1845

= Eastern hooded pitta =

Species of bird

The eastern hooded pitta (Pitta novaeguineae) is a passerine bird in the pitta family Pittidae that is endemic to New Guinea and some of the small neighbouring islands.

It is a green bird with a black head and chestnut crown. It forages on the ground for insects and their larvae, and also eats berries. It breeds between February and August, the pair being strongly territorial and building their nest on the ground. Incubation and care of the fledglings is done by both parents. It was formerly considered to be a subspecies of the hooded pitta, now renamed to the western hooded pitta.

== Taxonomy ==
The eastern hooded pitta was formally described in 1845 by the German naturalists Salomon Müller and Hermann Schlegel under the binomial name Pitta novaeguineae. This was a replacement name for Pitta atricapilla Quoy and Gaimard, 1830, as the latter name was pre-occupied by Turdus atricapilla Forster, JR, 1781, a junior synonym of Turdus sordidus Müller, PLS, 1776. The eastern hooded pitta was formerly considered to be a subspecies of the hooded pitta (renamed to the western hooded pitta). It is now considered as a separate species based on the significant genetic, morphological and vocal differences.

Three subspecies are recognised:

- P. n. novaeguineae Müller, S & Schlegel, 1845 – Raja Ampat Islands (northwest of New Guinea), New Guinea, Karkar Island (off northeast New Guinea) and Crown to Tolokiwa (between New Guinea and New Britain, southeast Bismarck Archipelago)
- P. n. goodfellowi White, CMN, 1937 – Aru Islands (southwest of New Guinea)
- P. n. mefoorana Schlegel, 1874 – Numfor (Cenderawasih Bay islands, northwest New Guinea)
