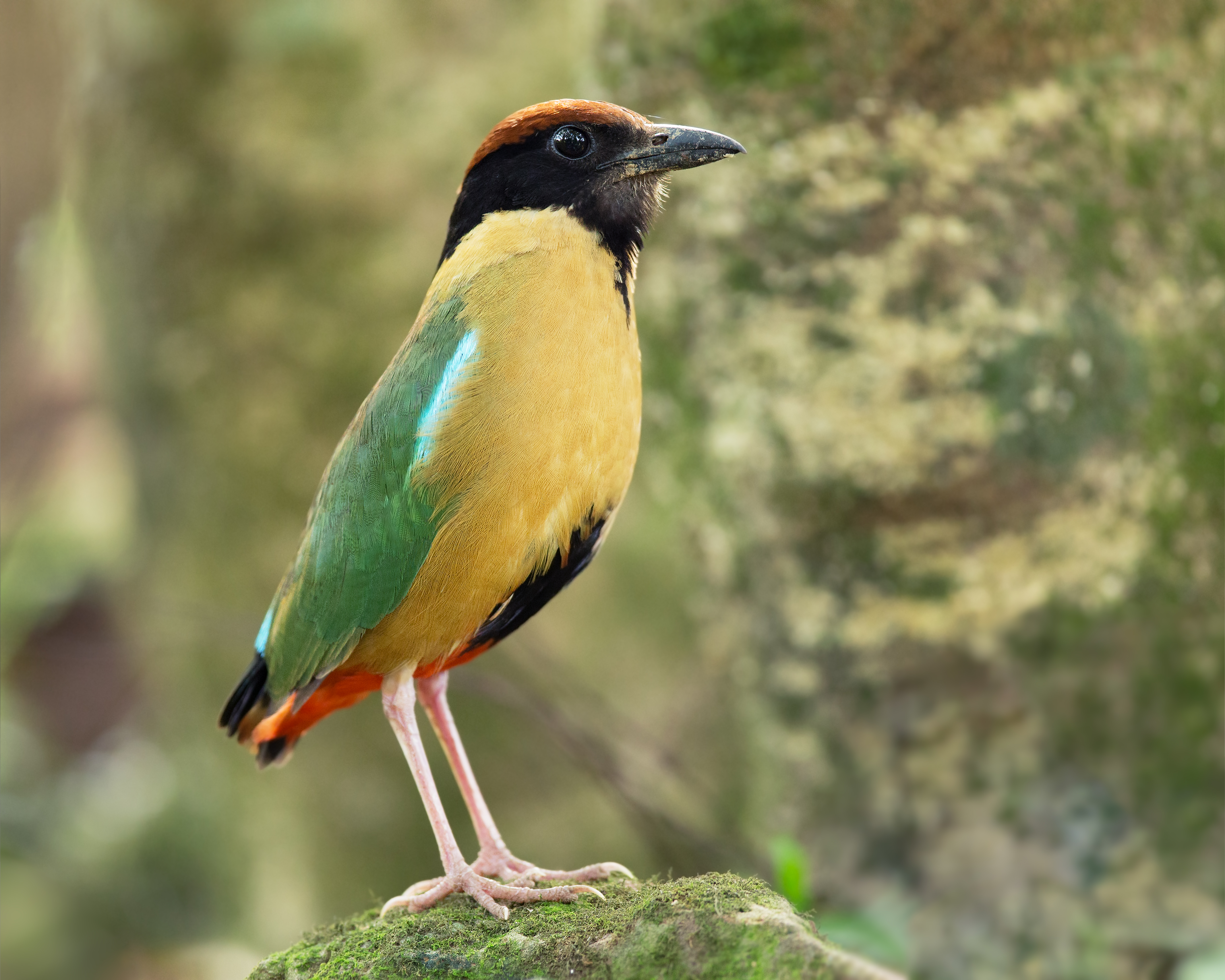
- Noisy pitta in Australia

Scientific classification
- Kingdom: Animalia
- Phylum: Chordata
- Class: Aves
- Order: Passeriformes
- Family: Pittidae
- Genus: Pitta; Vieillot, 1816

Type species
- Corvus brachyurus Linnaeus, 1766

Species
- See text

Audio
- Call of blue-winged pitta

= Pitta (genus) =

Genus of birds

Pitta is a genus of birds in the Pittidae, or pitta family. They are secretive, brightly coloured birds that forage on the forest floor. They are long-legged and short-tailed with rounded wings. They all have green on their upperparts with blue wing-patches. Many have dark heads. Nest construction, incubation and rearing of nestlings is performed by both parents. Incubation is completed in some 17 days, and the nestlings are altricial and nidicolous. Some species are migratory.

The antpittas, a Neotropical bird family of some 50 species, resemble the pittas in their hopping gait, furtive behaviour, long legs and short tails.

== Taxonomy ==
The genus Pitta was erected by the French ornithologist Louis Pierre Vieillot in 1816. In 1855 the English ornithologist George Robert Gray designated the type species as Corvus triostegus Sparrman. This is a junior synonym of Corvus brachyura Linnaeus, the Indian pitta. The word Pitta is from the Telugu language and means "pretty", "bauble" or "pet".

The genus contains 20 species, distributed from Africa, through southern, eastern and south-eastern Asia, to New Guinea, the Solomon Islands and Australia. It was formerly the sole genus in the family and contained 31 species. However, following a 2006 study, some of the species were split off into two resurrected genera, Erythropitta and Hydrornis, though all members of the family continue to be known as "pittas".

== Species ==
The genus contains 20 species:

Image	Scientific name	Common name	Distribution
	Pitta angolensis	African pitta	tropical and subtropical Africa
	Pitta reichenowi	Green-breasted pitta	tropical Africa
	Pitta brachyura	Indian pitta	Indian subcontinent
	Pitta moluccensis	Blue-winged pitta	Australia and Southeast Asia
	Pitta megarhyncha	Mangrove pitta	eastern India to western Southeast Asia
	Pitta sordida	Western hooded pitta	mainland and maritime Southeast Asia
	Pitta abbotti	Nicobar hooded pitta	Nicobar Islands
	Pitta forsteni	Minahasa hooded pitta	north Sulawesi
	Pitta novaeguineae	Eastern hooded pitta	New Guinea
	Pitta rosenbergii	Biak hooded pitta	Biak (Cenderawasih Bay islands, northwest New Guinea)
	Pitta nympha	Fairy pitta	East Asia
	Pitta versicolor	Noisy pitta	eastern Australia and southern New Guinea
	Pitta maxima	Ivory-breasted pitta	North Maluku
	Pitta concinna	Ornate pitta	Lesser Sunda Islands
	Pitta elegans	Elegant pitta	Lesser Sunda Islands
	Pitta vigorsii	Banda Sea pitta	Maluku Islands
	Pitta anerythra	Black-faced pitta	western Melanesia
	Pitta steerii	Azure-breasted pitta	Philippines
	Pitta superba	Superb pitta	Manus Island (north of Papua New Guinea)
	Pitta iris	Rainbow pitta	northern Australia
