= Nyata =

Island in the Banda Sea

Coordinates: 07°31′14″S 127°17′19″E

- Interactive map of Nyata
- Other names: Pulau Nyata

Geography
- Location: Banda Sea
- Archipelago: Malay Archipelago
- Adjacent to: Romang
- Area: 4.379 km^{2} (1.691 sq mi)
- Coastline: 8.216 km (5.1052 mi)
- Highest elevation: 167 m (548 ft)

Administration
- Indonesia

Additional information
- Time zone: WIT (UTC+9)

Nyata, also called Pulau Nyata, is an island in the Barat Daya Islands in the Banda Sea, part of the Malay Archipelago. It is northwest of Romang, in the Banda Sea.

== Geography ==
Nyata has a total land area of 4.379 square kilometers, with a coastline 8.2 kilometers long. It is located in the Banda Sea, and is part of the Malay Archipelago. It has a mean elevation of 69 meters above sea level, with a maximum elevation of 167 meters. It is located on the Australian tectonic plate.

=== Vegetation ===
The vast majority of the island is covered in a deciduous broadleaf forest, consisting of Broadleaf trees that shed their leaves seasonally. The island has a tree coverage of 71%.

== Climate ==
Nyata is inside of a Tropical climate zone, categorized as a Tropical savanna. Temperatures remain high year-round, with distinct dry and wet seasons. The island experiences significant rainfall during the wet season, while experiencing major drought during the dry season.

== Infrastructure ==
Nyata has neither a public airport nor a public port located on the island; the nearest public airport is Jos Orno Imsula Airport, located 96 km away, while the nearest port is DILI, located 219 km away.

== Wildlife ==
=== Birds ===
Several Banda sea bird species have been recorded on Nyata. The Malaysian plover, a near-threatened species appearing throughout western Indonesia and the surrounding areas, was observed on the island. Additionally, a call from a Ruddy-breasted crake was heard, implying that they inhabit the island as well. Other recorded species on the island include the White-breasted waterhen, the Bar-necked cuckoo-dove, the Rose-crowned fruit dove, the Pink-headed imperial pigeon, the Little bronze cuckoo, the Elegant pitta, the Broad-billed flycatcher, the Arafura fantail, the Wallacean whistler, the Scaly-breasted honeyeater, and the Ashy-bellied white-eye.
