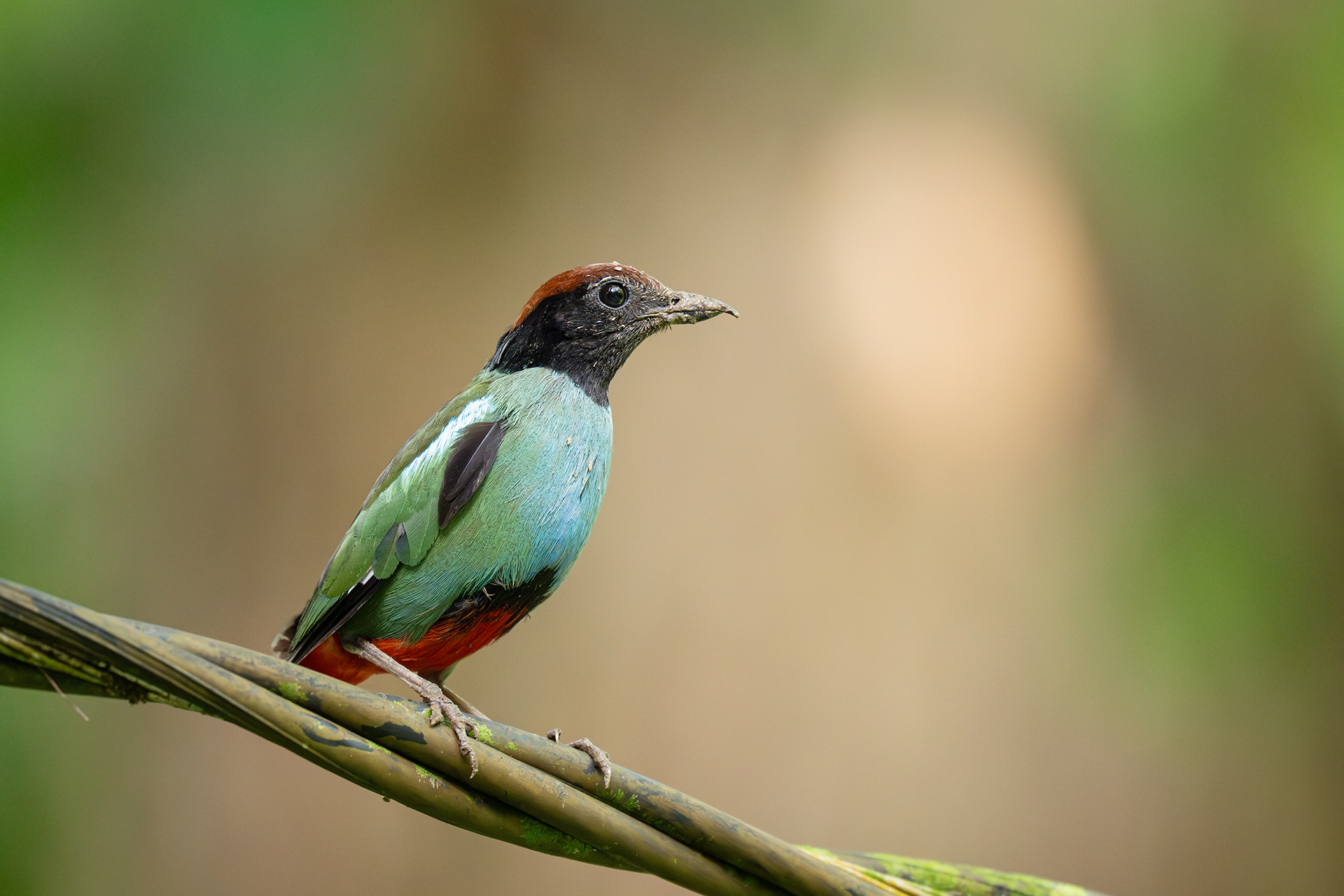

Scientific classification
- Kingdom: Animalia
- Phylum: Chordata
- Class: Aves
- Order: Passeriformes
- Family: Pittidae
- Genus: Pitta
- Species: P. abbotti

Binomial name
- Pitta abbotti Richmond, 1902

= Nicobar hooded pitta =

Species of bird

The Nicobar hooded pitta (Pitta abbotti) is a species of passerine bird in the family Pittidae that is endemic to the Nicobar Islands in the eastern Indian Ocean.

It is a green bird with a black head and chestnut crown. It forages on the ground for insects and their larvae, and also eats berries. It breeds between February and August, the pair being strongly territorial and building their nest on the ground. Incubation and care of the fledglings is done by both parents. It was formerly considered to be a subspecies of the hooded pitta, now renamed to the western hooded pitta.

== Taxonomy ==
The Nicobar hooded pitta was formally described in 1902 by the American ornithologist Charles Wallace Richmond from a specimen collected by the naturalist William Louis Abbott on Great Nicobar Island in the eastern Indian Ocean. Richmond coined the binomial name Pitta abbotti where the specific epithet was chosen to honour the collector. The Nicobar hooded pitta was formerly considered to be a subspecies of the hooded pitta (Pitta sordida; now the western hooded pitta). It is considered as a separate species based on the significant genetic and morphological differences. The species is monotypic: no subspecies are recognised.
