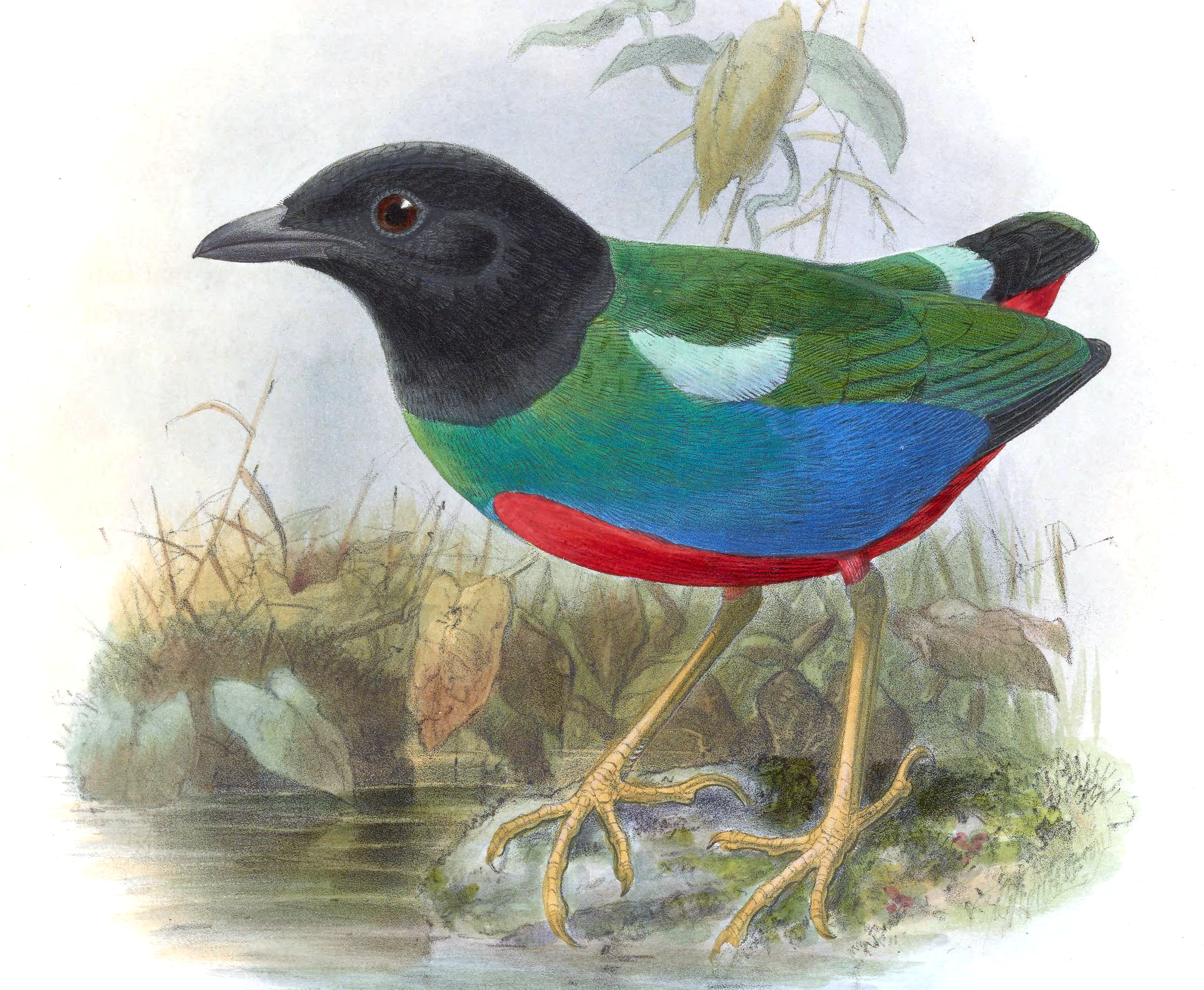

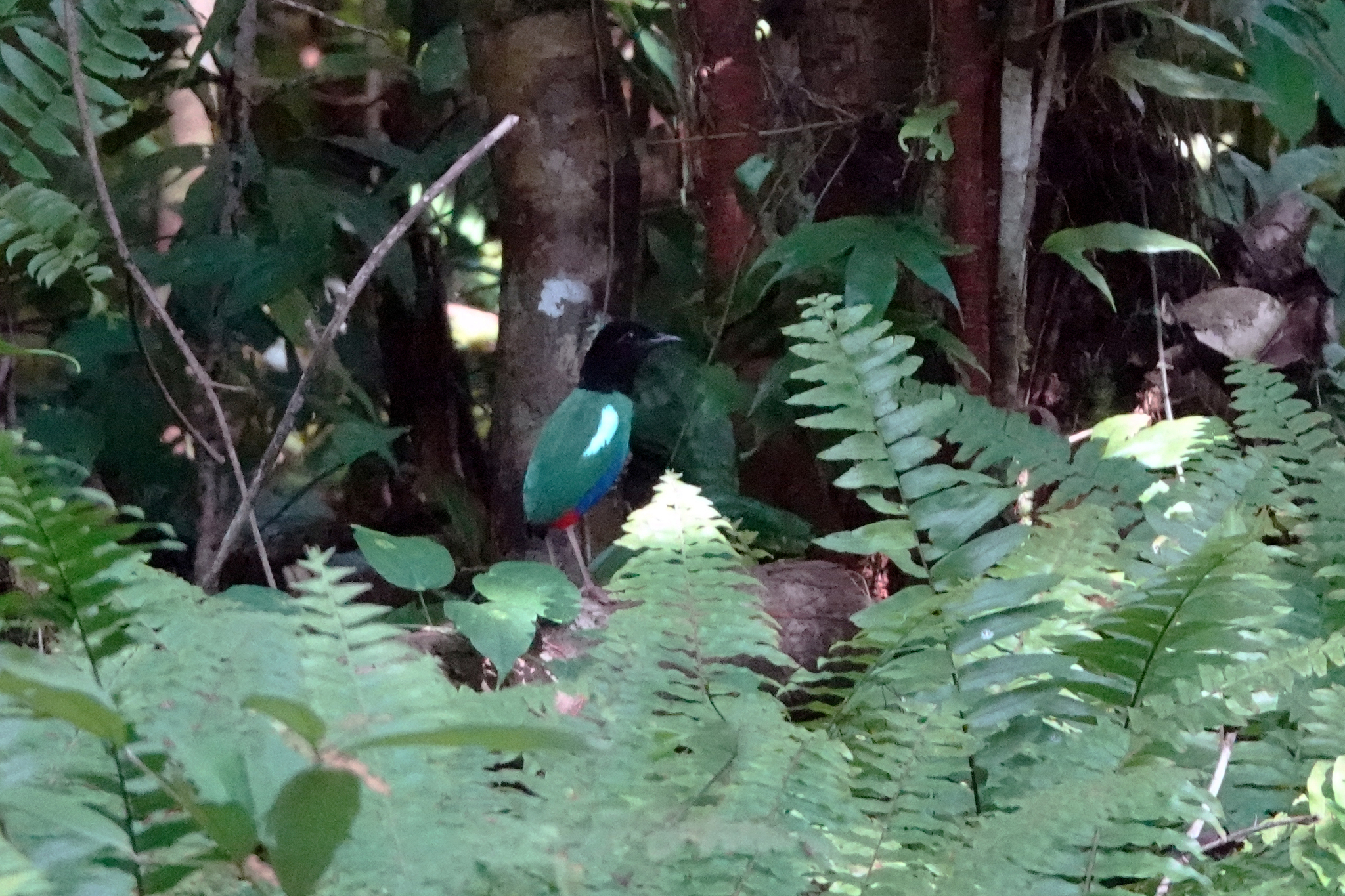

Conservation status
- Near Threatened (IUCN 3.1)

Scientific classification
- Kingdom: Animalia
- Phylum: Chordata
- Class: Aves
- Order: Passeriformes
- Family: Pittidae
- Genus: Pitta
- Species: P. rosenbergii

Binomial name
- Pitta rosenbergii Schlegel, 1871

= Biak hooded pitta =

Species of bird

The Biak hooded pitta (Pitta rosenbergii) is a passerine bird in the pitta family Pittidae that is endemic to the island of Biak, northwest of New Guinea.

It is a green bird with a black head and chestnut crown. It forages on the ground for insects and their larvae, and also eats berries. It breeds between February and August, the pair being strongly territorial and building their nest on the ground. Incubation and care of the fledglings is done by both parents. It was formerly considered to be a subspecies of the hooded pitta, now renamed to the western hooded pitta.

== Taxonomy ==
The Biak hooded pitta was formally described in 1871 by the German naturalist Hermann Schlegel from a specimen that had been collected by Hermann von Rosenberg. Schlegel coined the binomial name Pitta rosenbergii where the specific epithet was chosen to honour the collector. The Biak hooded pitta was formerly considered to be a subspecies of the hooded pitta (Pitta sordida) (renamed as the western hooded pitta). It is now considered as a separate species based on the genetic, morphological and vocal differences. The species is monotypic: no subspecies are recognised.
