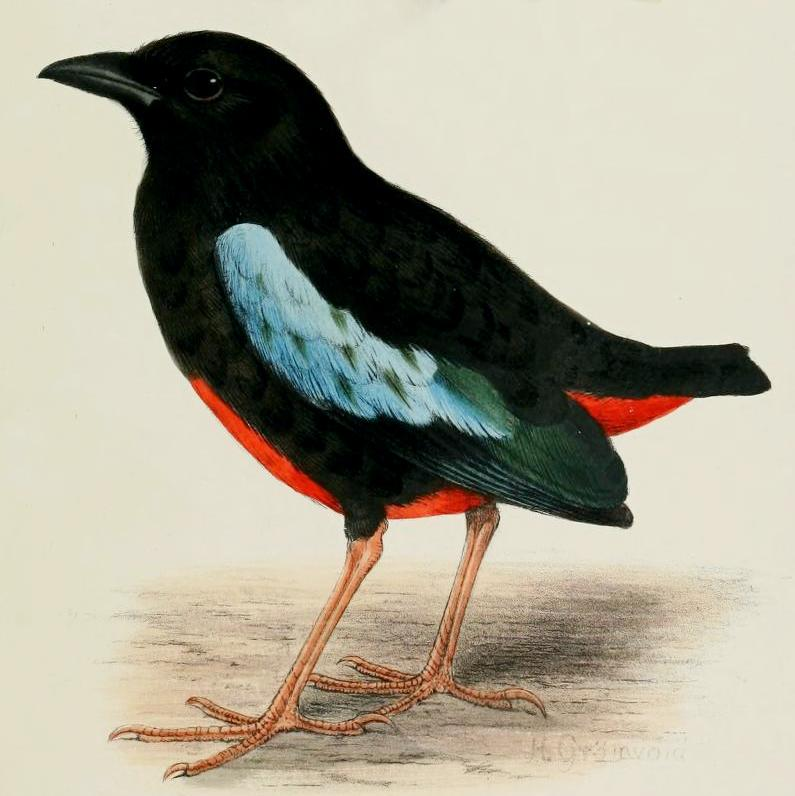

Conservation status
- Endangered (IUCN 3.1)

Scientific classification
- Kingdom: Animalia
- Phylum: Chordata
- Class: Aves
- Order: Passeriformes
- Family: Pittidae
- Genus: Pitta
- Species: P. superba

Binomial name
- Pitta superba Rothschild & Hartert, 1914

= Superb pitta =

Species of bird

The superb pitta (Pitta superba) is a large pitta that is endemic to Manus Island which lies to the north of Papua New Guinea.

== Description ==
The superb pitta is about 22 cm (8.7 in) long. It has black plumage with turquoise blue wings, a scarlet belly and green-tipped secondaries. The sexes are very similar but the female is a slightly smaller and duller than the male. As with other pittas, it is a secretive and rarely seen terrestrial bird. The diet consists mainly of snails.

== Distribution and habitat ==
The superb pitta is distributed and endemic to primary and secondary forests of Manus Island of Papua New Guinea. Due to ongoing habitat loss, limited range and small population size, it is evaluated as endangered on the IUCN Red List of Threatened Species.

== Gallery ==
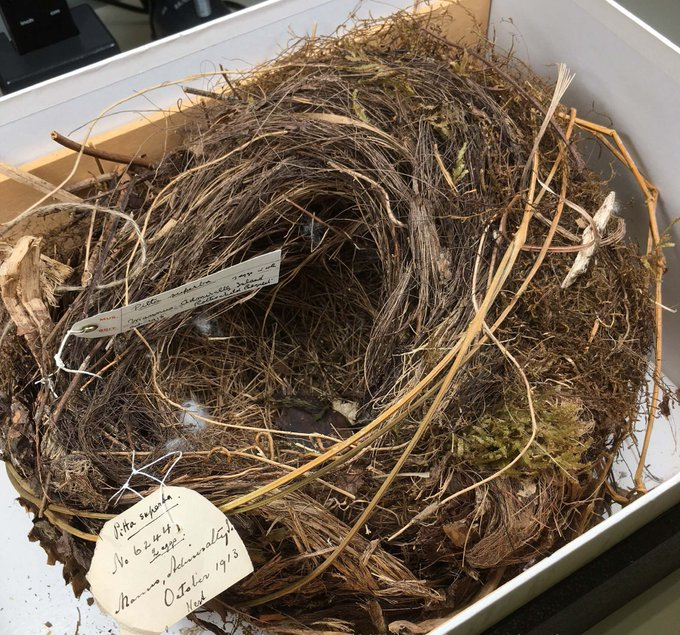
Nest of Superb Pitta

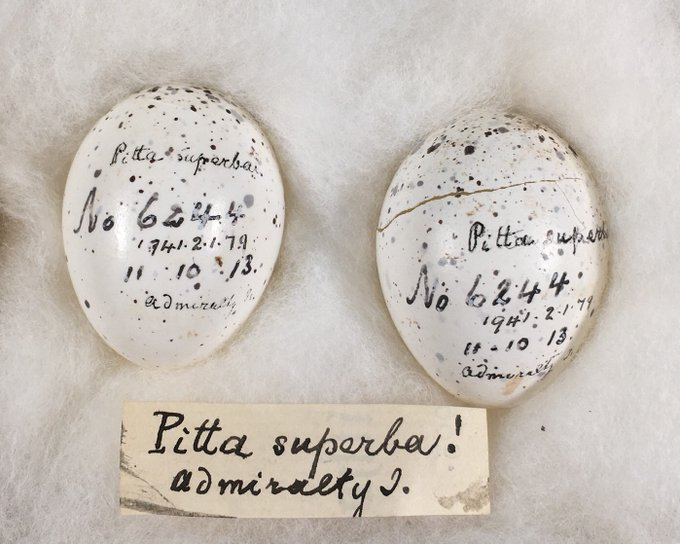
Eggs of Superb Pitta
