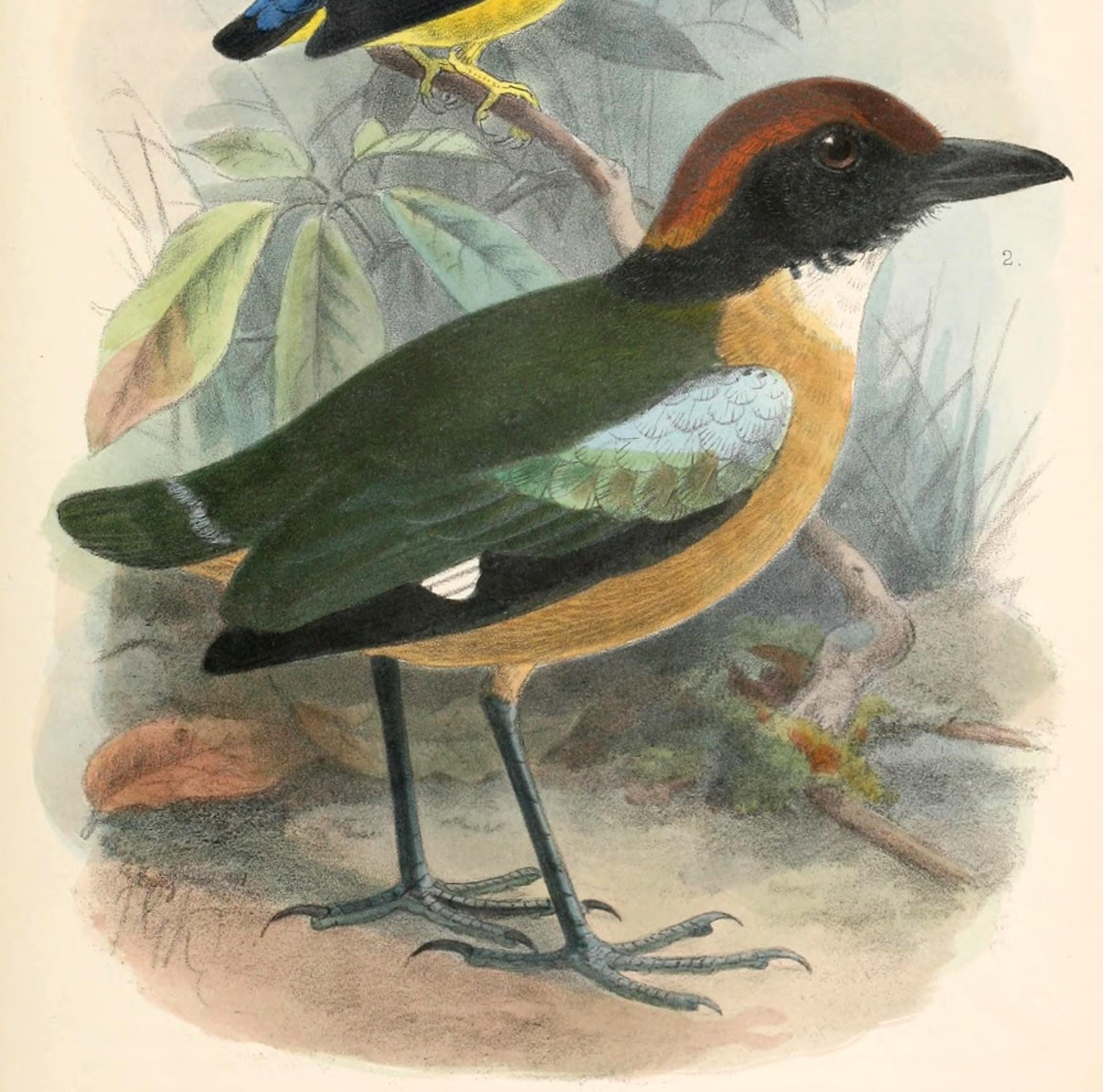

Conservation status
- Near Threatened (IUCN 3.1)

Scientific classification
- Kingdom: Animalia
- Phylum: Chordata
- Class: Aves
- Order: Passeriformes
- Family: Pittidae
- Genus: Pitta
- Species: P. anerythra

Binomial name
- Pitta anerythra Rothschild, 1901
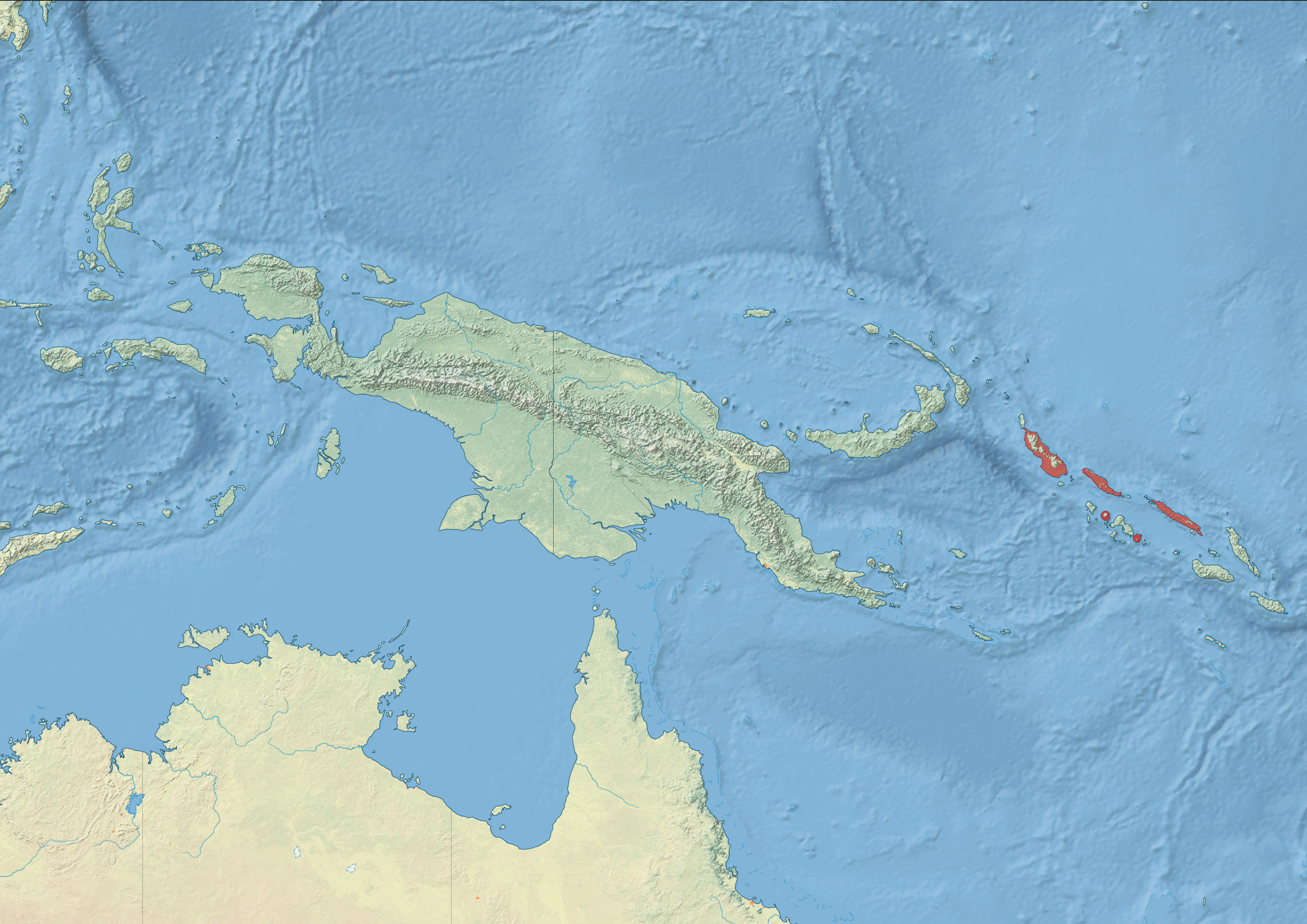
- The Distribution of the Black-faced Pitta

= Black-faced pitta =

Species of bird

The black-faced pitta (Pitta anerythra) is a species of bird in the family Pittidae. It is found on Bougainville Island in Papua New Guinea (subspecies pallida), and Choiseul Island (subspecies nigrifrons) as well as Santa Isabel Island (nominate form) in the Solomon Islands. Its natural habitat is subtropical or tropical moist lowland forest. It is threatened by habitat loss and most certainly by introduced predators and/or competitors.
