= Layoni, Indonesia =

Coordinates: 06°58′59″S 129°07′59″E

Layoni (also Layeni) is a village in the Maluku Islands of Indonesia.
