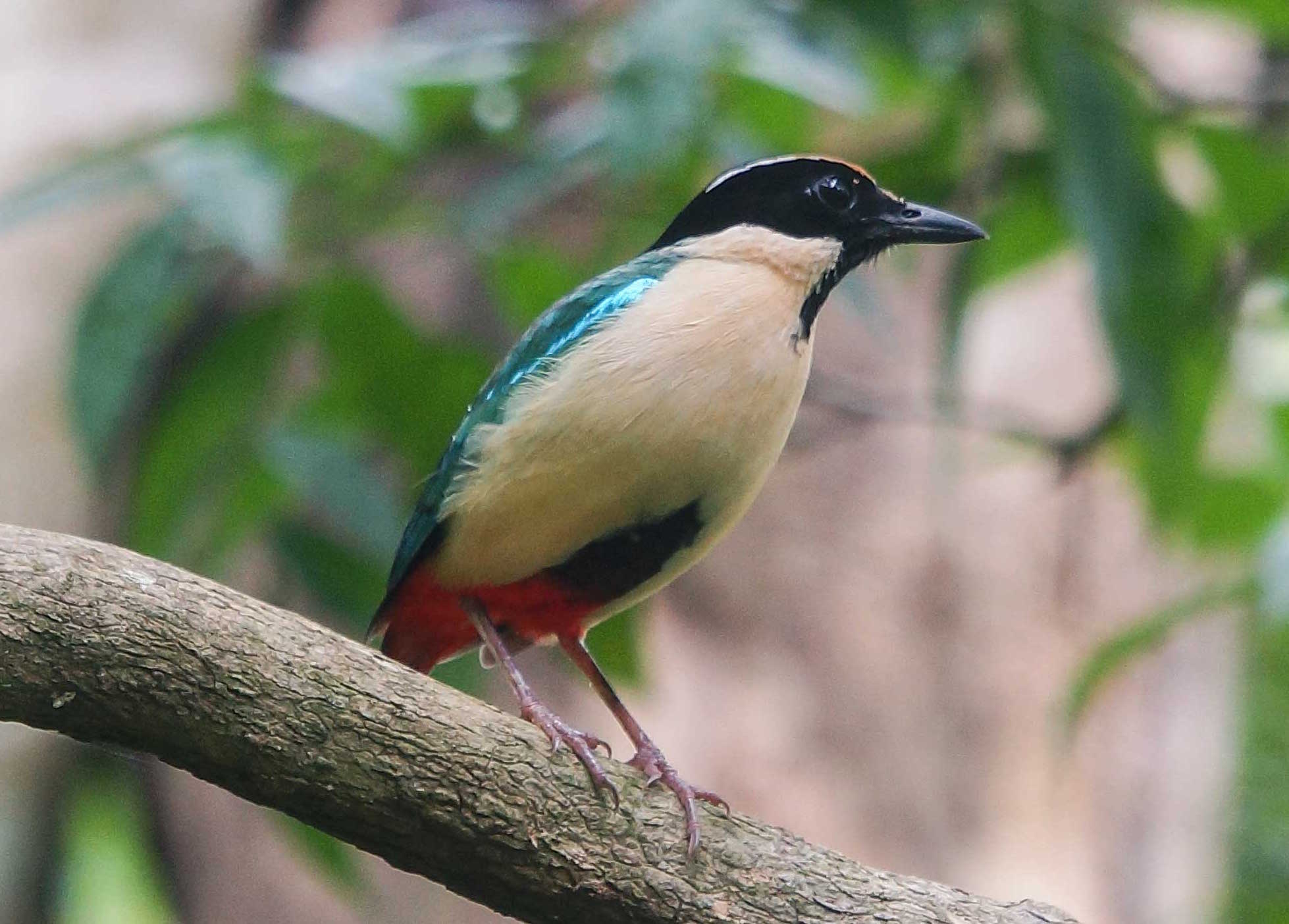

Conservation status
- Least Concern (IUCN 3.1)

Scientific classification
- Kingdom: Animalia
- Phylum: Chordata
- Class: Aves
- Order: Passeriformes
- Family: Pittidae
- Genus: Pitta
- Species: P. elegans

Binomial name
- Pitta elegans Temminck, 1836

= Elegant pitta =

Species of bird

The elegant pitta (Pitta elegans) is a species of passerine bird in the pitta family Pittidae. It is endemic to Indonesia, where it is found in the Lesser Sunda Islands and Moluccas.

== Taxonomy and subspecies distribution ==
The elegant pitta was described and illustrated by the Dutch zoologist Coenraad Jacob Temminck in 1836 from a specimen collected on the island of Timor. Temminck coined the binomial name Pitta elegans.

The elegant pitta has sometimes been treated as a subspecies of the Indian pitta (P. brachyura), noisy pitta (P. versicolor) or blue-winged pitta (P. moluccensis).

Four subspecies are recognised:

- P. e. virginalis Hartert, 1896 – the small islands of Tanahjampea, Kalaotoa, and Kalao (between Sulawesi and Flores)
- P. e. hutzi Meise, 1942 – island of Nusa Penida (southeast of Bali)
- P. e. maria Hartert, 1896 – island of Sumba (south Lesser Sundas)
- P. e. elegans Temminck, 1836 – island of Timor and surrounding islands

Three other subspecies have been described but are now lumped in the preceding subspecies.

== Distribution and habitat ==
It is endemic to the Lesser Sunda Islands and Moluccas in Indonesia. It is reported as also being found in East Timor by some authors, but the species has only been recorded on the western half of the island, in spite of suitable habitat. Its natural habitats are tropical dry forests and tropical moist lowland forests.

The nominate race is found in Timor, Semau, and Kisar. P. e. maria is found on Sumba, and P. e. concinna is found on Flores, Lombok and nearby islands. P. e. virginalis is found on Tanahjampea, Kalao and Kalaotoa, to the south of Sulawesi

== Description ==
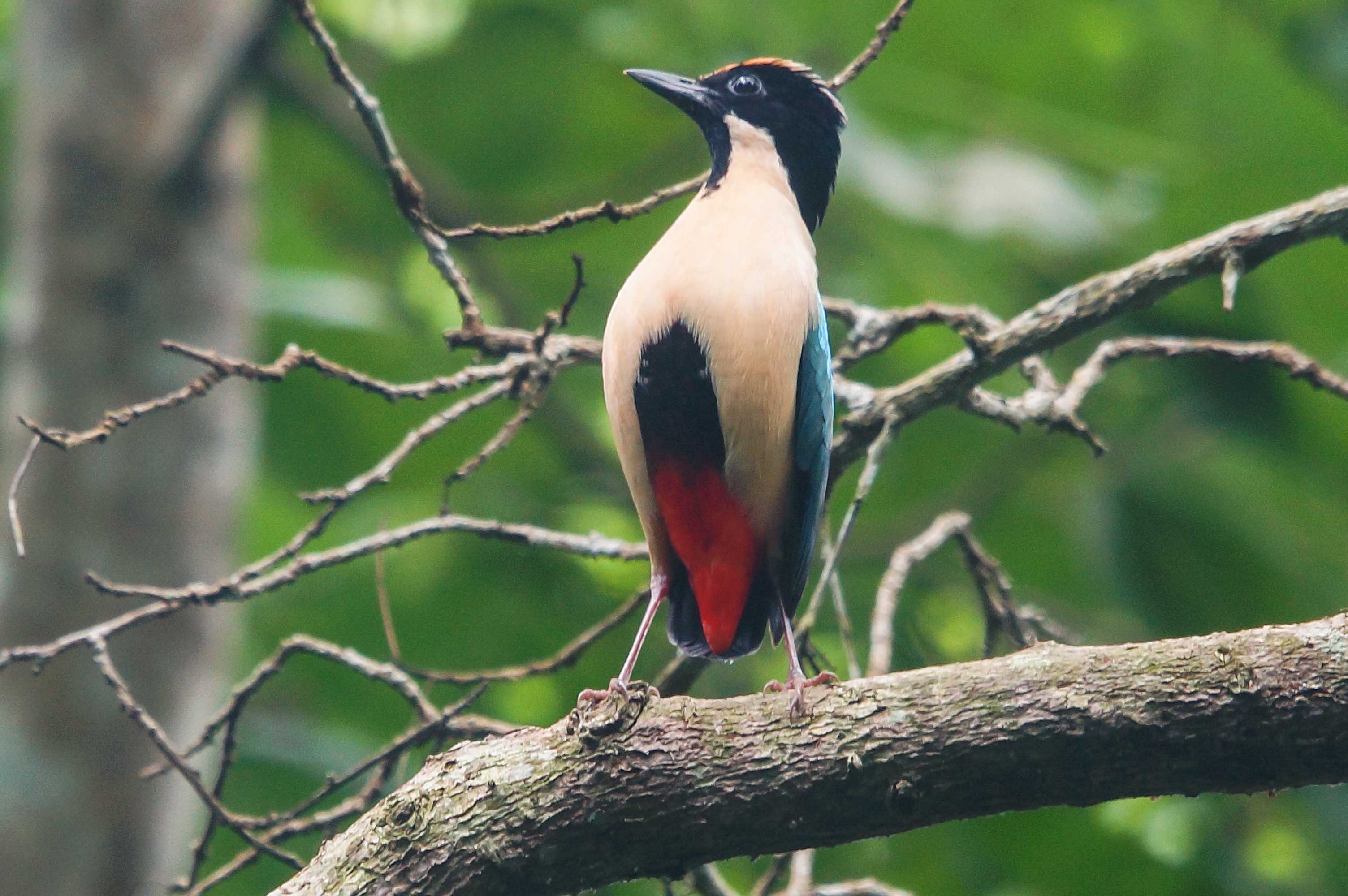
The belly of the elegant pitta is red.

The elegant pitta is 19 cm (7.5 in) long and weighs 47–77 g (1.7–2.7 oz). It has a black head, throat, chin and neck with a buff crown stripe. The upperparts are dark green, as are most of the wings, which also have a bright turquoise patch on the lesser coverts. The rump is turquoise-blue and the tail is black with a green tip. The underparts are mostly warm buff, with the centre black with a red patch below. The sexes are similar.
