= Zarafa (film) =

- Theatrical release poster
- Directed by: Rémi Bezançon; Jean-Christophe Lie
- Written by: Rémi Bezançon; Alexander Abela
- Produced by: Christophe Jankovic; Valérie Schermann
- Starring: Max Renaudin; Simon Abkarian; Ronit Elkabetz; François-Xavier Demaison; Thierry Frémont
- Edited by: Sophie Reine
- Music by: Laurent Perez
- Production companies: Pathé; Prima Linea Productions; France 3 Cinéma; Chaocorp; Scope Pictures
- Distributed by: Pathé Distribution
- Release date: 8 February 2012 (France)
- Running time: 78 minutes
- Countries: France; Belgium
- Language: French
- Budget: $8.6 million
- Box office: $11.3 million

Zarafa is a 2012 French-Belgian animated film directed by Rémi Bezançon and Jean-Christophe Lie. It was released on 8 February 2012 in France. The story was inspired by a historical giraffe known today as Zarafa.

== Plot ==
The film is framed by a village elder (Vernon Dobtcheff) telling a story to a group of eager children.

Set in the early 19th Century, the story tells of Maki (Max Renaudin), a ten-year-old orphaned Sudanese boy who has been sold into slavery with his friend Soula. He escapes the abusive slave trader Moreno (Thierry Frémont) and comes across a young giraffe and its mother. Moreno catches up to Maki and kills the mother giraffe. Maki promises the calf's mother that he'll protect and nurture her. Just as Moreno is about to take him to his slave camp, Hassan, a Bedouin nomad prince (Simon Abkarian), intervenes and saves his life. Maki follows Hassan as soon as he takes the giraffe with him. Hassan names the giraffe Zarafa (Arabic for "giraffe") and reluctantly agrees to take care of Maki and Zarafa. They come across a merchant, Mahmoud, who gives them two Tibetan cows, Mounh and Sounh. Maki discovers Soula being forced into slave labor by Moreno. When the rogue turns his attention on Maki, Soula hits him with a palm leaf, but before Moreno can beat her with his whip, Maki cries out for her and Hassan steps in. Maki thanks Hassan for saving him.

Hassan is on a mission to the Pasha of Egypt, Mehemet Ali, who wants to offer a young giraffe to the King of France, Charles X, to convince him to unite his country against the Ottomans besieging Alexandria. Maki and Hassan join together with the aeronaut Malaterre (François-Xavier Demaison), who agrees to take Zarafa to Paris via a hot air balloon. Hassan convinces Maki to leave Zarafa, but Malaterre thinks otherwise, seeing Maki's determination, and takes the boy with them. The basket gets heavy, so the cows jump overboard, and Hassan unwittingly tosses Maki after them, as Maki is hidden in a bale of hay. Maki and the two cows land on a pirate ship, where they come across the pirate queen Bouboulina and her ragtag crew. Maki explains that he is in pursuit of a treasure of great value aboard the balloon. Instead of taking him prisoner, Bouboulina welcomes Maki to her crew. Meanwhile, Moreno is determined to hunt down Maki and arrives on shore with Soula in tow. Bouboulina and her crew rescue Maki and scare off Moreno and his henchmen. The group continues on their journey. During a perilous crossing of the mountains where the balloon crashed, one of the cows is taken by a pack of grey wolves.

Hassan, Maki, Malaterre, and the surviving cow eventually reach Paris. The cynical King Charles accepts the gift but refuses to help the Pasha. Zarafa is shut away in the city zoo, and Maki stays firm about returning the giraffe to her home. Moreno kidnaps him and forces him to work in his household. Hassan is ashamed that he had failed his mission and mortified to have lost Maki, so he sinks into despair and alcohol. As several years pass, Zarafa's appearance causes "giraffe mania" and she grows up. Maki finds himself at the zoo with Soula. King Charles is receiving a new hippopotamus, and, remembering an experience he had with one before meeting Hassan, Maki tells Soula to hold up her parasol. Maki does the same and the hippo squirts a colossal pile of dung onto King Charles and his subjects, giving the children enough time to make a getaway. They manage to find Malaterre and Maki plans to escape with Zarafa in the hot air balloon. The trio locate Hassan, but the nomad is unable to help them, since he has become an alcoholic. They rush to free Zarafa, but now she is too large to fit into the balloon. Maki realizes that he must give up Zarafa and escape with Soula. Moreno appears and prepares to kill Maki, but Hassan steps in to protect them and is shot. Aided by Malaterre, Maki and Soula escape in the balloon. Moreno gives chase, but the two friends bite him and he falls off the basket and into an enclosure where he is devoured by a polar bear. Maki and Soula return home, marry, and found a flourishing new village. Hassan, treated at the hospital, survives his wounds and falls in love with Bouboulina.

As it turns out, the storyteller is actually Maki himself.

== Voice cast ==
=== French version ===
- Simon Abkarian as Hassan
- Abraham Adesoye as Pika
- François-Xavier Demaison as Malaterre
- Vernon Dobtcheff as Le vieux sage
- Roger Dumas as Charles X
- Ronit Elkabetz as Bouboulina
- Mohamed Fellag as Mahmoud
- Déborah François as Zarafa adulte
- Thierry Frémont as Moreno
- Dazzy Iannuzzio Bogo
- Madigan Kacmar as Traore
- Philippe Morier-Genoud as Saint-Hilaire
- Clara Quilichini as Soula
- Max Renaudin as Maki
- Mostéfa Stiti as Pacha

=== English version ===
- Sjaak Caderyn as Hassan
- Joe Ochman as Malaterre (as B.J. Oakie)
- Chinua B. Payne as Lumba
- Mike Pollock as Zuma
- Scott Rayow as Moreno (as Scottie Ray)
- Cindy Robinson as Bouboulina
- Erica Schroeder as Zarafa
- Jason Simon as Charles X, Old Sage
- Zariah Singletary as Deka
- Michael Sorich as Mahmoud
- Joel Stigliano as Pacha
- Raeusi Uraeus as Maki
- Wayne Grayson as Demis
- Nýa-Jolie Walters as Soula

Here is the translated wikitext from French to English Wikipedia format:

== Production ==
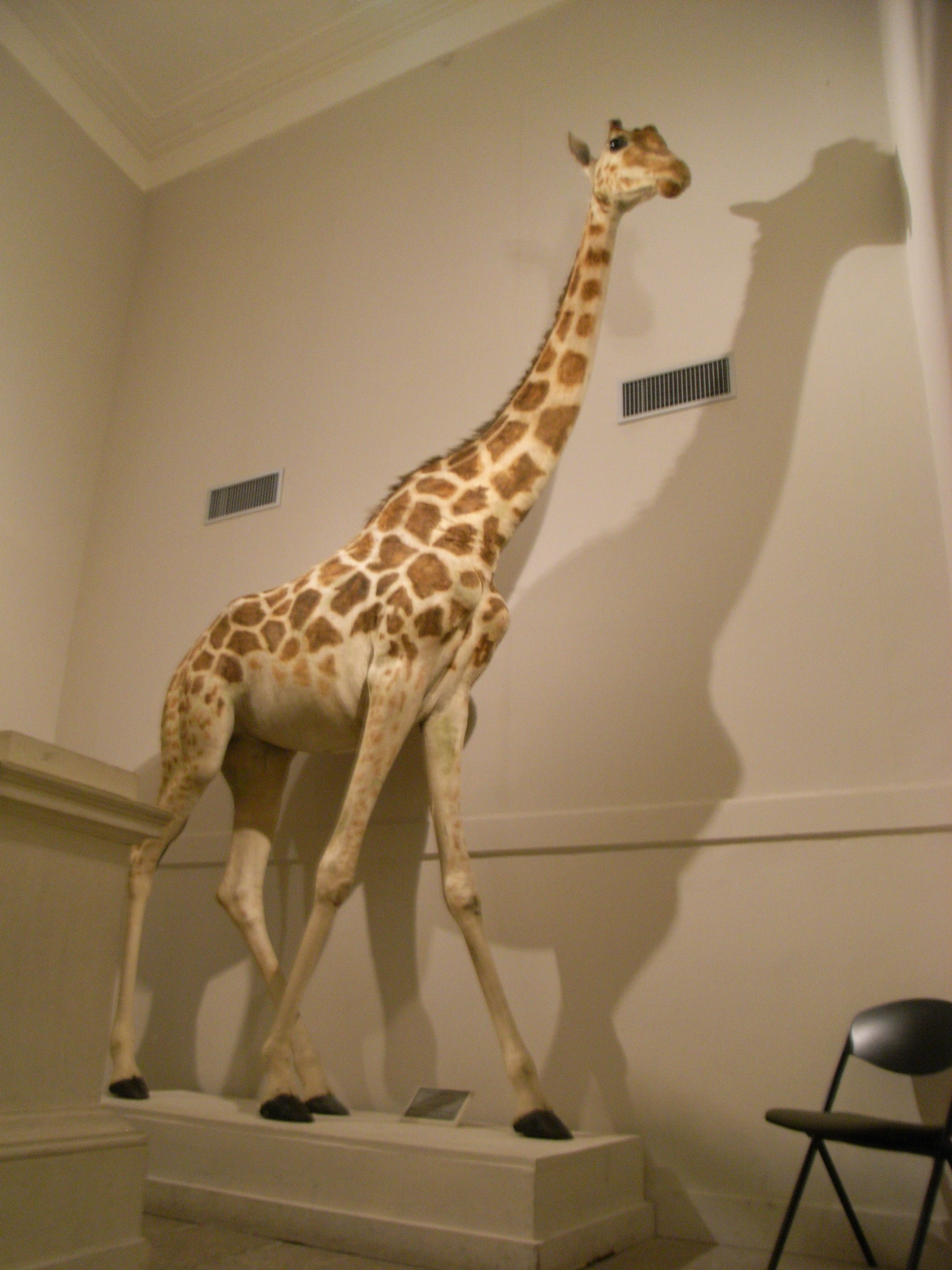
The stuffed giraffe at the Muséum d'histoire naturelle de La Rochelle in 2009.

Rémi Bezançon directed the film in collaboration with Marie Caillou, and later with Jean-Christophe Lie. For the screenplay, Rémi Bezançon loosely based it on the story of the giraffe given to Charles X by Méhémet Ali, without seeking historical accuracy, but with the idea of crafting ''an extraordinary adventure, somewhat inspired by Jules Verne''. The screenplay was written by Alexandre Abela and Rémi Bezançon, with the collaboration of Jean-François Halin and Vanessa Portal. The final budget of the film amounted to €8.2 million.

Zarafa was among the films selected for the Berlinale 2012.

== Reception ==
=== Critical reception ===
Among favorable reviews, Florence Colombani, in Le Point, gave a very positive review, stating that ''Charming and entertaining, the film primarily addresses those under ten, but also satisfies the educational aspirations of parents'', while noting that the filmmakers had ''considerably transformed'' the true story of the giraffe to create a ''humanistic and tender tale''. She appreciated the beauty of the graphics and the absence of flashy special effects, as well as the ability of the screenplay to tackle serious subjects without becoming preachy. In Le Journal du dimanche, Jean-Pierre Lacomme viewed Zarafa as ''a success both narratively and visually''. He compared the film to Lawrence of Arabia for its spectacular shots and orientalist music, stating that the film's theme of fighting racism ''primarily addresses children but not exclusively''. In Première, Christophe Narbonne rated the film three out of four stars, believing that the elements of exoticism and pedagogy typical of the genre of tale were added ''without excess''; he especially appreciated the graphics and animation that ''give a true visual identity'' to the film and show that ''2D still has a bright future ahead''. He drew parallels between the film and the works of Michel Ocelot for its African imagery, and also with Sylvain Chomet for the appearance of the characters of Charles X and his court, which provided the film with a degree of ''more adult humor'' and thus achieved a ''balance (...) between fairy tale and satire. Caroline Vié, in 20 minutes, reminded readers of the liberties taken by the filmmakers with the true story of the giraffe and described the film as ''an original and tender animated fable to be enjoyed with family''.

Among more mixed reviews, Isabelle Régnier in Le Monde appreciated the beauty of the landscapes and colors, a well-crafted narrative, and a lovely array of characters. However, she regretted that the film reflected a ''folkloric view of Africa (but also of the s-19th, of the world in general)'' and was lacking in ''substance, truth, and emotion''.

=== Box office ===
Upon its release in France on February 7, 2012, Zarafa was screened on 477 copies. In Paris, where the film was shown on 19 copies, Zarafa drew 2,723 admissions on its opening day, which gave it the second-best opening of the week in the capital, following the spy film Tinker, Tailor, Soldier, Spy (2,907 admissions on 23 copies) and ahead of the 3D re-release of the sci-fi Star Wars: Episode I – The Phantom Menace (1,000 admissions on 14 copies). By the end of its first week, the film had gathered 256,052 admissions. In its second week, an additional 304,554 admissions brought the total past 500,000. In its third week, with 329,595 new admissions, it totaled 890,201. After 219,015 additional admissions in its fourth week, the film crossed the million admissions mark, totaling 1,109,216 admissions after its first month of release. It also gathered 107,160 admissions in its fifth week.

In Belgium, the film was released on February 15, 2012 and distributed across 26 screens.

== Anachronisms and Controversy ==
At the time of Zarafa's journey, Sudan as a country did not exist; this term was an alternate term denoting a larger region, Negroland, which encompassed present-day Sudan. Moreover, there were no European slave traders in this part of Africa, as the Slave Trade there was practiced by Arabs (the Transatlantic Slave Trade that was already nearly extinguished at the time primarily affected the western coasts of Africa, and the cargo did not transit through European ports). Additionally, the slave trade had been officially abolished by France since 1815. Even though authorities turned a blind eye to slave smuggling until the total abolition, it would have been quite discreet for a slaver to travel to the Metropolis with their goods visible to all in 1827. Furthermore, it was in this same year that Charles X officially criminalized the slave trade, increasing penalties. Finally, it is worth noting the absurdity of representing the practice of domestic slavery on the territory of the Metropolis itself, given that its prohibition dates back to the edict of July 3, 1315 promulgated by King Louis X. Slavery in the French colonies was governed by a derogatory status granted by Louis XIII, and the circulation of slaves between the colony and the Metropolis was always heavily monitored.

Catherine Vadon, a lecturer at the National Museum of Natural History, claims that the film does not adhere to historical truth, arguing that the animal was well-treated during both the journey and its stay at the Jardin des Plantes, and the Museum chose to respond to the film through an exhibition titled The True Story of Zarafa.

Another historical testimony exists: an oil painting dated 1831 by Jacques-Raymond Brascassat entitled The Passage of the Giraffe at Arnay-le-Duc. It is exhibited in the Museum of Fine Arts in Beaune. The artist likely painted this work from memory or based on sketches made at the Château de Musigny near Arnay-le-Duc.

In the film, the gift of Zarafa from Egypt to France is portrayed as an attempt by Pasha Ali to obtain French assistance in his war against the Ottomans. In reality, the war between Egypt and the Ottomans broke out several years later. Alexandria was not besieged, and the Egyptians generally gained the upper hand with a front situated only in Syria-Palestine. At that time, the idea of offering a giraffe to Charles X aimed to maintain Franco-Egyptian diplomatic relations, and Egypt was involved in the Greek War of Independence on the Ottoman side. Ironically, one can note that Bouboulina, a Greek heroine of independence, was working against her own cause by aiding the journey of the giraffe in the film.

== Accolades ==
Award	Category	Recipients and nominees	Result
Annie Awards	Directing in a Feature Production	Rémi Bezançon and Jean-Christophe Lie	Nominated
César Award	Best Animated Film	Rémi Bezançon and Jean-Christophe Lie	Nominated
