= Zarafa =

Zarafa may refer to:

- Zarafa (film), an animated film
- Zarafa (giraffe), a present to Charles X of France from Muhammad Ali of Egypt
- Zarafa (software), a groupware software application
