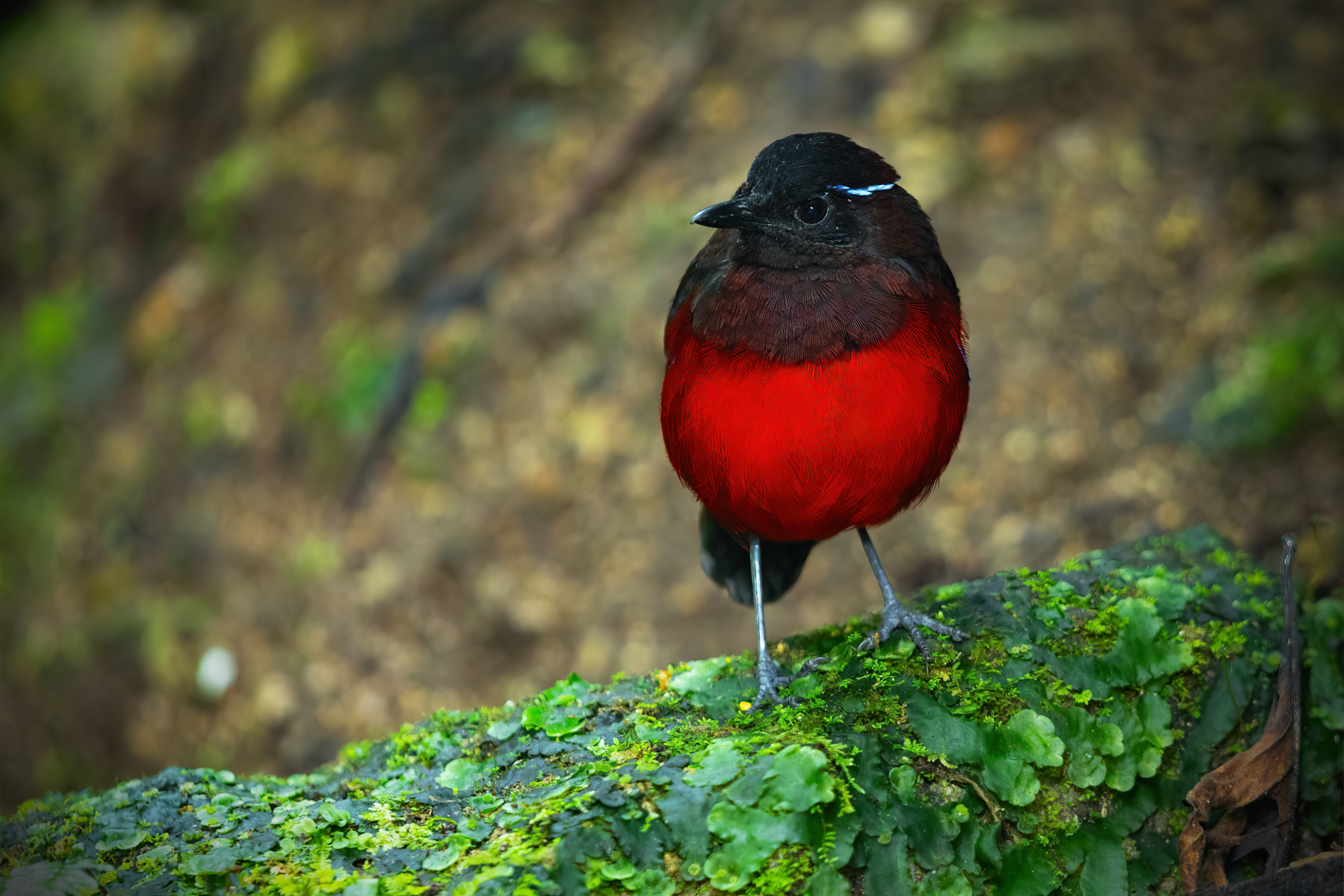

Conservation status
- Least Concern (IUCN 3.1)

Scientific classification
- Kingdom: Animalia
- Phylum: Chordata
- Class: Aves
- Order: Passeriformes
- Family: Pittidae
- Genus: Erythropitta
- Species: E. venusta

Binomial name
- Erythropitta venusta (Müller, S, 1836)

Synonyms
- Pitta venusta

= Graceful pitta =

Species of bird

The graceful pitta (Erythropitta venusta), sometimes alternatively known as the black-crowned pitta (although this term is more regularly applied to Erythropitta ussheri), is a species of bird in the family Pittidae. It occurs in Sumatra in Indonesia, where its natural habitat is subtropical or tropical moist montane forests. It is threatened by habitat loss.

== Taxonomy ==
The graceful pitta was formally described in 1836 by the German naturalist Salomon Müller under the binomial name Pitta venusta. His specimens had been collected in western Sumatra. The specific epithet is from the Latin adjective, venustus, meaning "beautiful" or "lovely". The graceful pitta is now one of 15 species placed in the genus Erythropitta that was introduced in 1854 by Charles Lucien Bonaparte. The species is monotypic: no subspecies are recognised.

== Description ==
The graceful pitta is a petite bird that measures approximately 18 cm (7.1 in) in length. Its black coloring is enhanced with reddish undertones, and the bottom of its wings have vivid blue stripes running down them. The lower breast and abdomen are a dull crimson. The upper chest is dark brown with a purple hue. The legs can appear to be either a purple-blue or a pale blue, and its iris is a dark brown color. The bill is black. The extended tail has reddish-black hues. Males and females show little sexual dimorphism. Juveniles have an all dark brown exterior with less color variation throughout the body. They also have pinkish-grey feet, a red tipped bill, and grayish colored irises.

Its call has been described as a high pitched train whistle which remains at a consistent pitch.

== Distribution and habitat ==
The graceful pitta is a native of the Indonesian Sumatran highlands, which consist of thick tropical forests with various species of plants, animals, and insects. It inhabits dense, moist woods with a thick understory of plants, but its habitat has been decreasing rapidly due to deforestation owing to the demand for palm oil, which Indonesia is the largest producer of.

== Behaviour ==
The graceful pitta flies close to the ground, primarily in residential levels through the trees.

=== Breeding ===
According to research, breeding can take place from May to July, and possibly as early as from February to October. But, only one nesting has been recorded for graceful pittas, which took place in May. The birds construct their nests that typically are placed around 60 centimetres (24 in) above the ground, using materials such as dead leaves, bamboo leaves, fine roots, degraded fibers, and moss. The graceful pitta typically can produce two to three eggs every breeding cycle. Each of the eggs has a distinctive look with a dull white tone and dark brown and gray lilac spots.

== Conservation status ==
The graceful pitta has been legally protected from hunting since 1931. However, its population is primarily threatened by deforestation, besides minor agriculture and aquaculture.

In 2016, it had been rarely observed and thus was provisionally classified Vulnerable, with habitat loss suspected as the reason for the decline of its population, estimated at 2,500-9,999 mature individuals. A re-evaluation in 2023 resulted in the classification being upgraded to Least Concern; the reasons stated were that its range and the population decline rate did not meet the criteria for a Vulnerable classification. The downward trend in its population (evaluated at 5-9%) was considered to be a minor effect attributed to the loss of forest cover in its range. The decline rate was not expected to change drastically in the near future, due to most of its range being within protected areas. The species was also concluded to be elusive rather than rare, having never appeared in trapping records.

== Gallery ==
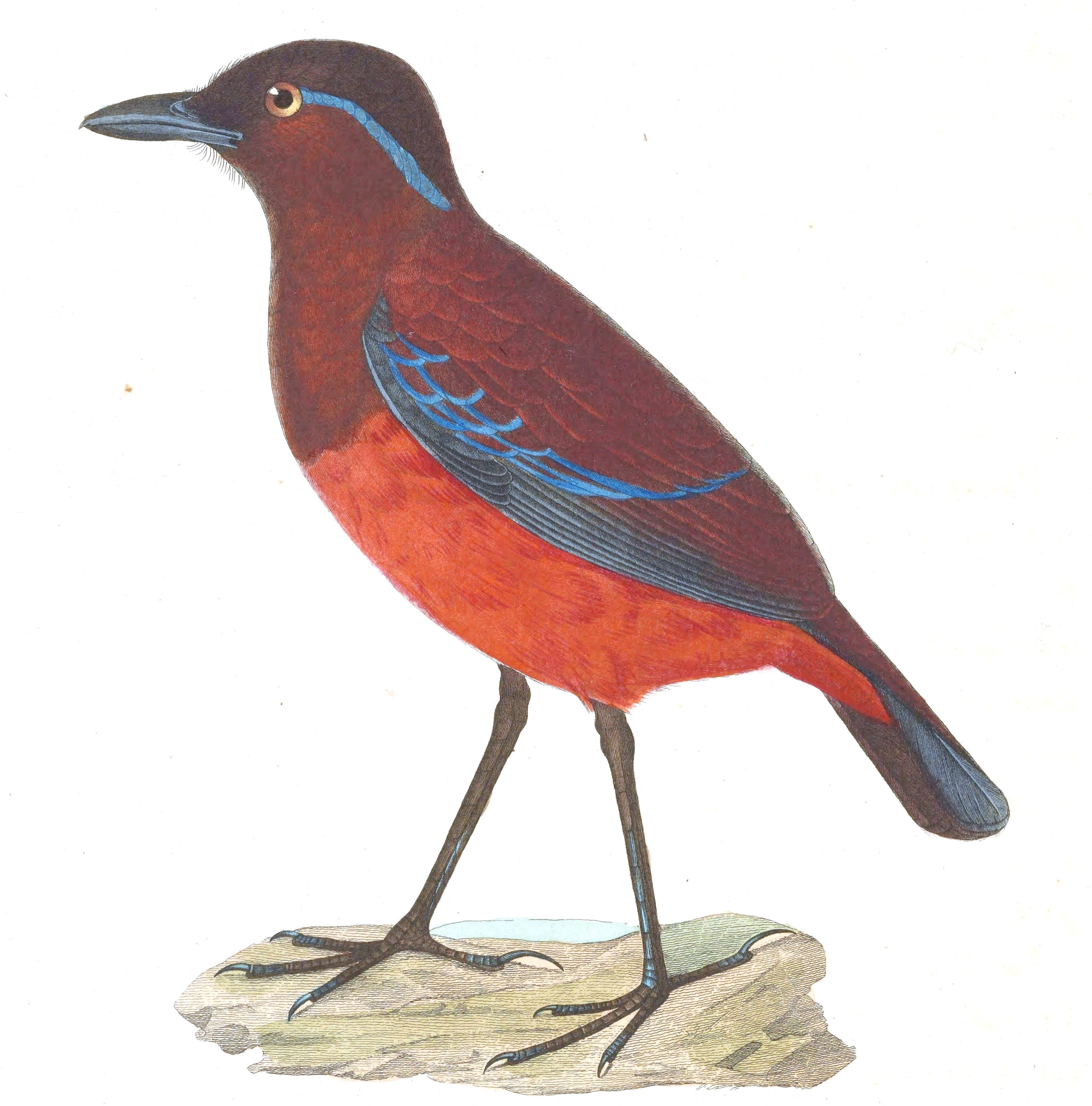
Illustration by Nicolas Hüet

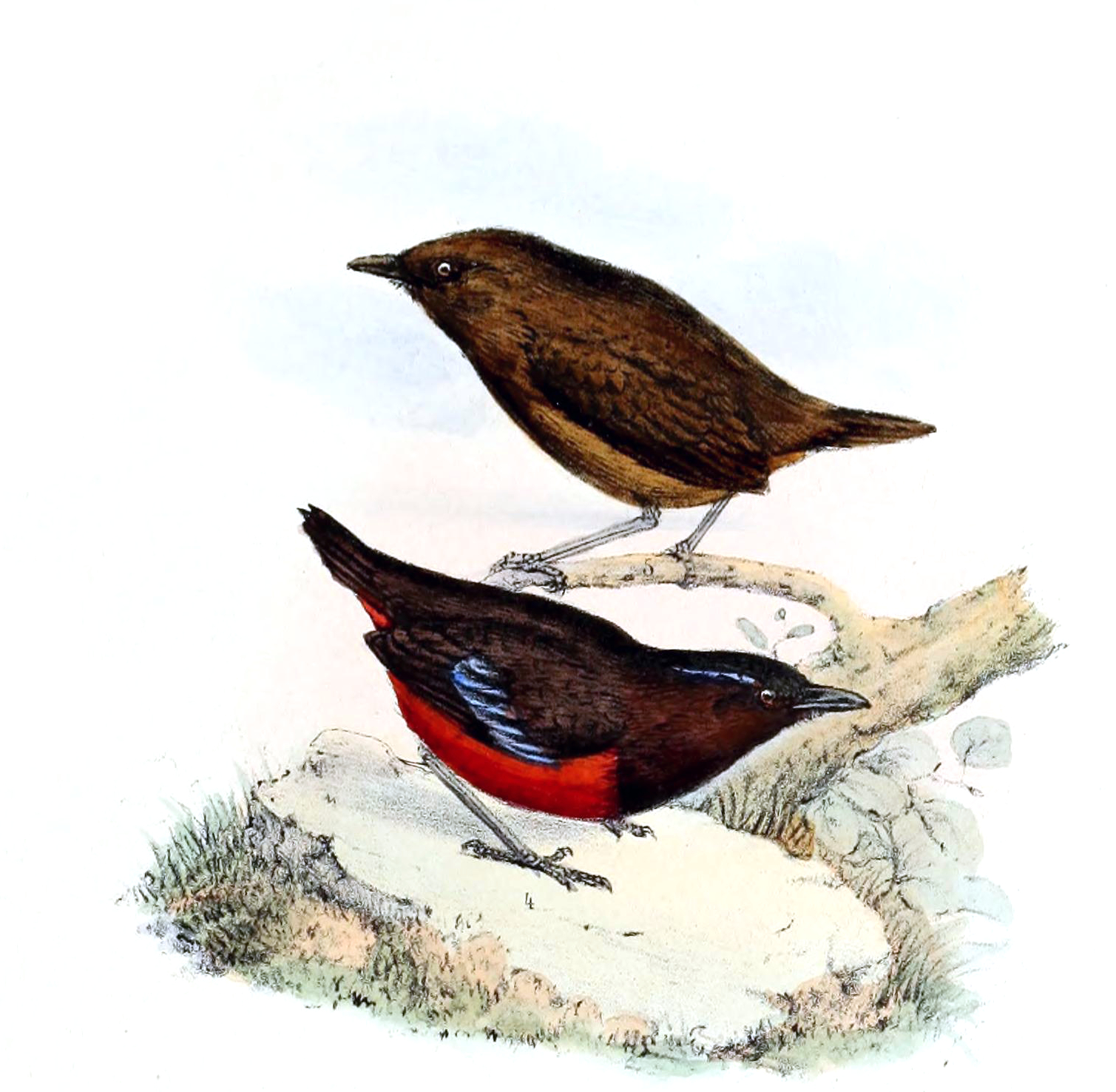
Adult and immature
