= Medici giraffe =

First live giraffe in Europe since Ancient Rome

- Died: January 1488; Florence, Republic of Florence
- Known for: a diplomatic gift from Egypt
- Owner: Lorenzo de' Medici

The Medici giraffe was a giraffe presented to Lorenzo de' Medici in Florence on November 18, 1487, by al-Ashraf Qaitbay, the Burji Mamluk Sultan of Egypt, in an attempt to win the support of the Medici.

Quite possibly the first living giraffe in Europe since the time of Ancient Rome, the Medici giraffe caused a great stir on its arrival in Florence. Although the Medici maintained a large menagerie and had previously featured a giant wooden model of a giraffe in the animal entertainments they provided to the citizenry, this was the first time a living example had been seen in the city.

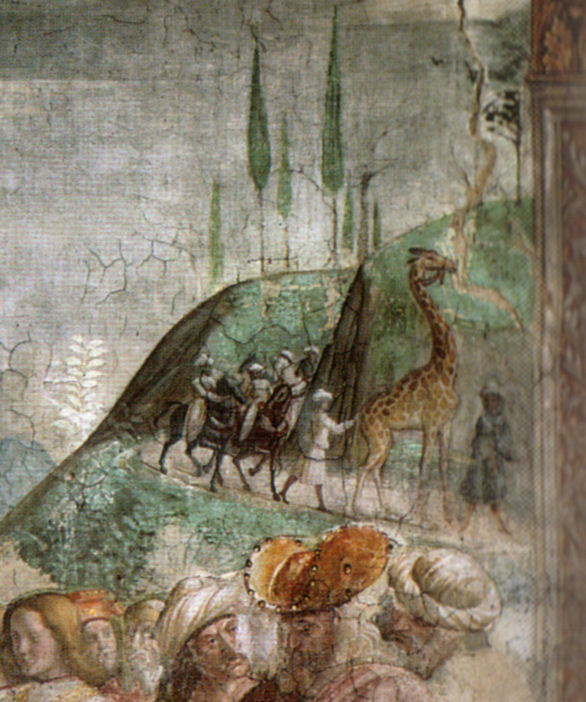
Giraffe depicted in a detail of Ghirlandaio's fresco Adoration of the Magi (c. 1485-1490) in the Tornabuoni Chapel in Florence.

The Medici giraffe did not survive for long, dying in January 1488; another giraffe was not seen in Europe for almost 300 years.

== Background ==
=== Cosimo's wooden giraffe ===
When Lorenzo's grandfather Cosimo de' Medici received Pope Pius II and Galeazzo Maria Sforza in April 1459, he assembled animal combat spectacles, including "a wild boar, two horses, four bulls, two young buffalo, some goats, a cow, and a calf" plus "twenty-six lions". The lions were borrowed from the city of Florence while Cosimo was responsible for other expenses. However, the lions had been fed too well, got bored and lost interest in the other animals. Lions, which were fierce and proud symbols of Florence, were unwilling to demonstrate their power, placing Cosimo's stature at risk.

In an attempt to spur the lions into action, Cosimo sent a "Trojan giraffe", a wooden giraffe containing armed warriors inside, to excite the lions and save his reputation. However, the lions remained bored.

Witnessing his grandfather's catastrophic spectacle, Lorenzo realized that he would not achieve absolute respect from his peers with money alone, and that he needed real political power at home and abroad.

=== Caesar's giraffe ===
In 46 BC, Caesar had staged a series of spectacular triumphs to celebrate his accomplishments in defeating Pompey, conquering Asia Minor and Egypt, and asserting his power back in Rome. A parade of lions, leopards, black panthers, baboons, green monkeys, Egyptian saluki dogs, parrots, flamingos, and ostriches marched through the streets. Among those animals was a unique creature – a giraffe that the Romans called the "cameleopard", as its characteristics seemed to be a combination of camel and leopard. Caesar's giraffe, which was promptly killed by lions, was the first to be brought to Europe. Although Lorenzo and Caesar had much in common—attaining success despite internal and external enemies, winning respect despite being accused of violating republican principles and becoming tyrants, and being an object of assassination conspiracies—he did not intend to emulate Caesar.

It is unclear when Lorenzo first thought of obtaining a giraffe. He might have been greatly interested in Caesar's triumphs and his giraffe due to owning Dio Cassius's Roman History and Pliny the Elder's Natural History in his library, both of which described Caesar's animal parade. Lorenzo saw the giraffe as part of "his multilayered strategy of social ascent" while putting more focus and effort into art collections, and believed a live giraffe would enhance his reputation.

== Historical context and diplomacy ==
=== Historical context ===
In 1422, the Florentine government had concluded a commercial treaty with the Mamluks sultan of Egypt and Syria, initiating a marine line for goods transportation to and from the East; however, no significant achievements emerged from these efforts. In the mid-1480s, after the post-Pazzi conspiracy wars, the Florentines decided to try again to help develop the state. The Florentines preferred trading directly with Egypt instead of working through intermediaries like the Venetians. To create new trading relations between Florence and Egypt, Paolo da Colle, a Florentine ambassador, went to the court of Mamluk Sultan Qaitbay in Cairo in 1485. It is believed that, while there, da Colle found what Lorenzo was longing for: a giraffe.

During this time, the Ottoman sultan Bayezid II threatened the Mamluk territories. Bayezid's political problem, a dynastic struggle between Bayezid and his half brother Cem, kept him from waging war on Egypt. If he returned to Egypt, Cem could have been a deterrent to Bayezid's aggression or could have even overthrown his brother with Qaitbay's aid.

Cem moved to Europe and was held captive in France. Pope Innocent VIII intended to take custody of him, which was in the pope's interest since Bayezid had threatened to invade Europe. This could also assist Qaitbay's strategy, as Cem leading Christian armies against Bayezid would keep Beayezid from attacking Egypt, which was only possible if the French agreed to give up Cem. In return, the Medici would acquire a long-standing friendship with the French whilst forging a familial relationship with Pope Innocent VIII. Thus, Lorenzo could help resolve Qaitbay's dilemma, and Paolo da Colle was in an ideal position to negotiate with Egypt's sultan.

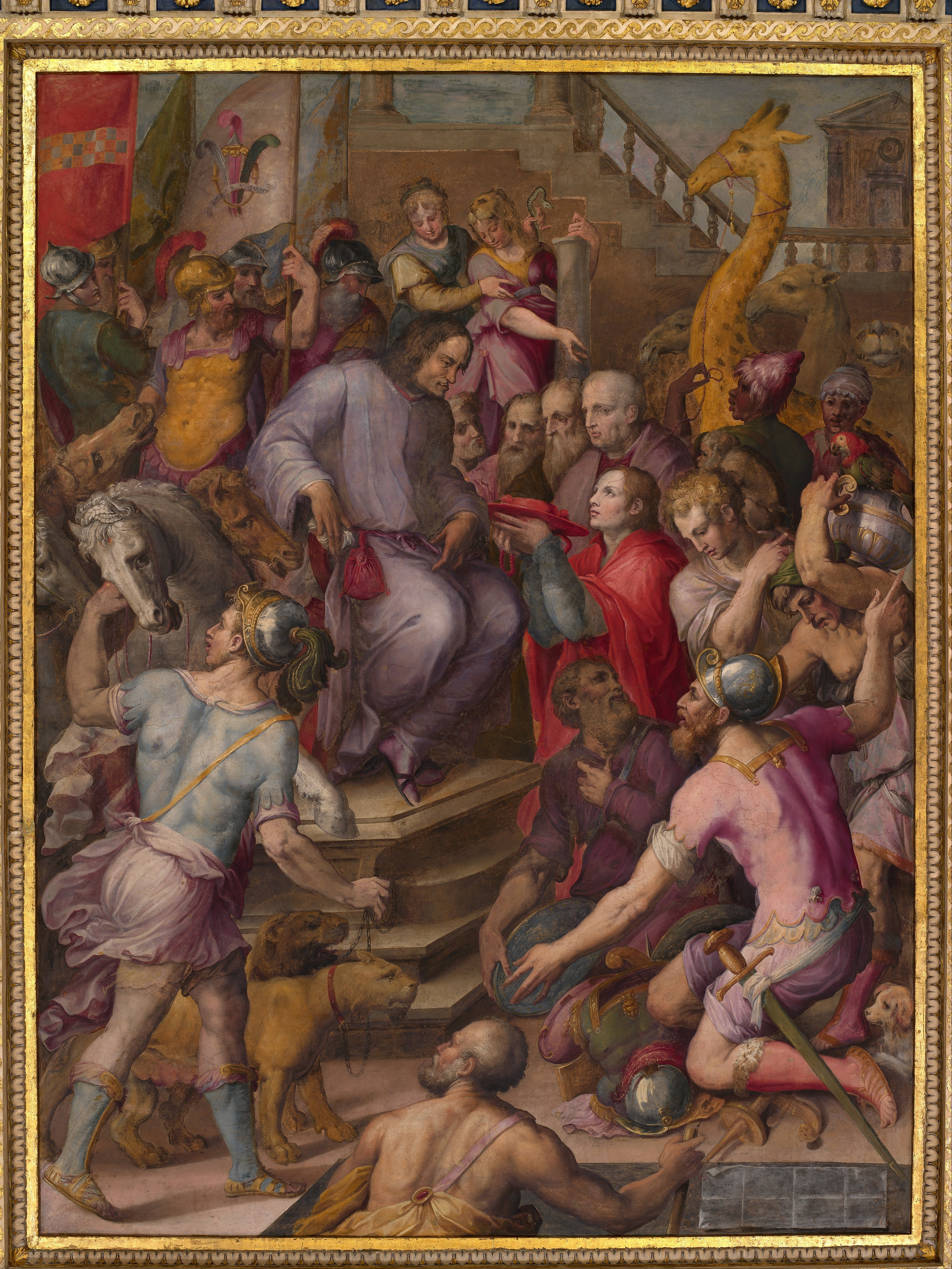
Lorenzo the Magnificent receives the tribute of the ambassadors, fresco by Giorgio Vasari and Marco da Faenza in Palazzo Vecchio, (1556–58). Lorenzo de Medici in a light blue gown receives homages from ambassadors of different kingdoms of Italy. Among those are believed to be envoys from Cairo, Egypt. Lorenzo's young son, Giovanni, kneels in front of him in the crimson cardinal's robe. The Medici giraffe is visible in the top right corner.

=== Diplomatic use ===
Given the intense relations between Egypt and the Ottoman Empire, it is unclear why Qaitbay stole presents that an ambassador from India had brought to Bayezid in 1485. Inevitably, Bayezid was "on the warpath against him". Qaitbay wrote to France, where Cem was kept, discussing Cem's transfer to Egypt. After asking for Lorenzo's diplomatic assistance, Qaitbay and Lorenzo agreed: "a giraffe for an Ottoman prince", which also facilitated securing Lorenzo's prestige. This giraffe represented Qaitbay's efforts "to establish good diplomatic relations with the Florentines in order to make them intervene on their behalf in the inter-Muslim conflict."

Lorenzo then offered Anne of France to forward a giraffe to her in exchange for her aid. The giraffe would help amplify "Lorenzo's stature as a prince wielding international authority" if he could use it as a diplomatic tool with France. This giraffe also served as a negotiating instrument with his Italian allies, the Ferdinand I of Naples and the Duke of Milan. They were hesitant to strike a mutual assistance agreement with Lorenzo. Another advantage of keeping this giraffe was enhancing Lorenzo's persuasive negotiation with the Pope for a promotion to cardinal for his son, Giovanni de' Medici.

On November 11, 1487, the giraffe arrived in Florence with other exotic animals, and seven days later it was officially presented to Lorenzo.

Another issue that Qaitbay wanted Lorenzo to settle in June 1488 was the Pope's permission to buy weapons. The Venetians ignored the arms sales ban issued by the Pope and kept selling arms to the Ottomans while deleting such traces in their records, leading to Qaitbay's request to Lorenzo to negotiate with the Pope. The weapons were permitted for purchase with papal authorization on January 17, 1489. Regarding Cem's custody, he was brought from France to Rome in March 1489. Cem died in February 1495 in Capua, where he had accompanied King Charles VIII of France, Anne's brother, to march south.

Lorenzo enjoyed the fruits of his giraffe diplomacy. His daughter Maddalena married Franceschetto Cibo, the illegitimate son of Pope Innocent VIII, in January 1488. In March 1489, his thirteen-year-old son, Giovanni, was made a cardinal; he would go on to become Pope Leo X. Anne of France would never receive her giraffe. Still, the giraffe was one of Lorenzo's political tools that leveraged his prestige due to its contribution to his influence with the Pope.

== Life and death ==
The contemporary poet Antonio Costanzo is said to have written about the giraffe:

I have also seen it raise its head to those onlookers offering to it from their windows, because its head reaches as high as eleven feet, thus seeing it from afar the people think that they are looking at a tower rather than an animal. Ours appears to like the crowd, it is always peaceable and without fear, it even seems to watch with pleasure the people who come to look at it.

The giraffe died in January 1488 after her head got stuck in the rafters of the barn she was held in. Panicked, she broke her neck when jerking her head too hard and died.

== Other giraffes ==
It was reported that "giraffes were also kept at other Italian courts; for instance, by Alphonso II, Duke of Calabria, in his villa Poggio Reale, and by Duke Hercules I in the Barco Park at Ferrara". If they existed, they certainly were not as famous as Lorenzo's giraffe, which was immortalized in paintings and frescos by Botticini, Vasari, Ghirlandaio, and Bacchiacca.

In East Asia, a giraffe had been brought to Beijing in 1414 from Bengal as a tributary gift. The second giraffe was later dispatched directly from the city of Melinda in 1421 to the Chinese emperor with much celebration and fanfare.

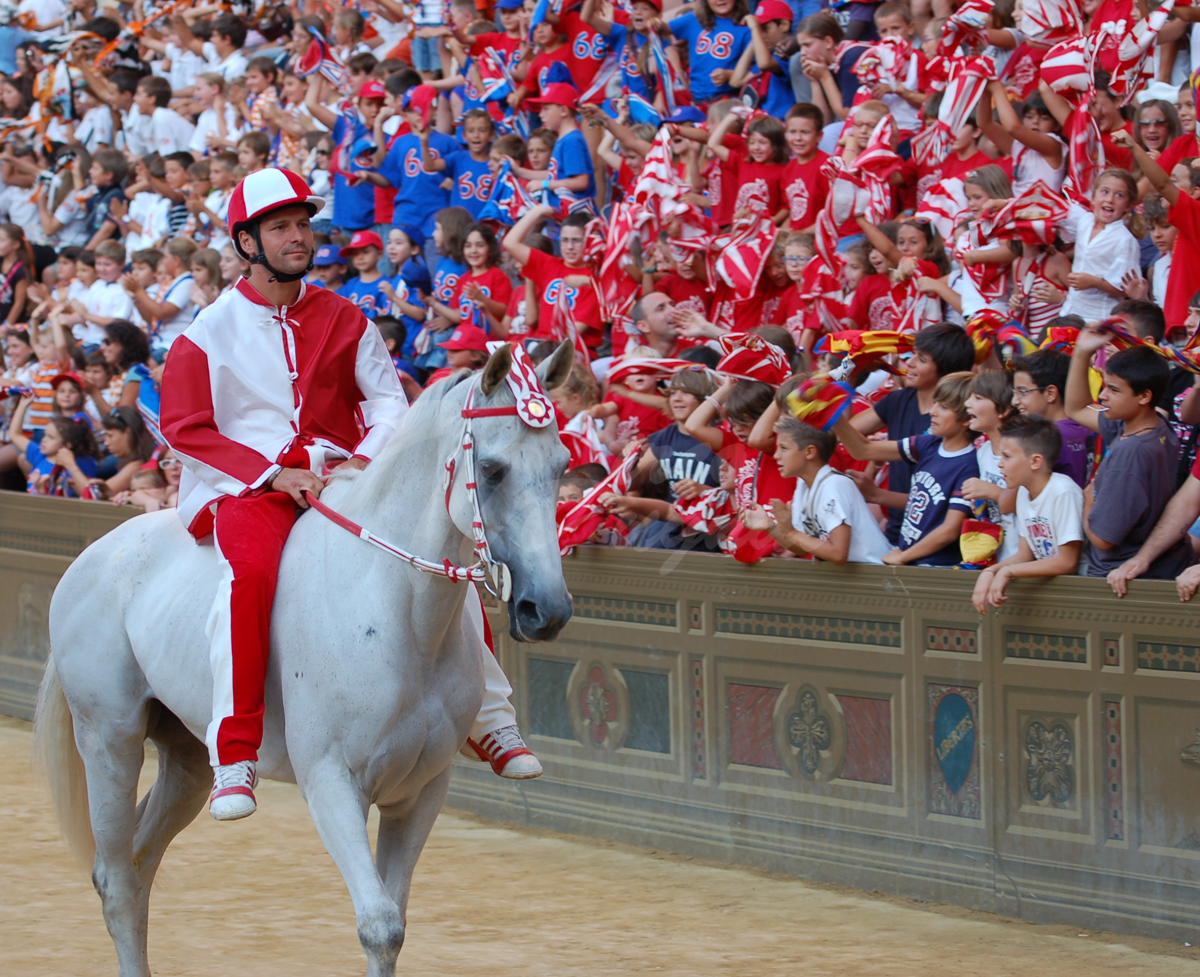
Jockey of the Contrada della Giraffa at the Palio di Siena.

A living giraffe was not seen in Europe again until Muhammad Ali Pasha sent three Nubian giraffes as gifts in the 1820s: one to Charles X of France in 1826, one to George IV of the United Kingdom in 1827, and one to Francis II of the Holy Roman Empire. Each caused a stir in Paris, London, and Vienna respectively. Two of them died within two years, but the Parisian giraffe, the female known today as Zarafa, survived for about 18 years and was later put in the Jardin des Plantes.

To this day, one of the seventeen urban wards of the nearby city of Siena is named after the giraffe (the Imperiale Contrada della Giraffa), and she is commemorated on its riding team and their racing silks in the Palio di Siena.

== Gallery ==
=== Frescos and paintings ===
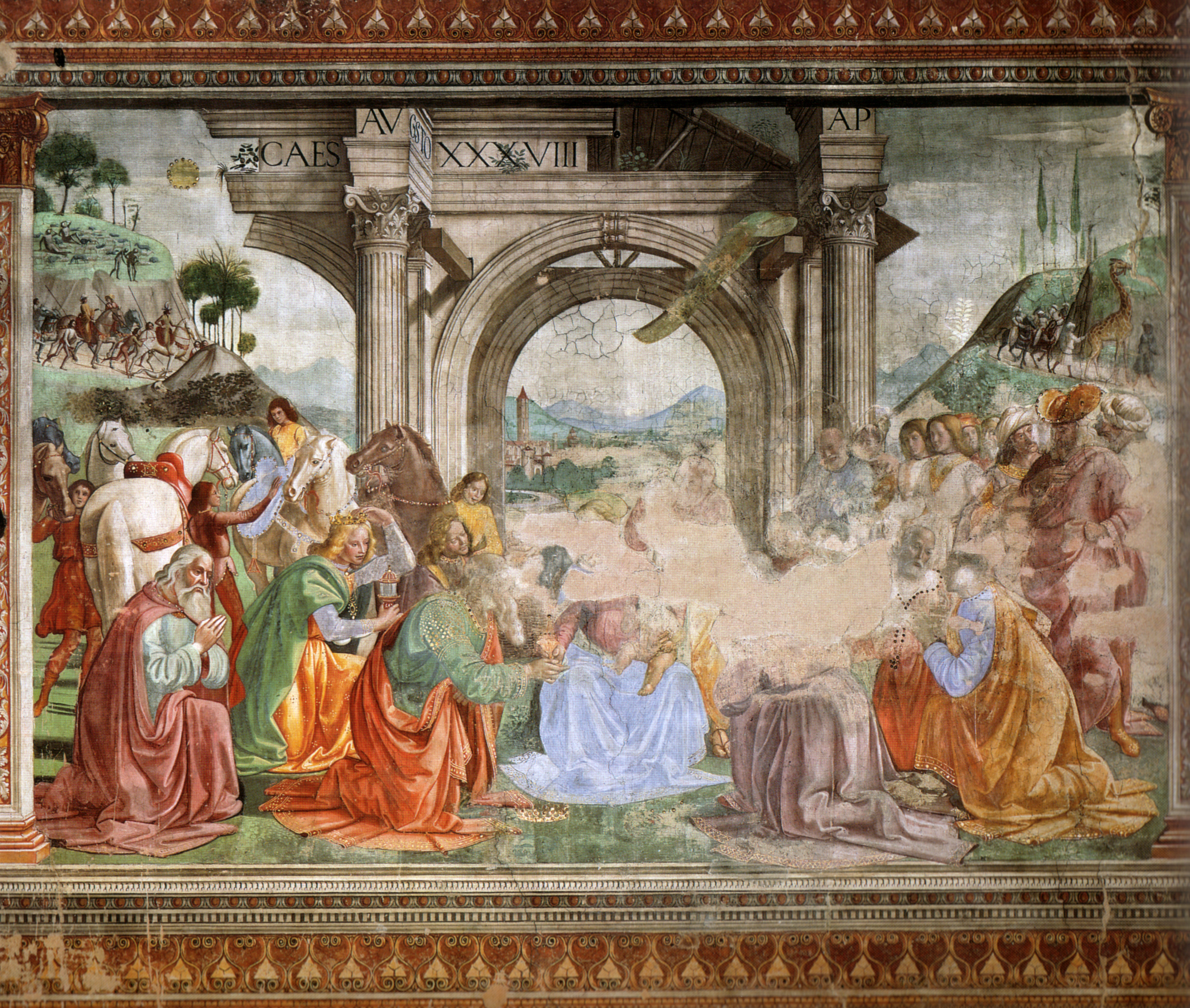
The Adoration of the Magi by Domenico Ghirlandaio, part of the frescoes on the left wall of Tornabuoni Chapel, was painted just after the arrival of the Medici giraffe (1486–90)

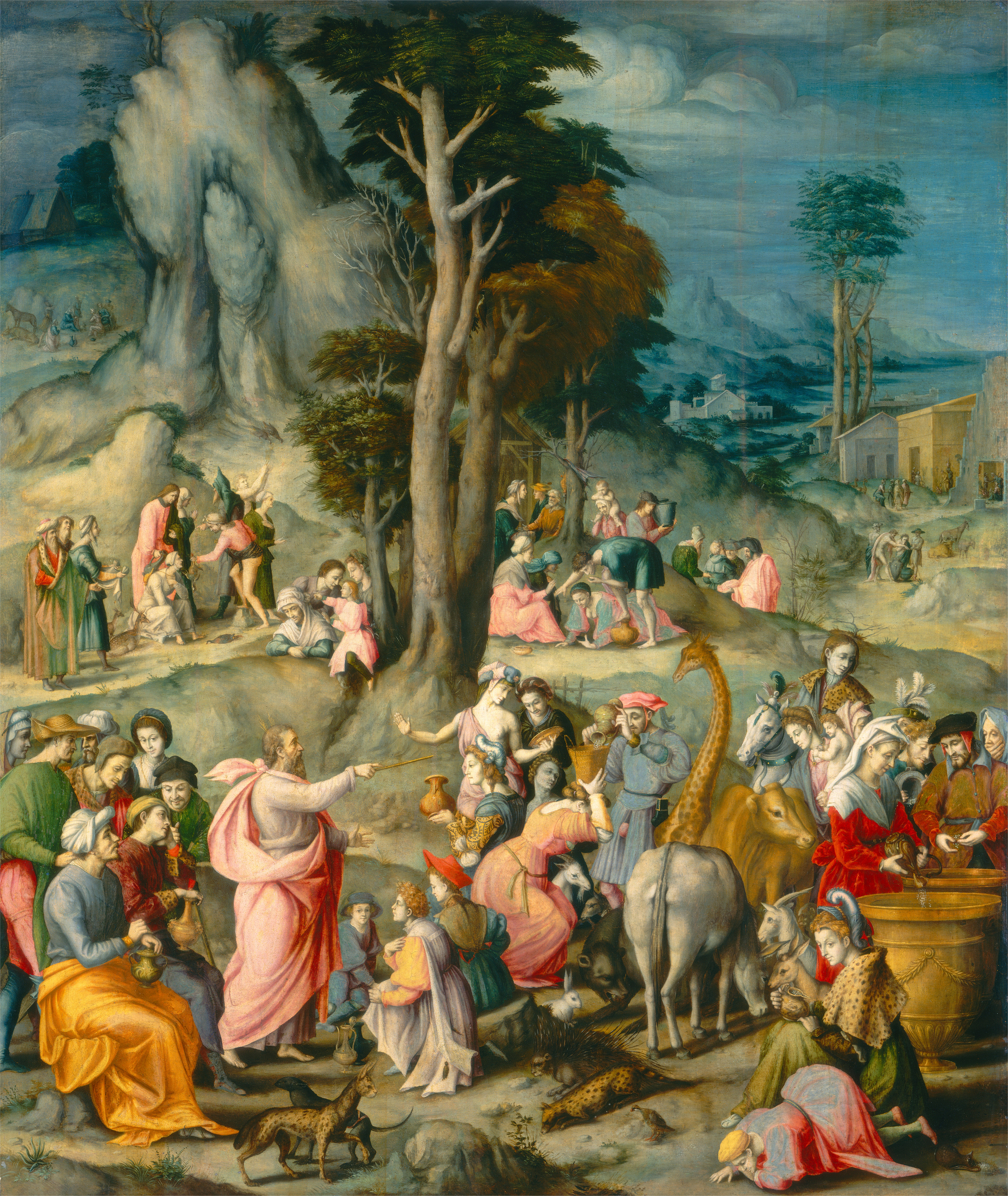
The Gathering of Manna by Francesco Bacchiacca (1540–55)

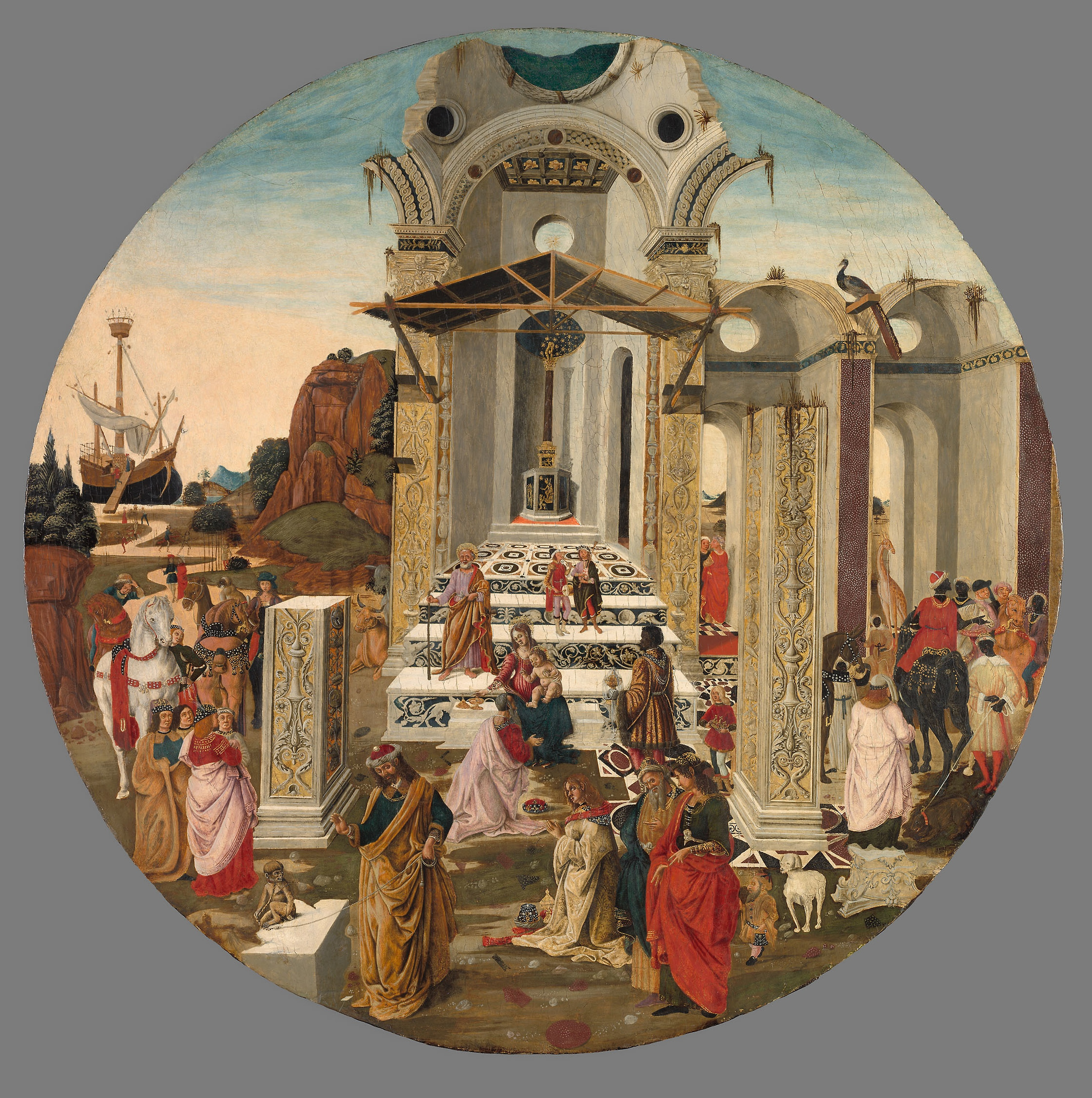
The Adoration of the Magi by Raffaello Botticini (c. 1495)

=== Details ===
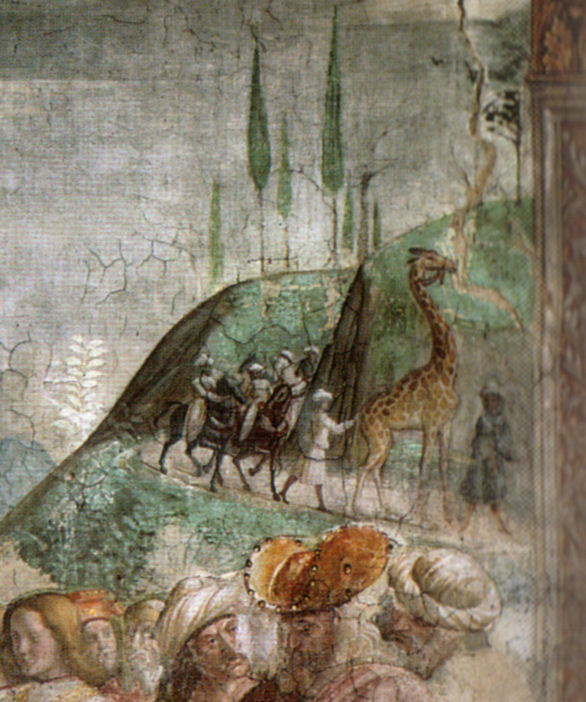
Detail of The Adoration of the Magi shows the giraffe descending a hill on the right-hand side

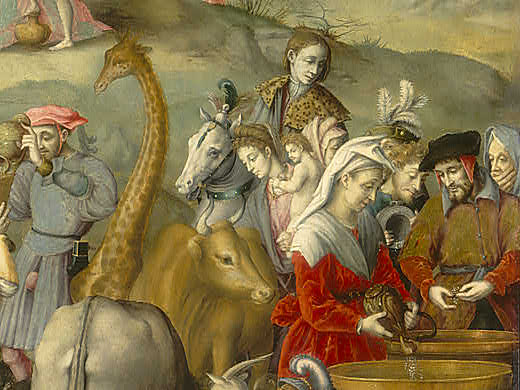
Detail of The Gathering of Manna. The artist's accurate depiction owes a debt to the Medici giraffe.

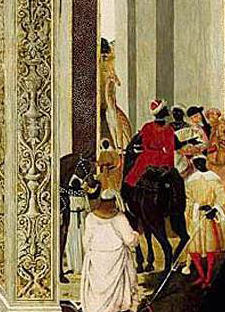
Detail of The Adoration of the Magi shows a small giraffe on the right side

== See also ==
- Zarafa

== Bibliography ==
- Belozerskaya, Marina (2009). The Medici giraffe: and other tales of exotic animals and power. New York: Little, Brown and Co. pp. 87–129. ISBN 978-0-316-07642-5. OCLC 461332997.
- Fisher, Sydney Nettleton (1948). The Foreign Relations Of Turkey, 1481–1512.
- Hattox, Ralph S. (2002). "Qaytbay's Diplomatic Dilemma: Concerning the Flight of Cem Sultan (1481–82)". Mamlūk Studies Review. The Middle East Documentation Center (MEDOC). doi:10.6082/M1ZK5DT0. ISSN 1947-2404. Archived from the original on June 13, 2022.
- Joost-Gaugier, Christiane L. (1987). "Lorenzo the Magnificent and the Giraffe as a Symbol of Power". Artibus et Historiae. 8 (16): 91–99. doi:10.2307/1483302. ISSN 0391-9064. JSTOR 1483302.
- Landucci, Luca (1927). A Florentine diary from 1450 to 1516. London : New York: J.M. Dent & Sons, Dutton.
- Laufer, Berthold (1928). "The Giraffe in History and Art". Anthropology Leaflet (27): 1–100. ISSN 2167-6208. JSTOR 41444127.
- Ringmar, Erik (2006). "Audience for a Giraffe: European Expansionism and the Quest for the Exotic". Journal of World History. 17 (4): 375–397. doi:10.1353/jwh.2006.0060. ISSN 1527-8050. S2CID 143808549. Archived from the original on March 7, 2022.
- Ross, Janet (1910). Lives of the early Medici as told in their correspondence. London : Chatto.
- Wansbrough, John (1965). "Venice and Florence in the Mamluk Commercial Privileges". Bulletin of the School of Oriental and African Studies, University of London. 28 (3): 483–523. doi:10.1017/S0041977X00071421. ISSN 0041-977X. JSTOR 612096. S2CID 162824290.
