= Nicolas Huet =

Nicolas Huet may refer to

- Nicolas Huet (snowboarder)
- Nicolas Huet the Younger (1770–1830), French natural history illustrator
