= Zarafa (giraffe) =

First giraffe in France

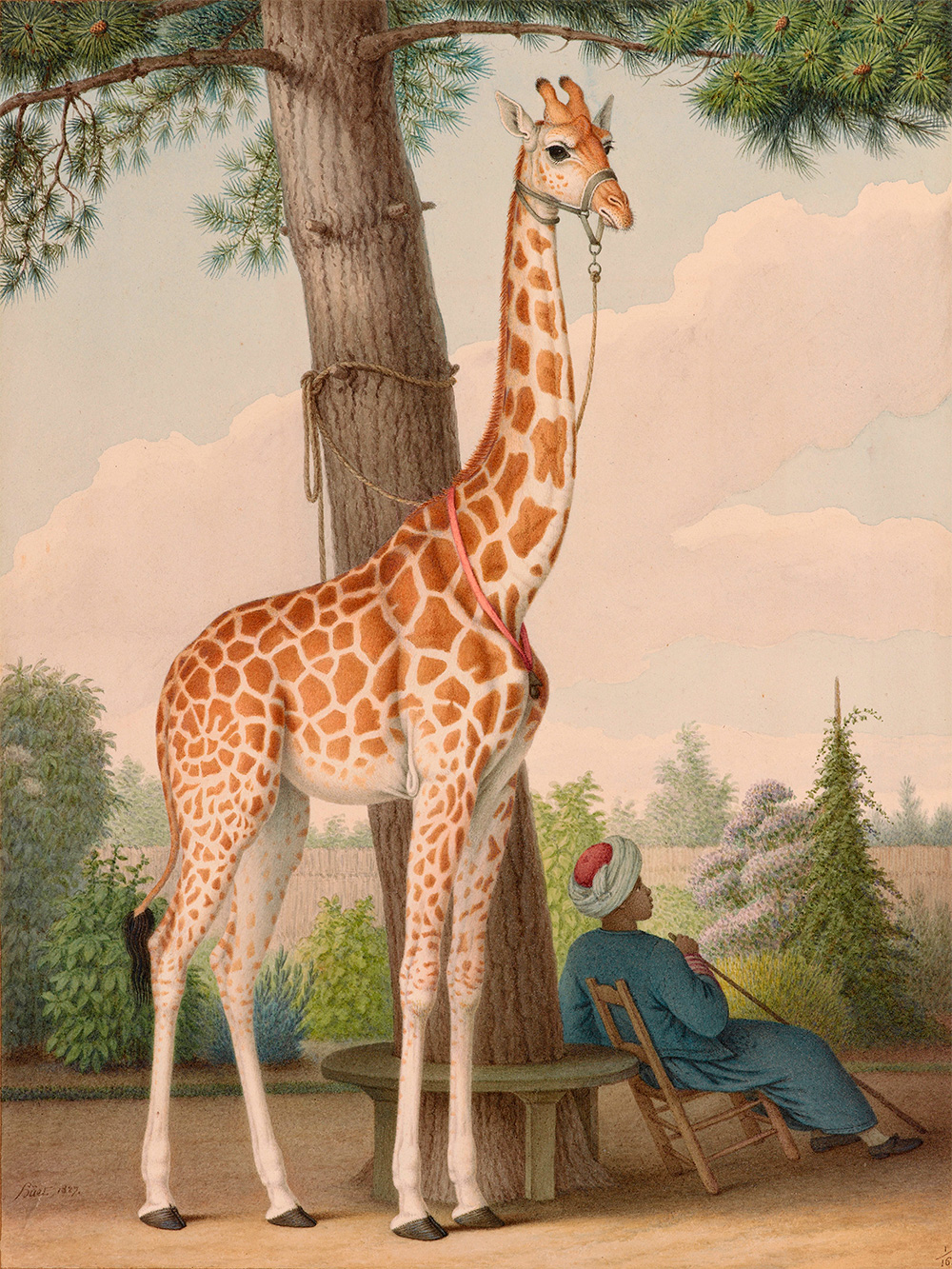
Study of the Giraffe Given to Charles X by the Viceroy of Egypt (1827) by Nicolas Huet II, also showing the groom, Atir, who would look after her for eighteen years

Zarafa (January 1824 (Note: « On a varié sur son âge compté en nombre de lunes; cependant on est parvenu à concilier quelques renseignemens contradictoires et à établir qu'elle avait pris vingt-deux mois en novembre 1826 » (Various accounts on her age, expressed in lunar months, have been given; however we managed to conciliate contradictory information and to establish that she was 22 months old in November 1826), Étienne Geoffroy Saint-Hilaire) – 12 January 1845) was a female Nubian giraffe who lived in the Jardin des Plantes in Paris for 18 years. A gift from Muhammad Ali of Egypt to King Charles X of France, she was one of three giraffes Muhammad Ali sent to European rulers in 1827. These were the first giraffes to be seen in Europe for over three centuries, since the Medici giraffe was sent to Lorenzo de' Medici in Florence in 1486. She didn't receive the name "Zarafa" until 1985.

== Background ==
The giraffe known today as Zarafa was one among a series of diplomatic gifts (Note: Including an obelisk, later exchanged with the Luxor Obelisk) exchanged between Charles X of France and the Ottoman Viceroy of Egypt, Mehmet Ali Pasha, to enhance their relationship. A prime mover behind this exchange was Bernardino Drovetti, the French consul-general in Egypt.

== Biography ==
The young Nubian giraffe was captured by Arab hunters near Sennar in Sudan and first taken by camel, then sailed by felucca on the Blue Nile to Khartoum. From there she was transported down the Nile on a specially constructed barge to Alexandria. She was accompanied by three cows that provided her with 25 litres of milk each day.

From Alexandria, she embarked on a ship to Marseille, with an Arab groom, Hassan, and Drovetti's Sudanese servant, Atir. Because of her height, a hole was cut through the deck above the cargo hold through which she could poke her neck. After a voyage of 32 days, she arrived in Marseille on 31 October 1826. Fearing the dangers of transporting her by boat to Paris around the Iberian Peninsula and up the Atlantic coast of France to the Seine, it was decided that she should walk the 900 km to Paris.

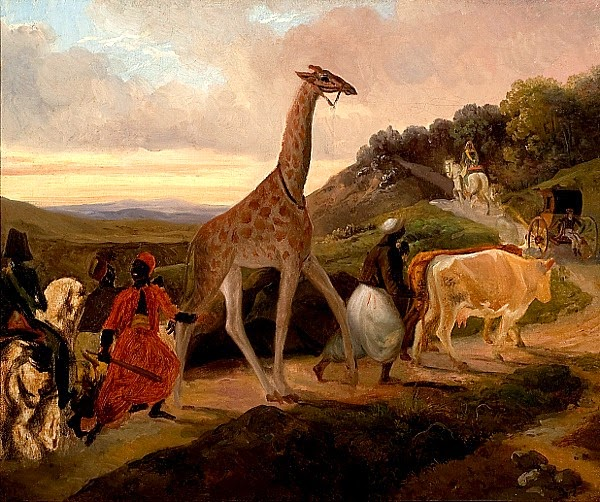
The Passage of the giraffe near Arnay-le-Duc (1827) by Jacques Raymond Brascassat, showing Zarafa with entourage en route to Paris

She over-wintered in Marseille, where she was joined by the naturalist Étienne Geoffroy Saint-Hilaire for the walk. He ordered a two-part yellow coat to keep her warm, and shoes for her feet. She set out on 20 May 1827, already 15 cm taller than when she arrived in Marseille. She was accompanied by her cows and Saint-Hilaire, then aged 55, who walked with her. The trip to Paris took 41 days. She was a spectacle in each town she passed through, Aix-en-Provence, Avignon, Orange, Montelimar and Vienne. She arrived in Lyon on 6 June, where she was greeted by an enthusiastic crowd of 30,000.

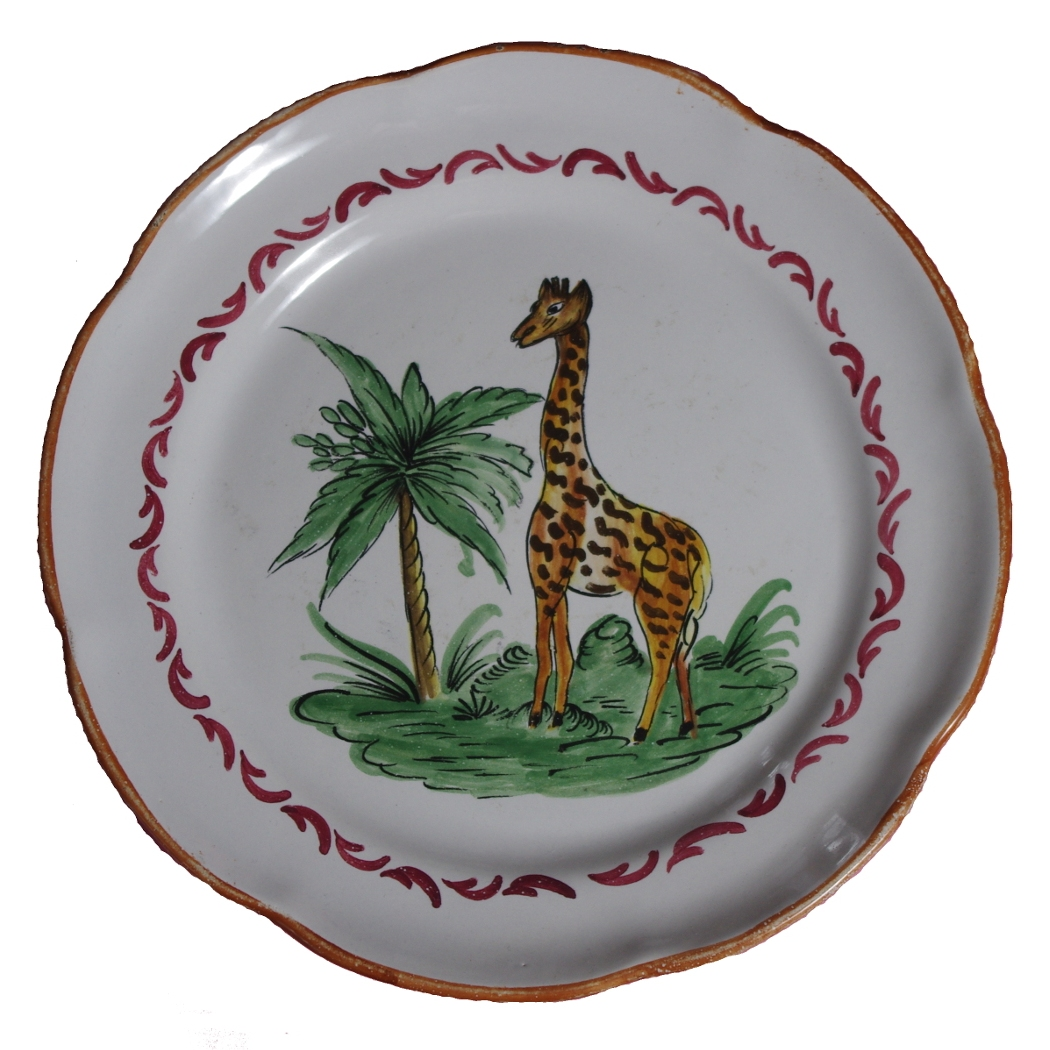
Commemorative faience plate

She was presented to the King at the chateau of Saint-Cloud in Paris on 9 July 1827, and took up residence in the Jardin des Plantes. Now standing nearly 4 m high, Zarafa's arrival in Paris caused a sensation. Over 100,000 people came to see her, approximately an eighth of the population of Paris at the time. Honoré de Balzac wrote a story about her; Gustave Flaubert (then a young child) travelled from Rouen to see her. La mode à la girafe swept the nation; hair was arranged in towering styles, spotted fabrics were all the rage. The Journal des Dames reported that the color known as "belly of giraffe" became extremely popular. Porcelain and other ceramics were painted with giraffe images. She was painted by Nicolas Huet, Jacques Raymond Brascassat and many others.

Zarafa remained in Paris for a further 18 years until her death, attended to the end by Atir. Her corpse was stuffed and displayed in the foyer of the Jardin des Plantes in Paris for many years, before being moved to the Museum of Natural History of La Rochelle, where it remains.

== Names ==
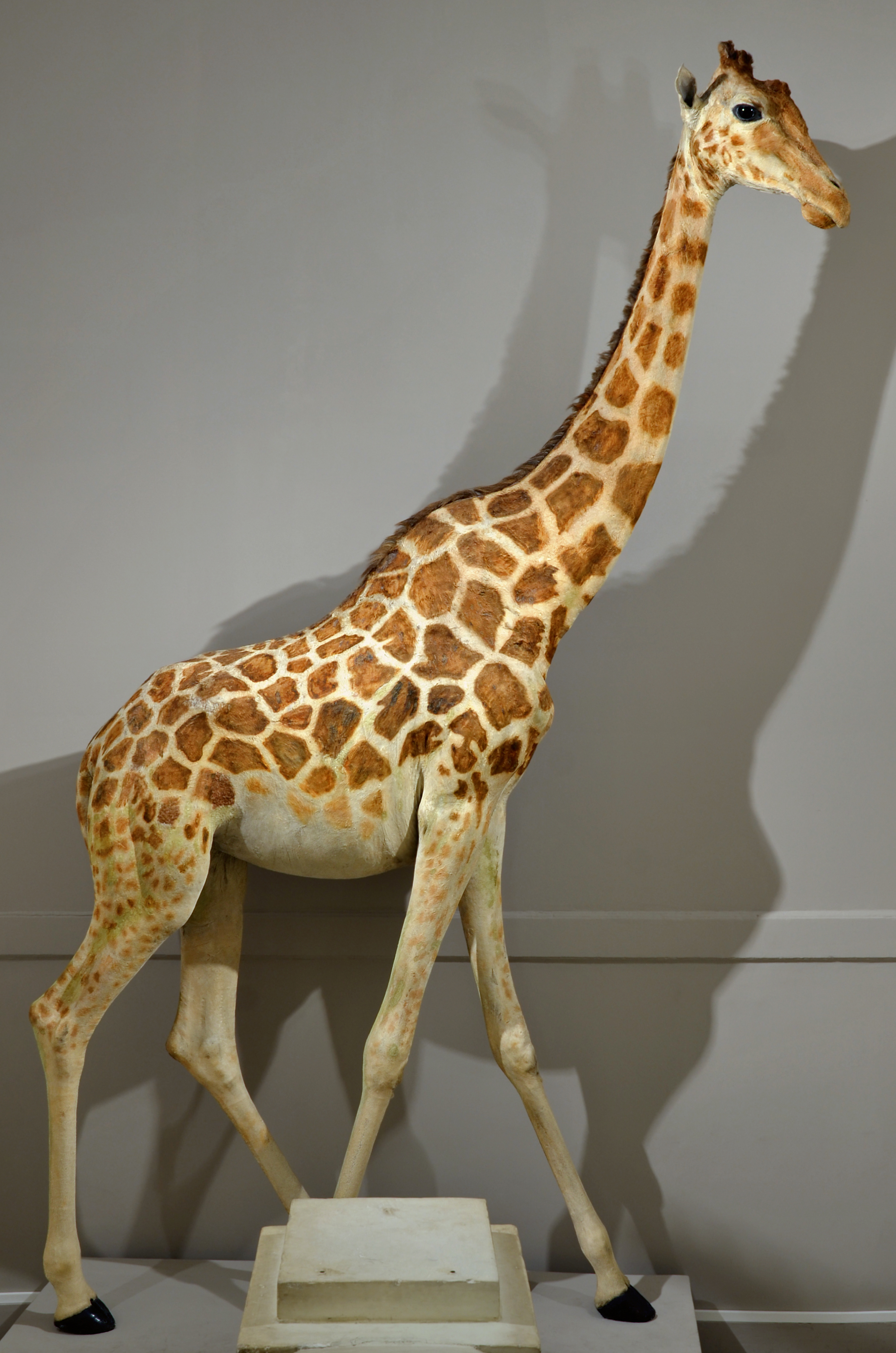
The stuffed giraffe known as Zarafa, in the Museum of Natural History of La Rochelle, France

According to Saint-Hilaire, she was called le bel animal du roi ("The Beautiful Animal of the King") during her trip from Marseille to Paris and she was dubbed la Belle Africaine ("the Beautiful African") by contemporary press. La Gazette referred to her as "her Highness" (pun intended). (Note: "Her Highness was to be presented to his Majesty! how little the king must have looked by a lady 14 feet high! What the ceremonial was I cannot say, but I really believe her Highness was guilty of lèse-majesté — the treason of looking down upon a king, the monarch of the great nation; but her Highness is unbendable by nature, and she has a quality very rare and estimable in the female sex, as all married men will allow; she is mute.")

The name "Zarafa" was given to her by American author Michael Allin in his 1998 book Zarafa: A Giraffe's True Story, from Deep in Africa to the Heart of Paris. Zarafa, meaning "charming" or "lovely one" in Arabic, is a phonetic variant of the Arabic word for giraffe: zerafa. (Note: See also Heather J. Sharkey "La Belle Africaine: The Sudanese Giraffe Who Went to France" Sharkey misreads Dardaud, who did not use the name "Zarafa" in his 1985 text.) (Note: Another Arabic homophonous word, means "charming" or "lovely one" was referenced by Allin as relating to the name, but it was later noted that both words are spelled with different Arabic letters.) Olivier Lebleu, author of the new preface to the second edition (2007) of the French journalist Gabriel Dardaud's book Une giraffe pour le roi (the first modern full-length work about France's first giraffe) has taken up the name "Zarafa," as have several other recent authors, including Lebleu himself in his 2006 book Les Avatars de Zarafa. In addition, the eponymous 2012 French animation film Zarafa uses the name; and even the museum in La Rochelle, where her mounted remains still greet visitors, now refers to her by the name Zarafa.

== Other giraffe gifts from Muhammad Ali ==
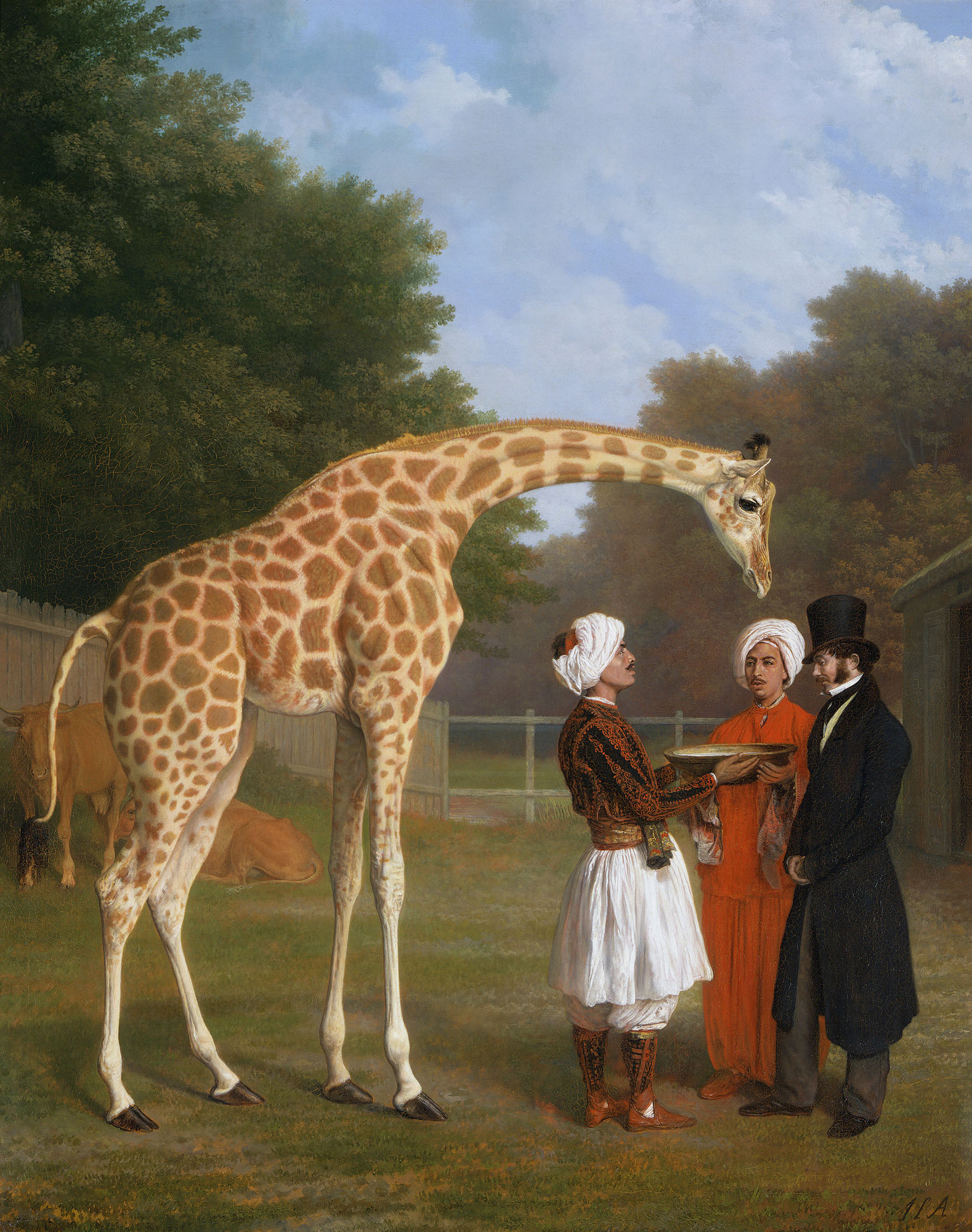
The Nubian Giraffe, by Jacques-Laurent Agasse (c.1827); this one of the three giraffes sent to Europe by Mehmet Ali Pasha was received by George IV in London. The man in the top hat is Edward Cross, Exeter Exchange menagerie proprietor, with the Egyptian attendants and (background) the Egyptian cows that supplied the young giraffe with milk

Muhammad Ali Pasha also sent two other giraffes as gifts in 1827, one to George IV of the United Kingdom in London and the other to Francis I of Austria in Vienna. Like the giraffe sent to France, both inspired giraffe crazes in their respective cities. The Austrian giraffe joined the Emperor's menagerie at Schönbrunn Palace but survived for less than one year. Nevertheless, it lived on in the form of Giraffeln pastries, served until the beginning of the First World War, and Giraffentorten (giraffe cakes) which still can be found. The English giraffe (or "cameleopard", echoing the terminology used by Pliny) joined the embryonic London Zoo in Regent's Park. It was painted as The Nubian Giraffe in 1827 by Jacques-Laurent Agasse, in an image that includes Edward Cross and, in the background, the giraffe's milk cows from Egypt. The English giraffe survived for less than two years, and was stuffed by John Gould. The deceased giraffe would eventually be replaced in 1836 by four additional specimens, which were caught in Sudan and transported to London by ship.

== In culture ==
- Zarafa, a 2012 French-Belgian animation film
- Puppet re-enactment:

From 15th April to 24th June 2023, British artist Sebastian Mayer re-enacted Zarafa's journey through France by walking from Marseille to Paris with a full scale giraffe puppet.
