= Muséum d'Histoire naturelle de La Rochelle =

Coordinates: 46.1648°N 1.1511°W

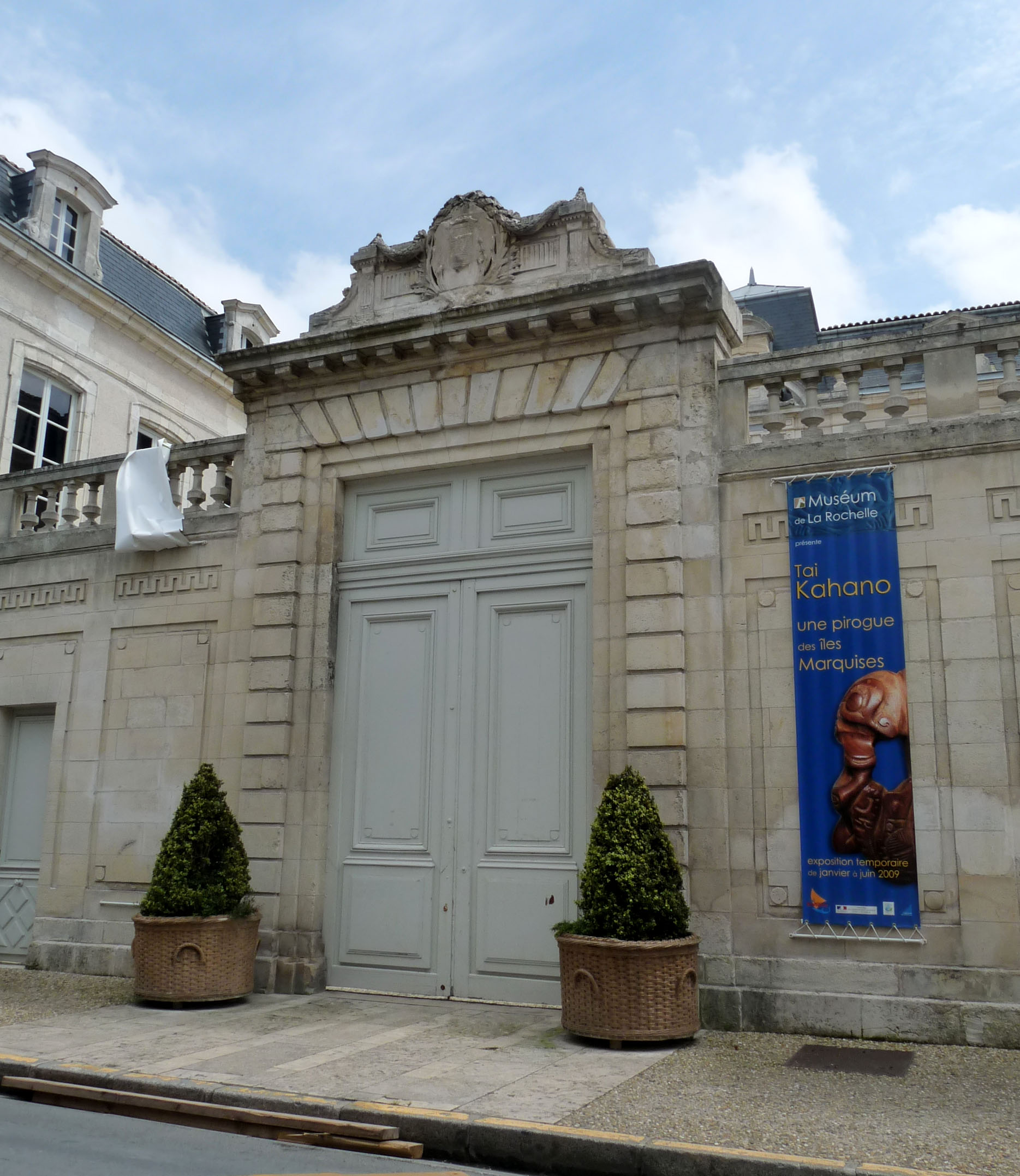
Entrance gate of the museum.

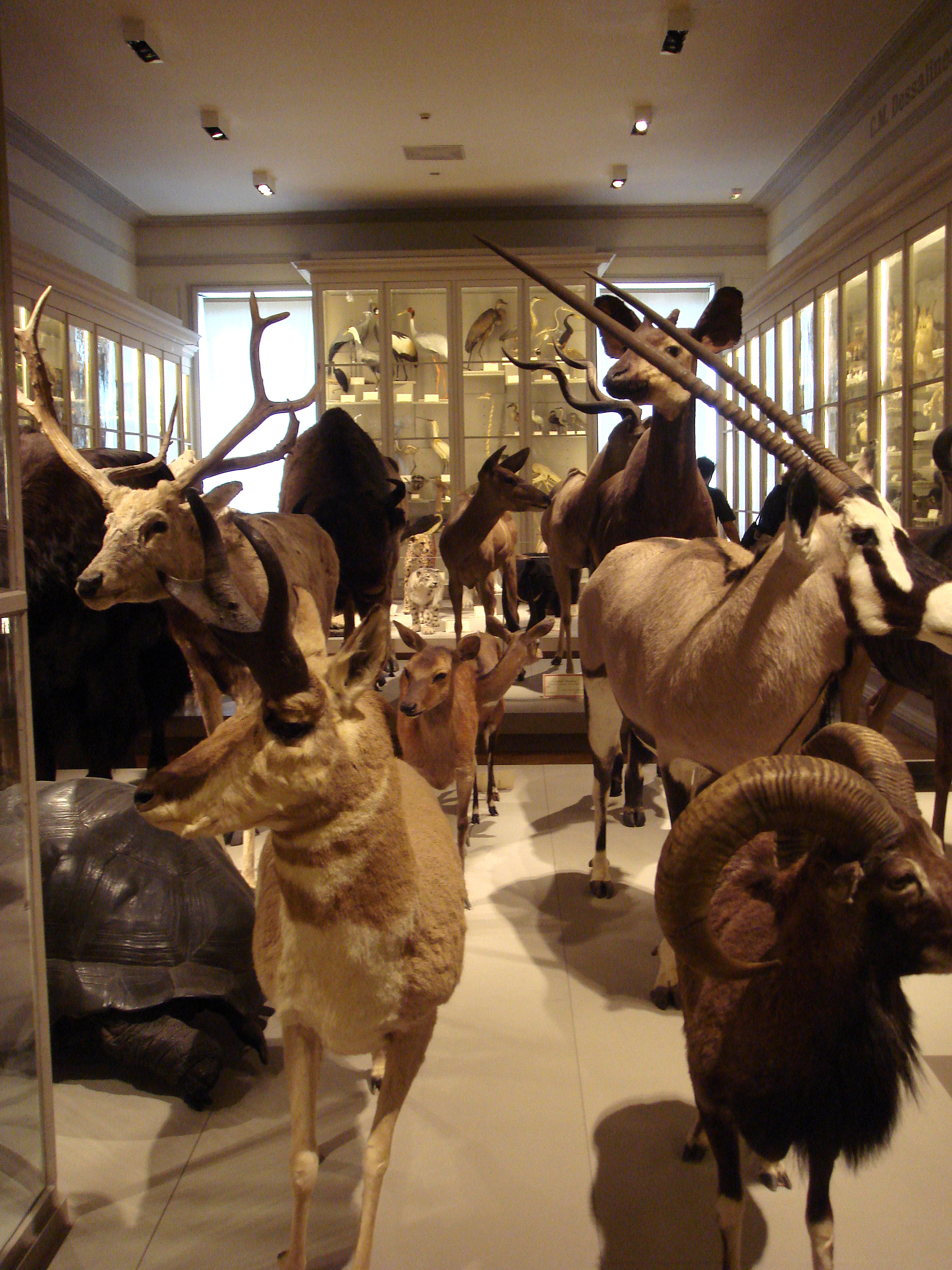
A room in the museum.

The Muséum d'histoire naturelle de La Rochelle is a natural history museum located in the city of La Rochelle, France. The building is listed as a historic monument by order of October 27, 2003. He is a member of the national network of naturalist collections.

The museum was reopened after a major renovation in 2007. It displays about 10,000 artifacts from naturalists and ethnographers since the 18th century.

== Gallery ==
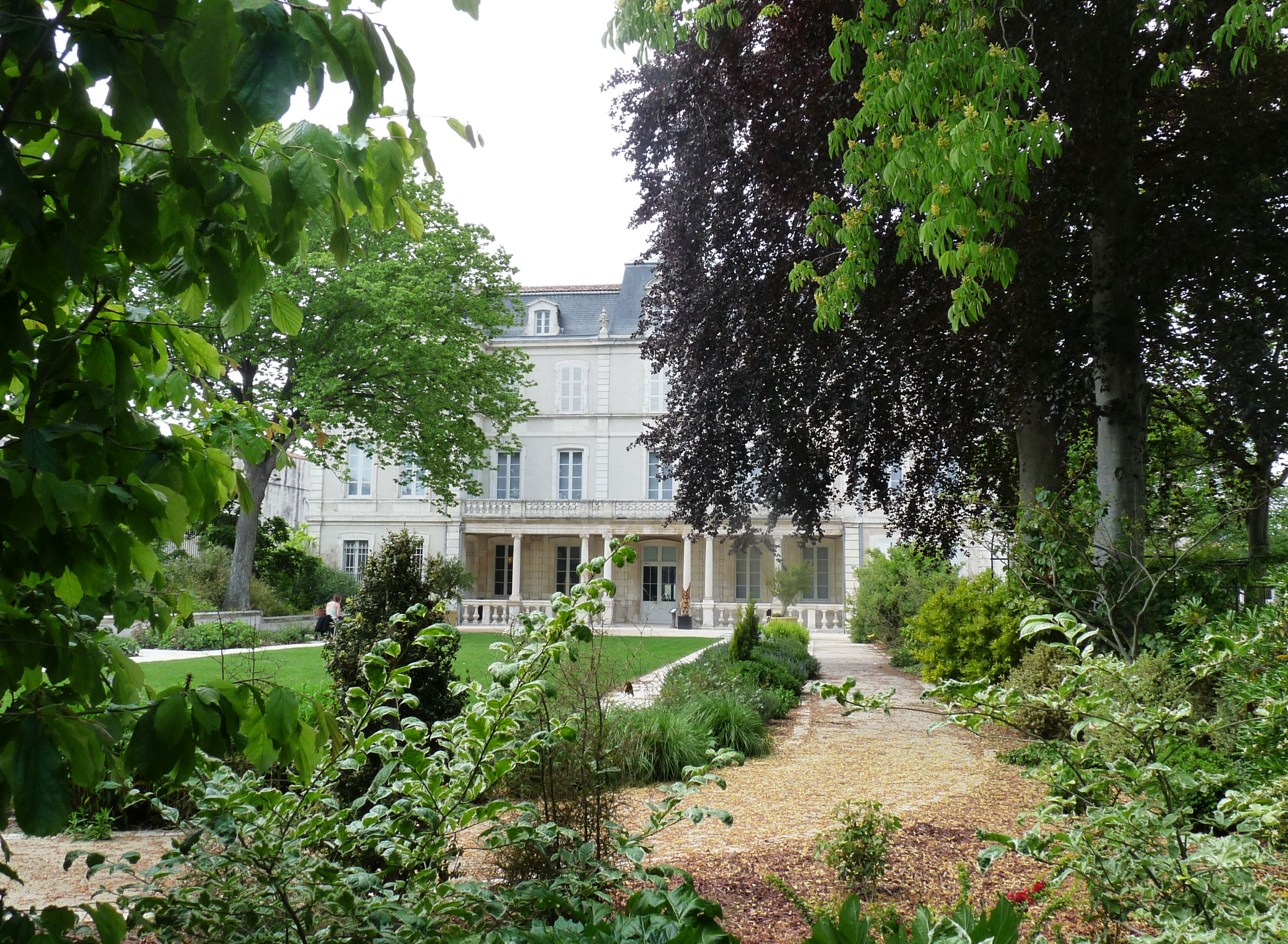
Gardens of the museum

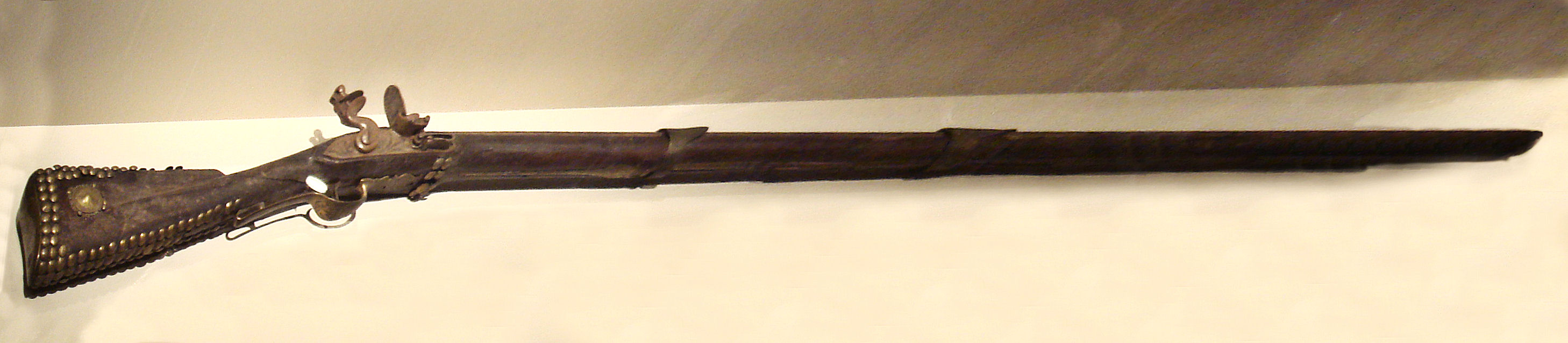
Malagasi gun seized by France in Madagascar in 1898.

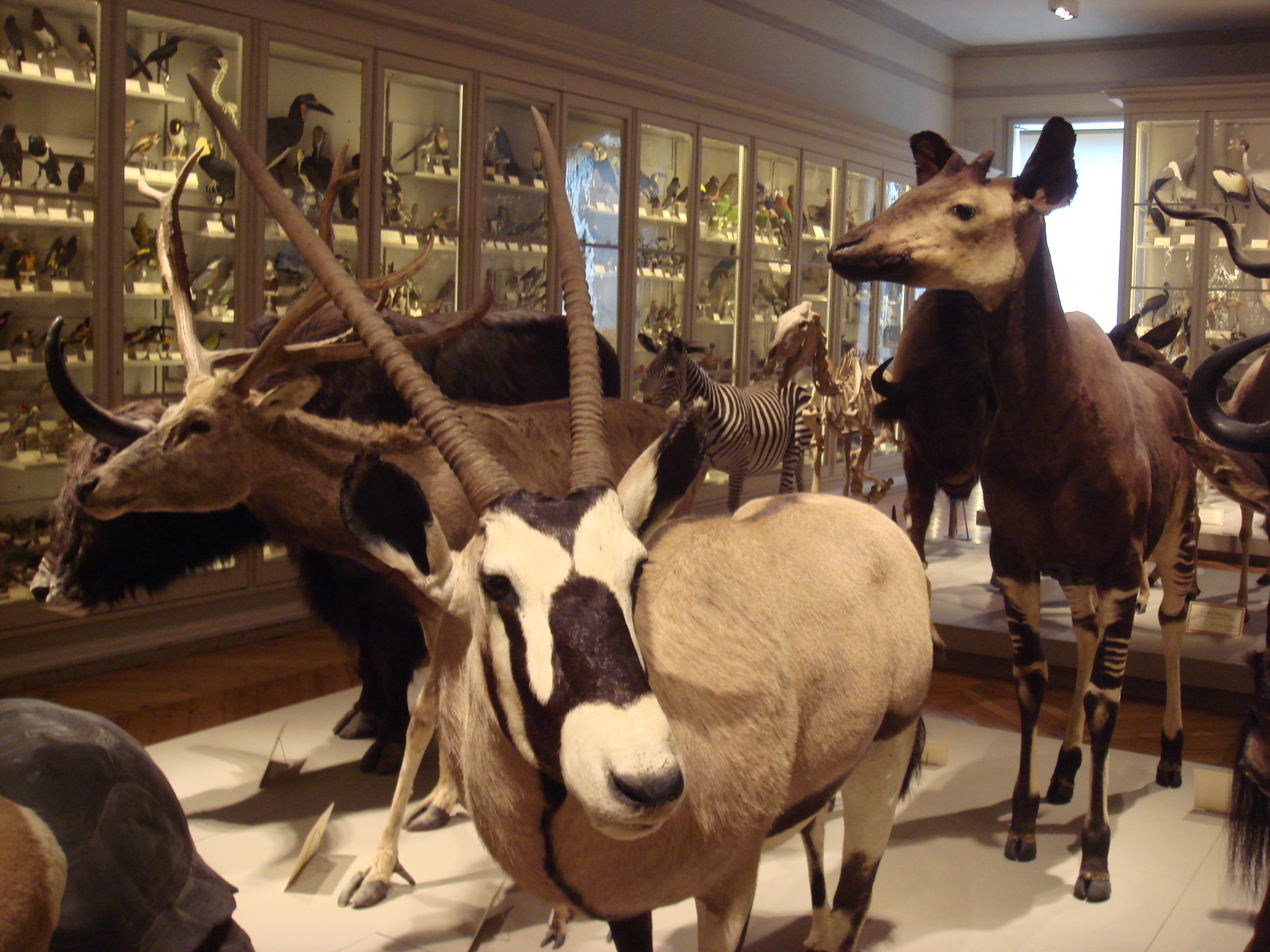
A room in the museum.

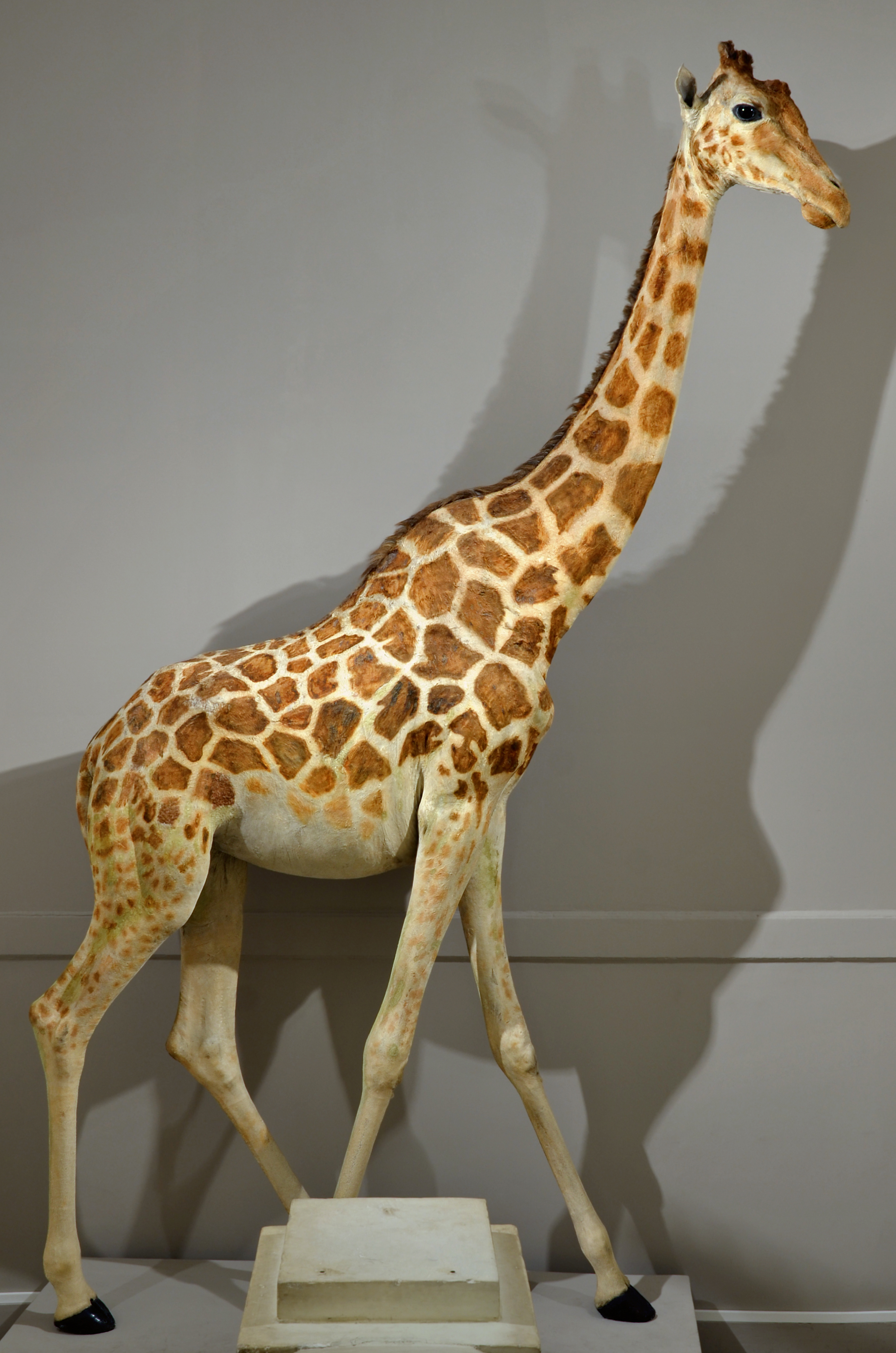
Zarafa, the famous giraffe that inspired La mode à la girafe craze in 1820s France
