= Jean-Christophe Leroux =

French-Canadian professor

Dr. Jean-Christophe Leroux (born April 27, 1969) is a French-Canadian professor of Drug Formulation and Delivery at the Institute of Pharmaceutical Sciences at the Swiss Federal Institute of Technology ETH Zürich. His research is mainly focused on broadening the field of drug delivery, and the development of biodetoxification systems for the treatment of metabolite disorders. Additionally, he has made important contributions to the field of biomaterials for use in drug delivery.

== Education ==
Leroux trained as a pharmacist at the University of Montreal (Canada), and received his Ph.D. in Pharmaceutical Sciences (1995) from the University of Geneva (Switzerland). From 1996 to 1997, he was a postdoctoral fellow at University of California, San Francisco.

== Career ==
Leroux was appointed professor at the University of Montreal in 1997 where he worked until he joined the ETH Zürich. From 2001 to 2010, he held the Tier 2 Canada research chair in drug delivery. He was the chair of the institute of Pharmaceutical Sciences at the ETH Zürich from 2014 to 2016, and from 2021 to 2023.

Leroux has made fundamental and applied contributions to the fields of colloids, biomaterials, and drug delivery. He has published over 270 peer-reviewed manuscripts in top-ranked scientific journals, 14 book chapters and is co-inventor on several patents. Jean-Christophe Leroux is one of the most cited scientists in pharmacy and pharmacology.

Leroux was the associate editor of the European Journal and Pharmaceutics and Biopharmaceutics from 2006 to 2012, and of the Journal of Controlled Release from 2012 to 2017.

In 2015, Leroux co-founded the ETH spin-off companies Versantis AG and Inositec AG that are developing drugs for the treatment of hyperammonemia and vascular calcification, respectively. Inositec AG was acquired by Vifor Pharma in Nov-2021 for the development of treatments against calcification disorders at all stages of chronic kidney disease. Versantis AG was acquired by Genfit in Sep-2022 including their team of experts to complements their research on highly unmet needs such as ACLF (acute-on-chronic liver failure).

== Awards and recognition ==
=== 2023 ===
- Bioconjugate Chemistry Lectureship Award

=== 2022 ===
- Maurice-Marie Janot Award - Association de Pharmacie Galénique Industrielle
- Samyang Award in honor of Sung Wan Kim- Controlled Release Society
- Fellow, National Academy of Pharmacy (France)

=== 2021 ===
- Highly Cited Researcher in Pharmacology and Toxicology-Web of Science
- Dandelion Entrepreneurship Award - ETH Zurich
- Grand Prix de l`Académie nationale de Pharmacie
- Centennial Innovation Award in Research and Development – University of Montreal

=== 2020 ===
- Elected to membership in the European Academy of Sciences
- ERC Advanced Grant

=== 2019 ===
- Fellow of the American Association of Pharmaceutical Scientists

=== 2018 ===
- Highly Cited Researcher 2018 - Clarivate Analytics

=== 2017 ===
- Highly Cited Researcher 2017 - Clarivate Analytics

=== 2016 ===
- Highly Cited Researcher 2016 - Thomson Reuters
- American Association of Pharmaceutical Scientists Lipid Based Drug Delivery Outstanding Research award

=== 2015 ===
- Phoenix Prize, Pharmaceutical Technology
- Highly Cited Researcher 2015 - Thomson Reuters

=== 2014 ===
- Fellow of the Controlled Release Society
- APV Research Award for Outstanding Achievements in Pharmaceutical Sciences
- Highly Cited Researcher 2014 - Thomson Reuters

=== 2010 ===
- Debiopharm Life Sciences Award

=== 2008 ===
- Steacie Fellowship

=== 2004 ===
- Controlled Release Society Young Investigator Award

=== 2003 ===
- Astra Zeneca – AFPC Young Investigator Award

=== 2002 ===
- Pfizer – Actualités Pharmaceutiques award (Research)
