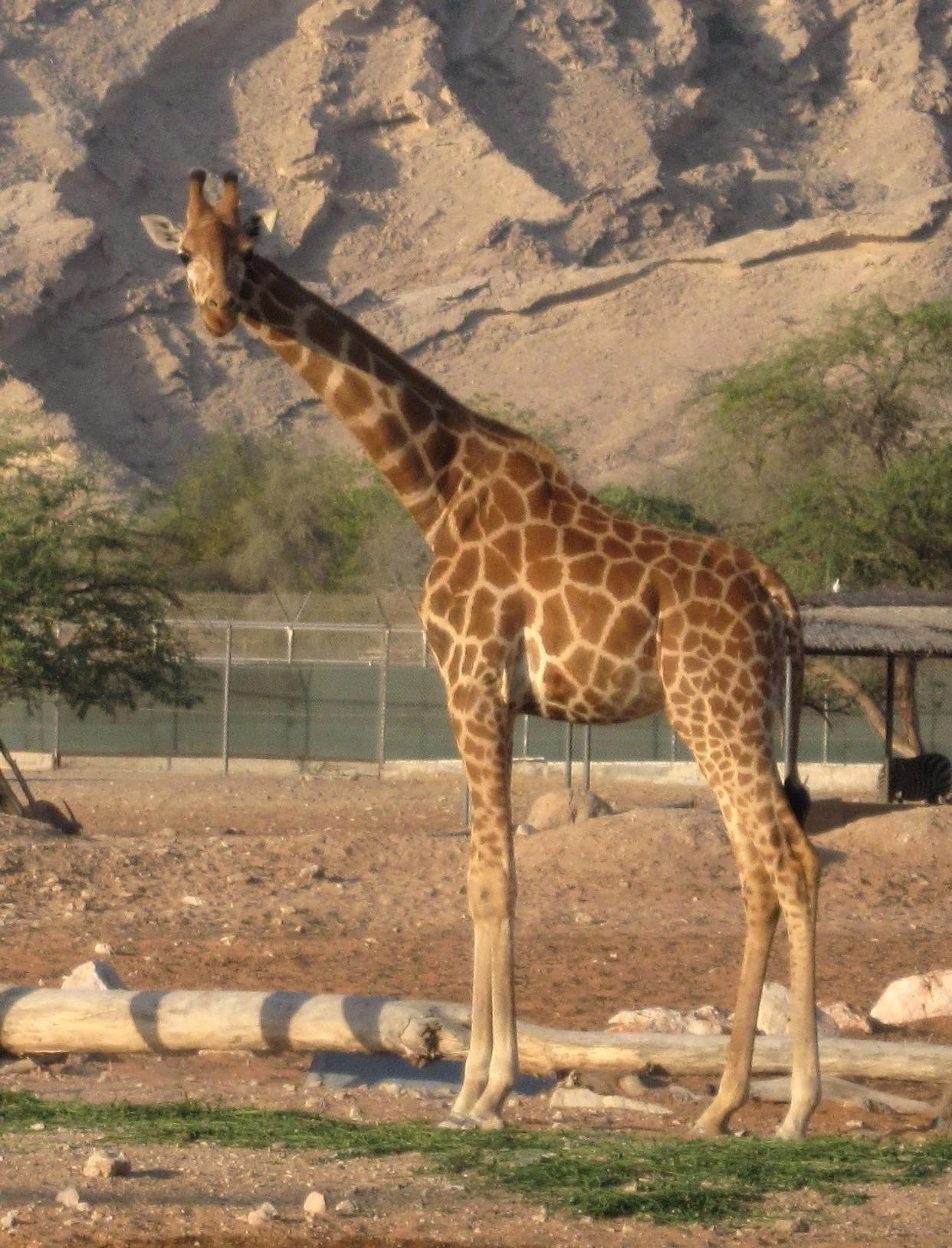
- A Nubian giraffe of the original phenotype at Al Ain Zoo in the United Arab Emirates

Conservation status
- Critically Endangered (IUCN 3.1)

Scientific classification
- Kingdom: Animalia
- Phylum: Chordata
- Class: Mammalia
- Order: Artiodactyla
- Family: Giraffidae
- Genus: Giraffa
- Species: G. camelopardalis
- Subspecies: G. c. camelopardalis

Trinomial name
- Giraffa camelopardalis camelopardalis (Linnaeus, 1758)
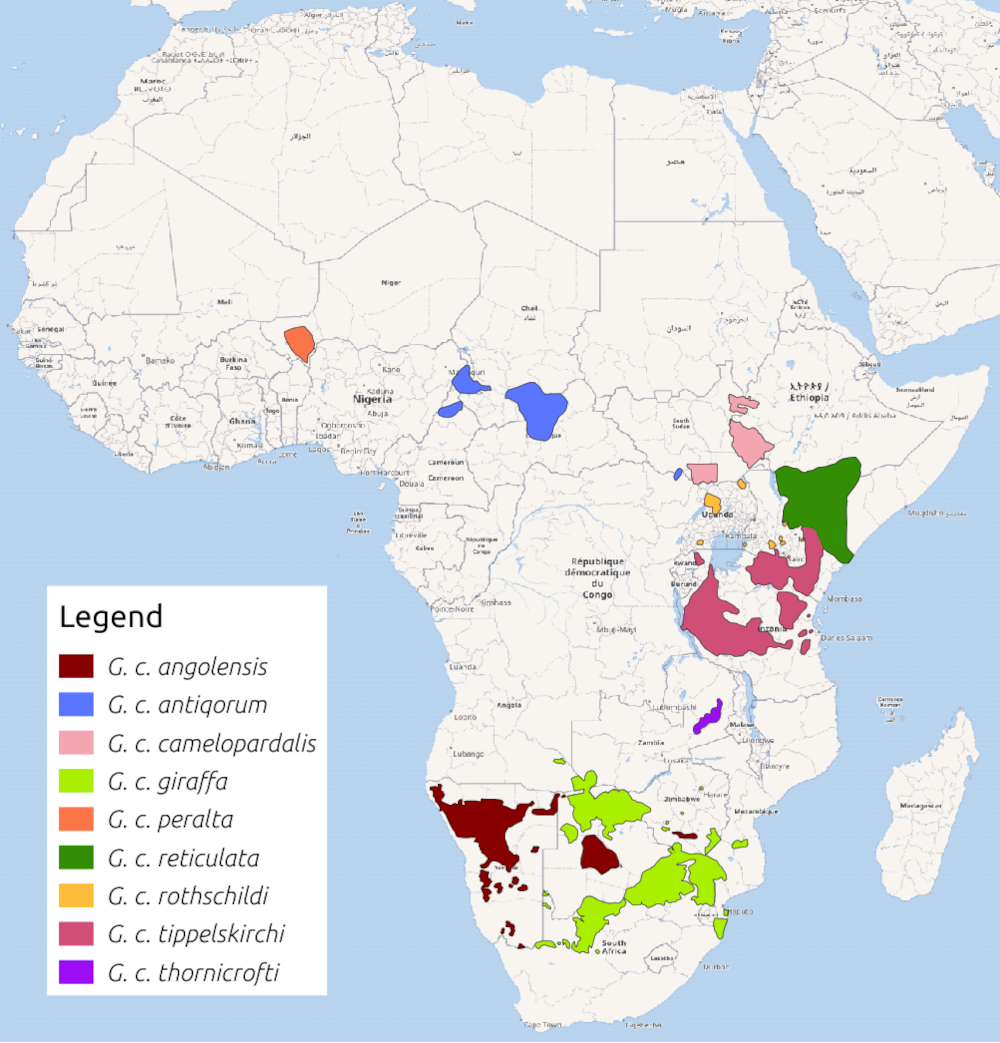
- Range in light pink

Synonyms
- G. c. rothschildi (Lydekker, 1903)

= Nubian giraffe =

Subspecies of giraffe

The Nubian giraffe (Giraffa camelopardalis camelopardalis), also known as Baringo giraffe or Ugandan giraffe, is the nominate subspecies of Northern giraffe. It is found in Ethiopia, Kenya, Uganda, South Sudan and Sudan. It is currently extinct in the wild of the Democratic Republic of Congo, Egypt and Eritrea. The Nubian giraffe used to be widespread in northeast Africa. The subspecies was listed as Critically Endangered by the IUCN in 2018 for the first time due to a 95% decline in the past three decades.

== Taxonomy and evolution ==
As of August 2025, the IUCN recognizes four species of giraffe, with the Nubian giraffe being a subspecies of Northern giraffe. The Nubian giraffe, along with the Northern giraffe, were first known by the binomen Cervus camelopardalis described by Swedish zoologist Carl Linnaeus in the Systema Naturæ per regna tria naturæ, secundum classes, ordines, genera, species, cum characteribus, differentiis, synonymis, locis in 1758. He described the giraffe from Ethiopia or Sennar of Eastern Sudan.

Following Linnaeus's description of the Nubian giraffe, several specimens were described by other naturalists and zoologists since the end of the 18th century under different scientific names, which are all considered synonyms of Giraffa camelopardalis camelopardalis today:

- G. c. aethiopicus by Ogilby, 1836
- G. c. senaariensis by Trouessart, 1898
- G. c. typica by Bryden, 1899
- G. c. congoensis by Lydekker, 1903

A 2016 analysis of giraffe subspecies proposed that the Rothschild's giraffe (G. c. rothschildi) could be considered a conspecific ecotype of the Nubian giraffe, but these results are not definitive.

== Physical description ==
The Nubian giraffe has sharply defined chestnut-colored spots surrounded by mostly white lines, while undersides lack spotting. The median lump is particularly developed in the male giraffe. The most extraordinary characteristic of the Nubian giraffe is that the extreme length of the forelegs gives the animal a huge stride, so that in spite of a rather slow galloping rhythm it can move at speeds up to 48 km/h (30 mph).

== Habitat population ==
Giraffes occurred everywhere in Africa; the Nubian giraffe was widespread throughout North Africa, from Kenya to Egypt. The giraffe lives in savannahs and woodlands. The Nubian giraffe currently lives in eastern South Sudan and southwestern Ethiopia, and isolated pockets in Uganda and Kenya. It was estimated in 2010 that fewer than 250 live in the wild, although this number was uncertain. However, as of 2016, it was estimated that 2,150 Nubian giraffes live in the wild, 1,500 of those of the Rothschild's ecotype. Fewer than 200 now live in western Ethiopia and about 450 in eastern South Sudan. There are 800 in Kenya and more than 1,550 in Uganda.

== In captivity ==
If the Rothschild's giraffe is considered synonymous with the Nubian giraffe, then this taxon is one of the most common giraffe types present in captivity, in conjunction with the reticulated giraffe. If it isn't however, as of 2003 the Al Ain Zoo in the United Arab Emirates is one of the very few zoos to be breeding the animals. The Nubian giraffe is also breeding in captivity in Giza Zoo, Egypt.

Nubian giraffe at Beijing Wildlife Park, China

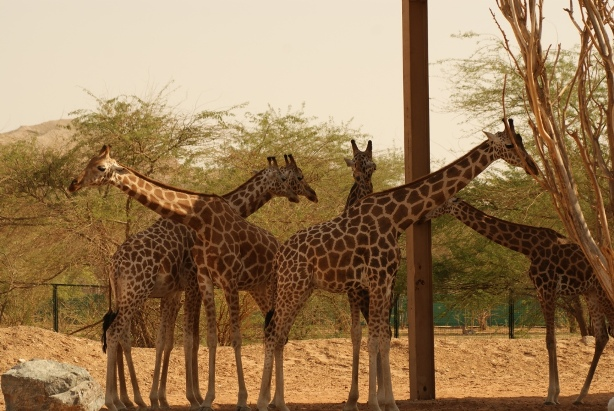
Nubian giraffes at Al Ain Zoo, United Arab Emirates.

== See also ==
- Zarafa (giraffe), the most famous of three Nubian giraffes gifted from Muhammad Ali of Egypt to European rulers in 1827
