= Nicolas Huet the Younger =

French painter, illustrator and engraver

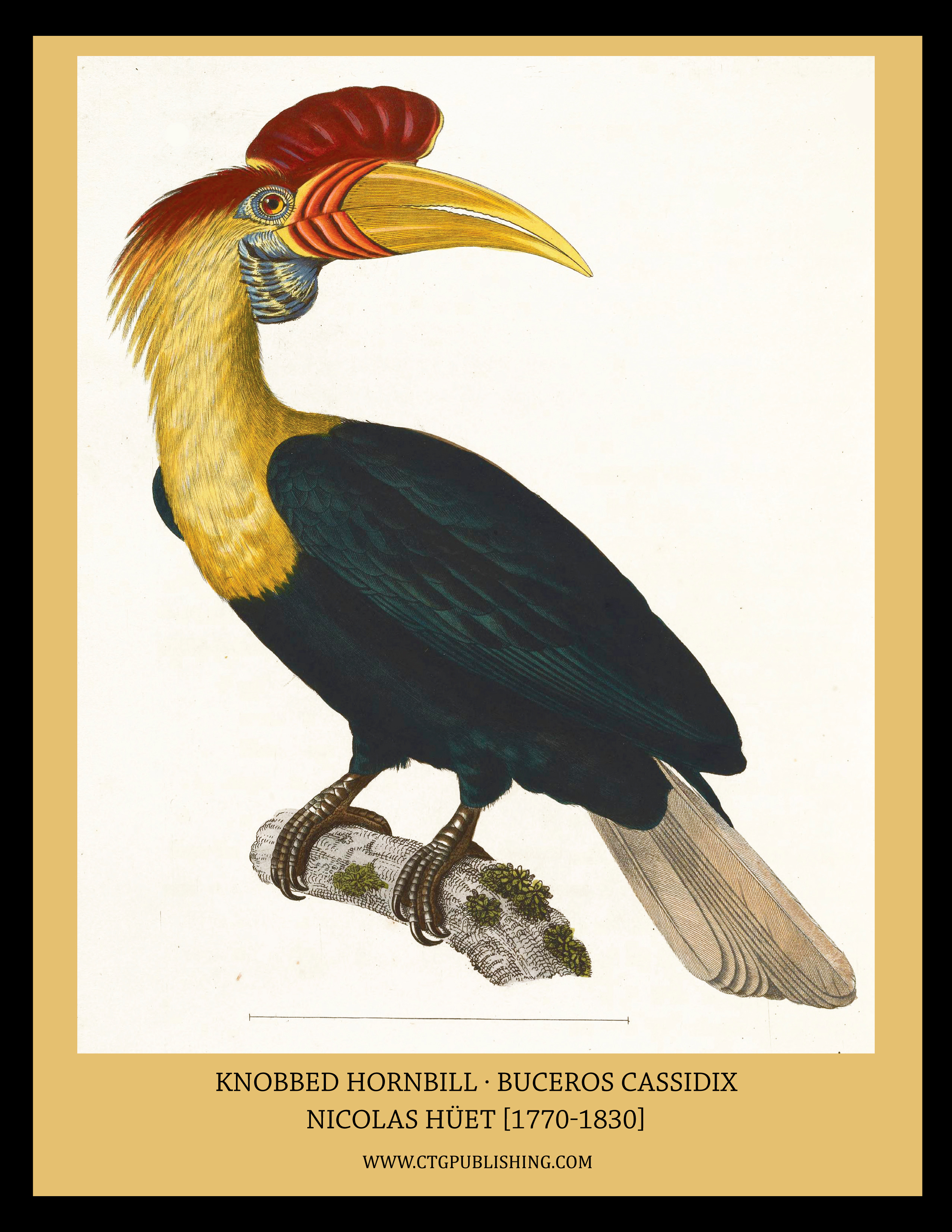
Rhyticeros cassidix (knobbed hornbill)

Nicolas Huet the Younger (1770 Louvre – 26 December 1830 Paris), aka Nicolas Huet II or as Nicolas Huet le Jeune, was a French natural history illustrator, active 1788–1827.

Nicolas Huet was the eldest son and pupil of Jean-Baptiste Huet, who was in turn the son of Nicolas Huet the Elder, all skilled painters and engravers of animal life, together with Nicolas Huet the Younger's siblings, François Huet (1772–1813) and Jean-Baptiste Huet II (born 1772). In 1792 he and his two brothers enlisted with the volunteers of Seine-et-Oise; he became a lieutenant and took part in the Battle of Jemappes. He also took part in Napoleon’s scientific and artistic exploration of Egypt between 1798 and 1801, subsequently illustrating the government's report. Huet was a skilled watercolourist and engraver, who acquired a reputation as natural history draughtsman. In October 1804, after the death of Oudinot, he was designated painter to the Muséum d’Histore Naturelle and to the ménagerie of the Empress Joséphine - a collection of animals, birds and plants, many depicted by Huet. He also illustrated works by the naturalists Étienne Geoffroy Saint-Hilaire and Georges Cuvier.

Huet produced a series of 246 animal drawings on vellum for the library of the Muséum d’Histoire Naturelle, and these were published in 1808 as 'Collection de mammifères du Muséum d’Histoire Naturelle'. From 1823 until his death Huet was 'Professeur d’iconographie des animaux', and continued exhibiting drawings and watercolours of animals at various salons until shortly before his death. Huet was also commissioned to create elaborate drawings of animals, often on vellum, for notables such as Frederick Augustus II of Saxony, and the military officer André Masséna, Prince d’Essling and Duc de Rivoli.

Lambert Frères published a number of his images, and these were engraved by his brother Jean Baptiste, who also engraved Nicolas’ depictions of mammals. He also illustrated 'l’Histoire naturelle des mollusques terrestres et fluviatiles', and 'Nouveau recueil de planches coloriées d’oiseaux'. On the death of Gerard van Spaendonck in 1822, Nicolas and Pierre-Joseph Redouté took charge of the iconography course at the Muséum d’Histore Naturelle.

Among his paintings is a watercolor of the famous giraffe that Muhammad Ali Pasha, the ruler of Egypt, sent as a diplomatic gift to Charles X of France in 1826-27. This painting is now in the collections of the Morgan Library and Museum in New York.

Nicolas died on 26 December 1830 leaving no children.

== Gallery ==
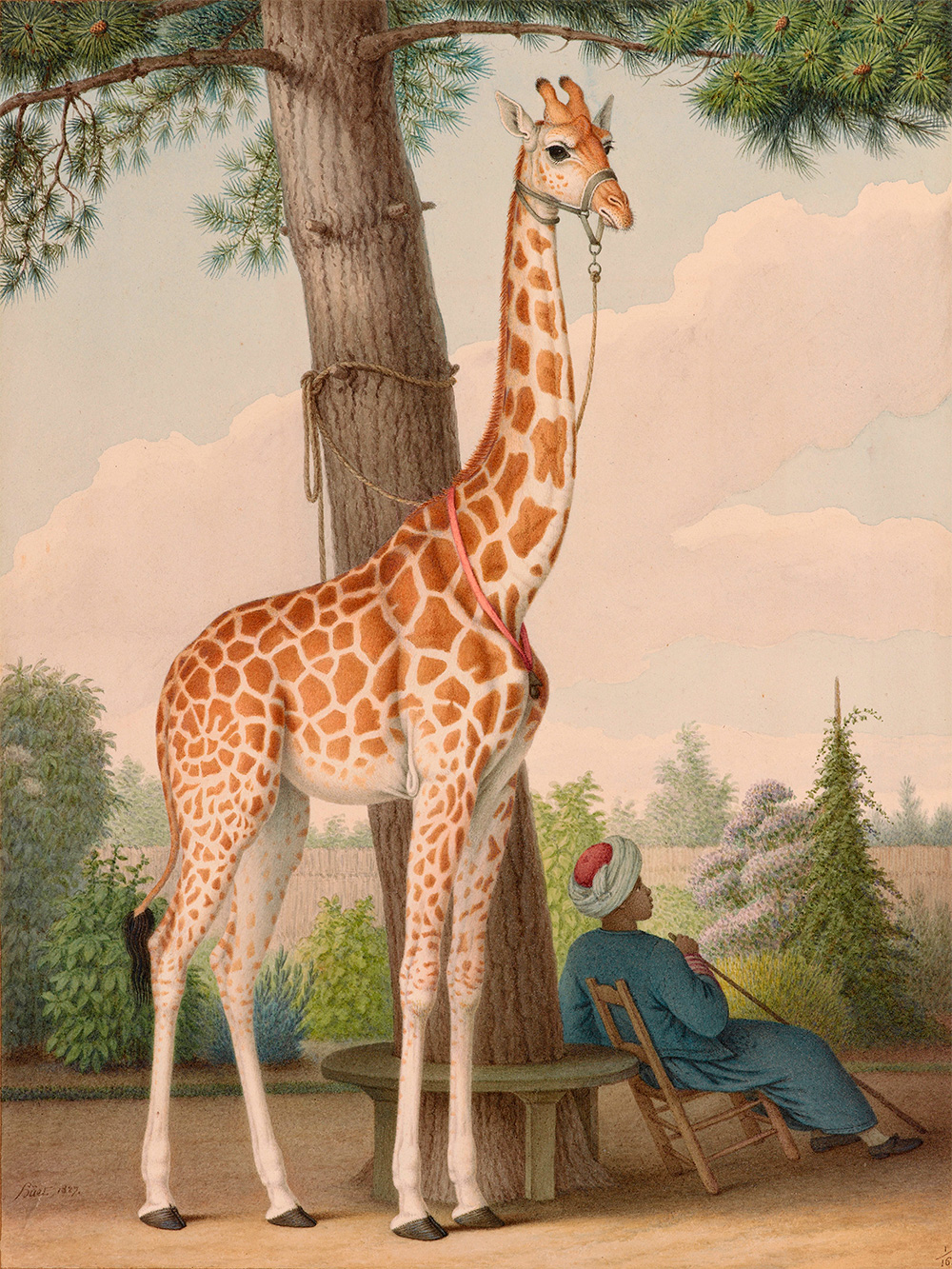
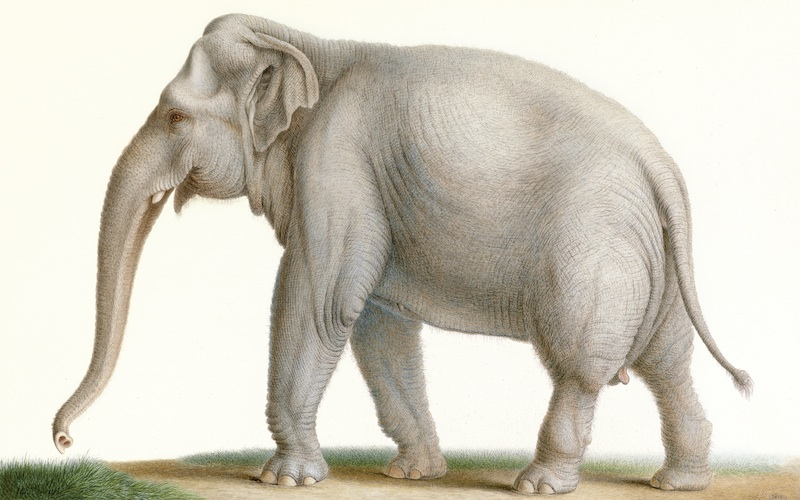
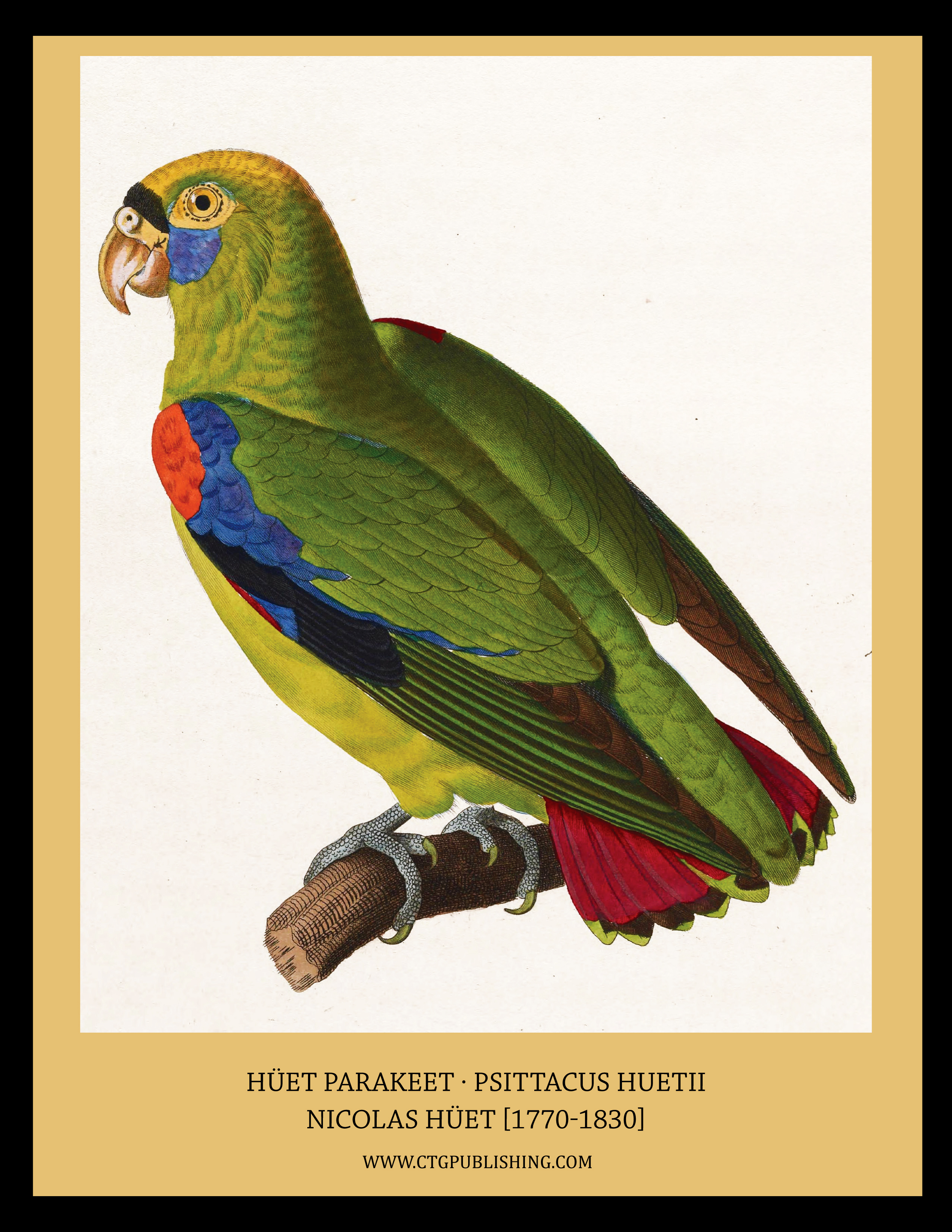
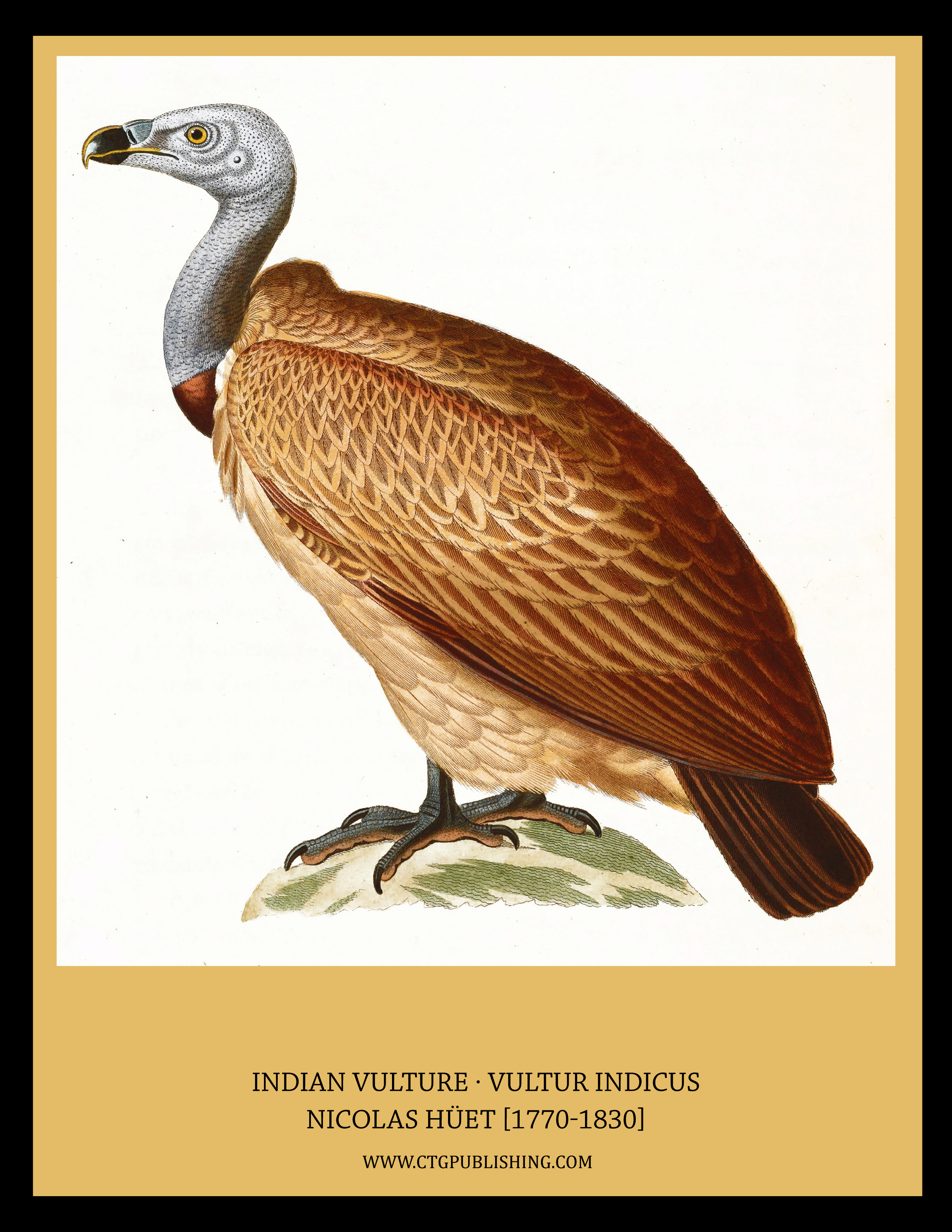
