= Forsten =

Forsten is a surname. Notable people with the surname include:

- Aino Forsten (1885–1937), Finnish politician and educator
- Eltio Alegondas Forsten (1811–1843), Dutch naturalist
- G. V. Forsten (1857–1910), Finnish historian and professor

== See also ==
- Boiga forsteni, a species of snake known as Forsten's cat snake
- Dusky megapode, a species of bird also known as Forsten's scrubfowl
- Forsten's tortoise, a species of tortoise
- Scarus forsteni, a species of fish also known as Forsten's parrotfish
- Sunset lorikeet, a species of parrot also known as Forsten's lorikeet
