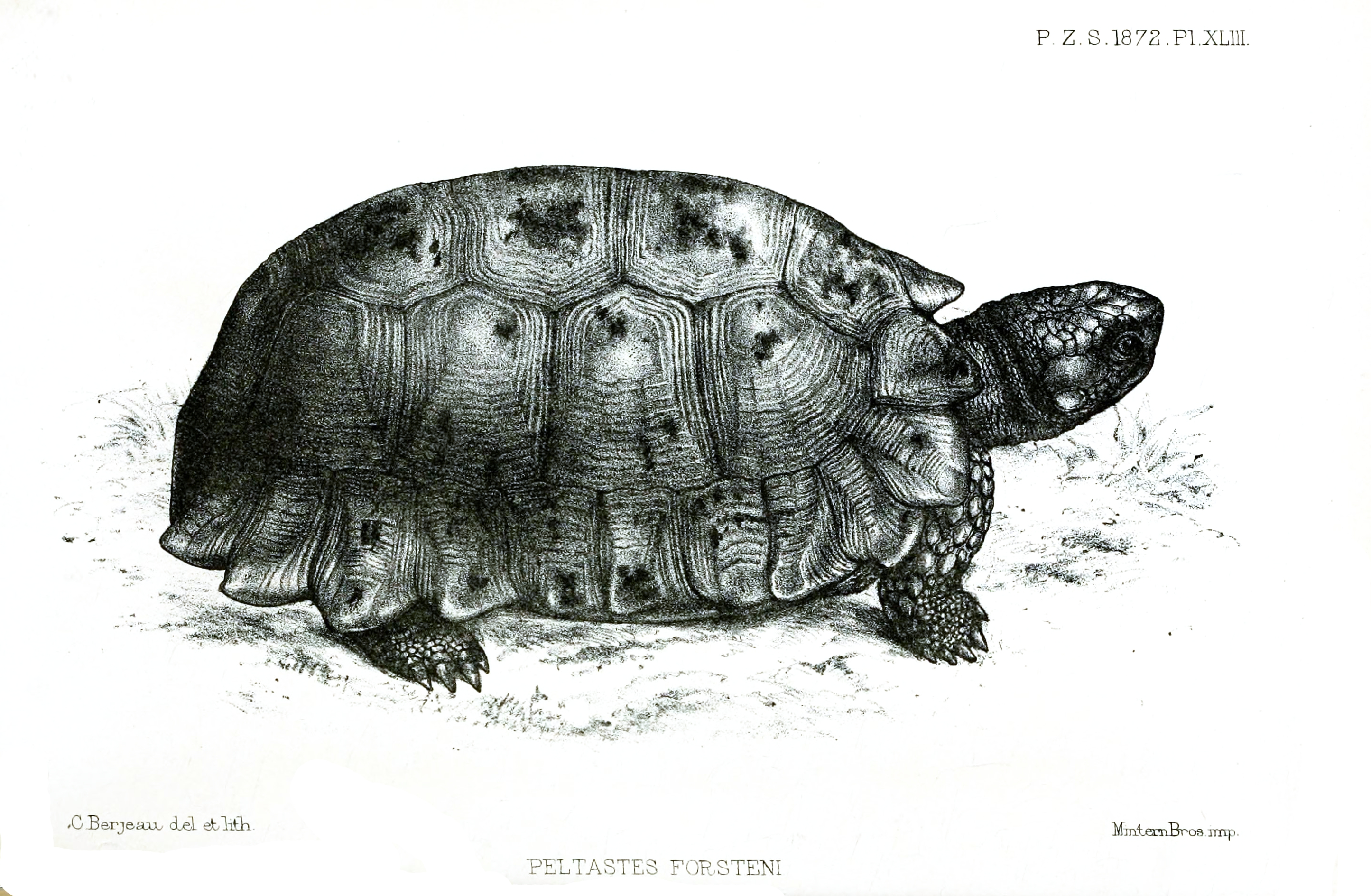

Conservation status
- Critically Endangered (IUCN 3.1)

Scientific classification
- Kingdom: Animalia
- Phylum: Chordata
- Class: Reptilia
- Order: Testudines
- Suborder: Cryptodira
- Family: Testudinidae
- Genus: Indotestudo
- Species: I. forstenii

Binomial name
- Indotestudo forstenii (Schlegel & S. Müller, 1845)

Synonyms
- Testudo forstenii Schlegel & S. Müller, 1845; Peltastes forstenii — Gray, 1872; Testudo forsteni E. Williams, 1952 (ex errore); Geochelone forsteni — Pritchard, 1967; Geochelone forstenii — Honegger, 1980; Indotestudo forstenii — Bour, 1980; Indotestudo forsteni — Groombridge, 1982; Indotestudo elongata forsteni — Obst, 1985; Geochelone elongata forsteni — Gosławski & Hryniewicz, 1993; Indotestudo foresternii Choudhury & Bhupathy, 1993 (ex errore)

= Forsten's tortoise =

Species of tortoise

Forsten's tortoise (Indotestudo forstenii), also known commonly as the Sulawesi tortoise, is a species of tortoise in the family Testudinidae. The species is native to Sulawesi Island, Indonesia.

== Taxonomy ==
Forsten's tortoise is one of three tortoise species placed in the genus Indotestudo, the others being the elongated tortoise (I. elongata), and the Travancore tortoise (I. travancorica).

== Etymology ==
The specific name, forstenii, is in honor of Dutch botanist Eltio Alegondas Forsten.

== Geographic range ==
I. forstenii can be found on Sulawesi Island of Indonesia, and its nearby islands such as Halmahera island. In Sulawesi, it is found in the central and northern parts of the island.

In North Sulawesi, it is found in Mount Boliahutu and around Buol, while in Central Sulawesi, it is found in Santigi, Morowali Reserve, Palu Valley, Kulawi Valley, Bora Village near Gimpu, and along the western border of Lore Lindu National Park.

== Habitat ==
The preferred natural habitat of I. forstenii is forest.

== Reproduction ==
I. forstenii is oviparous. Sexually mature females lay clutches of eggs throughout the year. Each clutch consists of one or two eggs.

== Gallery ==
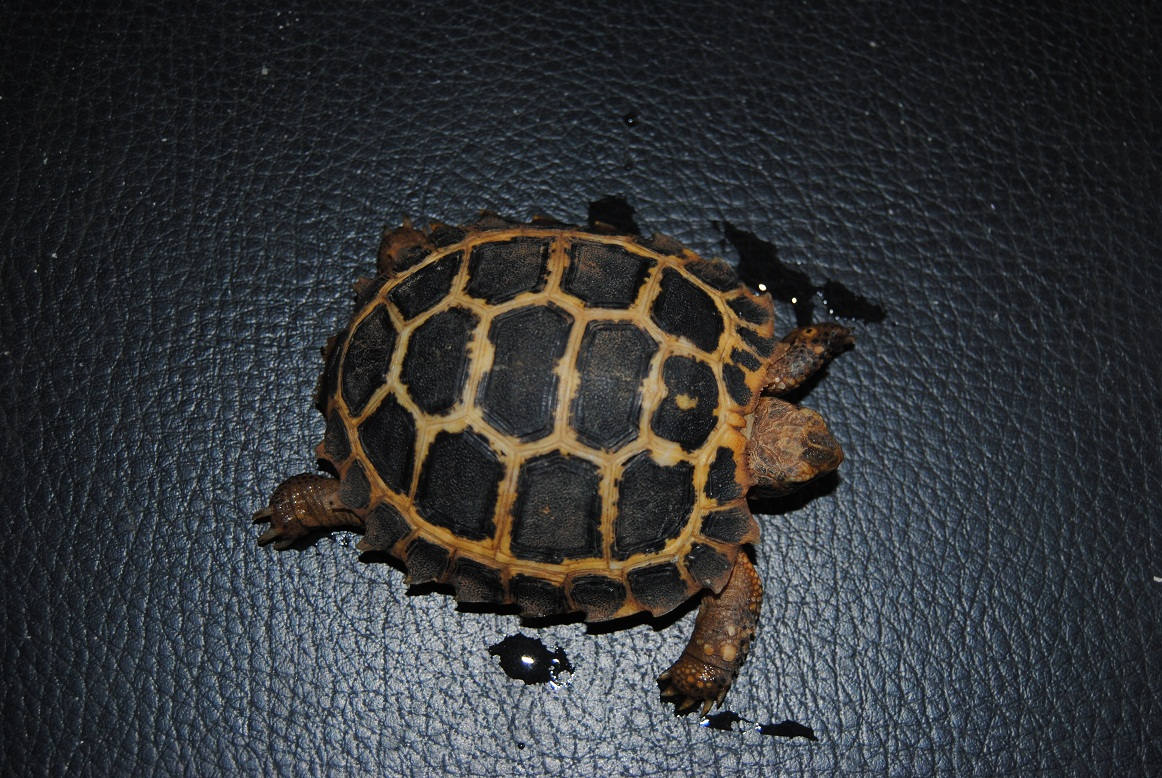
Baby Forsten's tortoise

== See also ==
- Sulawesi forest turtle (Leucocephalon yuwonoi) – another threatened turtle endemic to Sulawesi, Indonesia.
