= Rabdion grovesi =

Conservation status
- Data Deficient (IUCN 3.1)

Scientific classification
- Kingdom: Animalia
- Phylum: Chordata
- Class: Reptilia
- Order: Squamata
- Suborder: Serpentes
- Family: Colubridae
- Genus: Rabdion
- Species: R. grovesi

Binomial name
- Rabdion grovesi Amarasinghe, G. Vogel, Mcguire, Sidik, Supriatna & Ineich, 2015

Species of snake

Rabdion grovesi, Groves's pointed snake, is a species of snake in the family Colubridae.

== Geographic range ==
R. grovesi is only known from the island of Sulawesi in Indonesia.
