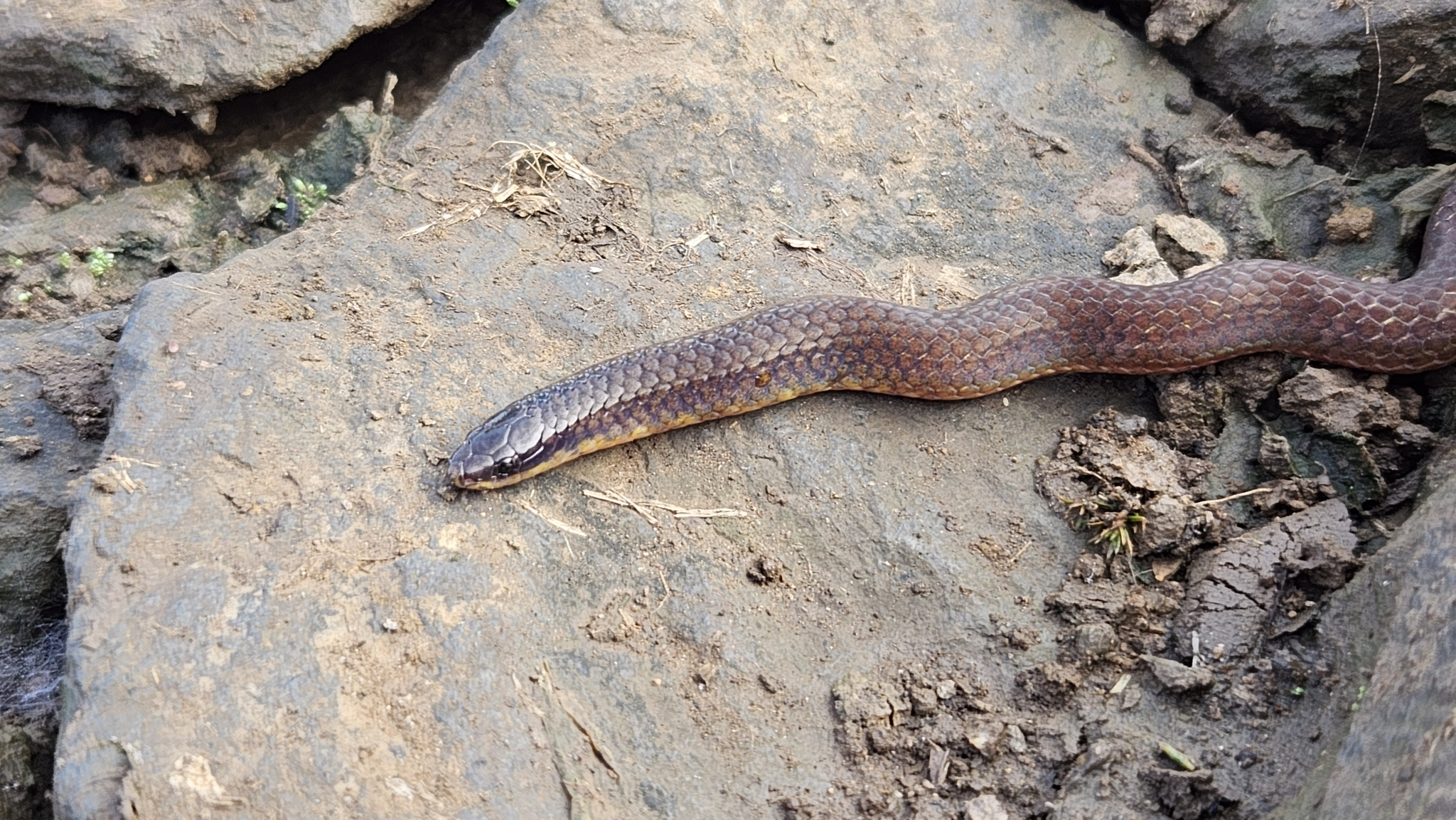

Conservation status
- Vulnerable (IUCN 3.1)

Scientific classification
- Kingdom: Animalia
- Phylum: Chordata
- Class: Reptilia
- Order: Squamata
- Suborder: Serpentes
- Family: Colubridae
- Genus: Rabdion
- Species: R. forsteni

Binomial name
- Rabdion forsteni A.M.C. Duméril, Bibron & A.H.A. Duméril, 1854

Synonyms
- Rabdion forsteni A.M.C. Duméril, Bibron & A.H.A. Duméril, 1854; Rhabdion [sic] forsteni Günther, 1858 (ex errore); Rhabdophidium forsteni Boulenger, 1894; Rabdion forsteni — Leviton, 1958; Rabdion forsteni — Wallach et al., 2014

= Rabdion forsteni =

Species of snake

Rabdion forsteni, also known commonly as Forsten's pointed snake, is a species of snake in the family Colubridae. The species is native to a part of Indonesia.

== Etymology ==
The specific name, forsteni, is in honor of Dutch naturalist Eltio Alegondas Forsten.

== Geographic range ==
R. forsteni is endemic to the island of Sulawesi (formerly called Celebes) in Indonesia.

== Habitat ==
The preferred natural habitat of R. forsteni is forest, at altitudes up to 1,830 m (6,000 ft).

== Reproduction ==
R. forsteni is oviparous.
