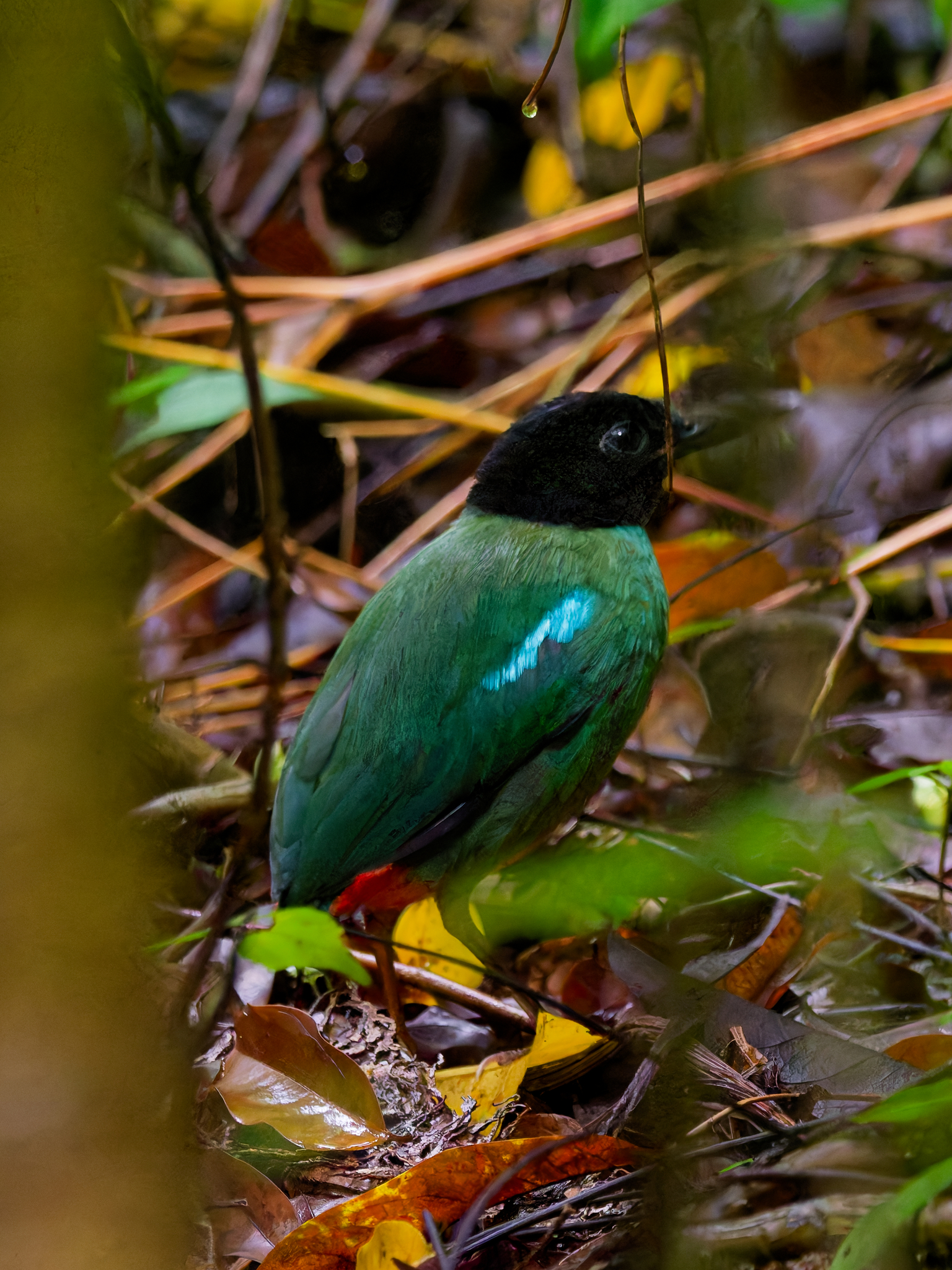

Scientific classification
- Kingdom: Animalia
- Phylum: Chordata
- Class: Aves
- Order: Passeriformes
- Family: Pittidae
- Genus: Pitta
- Species: P. forsteni

Binomial name
- Pitta forsteni (Bonaparte, 1850)

Synonyms
- List: Brachyurus forsteni Bonaparte, 1850; Melanopitta bonapartena Mathews, 1926; Pitta melanocephala Müller & Schlegel, 1839; Pitta sordida forsteni (Bonaparte, 1850)

= Minahasa hooded pitta =

Species of bird

The Minahasa hooded pitta (Pitta forsteni) is a species of passerine bird in the pitta family Pittidae that is endemic to the Minahasa Peninsula at the north of the island of Sulawesi.

It is a green bird with a black head and chestnut crown. It forages on the ground for insects and their larvae, and also eats berries. It breeds between February and August, the pair being strongly territorial and building their nest on the ground. Incubation and care of the fledglings is done by both parents. It was formerly considered to be a subspecies of the hooded pitta, now renamed to the western hooded pitta.

== Taxonomy ==
The Minahasa hooded pitta was formally described in 1850 by the French naturalist Charles Lucien Bonaparte under the binomial name Brachyurus forsteni. This was a replacement name for Pitta melanocephala Müller, S and Schlegel, 1845. The specific epithet was chosen to honour the memory of the Dutch naturalist Eltio Alegondas Forsten, the collector of the specimen described by Müller and Schlegel.
