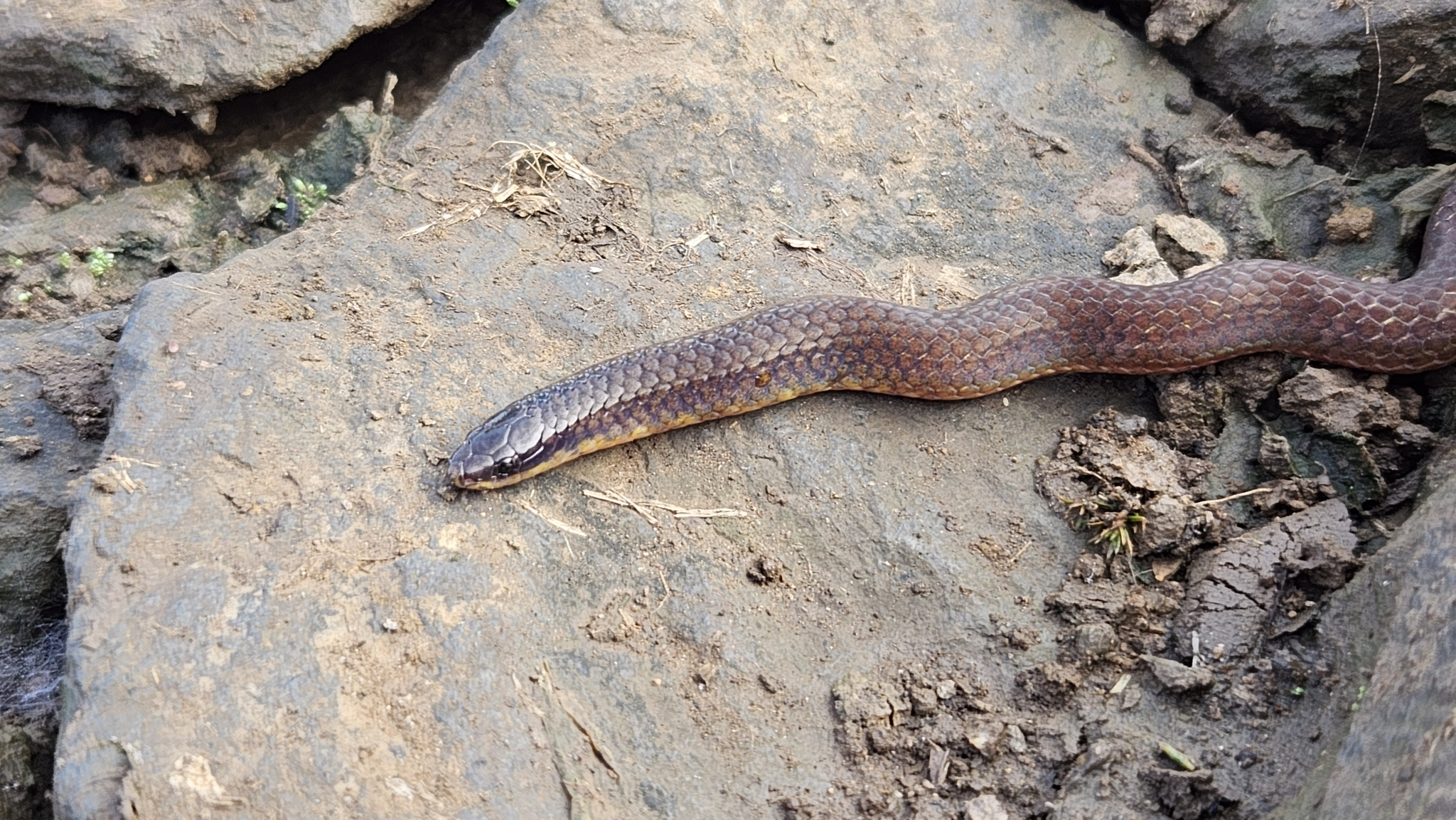
- R. forsteni in Sulawesi Selatan, Indonesia

Scientific classification
- Kingdom: Animalia
- Phylum: Chordata
- Class: Reptilia
- Order: Squamata
- Suborder: Serpentes
- Family: Colubridae
- Subfamily: Calamariinae
- Genus: Rabdion; A.M.C. Duméril, 1853

Synonyms
- Rabdion A.M.C. Duméril, 1853; Rhabdophidium Boulenger, 1894; Rabdion — Leviton, 1958

= Rabdion =

Genus of snakes

Rabdion is a genus of snakes of the family Colubridae.

== Species ==
The genus Rhabdion contains the following two valid species.

- Rabdion forsteni A.M.C. Duméril, Bibron & A.H.A. Duméril, 1854 - Forsten's pointed snake
- Rabdion grovesi Amarasinghe, G. Vogel, McGuire, Sidik, Supriatna & Ineich, 2015 - Groves’s pointed snake
