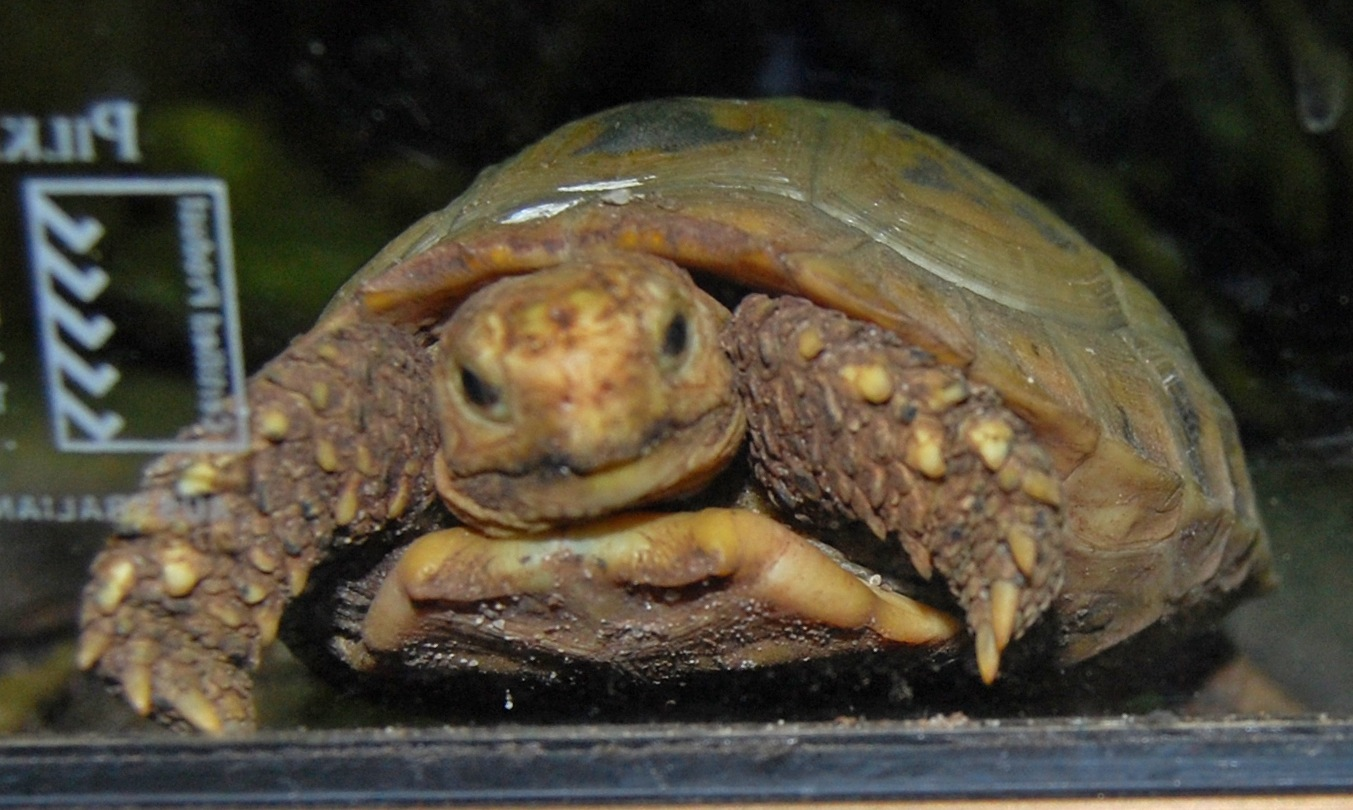
- Indotestudo elongata

Scientific classification
- Kingdom: Animalia
- Phylum: Chordata
- Class: Reptilia
- Order: Testudines
- Suborder: Cryptodira
- Family: Testudinidae
- Genus: Indotestudo; Lindolm, 1929

Species
- Indotestudo elongata Indotestudo forstenii Indotestudo travancorica

= Indotestudo =

Genus of tortoises

Indotestudo is a genus of tortoises in the family Testudinidae. The genus is native to South and Southeast Asia. The three species in the genus are all threatened.

== Species ==
Indotestudo contains the following species:

Image	Common name	Scientific name	Distribution
	Elongated tortoise	Indotestudo elongata	India (Tripura, Jalpaiguri, East Bengal, and Singhbhum in Jharkhand), Nepal, Bangladesh, Burma (or Myanmar), Laos, Thailand (incl. Phuket), Cambodia, Vietnam, Western Malaysia, Southern China
	Forsten's tortoise	Indotestudo forstenii	Sulawesi Island of Indonesia, and its nearby islands such as Halmahera island
	Travancore tortoise	Indotestudo travancorica	India ( Kerala, Karnataka and Tamil Nadu.)
