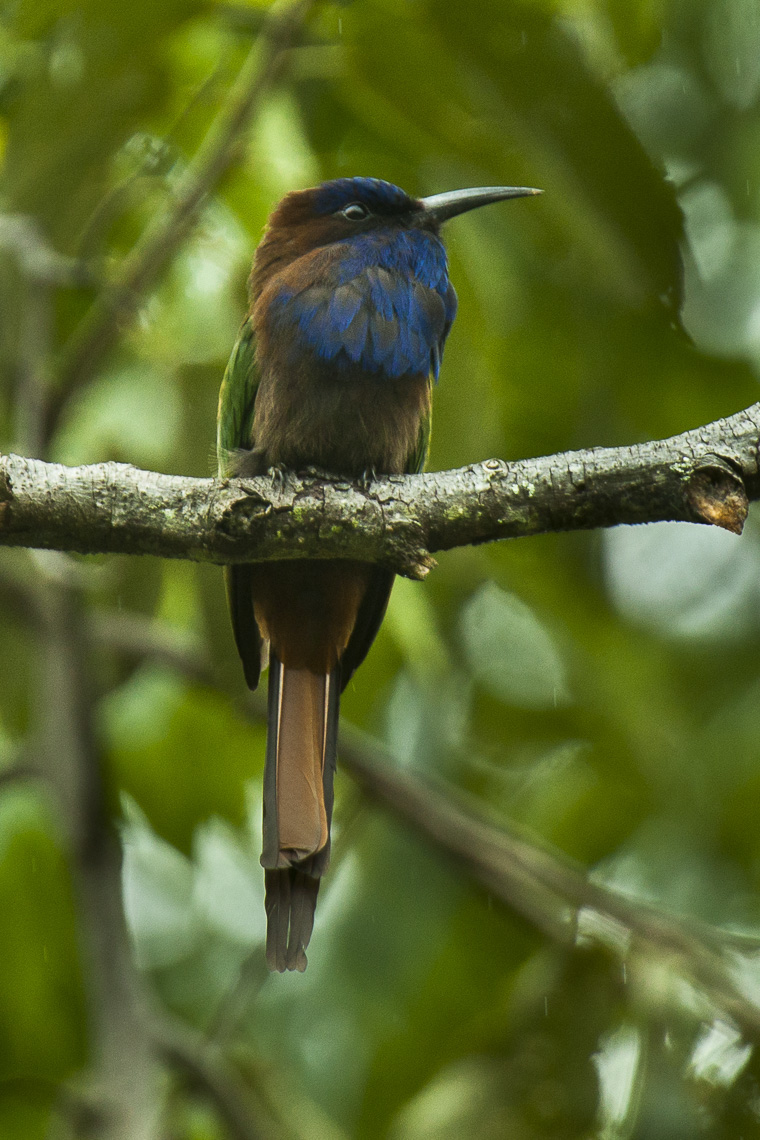

Conservation status
- Least Concern (IUCN 3.1)

Scientific classification
- Kingdom: Animalia
- Phylum: Chordata
- Class: Aves
- Order: Coraciiformes
- Family: Meropidae
- Genus: Meropogon; Bonaparte, 1850
- Species: M. forsteni

Binomial name
- Meropogon forsteni Bonaparte, 1850

= Purple-bearded bee-eater =

Species of bird

Purple-bearded Bee-eater, striking its prey against a branch

The purple-bearded bee-eater or Celebes bee-eater (Meropogon forsteni) is a species of bee-eater endemic to the island of Sulawesi, Indonesia. This species is often seen in clearings inside dense forest.

The purple-bearded bee-eater is the only member of the genus Meropogon. Its scientific name commemorates Eltio Alegondas Forsten (1811–1843) who collected in the East Indies between 1838 and 1842.

== Description ==
The purple-bearded bee-eater is a colourful long bird with a long tail, long slender decurved beak and rather rounded wings. It is 25–26 cm (9.8–10.2 in) long, excluding 66 cm (26 in) of tail streamers.

The adult male has a purple head, face, "beard" (long hanging throat feathers), breast and upper belly. The upperparts, wings and tail are green, apart from a reddish-brown nape, and the central tail feathers are elongated as streamers. The lower belly is reddish-brown and the underside of the tail is chestnut.

The adult female is similar, but the forebelly is reddish-brown, not purple. Young birds have a green crown and nape, dusky face and bluish beard. They lack the elongated central tail feathers of the adult.

The call is a quiet high-pitched szit or peep.

== Behaviour ==
The purple-bearded bee-eater undertakes seasonal movements, breeding inland in the dry season, and moving to the coast in the rainy season. Like other bee-eaters it nests in burrows up to 90 cm long tunnelled into the side of sandy river banks, cliffs and cuttings, but does not form colonies.

The purple-bearded bee-eater, again like its relatives, eats insects, including bees, wasps and dragonflies and beetles, which are caught in flight. This species hunts alone or in pairs, rather than in flocks, and sits on a favoured perch for long periods, twisting its head with its beard flattened or plumped, and wagging its tail back and forth before sallying after passing prey.
