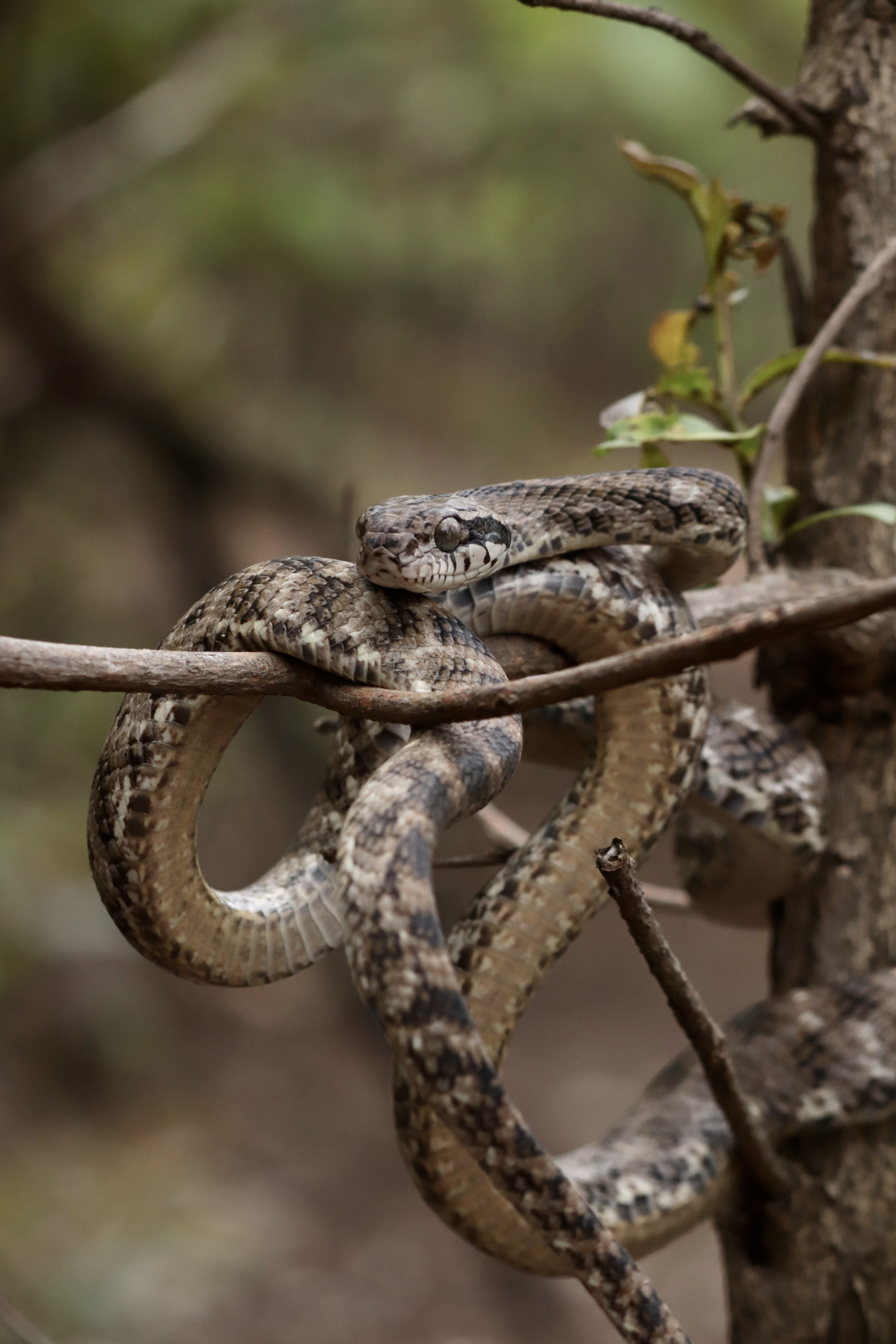

Conservation status
- Least Concern (IUCN 3.1)

Scientific classification
- Kingdom: Animalia
- Phylum: Chordata
- Class: Reptilia
- Order: Squamata
- Suborder: Serpentes
- Family: Colubridae
- Genus: Boiga
- Species: B. forsteni

Binomial name
- Boiga forsteni (A.M.C. Duméril, Bibron & A.H.A. Duméril, 1854)
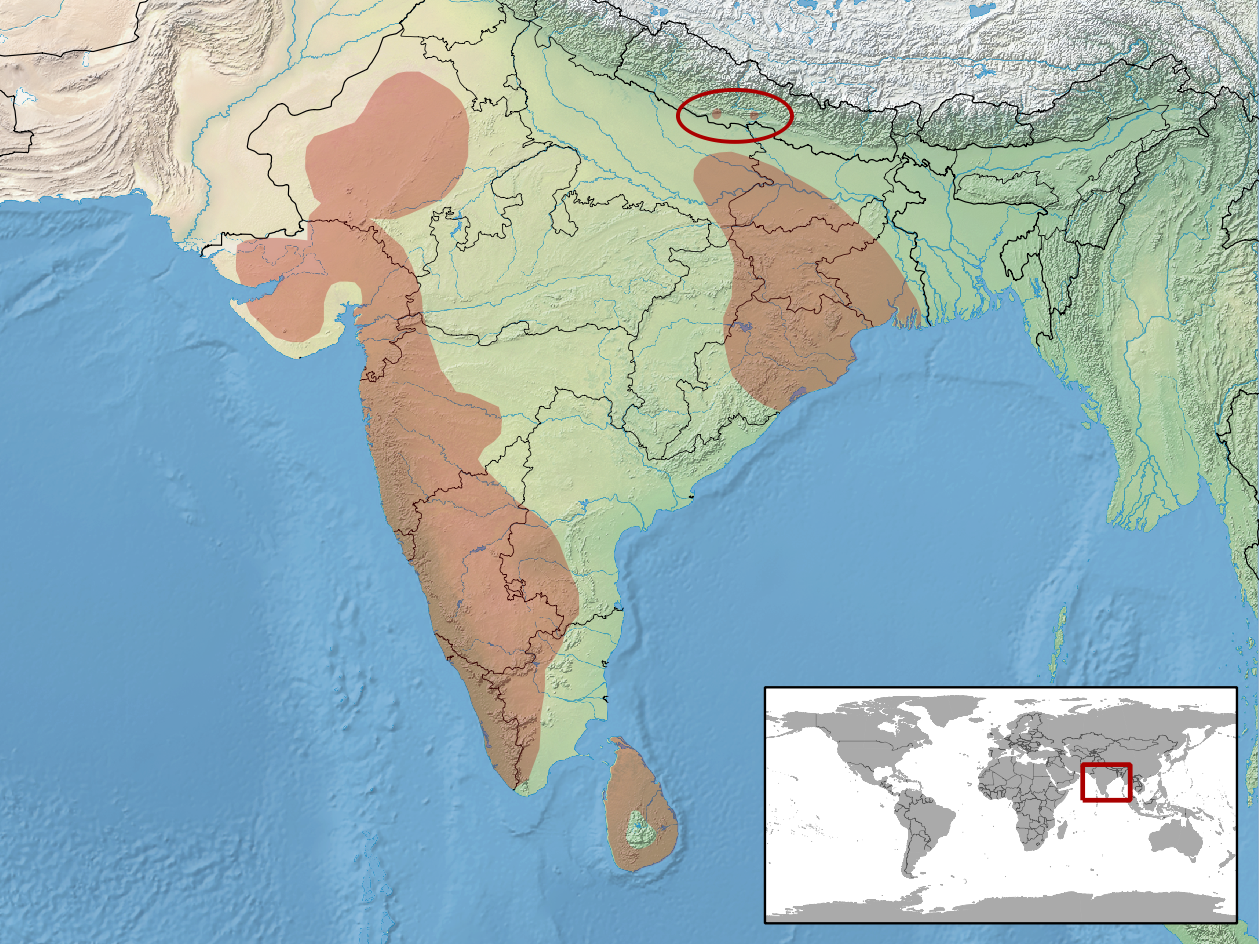

Synonyms
- Triglyphodon forsteni A.M.C. Duméril, Bibron & A.H.A. Duméril, 1854; Dipsas forsteni — Jan, 1863; Dipsadomorphus forsteni — Boulenger, 1896; Boiga forsteni — M.A. Smith, 1943

= Boiga forsteni =

Species of snake

Boiga forsteni, also known commonly as Forsten's cat snake, is a species of mildly venomous rear-fanged snake in the family Colubridae. The species is endemic to South Asia.

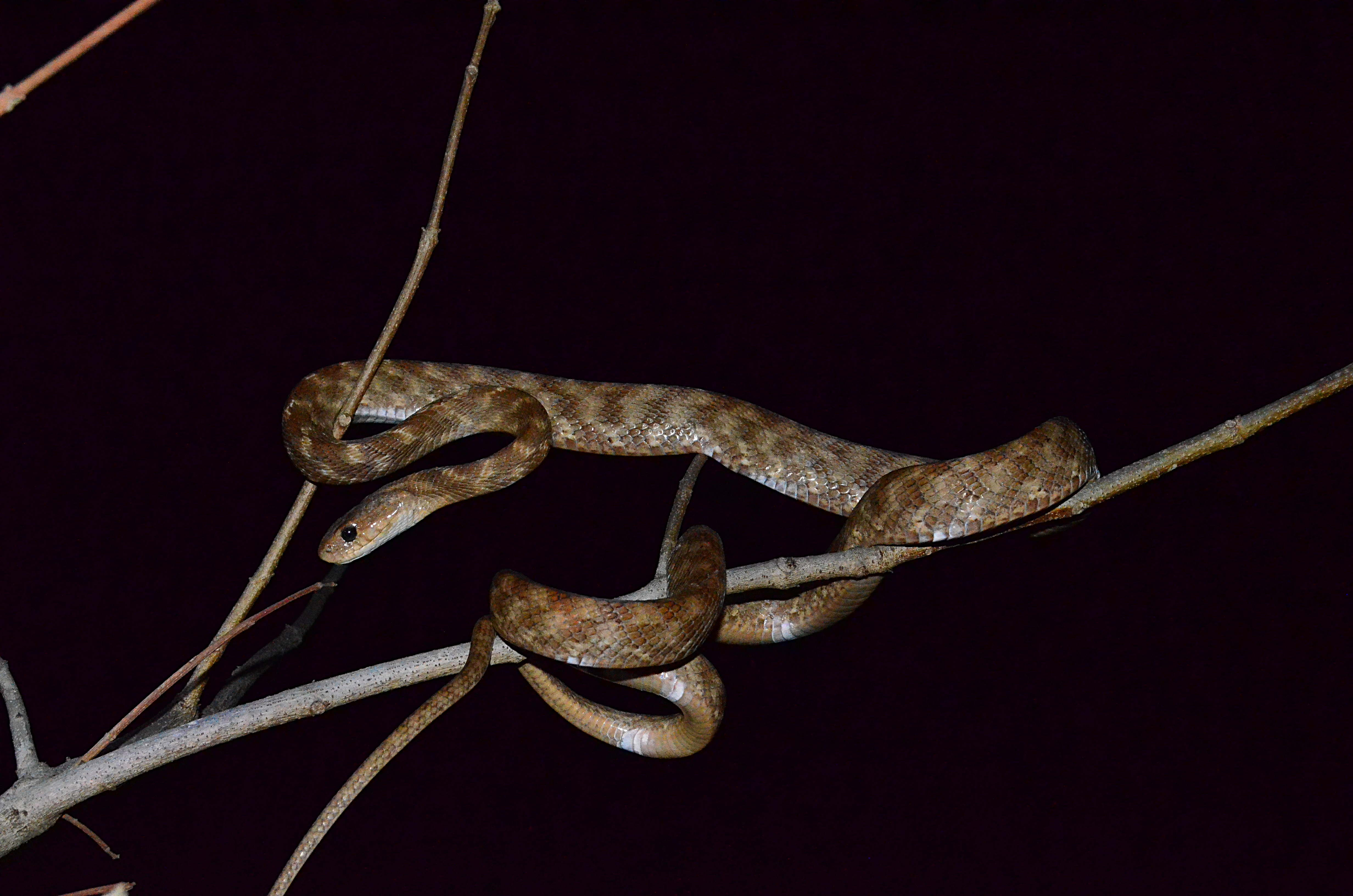
Forsten's cat snake in Dang, India

== Geographic range ==
Boiga forstenii is found in Nepal, Sri Lanka, and India (Sikkim, West Bengal, Maharashtra, Gujarat, Kerala, Uttar Pradesh to Bihar, Madhya Pradesh, Orissa, Andhra Pradesh, Tamil Nadu, southern Rajasthan, Uttarakhand, and Jharkhand).

== Etymology ==
The specific name, forstenii, is in honor of Dutch naturalist Eltio Alegondas Forsten (1811–1843).

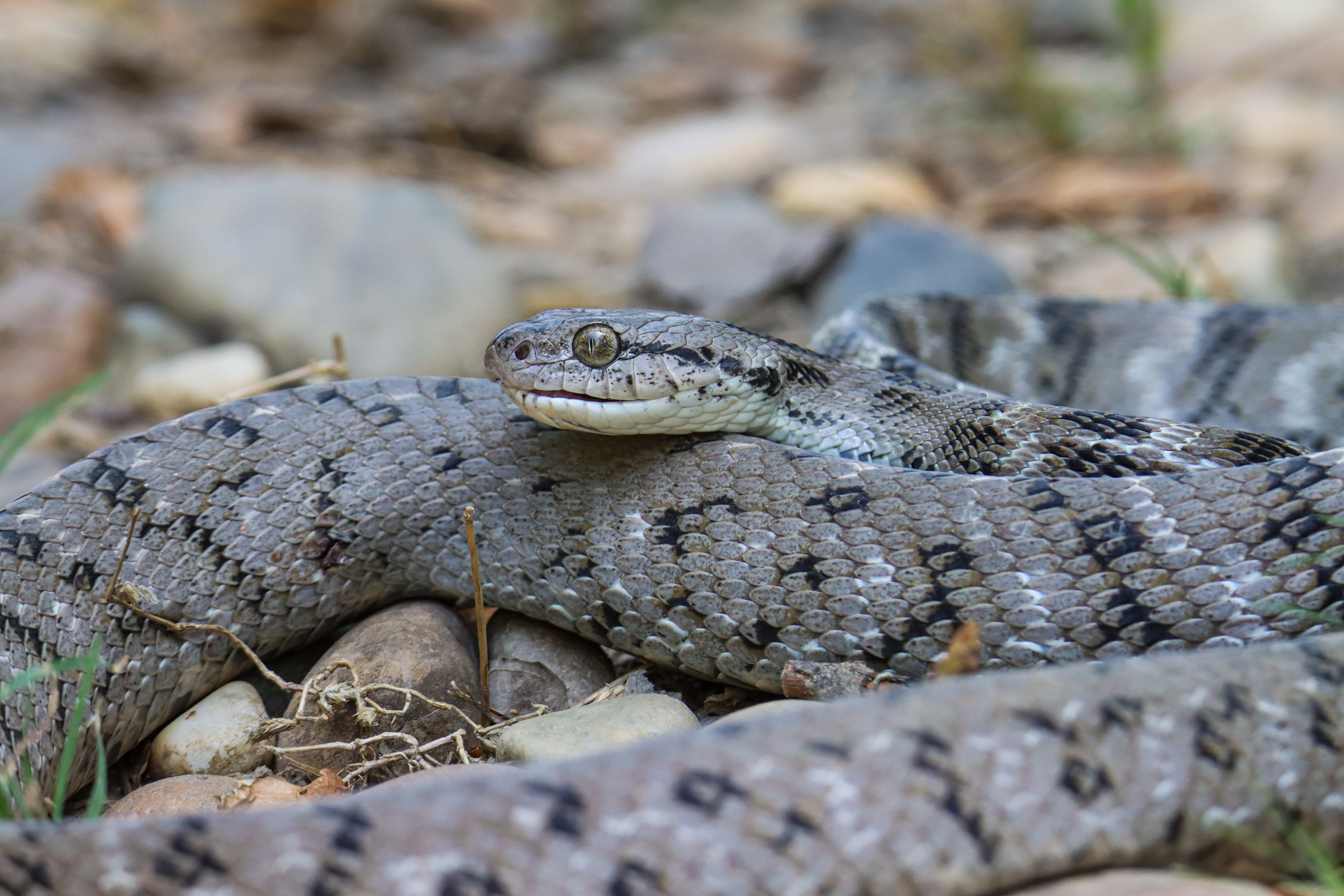
Forsten's Cat Snake photographed at Bardiya National Park.

== Description ==
See snake scales for terms used

In B. forsteni the anterior palatine and mandibular teeth are considerably larger than the others. The eye is about as long as its distance from the nostril.

The rostral scale is broader than deep, and the internasals are much shorter than the prefrontals. The frontal is nearly as long as its distance from the end of the snout, which is shorter than the parietal scales. The loreal is square or deeper than it is long. There is one preocular scale, extending to the upper surface of the head, and two or three postoculars. The temporal scales are very small and numerous. There are eight to eleven upper labials, with the third, fourth and fifth, or the fourth fifth and sixth entering the eye. There are three or four lower labials, in contact with the anterior chin shields, which are about as long as the posterior. The ventral scales number 259–270, the anal is entire, and the subcaudals number 106–131.

The body is laterally compressed. The dorsal scales are in 25 or 27 rows at midbody, disposed obliquely, and the vertebral row is feebly enlarged. The snake is brown above, with more or less regular angular black crossbars, with or without white spots between them. There is a black band from the frontal shield to the nape and another on each side behind the eye. The lower parts are white, uniform or spotted with brown.

The longest specimen examined by Boulenger in 1890 had a total length of 4 feet 10 inches (1.47 m), including a tail which was 1 ft (30 cm) long. According to Das (2002) maximum snout–vent length (SVL) is 2.3 m (7.5 ft).

== Habitat ==
The preferred habitats of B. forsteni are lowland forests and agricultural areas.

== Behavior ==
B. forsteni is nocturnal and arboreal.

== Diet ==
B. forsteni preys on lizards, snakes, birds, bats, and rodents.

== Venom ==
Like other species of the genus Boiga, B. forsteni possesses a mild venom.

== Reproduction ==
B. forsteni is an oviparous species. Sexually mature females lay 5–10 eggs. In India the eggs are laid in August and September.
