= Eltio Alegondas Forsten =

Dutch naturalist (1811–1843)

Eltio Alegondas Forsten (12 July 1811, Middelburg – 1843, Ambon Island) was a Dutch naturalist.

He studied medicine at Leiden, obtaining his degree in 1836 with a thesis on Cedrela febrifuga, titled "Dissertatio botanico-pharmaceutico-medica inauguralis de cedrela febrifuga". In 1838 he became a member of the Natuurkundige Commissie for the Dutch East Indies, where he would spend the next several years collecting zoological and botanical specimens (Java, Sulawesi, Ternate, Ambon).

== Eponymy (birds and reptiles) ==
- Forsten's cat snake, Boiga forsteni
- Forsten's lorikeet, Trichoglossus forsteni
- Forsten's megapode, Megapodius freycinet
- Forsten's pointed snake, Rabdion forsteni
- Forsten's tortoise, Indotestudo forstenii
- Purple-bearded bee-eater, Meropogon forsteni
- White-bellied imperial pigeon, Ducula forsteni
- Minahasa hooded pitta, Pitta forsteni
