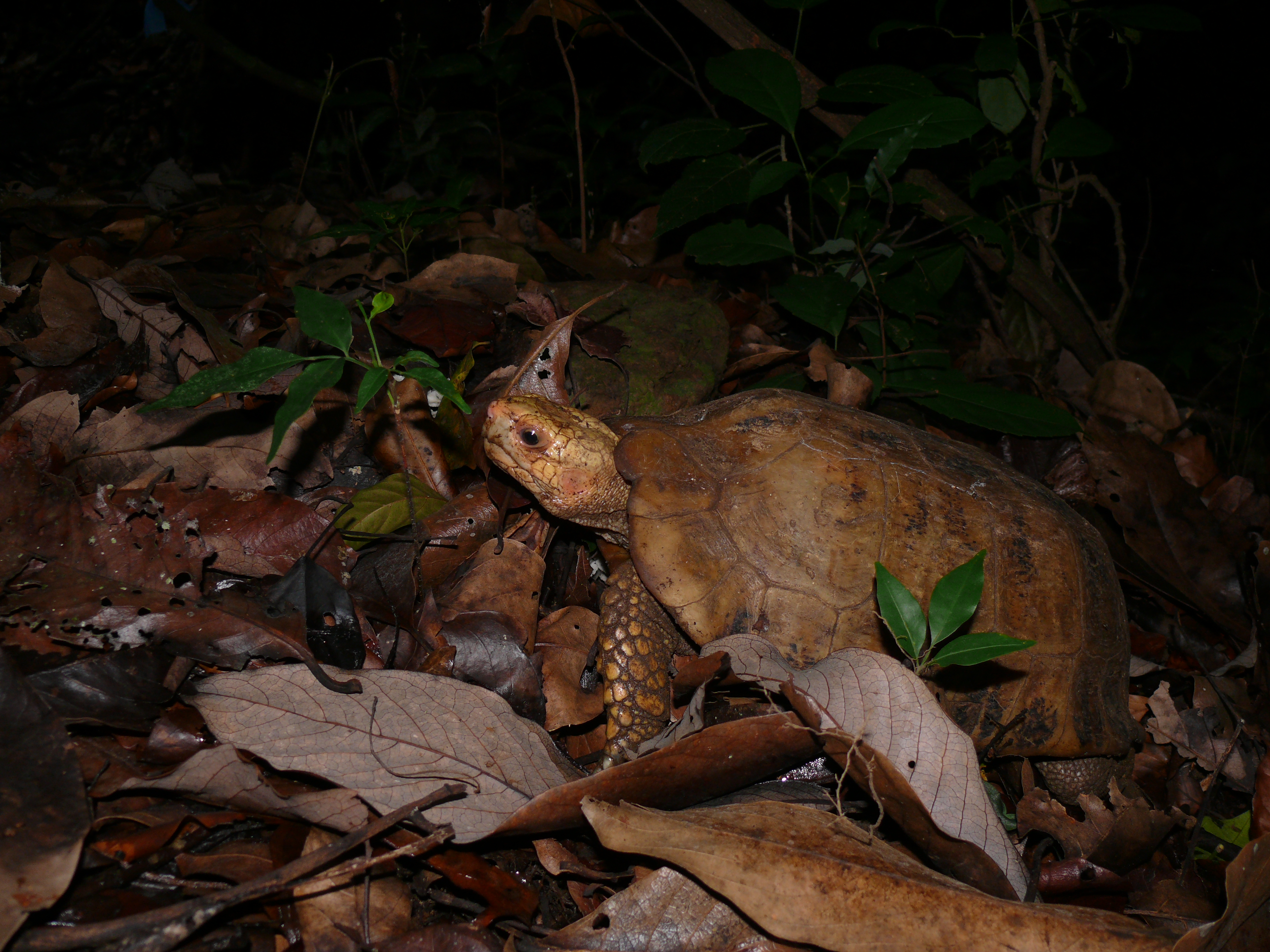
- Adult in the Anaimalai Hills

Conservation status
- Vulnerable (IUCN 2.3)

Scientific classification
- Domain: Eukaryota
- Kingdom: Animalia
- Phylum: Chordata
- Class: Reptilia
- Order: Testudines
- Suborder: Cryptodira
- Superfamily: Testudinoidea
- Family: Testudinidae
- Genus: Indotestudo
- Species: I. travancorica

Binomial name
- Indotestudo travancorica (Boulenger, 1907)

Synonyms
- Testudo travancorica Boulenger, 1907; Geochelone travancorica Auffenberg, 1964; Indotestudo travancorica Bour, 1980; Indotestudo elongata travancorica Obst, 1985; Geochelone elongata travancorica Gosławski & Hryniewicz, 1993; Indotestudo travancoica Orenstein, 2001 (ex errore); Testudo travencorica Rao, 2006 (ex errore)

= Travancore tortoise =

Species of tortoise

The Travancore tortoise (Indotestudo travancorica) is a large forest tortoise growing up to 330 millimetres (13 in) in length. The species was first described by George Albert Boulenger in 1907. It primarily feeds on grasses and herbs. It also feeds on molluscs, insects, animal carcass, fungi and fruits. It occurs in hill forests at 450–850 m elevation. Males combat by ramming their shell during their breeding season between November and March. It makes a shallow nest in the ground and lay 1 to 5 eggs. Hatchlings are 55–60 mm in size. The tortoise is hunted and it is threatened due to forest fires, habitat destruction and fragmentation.

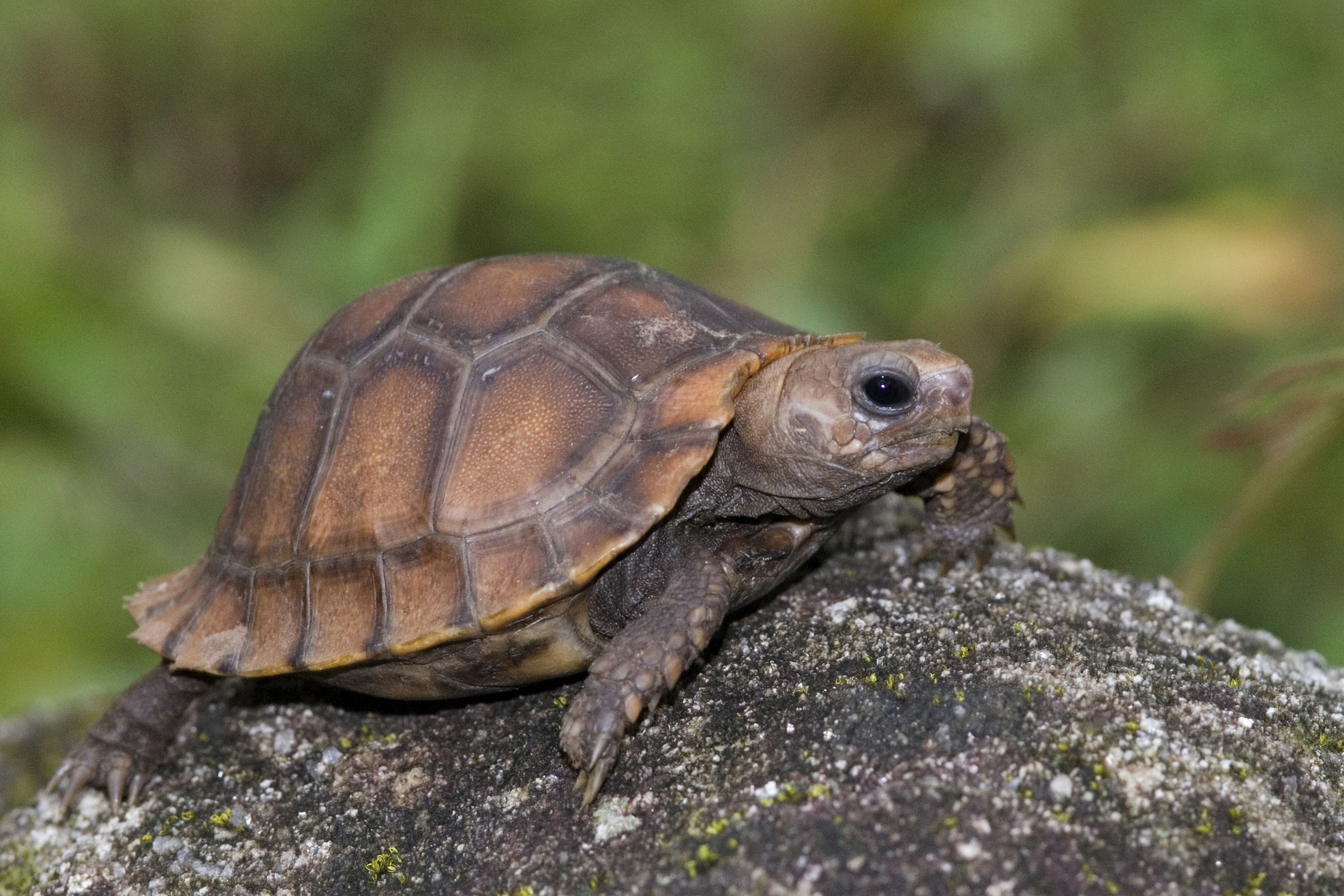
Juvenile

- Identification: a scute right behind the head is absent and the second scute along the vertebral column is located at the highest point of the shell.
- Status: IUCN Red list - vulnerable; Indian Wildlife (Protection) Act: Schedule IV.
- Distribution: restricted to the Western Ghats, in the Indian states of Kerala, Karnataka and Tamil Nadu.
- Vernacular names:
  - Tamil: periya amai, kal amai
  - Kadas: vengala amai
  - Kannada: betta aame, gudde aame, kadu aame
  - Malayalam: kattu aama
