= Banded pitta =

Group of birds

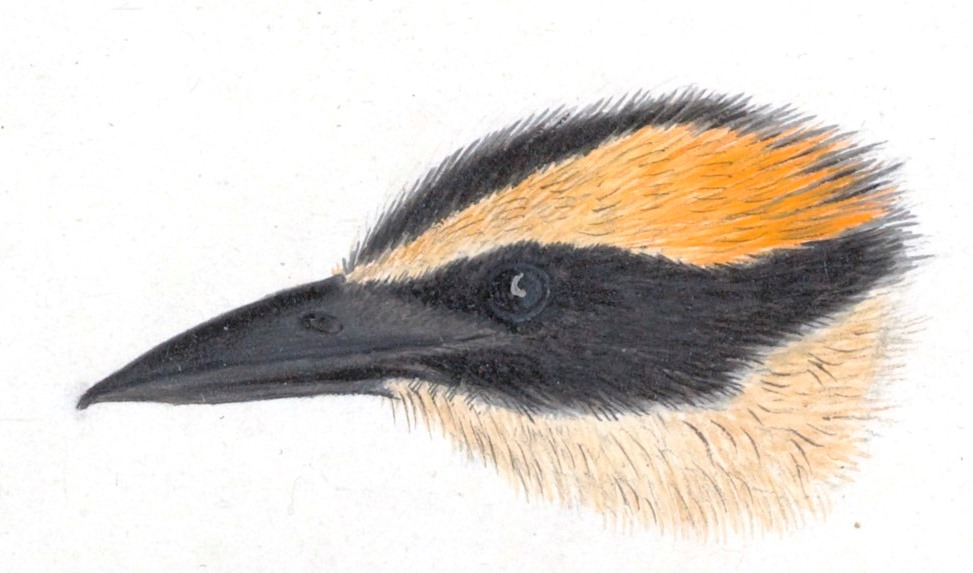
Head of a banded pitta

The banded pittas, Hydrornis spp., are a group of birds in the family Pittidae that were formerly lumped as a single species, Hydrornis guajana. They are found in forest in the Thai-Malay Peninsula and the Greater Sunda Islands.

== Description ==
The group includes four birds, which can be divided into three main groups: The species from Java and Bali has a yellow eyebrow, underparts that are densely barred in yellowish and blackish-blue and a narrow blue band on the upper chest; irena and ripleyi from the Thai-Malay Peninsula and Sumatra have a more orange eyebrow, a blue belly and a chest that is barred orange and dark bluish (more orange towards the sides, blue towards the center); and schwaneri from Borneo has a blue mid-belly and yellow flanks and chest densely barred with blackish. Females of all birds are significantly duller than the males. There are also vocal differences between these, and since 1993 they have been considered by several taxonomists to be better treated as three separate species:

- Bornean banded pitta (Hydrornis schwaneri)
- Javan banded pitta (Hydrornis guajana)
- Malayan banded pitta (Hydrornis irena)

== Gallery ==
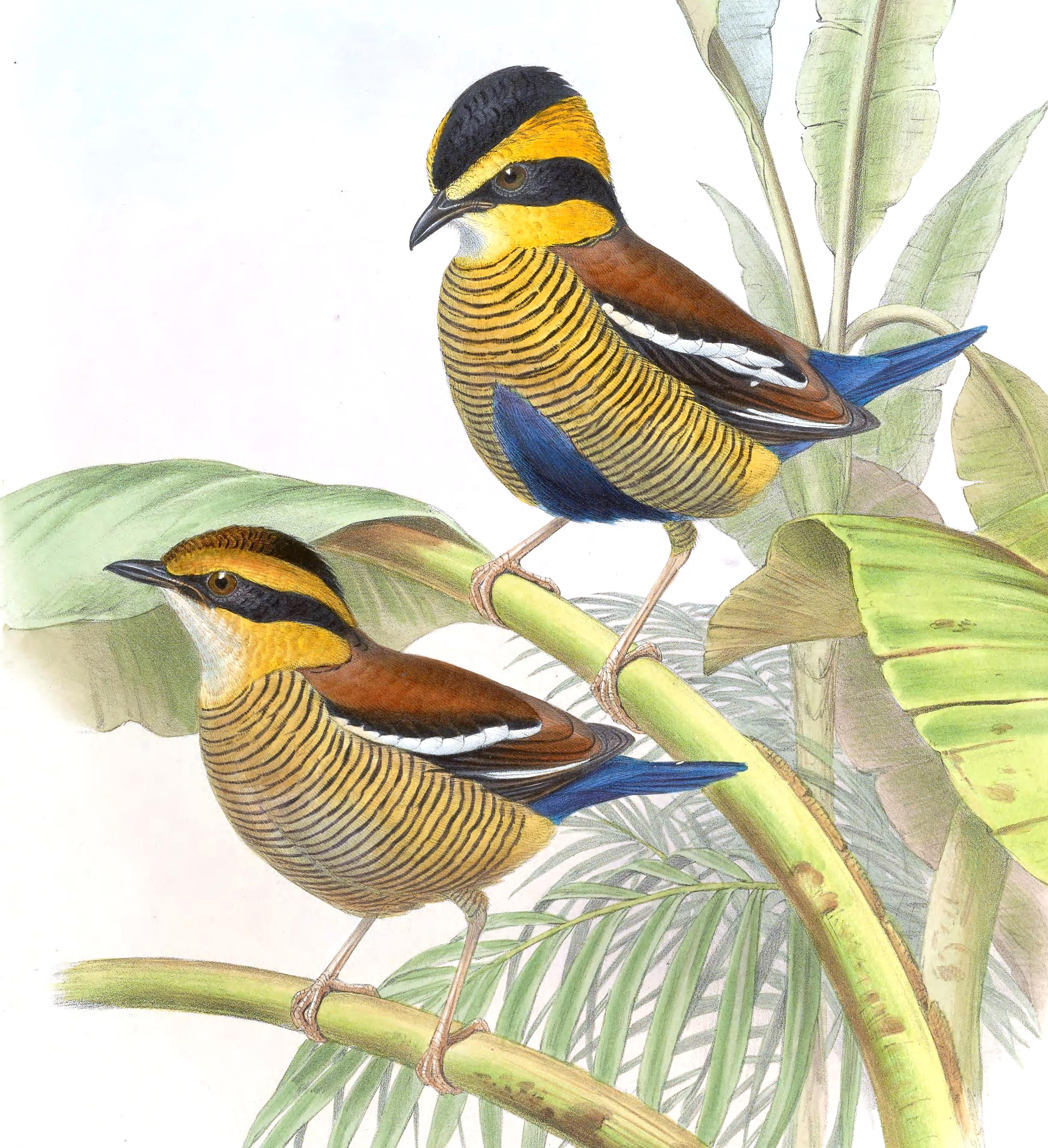
male and female
H. schwaneri

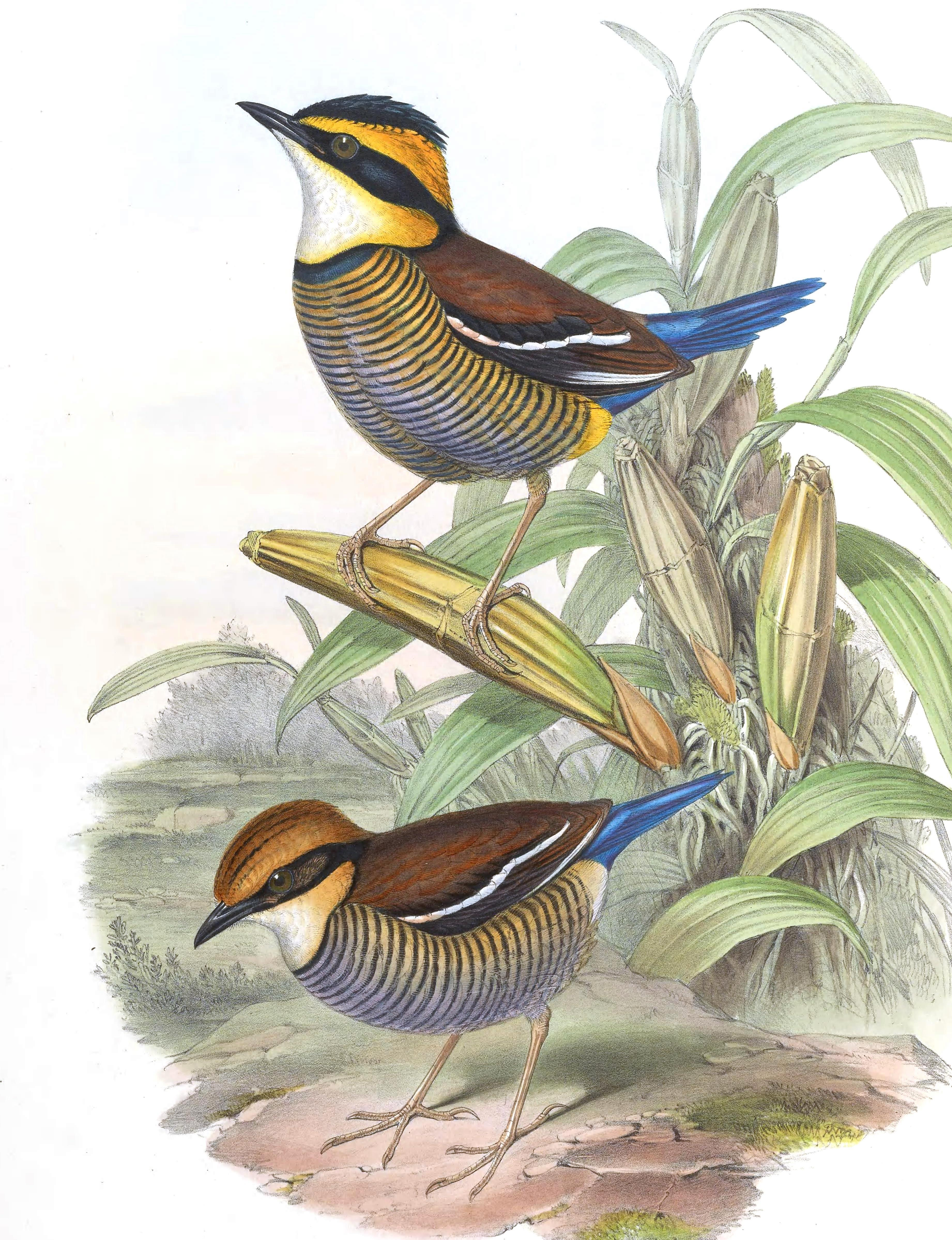
male and female
H. guajana

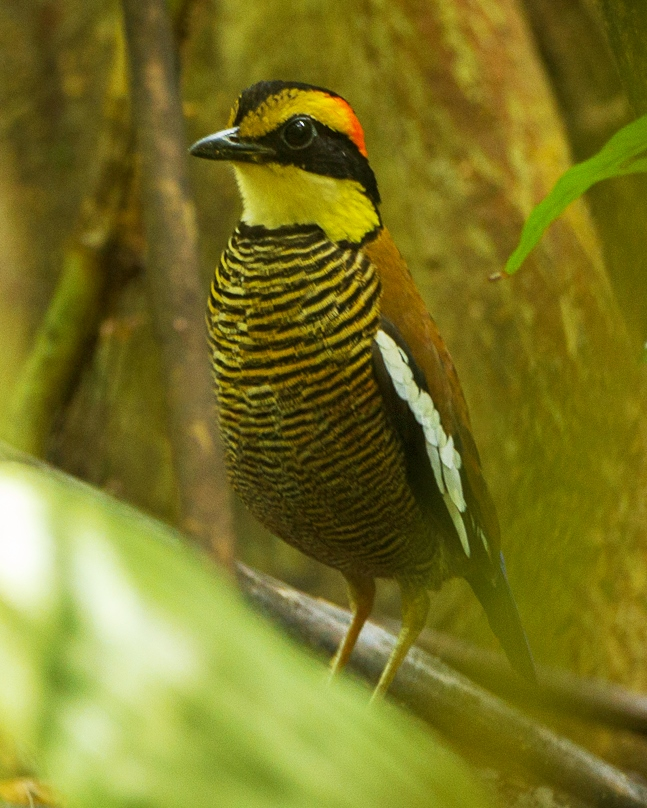
female
H. irena

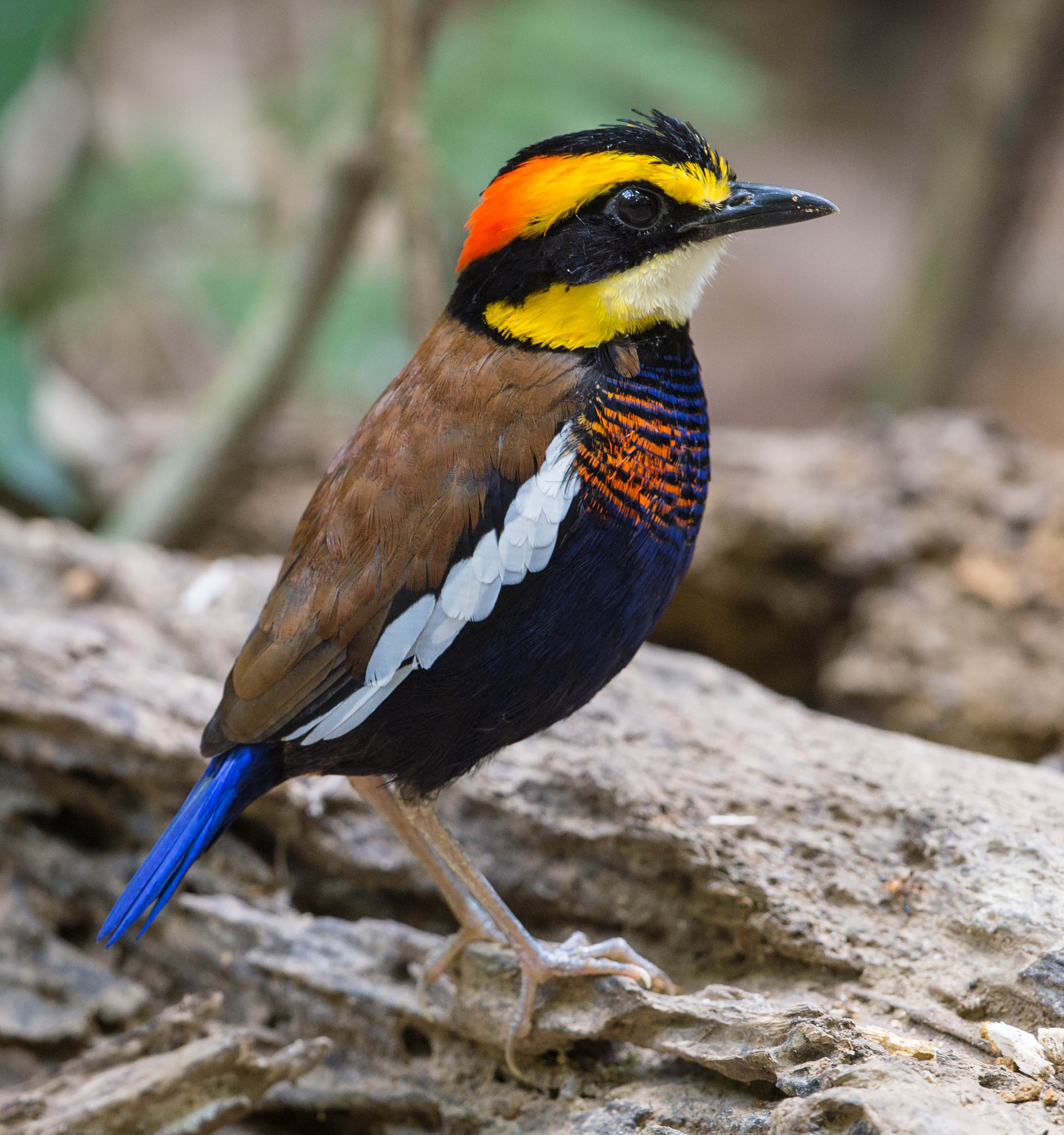
male
H. irena
