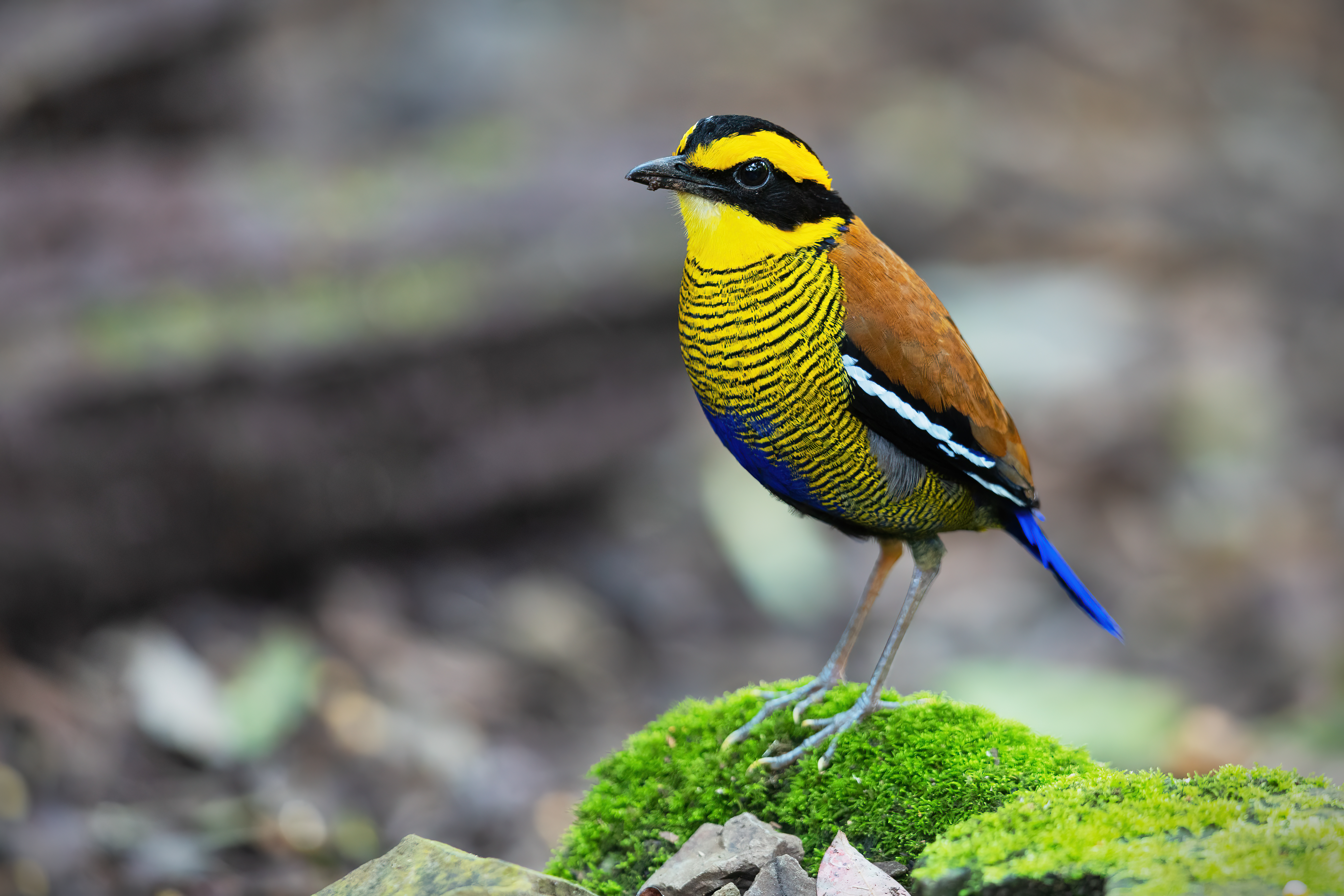
- male
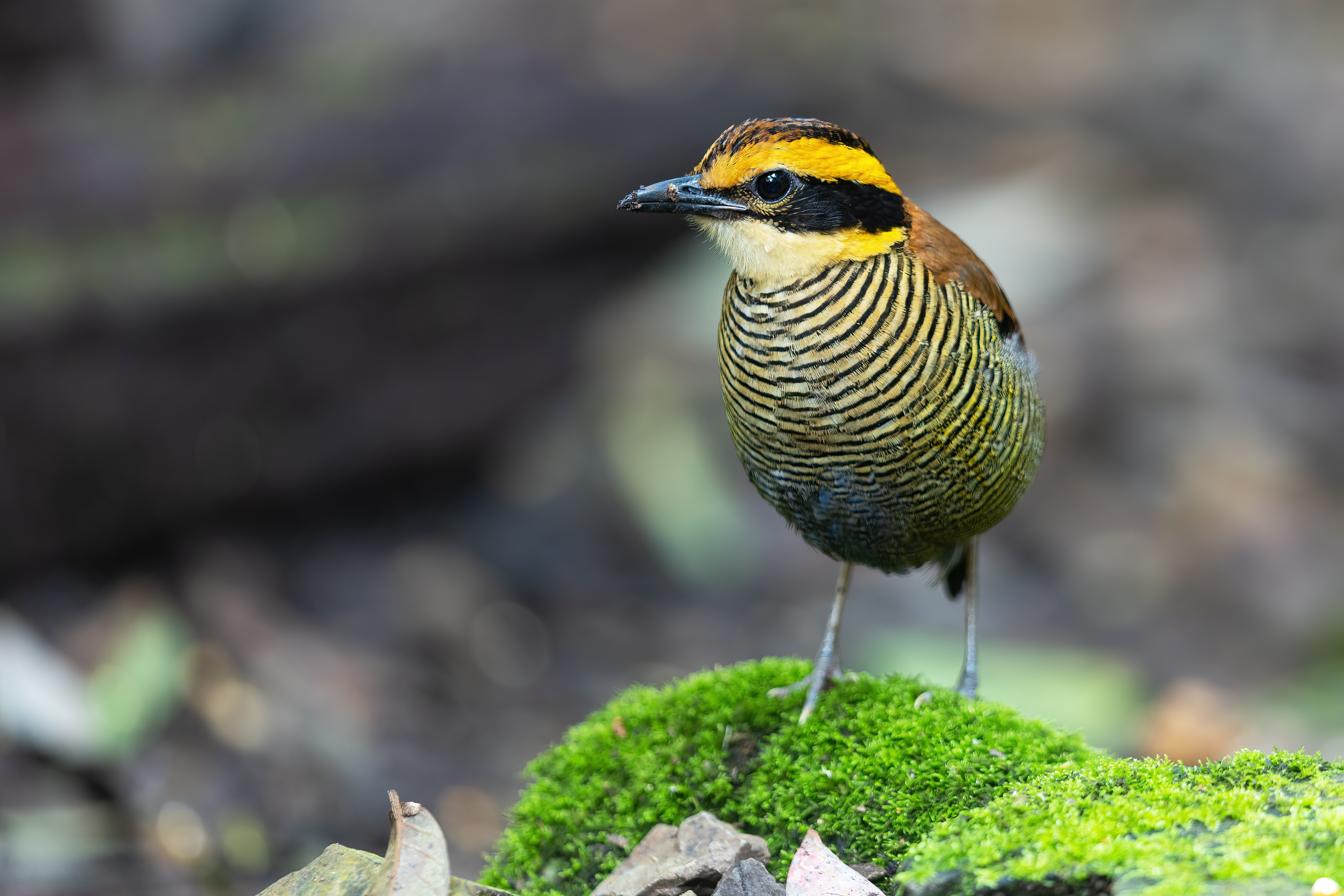
- female

Conservation status
- Least Concern (IUCN 3.1)

Scientific classification
- Kingdom: Animalia
- Phylum: Chordata
- Class: Aves
- Order: Passeriformes
- Family: Pittidae
- Genus: Hydrornis
- Species: H. schwaneri

Binomial name
- Hydrornis schwaneri (Bonaparte, 1850)

Synonyms
- Pitta schwaneri

= Bornean banded pitta =

Species of bird

The Bornean banded pitta (Hydrornis schwaneri) is a species of bird in the family Pittidae. It is found only in Borneo. It was formerly considered conspecific with the Javan and Malayan banded pittas. Together, they were referenced as the banded pitta.
