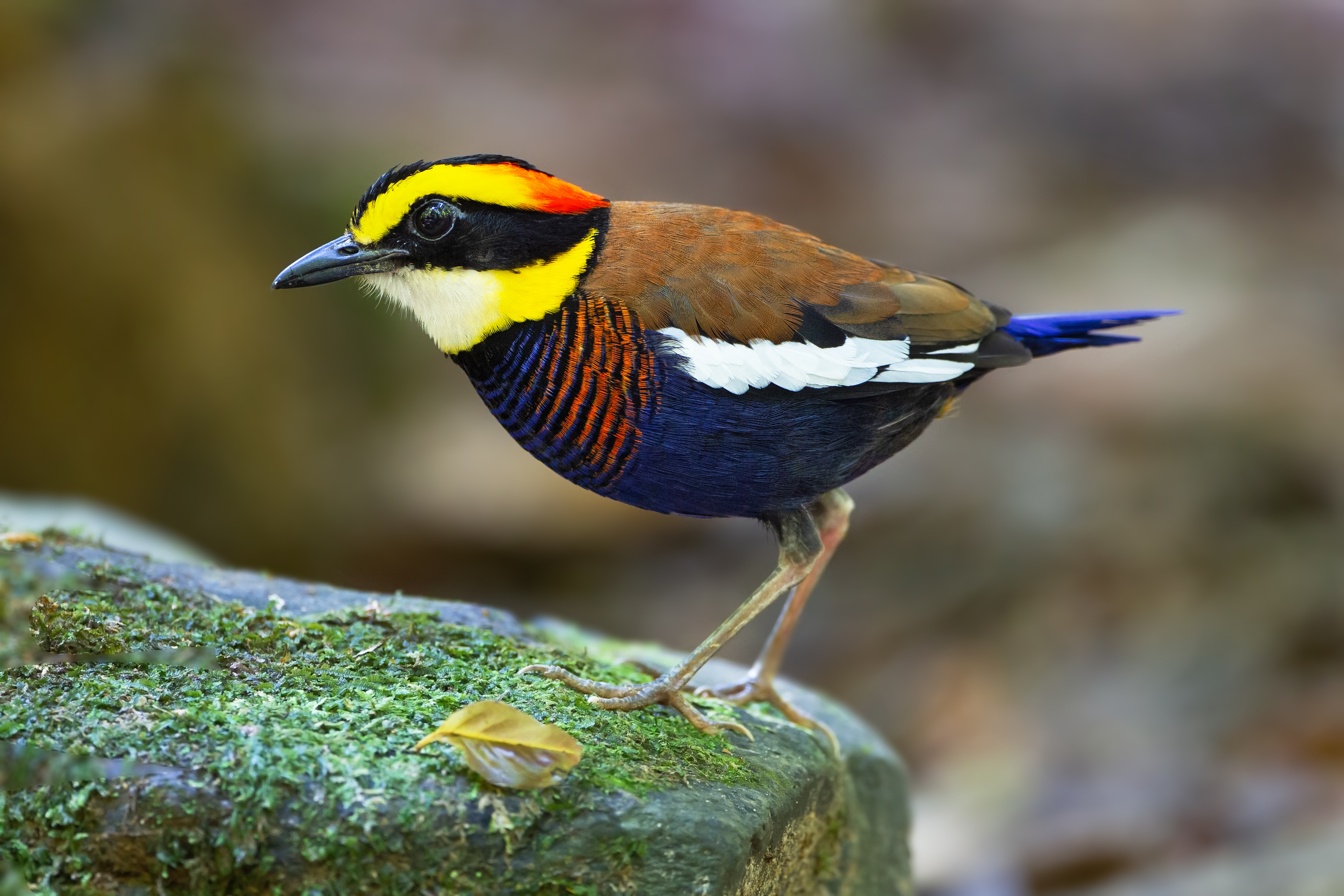
- In Si Phang Nga National Park, Thailand

Conservation status
- Near Threatened (IUCN 3.1)

Scientific classification
- Kingdom: Animalia
- Phylum: Chordata
- Class: Aves
- Order: Passeriformes
- Family: Pittidae
- Genus: Hydrornis
- Species: H. irena

Binomial name
- Hydrornis irena (Temminck, 1836)

Synonyms
- Pitta irena

= Malayan banded pitta =

Species of bird

The Malayan banded pitta (Hydrornis irena) is a species of bird in the family Pittidae. Other common names include the blue-tailed pitta, the Irene's pitta, the banded pitta and the Van den Bosch's pitta. It is found in Thailand, the Malay Peninsula and Sumatra. It was formerly considered conspecific with the Bornean and Javan banded pittas, together they were referred to as the banded pitta, but now they are considered to be separate species.

== Taxonomy ==
At one time the Malayan banded pitta, the Bornean banded pitta, and the Javan banded pitta were all considered to be variants of a single species. However, they were divided into three separate species by Rheindt and Eaton in 2010, based on analysis of morphological, behavioural, and vocal differences.

== Description ==
This colourful bird has a black head with a yellow/orange streak above the eye, an orange-red nape, a lemon-yellow throat, a chest barred with orange and dark blue (more orange towards the sides and more blue towards the centre), and a blue belly. The back is brown and the tail is blue.

== Distribution and habitat ==
The Malayan banded pitta is native to tropical south-eastern Asia where its range includes Malaysia, Thailand and Sumatra. It typically inhabits primary lowland evergreen forests, including swamp forests, but can occur at altitudes of up to 1,500 m (5,000 ft). It also occurs in secondary forest, but may not persist well in this environment. Its diet is mainly insects and fruits.

== Status ==
The Malayan banded pitta is common in some places but scarce in others where its forest habitat is degraded by logging and conversion into agricultural land. With much of the primary forest lost in Thailand and Peninsular Malaysia, it is uncommon in these locations. It is also targeted for the illegal cage-bird trade and populations are declining; for these reasons, the International Union for Conservation of Nature has assessed its conservation status as being "near threatened".
