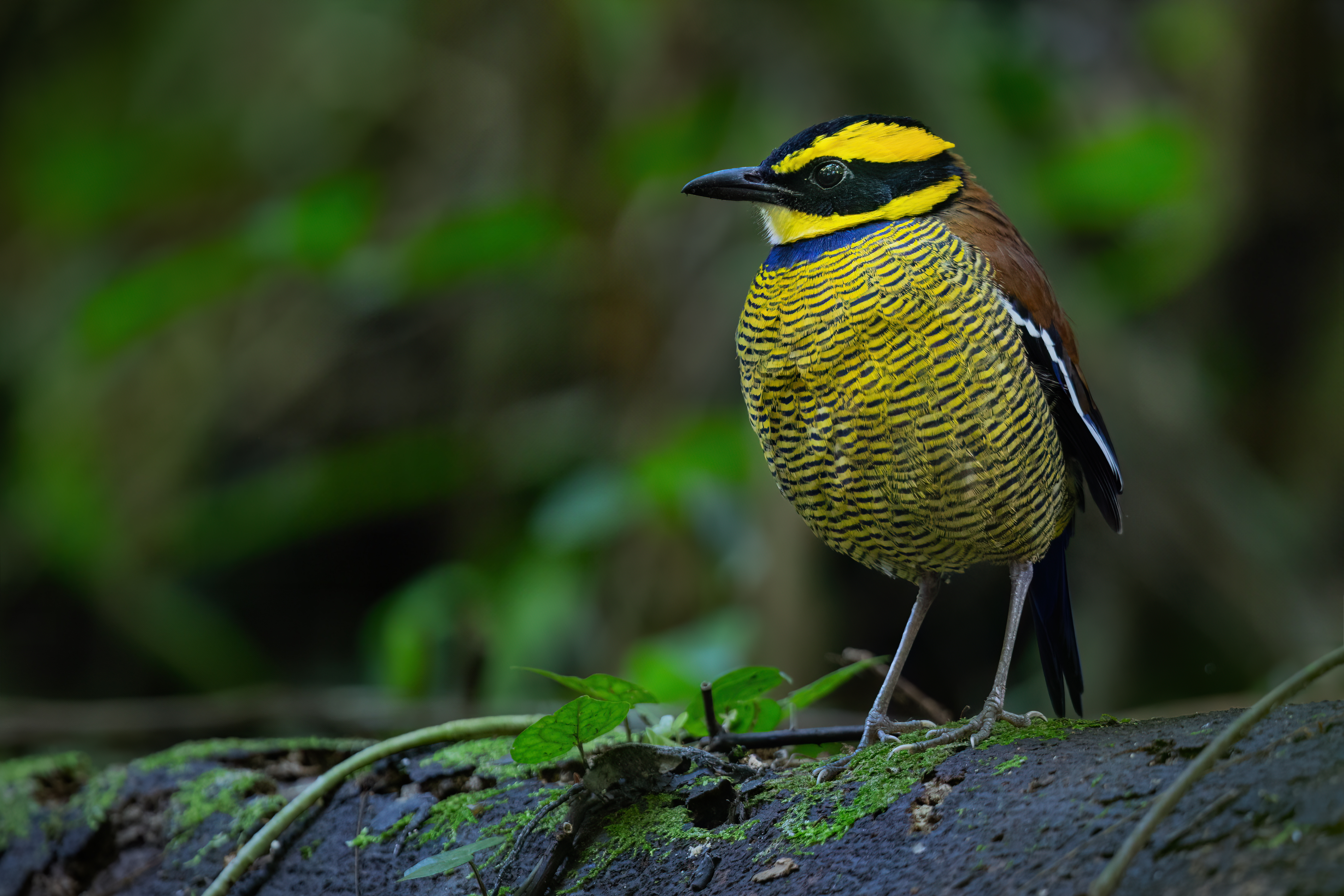
- Male in East Java, Indonesia
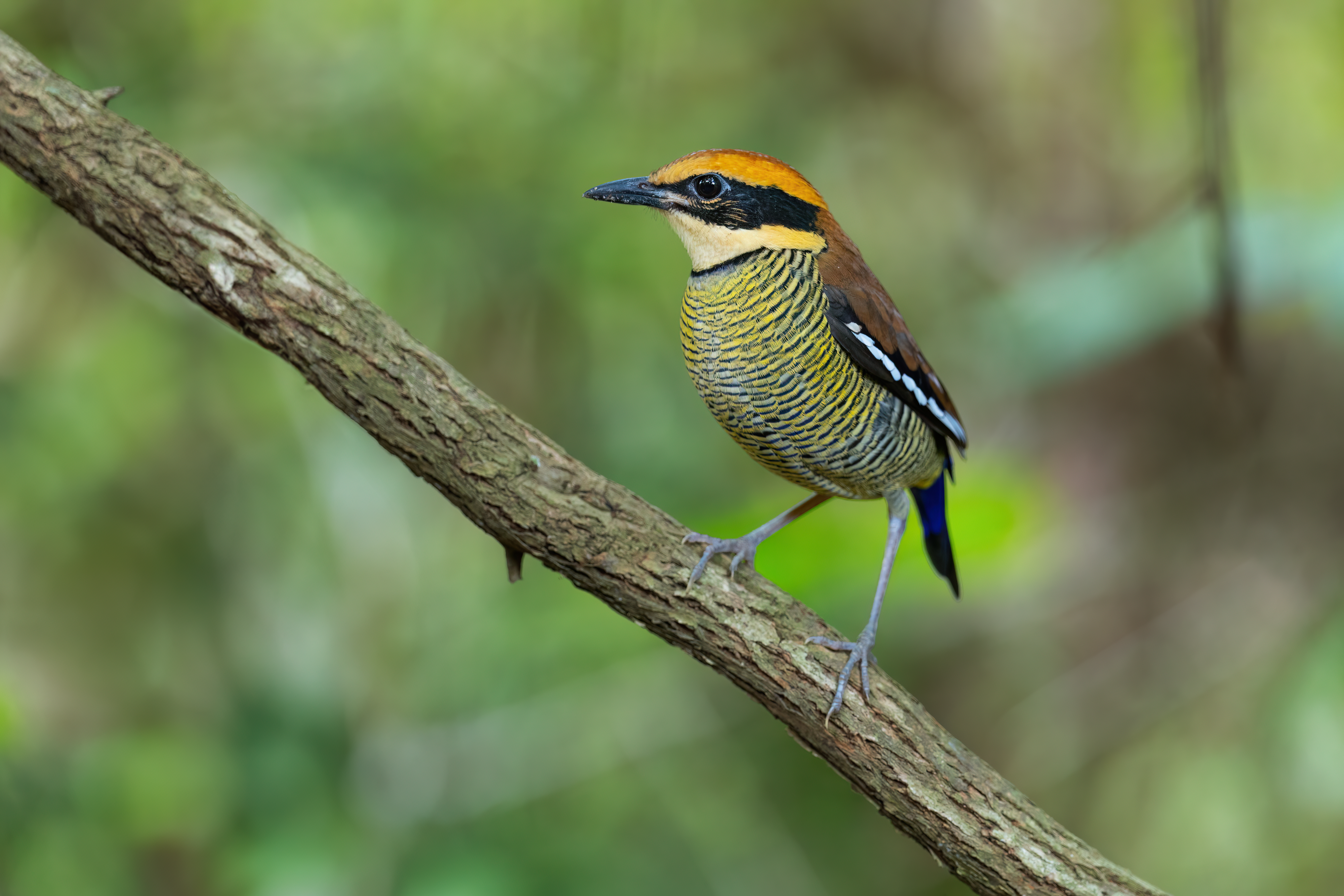
- Female in Bali, Indonesia

Conservation status
- Least Concern (IUCN 3.1)
- CITES Appendix II

Scientific classification
- Kingdom: Animalia
- Phylum: Chordata
- Class: Aves
- Order: Passeriformes
- Family: Pittidae
- Genus: Hydrornis
- Species: H. guajanus

Binomial name
- Hydrornis guajanus (Statius Müller, 1776)

Synonyms
- Pitta guajana

= Javan banded pitta =

Species of bird

The Javan banded pitta (Hydrornis guajanus) is a species of bird in the family Pittidae. It is found in Java and Bali. It was formerly considered conspecific with the Bornean and Malayan banded pittas. Together, they were referenced as the banded pitta.
